= 2017–18 Boston Bruins season =

NHL team season

2017–18 Boston Bruins
- Division: 2nd Atlantic
- Conference: 2nd Eastern
- 2017–18 record: 50–20–12
- Home record: 28–8–5
- Road record: 22–12–7
- Goals for: 270
- Goals against: 214

Team information
- General manager: Don Sweeney
- Coach: Bruce Cassidy
- Captain: Zdeno Chara
- Alternate captains: Patrice Bergeron; David Krejci
- Arena: TD Garden
- Average attendance: 17,565
- Minor league affiliates: Providence Bruins (AHL); Atlanta Gladiators (ECHL)

Team leaders
- Goals: David Pastrnak (35)
- Assists: Brad Marchand (51)
- Points: Brad Marchand (85)
- Penalty minutes: Kevan Miller (70)
- Plus/minus: Brad Marchand (+25)
- Wins: Tuukka Rask (34)
- Goals against average: Tuukka Rask (2.36)

The 2017–18 Boston Bruins season was the 94th season for the National Hockey League (NHL) franchise that was established on November 1, 1924.

== Standings ==
Atlantic Division
Pos	Team	GP	W	L	OTL	ROW	GF	GA	GD	Pts
1	z – Tampa Bay Lightning	82	54	23	5	48	296	236	+60	113
2	x – Boston Bruins	82	50	20	12	47	270	214	+56	112
3	x – Toronto Maple Leafs	82	49	26	7	42	277	232	+45	105
4	Florida Panthers	82	44	30	8	41	248	246	+2	96
5	Detroit Red Wings	82	30	39	13	25	217	255	−38	73
6	Montreal Canadiens	82	29	40	13	27	209	264	−55	71
7	Ottawa Senators	82	28	43	11	26	221	291	−70	67
8	Buffalo Sabres	82	25	45	12	24	199	280	−81	62

Source: National Hockey League
x – Clinched playoff spot; z – Clinched conference

== Schedule and results ==
=== Preseason ===
The Bruins announced their preseason schedule on June 1, 2017.

2017 preseason game log: 4–3–0 (Home: 4–0–0; Road: 0–3–0)
#	Date	Visitor	Score	Home	OT	Decision	Attendance	Record	Recap
1^{[a]}	September 18	Montreal	2–3	Boston		—	—	1–0–0	Recap
2	September 19	Detroit	2–4	Boston		Khudobin	16,309	2–0–0	Recap
3	September 21	Philadelphia	1–2	Boston	OT	Rask	16,781	3–0–0	Recap
4	September 23	Boston	1–5	Detroit		McIntyre	17,314	3–1–0	Recap
5	September 25	Chicago	2–4	Boston		Subban	16,374	4–1–0	Recap
6	September 28	Boston	1–5	Philadelphia		Rask	18,572	4–2–0	Recap
7	September 30	Boston	0–1	Chicago		Khudobin	20,703	4–3–0	Recap
Notes:^{a} Game was played at Videotron Centre in Quebec City, Quebec.

=== Regular season ===
The Bruins' regular season schedule was made public on June 22, 2017.

2017–18 game log

October: 4–3–3 (Home: 3–1–2; Road: 1–2–1)
#	Date	Visitor	Score	Home	OT	Decision	Attendance	Record	Pts	Recap
1	October 5	Nashville	3–4	Boston		Rask	17,565	1–0–0	2	Recap
2	October 9	Colorado	4–0	Boston		Rask	17,565	1–1–0	2	Recap
3	October 11	Boston	3–6	Colorado		Rask	18,011	1–2–0	2	Recap
4	October 14	Boston	6–2	Arizona		Khudobin	14,810	2–2–0	4	recap
5	October 15	Boston	1–3	Vegas		Rask	17,562	2–3–0	4	Recap
6	October 19	Vancouver	3–6	Boston		Khudobin	17,565	3–3–0	6	Recap
7	October 21	Buffalo	5–4	Boston	OT	Khudobin	17,565	3–3–1	7	Recap
8	October 26	San Jose	1–2	Boston		Khudobin	17,565	4–3–1	9	Recap
9	October 28	Los Angeles	2–1	Boston	OT	Rask	17,565	4–3–2	10	Recap
10	October 30	Boston	3–4	Columbus	SO	Rask	13,396	4–3–3	11	Recap

November: 7–5–1 (Home: 4–3–0; Road: 3–2–1)
#	Date	Visitor	Score	Home	OT	Decision	Attendance	Record	Pts	Recap
11	November 2	Vegas	1–2	Boston		Rask	17,565	5–3–3	13	Recap
12	November 4	Washington	3–2	Boston		Rask	17,565	5–4–3	13	Recap
13	November 6	Minnesota	3–5	Boston		Rask	17,565	6–4–3	15	Recap
14	November 8	Boston	2–4	NY Rangers		Rask	18,006	6–5–3	15	Recap
15	November 10	Boston	2–3	Toronto	OT	Khudobin	19,381	6–5–4	16	Recap
16	November 11	Toronto	4–1	Boston		Rask	17,565	6–6–4	16	Recap
17	November 15	Boston	2–4	Anaheim		Rask	15,089	6–7–4	16	Recap
18	November 16	Boston	2–1	Los Angeles		Khudobin	18,230	7–7–4	18	Recap
19	November 18	Boston	3–1	San Jose		Khudobin	17,442	8–7–4	20	Recap
20	November 22	Boston	3–2	New Jersey	SO	Khudobin	16,514	9–7–4	22	Recap
21	November 24	Pittsburgh	3–4	Boston		Khudobin	17,565	10–7–4	24	Recap
22	November 26	Edmonton	4–2	Boston		Rask	17,565	10–8–4	24	Recap
23	November 29	Tampa Bay	2–3	Boston		Rask	17,565	11–8–4	26	Recap

December: 10–2–2 (Home: 6–1–1; Road: 4–1–1)
#	Date	Visitor	Score	Home	OT	Decision	Attendance	Record	Pts	Recap
24	December 2	Boston	3–0	Philadelphia		Rask	19,274	12–8–4	28	Recap
25	December 4	Boston	3–5	Nashville		Khudobin	17,113	12–9–4	28	Recap
26	December 7	Arizona	1–6	Boston		Rask	17,565	13–9–4	30	Recap
27	December 9	NY Islanders	1–3	Boston		Rask	17,565	14–9–4	32	Recap
28	December 13	Boston	3–2	Detroit	OT	Rask	19,515	15–9–4	34	Recap
29	December 14	Washington	5–3	Boston		Khudobin	17,565	15–10–4	34	Recap
30	December 16	NY Rangers	3–2	Boston	OT	Rask	17,565	15–10–5	35	Recap
31	December 18	Columbus	2–7	Boston		Rask	17,565	16–10–5	37	Recap
32	December 19	Boston	3–0	Buffalo		Khudobin	17,811	17–10–5	39	Recap
33	December 21	Winnipeg	1–2	Boston	SO	Rask	17,565	18–10–5	41	Recap
34	December 23	Detroit	1–3	Boston		Rask	17,565	19–10–5	43	Recap
35	December 27	Ottawa	1–5	Boston		Rask	17,565	20–10–5	45	Recap
36	December 28	Boston	3–4	Washington	SO	Khudobin	18,506	20–10–6	46	Recap
37	December 30	Boston	5–0	Ottawa		Rask	17,579	21–10–6	48	Recap

January: 8–1–2 (Home: 3–1–1; Road: 5–0–1)
#	Date	Visitor	Score	Home	OT	Decision	Attendance	Record	Pts	Recap
38	January 2	Boston	5–1	NY Islanders		Rask	11,878	22–10–6	50	Recap
—	January 4	Florida	—	Boston	Postponed due to the effects of the January 2018 nor'easter, rescheduled to April 8
39	January 6	Carolina	1–7	Boston		Khudobin	17,565	23–10–6	52	Recap
40	January 7	Boston	5–6	Pittsburgh	OT	Rask	18,553	23–10–7	53	Recap
41	January 13	Boston	4–3	Montreal	SO	Rask	21,302	24–10–7	55	Recap
42	January 15	Dallas	3–2	Boston	OT	Khudobin	17,565	24–10–8	56	Recap
43	January 17	Montreal	1–4	Boston		Rask	17,565	25–10–8	58	Recap
44	January 18	Boston	5–2	NY Islanders		Khudobin	11,803	26–10–8	60	Recap
45	January 20	Boston	4–1	Montreal		Rask	21,302	27–10–8	62	Recap
46	January 23	New Jersey	2–3	Boston		Rask	17,565	28–10–8	64	Recap
47	January 25	Boston	3–2	Ottawa		Rask	15,232	29–10–8	66	Recap
48	January 30	Anaheim	3–1	Boston		Khudobin	17,565	29–11–8	66	Recap

February: 9–4–0 (Home: 4–1–0; Road: 5–3–0)
#	Date	Visitor	Score	Home	OT	Decision	Attendance	Record	Pts	Recap
49	February 1	St. Louis	1–3	Boston		Rask	17,565	30–11–8	68	Recap
50	February 3	Toronto	1–4	Boston		Rask	17,565	31–11–8	70	Recap
51	February 6	Boston	3–2	Detroit		Rask	19,515	32–11–8	72	Recap
52	February 7	Boston	6–1	NY Rangers		Khudobin	18,006	33–11–8	74	Recap
53	February 10	Buffalo	4–2	Boston		Rask	17,565	33–12–8	74	Recap
54	February 11	Boston	5–3	New Jersey		Khudobin	16,514	34–12–8	76	Recap
55	February 13	Calgary	2–5	Boston		Rask	17,565	35–12–8	78	Recap
56	February 17	Boston	1–6	Vancouver		Rask	18,865	35–13–8	78	Recap
57	February 19	Boston	2–1	Calgary	OT	Rask	19,289	36–13–8	80	Recap
58	February 20	Boston	3–2	Edmonton		Khudobin	18,347	37–13–8	82	Recap
59	February 24	Boston	3–4	Toronto		Rask	19,370	37–14–8	82	Recap
60	February 25	Boston	1–4	Buffalo		Khudobin	18,522	37–15–8	82	Recap
61	February 27	Carolina	3–4	Boston	OT	Rask	17,565	38–15–8	84	Recap

March: 11–2–3 (Home: 7–0–1; Road: 4–2–2)
#	Date	Visitor	Score	Home	OT	Decision	Attendance	Record	Pts	Recap
62	March 1	Pittsburgh	4–8	Boston		Rask	17,565	39–15–8	86	Recap
63	March 3	Montreal	1–2	Boston	OT	Khudobin	17,565	40–15–8	88	Recap
64	March 6	Detroit	5–6	Boston	OT	Khudobin	17,565	41–15–8	90	Recap
65	March 8	Philadelphia	2–3	Boston		Rask	17,565	42–15–8	92	Recap
66	March 10	Chicago	4–7	Boston		Rask	17,565	43–15–8	94	Recap
67	March 11	Boston	1–3	Chicago		Khudobin	21,819	43–16–8	94	Recap
68	March 13	Boston	6–4	Carolina		Rask	13,081	44–16–8	96	Recap
69	March 15	Boston	0–3	Florida		Khudobin	16,067	44–17–8	96	Recap
70	March 17	Boston	3–0	Tampa Bay		Rask	19,092	45–17–8	98	Recap
71	March 19	Columbus	5–4	Boston	OT	Rask	17,565	45–17–9	99	Recap
72	March 21	Boston	1–2	St. Louis	OT	Khudobin	18,423	45–17–10	100	Recap
73	March 23	Boston	3–2	Dallas		Rask	18,532	46–17–10	102	Recap
74	March 25	Boston	2–1	Minnesota	OT	Rask	19,183	47–17–10	104	Recap
75	March 27	Boston	4–5	Winnipeg	SO	Khudobin	15,321	47–17–11	105	Recap
76	March 29	Tampa Bay	2–4	Boston		Rask	17,565	48–17–11	107	Recap
77	March 31	Florida	1–5	Boston		Rask	17,565	49–17–11	109	Recap

April: 1–3–1 (Home: 1–1–0; Road: 0–2–1)
#	Date	Visitor	Score	Home	OT	Decision	Attendance	Record	Pts	Recap
78	April 1	Boston	3–4	Philadelphia	OT	Khudobin	19,904	49–17–12	110	Recap
79	April 3	Boston	0–4	Tampa Bay		Rask	19,092	49–18–12	110	Recap
80	April 5	Boston	2–3	Florida		Rask	14,860	49–19–12	110	Recap
81	April 7	Ottawa	2–5	Boston		Khudobin	17,565	50–19–12	112	Recap
82	April 8	Florida	4–2	Boston		Rask	17,565	50–20–12	112	Recap

Legend: Win (2 points) Loss (0 points) Overtime/shootout loss (1 point)

=== Playoffs ===
2018 Stanley Cup playoffs

Eastern Conference First Round vs. (A3) Toronto Maple Leafs: Boston won 4–3
#	Date	Visitor	Score	Home	OT	Decision	Attendance	Series	Recap
1	April 12	Toronto	1–5	Boston		Rask	17,565	1–0	Recap
2	April 14	Toronto	3–7	Boston		Rask	17,565	2–0	Recap
3	April 16	Boston	2–4	Toronto		Rask	19,663	2–1	Recap
4	April 19	Boston	3–1	Toronto		Rask	19,689	3–1	Recap
5	April 21	Toronto	4–3	Boston		Rask	17,565	3–2	Recap
6	April 23	Boston	1–3	Toronto		Rask	19,604	3–3	Recap
7	April 25	Toronto	4–7	Boston		Rask	17,565	4–3	Recap

Eastern Conference Second Round vs. (A1) Tampa Bay Lightning: Tampa Bay won 4–1
#	Date	Visitor	Score	Home	OT	Decision	Attendance	Series	Recap
1	April 28	Boston	6–2	Tampa Bay		Rask	19,092	1–0	Recap
2	April 30	Boston	2–4	Tampa Bay		Rask	19,092	1–1	Recap
3	May 2	Tampa Bay	4–1	Boston		Rask	17,565	1–2	Recap
4	May 4	Tampa Bay	4–3	Boston	OT	Rask	17,565	1–3	Recap
5	May 6	Boston	1–3	Tampa Bay		Rask	19,092	1–4	Recap

Legend: Win Loss

== Player statistics ==
Final Stats

=== Skaters ===
Regular season
Player	GP	G	A	Pts	+/−	PIM
Brad Marchand	68	34	51	85	25	63
David Pastrnak	82	35	45	80	10	37
Patrice Bergeron	64	30	33	63	21	26
Torey Krug	76	14	45	59	0	36
Danton Heinen	77	16	31	47	10	16
David Krejci	64	17	27	44	10	18
Jake DeBrusk	70	16	27	43	13	19
Riley Nash	76	15	26	41	16	18
David Backes	57	14	19	33	2	53
Charlie McAvoy	63	7	25	32	20	53
Ryan Spooner^{‡}	39	9	16	25	10	2
Zdeno Chara	73	7	17	24	22	60
Tim Schaller	82	12	10	22	−5	42
Kevan Miller	68	1	15	16	16	70
Matt Grzelcyk	61	3	12	15	21	22
Sean Kuraly	75	6	8	14	−5	40
Anders Bjork	30	4	8	12	2	6
Noel Acciari	60	10	1	11	−6	9
Ryan Donato	12	5	4	9	2	2
Brian Gionta	20	2	5	7	−1	2
Rick Nash^{†}	11	3	3	6	−4	4
Brandon Carlo	76	0	6	6	10	45
Tommy Wingels^{†}	18	2	3	5	−1	2
Nick Holden^{†}	18	1	4	5	−2	0
Adam McQuaid	38	1	3	4	−1	62
Austin Czarnik	10	0	4	4	−1	0
Jordan Szwarz	12	0	3	3	−4	2
Frank Vatrano^{‡}	25	2	0	2	−3	22
Peter Cehlarik	6	1	1	2	2	2
Kenny Agostino	5	0	1	1	−1	4
Paul Postma	14	0	1	1	−2	2
Anton Blidh	1	0	0	0	0	0
Colby Cave	3	0	0	0	0	2
Matt Beleskey^{‡}	14	0	0	0	−8	17
Rob O'Gara^{‡}	8	0	0	0	−5	0

Playoffs
Player	GP	G	A	Pts	+/−	PIM
David Pastrnak	12	6	14	20	2	8
Brad Marchand	12	4	13	17	4	16
Patrice Bergeron	11	6	10	16	6	2
Torey Krug	11	3	9	12	−5	8
David Krejci	12	3	7	10	−4	6
Jake DeBrusk	12	6	2	8	−1	8
Rick Nash	12	3	2	5	−7	10
Charlie McAvoy	12	1	4	5	2	6
Sean Kuraly	12	2	2	4	5	2
Kevan Miller	12	1	3	4	2	4
David Backes	12	2	1	3	−6	19
Zdeno Chara	12	1	2	3	7	4
Noel Acciari	12	1	1	2	0	2
Adam McQuaid	12	1	1	2	0	0
Tim Schaller	11	0	2	2	3	2
Danton Heinen	9	1	0	1	−1	2
Nick Holden	2	0	1	1	1	0
Matt Grzelcyk	11	0	1	1	−2	4
Riley Nash	9	0	1	1	−3	4
Tommy Wingels	4	0	0	0	0	0
Brian Gionta	1	0	0	0	−1	0
Ryan Donato	3	0	0	0	−3	0

=== Goaltenders ===
Regular season
Player	GP	GS	TOI	W	L	OT	GA	GAA	SA	SV%	SO	G	A	PIM
Tuukka Rask	54	53	3,173:05	34	14	5	125	2.36	1,513	.917	3	0	2	4
Anton Khudobin	31	29	1,780:43	16	6	7	76	2.56	876	.913	1	0	2	2

Playoffs
Player	GP	GS	MIN	W	L	GA	GAA	SA	SV%	SO	G	A	PIM
Tuukka Rask	12	12	686:50	5	7	33	2.88	339	.903	0	0	0	0
Anton Khudobin	1	0	26:37	0	0	0	0.00	8	1.000	0	0	0	0

^{†}Denotes player spent time with another team before joining the Bruins. Statistics reflect time with the Bruins only.
^{‡}Denotes player was traded mid-season. Statistics reflect time with the Bruins only.
Bold/italics denotes franchise record.

== Awards and honors ==
=== Milestones ===
Regular season
Player	Milestone	Reached
Jake DeBrusk	1st career NHL game 1st career NHL goal 1st career NHL point	October 5, 2017
Charlie McAvoy	1st career NHL game 1st career NHL goal 1st career NHL assist 1st career NHL point	October 5, 2017
Anders Bjork	1st career NHL game 1st career NHL assist 1st career NHL point	October 5, 2017
Danton Heinen	1st career NHL game 1st career NHL assist 1st career NHL point	October 10, 2017
Anders Bjork	1st career NHL goal	October 14, 2017
Danton Heinen	1st career NHL goal	October 26, 2017
Matt Grzelcyk	1st career NHL assist 1st career NHL point	November 22, 2017
Matt Grzelcyk	1st career NHL goal	November 24, 2017
Zdeno Chara	1,400th career NHL game	February 3, 2018
Ryan Spooner	100th career NHL assist	February 11, 2018
Ryan Donato	1st career NHL game 1st career NHL goal 1st career NHL assist 1st career NHL point	March 19, 2018

=== Records ===
Regular season
Player	Record	Reached

== Transactions ==
The Bruins have been involved in the following transactions during the 2017–18 season.

=== Trades ===
Date	Details		Ref
February 20, 2018	To New York Rangers Rob O'Gara; 3rd-round pick in 2018	To Boston Bruins Nick Holden
February 22, 2018	To Florida Panthers Frank Vatrano	To Boston Bruins 3rd-round pick in 2018
February 25, 2018	To New York Rangers Matt Beleskey^{[Note 1]} Ryan Lindgren; Ryan Spooner; 1st-round pick in 2018; 7th-round pick in 2019	To Boston Bruins Rick Nash^{[Note 2]}
February 26, 2018	To Chicago Blackhawks Conditional 5th-round pick in 2019	To Boston Bruins Tommy Wingels

Notes:

1. ^{Note 1} Boston to retain 50% of salary as part of trade.
2. ^{Note 2} New York to retain 50% of salary as part of trade.

=== Free agents acquired ===
Date	Player	Former team	Contract terms (in U.S. dollars)	Ref
July 1, 2017	Kenny Agostino	St. Louis Blues	1-year, $875,000	
July 1, 2017	Paul Postma	Winnipeg Jets	1-year, $725,000	
July 1, 2017	Jordan Szwarz	Providence Bruins	1-year, $650,000	
October 3, 2017	Kyle Keyser	Oshawa Generals	3-year, $2.15 million entry-level	
February 25, 2018	Brian Gionta	Rochester Americans	1-year, $700,000	
February 25, 2018	Chris Breen	Providence Bruins	1-year, $650,000	
April 10, 2018	Karson Kuhlman	Minnesota–Duluth Bulldogs	2-year, $1.525 million entry-level contract	
May 3, 2018	Connor Clifton	Providence Bruins	2-year, $1.47 million entry-level contract	
June 14, 2018	Martin Bakos	Mora IK	1-year, $700,000	

=== Free agents lost ===
Date	Player	New team	Contract terms (in U.S. dollars)	Ref
July 1, 2017	Chris Casto	Vegas Golden Knights	1-year, $650,000	
July 1, 2017	Brian Ferlin	Edmonton Oilers	1-year	
July 1, 2017	Alex Grant	Minnesota Wild	1-year, $700,000	
July 1, 2017	Dominic Moore	Toronto Maple Leafs	1-year, $1 million	
July 1, 2017	Joe Morrow	Montreal Canadiens	1-year, $650,000	
July 1, 2017	Zac Rinaldo	Arizona Coyotes	1-year, $700,000	
August 25, 2017	Drew Stafford	New Jersey Devils	1-year, $800,000	
October 1, 2017	Jimmy Hayes	New Jersey Devils	1-year, $700,000	
June 1, 2018	Justin Hickman	Lillehammer	Unknown	

=== Claimed via waivers ===
Player	Previous team	Date	Ref

=== Lost via waivers ===
Player	New team	Date	Ref
Malcolm Subban	Vegas Golden Knights	October 3, 2017	

=== Players released ===
Date	Player	Via	Ref

=== Lost via retirement ===
Date	Player	Ref

=== Player signings ===
Date	Player	Contract terms (in U.S. dollars)	Ref
June 28, 2017	Noel Acciari	2-year, $725,000	
July 5, 2017	Tim Schaller	1-year, $775,000	
July 14, 2017	Malcolm Subban	2-year, $1.3 million	
July 14, 2017	Zane McIntyre	2-year, $1.3 million	
July 17, 2017	Austin Czarnik	1-year, $675,000	
July 26, 2017	Ryan Spooner	1-year, $2.825 million	
September 14, 2017	David Pastrnak	6-year, $40 million	
September 26, 2017	Jack Studnicka	3-year, $2.775 million entry-level contract	
March 10, 2018	Cameron Hughes	3-year, $2.775 million entry-level contract	
March 13, 2018	Trent Frederic	3-year, $3.4125 million entry-level contract	
March 18, 2018	Ryan Donato	2-year, $2.7 million entry-level contract	
March 21, 2018	Wiley Sherman	2-year, $1.85 million entry-level contract	
March 28, 2018	Zdeno Chara	1-year, $6.75 million contract extension	
March 30, 2018	Jordan Szwarz	1-year, $650,000 contract extension	
June 13, 2018	Urho Vaakanainen	3-year, $4 million entry-level contract	
June 15, 2018	Matt Grzelcyk	2-year, $2.8 million contract extension	

== Draft picks ==
Below are the Boston Bruins' selections at the 2017 NHL entry draft, which was held on June 23 and 24, 2017 at the United Center in Chicago.

Round	#	Player	Pos	Nationality	College/Junior/Club team (League)
1	18	Urho Vaakanainen	D	Finland	JYP (Liiga)
2	53^{1}	Jack Studnicka	C	Canada	Oshawa Generals (OHL)
4	111	Jeremy Swayman	G	United States	Sioux City Musketeers (USHL)
6	173	Cedric Pare	C	Canada	Saint John Sea Dogs (QMJHL)
7	195^{2}	Victor Berglund	D	Sweden	Modo Hockey (J20 SuperElit)
7	204	Daniel Bukac	D	Czech Republic	Brandon Wheat Kings (WHL)

Notes:

1. The Edmonton Oilers' second-round pick went to the Boston Bruins as compensation for Edmonton hiring Peter Chiarelli as their president and general manager on April 25, 2015.
2. The Florida Panthers' seventh-round pick went to the Boston Bruins as the result of a trade on June 25, 2016 that sent a seventh-round pick in 2016 to Florida in exchange for this pick.
