= 2017–18 Nashville Predators season =

Professional ice hockey team season

2017–18 Nashville Predators
- Presidents' Trophy winners
- Central Division champions
- Division: 1st Central
- Conference: 1st Western
- 2017–18 record: 53–18–11
- Home record: 28–9–4
- Road record: 25–9–7
- Goals for: 267
- Goals against: 211

Team information
- General manager: David Poile
- Coach: Peter Laviolette
- Captain: Roman Josi
- Alternate captains: Mattias Ekholm; Ryan Ellis; Filip Forsberg; Ryan Johansen
- Arena: Bridgestone Arena
- Average attendance: 17,307
- Minor league affiliates: Milwaukee Admirals (AHL); Norfolk Admirals (ECHL) (Note: Until November 28, 2017)

Team leaders
- Goals: Viktor Arvidsson (29)
- Assists: P. K. Subban (43)
- Points: Filip Forsberg (64)
- Penalty minutes: Austin Watson (123)
- Plus/minus: Filip Forsberg (+27)
- Wins: Pekka Rinne (42)
- Goals against average: Pekka Rinne (2.31)

The 2017–18 Nashville Predators season was the 20th season for the National Hockey League (NHL) franchise that was established on June 25, 1997. The team reached the playoffs for the fourth consecutive season, and went from the worst team to qualify for the playoffs the season before to the NHL's top team, winning the Central Division and winning the Presidents' Trophy, both for the first time in team history. However, the Predators were eliminated in the Second Round of the playoffs, as they were upset by the Winnipeg Jets, losing in seven games.

== Standings ==
Central Division
| Pos | Team | GP | W | L | OTL | ROW | GF | GA | GD | Pts |
|---|---|---|---|---|---|---|---|---|---|---|
| 1 | p – Nashville Predators | 82 | 53 | 18 | 11 | 47 | 267 | 211 | +56 | 117 |
| 2 | x – Winnipeg Jets | 82 | 52 | 20 | 10 | 48 | 277 | 218 | +59 | 114 |
| 3 | x – Minnesota Wild | 82 | 45 | 26 | 11 | 42 | 253 | 232 | +21 | 101 |
| 4 | x – Colorado Avalanche | 82 | 43 | 30 | 9 | 41 | 257 | 237 | +20 | 95 |
| 5 | St. Louis Blues | 82 | 44 | 32 | 6 | 41 | 226 | 222 | +4 | 94 |
| 6 | Dallas Stars | 82 | 42 | 32 | 8 | 38 | 235 | 225 | +10 | 92 |
| 7 | Chicago Blackhawks | 82 | 33 | 39 | 10 | 32 | 229 | 256 | −27 | 76 |

Source: National Hockey League
p – Clinched Presidents' Trophy; x – Clinched playoff spot

== Schedule and results ==
=== Preseason ===
The preseason schedule was published on June 19, 2017.

2017 preseason game log: 2–2–2 (home: 1–1–2; road: 1–1–0)
| # | Date | Visitor | Score | Home | OT | Decision | Attendance | Record | Recap |
|---|---|---|---|---|---|---|---|---|---|
| 1 | September 19 | Florida | 5–3 | Nashville | | Saros | — | 0–1–0 | Recap |
| 2 | September 19 | Florida | 2–3 | Nashville | OT | Lindback | — | 1–1–0 | Recap |
| 3 | September 22 | Nashville | 1–3 | Tampa Bay | | Saros | 15,504 | 1–2–0 | Recap |
| 4 | September 24 | Nashville | 5–3 | Columbus | | Lindback | 12,044 | 2–2–0 | Recap |
| 5 | September 28 | Columbus | 4–3 | Nashville | SO | Rinne | 16,052 | 2–2–1 | Recap |
| 6 | September 30 | Tampa Bay | 3–2 | Nashville | OT | Rinne | 17,113 | 2–2–2 | Recap |

=== Regular season ===
The regular season schedule was released on June 22, 2017.

2017–18 game log

October: 5–4–2 (home: 3–1–1; road: 2–3–1)
| # | Date | Visitor | Score | Home | OT | Decision | Attendance | Record | Pts | Recap |
|---|---|---|---|---|---|---|---|---|---|---|
| 1 | October 5 | Nashville | 3–4 | Boston | | Rinne | 17,565 | 0–1–0 | 0 | Recap |
| 2 | October 7 | Nashville | 0–4 | Pittsburgh | | Saros | 18,645 | 0–2–0 | 0 | Recap |
| 3 | October 10 | Philadelphia | 5–6 | Nashville | | Rinne | 17,194 | 1–2–0 | 2 | Recap |
| 4 | October 12 | Dallas | 1–4 | Nashville | | Rinne | 17,113 | 2–2–0 | 4 | Recap |
| 5 | October 14 | Nashville | 1–2 | Chicago | OT | Rinne | 21,564 | 2–2–1 | 5 | Recap |
| 6 | October 17 | Colorado | 1–4 | Nashville | | Rinne | 17,113 | 3–2–1 | 7 | Recap |
| 7 | October 19 | Nashville | 1–0 | Philadelphia | | Rinne | 19,396 | 4–2–1 | 9 | Recap |
| 8 | October 21 | Nashville | 2–4 | NY Rangers | | Saros | 17,181 | 4–3–1 | 9 | Recap |
| 9 | October 24 | Calgary | 3–2 | Nashville | SO | Rinne | 17,113 | 4–3–2 | 10 | Recap |
| 10 | October 27 | Nashville | 2–1 | Chicago | | Rinne | 21,524 | 5–3–2 | 12 | Recap |
| 11 | October 28 | NY Islanders | 6–2 | Nashville | | Saros | 17,113 | 5–4–2 | 12 | Recap |

November: 10–3–1 (home: 6–1–0; road: 4–2–1)
| # | Date | Visitor | Score | Home | OT | Decision | Attendance | Record | Pts | Recap |
|---|---|---|---|---|---|---|---|---|---|---|
| 12 | November 1 | Nashville | 1–4 | San Jose | | Rinne | 16,543 | 5–5–2 | 12 | Recap |
| 13 | November 3 | Nashville | 5–3 | Anaheim | | Rinne | 15,523 | 6–5–2 | 14 | Recap |
| 14 | November 4 | Nashville | 4–3 | Los Angeles | OT | Saros | 18,230 | 7–5–2 | 16 | Recap |
| 15 | November 7 | Nashville | 3–1 | Columbus | | Rinne | 14,996 | 8–5–2 | 18 | Recap |
| 16 | November 11 | Pittsburgh | 4–5 | Nashville | SO | Rinne | 17,397 | 9–5–2 | 20 | Recap |
| 17 | November 14 | Washington | 3–6 | Nashville | | Rinne | 17,113 | 10–5–2 | 22 | Recap |
| 18 | November 16 | Nashville | 4–6 | Minnesota | | Rinne | 18,888 | 10–6–2 | 22 | Recap |
| 19 | November 18 | Colorado | 2–5 | Nashville | | Rinne | 17,113 | 11–6–2 | 24 | Recap |
| 20 | November 20 | Winnipeg | 3–5 | Nashville | | Rinne | 17,113 | 12–6–2 | 26 | Recap |
| 21 | November 22 | Montreal | 2–3 | Nashville | SO | Rinne | 17,113 | 13–6–2 | 28 | Recap |
| 22 | November 24 | Nashville | 2–0 | St. Louis | | Rinne | 19,033 | 14–6–2 | 30 | Recap |
| 23 | November 26 | Nashville | 3–4 | Carolina | SO | Saros | 11,133 | 14–6–3 | 31 | Recap |
| 24 | November 28 | Chicago | 2–3 | Nashville | | Rinne | 17,187 | 15–6–3 | 33 | Recap |
| 25 | November 30 | Vancouver | 5–3 | Nashville | | Rinne | 17,113 | 15–7–3 | 33 | Recap |

December: 8–3–2 (home: 3–2–1; road: 5–1–1)
| # | Date | Visitor | Score | Home | OT | Decision | Attendance | Record | Pts | Recap |
|---|---|---|---|---|---|---|---|---|---|---|
| 26 | December 2 | Anaheim | 2–3 | Nashville | SO | Rinne | 17,113 | 16–7–3 | 35 | Recap |
| 27 | December 4 | Boston | 3–5 | Nashville | | Rinne | 17,113 | 17–7–3 | 37 | Recap |
| 28 | December 5 | Nashville | 5–2 | Dallas | | Saros | 18,023 | 18–7–3 | 39 | Recap |
| 29 | December 8 | Vegas | 4–3 | Nashville | SO | Rinne | 17,125 | 18–7–4 | 40 | Recap |
| 30 | December 13 | Nashville | 7–1 | Vancouver | | Rinne | 16,806 | 19–7–4 | 42 | Recap |
| 31 | December 14 | Nashville | 4–0 | Edmonton | | Saros | 18,347 | 20–7–4 | 44 | Recap |
| 32 | December 16 | Nashville | 2–0 | Calgary | | Rinne | 18,618 | 21–7–4 | 46 | Recap |
| 33 | December 19 | Winnipeg | 6–4 | Nashville | | Rinne | 17,432 | 21–8–4 | 46 | Recap |
| 34 | December 21 | Carolina | 4–1 | Nashville | | Rinne | 17,492 | 21–9–4 | 46 | Recap |
| 35 | December 23 | Nashville | 3–4 | Dallas | SO | Saros | 18,532 | 21–9–5 | 47 | Recap |
| 36 | December 27 | Nashville | 2–1 | St. Louis | | Rinne | 19,097 | 22–9–5 | 49 | Recap |
| 37 | December 29 | Nashville | 2–4 | Minnesota | | Rinne | 19,147 | 22–10–5 | 49 | Recap |
| 38 | December 30 | Minnesota | 0–3 | Nashville | | Saros | 17,459 | 23–10–5 | 51 | Recap |

January: 6–2–2 (home: 4–1–1; road: 2–1–1)
| # | Date | Visitor | Score | Home | OT | Decision | Attendance | Record | Pts | Recap |
|---|---|---|---|---|---|---|---|---|---|---|
| 39 | January 2 | Nashville | 0–3 | Vegas | | Rinne | 18,171 | 23–11–5 | 51 | Recap |
| 40 | January 4 | Nashville | 2–3 | Arizona | OT | Saros | 13,190 | 23–11–6 | 52 | Recap |
| 41 | January 6 | Nashville | 4–3 | Los Angeles | | Rinne | 18,230 | 24–11–6 | 54 | Recap |
| 42 | January 9 | Edmonton | 1–2 | Nashville | | Rinne | 17,188 | 25–11–6 | 56 | Recap |
| 43 | January 16 | Vegas | 0–1 | Nashville | | Saros | 17,150 | 26–11–6 | 58 | Recap |
| 44 | January 18 | Arizona | 2–3 | Nashville | SO | Rinne | 17,138 | 27–11–6 | 60 | Recap |
| 45 | January 20 | Florida | 3–4 | Nashville | | Rinne | 17,441 | 28–11–6 | 62 | Recap |
| 46 | January 23 | Tampa Bay | 4–3 | Nashville | OT | Saros | 17,332 | 28–11–7 | 63 | Recap |
| 47 | January 25 | Nashville | 3–0 | New Jersey | | Rinne | 14,039 | 29–11–7 | 65 | Recap |
| 48 | January 30 | Chicago | 2–1 | Nashville | | Saros | 17,172 | 29–12–7 | 65 | Recap |

February: 10–2–2 (home: 6–2–0; road: 4–0–2)
| # | Date | Visitor | Score | Home | OT | Decision | Attendance | Record | Pts | Recap |
|---|---|---|---|---|---|---|---|---|---|---|
| 49 | February 1 | Los Angeles | 0–5 | Nashville | | Rinne | 17,384 | 30–12–7 | 67 | Recap |
| 50 | February 3 | NY Rangers | 2–5 | Nashville | | Rinne | 17,543 | 31–12–7 | 69 | Recap |
| 51 | February 5 | Nashville | 5–4 | NY Islanders | OT | Rinne | 10,217 | 32–12–7 | 71 | Recap |
| 52 | February 7 | Nashville | 2–3 | Toronto | SO | Rinne | 18,878 | 32–12–8 | 72 | Recap |
| 53 | February 8 | Nashville | 3–4 | Ottawa | OT | Saros | 14,632 | 32–12–9 | 73 | Recap |
| 54 | February 10 | Nashville | 3–2 | Montreal | SO | Rinne | 21,302 | 33–12–9 | 75 | Recap |
| 55 | February 13 | St. Louis | 3–4 | Nashville | OT | Rinne | 17,221 | 34–12–9 | 77 | Recap |
| 56 | February 15 | Calgary | 4–3 | Nashville | | Rinne | 17,326 | 34–13–9 | 77 | Recap |
| 57 | February 17 | Detroit | 3–1 | Nashville | | Saros | 17,561 | 34–14–9 | 77 | Recap |
| 58 | February 19 | Ottawa | 2–5 | Nashville | | Rinne | 17,177 | 35–14–9 | 79 | Recap |
| 59 | February 20 | Nashville | 3–2 | Detroit | | Saros | 19,515 | 36–14–9 | 81 | Recap |
| 60 | February 22 | San Jose | 1–7 | Nashville | | Rinne | 17,354 | 37–14–9 | 83 | Recap |
| 61 | February 25 | St. Louis | 0–4 | Nashville | | Rinne | 17,523 | 38–14–9 | 85 | Recap |
| 62 | February 27 | Nashville | 6–5 | Winnipeg | | Rinne | 15,321 | 39–14–9 | 87 | Recap |

March: 11–3–2 (home: 5–2–1; road: 6–1–1)
| # | Date | Visitor | Score | Home | OT | Decision | Attendance | Record | Pts | Recap |
|---|---|---|---|---|---|---|---|---|---|---|
| 63 | March 1 | Nashville | 4–2 | Edmonton | | Rinne | 18,347 | 40–14–9 | 89 | Recap |
| 64 | March 2 | Nashville | 4–3 | Vancouver | OT | Saros | 18,470 | 41–14–9 | 91 | Recap |
| 65 | March 4 | Nashville | 4–3 | Colorado | OT | Rinne | 17,618 | 42–14–9 | 93 | Recap |
| 66 | March 6 | Dallas | 0–2 | Nashville | | Rinne | 17,342 | 43–14–9 | 95 | Recap |
| 67 | March 8 | Anaheim | 2–4 | Nashville | | Rinne | 17,475 | 44–14–9 | 97 | Recap |
| 68 | March 10 | New Jersey | 3–2 | Nashville | SO | Saros | 17,545 | 44–14–10 | 98 | Recap |
| 69 | March 13 | Winnipeg | 1–3 | Nashville | | Rinne | 17,534 | 45–14–10 | 100 | Recap |
| 70 | March 15 | Nashville | 3–2 | Arizona | | Rinne | 14,527 | 46–14–10 | 102 | Recap |
| 71 | March 16 | Nashville | 4–2 | Colorado | | Saros | 17,273 | 47–14–10 | 104 | Recap |
| 72 | March 19 | Nashville | 4–0 | Buffalo | | Rinne | 17,507 | 48–14–10 | 106 | Recap |
| 73 | March 22 | Toronto | 5–2 | Nashville | | Rinne | 17,550 | 48–15–10 | 106 | Recap |
| 74 | March 24 | Nashville | 1–4 | Minnesota | | Rinne | 19,303 | 48–16–10 | 106 | Recap |
| 75 | March 25 | Nashville | 4–5 | Winnipeg | SO | Saros | 15,321 | 48–16–11 | 107 | Recap |
| 76 | March 27 | Minnesota | 1–2 | Nashville | SO | Rinne | 17,424 | 49–16–11 | 109 | Recap |
| 77 | March 29 | San Jose | 3–5 | Nashville | | Saros | 17,543 | 50–16–11 | 111 | Recap |
| 78 | March 31 | Buffalo | 7–4 | Nashville | | Rinne | 17,551 | 50–17–11 | 111 | Recap |

April: 3–1–0 (home: 1–0–0; road: 2–1–0)
| # | Date | Visitor | Score | Home | OT | Decision | Attendance | Record | Pts | Recap |
|---|---|---|---|---|---|---|---|---|---|---|
| 79 | April 1 | Nashville | 4–1 | Tampa Bay | | Saros | 19,092 | 51–17–11 | 113 | Recap |
| 80 | April 3 | Nashville | 1–2 | Florida | | Rinne | 12,147 | 51–18–11 | 113 | Recap |
| 81 | April 5 | Nashville | 4–3 | Washington | | Saros | 18,506 | 52–18–11 | 115 | Recap |
| 82 | April 7 | Columbus | 2–4 | Nashville | | Rinne | 17,594 | 53–18–11 | 117 | Recap |

Legend: Win (2 points) Loss (0 points) Overtime/shootout loss (1 point)

=== Playoffs ===
2018 Stanley Cup playoffs

Western Conference first round vs. (WC2) Colorado Avalanche: Nashville won 4–2
| # | Date | Visitor | Score | Home | OT | Decision | Attendance | Series | Recap |
|---|---|---|---|---|---|---|---|---|---|
| 1 | April 12 | Colorado | 2–5 | Nashville | | Rinne | 17,301 | 1–0 | Recap |
| 2 | April 14 | Colorado | 4–5 | Nashville | | Rinne | 17,369 | 2–0 | Recap |
| 3 | April 16 | Nashville | 3–5 | Colorado | | Rinne | 18,087 | 2–1 | Recap |
| 4 | April 18 | Nashville | 3–2 | Colorado | | Rinne | 18,087 | 3–1 | Recap |
| 5 | April 20 | Colorado | 2–1 | Nashville | | Rinne | 17,504 | 3–2 | Recap |
| 6 | April 22 | Nashville | 5–0 | Colorado | | Rinne | 18,087 | 4–2 | Recap |

Western Conference second round vs. (C2) Winnipeg Jets: Winnipeg won 4–3
| # | Date | Visitor | Score | Home | OT | Decision | Attendance | Series | Recap |
|---|---|---|---|---|---|---|---|---|---|
| 1 | April 27 | Winnipeg | 4–1 | Nashville | | Rinne | 17,307 | 0–1 | Recap |
| 2 | April 29 | Winnipeg | 4–5 | Nashville | 2OT | Rinne | 17,274 | 1–1 | Recap |
| 3 | May 1 | Nashville | 4–7 | Winnipeg | | Rinne | 15,321 | 1–2 | Recap |
| 4 | May 3 | Nashville | 2–1 | Winnipeg | | Rinne | 15,321 | 2–2 | Recap |
| 5 | May 5 | Winnipeg | 6–2 | Nashville | | Rinne | 17,513 | 2–3 | Recap |
| 6 | May 7 | Nashville | 4–0 | Winnipeg | | Rinne | 15,321 | 3–3 | Recap |
| 7 | May 10 | Winnipeg | 5–1 | Nashville | | Rinne | 17,523 | 3–4 | Recap |

Legend: Win Loss

== Player statistics ==
Final Stats

=== Skaters ===
Regular season
| Player | GP | G | A | Pts | +/− | PIM |
|---|---|---|---|---|---|---|
| Filip Forsberg | 67 | 26 | 38 | 64 | 27 | 38 |
| Viktor Arvidsson | 78 | 29 | 32 | 61 | 20 | 36 |
| P. K. Subban | 82 | 16 | 43 | 59 | 18 | 82 |
| Ryan Johansen | 79 | 15 | 39 | 54 | 13 | 78 |
| Roman Josi | 75 | 14 | 39 | 53 | 24 | 24 |
| Craig Smith | 79 | 25 | 26 | 51 | 20 | 24 |
| Kevin Fiala | 80 | 23 | 25 | 48 | 20 | 26 |
| Kyle Turris^{†} | 65 | 13 | 29 | 42 | 22 | 24 |
| Calle Jarnkrok | 68 | 16 | 19 | 35 | 20 | 12 |
| Mattias Ekholm | 81 | 10 | 24 | 34 | 25 | 46 |
| Ryan Ellis | 44 | 9 | 23 | 32 | 26 | 6 |
| Colton Sissons | 81 | 9 | 18 | 27 | 2 | 42 |
| Nick Bonino | 71 | 12 | 13 | 25 | 4 | 20 |
| Scott Hartnell | 62 | 13 | 11 | 24 | −3 | 82 |
| Austin Watson | 76 | 14 | 5 | 19 | 2 | 123 |
| Alexei Emelin | 76 | 1 | 8 | 9 | 9 | 40 |
| Miikka Salomaki | 58 | 2 | 6 | 8 | −8 | 34 |
| Pontus Aberg^{‡} | 37 | 2 | 6 | 8 | 8 | 8 |
| Matt Irwin | 50 | 2 | 6 | 8 | 2 | 8 |
| Ryan Hartman^{†} | 21 | 3 | 3 | 6 | −4 | 14 |
| Yannick Weber | 47 | 2 | 3 | 5 | 2 | 16 |
| Mike Fisher | 16 | 2 | 2 | 4 | 0 | 8 |
| Anthony Bitetto | 32 | 1 | 2 | 3 | −1 | 27 |
| Samuel Girard^{‡} | 5 | 1 | 2 | 3 | −3 | 2 |
| Frédérick Gaudreau | 20 | 0 | 3 | 3 | 0 | 2 |
| Cody McLeod^{‡} | 23 | 1 | 1 | 2 | 0 | 72 |
| Eeli Tolvanen | 3 | 0 | 0 | 0 | 0 | 0 |

Playoffs
| Player | GP | G | A | Pts | +/– | PIM |
|---|---|---|---|---|---|---|
| Filip Forsberg | 13 | 7 | 9 | 16 | 2 | 2 |
| Ryan Johansen | 13 | 5 | 9 | 14 | 3 | 2 |
| Viktor Arvidsson | 13 | 5 | 4 | 9 | −1 | 6 |
| P. K. Subban | 13 | 4 | 5 | 9 | −2 | 10 |
| Austin Watson | 13 | 5 | 3 | 8 | 3 | 12 |
| Mattias Ekholm | 13 | 1 | 7 | 8 | 4 | 12 |
| Colton Sissons | 13 | 3 | 4 | 7 | −2 | 8 |
| Nick Bonino | 13 | 2 | 3 | 5 | −1 | 9 |
| Ryan Ellis | 13 | 0 | 5 | 5 | −4 | 8 |
| Kevin Fiala | 12 | 3 | 1 | 4 | −3 | 8 |
| Craig Smith | 13 | 2 | 2 | 4 | −3 | 2 |
| Roman Josi | 13 | 0 | 4 | 4 | −4 | 2 |
| Ryan Hartman | 9 | 2 | 1 | 3 | 0 | 10 |
| Kyle Turris | 13 | 0 | 3 | 3 | −3 | 6 |
| Mike Fisher | 12 | 1 | 0 | 1 | 0 | 2 |
| Yannick Weber | 4 | 1 | 0 | 1 | 2 | 2 |
| Calle Jarnkrok | 7 | 0 | 1 | 1 | −3 | 0 |
| Matt Irwin | 12 | 0 | 0 | 0 | 1 | 2 |
| Alexei Emelin | 10 | 0 | 0 | 0 | −1 | 0 |
| Miikka Salomaki | 8 | 0 | 0 | 0 | −1 | 2 |
| Scott Hartnell | 4 | 0 | 0 | 0 | −1 | 0 |

=== Goaltenders ===
Regular season
| Player | GP | GS | TOI | W | L | OT | GA | GAA | SA | SV% | SO | G | A | PIM |
|---|---|---|---|---|---|---|---|---|---|---|---|---|---|---|
| Pekka Rinne | 59 | 59 | 3,475:27 | 42 | 13 | 4 | 134 | 2.31 | 1840 | .927 | 8 | 0 | 1 | 6 |
| Juuse Saros | 26 | 23 | 1,496:40 | 11 | 5 | 7 | 61 | 2.45 | 810 | .925 | 3 | 0 | 3 | 0 |

Playoffs
| Player | GP | GS | TOI | W | L | GA | GAA | SA | SV% | SO | G | A | PIM |
|---|---|---|---|---|---|---|---|---|---|---|---|---|---|
| Pekka Rinne | 13 | 13 | 685 | 7 | 6 | 35 | 3.07 | 363 | .904 | 2 | 0 | 0 | 0 |
| Juuse Saros | 4 | 0 | 114 | 0 | 0 | 2 | 1.05 | 42 | .952 | 0 | 0 | 0 | 0 |

^{†}Denotes player spent time with another team before joining the Predators. Stats reflect time with the Predators only.
^{‡}Traded mid-season. Stats reflect time with the Predators only.
Bold/italics denotes franchise record

== Transactions ==
The Predators have been involved in the following transactions during the 2017–18 season.

=== Trades ===
| Date | Details | | Ref |
|---|---|---|---|
| July 1, 2017 | To Colorado Avalanche Colin Wilson | To Nashville Predators 4th-round pick in 2019 |
| July 1, 2017 | To Vegas Golden Knights 3rd-round pick in 2019 | To Nashville Predators Alexei Emelin |
| November 5, 2017 | To Colorado Avalanche Samuel Girard; Vladislav Kamenev; 2nd-round pick in 2018 | To Nashville Predators Kyle Turris |
| February 3, 2018 | To Dallas Stars Andrew O'Brien | To Nashville Predators Mark McNeill |
| February 25, 2018 | To Edmonton Oilers Pontus Aberg | To Nashville Predators Mark Letestu |
| February 25, 2018 | To Columbus Blue Jackets Mark Letestu | To Nashville Predators 4th-round pick in 2018 |
| February 25, 2018 | To San Jose Sharks 6th-round pick in 2018 | To Nashville Predators Brandon Bollig; Troy Grosenick |
| February 26, 2018 | To Chicago Blackhawks Victor Ejdsell; 1st-round pick in 2018; 4th-round pick in 2018 | To Nashville Predators Ryan Hartman; 5th-round pick in 2018 |
| February 26, 2018 | To Arizona Coyotes Pierre-Cedric Labrie; Trevor Murphy | To Nashville Predators Tyler Gaudet; John Ramage |

=== Free agents acquired ===
| Date | Player | Former team | Contract terms (in U.S. dollars) | Ref |
|---|---|---|---|---|
| July 1, 2017 | Nick Bonino | Pittsburgh Penguins | 4-year, $16.4 million | |
| July 1, 2017 | Matt O'Connor | Ottawa Senators | 1-year, $650,000 | |
| July 1, 2017 | Scott Hartnell | Columbus Blue Jackets | 1-year, $1 million | |
| July 1, 2017 | Anders Lindback | Rögle BK | 1-year, $650,000 | |
| July 1, 2017 | Pierre-Cedric Labrie | Chicago Blackhawks | 1-year, $650,000 | |
| April 2, 2018 | Tanner Jeannot | Moose Jaw Warriors | 3-year, $2.14 million entry-level contract | |
| April 3, 2018 | Niclas Westerholm | SaiPa | 3-year, $2.775 million entry-level contract | |
| April 26, 2018 | Miroslav Svoboda | HC Plzeň | 2-year, $1.85 million entry-level contract | |
| May 7, 2018 | Filip Pyrochta | HC Bílí Tygři Liberec | 2-year, $1.85 million entry-level contract | |
| May 9, 2018 | Carl Persson | Karlskrona HK | 2-year, $1.45 million entry-level contract | |

=== Free agents lost ===
| Date | Player | New team | Contract terms (in U.S. dollars) | Ref |
|---|---|---|---|---|
| July 1, 2017 | Brad Hunt | Vegas Golden Knights | 2-year, $1.3 million | |
| July 2, 2017 | Mike Liambas | Anaheim Ducks | 1-year, $650,000 | |
| August 14, 2017 | Marek Mazanec | Slovan Bratislava | Unknown | |
| August 17, 2017 | Jaynen Rissling | Allen Americans | Unknown | |
| May 18, 2018 | Petter Granberg | Skellefteå AIK | 3-year | |

=== Claimed via waivers ===
| Player | Previous team | Date | Ref |

=== Lost via waivers ===
| Player | New team | Date | Ref |
|---|---|---|---|
| Cody McLeod | New York Rangers | January 25, 2018 | |

=== Players released ===
| Date | Player | Via | Ref |

=== Lost via retirement ===
| Date | Player | Ref |
|---|---|---|
| August 1, 2017 | Mike Fisher | |
| September 13, 2017 | Vernon Fiddler | |
| May 12, 2018 | Mike Fisher | |

=== Player signings ===
| Date | Player | Contract terms (in U.S. dollars) | Ref |
|---|---|---|---|
| July 17, 2017 | Frederick Gaudreau | 3-year, $2 million | |
| July 18, 2017 | Pontus Aberg | 2-year, $1.3 million | |
| July 21, 2017 | Marek Mazanec | 1-year, $650,000 | |
| July 22, 2017 | Viktor Arvidsson | 7-year, $29.75 million | |
| July 24, 2017 | Austin Watson | 3-year, $3.3 million | |
| July 28, 2017 | Ryan Johansen | 8-year, $64 million | |
| November 5, 2017 | Kyle Turris | 6-year, $36 million contract extension | |
| January 9, 2018 | Anthony Bitetto | 1-year, $650,000 contract extension | |
| January 9, 2018 | Matt Irwin | 2-year, $1.35 million contract extension | |
| January 9, 2018 | Yannick Weber | 2-year, $1.35 million contract extension | |
| February 26, 2018 | Mike Fisher | 1-year, $1 million | |
| March 29, 2018 | Eeli Tolvanen | 3-year, $9.4375 million entry-level contract | |

== Draft picks ==
Below are the Nashville Predators' selections at the 2017 NHL entry draft, which was held on June 23 and 24, 2017 at the United Center in Chicago.

| Round | # | Player | Pos | Nationality | College/Junior/Club team (League) |
|---|---|---|---|---|---|
| 1 | 30 | Eeli Tolvanen | RW | Finland | Sioux City Musketeers (USHL) |
| 2 | 61 | Grant Mismash | C | United States | U.S. NTDP (USHL) |
| 3 | 92 | David Farrance | D | United States | U.S. NTDP (USHL) |
| 5 | 154 | Tomas Vomacka | G | Czech Republic | Corpus Christi IceRays (NAHL) |
| 6 | 176^{1} | Pavel Koltygin | C | Russia | Drummondville Voltigeurs (QMJHL) |
| 7 | 216 | Jacob Paquette | D | Canada | Kingston Frontenacs (OHL) |

=== Draft notes ===
1. The New York Rangers' sixth-round pick went to the Nashville Predators as the result of a trade on July 1, 2015, that sent Magnus Hellberg to New York in exchange for this pick.
