= 2017–18 Winnipeg Jets season =

National Hockey League team season

2017–18 Winnipeg Jets
- Division: 2nd Central
- Conference: 2nd Western
- 2017–18 record: 52–20–10
- Home record: 32–7–2
- Road record: 20–13–8
- Goals for: 277
- Goals against: 218

Team information
- General manager: Kevin Cheveldayoff
- Coach: Paul Maurice
- Captain: Blake Wheeler
- Alternate captains: Dustin Byfuglien; Mark Scheifele
- Arena: Bell MTS Place
- Average attendance: 15,321
- Minor league affiliates: Manitoba Moose (AHL); Jacksonville Icemen (ECHL)

Team leaders
- Goals: Patrik Laine (44)
- Assists: Blake Wheeler (68)
- Points: Blake Wheeler (91)
- Penalty minutes: Dustin Byfuglien (112)
- Plus/minus: Mark Scheifele (+19)
- Wins: Connor Hellebuyck (44)
- Goals against average: Connor Hellebuyck (2.36)

The 2017–18 Winnipeg Jets season was the 35th season of play for the National Hockey League (NHL) franchise that was established on June 22, 1979, 43rd season for the organization overall, and the seventh in Winnipeg, since the franchise relocated from Atlanta prior to the start of the 2011–12 NHL season. The Jets clinched their second playoff spot since relocating from Atlanta after beating the Nashville Predators 5–4 in a shootout on March 25, 2018. The Jets finished the season with 114 points, the second-best record in the NHL. Both were the best-ever finishes for the Thrashers/Jets franchise before they were surpassed by the 2024-25 Winnipeg Jets with 56 wins and 116 Points.

On April 11, 2018, the Jets won their first playoff game since 1996 when they defeated the Minnesota Wild 3–2 ending a 9-game playoff losing streak. On April 20, 2018, the team won its first playoff series since 1987 when they defeated the Wild 5–0 and advanced to the Second Round. They then took the Presidents' Trophy-winning Nashville Predators to seven games to advance to the Western Conference Final – the deepest playoff run for a Winnipeg-based NHL team. The original Jets only got as far as the second round during their run in Winnipeg, in 1985 and 1987. Their season would come to an end during the Western Conference Final where they lost to the Vegas Golden Knights in five games.

== Standings ==
Central Division
Pos	Team	GP	W	L	OTL	ROW	GF	GA	GD	Pts
1	p – Nashville Predators	82	53	18	11	47	267	211	+56	117
2	x – Winnipeg Jets	82	52	20	10	48	277	218	+59	114
3	x – Minnesota Wild	82	45	26	11	42	253	232	+21	101
4	x – Colorado Avalanche	82	43	30	9	41	257	237	+20	95
5	St. Louis Blues	82	44	32	6	41	226	222	+4	94
6	Dallas Stars	82	42	32	8	38	235	225	+10	92
7	Chicago Blackhawks	82	33	39	10	32	229	256	−27	76

Source: National Hockey League
p – Clinched Presidents' Trophy; x – Clinched playoff spot

== Schedule and results ==
=== Pre-season ===
The pre-season schedule was published on June 12, 2017.

2017 pre-season game log: 2–3–2 (Home: 2–1–1; Road: 0–2–1)
#	Date	Visitor	Score	Home	OT	Decision	Attendance	Record	Recap
1	September 18	Minnesota	3–2	Winnipeg	SO	Hellebuyck	15,294	0–0–1	Recap
2	September 20	Edmonton	4–1	Winnipeg		Mason	15,294	0–1–1	Recap
3	September 21	Winnipeg	0–1	Minnesota		Hellebuyck	16,518	0–2–1	Recap
4	September 23	Winnipeg	2–6	Edmonton		Hutchinson	18,347	0–3–1	Recap
5	September 25	Calgary	2–5	Winnipeg		Mason	15,294	1–3–1	Recap
6	September 27	Ottawa	3–5	Winnipeg		Hellebuyck	15,294	2–3–1	Recap
7	September 30	Winnipeg	2–3	Calgary	SO	Mason	19,289	2–3–2	Recap

=== Regular season ===
The regular season schedule was released on June 22, 2017.

2017–18 game log

October: 6–3–2 (Home: 3–2–0; Road: 3–1–2)
#	Date	Visitor	Score	Home	OT	Decision	Attendance	Record	Pts	Recap
1	October 4	Toronto	7–2	Winnipeg		Mason	15,321	0–1–0	0	Recap
2	October 7	Winnipeg	3–6	Calgary		Mason	19,289	0–2–0	0	Recap
3	October 9	Winnipeg	5–2	Edmonton		Hellebuyck	18,347	1–2–0	2	Recap
4	October 12	Winnipeg	4–2	Vancouver		Hellebuyck	15,589	2–2–0	4	Recap
5	October 14	Carolina	1–2	Winnipeg		Hellebuyck	15,321	3–2–0	6	Recap
6	October 17	Columbus	5–2	Winnipeg		Mason	15,321	3–3–0	6	Recap
7	October 20	Minnesota	3–4	Winnipeg		Hellebuyck	15,321	4–3–0	8	Recap
8	October 26	Winnipeg	1–2	Pittsburgh	OT	Hellebuyck	18,445	4–3–1	9	Recap
9	October 27	Winnipeg	1–2	Columbus	OT	Mason	14,224	4–3–2	10	Recap
10	October 29	Pittsburgh	1–7	Winnipeg		Hellebuyck	15,321	5–3–2	12	Recap
11	October 31	Winnipeg	2–1	Minnesota		Hellebuyck	18,814	6–3–2	14	Recap

November: 9–3–2 (Home: 5–0–1; Road: 4–3–1)
#	Date	Visitor	Score	Home	OT	Decision	Attendance	Record	Pts	Recap
12	November 2	Dallas	2–5	Winnipeg		Hellebuyck	15,321	7–3–2	16	Recap
13	November 4	Montreal	5–4	Winnipeg	OT	Hellebuyck	15,321	7–3–3	17	Recap
14	November 6	Winnipeg	4–1	Dallas		Hellebuyck	17,895	8–3–3	19	Recap
15	November 10	Winnipeg	2–5	Vegas		Hellebuyck	18,110	8–4–3	19	Recap
16	November 11	Winnipeg	4–1	Arizona		Mason	16,078	9–4–3	21	Recap
17	November 14	Arizona	1–4	Winnipeg		Hellebuyck	15,321	10–4–3	23	Recap
18	November 16	Philadelphia	2–3	Winnipeg	SO	Hellebuyck	15,321	11–4–3	25	Recap
19	November 18	New Jersey	2–5	Winnipeg		Hellebuyck	15,321	12–4–3	27	Recap
20	November 20	Winnipeg	3–5	Nashville		Hellebuyck	17,113	12–5–3	27	Recap
21	November 22	Winnipeg	2–1	Los Angeles		Mason	18,230	13–5–3	29	Recap
22	November 24	Winnipeg	4–1	Anaheim		Hellebuyck	16,035	14–5–3	31	Recap
23	November 25	Winnipeg	0–4	San Jose		Mason	17,189	14–6–3	31	Recap
24	November 27	Minnesota	2–7	Winnipeg		Hellebuyck	15,321	15–6–3	33	Recap
25	November 29	Winnipeg	2–3	Colorado	OT	Hellebuyck	13,017	15–6–4	34	Recap

December: 8–5–2 (Home: 6–1–0; Road: 2–4–2)
#	Date	Visitor	Score	Home	OT	Decision	Attendance	Record	Pts	Recap
26	December 1	Vegas	4–7	Winnipeg		Hellebuyck	15,321	16–6–4	36	Recap
27	December 3	Ottawa	0–5	Winnipeg		Hellebuyck	15,321	17–6–4	38	Recap
28	December 5	Winnipeg	1–5	Detroit		Hellebuyck	19,515	17–7–4	38	Recap
29	December 7	Winnipeg	4–6	Florida		Comrie	10,768	17–8–4	38	Recap
30	December 9	Winnipeg	3–4	Tampa Bay	OT	Hellebuyck	19,092	17–8–5	39	Recap
31	December 11	Vancouver	1–5	Winnipeg		Hellebuyck	15,321	18–8–5	41	Recap
32	December 14	Chicago	5–1	Winnipeg		Hellebuyck	15,321	18–9–5	41	Recap
33	December 16	Winnipeg	0–2	St. Louis		Mason	17,964	18–10–5	41	Recap
34	December 17	St. Louis	0–4	Winnipeg		Hellebuyck	15,321	19–10–5	43	Recap
35	December 19	Winnipeg	6–4	Nashville		Hellebuyck	17,432	20–10–5	45	Recap
36	December 21	Winnipeg	1–2	Boston	SO	Hellebuyck	17,565	20–10–6	46	Recap
37	December 23	Winnipeg	2–5	NY Islanders		Mason	13,589	20–11–6	46	Recap
38	December 27	Edmonton	3–4	Winnipeg		Hellebuyck	15,321	21–11–6	48	Recap
39	December 29	NY Islanders	2–4	Winnipeg		Hellebuyck	15,321	22–11–6	50	Recap
40	December 31	Winnipeg	5–0	Edmonton		Hellebuyck	18,347	23–11–6	52	Recap

January: 7–2–2 (Home: 4–0–0; Road: 3–2–2)
#	Date	Visitor	Score	Home	OT	Decision	Attendance	Record	Pts	Recap
41	January 2	Winnipeg	2–3	Colorado	OT	Hellebuyck	13,058	23–11–7	53	Recap
42	January 5	Buffalo	3–4	Winnipeg		Hellebuyck	15,321	24–11–7	55	Recap
43	January 7	San Jose	1–4	Winnipeg		Hellebuyck	15,321	25–11–7	57	Recap
44	January 9	Winnipeg	7–4	Buffalo		Mason	17,398	26–11–7	59	Recap
45	January 12	Winnipeg	1–2	Chicago		Hellebuyck	21,588	26–12–7	59	Recap
46	January 13	Winnipeg	1–4	Minnesota		Hellebuyck	19,207	26–13–7	59	Recap
47	January 20	Winnipeg	2–1	Calgary	SO	Hellebuyck	19,289	27–13–7	61	Recap
48	January 21	Vancouver	0–1	Winnipeg		Hellebuyck	15,321	28–13–7	63	Recap
49	January 23	Winnipeg	5–4	San Jose	OT	Hellebuyck	17,237	29–13–7	65	Recap
50	January 25	Winnipeg	3–4	Anaheim	SO	Hellebuyck	17,174	29–13–8	66	Recap
51	January 30	Tampa Bay	1–3	Winnipeg		Hutchinson	15,321	30–13–8	68	Recap

February: 7–4–1 (Home: 5–4–1; Road: 2–0–0)
#	Date	Visitor	Score	Home	OT	Decision	Attendance	Record	Pts	Recap
52	February 1	Vegas	3–2	Winnipeg	OT	Hellebuyck	15,321	30–13–9	69	Recap
53	February 3	Colorado	0–3	Winnipeg		Hellebuyck	15,321	31–13–9	71	Recap
54	February 6	Arizona	3–4	Winnipeg		Hellebuyck	15,321	32–13–9	73	Recap
55	February 9	St. Louis	5–2	Winnipeg		Hellebuyck	15,321	32–14–9	73	Recap
56	February 11	NY Rangers	3–1	Winnipeg		Hellebuyck	15,321	32–15–9	73	Recap
57	February 13	Washington	3–4	Winnipeg	OT	Hellebuyck	15,321	33–15–9	75	Recap
58	February 16	Colorado	1–6	Winnipeg		Hellebuyck	15,321	34–15–9	77	Recap
59	February 18	Florida	2–7	Winnipeg		Hellebuyck	15,321	35–15–9	79	Recap
60	February 20	Los Angeles	4–3	Winnipeg		Hellebuyck	15,321	35–16–9	79	Recap
61	February 23	Winnipeg	4–0	St. Louis		Hellebuyck	18,912	36–16–9	81	Recap
62	February 24	Winnipeg	5–3	Dallas		Hutchinson	18,532	37–16–9	83	Recap
63	February 27	Nashville	6–5	Winnipeg		Hellebuyck	15,321	37–17–9	83	Recap

March: 11–3–1 (Home: 7–0–0; Road: 4–3–1)
#	Date	Visitor	Score	Home	OT	Decision	Attendance	Record	Pts	Recap
64	March 2	Detroit	3–4	Winnipeg		Hellebuyck	15,321	38–17–9	85	Recap
65	March 4	Winnipeg	3–2	Carolina		Hellebuyck	11,407	39–17–9	87	Recap
66	March 6	Winnipeg	3–0	NY Rangers		Mason	18,006	40–17–9	89	Recap
67	March 8	Winnipeg	3–2	New Jersey		Hellebuyck	14,023	41–17–9	91	Recap
68	March 10	Winnipeg	1–2	Philadelphia		Hellebuyck	19,929	41–18–9	91	Recap
69	March 12	Winnipeg	2–3	Washington	OT	Hellebuyck	18,506	41–18–10	92	Recap
70	March 13	Winnipeg	1–3	Nashville		Hutchinson	17,534	41–19–10	92	Recap
71	March 15	Chicago	2–6	Winnipeg		Hellebuyck	15,321	42–19–10	94	Recap
72	March 18	Dallas	2–4	Winnipeg		Hellebuyck	15,321	43–19–10	96	Recap
73	March 20	Los Angeles	1–2	Winnipeg	OT	Comrie	15,321	44–19–10	98	Recap
74	March 23	Anaheim	2–3	Winnipeg	OT	Hellebuyck	15,321	45–19–10	100	Recap
75	March 25	Nashville	4–5	Winnipeg	SO	Hellebuyck	15,321	46–19–10	102	Recap
76	March 27	Boston	4–5	Winnipeg	SO	Hellebuyck	15,321	47–19–10	104	Recap
77	March 29	Winnipeg	2–6	Chicago		Comrie	21,839	47–20–10	104	Recap
78	March 31	Winnipeg	3–1	Toronto		Hellebuyck	19,101	48–20–10	106	Recap

April: 4–0–0 (Home: 2–0–0; Road: 2–0–0)
#	Date	Visitor	Score	Home	OT	Decision	Attendance	Record	Pts	Recap
79	April 2	Winnipeg	6–5	Ottawa		Hellebuyck	17,122	49–20–10	108	Recap
80	April 3	Winnipeg	5–4	Montreal	OT	Mason	21,302	50–20–10	110	Recap
81	April 5	Calgary	1–2	Winnipeg		Hellebuyck	15,321	51–20–10	112	Recap
82	April 7	Chicago	1–4	Winnipeg		Hellebuyck	15,321	52–20–10	114	Recap

Legend: Win (2 points) Loss (0 points) Overtime/shootout loss (1 point)

=== Playoffs ===
2018 Stanley Cup playoffs

Western Conference First Round vs. (C3) Minnesota Wild: Winnipeg won 4–1
#	Date	Visitor	Score	Home	OT	Decision	Attendance	Series	Recap
1	April 11	Minnesota	2–3	Winnipeg		Hellebuyck	15,321	1–0	Recap
2	April 13	Minnesota	1–4	Winnipeg		Hellebuyck	15,321	2–0	Recap
3	April 15	Winnipeg	2–6	Minnesota		Hellebuyck	19,175	2–1	Recap
4	April 17	Winnipeg	2–0	Minnesota		Hellebuyck	19,277	3–1	Recap
5	April 20	Minnesota	0–5	Winnipeg		Hellebuyck	15,321	4–1	Recap

Western Conference Second Round vs. (C1) Nashville Predators: Winnipeg won 4–3
#	Date	Visitor	Score	Home	OT	Decision	Attendance	Series	Recap
1	April 27	Winnipeg	4–1	Nashville		Hellebuyck	17,307	1–0	Recap
2	April 29	Winnipeg	4–5	Nashville	2OT	Hellebuyck	17,274	1–1	Recap
3	May 1	Nashville	4–7	Winnipeg		Hellebuyck	15,321	2–1	Recap
4	May 3	Nashville	2–1	Winnipeg		Hellebuyck	15,321	2–2	Recap
5	May 5	Winnipeg	6–2	Nashville		Hellebuyck	17,513	3–2	Recap
6	May 7	Nashville	4–0	Winnipeg		Hellebuyck	15,321	3–3	Recap
7	May 10	Winnipeg	5–1	Nashville		Hellebuyck	17,523	4–3	Recap

Western Conference Finals vs. (P1) Vegas Golden Knights: Vegas won 4–1
#	Date	Visitor	Score	Home	OT	Decision	Attendance	Series	Recap
1	May 12	Vegas	2–4	Winnipeg		Hellebuyck	15,321	1–0	Recap
2	May 14	Vegas	3–1	Winnipeg		Hellebuyck	15,321	1–1	Recap
3	May 16	Winnipeg	2–4	Vegas		Hellebuyck	18,477	1–2	Recap
4	May 18	Winnipeg	2–3	Vegas		Hellebuyck	18,697	1–3	Recap
5	May 20	Vegas	2–1	Winnipeg		Hellebuyck	15,321	1–4	Recap

Legend: Win Loss

== Player statistics ==
Final Stats

Skaters

Regular season
Player	GP	G	A	Pts	+/−	PIM
Blake Wheeler	81	23	68	91	13	52
Patrik Laine	82	44	26	70	8	24
Nikolaj Ehlers	82	29	31	60	14	26
Mark Scheifele	60	23	37	60	19	18
Kyle Connor	76	31	26	57	8	16
Dustin Byfuglien	69	8	37	45	15	112
Bryan Little	82	16	27	43	2	28
Mathieu Perreault	70	17	22	39	4	38
Tyler Myers	82	6	30	36	9	48
Joel Armia	79	12	17	29	3	22
Andrew Copp	82	9	19	28	17	14
Josh Morrissey	81	7	19	26	15	47
Jacob Trouba	55	3	21	24	9	34
Adam Lowry	45	8	13	21	9	8
Brandon Tanev	61	8	10	18	13	18
Jack Roslovic	31	5	9	14	5	2
Ben Chiarot	57	2	12	14	15	32
Matt Hendricks	60	5	8	13	−1	39
Paul Stastny^{†}	19	4	9	13	6	4
Dmitry Kulikov	62	3	8	11	6	22
Tobias Enstrom	43	1	5	6	8	20
Joe Morrow^{†}	18	1	4	5	7	0
Marko Dano	23	2	1	3	−2	6
Shawn Matthias	27	1	2	3	−1	10
Nic Petan	15	2	0	2	0	6
Tucker Poolman	24	1	1	2	2	0
Sami Niku	1	1	0	1	0	0
Brendan Lemieux	9	1	0	1	2	21

Playoffs
Player	GP	G	A	Pts	+/−	PIM
Blake Wheeler	17	3	18	21	2	10
Mark Scheifele	17	14	6	20	6	10
Dustin Byfuglien	17	5	11	16	2	20
Paul Stastny	17	6	9	15	5	0
Patrik Laine	17	5	7	12	2	4
Kyle Connor	17	3	7	10	2	2
Tyler Myers	16	4	3	7	7	8
Nikolaj Ehlers	15	0	7	7	4	2
Brandon Tanev	17	4	2	6	−4	11
Bryan Little	17	1	5	6	5	2
Jacob Trouba	17	2	1	3	6	17
Andrew Copp	16	1	2	3	−1	4
Ben Chiarot	16	0	3	3	3	15
Jack Roslovic	10	0	3	3	4	2
Joel Armia	13	2	0	2	2	6
Josh Morrissey	16	1	1	2	2	6
Adam Lowry	17	0	2	2	−4	8
Mathieu Perreault	9	1	0	1	1	4
Joe Morrow	6	1	0	1	2	14
Dmitri Kulikov	1	0	0	0	−1	2
Tucker Poolman	2	0	0	0	1	0
Matt Hendricks	5	0	0	0	0	4
Tobias Enstrom	11	0	0	0	−2	2

Goaltenders

Regular season
Player	GP	GS	TOI	W	L	OT	GA	GAA	SA	SV%	SO	G	A	PIM
Connor Hellebuyck	67	64	3,965:54	44	11	9	156	2.36	2048	.924	6	0	2	0
Steve Mason	13	12	684:53	5	6	1	37	3.24	392	.906	1	0	1	0
Michael Hutchinson	3	3	128:45	2	1	0	7	3.26	75	.907	0	0	1	0
Eric Comrie	3	3	180:26	1	2	0	12	3.99	94	.872	0	0	0	0

Playoffs
Player	GP	GS	TOI	W	L	GA	GAA	SA	SV%	SO	G	A	PIM
Connor Hellebuyck	17	17	1,015:07	9	8	40	2.36	511	.922	2	0	0	2
Steve Mason	1	0	20:00	0	0	0	0.00	7	1.000	0	0	0	0

^{†}Denotes player spent time with another team before joining the Jets. Statistics reflect time with the Jets only.
^{‡}Denotes player was traded mid-season. Statistics reflect time with the Jets only.
Bold/italics denotes franchise record.

== Transactions ==
The Jets have been involved in the following transactions during the 2017–18 season.

=== Trades ===
Date	Details		Ref
June 21, 2017	To Vegas Golden Knights 1st-round pick in 2017; 3rd-round pick in 2019	To Winnipeg Jets CBJ's 1st-round pick in 2017; Expansion Draft considerations^{[a]}
February 26, 2018	To St. Louis Blues Erik Foley; Conditional 1st-round pick in 2018; Conditional 4th-round pick in 2020	To Winnipeg Jets Paul Stastny
February 26, 2018	To Montreal Canadiens 4th-round pick in 2018	To Winnipeg Jets Joe Morrow

Notes:

- ^{[a]} The Vegas Golden Knights selected Chris Thorburn in the 2017 NHL expansion draft.

=== Free agents acquired ===
Date	Player	Former team	Contract terms (in U.S. dollars)	Ref
July 1, 2017	Steve Mason	Philadelphia Flyers	2-year, $8.2 million	
July 1, 2017	Dmitri Kulikov	Buffalo Sabres	3-year, $12.99 million	
July 1, 2017	Michael Sgarbossa	Florida Panthers	1-year, $650,000	
July 1, 2017	Buddy Robinson	San Jose Sharks	1-year, $650,000	
July 1, 2017	Cameron Schilling	Los Angeles Kings	1-year, $650,000	
August 27, 2017	Matt Hendricks	Edmonton Oilers	1-year, $700,000	

=== Free agents lost ===
Date	Player	New team	Contract terms (in U.S. dollars)	Ref
July 1, 2017	Paul Postma	Boston Bruins	1-year, $725,000	
July 1, 2017	Brenden Kichton	Carolina Hurricanes	1-year, $700,000	
July 1, 2017	Brian Strait	New Jersey Devils	1-year, $650,000	
July 1, 2017	Ondrej Pavelec	New York Rangers	1-year, $1.3 million	
July 1, 2017	Anthony Peluso	Washington Capitals	1-year, $650,000	
August 18, 2017	Quinton Howden	Dinamo Minsk	1-year	
September 13, 2017	Scott Kosmachuk	Hartford Wolf Pack	Unknown	
October 11, 2017	Mark Stuart	Adler Mannheim	1-year	

=== Claimed via waivers ===
Player	Previous team	Date	Ref

=== Lost via waivers ===
Player	New team	Date	Ref

=== Lost via retirement ===
Date	Player	Ref

=== Player signings ===
Date	Player	Contract terms (in U.S. dollars)	Ref
June 24, 2017	Ben Chiarot	2-year, $2.8 million	
July 10, 2017	Brandon Tanev	1-year, $700,000	
July 12, 2017	Andrew Copp	2-year, $2 million	
July 13, 2017	Mason Appleton	3-year, $2.275 million entry-level contract	
July 17, 2017	JC Lipon	1-year, $650,000	
July 24, 2017	Connor Hellebuyck	1-year, $2.25 million	
September 14, 2017	Bryan Little	6-year, $31.746 million contract extension	
September 25, 2017	Luke Green	3-year, $2.54 million entry-level contract	
October 4, 2017	Nikolaj Ehlers	7-year, $42 million	
March 25, 2018	C. J. Suess	1-year, $925,000 entry-level contract	
May 19, 2018	Mikhail Berdin	3-year, entry-level contract	

== Draft picks ==
Below are the Winnipeg Jets' selections at the 2017 NHL entry draft, which was held on June 23 and 24, 2017 at the United Center in Chicago.

Round	#	Player	Pos	Nationality	College/Junior/Club team (League)
1	24^{1}	Kristian Vesalainen	LW	Finland	Frölunda HC (SHL)
2	43	Dylan Samberg	D	United States	Hermantown High School (USHS)
3	74	Johnny Kovacevic	D	Canada	Merrimack College (Hockey East)
4	105	Santeri Virtanen	C	Finland	TPS U20 (Jr. A SM-liiga)
5	136	Leon Gawanke	D	Germany	Cape Breton Screaming Eagles (QMJHL)
6	167	Arvid Holm	G	Sweden	Karlskrona HK (J20 SuperElit)
7	198	Skyler McKenzie	C	Canada	Portland Winterhawks (WHL)
7	211^{2}	Croix Evingson	D	United States	Shreveport Mudbugs (NAHL)

Draft notes:

1. The Columbus Blue Jackets' first-round pick went to the Winnipeg Jets as the result of a trade on June 21, 2017, that sent a first-round pick in 2017, a third-round pick in 2019 to Vegas and ensured that Vegas selected Chris Thorburn in the 2017 NHL expansion draft from Winnipeg in exchange for this pick.
2. The Montreal Canadiens' seventh-round pick went to the Winnipeg Jets as the result of a trade on June 25, 2016 that sent a seventh-round pick in 2016 to Montreal in exchange for this pick.
