= 2017–18 Anaheim Ducks season =

NHL team season

2017–18 Anaheim Ducks
- Division: 2nd Pacific
- Conference: 5th Western
- 2017–18 record: 44–25–13
- Home record: 26–10–5
- Road record: 18–15–8
- Goals for: 235
- Goals against: 216

Team information
- General manager: Bob Murray
- Coach: Randy Carlyle
- Captain: Ryan Getzlaf
- Alternate captains: Ryan Kesler; Corey Perry
- Arena: Honda Center
- Average attendance: 16,635
- Minor league affiliates: San Diego Gulls (AHL); Utah Grizzlies (ECHL)

Team leaders
- Goals: Rickard Rakell (34)
- Assists: Ryan Getzlaf (50)
- Points: Rickard Rakell (69)
- Penalty minutes: Kevin Bieksa (83)
- Plus/minus: Josh Manson (+34)
- Wins: John Gibson (31)
- Goals against average: Reto Berra (2.31)

The 2017–18 Anaheim Ducks season was the 25th season for the National Hockey League (NHL) franchise that was established on June 15, 1993. For the first time since the 2011–12 season, the Ducks failed to win the Pacific Division; snapping a 5-year streak. They later advanced to the playoffs, but were swept by the San Jose Sharks in the first round. Until 2026, this was the last time the Ducks made the playoffs.

== Standings ==
Pacific Division
Pos	Team	GP	W	L	OTL	ROW	GF	GA	GD	Pts
1	y – Vegas Golden Knights	82	51	24	7	47	272	228	+44	109
2	x – Anaheim Ducks	82	44	25	13	40	235	216	+19	101
3	x – San Jose Sharks	82	45	27	10	40	252	229	+23	100
4	x – Los Angeles Kings	82	45	29	8	43	239	203	+36	98
5	Calgary Flames	82	37	35	10	35	218	248	−30	84
6	Edmonton Oilers	82	36	40	6	31	234	263	−29	78
7	Vancouver Canucks	82	31	40	11	31	218	264	−46	73
8	Arizona Coyotes	82	29	41	12	27	208	256	−48	70

Source: National Hockey League
x – Clinched playoff spot; y – Clinched division

== Schedule and results ==
=== Preseason ===
The preseason schedule was released on June 15, 2017.

2017 preseason game log: 3–3–1 (Home: 2–2–0; Road: 1–1–1)
#	Date	Visitor	Score	Home	OT	Decision	Attendance	Record	Recap
1	September 19	Anaheim	0–5	San Jose		Berra	15,032	0–1–0	L1
2	September 20	Arizona	5–1	Anaheim		Boyle	13,447	0–2–0	L2
3	September 22	Los Angeles	2–4	Anaheim		Miller	15,393	1–2–0	W1
4	September 24	Vegas	4–2	Anaheim		Gibson	15,442	1–3–0	L1
5^{[a]}	September 25	Anaheim	6–4	Arizona		—	—	2–3–0	W1
6	September 28	San Jose	0–3	Anaheim		Berra	15,439	3–3–0	W2
7	September 30	Anaheim	0–1	Los Angeles	OT	Gibson	17,237	3–3–1	O1
Notes:^{a} Game was played at Tucson Arena in Tucson, Arizona.

=== Regular season ===
The regular season schedule was released on June 22, 2017.

2017–18 game log

October: 6–4–1 (Home: 3–2–1; Road: 3–2–0)
#	Date	Visitor	Score	Home	OT	Decision	Attendance	Record	Pts	Recap
1	October 5	Arizona	4–5	Anaheim		Gibson	17,174	1–0–0	2	W1
2	October 7	Philadelphia	3–2	Anaheim	OT	Gibson	16,032	1–0–1	3	O1
3	October 9	Calgary	2–0	Anaheim		Gibson	15,485	1–1–1	3	L1
4	October 11	NY Islanders	2–3	Anaheim		Gibson	14,553	2–1–1	5	W1
5	October 13	Anaheim	1–3	Colorado		Berra	15,393	2–2–1	5	L1
6	October 15	Buffalo	3–1	Anaheim		Gibson	15.821	2–3–1	5	L2
7	October 20	Montreal	2–6	Anaheim		Gibson	17,174	3–3–1	7	W1
8	October 24	Anaheim	2–6	Philadelphia		Gibson	18,895	4–3–1	9	W2
9	October 26	Anaheim	3–8	Florida		Gibson	10,545	4–4–1	9	L1
10	October 28	Anaheim	4–1	Tampa Bay		Gibson	19,092	5–4–1	11	W1
11	October 29	Anaheim	4–3	Carolina	SO	Miller	10,108	6–4–1	13	W2

November: 5–6–3 (Home: 3–5–1; Road: 2–1–2)
#	Date	Visitor	Score	Home	OT	Decision	Attendance	Record	Pts	Recap
12	November 1	Toronto	3–1	Anaheim		Gibson	15,628	6–5–1	13	L1
13	November 3	Nashville	5–3	Anaheim		Gibson	15,523	6–6–1	13	L2
14	November 4	Anaheim	1–2	San Jose	SO	Miller	17,562	6–6–2	14	O1
15	November 7	Los Angeles	4–3	Anaheim	OT	Miller	16,637	6–6–3	15	O2
16	November 9	Vancouver	1–4	Anaheim		Miller	16,038	7–6–3	17	W1
17	November 12	Tampa Bay	2–1	Anaheim		Gibson	15,707	7–7–3	17	L1
18	November 15	Boston	2–4	Anaheim		Gibson	15,089	8–7–3	19	W1
19	November 19	Florida	2–3	Anaheim		Gibson	17,174	9–7–3	21	W2
20	November 20	Anaheim	3–2	San Jose	SO	Berra	17,257	10–7–3	23	W3
21	November 22	Vegas	4–2	Anaheim		Gibson	17,174	10–8–3	23	L1
22	November 24	Winnipeg	4–1	Anaheim		Gibson	16,035	10–9–3	23	L2
23	November 25	Anaheim	1–2	Los Angeles	SO	Miller	18,230	10–9–4	24	O1
24	November 27	Anaheim	3–7	Chicago		Gibson	21,619	10–10–4	24	L1
25	November 29	Anaheim	3–2	St. Louis		Gibson	16,760	11–10–4	26	W1

December: 7–4–4 (Home: 4–1–1; Road: 3–3–3)
#	Date	Visitor	Score	Home	OT	Decision	Attendance	Record	Pts	Recap
26	December 1	Anaheim	2–4	Columbus		Gibson	16,206	11–11–4	26	L1
27	December 2	Anaheim	2–3	Nashville	SO	Miller	17,113	11–11–5	27	O1
28	December 5	Anaheim	3–4	Vegas	SO	Gibson	17,608	11–11–6	28	O2
29	December 6	Ottawa	0–3	Anaheim		Miller	15,890	12–11–6	30	W1
30	December 8	Minnesota	3–2	Anaheim	OT	Gibson	16,471	12–11–7	31	O1
31	December 11	Carolina	2–3	Anaheim		Gibson	16,198	13–11–7	33	W1
32	December 14	Anaheim	3–1	St. Louis		Gibson	17,822	14–11–7	35	W2
33	December 16	Anaheim	2–3	Washington	OT	Gibson	18,506	14–11–8	36	O1
34	December 18	Anaheim	3–5	New Jersey		Miller	16,514	14–12–8	36	L1
35	December 19	Anaheim	1–4	NY Rangers		Gibson	18,006	14–13–8	36	L2
36	December 21	Anaheim	5–4	NY Islanders	OT	Miller	10,092	15–13–8	38	W1
37	December 23	Anaheim	4–0	Pittsburgh		Gibson	18,622	16–13–8	40	W2
38	December 27	Vegas	4–1	Anaheim		Gibson	17,444	16–14–8	40	L1
39	December 29	Calgary	1–2	Anaheim		Gibson	17,174	17–14–8	42	W1
40	December 31	Arizona	2–5	Anaheim		Gibson	17,174	18–14–8	44	W2

January: 7–3–1 (Home: 4–1–0; Road: 3–2–1)
#	Date	Visitor	Score	Home	OT	Decision	Attendance	Record	Pts	Recap
41	January 2	Anaheim	5–0	Vancouver		Miller	18,865	19–14–8	46	W3
42	January 4	Anaheim	1–2	Edmonton	SO	Gibson	18,347	19–14–9	47	O1
43	January 6	Anaheim	2–3	Calgary		Gibson	19,258	19–15–9	47	L1
44	January 13	Anaheim	4–2	Los Angeles		Gibson	18,443	20–15–9	49	W1
45	January 15	Anaheim	1–3	Colorado		Miller	16,090	20–16–9	49	L1
46	January 17	Pittsburgh	3–5	Anaheim		Gibson	17,291	21–16–9	51	W1
47	January 19	Los Angeles	1–2	Anaheim		Gibson	17,258	22–16–9	53	W2
48	January 21	San Jose	6–2	Anaheim		Gibson	17,347	22–17–9	53	L1
49	January 23	NY Rangers	3–6	Anaheim		Gibson	16,763	23–17–9	55	W1
50	January 25	Winnipeg	3–4	Anaheim	SO	Miller	17,174	24–17–9	57	W2
51	January 30	Anaheim	3–1	Boston		Gibson	17,565	25–17–9	59	W3

February: 6–4–3 (Home: 2–0–2; Road: 4–4–1)
#	Date	Visitor	Score	Home	OT	Decision	Attendance	Record	Pts	Recap
52	February 1	Anaheim	1–2	Ottawa	OT	Miller	13,759	25–17–10	60	O1
53	February 3	Anaheim	2–5	Montreal		Miller	21,302	25–18–10	60	L1
54	February 5	Anaheim	4–7	Toronto		Miller	19,055	25–19–10	60	L2
55	February 6	Anaheim	4–3	Buffalo	OT	Miller	16,788	26–19–10	62	W1
56	February 9	Edmonton	2–3	Anaheim		Gibson	17,174	27–19–10	64	W2
57	February 11	San Jose	3–2	Anaheim	SO	Gibson	17,435	27–19–11	65	O1
58	February 13	Anaheim	1–2	Detroit		Gibson	19,515	27–20–11	65	L1
59	February 15	Anaheim	3–2	Chicago		Gibson	21,415	28–20–11	67	W1
60	February 17	Anaheim	3–2	Minnesota	SO	Gibson	19,192	29–20–11	69	W2
61	February 19	Anaheim	2–0	Vegas		Gibson	18,267	30–20–11	71	W3
62	February 21	Dallas	0–2	Anaheim		Miller	16,609	31–20–11	73	W4
63	February 24	Anaheim	0–2	Arizona		Miller	11,959	31–21–11	73	L1
64	February 25	Edmonton	6–5	Anaheim	SO	Miller	17,174	31–21–12	74	O1

March: 9–4–1 (Home: 7–1–0; Road: 2–3–1)
#	Date	Visitor	Score	Home	OT	Decision	Attendance	Record	Pts	Recap
65	March 2	Columbus	2–4	Anaheim		Gibson	16,447	32–21–12	76	W1
66	March 4	Chicago	3–6	Anaheim		Gibson	16,989	33–21–12	78	W2
67	March 6	Washington	0–4	Anaheim		Gibson	15,910	34–21–12	80	W3
68	March 8	Anaheim	2–4	Nashville		Gibson	17,475	34–22–12	80	L1
69	March 9	Anaheim	1–2	Dallas		Miller	18,532	34–23–12	80	L2
70	March 12	St. Louis	4–2	Anaheim		Gibson	16,312	34–24–12	80	L3
71	March 14	Vancouver	0–3	Anaheim		Gibson	16,561	35–24–12	82	W1
72	March 16	Detroit	2–4	Anaheim		Gibson	17,243	36–24–12	84	W2
73	March 18	New Jersey	2–4	Anaheim		Gibson	16,401	37–24–12	86	W3
74	March 21	Anaheim	4–0	Calgary		Gibson	19,059	38–24–12	88	W4
75	March 23	Anaheim	2–3	Winnipeg	OT	Gibson	15,321	38–24–13	89	O1
76	March 25	Anaheim	5–4	Edmonton	OT	Gibson	18,347	39–24–13	91	W1
77	March 27	Anaheim	1–4	Vancouver		Gibson	18,405	39–25–13	91	L1
78	March 30	Los Angeles	1–2	Anaheim	OT	Gibson	17,473	40–25–13	93	W1

April: 4–0–0 (Home: 3–0–0; Road: 1–0–0)
#	Date	Visitor	Score	Home	OT	Decision	Attendance	Record	Pts	Recap
79	April 1	Colorado	3–4	Anaheim	OT	Miller	17,054	41–25–13	95	W2
80	April 4	Minnesota	1–3	Anaheim		Miller	17,495	42–25–13	97	W3
81	April 6	Dallas	3–5	Anaheim		Miller	17,355	43–25–13	99	W4
82	April 7	Anaheim	3–0	Arizona		Miller	17,382	44–25–13	101	W5

Legend: Win (2 points) Loss (0 points) Overtime/shootout loss (1 point)

=== Playoffs ===
2018 Stanley Cup playoffs

Western Conference First Round vs. (P3) San Jose Sharks: San Jose won 4–0
#	Date	Visitor	Score	Home	OT	Decision	Attendance	Series	Recap
1	April 12	San Jose	3–0	Anaheim		Gibson	17,174	0–1	Recap
2	April 14	San Jose	3–2	Anaheim		Gibson	17,430	0–2	Recap
3	April 16	Anaheim	1–8	San Jose		Gibson	17,562	0–3	Recap
4	April 18	Anaheim	1–2	San Jose		Gibson	17,562	0–4	Recap

Legend: Win Loss

== Player statistics ==
Final stats

=== Skaters ===
Regular season
Player	GP	G	A	Pts	+/−	PIM
Rickard Rakell	77	34	35	69	6	14
Ryan Getzlaf	56	11	50	61	20	42
Corey Perry	71	17	32	49	−4	71
Jakob Silfverberg	77	17	23	40	6	18
Ondrej Kase	66	20	18	38	18	14
Josh Manson	80	7	30	37	34	62
Adam Henrique^{†}	57	20	16	36	17	14
Andrew Cogliano	80	12	23	35	18	41
Brandon Montour	80	9	23	32	16	42
Cam Fowler	67	8	24	32	3	28
Hampus Lindholm	69	13	18	31	16	34
Nick Ritchie	76	10	17	27	3	72
Derek Grant	66	12	12	24	3	11
Francois Beauchemin	67	3	14	17	12	26
Antoine Vermette	64	8	8	16	−5	34
Chris Wagner^{‡}	64	6	9	15	−7	35
Ryan Kesler	44	8	6	14	−4	46
Logan Shaw^{‡}	42	2	6	8	−1	4
Kevin Bieksa	59	0	8	8	−13	83
Kevin Roy	25	6	1	7	3	6
Marcus Pettersson	22	1	3	4	5	6
Sami Vatanen^{‡}	15	1	3	4	−6	8
Dennis Rasmussen	27	1	3	4	4	8
J. T. Brown^{†}	23	1	2	3	−4	12
Kalle Kossila	10	1	1	2	−4	0
Jason Chimera^{†}	16	1	1	2	−1	2
Andy Welinski	7	0	2	2	−1	0
Chris Kelly	12	0	2	2	1	2
Jared Boll	10	1	0	1	0	16
Patrick Eaves	2	1	0	1	0	0
Jaycob Megna	14	0	1	1	−4	2
Michael Liambas	7	0	1	1	0	21
Troy Terry	2	0	0	0	0	0
Korbinian Holzer	16	0	0	0	−3	6
Giovanni Fiore	1	0	0	0	−1	0
Nicolas Kerdiles	2	0	0	0	0	0
Joseph Blandisi^{†}	3	0	0	0	2	2

Playoffs
Player	GP	G	A	Pts	+/−	PIM
Jakob Silfverberg	4	1	1	2	1	2
Hampus Lindholm	4	1	1	2	−3	2
Ryan Getzlaf	4	0	2	2	−4	18
Ryan Kesler	4	0	2	2	0	6
Rickard Rakell	4	1	0	1	−4	0
Andrew Cogliano	4	1	0	1	1	2
Brandon Montour	4	0	1	1	−2	6
Corey Perry	4	0	0	0	−5	8
Marcus Pettersson	4	0	0	0	−4	2
Ondrej Kase	4	0	0	0	−2	0
Josh Manson	4	0	0	0	−1	2
Francois Beauchemin	4	0	0	0	−3	2
J. T. Brown	4	0	0	0	−2	0
Derek Grant	4	0	0	0	−2	0
Adam Henrique	4	0	0	0	−2	0
Antoine Vermette	2	0	0	0	−1	0
Andy Welinski	3	0	0	0	−2	0
Kevin Bieksa	1	0	0	0	−1	0
Jason Chimera	2	0	0	0	−2	0
Nick Ritchie	4	0	0	0	−2	8

=== Goaltenders ===
Final stats

Regular season
Player	GP	GS	TOI	W	L	OT	GA	GAA	SA	SV%	SO	G	A	PIM
John Gibson	60	60	3,428:29	31	18	7	139	2.43	1,872	.926	4	0	1	16
Ryan Miller	28	21	1,353:16	12	6	6	53	2.35	739	.928	4	0	0	0
Reto Berra	5	1	181:57	1	1	0	7	2.31	95	.926	0	0	0	0

Playoffs
Player	GP	GS	TOI	W	L	GA	GAA	SA	SV%	SO	G	A	PIM
John Gibson	4	4	216:31	0	4	13	3.60	117	.889	0	0	0	0
Ryan Miller	1	0	20:00	0	0	3	9.00	12	.750	0	0	0	0

^{†}Denotes player spent time with another team before joining the Ducks. Stats reflect time with the Ducks only.
^{‡}Denotes player was traded mid-season. Stats reflect time with the Ducks only.

== Transactions ==
The Ducks have been involved in the following transactions during the 2017–18 season.

=== Trades ===
Date	Details		Ref
June 21, 2017	To Vegas Golden Knights Shea Theodore	To Anaheim Ducks Expansion Draft considerations^{1}
October 9, 2017	To Philadelphia Flyers Dustin Tokarski	To Anaheim Ducks Future considerations
November 30, 2017	To New Jersey Devils Sami Vatanen; Conditional 3rd-round pick in 2019 or 2020	To Anaheim Ducks season Joseph Blandisi; Adam Henrique; NJD's 3rd-round pick in 2018
February 26, 2018	To New York Islanders Chris Wagner	To Anaheim Ducks Jason Chimera

==== Notes ====
1. This trade ensured that the Vegas Golden Knights would select Clayton Stoner in the 2017 NHL expansion draft.

=== Free agents acquired ===
Date	Player	Former team	Contract terms (in U.S. dollars)	Ref
July 1, 2017	Ryan Miller	Vancouver Canucks	2-year, $4 million	
July 2, 2017	Derek Grant	Buffalo Sabres	1-year, $650,000	
July 2, 2017	Mike Liambas	Nashville Predators	1-year, $650,000	
July 2, 2017	Steven Oleksy	Toronto Maple Leafs	2-year, $1.3 million	
July 2, 2017	Scott Sabourin	San Diego Gulls	1-year, $650,000	
July 5, 2017	Reto Berra	Fribourg-Gottéron	1-year, $700,000	
July 7, 2017	Dennis Rasmussen	Chicago Blackhawks	1-year, $725,000	
August 21, 2017	Francois Beauchemin	Colorado Avalanche	1-year, $1 million	
March 20, 2018	Kiefer Sherwood	Miami RedHawks	2-year, $1.85 million entry-level contract	

=== Free agents lost ===
Date	Player	New team	Contract terms (in U.S. dollars)	Ref
May 23, 2017	Nick Sorensen	Linköpings HC	2-year	
May 26, 2016	Max Gortz	Malmö Redhawks	2-year	
July 1, 2017	Jonathan Bernier	Colorado Avalanche	1-year, $2.75 million	
July 1, 2017	Nate Thompson	Ottawa Senators	2-year, $3.3 million	
July 5, 2017	Emerson Etem	Arizona Coyotes	1-year, $850,000	
July 13, 2017	Jhonas Enroth	Dinamo Minsk	1-year	
August 24, 2017	Simon Despres	Slovan Bratislava	1-year	
September 5, 2017	Matt Hackett	Orlando Solar Bears	1-year	
May 1, 2018	Reto Berra	HC Fribourg-Gotteron	1-year	

=== Claimed via waivers ===
Player	Previous team	Date	Ref
J. T. Brown	Tampa Bay Lightning	January 14, 2018	

=== Lost via waivers ===
Player	New team	Date	Ref
Logan Shaw	Montreal Canadiens	January 15, 2018	

=== Players released ===
Date	Player	Via	Ref
February 13, 2018	Dennis Rasmussen	Contract termination	

=== Lost via retirement ===
Date	Player	Ref

=== Player signings ===
Date	Player	Contract terms (in U.S. dollars)	Ref
June 23, 2017	Patrick Eaves	3-year, $9.45 million	
June 25, 2017	Korbinian Holzer	2-year, $1.8 million	
June 28, 2017	Kevin Boyle	1-year, $675,000	
June 28, 2017	Jaycob Megna	2-year, $1.3 million	
July 1, 2017	Cam Fowler	8-year, $52 million contract extension	
July 8, 2017	Alex Dostie	3-year, $2.775 million entry-level contract	
October 4, 2017	Josh Manson	4-year, $16.4 million contract extension	
January 12, 2018	Andrew Cogliano	3-year, $9.75 million contract extension	
March 3, 2018	Max Comtois	3-year, $2.775 million entry-level contract	
April 7, 2018	Troy Terry	3-year, $4.475 million entry-level contract	
April 7, 2018	Olle Eriksson Ek	3-year, $2.6225 entry-level contract	
May 29, 2018	Antoine Morand	3-year, $2.775 entry-level contract	
June 18, 2018	Kevin Boyle	2-year, $1.35 million contract extension	

== Draft picks ==
Below are the Anaheim Ducks' selections at the 2017 NHL entry draft, which was held on June 23 and 24, 2017 at the United Center in Chicago.

Round	#	Player	Pos	Nationality	College/Junior/Club team (League)
2	50^{1}	Max Comtois	C	Canada	Victoriaville Tigres (QMJHL)
2	60	Antoine Morand	C	Canada	Acadie–Bathurst Titan (QMJHL)
3	91	Jack Badini	C	United States	Chicago Steel (USHL)
4	122	Kyle Olson	C	Canada	Tri-City Americans (WHL)
5	153	Olle Eriksson Ek	G	Sweden	Färjestad BK (J20 SuperElit)

=== Notes ===
1. The San Jose Sharks' second-round pick went to the Anaheim Ducks as the result of a trade on June 20, 2016, that sent Frederik Andersen to Toronto in exchange for Pittsburgh's first-round pick in 2016 and this pick (being conditional at the time of the trade). The condition – Anaheim will receive the middle pick of Ottawa, San Jose or Toronto's second-round picks in 2017. – was converted on May 9, 2017, when Ottawa advanced to the 2017 Eastern Conference Final, ensuring the Sharks' second-round pick would be higher than the Senators' and lower than the Maple Leafs'.
