= 2017–18 Minnesota Wild season =

National Hockey League team season

2017–18 Minnesota Wild
- Division: 3rd Central
- Conference: 4th Western
- 2017–18 record: 45–26–11
- Home record: 27–6–8
- Road record: 18–20–3
- Goals for: 253
- Goals against: 232

Team information
- General manager: Chuck Fletcher
- Coach: Bruce Boudreau
- Captain: Mikko Koivu
- Alternate captains: Zach Parise; Ryan Suter
- Arena: Xcel Energy Center
- Average attendance: 19,036
- Minor league affiliates: Iowa Wild (AHL); Rapid City Rush (ECHL)

Team leaders
- Goals: Eric Staal (42)
- Assists: Mikael Granlund (46)
- Points: Eric Staal (76)
- Penalty minutes: Marcus Foligno (72)
- Plus/minus: Jonas Brodin (+23)
- Wins: Devan Dubnyk (35)
- Goals against average: Devan Dubnyk (2.52)

The 2017–18 Minnesota Wild season was the 18th season for the National Hockey League (NHL) franchise that was established on June 25, 1997.

== Standings ==
Central Division
Pos	Team	GP	W	L	OTL	ROW	GF	GA	GD	Pts
1	p – Nashville Predators	82	53	18	11	47	267	211	+56	117
2	x – Winnipeg Jets	82	52	20	10	48	277	218	+59	114
3	x – Minnesota Wild	82	45	26	11	42	253	232	+21	101
4	x – Colorado Avalanche	82	43	30	9	41	257	237	+20	95
5	St. Louis Blues	82	44	32	6	41	226	222	+4	94
6	Dallas Stars	82	42	32	8	38	235	225	+10	92
7	Chicago Blackhawks	82	33	39	10	32	229	256	−27	76

Source: National Hockey League
p – Clinched Presidents' Trophy; x – Clinched playoff spot

== Schedule and results ==
=== Preseason ===
The team's preseason schedule was released on June 13, 2017.

2017 preseason game log: 5–2–0 (Home: 3–0–0; Road: 2–2–0)
#	Date	Visitor	Score	Home	OT	Decision	Attendance	Record	Recap
1	September 18	Minnesota	3–2	Winnipeg	SO	Michalek	15,294	1–0–0	Recap
2	September 21	Winnipeg	0–1	Minnesota		Stalock	16,518	2–0–0	Recap
3	September 23	Colorado	1–2	Minnesota		Dubnyk	18,754	3–0–0	Recap
4	September 24	Minnesota	1–5	Colorado		Michalek	—	3–1–0	Recap
5	September 26	Minnesota	1–4	Dallas		Stalock	11,373	3–2–0	Recap
6^{[a]}	September 28	Minnesota	3–2	St. Louis		—	—	4–2–0	Recap
7	September 30	Dallas	1–5	Minnesota		Dubnyk	18,374	5–2–0	Recap
Notes:^{a} Game was played at Sprint Center in Kansas City, Missouri.

=== Regular season ===
The regular season schedule was published on June 22, 2017.

2017–18 game log

October: 4–4–2 (Home: 2–2–1; Road: 2–2–1)
#	Date	Visitor	Score	Home	OT	Decision	Attendance	Record	Pts	Recap
1	October 5	Minnesota	2–4	Detroit		Dubnyk	19,515	0–1–0	0	Recap
2	October 7	Minnesota	4–5	Carolina	SO	Stalock	18,680	0–1–1	1	Recap
3	October 12	Minnesota	5–2	Chicago		Dubnyk	21,386	1–1–1	3	Recap
4	October 14	Columbus	5–4	Minnesota	OT	Dubnyk	19,064	1–1–2	4	Recap
5	October 20	Minnesota	3–4	Winnipeg		Dubnyk	15,321	1–2–2	4	Recap
6	October 21	Minnesota	4–2	Calgary		Stalock	18,436	2–2–2	6	Recap
7	October 24	Vancouver	1–0	Minnesota		Dubnyk	18,694	2–3–2	6	Recap
8	October 26	NY Islanders	4–6	Minnesota		Dubnyk	18,824	3–3–2	8	Recap
9	October 28	Pittsburgh	1–2	Minnesota		Dubnyk	19,064	4–3–2	10	Recap
10	October 31	Winnipeg	2–1	Minnesota		Stalock	18,814	4–4–2	10	Recap

November: 8–6–1 (Home: 5–1–1; Road: 3–5–0)
#	Date	Visitor	Score	Home	OT	Decision	Attendance	Record	Pts	Recap
11	November 2	Montreal	3–6	Minnesota		Dubnyk	18,924	5–4–2	12	Recap
12	November 4	Chicago	2–0	Minnesota		Dubnyk	19,218	5–5–2	12	Recap
13	November 6	Minnesota	3–5	Boston		Dubnyk	17,565	5–6–2	12	Recap
14	November 8	Minnesota	2–4	Toronto		Dubnyk	19,049	5–7–2	12	Recap
15	November 9	Minnesota	3–0	Montreal		Dubnyk	21,302	6–7–2	14	Recap
16	November 11	Minnesota	1–0	Philadelphia		Dubnyk	19,309	7–7–2	16	Recap
17	November 14	Philadelphia	0–3	Minnesota		Dubnyk	18,768	8–7–2	18	Recap
18	November 16	Nashville	4–6	Minnesota		Dubnyk	18,888	9–7–2	20	Recap
19	November 18	Minnesota	1–3	Washington		Stalock	18,506	9–8–2	20	Recap
20	November 20	New Jersey	4–3	Minnesota	OT	Dubnyk	19,048	9–8–3	21	Recap
21	November 22	Minnesota	5–4	Buffalo		Dubnyk	17,418	10–8–3	23	Recap
22	November 24	Colorado	2–3	Minnesota	SO	Stalock	19,084	11–8–3	25	Recap
23	November 25	Minnesota	3–6	St. Louis		Dubnyk	18,610	11–9–3	25	Recap
24	November 27	Minnesota	2–7	Winnipeg		Stalock	15,321	11–10–3	25	Recap
25	November 30	Vegas	2–4	Minnesota		Dubnyk	19,084	12–10–3	27	Recap

December: 8–6–0 (Home: 5–1–0; Road: 3–5–0)
#	Date	Visitor	Score	Home	OT	Decision	Attendance	Record	Pts	Recap
26	December 2	St. Louis	1–2	Minnesota	OT	Dubnyk	19,107	13–10–3	29	Recap
27	December 5	Minnesota	2–5	Los Angeles		Dubnyk	18,230	13–11–3	29	Recap
28	December 8	Minnesota	3–2	Anaheim	OT	Dubnyk	16,471	14–11–3	31	Recap
29	December 10	Minnesota	4–3	San Jose	OT	Stalock	17,205	15–11–3	33	Recap
30	December 12	Calgary	1–2	Minnesota	SO	Stalock	18,767	16–11–3	35	Recap
31	December 14	Toronto	0–2	Minnesota		Stalock	18,857	17–11–3	37	Recap
32	December 16	Edmonton	3–2	Minnesota		Stalock	19,034	17–12–3	37	Recap
33	December 17	Minnesota	1–4	Chicago		Stalock	21,813	17–13–3	37	Recap
34	December 19	Minnesota	6–4	Ottawa		Stalock	13,804	18–13–3	39	Recap
35	December 22	Minnesota	2–4	Florida		Stalock	13,259	18–14–3	39	Recap
36	December 23	Minnesota	0–3	Tampa Bay		Stalock	19,092	18–15–3	39	Recap
37	December 27	Dallas	2–4	Minnesota		Stalock	19,107	19–15–3	41	Recap
38	December 29	Nashville	2–4	Minnesota		Dubnyk	19,147	20–15–3	43	Recap
39	December 30	Minnesota	0–3	Nashville		Stalock	17,459	20–16–3	43	Recap

January: 7–2–2 (Home: 5–0–2; Road: 2–2–0)
#	Date	Visitor	Score	Home	OT	Decision	Attendance	Record	Pts	Recap
40	January 2	Florida	1–5	Minnesota		Dubnyk	19,029	21–16–3	45	Recap
41	January 4	Buffalo	2–6	Minnesota		Dubnyk	19,017	22–16–3	47	Recap
42	January 6	Minnesota	2–7	Colorado		Dubnyk	18,046	22–17–3	47	Recap
43	January 9	Calgary	3–2	Minnesota	OT	Stalock	19,011	22–17–4	48	Recap
44	January 10	Minnesota	2–1	Chicago		Dubnyk	21,721	23–17–4	50	Recap
45	January 13	Winnipeg	1–4	Minnesota		Dubnyk	19,207	24–17–4	52	Recap
46	January 14	Vancouver	3–2	Minnesota	OT	Dubnyk	18,927	24–17–5	53	Recap
47	January 20	Tampa Bay	2–5	Minnesota		Dubnyk	19,007	25–17–5	55	Recap
48	January 22	Ottawa	1–3	Minnesota		Stalock	18,907	26–17–5	57	Recap
49	January 25	Minnesota	3–6	Pittsburgh		Dubnyk	18,453	26–18–5	57	Recap
50	January 30	Minnesota	3–2	Columbus	SO	Dubnyk	17,734	27–18–5	59	Recap

February: 9–2–2 (Home: 5–1–2; Road: 4–1–0)
#	Date	Visitor	Score	Home	OT	Decision	Attendance	Record	Pts	Recap
51	February 2	Vegas	2–5	Minnesota		Dubnyk	19,057	28–18–5	61	Recap
52	February 3	Minnesota	1–6	Dallas		Stalock	18,532	28–19–5	61	Recap
53	February 6	Minnesota	6–2	St. Louis		Dubnyk	17,821	29–19–5	63	Recap
54	February 8	Arizona	4–3	Minnesota	OT	Dubnyk	18,816	29–19–6	64	Recap
55	February 10	Chicago	0–3	Minnesota		Dubnyk	19,227	30–19–6	66	Recap
56	February 13	NY Rangers	2–3	Minnesota		Dubnyk	18,887	31–19–6	68	Recap
57	February 15	Washington	5–2	Minnesota		Dubnyk	19,027	31–20–6	68	Recap
58	February 17	Anaheim	3–2	Minnesota	SO	Dubnyk	19,192	31–20–7	69	Recap
59	February 19	Minnesota	5–3	NY Islanders		Dubnyk	15,342	32–20–7	71	Recap
60	February 22	Minnesota	4–2	New Jersey		Stalock	13,316	33–20–7	73	Recap
61	February 23	Minnesota	4–1	NY Rangers		Dubnyk	18,006	34–20–7	75	Recap
62	February 25	San Jose	2–3	Minnesota	OT	Dubnyk	19,105	35–20–7	77	Recap
63	February 27	St. Louis	3–8	Minnesota		Dubnyk	19,261	36–20–7	79	Recap

March: 7–5–3 (Home: 4–1–2; Road: 3–4–1)
#	Date	Visitor	Score	Home	OT	Decision	Attendance	Record	Pts	Recap
64	March 1	Minnesota	3–5	Arizona		Stalock	10,904	36–21–7	79	Recap
65	March 2	Minnesota	1–7	Colorado		Dubnyk	17,325	36–22–7	79	Recap
66	March 4	Detroit	1–4	Minnesota		Dubnyk	19,037	37–22–7	81	Recap
67	March 6	Carolina	2–6	Minnesota		Dubnyk	19,017	38–22–7	83	Recap
68	March 9	Minnesota	5–2	Vancouver		Dubnyk	17,918	39–22–7	85	Recap
69	March 10	Minnesota	1–4	Edmonton		Dubnyk	18,347	39–23–7	85	Recap
70	March 13	Colorado	5–1	Minnesota		Dubnyk	19,171	39–24–7	85	Recap
71	March 16	Minnesota	4–2	Vegas		Stalock	18,295	40–24–7	87	Recap
72	March 17	Minnesota	3–1	Arizona		Dubnyk	13,735	41–24–7	89	Recap
73	March 19	Los Angeles	4–3	Minnesota	OT	Dubnyk	19,081	41–24–8	90	Recap
74	March 24	Nashville	1–4	Minnesota		Dubnyk	19,303	42–24–8	92	Recap
75	March 25	Boston	2–1	Minnesota	OT	Stalock	19,183	42–24–9	93	Recap
76	March 27	Minnesota	1–2	Nashville	SO	Dubnyk	17,424	42–24–10	94	Recap
77	March 29	Dallas	2–5	Minnesota		Dubnyk	19,350	43–24–10	96	Recap
78	March 31	Minnesota	1–4	Dallas		Dubnyk	18,532	43–25–10	96	Recap

April: 2–1–1 (Home: 1–0–0; Road: 1–1–1)
#	Date	Visitor	Score	Home	OT	Decision	Attendance	Record	Pts	Recap
79	April 2	Edmonton	0–3	Minnesota		Dubnyk	19,189	44–25–10	98	Recap
80	April 4	Minnesota	1–3	Anaheim		Dubnyk	17,495	44–26–10	98	Recap
81	April 5	Minnesota	4–5	Los Angeles	OT	Stalock	18,230	44–26–11	99	Recap
82	April 7	Minnesota	6–3	San Jose		Dubnyk	17,562	45–26–11	101	Recap

Legend: Win (2 points) Loss (0 points) Overtime/shootout loss (1 point)

=== Playoffs ===
2018 Stanley Cup playoffs

Western Conference first round vs. (C2) Winnipeg Jets: Winnipeg won 4–1
#	Date	Visitor	Score	Home	OT	Decision	Attendance	Series	Recap
1	April 11	Minnesota	2–3	Winnipeg		Dubnyk	15,321	0–1	Recap
2	April 13	Minnesota	1–4	Winnipeg		Dubnyk	15,321	0–2	Recap
3	April 15	Winnipeg	2–6	Minnesota		Dubnyk	19,175	1–2	Recap
4	April 17	Winnipeg	2–0	Minnesota		Dubnyk	19,277	1–3	Recap
5	April 20	Minnesota	0–5	Winnipeg		Dubnyk	15,321	1–4	Recap

Legend: Win Loss

== Player statistics ==
As of April 21, 2018

Skaters

Regular season
Player	GP	G	A	Pts	+/−	PIM
Eric Staal	82	42	34	76	8	42
Mikael Granlund	77	21	46	67	13	18
Jason Zucker	82	33	31	64	8	44
Ryan Suter	78	6	45	51	−1	34
Mathew Dumba	82	14	36	50	15	41
Mikko Koivu	82	14	31	45	9	46
Charlie Coyle	66	11	26	37	8	18
Jared Spurgeon	61	9	28	37	−6	8
Nino Niederreiter	63	18	14	32	14	36
Zach Parise	42	15	9	24	0	14
Marcus Foligno	77	8	15	23	2	72
Daniel Winnik	81	6	17	23	5	27
Matt Cullen	79	11	11	22	−1	20
Tyler Ennis	73	8	14	22	−1	12
Jonas Brodin	73	6	15	21	23	30
Joel Eriksson Ek	75	6	10	16	2	22
Chris Stewart^{‡}	47	9	4	13	−1	27
Mike Reilly^{‡}	38	2	8	10	−6	18
Nate Prosser	56	3	6	9	8	19
Gustav Olofsson	41	0	8	8	0	14
Zack Mitchell	23	3	2	5	−2	4
Ryan Murphy	21	2	3	5	8	16
Luke Kunin	19	2	2	4	−3	13
Nick Seeler	22	0	4	4	10	21
Kyle Quincey	18	0	3	3	−4	28
Landon Ferraro	2	1	0	1	1	0
Kyle Rau	3	0	1	1	0	0
Jordan Greenway	6	0	1	1	0	0
Christoph Bertschy	1	0	0	0	1	4
Cal O'Reilly	1	0	0	0	0	0
Carson Soucy	3	0	0	0	−2	2
Justin Kloos	1	0	0	0	0	2

Playoffs
Player	GP	G	A	Pts	+/-	PIM
Mikko Koivu	5	0	4	4	−2	2
Zach Parise	3	3	0	3	0	2
Mikael Granlund	5	1	2	3	−1	0
Matt Cullen	5	1	1	2	−3	2
Eric Staal	5	1	1	2	−3	2
Matt Dumba	5	1	1	2	−4	4
Jordan Greenway	5	1	1	2	2	0
Nick Seeler	5	0	2	2	1	7
Jonas Brodin	5	0	2	2	−3	2
Marcus Foligno	5	1	0	1	−2	16
Daniel Winnik	5	0	1	1	0	5
Jared Spurgeon	5	0	1	1	−4	0
Nate Prosser	5	0	1	1	−1	14
Joel Eriksson Ek	5	0	1	1	0	0
Jason Zucker	5	0	0	0	−4	0
Charlie Coyle	5	0	0	0	−3	2
Nino Niederreiter	5	0	0	0	−4	0
Carson Soucy	4	0	0	0	−3	0
Kyle Rau	1	0	0	0	−1	0
Tyler Ennis	1	0	0	0	−1	0
Ryan Murphy	1	0	0	0	0	0

Goaltenders

Regular season
Player	GP	GS	TOI	W	L	OT	GA	GAA	SA	SV%	SO	G	A	PIM
Devan Dubnyk	60	59	3,450:19	35	16	7	145	2.52	1,769	.918	5	0	3	12
Alex Stalock	28	23	1,495:16	10	10	4	71	2.85	787	.910	1	0	0	0

Playoffs
Player	GP	GS	TOI	W	L	GA	GAA	SA	SV%	SO	G	A	PIM
Devan Dubnyk	5	5	247:56	1	4	14	3.39	152	.908	0	0	0	0
Alex Stalock	1	0	48:01	0	0	1	1.25	16	.938	0	0	0	0

== Awards and honours ==
=== Awards ===
Regular season
Player	Award	Awarded
E. Staal	NHL All-Star game selection	January 10, 2018
E. Staal	NHL First Star of the Month	March 1, 2018

=== Milestones ===
Regular season
Player	Milestone	Reached
C. Stewart	600th career NHL game	October 7, 2017
L. Kunin	1st career NHL game	October 14, 2017
Z. Mitchell	1st career NHL assist 1st career NHL point	October 14, 2017
L. Kunin	1st career NHL assist 1st career NHL point	October 21, 2017
J. Kloos	1st career NHL game	October 24, 2017
L. Kunin	1st career NHL goal	October 26, 2017
Z. Mitchell	1st career NHL goal	October 26, 2017
T. Ennis	100th career NHL goal	November 2, 2017
E. Staal	500th career NHL assist	November 9, 2017
N. Niederreiter	400th career NHL game	November 14, 2017
M. Cullen	1,400th career NHL game	December 22, 2017
N. Prosser	300th career NHL game	January 6, 2018
M. Dumba	100th career NHL point	January 10, 2018
M. Cullen	700th career NHL point	January 20, 2018
J. Zucker	300th career NHL game	February 3, 2018
D. Dubnyk	400th career NHL game	February 8, 2018
C. Coyle	200th career NHL point	February 10, 2018
N. Seeler	1st career NHL game	February 13, 2018
M. Foligno	400th career NHL game	February 13, 2018
M. Koivu	900th career NHL game	February 15, 2018
N. Niederreiter	100th career NHL goal	February 15, 2018
N. Seeler	1st career NHL assist 1st career NHL point	February 22, 2018
E. Staal	900th career NHL point	February 22, 2018
J. Spurgeon	500th career NHL game	February 23, 2018
J. Spurgeon	200th career NHL point	February 25, 2018
C. Coyle	400th career NHL game	February 27, 2018
N. Niederreiter	100th career NHL assist 200th career NHL point	March 4, 2018
M. Dumba	300th career NHL game	March 17, 2018
D. Dubnyk	200th career NHL win	March 17, 2018
B. Boudreau	500th career NHL win	March 24, 2018
J. Greenway	1st career NHL game	March 27, 2018
J. Brodin	400th career NHL game	March 31, 2018
J. Brodin	100th career NHL point	March 31, 2018
D. Dubnyk	400th career NHL start	April 2, 2018
L. Belpedio	1st career NHL game 1st career NHL assist 1st career NHL point	April 7, 2018
J. Greenway	1st career NHL assist 1st career NHL point	April 7, 2018

Playoffs
Player	Milestone	Reached
M. Foligno	1st career playoff game	April 11, 2018
J. Greenway	1st career playoff game 1st career playoff assist 1st career playoff point	April 11, 2018
N. Seeler	1st career playoff game	April 11, 2018
C. Soucy	1st career playoff game	April 11, 2018
J. Greenway	1st career playoff goal	April 15, 2018
J. Eriksson Ek	1st career playoff assist 1st career playoff point	April 15, 2018
N. Seeler	1st career playoff assist 1st career playoff point	April 15, 2018
M. Foligno	1st career playoff goal 1st career playoff point	April 15, 2018
K. Rau	1st career playoff game	April 20, 2018
R. Murphy	1st career playoff game	April 20, 2018

== Transactions ==
The Wild have been involved in the following transactions during the 2017–18 season.

=== Trades ===
Date	Details		Ref
June 21, 2017	To Vegas Golden Knights Alex Tuch	To Minnesota Wild conditional 3rd-round pick in 2017 or 2018; Expansion Draft considerations^{[a]}
June 23, 2017	To Columbus Blue Jackets Jordan Schroeder	To Minnesota Wild Dante Salituro
June 30, 2017	To Buffalo Sabres Jason Pominville; Marco Scandella; 4th-round pick in 2018	To Minnesota Wild Tyler Ennis; Marcus Foligno; 3rd-round pick in 2018
February 8, 2018	To New Jersey Devils Christoph Bertschy; Mario Lucia	To Minnesota Wild Viktor Loov
February 26, 2018	To Montreal Canadiens Mike Reilly	To Minnesota Wild 5th-round pick in 2019

Notes

- ^{[a]} The Vegas Golden Knights will select Erik Haula in the 2017 NHL expansion draft

=== Free agents acquired ===
Date	Player	Former team	Contract terms (in U.S. dollars)	Ref
July 1, 2017	Landon Ferraro	St. Louis Blues	2-year, $1.4 million	
July 1, 2017	Alex Grant	Boston Bruins	1-year, $700,000	
July 1, 2017	Ryan Murphy	Calgary Flames	1-year, $700,000	
July 1, 2017	Cal O'Reilly	Buffalo Sabres	2-year, $1.4 million	
July 1, 2017	Kyle Quincey	Columbus Blue Jackets	1-year, $1.25 million	
July 1, 2017	Kyle Rau	Florida Panthers	1-year, $700,000	
July 1, 2017	Niklas Svedberg	Salavat Yulaev Ufa	1-year, $700,000	
August 16, 2017	Matt Cullen	Pittsburgh Penguins	1-year, $1 million	
September 18, 2017	Dereck Baribeau	Quebec Remparts	3-year, $2.3 million entry-level contract	
September 26, 2017	Brennan Menell	Lethbridge Hurricanes	3-year, $2.775 million entry-level contract	
October 4, 2017	Daniel Winnik	Washington Capitals	1-year, $660,000	
May 2, 2018	Eric Martinsson	Växjö Lakers	1-year, $925,000 entry-level contract	

=== Free agents lost ===
Date	Player	New team	Contract terms (in U.S. dollars)	Ref
July 1, 2017	Christian Folin	Los Angeles Kings	1-year, $850,000	
July 1, 2017	Martin Hanzal	Dallas Stars	3-year, $14.25 million	
July 1, 2017	Darcy Kuemper	Los Angeles Kings	1-year, $650,000	
July 19, 2017	Brady Brassart	Idaho Steelheads	1-year	
July 21, 2017	Alex Gudbranson	Toronto Marlies	Unknown	
August 8, 2017	Nate Prosser	St. Louis Blues	2-year, $1.3 million	
May 25, 2018	Viktor Loov	Jokerit	1-year	
May 25, 2018	Adam Vay	Saryarka Karagandy	Unknown	
June 8, 2018	Niklas Svedberg	Timrå	2-year	
June 15, 2018	Alex Grant	Jokerit	1-year	

=== Claimed via waivers ===
Player	Previous team	Date	Ref
Nate Prosser	St. Louis Blues	November 30, 2017	

=== Lost via waivers ===
Player	New team	Date	Ref
Chris Stewart	Calgary Flames	February 26, 2018	

=== Lost via retirement ===
Date	Player	Ref
September 12, 2017	Ryan Carter	

=== Player signings ===
Date	Player	Contract terms (in U.S. dollars)	Ref
June 26, 2017	Gustav Olofsson	2-year, $1.45 million	
June 27, 2017	Pat Cannone	1-year, $650,000	
July 2, 2017	Mike Reilly	2-year, $1.45 million	
July 3, 2017	Zach Palmquist	1-year, $726,000	
July 8, 2017	Kurtis Gabriel	1-year, $715,000	
July 10, 2017	Steve Michalek	1-year, $715,000	
July 10, 2017	Zack Mitchell	1-year, $660,000	
July 30, 2017	Nino Niederreiter	5-year, $26.25 million	
August 1, 2017	Mikael Granlund	3-year, $17.25 million	
September 14, 2017	Marcus Foligno	4-year, $11.5 million	
December 11, 2017	Ivan Lodnia	3-year, $2.775 million entry-level contract	
March 26, 2018	Jordan Greenway	3-year, $3.675 million entry-level contract	
April 5, 2018	Louis Belpedio	2-year, $1.85 million entry-level contract	
April 27, 2018	Mason Shaw	3-year, $2.775 million entry-level contract	
April 30, 2018	Sam Anas	2-year, $1.35 million contract extension	
May 2, 2018	Dmitri Sokolov	3-year, $2.49 million entry-level contract	
May 16, 2018	Kaapo Kahkonen	2-year, entry-level contract	

== Draft picks ==
Below are the Minnesota Wild's selections at the 2017 NHL entry draft, which was held on June 23 and 24, 2017 at the United Center in Chicago.

Round	#	Player	Pos	Nationality	College/Junior/Club team (League)
3	85	Ivan Lodnia	RW	United States	Erie Otters (OHL)
4	97^{1}	Mason Shaw	C	Canada	Medicine Hat Tigers (WHL)
4	116	Bryce Misley	C	Canada	Oakville Blades (OJHL)
5	147	Jacob Golden	D	Canada	London Knights (OHL)
6	178	Andrei Svetlakov	C	Russia	CSKA Moscow (KHL)
7	209	Nick Swaney	C	United States	Waterloo Black Hawks (USHL)

Draft notes:

1. The Arizona Coyotes' fourth-round pick went to the Minnesota Wild as the result of a trade on February 26, 2017 that sent Grayson Downing, a first-round pick in 2017, a second-round pick in 2018 and a conditional fourth-round pick in 2019 to Arizona in exchange for Martin Hanzal, Ryan White and this pick.
