= 2017–18 Los Angeles Kings season =

Professional ice hockey team season

2017–18 Los Angeles Kings
- Division: 4th Pacific
- Conference: 7th Western
- 2017–18 record: 45–29–8
- Home record: 23–15–3
- Road record: 22–14–5
- Goals for: 239
- Goals against: 203

Team information
- General manager: Rob Blake
- Coach: John Stevens
- Captain: Anze Kopitar
- Alternate captains: Jeff Carter; Drew Doughty
- Arena: Staples Center
- Average attendance: 18,240
- Minor league affiliates: Ontario Reign (AHL); Manchester Monarchs (ECHL)

Team leaders
- Goals: Anze Kopitar (35)
- Assists: Anze Kopitar (57)
- Points: Anze Kopitar (92)
- Penalty minutes: Dustin Brown (58)
- Plus/minus: Dustin Brown (+31)
- Wins: Jonathan Quick (33)
- Goals against average: Jonathan Quick (2.40)

The 2017–18 Los Angeles Kings season was the 51st season (50th season of play) for the National Hockey League (NHL) franchise that was established on June 5, 1967. The Kings made the playoffs, but were swept by the Vegas Golden Knights in the First Round.

== Standings ==
Pacific Division
Pos	Team	GP	W	L	OTL	ROW	GF	GA	GD	Pts
1	y – Vegas Golden Knights	82	51	24	7	47	272	228	+44	109
2	x – Anaheim Ducks	82	44	25	13	40	235	216	+19	101
3	x – San Jose Sharks	82	45	27	10	40	252	229	+23	100
4	x – Los Angeles Kings	82	45	29	8	43	239	203	+36	98
5	Calgary Flames	82	37	35	10	35	218	248	−30	84
6	Edmonton Oilers	82	36	40	6	31	234	263	−29	78
7	Vancouver Canucks	82	31	40	11	31	218	264	−46	73
8	Arizona Coyotes	82	29	41	12	27	208	256	−48	70

Source: National Hockey League
x – Clinched playoff spot; y – Clinched division

Western Conference Wild Card
Pos	Div	Team	GP	W	L	OTL	ROW	GF	GA	GD	Pts
1	PA	x – Los Angeles Kings	82	45	29	8	43	239	203	+36	98
2	CE	x – Colorado Avalanche	82	43	30	9	41	257	237	+20	95
3	CE	St. Louis Blues	82	44	32	6	41	226	222	+4	94
4	CE	Dallas Stars	82	42	32	8	38	235	225	+10	92
5	PA	Calgary Flames	82	37	35	10	35	218	248	−30	84
6	PA	Edmonton Oilers	82	36	40	6	31	234	263	−29	78
7	CE	Chicago Blackhawks	82	33	39	10	32	229	256	−27	76
8	PA	Vancouver Canucks	82	31	40	11	31	218	264	−46	73
9	PA	Arizona Coyotes	82	29	41	12	27	208	256	−48	70

Source: National Hockey League
x – Clinched playoff spot

== Schedule and results ==
=== Preseason ===
The Kings announced their preseason schedule on June 15, 2017.

2017 preseason game log: 5–1–1 (Home: 3–0–1; Road: 2–1–0)
#	Date	Visitor	Score	Home	OT	Decision	Attendance	Record	Recap
1	September 16	Vancouver	4–3	Los Angeles	OT	Quick	11,846	0–0–1	Recap
2	September 18	Los Angeles	–	Arizona	Game was cancelled by the Coyotes due to poor ice conditions
3^{[a]}	September 21	Vancouver	2–5	Los Angeles		—	10,088	1–0–1	Recap
4	September 22	Los Angeles	2–4	Anaheim		Petersen	15,393	1–1–1	Recap
5^{[b]}	September 23	Los Angeles	4–3	Vancouver	SO	—	12,759	2–1–1	Recap
6	September 26	Los Angeles	3–2	Vegas	OT	Campbell	17,101	3–1–1	Recap
7	September 28	Arizona	1–4	Los Angeles		Quick	11,214	4–1–1	Recap
8	September 30	Anaheim	0–1	Los Angeles	OT	Kuemper	17,237	5–1–1	Recap
Notes:^{a} Game was played at Mercedes-Benz Arena in Shanghai, China.^{b} Game was played at LeSports Center in Beijing, China.

=== Regular season ===
The team's regular season schedule was released on June 22, 2017.

2017–18 game log

October: 9–2–1 (Home: 4–0–1; Road: 5–2–0)
#	Date	Visitor	Score	Home	OT	Decision	Attendance	Record	Pts	Recap
1	October 5	Philadelphia	0–2	Los Angeles		Quick	18,230	1–0–0	2	Recap
2	October 7	Los Angeles	4–1	San Jose		Quick	17,562	2–0–0	4	Recap
3	October 11	Calgary	4–3	Los Angeles	OT	Quick	18,230	2–0–1	5	Recap
4	October 14	Buffalo	2–4	Los Angeles		Quick	18,230	3–0–1	7	Recap
5	October 15	NY Islanders	2–3	Los Angeles		Kuemper	18,230	4–0–1	9	Recap
6	October 18	Montreal	1–5	Los Angeles		Quick	18,230	5–0–1	11	Recap
7	October 21	Los Angeles	6–4	Columbus		Quick	15,329	6–0–1	13	Recap
8	October 23	Los Angeles	2–3	Toronto		Quick	19,235	6–1–1	13	Recap
9	October 24	Los Angeles	3–2	Ottawa	SO	Kuemper	14,034	7–1–1	15	Recap
10	October 26	Los Angeles	4–0	Montreal		Quick	21,302	8–1–1	17	Recap
11	October 28	Los Angeles	2–1	Boston	OT	Quick	17,565	9–1–1	19	Recap
12	October 30	Los Angeles	2–4	St. Louis		Quick	17,423	9–2–1	19	Recap

November: 6–6–2 (Home: 4–5–1; Road: 2–1–1)
#	Date	Visitor	Score	Home	OT	Decision	Attendance	Record	Pts	Recap
13	November 2	Toronto	3–5	Los Angeles		Quick	18,230	10–2–1	21	Recap
14	November 4	Nashville	4–3	Los Angeles	OT	Kuemper	18,230	10–2–2	22	Recap
15	November 7	Los Angeles	4–3	Anaheim	OT	Quick	16,637	11–2–2	24	Recap
16	November 9	Tampa Bay	5–2	Los Angeles		Quick	18,230	11–3–2	24	Recap
17	November 12	San Jose	2–1	Los Angeles		Quick	18,230	11–4–2	24	Recap
18	November 14	Vancouver	3–2	Los Angeles		Quick	18,230	11–5–2	24	Recap
19	November 16	Boston	2–1	Los Angeles		Quick	18,230	11–6–2	24	Recap
20	November 18	Florida	0–4	Los Angeles		Kuemper	18,230	12–6–2	26	Recap
21	November 19	Los Angeles	2–4	Vegas		Quick	18,211	12–7–2	26	Recap
22	November 22	Winnipeg	2–1	Los Angeles		Quick	18,230	12–8–2	26	Recap
23	November 24	Los Angeles	2–3	Arizona	OT	Kuemper	12,285	12–8–3	27	Recap
24	November 25	Anaheim	1–2	Los Angeles	SO	Quick	18,230	13–8–3	29	Recap
25	November 28	Los Angeles	4–1	Detroit		Quick	19,515	14–8–3	31	Recap
26	November 30	Los Angeles	5–2	Washington		Quick	18,506	15–8–3	33	Recap

December: 8–3–2 (Home: 4–0–1; Road: 4–3–1)
#	Date	Visitor	Score	Home	OT	Decision	Attendance	Record	Pts	Recap
27	December 1	Los Angeles	4–1	St. Louis		Kuemper	18,322	16–8–3	35	Recap
28	December 3	Los Angeles	3–1	Chicago		Quick	21,622	17–8–3	37	Recap
29	December 5	Minnesota	2–5	Los Angeles		Quick	18,230	18–8–3	39	Recap
30	December 7	Ottawa	3–4	Los Angeles	OT	Kuemper	18,230	19–8–3	41	Recap
31	December 9	Carolina	2–3	Los Angeles	OT	Quick	18,230	20–8–3	43	Recap
32	December 12	Los Angeles	1–5	New Jersey		Quick	13,275	20–9–3	43	Recap
33	December 15	Los Angeles	2–4	NY Rangers		Quick	17,756	20–10–3	43	Recap
34	December 16	Los Angeles	3–4	NY Islanders	OT	Kuemper	13,087	20–10–4	44	Recap
35	December 18	Los Angeles	4–1	Philadelphia		Quick	19,617	21–10–4	46	Recap
36	December 21	Colorado	1–2	Los Angeles	OT	Quick	18,230	22–10–4	48	Recap
37	December 23	Los Angeles	0–2	San Jose		Quick	17,562	22–11–4	48	Recap
38	December 28	Vegas	3–2	Los Angeles	OT	Quick	18,432	22–11–5	49	Recap
39	December 30	Los Angeles	4–3	Vancouver		Quick	18,865	23–11–5	51	Recap

January: 4–7–0 (Home: 1–4–0; Road: 3–3–0)
#	Date	Visitor	Score	Home	OT	Decision	Attendance	Record	Pts	Recap
40	January 2	Los Angeles	5–0	Edmonton		Quick	18,347	24–11–5	53	Recap
41	January 4	Los Angeles	3–4	Calgary		Quick	19,206	24–12–5	53	Recap
42	January 6	Nashville	4–3	Los Angeles		Quick	18,230	24–13–5	53	Recap
43	January 13	Anaheim	4–2	Los Angeles		Quick	18,443	24–14–5	53	Recap
44	January 15	San Jose	4–1	Los Angeles		Kuemper	18,230	24–15–5	53	Recap
45	January 18	Pittsburgh	3–1	Los Angeles		Quick	18,230	24–16–5	53	Recap
46	January 19	Los Angeles	1–2	Anaheim		Quick	17,258	24–17–5	53	Recap
47	January 21	NY Rangers	2–4	Los Angeles		Quick	18,230	25–17–5	55	Recap
48	January 23	Los Angeles	2–6	Vancouver		Quick	18,865	25–18–5	55	Recap
49	January 24	Los Angeles	2–1	Calgary	OT	Kuemper	19,004	26–18–5	57	Recap
50	January 30	Los Angeles	3–0	Dallas		Kuemper	17,655	27–18–5	59	Recap

February: 8–6–0 (Home: 3–2–0; Road: 5–4–0)
#	Date	Visitor	Score	Home	OT	Decision	Attendance	Record	Pts	Recap
51	February 1	Los Angeles	0–5	Nashville		Quick	17,384	27–19–5	59	Recap
52	February 3	Arizona	0–6	Los Angeles		Kuemper	18,230	28–19–5	61	Recap
53	February 7	Edmonton	2–5	Los Angeles		Kuemper	18,230	29–19–5	63	Recap
54	February 9	Los Angeles	3–1	Florida		Quick	14,099	30–19–5	65	Recap
55	February 10	Los Angeles	3–4	Tampa Bay		Quick	19,092	30–20–5	65	Recap
56	February 13	Los Angeles	3–7	Carolina		Quick	12,805	30–21–5	65	Recap
57	February 15	Los Angeles	1–3	Pittsburgh		Quick	18,604	30–22–5	65	Recap
58	February 17	Los Angeles	4–2	Buffalo		Quick	18,632	31–22–5	67	Recap
59	February 19	Los Angeles	3–1	Chicago		Quick	21,339	32–22–5	69	Recap
60	February 20	Los Angeles	4–3	Winnipeg		Kuemper	15,321	33–22–5	71	Recap
61	February 22	Dallas	2–0	Los Angeles		Quick	18,230	33–23–5	71	Recap
62	February 24	Edmonton	4–3	Los Angeles		Quick	18,230	33–24–5	71	Recap
63	February 26	Vegas	2–3	Los Angeles	OT	Quick	18,230	34–24–5	73	Recap
64	February 27	Los Angeles	4–1	Vegas		Campbell	18,328	35–24–5	75	Recap

March: 8–4–3 (Home: 6–3–0; Road: 2–1–3)
#	Date	Visitor	Score	Home	OT	Decision	Attendance	Record	Pts	Recap
65	March 1	Columbus	2–5	Los Angeles		Quick	18,230	36–24–5	77	Recap
66	March 3	Chicago	5–3	Los Angeles		Quick	18,230	36–25–5	77	Recap
67	March 8	Washington	1–3	Los Angeles		Quick	18,230	37–25–5	79	Recap
68	March 10	St. Louis	7–2	Los Angeles		Quick	18,230	37–26–5	79	Recap
69	March 12	Vancouver	0–3	Los Angeles		Quick	18,230	38–26–5	81	Recap
70	March 13	Los Angeles	3–4	Arizona	SO	Campbell	11,346	38–26–6	82	Recap
71	March 15	Detroit	1–4	Los Angeles		Quick	18,230	39–26–6	84	Recap
72	March 17	New Jersey	3–0	Los Angeles		Quick	18,230	39–27–6	84	Recap
73	March 19	Los Angeles	4–3	Minnesota	OT	Quick	19,081	40–27–6	86	Recap
74	March 20	Los Angeles	1–2	Winnipeg	OT	Campbell	15,321	40–27–7	87	Recap
75	March 22	Los Angeles	7–1	Colorado		Quick	17,071	41–27–7	89	Recap
76	March 24	Los Angeles	2–3	Edmonton		Quick	18,347	41–28–7	89	Recap
77	March 26	Calgary	0–3	Los Angeles		Quick	18,230	42–28–7	91	Recap
78	March 29	Arizona	2–4	Los Angeles		Campbell	18,230	43–28–7	93	Recap
79	March 30	Los Angeles	1–2	Anaheim	OT	Quick	17,473	43–28–8	94	Recap

April: 2–1–0 (Home: 2–1–0; Road: 0–0–0)
#	Date	Visitor	Score	Home	OT	Decision	Attendance	Record	Pts	Recap
80	April 2	Colorado	1–3	Los Angeles		Quick	18,230	44–28–8	96	Recap
81	April 5	Minnesota	4–5	Los Angeles	OT	Quick	18,230	45–28–8	98	Recap
82	April 7	Dallas	4–2	Los Angeles		Quick	18,230	45–29–8	98	Recap

Legend: Win (2 points) Loss (0 points) Overtime/shootout loss (1 point)

=== Playoffs ===
2018 Stanley Cup playoffs

Western Conference First Round vs. (P1) Vegas Golden Knights: Vegas won 4–0
#	Date	Visitor	Score	Home	OT	Decision	Attendance	Series	Recap
1	April 11	Los Angeles	0–1	Vegas		Quick	18,479	0–1	Recap
2	April 13	Los Angeles	1–2	Vegas	2OT	Quick	18,588	0–2	Recap
3	April 15	Vegas	3–2	Los Angeles		Quick	18,484	0–3	Recap
4	April 17	Vegas	1–0	Los Angeles		Quick	18,422	0–4	Recap

Legend: Win Loss

== Player statistics ==
Final Stats

=== Skaters ===
Regular season
Player	GP	G	A	Pts	+/−	PIM
Anze Kopitar	82	35	57	92	21	20
Dustin Brown	81	28	33	61	31	58
Drew Doughty	82	10	50	60	23	54
Tyler Toffoli	82	24	23	47	9	16
Jake Muzzin	74	8	34	42	10	40
Tanner Pearson	82	15	25	40	11	27
Adrian Kempe	81	16	21	37	11	49
Trevor Lewis	68	14	12	26	−6	25
Alec Martinez	77	9	16	25	3	34
Alex Iafallo	75	9	16	25	10	12
Jeff Carter	27	13	9	22	4	2
Derek Forbort	78	1	17	18	18	49
Nick Shore^{‡}	49	4	11	15	−4	12
Marian Gaborík^{‡}	30	7	7	14	9	18
Christian Folin	65	3	10	13	1	30
Torrey Mitchell^{†}	49	6	5	11	−5	28
Kyle Clifford	50	6	4	10	−4	48
Dion Phaneuf^{†}	26	3	7	10	−7	15
Andy Andreoff	45	3	6	9	−6	50
Oscar Fantenberg	27	2	7	9	2	11
Michael Amadio	37	4	4	8	−2	8
Michael Cammalleri^{‡}	15	3	4	7	1	4
Jonny Brodzinski	35	4	2	6	4	6
Tobias Rieder^{†}	20	4	2	6	−1	0
Nate Thompson^{†}	26	1	5	6	−1	10
Jussi Jokinen^{†‡}	18	1	4	5	0	4
Paul LaDue	12	3	1	4	5	6
Kurtis MacDermid	34	1	3	4	−4	57
Kevin Gravel	16	0	3	3	−3	2
Daniel Brickley	1	0	1	1	1	0
Brooks Laich	12	0	1	1	−5	6
Nic Dowd^{‡}	16	0	1	1	−3	12
Andrew Crescenzi	2	0	0	0	0	2
Justin Auger	2	0	0	0	−1	0

Playoffs
Player	GP	G	A	Pts	+/−	PIM
Anze Kopitar	4	1	1	2	0	0
Alex Iafallo	3	1	0	1	−1	0
Paul LaDue	2	1	0	1	0	0
Dion Phaneuf	4	0	1	1	−1	4
Dustin Brown	4	0	1	1	1	4
Oscar Fantenberg	4	0	1	1	0	2
Michael Amadio	1	0	1	1	0	0
Alec Martinez	4	0	0	0	−2	0
Trevor Lewis	4	0	0	0	−2	4
Tanner Pearson	4	0	0	0	−1	0
Jeff Carter	4	0	0	0	0	2
Nate Thompson	4	0	0	0	−1	0
Torrey Mitchell	4	0	0	0	−1	0
Christian Folin	4	0	0	0	−4	0
Adrian Kempe	4	0	0	0	−2	2
Tyler Toffoli	4	0	0	0	−1	0
Jake Muzzin	2	0	0	0	−1	2
Tobias Rieder	4	0	0	0	−1	0
Kevin Gravel	1	0	0	0	−1	0
Drew Doughty	3	0	0	0	1	0
Kyle Clifford	4	0	0	0	−2	6

=== Goaltenders ===
Regular season
Player	GP	GS	TOI	W	L	OT	GA	GAA	SA	SV%	SO	G	A	PIM
Jonathan Quick	64	63	3,677:05	33	28	3	147	2.40	1,867	.921	5	0	4	10
Darcy Kuemper^{‡}	19	15	999:13	10	1	3	35	2.10	516	.932	3	0	1	0
Jack Campbell	5	4	266:37	2	0	2	11	2.48	145	.924	0	0	0	0

Playoffs
Player	GP	GS	TOI	W	L	GA	GAA	SA	SV%	SO	G	A	PIM
Jonathan Quick	4	4	271:26	0	4	7	1.55	131	.947	0	0	0	0

^{†}Denotes player spent time with another team before joining the Kings. Stats reflect time with the Kings only.
^{‡}Traded mid-season. Stats reflect time with the Kings only.
Bold/italics denotes franchise record

== Transactions ==
The Kings have been involved in the following transactions during the 2017–18 season.

=== Trades ===
Date	Details		Ref
November 14, 2017	To Edmonton Oilers Michael Cammalleri	To Los Angeles Kings Jussi Jokinen
November 23, 2017	To Montreal Canadiens Conditional 5th-round draft pick in 2018	To Los Angeles Kings Torrey Mitchell
December 7, 2017	To Vancouver Canucks Nic Dowd	To Los Angeles Kings Jordan Subban
January 22, 2018	To Columbus Blue Jackets Jeff Zatkoff	To Los Angeles Kings Future considerations
February 5, 2018	To Vegas Golden Knights Zachary Leslie	To Los Angeles Kings Future considerations
February 13, 2018	To Ottawa Senators Marian Gaborik; Nick Shore	To Los Angeles Kings Dion Phaneuf; Nate Thompson
February 21, 2018	To Arizona Coyotes Darcy Kuemper	To Los Angeles Kings Tobias Rieder^{[Note 1]} Scott Wedgewood
June 13, 2018	To Tampa Bay Lightning Andy Andreoff	To Los Angeles Kings Peter Budaj

Notes:

- ^{Note 1} Arizona to retain 15% of salary as part of trade.

=== Free agents acquired ===
Date	Player	Former team	Contract terms (in U.S. dollars)	Ref
July 1, 2017	Michael Cammalleri	New Jersey Devils	1-year, $1 million	
July 1, 2017	Stepan Falkovsky	Stockton Heat	3-year, $2.095 million entry-level contract	
July 1, 2017	Christian Folin	Minnesota Wild	1-year, $850,000	
July 1, 2017	Darcy Kuemper	Minnesota Wild	1-year, $650,000	
July 1, 2017	Cal Petersen	Notre Dame Fighting Irish	2-year, $1.85 million entry-level contract	
October 19, 2017	Brooks Laich	Toronto Maple Leafs	1-year, $650,000	
November 27, 2017	Austin Strand	Seattle Thunderbirds	3-year, $2.775 million entry-level contract	
December 8, 2017	Cole Kehler	Portland Winterhawks	3-year, $2.35 million entry-level contract	
March 29, 2018	Daniel Brickley	Minnesota State Mavericks	2-year, $2.7 million entry-level contract	
March 30, 2018	Sheldon Rempal	Clarkson Golden Knights	2-year, $2.7 million entry-level contract	
May 1, 2018	Brad Morrison	Lethbridge Hurricanes	3-year, $2.23 million entry-level contract	

=== Free agents lost ===
Date	Player	New team	Contract terms (in U.S. dollars)	Ref
July 1, 2017	Vincent LoVerde	Toronto Maple Leafs	2-year, $1.45 million	
July 1, 2017	Cameron Schilling	Winnipeg Jets	1-year, $650,000	
July 1, 2017	Zach Trotman	Pittsburgh Penguins	1-year, $650,000	
August 3, 2017	Patrick Bjorkstrand	KooKoo	1-year	
October 11, 2017	Joel Lowry	Manchester Monarchs	1-year	

=== Claimed via waivers ===
Player	Previous team	Date	Ref

=== Lost via waivers ===
Player	New team	Date	Ref
Jordan Nolan	Buffalo Sabres	September 27, 2017	
Jussi Jokinen	Columbus Blue Jackets	January 17, 2018	

=== Players released ===
Date	Player	Via	Ref
November 26, 2017	Brooks Laich	Contract termination	

=== Lost via retirement ===
Date	Player	Ref

=== Player signings ===
Date	Player	Contract terms (in U.S. dollars)	Ref
June 24, 2017	Andy Andreoff	2-year, $1.355 million	
July 6, 2017	Nick Shore	1-year, $925,000	
July 14, 2017	Justin Auger	1-year, $650,000	
July 14, 2017	Jonny Brodzinski	2-year, $1.3 million	
July 14, 2017	Andrew Crescenzi	1-year, $650,000	
July 14, 2017	Kevin Gravel	1-year, $650,000	
July 14, 2017	Paul LaDue	1-year, $874,125	
July 14, 2017	Zachary Leslie	1-year, $650,000	
July 14, 2017	Kurtis MacDermid	1-year, $650,000	
September 25, 2017	Jaret Anderson-Dolan	3-year, $2.775 million entry-level contract	
October 19, 2017	Derek Forbort	2-year, $5.05 million	
November 22, 2017	Jack Campbell	2-year, $1.35 million	
March 1, 2018	Gabriel Vilardi	3-year, $4.975 million entry-level contract	
March 29, 2018	Michael Eyssimont	2-year, $1.85 million entry-level contract	
April 27, 2018	Matt Villalta	3-year, $2.775 million entry-level contract	
May 17, 2018	Oscar Fantenberg	1-year, $650,000 contract extension	

== Draft picks ==
Below are the Los Angeles Kings' selections at the 2017 NHL entry draft, which was held on June 23 and 24, 2017 at the United Center in Chicago.

Round	#	Player	Pos	Nationality	College/Junior/Club team (League)
1	11	Gabriel Vilardi	C	Canada	Windsor Spitfires (OHL)
2	41	Jaret Anderson-Dolan	C	Canada	Spokane Chiefs (WHL)
3	72	Matt Villalta	G	Canada	Sault Ste. Marie Greyhounds (OHL)
4	103	Mikey Anderson	D	United States	Waterloo Black Hawks (USHL)
4	118^{1}	Markus Phillips	D	Canada	Owen Sound Attack (OHL)
5	134	Cole Hults	D	United States	Madison Capitols (USHL)
5	138^{2}	Drake Rymsha	C	United States	Sarnia Sting (OHL)

Notes:

1. The Montreal Canadiens' fourth-round pick went to the Los Angeles Kings as the result of a trade on May 9, 2017 that sent Ben Bishop to Dallas in exchange for this pick.
2. The Tampa Bay Lightning's fifth-round pick went to the Los Angeles Kings as the result of a trade on February 26, 2017 that sent Peter Budaj, Erik Cernak, a conditional pick in 2017 and a seventh-round pick in 2017 in exchange for Ben Bishop and this pick.
