= 2017–18 New York Islanders season =

Professional ice hockey team season

2017–18 New York Islanders
- Division: 7th Metropolitan
- Conference: 11th Eastern
- 2017–18 record: 35–37–10
- Home record: 19–18–4
- Road record: 16–19–6
- Goals for: 264
- Goals against: 296

Team information
- General manager: Garth Snow
- Coach: Doug Weight
- Captain: John Tavares
- Alternate captains: Cal Clutterbuck; Andrew Ladd
- Arena: Barclays Center
- Average attendance: 12,002
- Minor league affiliates: Bridgeport Sound Tigers (AHL); Worcester Railers (ECHL)

Team leaders
- Goals: Anders Lee (40)
- Assists: Mathew Barzal (63)
- Points: Mathew Barzal (85)
- Penalty minutes: Ross Johnston (62)
- Plus/minus: Thomas Hickey (+20)
- Wins: Jaroslav Halák (20)
- Goals against average: Jaroslav Halák (3.19)

The 2017–18 New York Islanders season was the 46th season in the franchise's history. It was their third season in the Barclays Center in the New York City borough of Brooklyn, which they moved into after leaving Nassau Veterans Memorial Coliseum in Nassau County on Long Island at the conclusion of the 2014–15 season. The Islanders missed the playoffs for the second consecutive season.

== Standings ==
=== Divisional standings ===
Metropolitan Division
Pos	Team	GP	W	L	OTL	ROW	GF	GA	GD	Pts
1	y – Washington Capitals	82	49	26	7	46	259	239	+20	105
2	x – Pittsburgh Penguins	82	47	29	6	45	272	250	+22	100
3	x – Philadelphia Flyers	82	42	26	14	40	251	243	+8	98
4	x – Columbus Blue Jackets	82	45	30	7	39	242	230	+12	97
5	x – New Jersey Devils	82	44	29	9	39	248	244	+4	97
6	Carolina Hurricanes	82	36	35	11	33	228	256	−28	83
7	New York Islanders	82	35	37	10	32	264	296	−32	80
8	New York Rangers	82	34	39	9	31	231	268	−37	77

Source: National Hockey League
x – Clinched playoff spot; y – Clinched division

=== Conference standings ===
Eastern Conference Wild Card
Pos	Div	Team	GP	W	L	OTL	ROW	GF	GA	GD	Pts
1	ME	x – Columbus Blue Jackets	82	45	30	7	39	242	230	+12	97
2	ME	x – New Jersey Devils	82	44	29	9	39	248	244	+4	97
3	AT	Florida Panthers	82	44	30	8	41	248	246	+2	96
4	ME	Carolina Hurricanes	82	36	35	11	33	228	256	−28	83
5	ME	New York Islanders	82	35	37	10	32	264	296	−32	80
6	ME	New York Rangers	82	34	39	9	31	231	268	−37	77
7	AT	Detroit Red Wings	82	30	39	13	25	217	255	−38	73
8	AT	Montreal Canadiens	82	29	40	13	27	209	264	−55	71
9	AT	Ottawa Senators	82	28	43	11	26	221	291	−70	67
10	AT	Buffalo Sabres	82	25	45	12	24	199	280	−81	62

Source: National Hockey League
x – Clinched playoff spot

== Schedule and results ==
=== Preseason ===
The Islanders released their preseason schedule on June 15, 2017.

2017 preseason game log: 6–0–2 (Home: 4–0–0; Road: 2–0–2)
#	Date	Visitor	Score	Home	OT	Decision	Attendance	Record	Recap
1^{[a]}	September 17	Philadelphia	2–3	NY Islanders	OT	—	—	1–0–0
2	September 18	NY Islanders	0–1	NY Rangers	OT	McAdam	13,979	1–0–1
3^{[A]}^{[b]}	September 20	NY Islanders	2–3	Philadelphia	OT	—	—	1–0–2
4^{[A]}	September 20	Philadelphia	2–3	NY Islanders	OT	Gudlevskis	5,042	2–0–2
5^{[c]}	September 22	NY Rangers	1–2	NY Islanders		—	—	3–0–2
6	September 25	New Jersey	0–3	NY Islanders		Greiss	5,615	4–0–2
7	September 29	NY Islanders	3–1	Buffalo		Halák	16,967	5–0–2
8	October 1	NY Islanders	5–2	Philadelphia		Greiss	18,575	6–0–2
Notes:^{A} Indicates split-squad.^{a} Game was played at Nassau Veterans Memorial Coliseum in Uniondale, New York.^{b} Game was played at PPL Center in Allentown, Pennsylvania.^{c} Game was played at Webster Bank Arena in Bridgeport, Connecticut.

=== Regular season ===
The Islanders published their regular season schedule on June 22, 2017.

2017–18 game log

October: 7–4–1 (Home: 4–0–1; Road: 3–4–0)
#	Date	Visitor	Score	Home	OT	Decision	Attendance	Record	Pts	Recap
1	October 6	NY Islanders	0–5	Columbus		Greiss	18,595	0–1–0	0
2	October 7	Buffalo	3–6	NY Islanders		Halák	15,234	1–1–0	2
3	October 9	St. Louis	3–2	NY Islanders	SO	Greiss	10,673	1–1–1	3
4	October 11	NY Islanders	2–3	Anaheim		Halák	14,553	1–2–1	3
5	October 14	NY Islanders	3–1	San Jose		Greiss	17,562	2–2–1	5
6	October 15	NY Islanders	2–3	Los Angeles		Halák	18,230	2–3–1	5
7	October 19	NY Islanders	4–3	NY Rangers	SO	Halák	18,006	3–3–1	7
8	October 21	San Jose	3–5	NY Islanders		Greiss	11,877	4–3–1	9
9	October 24	Arizona	3–5	NY Islanders		Halák	9,795	5–3–1	11
10	October 26	NY Islanders	4–6	Minnesota		Greiss	18,824	5–4–1	11
11	October 28	NY Islanders	6–2	Nashville		Halák	17,113	6–4–1	13
12	October 30	Vegas	3–6	NY Islanders		Halák	11,113	7–4–1	15

November: 8–3–1 (Home: 4–0–1; Road: 4–3–0)
#	Date	Visitor	Score	Home	OT	Decision	Attendance	Record	Pts	Recap
13	November 2	NY Islanders	3–4	Washington		Halák	18,506	7–5–1	15
14	November 5	Colorado	4–6	NY Islanders		Greiss	10,927	8–5–1	17
15	November 7	Edmonton	2–1	NY Islanders	OT	Greiss	12,281	8–5–2	18
16	November 10	NY Islanders	0–5	Dallas		Halák	18,342	8–6–2	18
17	November 11	NY Islanders	5–2	St. Louis		Greiss	18,761	9–6–2	20
18	November 16	Carolina	4–6	NY Islanders		Greiss	11,188	10–6–2	22
19	November 18	NY Islanders	5–3	Tampa Bay		Greiss	19,092	11–6–2	24
20	November 19	NY Islanders	2–4	Carolina		Halák	11,390	11–7–2	24
21	November 22	Philadelphia	3–4	NY Islanders	OT	Greiss	12,462	12–7–2	26
22	November 24	NY Islanders	5–4	Philadelphia	OT	Greiss	19,643	13–7–2	28
23	November 25	NY Islanders	2–1	Ottawa		Halák	17,276	14–7–2	30
24	November 28	Vancouver	2–5	NY Islanders		Halák	11,194	15–7–2	32

December: 5–8–2 (Home: 4–3–1; Road: 1–5–1)
#	Date	Visitor	Score	Home	OT	Decision	Attendance	Record	Pts	Recap
25	December 1	Ottawa	6–5	NY Islanders		Halák	11,797	15–8–2	32
26	December 4	NY Islanders	5–4	Florida	SO	Halák	11,210	16–8–2	34
27	December 5	NY Islanders	2–6	Tampa Bay		Greiss	19,092	16–9–2	34
28	December 7	NY Islanders	3–4	Pittsburgh	OT	Halák	18,433	16–9–3	35
29	December 9	NY Islanders	1–3	Boston		Halák	17,565	16–10–3	35
30	December 11	Washington	1–3	NY Islanders		Halák	11,053	17–10–3	37
31	December 13	Dallas	5–2	NY Islanders		Halák	10,316	17–11–3	37
32	December 14	NY Islanders	4–6	Columbus		Greiss	15,696	17–12–3	37
33	December 16	Los Angeles	3–4	NY Islanders	OT	Greiss	13,087	18–12–3	39
34	December 19	Detroit	6–3	NY Islanders		Greiss	10,511	18–13–3	39
35	December 21	Anaheim	5–4	NY Islanders	OT	Halák	10,092	18–13–4	40
36	December 23	Winnipeg	2–5	NY Islanders		Halák	13,589	19–13–4	42
37	December 27	Buffalo	2–3	NY Islanders	OT	Halák	15,027	20–13–4	44
38	December 29	NY Islanders	2–4	Winnipeg		Halák	15,321	20–14–4	44
39	December 31	NY Islanders	1–6	Colorado		Halák	17,461	20–15–4	44

January: 5–7–1 (Home: 1–5–0; Road: 4–2–1)
#	Date	Visitor	Score	Home	OT	Decision	Attendance	Record	Pts	Recap
40	January 2	Boston	5–1	NY Islanders		Halák	11,878	20–16–4	44
41	January 4	NY Islanders	4–6	Philadelphia		Greiss	19,358	20–17–4	44
42	January 5	Pittsburgh	4–0	NY Islanders		Halák	13,641	20–18–4	44
43	January 7	New Jersey	4–5	NY Islanders	SO	Halák	15,136	21–18–4	46
44	January 13	NY Islanders	7–2	NY Rangers		Halák	18,006	22–18–4	48
45	January 15	NY Islanders	5–4	Montreal	OT	Greiss	21,302	23–18–4	50
46	January 16	New Jersey	4–1	NY Islanders		Halák	12,695	23–19–4	50
47	January 18	Boston	5–2	NY Islanders		Halák	11,803	23–20–4	50
48	January 20	NY Islanders	7–3	Chicago		Halák	21,882	24–20–4	52
49	January 22	NY Islanders	2–3	Arizona	OT	Halák	11,707	24–20–5	53
50	January 25	NY Islanders	2–1	Vegas		Halák	18,184	25–20–5	55
51	January 30	Florida	4–1	NY Islanders		Halák	10,423	25–21–5	55
52	January 31	NY Islanders	0–5	Toronto		Greiss	19,267	25–22–5	55

February: 4–6–2 (Home: 3–3–1; Road: 1–3–1)
#	Date	Visitor	Score	Home	OT	Decision	Attendance	Record	Pts	Recap
53	February 3	Columbus	3–4	NY Islanders		Halák	13,597	26–22–5	57
54	February 5	Nashville	5–4	NY Islanders	OT	Halák	10,217	26–22–6	58
55	February 8	NY Islanders	3–4	Buffalo		Halák	16,872	26–23–6	58
56	February 9	Detroit	6–7	NY Islanders	OT	Halák	11,847	27–23–6	60
57	February 11	Calgary	3–2	NY Islanders		Halák	11,192	27–24–6	60
58	February 13	Columbus	4–1	NY Islanders		Halák	10,232	27–25–6	60
59	February 15	NY Rangers	0–3	NY Islanders		Halák	15,795	28–25–6	62
60	February 16	NY Islanders	3–0	Carolina		Greiss	15,448	29–25–6	64
61	February 19	Minnesota	5–3	NY Islanders		Halák	15,342	29–26–6	64
62	February 22	NY Islanders	3–4	Toronto	SO	Halák	18,856	29–26–7	65
63	February 24	NY Islanders	1–2	New Jersey		Halák	16,514	29–27–7	65
64	February 28	NY Islanders	1–3	Montreal		Halák	21,302	29–28–7	65

March: 3–9–3 (Home: 1–7–0; Road: 2–2–3)
#	Date	Visitor	Score	Home	OT	Decision	Attendance	Record	Pts	Recap
65	March 2	Montreal	6–3	NY Islanders		Halák	10,685	29–29–7	65
66	March 3	NY Islanders	2–3	Pittsburgh	OT	Gibson	18,661	29–29–8	66
67	March 5	NY Islanders	3–4	Vancouver	OT	Halák	17,307	29–29–9	67
68	March 8	NY Islanders	1–2	Edmonton	SO	Gibson	18,347	29–29–10	68
69	March 11	NY Islanders	5–2	Calgary		Gibson	19,108	30–29–10	70
70	March 15	Washington	7–3	NY Islanders		Gibson	10,740	30–30–10	70
71	March 16	NY Islanders	3–6	Washington		Halák	18,506	30–31–10	70
72	March 18	Carolina	4–3	NY Islanders		Halák	10,688	30–32–10	70
73	March 20	Pittsburgh	1–4	NY Islanders		Gibson	10,442	31–32–10	72
74	March 22	Tampa Bay	7–6	NY Islanders		Halák	10,354	31–33–10	72
75	March 24	Chicago	3–1	NY Islanders		Halák	13,091	31–34–10	72
76	March 26	Florida	3–0	NY Islanders		Gibson	10,951	31–35–10	72
77	March 27	NY Islanders	4–3	Ottawa		Halák	15,284	32–35–10	74
78	March 30	Toronto	5–4	NY Islanders		Gibson	13,018	32–36–10	74
79	March 31	NY Islanders	3–4	New Jersey		Greiss	16,514	32–37–10	74

April: 3–0–0 (Home: 2–0–0; Road: 1–0–0)
#	Date	Visitor	Score	Home	OT	Decision	Attendance	Record	Pts	Recap
80	April 3	Philadelphia	4–5	NY Islanders		Greiss	11,951	33–37–10	76
81	April 5	NY Rangers	1–2	NY Islanders		Halák	14,152	34–37–10	78
82	April 7	NY Islanders	4–3	Detroit	OT	Greiss	19,515	35–37–10	80

Legend: Win (2 points) Loss (0 points) Overtime/shootout loss (1 point)

== Player statistics ==
As of April 7, 2018

=== Skaters ===
Regular season
Player	GP	G	A	Pts	+/−	PIM
Mathew Barzal	82	22	63	85	1	30
John Tavares	82	37	47	84	−12	26
Josh Bailey	76	18	53	71	−20	17
Anders Lee	82	40	22	62	−25	44
Jordan Eberle	81	25	34	59	5	21
Nick Leddy	80	10	32	42	−42	20
Anthony Beauvillier	71	21	15	36	2	16
Brock Nelson	82	19	16	35	−4	43
Ryan Pulock	68	10	22	32	−4	14
Andrew Ladd	73	12	17	29	11	24
Thomas Hickey	69	5	20	25	20	24
Adam Pelech	78	3	16	19	7	28
Cal Clutterbuck	76	8	10	18	−7	53
Johnny Boychuk	58	6	12	18	−8	30
Casey Cizikas	64	7	10	17	−12	23
Josh Ho-Sang	22	2	10	12	−7	2
Scott Mayfield	47	2	10	12	−6	45
Calvin de Haan	33	1	11	12	11	8
Jason Chimera^{‡}	58	2	9	11	−11	25
Tanner Fritz	34	3	4	7	−3	8
Ross Johnston	24	3	3	6	0	62
Dennis Seidenberg	28	0	5	5	−9	17
Sebastian Aho	22	1	3	4	−5	6
Nikolay Kulemin	13	1	2	3	0	0
Alan Quine	21	0	3	3	−2	4
Shane Prince	14	1	1	2	−3	11
Brandon Davidson^{†}	15	1	1	2	−8	4
Chris Wagner^{†}	15	1	0	1	−3	2
Michael Dal Colle	4	0	0	0	0	0
Steve Bernier	4	0	0	0	−2	0

=== Goaltenders ===
Regular season
Player	GP	GS	TOI	W	L	OT	GA	GAA	SA	SV%	SO	G	A	PIM
Jaroslav Halák	54	49	3,024:03	20	26	6	161	3.19	1744	.908	1	0	0	4
Thomas Greiss	27	25	1,491:45	13	8	2	95	3.82	879	.892	1	0	0	0
Christopher Gibson	8	8	426:52	2	3	2	26	3.65	284	.908	0	0	0	0

- ^{†} Denotes player spent time with another team before joining the Islanders. Stats reflect time with the Islanders only.
- ^{‡} Denotes player was traded mid-season. Stats reflect time with the Islanders only.
- Bold/italics denotes franchise record.

== Awards and honors ==
=== Awards ===
Regular season
Player	Award	Date
Mathew Barzal	Calder Memorial Trophy	June 20, 2018

== Transactions ==
The Islanders have been involved in the following transactions during the 2017–18 season.

=== Trades ===
Date	Details		Ref
June 21, 2017	To Vegas Golden Knights Jake Bischoff; Mikhail Grabovski; NYI's 1st-round pick (15th overall) in 2017; NYI's 2nd-round pick in 2019	To New York Islanders Expansion Draft considerations^{1}	
June 22, 2017	To Edmonton Oilers Ryan Strome	To New York Islanders Jordan Eberle	
June 24, 2017	To Calgary Flames Travis Hamonic; NYI's conditional 4th-round pick in 2019 or 2020	To New York Islanders CGY's 1st-round pick in 2018; CGY's 2nd-round pick in 2018; CGY's conditional 2nd-round pick in 2019 or 2020	
July 1, 2017	To Tampa Bay Lightning Carter Verhaeghe	To New York Islanders Kristers Gudļevskis	
February 24, 2018	To Edmonton Oilers 3rd-round pick in 2019	To New York Islanders Brandon Davidson	
February 26, 2018	To Anaheim Ducks Jason Chimera	To New York Islanders Chris Wagner	

1. This trade ensured that the Vegas Golden Knights would select Jean-Francois Berube in the 2017 NHL expansion draft.

=== Free agents acquired ===
Date	Player	Former team	Contract terms (in U.S. dollars)	Ref
July 1, 2017	Seth Helgeson	New Jersey Devils	1-year, $650,000	
July 1, 2017	Kane Lafranchise	Bridgeport Sound Tigers	1-year, $650,000	
March 15, 2018	Scott Eansor	Bridgeport Sound Tigers	2-year, $1.44 million entry-level contract	
April 6, 2018	Yannick Rathgeb	HC Fribourg-Gottéron	2-year, $2.75 million entry-level contract	
May 8, 2018	Travis St. Denis	Bridgeport Sound Tigers	2-year, $1.35 million entry-level contract	

=== Free agents lost ===
Date	Player	New team	Contract terms (in U.S. dollars)	Ref
July 1, 2017	Bracken Kearns	New Jersey Devils	1-year, $650,000	
July 19, 2017	Matt Finn	Charlotte Checkers	Unknown	
July 26, 2017	Jesse Graham	Colorado Avalanche	1-year, $650,000	
September 13, 2017	Stephon Williams	San Jose Barracuda	1-year	
September 14, 2017	Loïc Leduc	Reading Royals	Unknown	
October 7, 2017	Ben Holmstrom	Bridgeport Sound Tigers	1-year	

=== Claimed via waivers ===
Player	Previous team	Date	Ref

=== Lost via waivers ===
Player	New team	Date	Ref

=== Players released ===
Date	Player	Via	Ref

=== Lost via retirement ===
Date	Player	Ref

=== Player signings ===
Date	Player	Contract terms (in U.S. dollars)	Ref
July 5, 2017	Sebastian Aho	3-year, $2.775 million entry-level contract	
July 11, 2017	Kristers Gudļevskis	1-year, $650,000	
July 14, 2017	Christopher Gibson	1-year, $650,000	
July 24, 2017	Adam Pelech	4-year, $6.4 million	
July 27, 2017	Connor Jones	1-year, $650,000	
August 2, 2017	Calvin de Haan	1-year, $3.3 million	
August 8, 2017	Stephen Gionta	1-year, $650,000	
September 22, 2017	Kieffer Bellows	3-year, $3.4125 million entry-level contract	
January 4, 2018	Scott Mayfield	5-year, $7.25 million contract extension	
February 23, 2018	Josh Bailey	6-year, $30 million contract extension	
March 21, 2018	Otto Koivula	3-year, $2.775 million entry-level contract	
April 6, 2018	David Quenneville	3-year, $2.775 million entry-level contract	

== Draft picks ==
Below are the List of New York Islanders draft picks' selections at the 2017 NHL entry draft, which was held on June 23 and 24, 2017, at the United Center in Chicago.

Round	#	Player	Pos	Nationality	College/junior/club team
2	46	Robin Salo	D	Finland	Vaasan Sport (Liiga)
3	77	Ben Mirageas	D	United States	Chicago Steel (USHL)
5	139	Sebastian Aho	D	Sweden	Skellefteå AIK (SHL)
6	165^{1}	Arnaud Durandeau	LW	Canada	Halifax Mooseheads (QMJHL)
7	201	Logan Cockerill	RW	United States	U.S. NTDP (USHL)

1. The Los Angeles Kings' sixth-round pick went to the New York Islanders as the result of a trade on June 24, 2017, that sent a sixth-round pick in 2018 to Los Angeles in exchange for this pick.
