= 2017–18 Colorado Avalanche season =

National Hockey League team season

2017–18 Colorado Avalanche
- Division: 4th Central
- Conference: 8th Western
- 2017–18 record: 43–30–9
- Home record: 28–11–2
- Road record: 15–19–7
- Goals for: 257
- Goals against: 237

Team information
- General manager: Joe Sakic
- Coach: Jared Bednar
- Captain: Gabriel Landeskog
- Alternate captains: Erik Johnson; Nathan MacKinnon
- Arena: Pepsi Center
- Average attendance: 15,586
- Minor league affiliates: San Antonio Rampage (AHL); Colorado Eagles (ECHL)

Team leaders
- Goals: Nathan MacKinnon (39)
- Assists: Nathan MacKinnon (58)
- Points: Nathan MacKinnon (97)
- Penalty minutes: Nikita Zadorov (103)
- Plus/minus: Patrik Nemeth (+27)
- Wins: Semyon Varlamov (24)
- Goals against average: Andrew Hammond (2.03)

The 2017–18 Colorado Avalanche season was the 23rd operational season and 22nd playing season since the franchise relocated from Quebec prior to the start of the 1995–96 NHL season. As well as the franchise's 39th season in the National Hockey League and 46th season overall. After finishing the previous season in last place with just 48 points (21 points behind the next worst team), the Avalanche clinched the playoffs for the first time since the 2013–14 season.

== Standings ==
Central Division
Pos	Team	GP	W	L	OTL	ROW	GF	GA	GD	Pts
1	p – Nashville Predators	82	53	18	11	47	267	211	+56	117
2	x – Winnipeg Jets	82	52	20	10	48	277	218	+59	114
3	x – Minnesota Wild	82	45	26	11	42	253	232	+21	101
4	x – Colorado Avalanche	82	43	30	9	41	257	237	+20	95
5	St. Louis Blues	82	44	32	6	41	226	222	+4	94
6	Dallas Stars	82	42	32	8	38	235	225	+10	92
7	Chicago Blackhawks	82	33	39	10	32	229	256	−27	76

Source: National Hockey League
p – Clinched Presidents' Trophy; x – Clinched playoff spot

Western Conference Wild Card
Pos	Div	Team	GP	W	L	OTL	ROW	GF	GA	GD	Pts
1	PA	x – Los Angeles Kings	82	45	29	8	43	239	203	+36	98
2	CE	x – Colorado Avalanche	82	43	30	9	41	257	237	+20	95
3	CE	St. Louis Blues	82	44	32	6	41	226	222	+4	94
4	CE	Dallas Stars	82	42	32	8	38	235	225	+10	92
5	PA	Calgary Flames	82	37	35	10	35	218	248	−30	84
6	PA	Edmonton Oilers	82	36	40	6	31	234	263	−29	78
7	CE	Chicago Blackhawks	82	33	39	10	32	229	256	−27	76
8	PA	Vancouver Canucks	82	31	40	11	31	218	264	−46	73
9	PA	Arizona Coyotes	82	29	41	12	27	208	256	−48	70

Source: National Hockey League
x – Clinched playoff spot

== Schedule and results ==
=== Preseason ===
The preseason schedule was released on June 13, 2017.

2017 preseason game log: 4–2–0 (Home: 2–1–0; Road: 2–1–0)
#	Date	Visitor	Score	Home	OT	Decision	Attendance	Record	Recap
1	September 19	Vegas	4–1	Colorado		Martin	—	0–1–0	Recap
2	September 21	Dallas	1–5	Colorado		Varlamov	—	1–1–0	Recap
3	September 23	Colorado	1–2	Minnesota		Bernier	18,754	1–2–0	Recap
4	September 24	Minnesota	1–5	Colorado		Varlamov	—	2–2–0	Recap
5	September 25	Colorado	4–2	Dallas		Bernier	10,200	3–2–0	Recap
6	September 28	Colorado	4–2	Vegas		Varlamov	15,337	4–2–0	Recap

=== Regular season ===
The regular season schedule was published on June 22, 2017.

2017–18 game log

October: 6–5–0 (Home: 4–1–0; Road: 2–4–0)
#	Date	Visitor	Score	Home	OT	Decision	Attendance	Record	Pts	Recap
1	October 5	Colorado	4–2	NY Rangers		Varlamov	18,006	1–0–0	2	Recap
2	October 7	Colorado	1–4	New Jersey		Bernier	16,514	1–1–0	2	Recap
3	October 9	Colorado	4–0	Boston		Varlamov	17,565	2–1–0	4	Recap
4	October 11	Boston	3–6	Colorado		Varlamov	18,011	3–1–0	6	Recap
5	October 13	Anaheim	1–3	Colorado		Bernier	15,393	4–1–0	8	Recap
6	October 14	Colorado	1–3	Dallas		Varlamov	17,967	4–2–0	8	Recap
7	October 17	Colorado	1–4	Nashville		Varlamov	17,113	4–3–0	8	Recap
8	October 19	St. Louis	4–3	Colorado		Bernier	13,890	4–4–0	8	Recap
9	October 24	Dallas	3–5	Colorado		Varlamov	12,823	5–4–0	10	Recap
10	October 27	Colorado	0–7	Vegas		Varlamov	17,702	5–5–0	10	Recap
11	October 28	Chicago	3–6	Colorado		Bernier	17,360	6–5–0	12	Recap

November: 6–4–2 (Home: 4–1–1; Road: 2–3–1)
#	Date	Visitor	Score	Home	OT	Decision	Attendance	Record	Pts	Recap
12	November 2	Carolina	3–5	Colorado		Varlamov	12,048	7–5–0	14	Recap
13	November 4	Colorado	5–4	Philadelphia	SO	Varlamov	19,616	8–5–0	16	Recap
14	November 5	Colorado	4–6	NY Islanders		Bernier	10,927	8–6–0	16	Recap
15	November 10	Ottawa	4–3	Colorado	OT	Varlamov	13,396	8–6–1	17	Recap
16	November 11	Colorado	3–4	Ottawa		Bernier	13,396	8–7–1	17	Recap
17	November 16	Washington	2–6	Colorado		Varlamov	15,070	9–7–1	19	Recap
18	November 18	Colorado	2–5	Nashville		Varlamov	17,113	9–8–1	19	Recap
19	November 19	Colorado	4–3	Detroit	OT	Bernier	19,515	10–8–1	21	Recap
20	November 22	Dallas	0–3	Colorado		Bernier	14,874	11–8–1	23	Recap
21	November 24	Colorado	2–3	Minnesota	SO	Bernier	19,084	11–8–2	24	Recap
22	November 25	Calgary	3–2	Colorado		Bernier	15,738	11–9–2	24	Recap
23	November 29	Winnipeg	2–3	Colorado	OT	Varlamov	13,017	12–9–2	26	Recap

December: 7–7–1 (Home: 4–5–0; Road: 3–2–1)
#	Date	Visitor	Score	Home	OT	Decision	Attendance	Record	Pts	Recap
24	December 1	New Jersey	2–1	Colorado		Varlamov	14,614	12–10–2	26	Recap
25	December 3	Dallas	7–2	Colorado		Bernier	13,194	12–11–2	26	Recap
26	December 5	Buffalo	4–2	Colorado		Varlamov	13,258	12–12–2	26	Recap
27	December 7	Colorado	2–5	Tampa Bay		Varlamov	19,092	12–13–2	26	Recap
28	December 9	Colorado	7–3	Florida		Varlamov	13,821	13–13–2	28	Recap
29	December 11	Colorado	2–1	Pittsburgh		Bernier	18,411	14–13–2	30	Recap
30	December 12	Colorado	2–5	Washington		Varlamov	18,506	14–14–2	30	Recap
31	December 14	Florida	1–2	Colorado		Varlamov	13,096	15–14–2	32	Recap
32	December 16	Tampa Bay	6–5	Colorado		Bernier	16,956	15–15–2	32	Recap
33	December 18	Pittsburgh	2–4	Colorado		Varlamov	15,824	16–15–2	34	Recap
34	December 21	Colorado	1–2	Los Angeles	OT	Varlamov	18,230	16–15–3	35	Recap
35	December 23	Colorado	6–2	Arizona		Varlamov	11,838	17–15–3	37	Recap
36	December 27	Arizona	3–1	Colorado		Varlamov	15,671	17–16–3	37	Recap
37	December 29	Toronto	3–4	Colorado	OT	Varlamov	18,013	18–16–3	39	Recap
38	December 31	NY Islanders	1–6	Colorado		Bernier	17,461	19–16–3	41	Recap

January: 8–2–1 (Home: 6–0–0; Road: 2–2–1)
#	Date	Visitor	Score	Home	OT	Decision	Attendance	Record	Pts	Recap
39	January 2	Winnipeg	2–3	Colorado	OT	Bernier	13,058	20–16–3	43	Recap
40	January 4	Columbus	0–2	Colorado		Bernier	13,763	21–16–3	45	Recap
41	January 6	Minnesota	2–7	Colorado		Bernier	18,046	22–16–3	47	Recap
42	January 13	Colorado	4–1	Dallas		Bernier	18,532	23–16–3	49	Recap
43	January 15	Anaheim	1–3	Colorado		Bernier	16,090	24–16–3	51	Recap
44	January 18	San Jose	3–5	Colorado		Bernier	14,349	25–16–3	53	Recap
45	January 20	NY Rangers	1–3	Colorado		Bernier	18,056	26–16–3	55	Recap
46	January 22	Colorado	4–2	Toronto		Bernier	18,979	27–16–3	57	Recap
47	January 23	Colorado	2–4	Montreal		Bernier	21,302	27–17–3	57	Recap
48	January 25	Colorado	1–3	St. Louis		Bernier	18,817	27–18–3	57	Recap
49	January 30	Colorado	3–4	Vancouver	OT	Bernier	18,257	27–18–4	58	Recap

February: 7–6–1 (Home: 4–1–0; Road: 3–5–1)
#	Date	Visitor	Score	Home	OT	Decision	Attendance	Record	Pts	Recap
50	February 1	Colorado	4–3	Edmonton	OT	Bernier	18,347	28–18–4	60	Recap
51	February 3	Colorado	0–3	Winnipeg		Varlamov	15,321	28–19–4	60	Recap
52	February 6	San Jose	1–3	Colorado		Bernier	13,349	29–19–4	62	Recap
53	February 8	Colorado	1–6	St. Louis		Bernier	18,951	29–20–4	62	Recap
54	February 10	Colorado	1–3	Carolina		Varlamov	15,589	29–21–4	62	Recap
55	February 11	Colorado	5–4	Buffalo		Bernier	17,646	30–21–4	64	Recap
56	February 14	Montreal	0–2	Colorado		Varlamov	14,928	31–21–4	66	Recap
57	February 16	Colorado	1–6	Winnipeg		Bernier	15,321	31–22–4	66	Recap
58	February 18	Edmonton	4–2	Colorado		Varlamov	18,076	31–23–4	66	Recap
59	February 20	Colorado	5–4	Vancouver	OT	Varlamov	18,107	32–23–4	68	Recap
60	February 22	Colorado	2–3	Edmonton	OT	Varlamov	18,347	32–23–5	69	Recap
61	February 24	Colorado	1–5	Calgary		Varlamov	19,201	32–24–5	69	Recap
62	February 26	Vancouver	1–3	Colorado		Varlamov	12,654	33–24–5	71	Recap
63	February 28	Calgary	2–5	Colorado		Varlamov	12,107	34–24–5	73	Recap

March: 8–4–3 (Home: 5–3–1; Road: 3–1–2)
#	Date	Visitor	Score	Home	OT	Decision	Attendance	Record	Pts	Recap
64	March 2	Minnesota	1–7	Colorado		Varlamov	17,325	35–24–5	75	Recap
65	March 4	Nashville	4–3	Colorado	OT	Varlamov	17,618	35–24–6	76	Recap
66	March 6	Colorado	1–2	Chicago	OT	Varlamov	21,508	35–24–7	77	Recap
67	March 8	Colorado	4–5	Columbus	OT	Varlamov	15,236	35–24–8	78	Recap
68	March 10	Arizona	2–5	Colorado		Bernier	17,127	36–24–8	80	Recap
69	March 13	Colorado	5–1	Minnesota		Varlamov	19,171	37–24–8	82	Recap
70	March 15	Colorado	4–1	St. Louis		Varlamov	18,885	38–24–8	84	Recap
71	March 16	Nashville	4–2	Colorado		Varlamov	17,273	38–25–8	84	Recap
72	March 18	Detroit	1–5	Colorado		Varlamov	18,032	39–25–8	86	Recap
73	March 20	Colorado	5–1	Chicago		Varlamov	21,633	40–25–8	88	Recap
74	March 22	Los Angeles	7–1	Colorado		Varlamov	17,071	40–26–8	88	Recap
75	March 24	Vegas	1–2	Colorado	SO	Varlamov	18,042	41–26–8	90	Recap
76	March 26	Colorado	1–4	Vegas		Varlamov	18,326	41–27–8	90	Recap
77	March 28	Philadelphia	2–1	Colorado		Hammond	16,320	41–28–8	90	Recap
78	March 30	Chicago	0–5	Colorado		Varlamov	17,985	42–28–8	92	Recap

April: 1–2–1 (Home: 1–0–0; Road: 0–2–1)
#	Date	Visitor	Score	Home	OT	Decision	Attendance	Record	Pts	Recap
79	April 1	Colorado	3–4	Anaheim	OT	Bernier	17,054	42–28–9	93	Recap
80	April 2	Colorado	1–3	Los Angeles		Bernier	18,230	42–29–9	93	Recap
81	April 5	Colorado	2–4	San Jose		Bernier	17,497	42–30–9	93	Recap
82	April 7	St. Louis	2–5	Colorado		Bernier	18,087	43–30–9	95	Recap

Legend: Win (2 points) Loss (0 points) Overtime/shootout loss (1 point)

=== Playoffs ===
2018 Stanley Cup playoffs

Western Conference First Round vs. (C1) Nashville Predators: Nashville won 4–2
#	Date	Visitor	Score	Home	OT	Decision	Attendance	Series	Recap
1	April 12	Colorado	2–5	Nashville		Bernier	17,301	0–1	Recap
2	April 14	Colorado	4–5	Nashville		Bernier	17,369	0–2	Recap
3	April 16	Nashville	3–5	Colorado		Bernier	18,087	1–2	Recap
4	April 18	Nashville	3–2	Colorado		Bernier	18,087	1–3	Recap
5	April 20	Colorado	2–1	Nashville		Hammond	17,504	2–3	Recap
6	April 22	Nashville	5–0	Colorado		Hammond	18,087	2–4	Recap

Legend: Win Loss

== Player statistics ==
Final Stats

=== Skaters ===
Regular season
Player	GP	G	A	Pts	+/−	PIM
Nathan MacKinnon	74	39	58	97	+11	55
Mikko Rantanen	81	29	55	84	0	34
Gabriel Landeskog	78	25	37	62	+16	37
Tyson Barrie	68	14	43	57	−15	22
Alexander Kerfoot	79	19	24	43	−7	28
Carl Soderberg	77	16	21	37	0	26
Blake Comeau	79	13	21	34	+5	50
Matt Nieto	74	15	11	26	+6	14
Erik Johnson	62	9	16	25	+3	58
J. T. Compher	69	13	10	23	−29	20
Tyson Jost	65	12	10	22	−10	26
Sven Andrighetto	50	8	14	22	−15	10
Nikita Zadorov	77	7	13	20	+4	103
Samuel Girard^{†}	68	3	17	20	−8	6
Colin Wilson	56	6	12	18	−5	6
Nail Yakupov	58	9	7	16	+2	26
Patrik Nemeth	68	3	12	15	+27	41
Mark Barberio	46	3	10	13	+6	31
Gabriel Bourque	58	5	6	11	−6	12
Matt Duchene^{‡}	14	4	6	10	+1	4
David Warsofsky	16	0	5	5	+4	0
Anton Lindholm	48	0	4	4	+4	14
Rocco Grimaldi	6	1	2	3	0	0
Andrei Mironov	10	1	2	3	+2	12
A. J. Greer	16	0	3	3	+2	22
Duncan Siemens	16	1	1	2	−5	23
Dominic Toninato	37	0	2	2	0	12
Chris Bigras^{‡}	15	0	1	1	−2	2
Mark Alt^{†}	7	0	0	0	−1	0
Vladislav Kamenev	3	0	0	0	−2	0

Playoffs
Player	GP	G	A	Pts	+/-	PIM
Gabriel Landeskog	6	4	3	7	−4	6
Nathan MacKinnon	6	3	3	6	−2	4
Tyson Barrie	6	0	4	4	−3	2
Mikko Rantanen	6	0	4	4	−1	0
Nikita Zadorov	6	1	2	3	+1	32
Matt Nieto	6	0	3	3	−1	2
J. T. Compher	6	0	3	3	−2	2
Blake Comeau	6	2	0	2	−3	2
Gabriel Bourque	6	2	0	2	+1	0
Alexander Kerfoot	6	2	0	2	−1	2
Carl Soderberg	6	0	2	2	−3	2
Sven Andrighetto	6	1	0	1	+1	6
Colin Wilson	6	0	1	1	−2	0
Mark Barberio	6	0	1	1	−1	6
Patrik Nemeth	6	0	1	1	−2	4
Tyson Jost	6	0	1	1	−2	0
Duncan Siemens	5	0	0	0	−4	0
David Warsofsky	4	0	0	0	+1	2
Samuel Girard	3	0	0	0	−3	0

=== Goaltenders ===
Regular season
Player	GP	GS	TOI	W	L	OT	GA	GAA	SA	SV%	SO	G	A	PIM
Andrew Hammond	2	1	58:47	0	1	0	2	2.04	33	.939	0	0	0	0
Semyon Varlamov	51	47	2860:40	24	16	6	128	2.68	1595	.920	2	0	0	0
Jonathan Bernier	37	34	2000:58	19	13	3	95	2.85	1092	.913	2	0	1	0

Playoffs
Player	GP	GS	TOI	W	L	GA	GAA	SA	SV%	SO	G	A	PIM
Andrew Hammond	3	2	137:29	1	1	6	2.98	90	.933	0	0	0	0
Jonathan Bernier	4	4	217:04	1	3	14	3.51	120	.883	0	0	0	0

^{†}Denotes player spent time with another team before joining the Avalanche. Stats reflect time with the Avalanche only.
^{‡}Traded mid-season
Bold/italics denotes franchise record

=== Suspensions/fines ===
Player	Explanation	Length	Salary	Date issued
Gabriel Landeskog	Cross–check against Calgary Flames forward Matthew Tkachuk during NHL Game No. 356 in Colorado on Saturday, November 25, 2017 at 15:18 of the first period.	4 games	$119,815.68	November 27, 2017
Erik Johnson	Boarding against Tampa Bay Lightning forward Vladislav Namestnikov during NHL Game No. 505 in Colorado on Saturday, December 16, 2017 at 16:57 of the second period.	2 games	$64,516.12	December 17, 2017

== Transactions ==
The Avalanche have been involved in the following transactions during the 2017–18 season.

=== Trades ===
Date	Details		Ref
July 1, 2017	To Nashville Predators 4th-round pick in 2019	To Colorado Avalanche Colin Wilson
November 5, 2017	To Ottawa Senators Matt Duchene	To Colorado Avalanche Kyle Turris; Shane Bowers; Andrew Hammond conditional 1st-round pick in 2018 or 2019; 3rd-round pick in 2019
November 5, 2017	To Nashville Predators Kyle Turris	To Colorado Avalanche Samuel Girard; Vladislav Kamenev; 2nd-round pick in 2018
February 26, 2018	To New York Rangers Chris Bigras	To Colorado Avalanche Ryan Graves

=== Free agents acquired ===
Date	Player	Former team	Contract terms (in U.S. dollars)	Ref
July 1, 2017	Andrew Agozzino	St. Louis Blues	2-year, $1.3 million	
July 1, 2017	Jonathan Bernier	Anaheim Ducks	1-year, $2.75 million	
July 1, 2017	David Warsofsky	Pittsburgh Penguins	2-year, $1.35 million	
July 4, 2017	Nail Yakupov	St. Louis Blues	1-year, $875,000	
July 26, 2017	Jesse Graham	New York Islanders	1-year, $650,000	
August 16, 2017	Dominic Toninato	Minnesota–Duluth Bulldogs	2-year, $1.85 million entry-level contract	
August 23, 2017	Alexander Kerfoot	Harvard Crimson	2-year, $1.85 million entry-level contract	
October 2, 2017	Ty Lewis	Brandon Wheat Kings	3-year, $2.2 million entry-level contract	
April 5, 2018	Josh Dickinson	Clarkson Golden Knights	3-year, $3.4125 million entry-level contract	
May 2, 2018	Pavel Francouz	Traktor Chelyabinsk	1-year, $690,000	

=== Free agents lost ===
Date	Player	New team	Contract terms (in U.S. dollars)	Ref
July 1, 2017	Turner Elson	Detroit Red Wings	1-year, $650,000	
July 1, 2017	Mike Sislo	Arizona Coyotes	1-year, $650,000	
July 1, 2017	Jeremy Smith	Carolina Hurricanes	1-year, $750,000	
July 1, 2017	Patrick Wiercioch	Vancouver Canucks	1-year, $650,000	
July 7, 2017	Mikhail Grigorenko	CSKA Moscow	3-year	
August 1, 2017	Brendan Ranford	San Antonio Rampage	Unknown	
August 4, 2017	Mat Clark	HC Bolzano	1-year	
August 21, 2017	Francois Beauchemin	Anaheim Ducks	1-year, $1 million	
August 29, 2017	Rene Bourque	Djurgårdens IF	1-year	
October 1, 2017	Eric Gelinas	Laval Rocket	1-year	
October 7, 2017	Cody Goloubef	Stockton Heat	Unknown	
March 17, 2018	Andrei Mironov	Dynamo Moscow	3-year	

=== Claimed via waivers ===
Player	New team	Date	Ref
Patrik Nemeth	Dallas Stars	October 3, 2017	
Mark Alt	Philadelphia Flyers	February 26, 2018	

=== Lost via waivers ===
Player	New team	Date	Ref

=== Players released ===
Date	Player	Via	Ref
March 2, 2018	Andrei Mironov	Contract termination	

=== Lost via retirement ===
Date	Player	Ref

=== Player signings ===
Date	Player	Contract terms (in U.S. dollars)	Ref
June 28, 2017	Sven Andrighetto	2-year, $2.8 million	
July 1, 2017	Joe Cannata	1-year, $650,000	
July 18, 2017	Gabriel Bourque	1-year, $750,000	
July 18, 2017	Felix Girard	1-year, $650,000	
July 18, 2017	Duncan Siemens	1-year, $750,000	
July 25, 2017	Matt Nieto	1-year, $1 million	
July 26, 2017	Rocco Grimaldi	1-year, $650,000	
September 15, 2017	Nikita Zadorov	2-year, $4.3 million	
March 2, 2018	Conor Timmins	3-year, $2.775 million entry-level contract	
March 29, 2018	Josh Anderson	3-year, $2.45 million entry-level contract	
March 29, 2018	Travis Barron	3-year, $2.225 entry-level contract	
May 8, 2018	Igor Shvyrev	3-year, $2.775 million entry-level contract	
May 10, 2018	Mark Alt	2-year, $1.45 million contract extension	
May 15, 2018	Mark Barberio	2-year, $2.9 million contract extension	
May 25, 2018	Gabriel Bourque	1-year, $950,000 contract extension	

== Draft picks ==
Below are the Colorado Avalanche's selections at the 2017 NHL entry draft, which was held on June 23 and 24, 2017 at the United Center in Chicago.

Round	#	Player	Pos	Nationality	College/Junior/Club team (League)
1	4	Cale Makar	D	Canada	Brooks Bandits (AJHL)
2	32	Conor Timmins	D	Canada	Sault Ste. Marie Greyhounds (OHL)
4	94	Nick Henry	RW	Canada	Regina Pats (WHL)
4	114^{1}	Petr Kvaca	G	Czech Republic	HC České Budějovice (Czech 1.liga)
5	125	Igor Shvyrev	C	Russia	Stalnye Lisy Magnitogorsk (MHL)
6	156	Denis Smirnov	LW	Russia	Pennsylvania State University (B1G)
7	187	Nicky Leivermann	D	United States	Eden Prairie High (USHS)

Draft notes

1. The New York Rangers' fourth-round pick went to the Colorado Avalanche as the result of a trade on June 25, 2016 that sent Nick Holden to New York in exchange for this pick.
