= 2017–18 Calgary Flames season =

NHL team season

2017–18 Calgary Flames
- Division: 5th Pacific
- Conference: 11th Western
- 2017–18 record: 37–35–10
- Home record: 17–20–4
- Road record: 20–15–6
- Goals for: 218
- Goals against: 248

Team information
- General manager: Brad Treliving
- Coach: Glen Gulutzan
- Captain: Mark Giordano
- Alternate captains: Troy Brouwer; Sean Monahan
- Arena: Scotiabank Saddledome
- Average attendance: 18,905
- Minor league affiliates: Stockton Heat (AHL); Kansas City Mavericks (ECHL)

Team leaders
- Goals: Sean Monahan (31)
- Assists: Johnny Gaudreau (60)
- Points: Johnny Gaudreau (84)
- Penalty minutes: Garnet Hathaway (88)
- Plus/minus: Micheal Ferland (+5)
- Wins: Mike Smith (25)
- Goals against average: Mike Smith (2.65)

The 2017–18 Calgary Flames season was their 38th season in Calgary, and the 46th season for the National Hockey League (NHL) franchise that was established on June 6, 1972. The Flames missed the playoffs for the seventh time in their last nine seasons.

== Standings ==
Pacific Division
Pos	Team	GP	W	L	OTL	ROW	GF	GA	GD	Pts
1	y – Vegas Golden Knights	82	51	24	7	47	272	228	+44	109
2	x – Anaheim Ducks	82	44	25	13	40	235	216	+19	101
3	x – San Jose Sharks	82	45	27	10	40	252	229	+23	100
4	x – Los Angeles Kings	82	45	29	8	43	239	203	+36	98
5	Calgary Flames	82	37	35	10	35	218	248	−30	84
6	Edmonton Oilers	82	36	40	6	31	234	263	−29	78
7	Vancouver Canucks	82	31	40	11	31	218	264	−46	73
8	Arizona Coyotes	82	29	41	12	27	208	256	−48	70

Source: National Hockey League
x – Clinched playoff spot; y – Clinched division

Western Conference Wild Card
Pos	Div	Team	GP	W	L	OTL	ROW	GF	GA	GD	Pts
1	PA	x – Los Angeles Kings	82	45	29	8	43	239	203	+36	98
2	CE	x – Colorado Avalanche	82	43	30	9	41	257	237	+20	95
3	CE	St. Louis Blues	82	44	32	6	41	226	222	+4	94
4	CE	Dallas Stars	82	42	32	8	38	235	225	+10	92
5	PA	Calgary Flames	82	37	35	10	35	218	248	−30	84
6	PA	Edmonton Oilers	82	36	40	6	31	234	263	−29	78
7	CE	Chicago Blackhawks	82	33	39	10	32	229	256	−27	76
8	PA	Vancouver Canucks	82	31	40	11	31	218	264	−46	73
9	PA	Arizona Coyotes	82	29	41	12	27	208	256	−48	70

Source: National Hockey League
x – Clinched playoff spot

== Schedule and results ==
=== Pre-season ===
The pre-season schedule was released on June 15, 2017. Before the start of pre-season games, the Flames' rookies and prospects participated in the annual Young Stars Classic tournament.

Pre-season game log

Young Stars Classic: 1–2–0
#	Date	Visitor	Score	Home	OT	Decision	Attendance	Record	Recap
1^{[a]}	September 8	Edmonton	4–2	Calgary		Parsons	–	0–1–0	Recap
2^{[a]}	September 10	Calgary	6–2	Vancouver		Schneider	–	1–1–0	Recap
3^{[a]}	September 11	Winnipeg	4–1	Calgary		McDonald	–	1–2–0	Recap
^{[a]} Young Stars Classic tournament at South Okanagan Events Centre in Penticton, British Columbia

2017 pre-season game log: 2–5–0 (Home: 2–2–0; Road: 0–3–0)
#	Date	Visitor	Score	Home	OT	Decision	Attendance	Record	Recap
1^{[A]}	September 18	Calgary	2–5	Edmonton		Lack	18,347	0–1–0	Recap
2^{[A]}	September 18	Edmonton	5–4	Calgary		Gillies	–	0–2–0	Recap
3	September 20	Vancouver	5–3	Calgary		Gillies	18,232	0–3–0	Recap
4	September 22	Arizona	2–4	Calgary		Smith	18,961	1–3–0	Recap
5	September 25	Calgary	2–5	Winnipeg		Lack	15,294	1–4–0	Recap
6	September 28	Calgary	1–3	Vancouver		Smith	14,712	1–5–0	Recap
7	September 30	Winnipeg	2–3	Calgary	SO	Smith	19,289	2–5–0	Recap
Notes:^{A} Indicates split-squad.

=== Regular season ===
The regular season schedule was published on June 22, 2017.

2017–18 game log

October: 6–6–0 (Home: 2–4–0; Road: 4–2–0)
#	Date	Visitor	Score	Home	OT	Decision	Attendance	Record	Pts	Recap
1	October 4	Calgary	0–3	Edmonton		Smith	18,347	0–1–0	0	Recap
2	October 7	Winnipeg	3–6	Calgary		Smith	19,289	1–1–0	2	Recap
3	October 9	Calgary	2–0	Anaheim		Smith	15,485	2–1–0	4	Recap
4	October 11	Calgary	4–3	Los Angeles	OT	Smith	18,230	3–1–0	6	Recap
5	October 13	Ottawa	6–0	Calgary		Smith	19,289	3–2–0	6	Recap
6	October 14	Calgary	5–2	Vancouver		Smith	17,074	4–2–0	8	Recap
7	October 19	Carolina	2–1	Calgary		Smith	18,119	4–3–0	8	Recap
8	October 21	Minnesota	4–2	Calgary		Smith	18,436	4–4–0	8	Recap
9	October 24	Calgary	3–2	Nashville	SO	Smith	17,113	5–4–0	10	Recap
10	October 25	Calgary	2–5	St. Louis		Lack	17,227	5–5–0	10	Recap
11	October 27	Dallas	2–1	Calgary		Smith	18,873	5–6–0	10	Recap
12	October 29	Washington	1–2	Calgary		Smith	18,327	6–6–0	12	Recap

November: 8–4–1 (Home: 5–2–0; Road: 3–2–1)
#	Date	Visitor	Score	Home	OT	Decision	Attendance	Record	Pts	Recap
13	November 2	Pittsburgh	1–2	Calgary	OT	Smith	18,837	7–6–0	14	Recap
14	November 5	New Jersey	4–5	Calgary	SO	Smith	17,839	8–6–0	16	Recap
15	November 7	Vancouver	5–3	Calgary		Smith	18,160	8–7–0	16	Recap
16	November 9	Detroit	3–6	Calgary		Smith	18,788	9–7–0	18	Recap
17	November 13	St. Louis	4–7	Calgary		Lack	18,519	10–7–0	20	Recap
18	November 15	Calgary	2–8	Detroit		Lack	19,515	10–8–0	20	Recap
19	November 18	Calgary	5–4	Philadelphia	OT	Smith	19,210	11–8–0	22	Recap
20	November 20	Calgary	4–1	Washington		Smith	18,506	12–8–0	24	Recap
21	November 22	Calgary	0–1	Columbus	OT	Smith	16,290	12–8–1	25	Recap
22	November 24	Calgary	4–6	Dallas		Smith	18,532	12–9–1	25	Recap
23	November 25	Calgary	3–2	Colorado		Rittich	15,738	13–9–1	27	Recap
24	November 28	Toronto	4–1	Calgary		Smith	19,289	13–10–1	27	Recap
25	November 30	Arizona	0–3	Calgary		Smith	18,093	14–10–1	29	Recap

December: 5–6–3 (Home: 3–5–0; Road: 2–1–3)
#	Date	Visitor	Score	Home	OT	Decision	Attendance	Record	Pts	Recap
26	December 2	Edmonton	7–5	Calgary		Rittich	19,289	14–11–1	29	Recap
27	December 4	Philadelphia	5–2	Calgary		Smith	18,590	14–12–1	29	Recap
28	December 6	Calgary	1–2	Toronto	SO	Smith	19,217	14–12–2	30	Recap
29	December 7	Calgary	3–2	Montreal	OT	Rittich	21,302	15–12–2	32	Recap
30	December 9	Vancouver	2–4	Calgary		Smith	18,552	16–12–2	34	Recap
31	December 12	Calgary	1–2	Minnesota	SO	Smith	18,767	16–12–3	35	Recap
32	December 14	San Jose	3–2	Calgary		Smith	18,730	16–13–3	35	Recap
33	December 16	Nashville	2–0	Calgary		Smith	18,618	16–14–3	35	Recap
34	December 17	Calgary	6–1	Vancouver		Rittich	18,236	17–14–3	37	Recap
35	December 20	St. Louis	1–2	Calgary		Smith	18,410	18–14–3	39	Recap
36	December 22	Montreal	3–2	Calgary		Smith	19,289	18–15–3	39	Recap
37	December 28	Calgary	2–3	San Jose	SO	Rittich	17,562	18–15–4	40	Recap
38	December 29	Calgary	1–2	Anaheim		Smith	17,174	18–16–4	40	Recap
39	December 31	Chicago	3–4	Calgary	OT	Smith	19,289	19–16–4	42	Recap

January: 6–1–4 (Home: 2–1–3; Road: 4–0–1)
#	Date	Visitor	Score	Home	OT	Decision	Attendance	Record	Pts	Recap
40	January 4	Los Angeles	3–4	Calgary		Smith	19,206	20–16–4	44	Recap
41	January 6	Anaheim	2–3	Calgary		Smith	19,258	21–16–4	46	Recap
42	January 9	Calgary	3–2	Minnesota	OT	Smith	19,011	22–16–4	48	Recap
43	January 11	Calgary	5–1	Tampa Bay		Smith	19,092	23–16–4	50	Recap
44	January 12	Calgary	4–2	Florida		Rittich	14,519	24–16–4	52	Recap
45	January 14	Calgary	4–1	Carolina		Smith	15,218	25–16–4	54	Recap
46	January 20	Winnipeg	2–1	Calgary	SO	Smith	19,289	25–16–5	55	Recap
47	January 22	Buffalo	2–1	Calgary	OT	Smith	18,349	25–16–6	56	Recap
48	January 24	Los Angeles	2–1	Calgary	OT	Smith	19,004	25–16–7	57	Recap
49	January 25	Calgary	3–4	Edmonton	SO	Rittich	18,347	25–16–8	58	Recap
January 27–29		All-Star Break in Tampa, Florida
50	January 30	Vegas	4–2	Calgary		Smith	19,289	25–17–8	58	Recap

February: 7–7–1 (Home: 2–2–1; Road: 5–5–0)
#	Date	Visitor	Score	Home	OT	Decision	Attendance	Record	Pts	Recap
51	February 1	Tampa Bay	7–4	Calgary		Smith	19,000	25–18–8	58	Recap
52	February 3	Chicago	3–4	Calgary	OT	Smith	19,289	26–18–8	60	Recap
53	February 6	Calgary	3–2	Chicago		Smith	21,480	27–18–8	62	Recap
54	February 8	Calgary	3–2	New Jersey		Rittich	13,085	28–18–8	64	Recap
55	February 9	Calgary	3–4	NY Rangers		Smith	18,006	28–19–8	64	Recap
56	February 11	Calgary	3–2	NY Islanders		Smith	11,192	29–19–8	66	Recap
57	February 13	Calgary	2–5	Boston		Rittich	17,565	29–20–8	66	Recap
58	February 15	Calgary	4–3	Nashville		Rittich	17,326	30–20–8	68	Recap
59	February 17	Florida	6–3	Calgary		Rittich	19,289	30–21–8	68	Recap
60	February 19	Boston	2–1	Calgary	OT	Rittich	19,289	30–21–9	69	Recap
61	February 21	Calgary	3–7	Vegas		Rittich	18,014	30–22–9	69	Recap
62	February 22	Calgary	5–2	Arizona		Gillies	11,904	31–22–9	71	Recap
63	February 24	Colorado	1–5	Calgary		Gillies	19,201	32–22–9	73	Recap
64	February 27	Calgary	0–2	Dallas		Gillies	17,124	32–23–9	73	Recap
65	February 28	Calgary	2–5	Colorado		Rittich	12,107	32–24–9	73	Recap

March: 4–9–1 (Home: 2–5–0; Road: 2–4–1)
#	Date	Visitor	Score	Home	OT	Decision	Attendance	Record	Pts	Recap
66	March 2	NY Rangers	3–1	Calgary		Gillies	19,143	32–25–9	73	Recap
67	March 5	Calgary	3–4	Pittsburgh	OT	Gillies	18,630	32–25–10	74	Recap
68	March 7	Calgary	5–1	Buffalo		Rittich	17,773	33–25–10	76	Recap
69	March 9	Calgary	2–1	Ottawa		Rittich	14,498	34–25–10	78	Recap
70	March 11	NY Islanders	5–2	Calgary		Smith	19,108	34–26–10	78	Recap
71	March 13	Edmonton	0–1	Calgary		Smith	19,289	35–26–10	80	Recap
72	March 16	San Jose	7–4	Calgary		Smith	19,196	35–27–10	80	Recap
73	March 18	Calgary	0–4	Vegas		Smith	18,075	35–28–10	80	Recap
74	March 19	Calgary	2–5	Arizona		Smith	13,288	35–29–10	80	Recap
75	March 21	Anaheim	4–0	Calgary		Smith	19,059	35–30–10	80	Recap
76	March 24	Calgary	1–5	San Jose		Rittich	17,562	35–31–10	80	Recap
77	March 26	Calgary	0–3	Los Angeles		Smith	18,230	35–32–10	80	Recap
78	March 29	Columbus	5–1	Calgary		Gillies	18,967	35–33–10	80	Recap
79	March 31	Edmonton	2–3	Calgary		Smith	19,289	36–33–10	82	Recap

April: 1–2–0 (Home: 1–1–0; Road: 0–1–0)
#	Date	Visitor	Score	Home	OT	Decision	Attendance	Record	Pts	Recap
80	April 3	Arizona	4–1	Calgary		Gillies	18,677	36–34–10	82	Recap
81	April 5	Calgary	1–2	Winnipeg		Gillies	15,321	36–35–10	82	Recap
82	April 7	Vegas	1–7	Calgary		Gillies	19,289	37–35–10	84	Recap

Legend: Win (2 points) Loss (0 points) Overtime/shootout loss (1 point)

== Player statistics ==
Final Stats

=== Skaters ===
Regular season
Player	GP	G	A	Pts	+/−	PIM
Johnny Gaudreau	80	24	60	84	2	26
Sean Monahan	74	31	33	64	3	24
Matthew Tkachuk	68	24	25	49	−1	61
Mikael Backlund	82	14	31	45	−21	78
Dougie Hamilton	82	17	27	44	1	64
Micheal Ferland	77	21	20	41	5	24
Mark Giordano	82	13	25	38	0	63
T. J. Brodie	73	4	28	32	−16	18
Sam Bennett	82	11	15	26	−18	59
Mark Jankowski	72	17	8	25	−7	33
Michael Frolik	70	10	15	25	−19	26
Troy Brouwer	76	6	16	22	−7	53
Garnet Hathaway	59	4	9	13	3	88
Matt Stajan	68	4	8	12	4	28
Curtis Lazar	65	2	10	12	−8	23
Travis Hamonic	74	1	10	11	−9	79
Michael Stone	82	3	7	10	−11	28
Kris Versteeg	24	3	5	8	−8	6
Brett Kulak	71	2	6	8	−3	27
Jaromir Jagr	22	1	6	7	6	10
Chris Stewart^{†}	7	1	2	3	−4	0
Nick Shore^{†}	9	1	2	3	0	4
Matt Bartkowski	18	0	3	3	−3	4
Spencer Foo	4	2	0	2	1	0
Freddie Hamilton^{‡}	8	0	1	1	−1	2
Ryan Lomberg	7	0	1	1	0	15
Rasmus Andersson	10	0	0	0	−1	4
Tanner Glass	16	0	0	0	−4	19
Marek Hrivik	3	0	0	0	1	0
Morgan Klimchuk	1	0	0	0	0	0
Andrew Mangiapane	10	0	0	0	−3	2

=== Goaltenders ===
Regular season
Player	GP	GS	TOI	W	L	OT	GA	GAA	SA	SV%	SO	G	A	PIM
Mike Smith	55	55	3,190:36	25	21	6	141	2.65	1,686	.916	3	0	2	8
David Rittich	21	16	978:14	8	6	3	49	2.92	512	.904	0	0	0	14
Jon Gillies	11	9	604:56	3	5	1	29	2.88	280	.896	0	0	0	2
Eddie Lack^{‡}	4	2	136:12	1	2	0	12	5.29	64	.813	0	0	0	0

^{†}Denotes player spent time with another team before joining the Flames. Stats reflect time with the Flames only.
^{‡}Traded mid-season
Bold/italics denotes franchise record

== Awards and honours ==
=== Milestones ===
Regular season
Player	Milestone	Reached	Ref
Mark Giordano	100th career NHL goal	October 14, 2017	
Mike Smith	200th career NHL win	October 24, 2017	
Mark Jankowski	1st career NHL goal 1st career NHL point	November 9, 2017	
Mikael Backlund	100th career NHL goal	November 25, 2017	
David Rittich	1st career NHL win	November 25, 2017	
Dougie Hamilton	400th career NHL game 1st career NHL hat-trick	February 17, 2018	
Morgan Klimchuk	1st career NHL game	February 19, 2018	
Johnny Gaudreau	300th career NHL game	March 7, 2018	
Matt Stajan	1,000th career NHL game	March 21, 2018	
Spencer Foo	1st career NHL game	March 31, 2018	
Spencer Foo	1st career NHL goal 1st career NHL point	April 5, 2018	
Mark Jankowski	1st career NHL hat-trick	April 8, 2018	

== Transactions ==
=== Player signings ===
Date	Player	Contract terms (in U.S. dollars)	Ref
June 29, 2017	Kris Versteeg	1-year, $1.75 million	
June 30, 2017	Michael Stone	3-year, $10.5 million	
July 13, 2017	Micheal Ferland	2-year, $3.5 million	
July 14, 2017	Curtis Lazar	2-year, $1.9 million	
July 20, 2017	Garnet Hathaway	1-year, $650,000	
July 21, 2017	Juuso Valimaki	3-year, $4.05 million entry-level contract	
July 22, 2017	Jon Gillies	1-year, $725,000	
July 22, 2017	David Rittich	1-year, $725,000	
August 29, 2017	Brett Kulak	1-year, $650,000	
September 5, 2017	Tyler Wotherspoon	1-year, $650,000	
September 6, 2017	Sam Bennett	2-year, $3.9 million	
November 16, 2017	Glenn Gawdin	3-year, $2.775 million entry-level contract	
December 31, 2017	Matthew Phillips	3-year, $2.275 million entry-level contract	
February 16, 2018	Mikael Backlund	6-year, $32.1 million contract extension	

=== Trades ===
June 24, 2017	To Calgary Flames Travis Hamonic conditional 4th round pick	To New York Islanders 1st round pick in 2018; 2nd round pick in 2018 conditional 2nd round pick
June 29, 2017	To Calgary Flames Eddie Lack; Ryan Murphy; 7th round pick in 2019	To Carolina Hurricanes Keegan Kanzig; 6th round pick in 2019
July 1, 2017	To Calgary Flames conditional 7th round pick in 2018	To Detroit Red Wings Tom McCollum
December 30, 2017	To Calgary Flames Dalton Prout	To New Jersey Devils Eddie Lack
February 26, 2018	To Calgary Flames Nick Shore	To Ottawa Senators 7th-round pick in 2019

=== Additions and subtractions ===
Additions
Player	Former team	Via
Spencer Foo	Union Dutchmen (ECAC)	Free agency
Marek Hrivik	New York Rangers	Free agency
Luke Gazdic	New Jersey Devils	Free agency
Tanner Glass	New York Rangers	Free agency
Jaromir Jagr	Florida Panthers	Free agency
Cody Goloubef	Stockton Heat (AHL)	Free agency
Yasin Ehliz	Thomas Sabo Ice Tigers (DEL)	Free agency
Marcus Hogstrom	Djurgårdens IF (SHL)	Free agency

Subtractions
Player	New team	Via
Brandon Bollig	San Jose Sharks	Free agency
Lance Bouma	Chicago Blackhawks	Free agency
Alex Chiasson	Washington Capitals	Free agency
Ryan Culkin	Tucson Roadrunners (AHL)	Free agency
Brian Elliott	Philadelphia Flyers	Free agency
Deryk Engelland	Vegas Golden Knights	Expansion Draft
Michael Kostka	Skellefteå AIK (SHL)	Free agency
Kenney Morrison	Chicago Wolves (AHL)	Free agency
Ryan Murphy	Minnesota Wild	Free agency
Linden Vey	Barys Astana (KHL)	Free agency

== Draft picks ==
Below are the Calgary Flames' selections at the 2017 NHL entry draft, which was held on June 23 and 24, 2017 at the United Center in Chicago.

Round	#	Player	Pos	Nationality	College/Junior/Club team (League)
1	16	Juuso Valimaki	D	Finland	Tri-City Americans (WHL)
4	109	Adam Ruzicka	C	Slovakia	Sarnia Sting (OHL)
5	140	Zach Fisher	RW	Canada	Medicine Hat Tigers (WHL)
6	171	D'Artagnan Joly	RW	Canada	Baie-Comeau Drakkar (QMJHL)
7	202	Filip Sveningsson	LW	Sweden	HV71 (J20 SuperElit)
