= 2017–18 Detroit Red Wings season =

Sports season

2017–18 Detroit Red Wings
- Division: 5th Atlantic
- Conference: 13th Eastern
- 2017–18 record: 30–39–13
- Home record: 16–16–9
- Road record: 14–23–4
- Goals for: 217
- Goals against: 255

Team information
- General manager: Ken Holland
- Coach: Jeff Blashill
- Captain: Henrik Zetterberg
- Alternate captains: Justin Abdelkader; Niklas Kronwall
- Arena: Little Caesars Arena
- Average attendance: 19,515
- Minor league affiliates: Grand Rapids Griffins (AHL); Toledo Walleye (ECHL)

Team leaders
- Goals: Anthony Mantha (24)
- Assists: Dylan Larkin (47)
- Points: Dylan Larkin (63)
- Penalty minutes: Justin Abdelkader (78)
- Plus/minus: Joe Hicketts (+5)
- Wins: Jimmy Howard (22)
- Goals against average: Jimmy Howard (2.85)

The 2017–18 Detroit Red Wings season was the 92nd season for the National Hockey League (NHL) franchise that was established on September 25, 1926. It was also the Red Wings' first season at Little Caesars Arena. The team missed the playoffs for the second year in a row, marking the first time since the 1981–82 season and the 1982–83 season that the Red Wings missed the playoffs in consecutive seasons.

== Standings ==
Atlantic Division
| Pos | Team | GP | W | L | OTL | ROW | GF | GA | GD | Pts |
|---|---|---|---|---|---|---|---|---|---|---|
| 1 | z – Tampa Bay Lightning | 82 | 54 | 23 | 5 | 48 | 296 | 236 | +60 | 113 |
| 2 | x – Boston Bruins | 82 | 50 | 20 | 12 | 47 | 270 | 214 | +56 | 112 |
| 3 | x – Toronto Maple Leafs | 82 | 49 | 26 | 7 | 42 | 277 | 232 | +45 | 105 |
| 4 | Florida Panthers | 82 | 44 | 30 | 8 | 41 | 248 | 246 | +2 | 96 |
| 5 | Detroit Red Wings | 82 | 30 | 39 | 13 | 25 | 217 | 255 | −38 | 73 |
| 6 | Montreal Canadiens | 82 | 29 | 40 | 13 | 27 | 209 | 264 | −55 | 71 |
| 7 | Ottawa Senators | 82 | 28 | 43 | 11 | 26 | 221 | 291 | −70 | 67 |
| 8 | Buffalo Sabres | 82 | 25 | 45 | 12 | 24 | 199 | 280 | −81 | 62 |

Source: National Hockey League
x – Clinched playoff spot; z – Clinched conference

Eastern Conference Wild Card
| Pos | Div | Team | GP | W | L | OTL | ROW | GF | GA | GD | Pts |
|---|---|---|---|---|---|---|---|---|---|---|---|
| 1 | ME | x – Columbus Blue Jackets | 82 | 45 | 30 | 7 | 39 | 242 | 230 | +12 | 97 |
| 2 | ME | x – New Jersey Devils | 82 | 44 | 29 | 9 | 39 | 248 | 244 | +4 | 97 |
| 3 | AT | Florida Panthers | 82 | 44 | 30 | 8 | 41 | 248 | 246 | +2 | 96 |
| 4 | ME | Carolina Hurricanes | 82 | 36 | 35 | 11 | 33 | 228 | 256 | −28 | 83 |
| 5 | ME | New York Islanders | 82 | 35 | 37 | 10 | 32 | 264 | 296 | −32 | 80 |
| 6 | ME | New York Rangers | 82 | 34 | 39 | 9 | 31 | 231 | 268 | −37 | 77 |
| 7 | AT | Detroit Red Wings | 82 | 30 | 39 | 13 | 25 | 217 | 255 | −38 | 73 |
| 8 | AT | Montreal Canadiens | 82 | 29 | 40 | 13 | 27 | 209 | 264 | −55 | 71 |
| 9 | AT | Ottawa Senators | 82 | 28 | 43 | 11 | 26 | 221 | 291 | −70 | 67 |
| 10 | AT | Buffalo Sabres | 82 | 25 | 45 | 12 | 24 | 199 | 280 | −81 | 62 |

Source: National Hockey League
x – Clinched playoff spot

== Schedule and results ==
=== Preseason ===
2017 preseason game log: 3–4–1 (Home: 2–2–0; Road: 1–2–1)
| # | Date | Visitor | Score | Home | OT | Decision | Attendance | Record | Recap |
|---|---|---|---|---|---|---|---|---|---|
| 1 | September 19 | Detroit | 2–4 | Boston | | Mrazek | 16,309 | 0–1–0 | Recap |
| 2 | September 20 | Detroit | 5–6 | Pittsburgh | OT | McCollum | 17,784 | 0–1–1 | Recap |
| 3 | September 21 | Detroit | 1–6 | Chicago | | Mrazek | 20,342 | 0–2–1 | Recap |
| 4 | September 23 | Boston | 1–5 | Detroit | | Howard | 17,314 | 1–2–1 | Recap |
| 5 | September 25 | Pittsburgh | 1–4 | Detroit | | Howard | 16,770 | 2–2–1 | Recap |
| 6 | September 28 | Chicago | 4–2 | Detroit | | Mrazek | 17,089 | 2–3–1 | Recap |
| 7 | September 29 | Toronto | 4–2 | Detroit | | Howard | 17,746 | 2–4–1 | Recap |
| 8 | September 30 | Detroit | 3–2 | Toronto | SO | Coreau | — | 3–4–1 | Recap |

=== Regular season ===
2017–18 game log: 30–39–13 (Home: 16–16–9; Road: 14–23–4)

October: 6–6–1 (Home: 2–2–1; Road: 4–4–0)
| # | Date | Visitor | Score | Home | OT | Decision | Attendance | Record | Pts | Recap |
|---|---|---|---|---|---|---|---|---|---|---|
| 1 | October 5 | Minnesota | 2–4 | Detroit | | Howard | 19,515 | 1–0–0 | 2 | Recap |
| 2 | October 7 | Detroit | 2–1 | Ottawa | SO | Howard | 14,883 | 2–0–0 | 4 | Recap |
| 3 | October 10 | Detroit | 2–4 | Dallas | | Mrazek | 18,119 | 2–1–0 | 4 | Recap |
| 4 | October 12 | Detroit | 4–2 | Arizona | | Howard | 13,584 | 3–1–0 | 6 | Recap |
| 5 | October 13 | Detroit | 6–3 | Vegas | | Mrazek | 17,645 | 4–1–0 | 8 | Recap |
| 6 | October 16 | Tampa Bay | 3–2 | Detroit | | Howard | 19,515 | 4–2–0 | 8 | Recap |
| 7 | October 18 | Detroit | 3–6 | Toronto | | Mrazek | 19,158 | 4–3–0 | 8 | Recap |
| 8 | October 20 | Washington | 4–3 | Detroit | OT | Mrazek | 19,515 | 4–3–1 | 9 | Recap |
| 9 | October 22 | Vancouver | 4–1 | Detroit | | Howard | 19,515 | 4–4–1 | 9 | Recap |
| 10 | October 24 | Detroit | 0–1 | Buffalo | | Howard | 16,882 | 4–5–1 | 9 | Recap |
| 11 | October 26 | Detroit | 2–3 | Tampa Bay | | Howard | 19,092 | 4–6–1 | 9 | Recap |
| 12 | October 28 | Detroit | 3–2 | Florida | SO | Howard | 13,085 | 5–6–1 | 11 | Recap |
| 13 | October 31 | Arizona | 3–5 | Detroit | | Howard | 19,515 | 6–6–1 | 13 | Recap |

November: 4–5–4 (Home: 2–3–3; Road: 2–2–1)
| # | Date | Visitor | Score | Home | OT | Decision | Attendance | Record | Pts | Recap |
|---|---|---|---|---|---|---|---|---|---|---|
| 14 | November 2 | Detroit | 1–3 | Ottawa | | Howard | 14,724 | 6–7–1 | 13 | Recap |
| 15 | November 5 | Detroit | 4–0 | Edmonton | | Mrazek | 18,347 | 7–7–1 | 15 | Recap |
| 16 | November 6 | Detroit | 3–2 | Vancouver | | Howard | 17,836 | 8–7–1 | 17 | Recap |
| 17 | November 9 | Detroit | 3–6 | Calgary | | Mrazek | 18,788 | 8–8–1 | 17 | Recap |
| 18 | November 11 | Columbus | 2–1 | Detroit | SO | Howard | 19,515 | 8–8–2 | 18 | Recap |
| 19 | November 15 | Calgary | 2–8 | Detroit | | Howard | 19,515 | 9–8–2 | 20 | Recap |
| 20 | November 17 | Buffalo | 1–3 | Detroit | | Howard | 19,515 | 10–8–2 | 22 | Recap |
| 21 | November 19 | Colorado | 4–3 | Detroit | OT | Howard | 19,515 | 10–8–3 | 23 | Recap |
| 22 | November 22 | Edmonton | 6–2 | Detroit | | Howard | 19,515 | 10–9–3 | 23 | Recap |
| 23 | November 24 | Detroit | 1–2 | NY Rangers | OT | Howard | 18,006 | 10–9–4 | 24 | Recap |
| 24 | November 25 | New Jersey | 4–3 | Detroit | OT | Howard | 19,515 | 10–9–5 | 25 | Recap |
| 25 | November 28 | Los Angeles | 4–1 | Detroit | | Howard | 19,515 | 10–10–5 | 25 | Recap |
| 26 | November 30 | Montreal | 6–3 | Detroit | | Howard | 19,515 | 10–11–5 | 25 | Recap |

December: 5–5–2 (Home: 4–1–2; Road: 1–4–0)
| # | Date | Visitor | Score | Home | OT | Decision | Attendance | Record | Pts | Recap |
|---|---|---|---|---|---|---|---|---|---|---|
| 27 | December 2 | Detroit | 1–10 | Montreal | | Mrazek | 21,302 | 10–12–5 | 25 | Recap |
| 28 | December 5 | Winnipeg | 1–5 | Detroit | | Howard | 19,515 | 11–12–5 | 27 | Recap |
| 29 | December 9 | St. Louis | 6–1 | Detroit | | Howard | 19,515 | 11–13–5 | 27 | Recap |
| 30 | December 11 | Florida | 2–1 | Detroit | OT | Howard | 19,515 | 11–13–6 | 28 | Recap |
| 31 | December 13 | Boston | 3–2 | Detroit | OT | Howard | 19,515 | 11–13–7 | 29 | Recap |
| 32 | December 15 | Toronto | 1–3 | Detroit | | Howard | 19,515 | 12–13–7 | 31 | Recap |
| 33 | December 19 | Detroit | 6–3 | NY Islanders | | Mrazek | 10,511 | 13–13–7 | 33 | Recap |
| 34 | December 20 | Detroit | 3–4 | Philadelphia | | Howard | 19,674 | 13–14–7 | 33 | Recap |
| 35 | December 23 | Detroit | 1–3 | Boston | | Howard | 17,565 | 13–15–7 | 33 | Recap |
| 36 | December 27 | Detroit | 1–3 | New Jersey | | Howard | 16,514 | 13–16–7 | 33 | Recap |
| 37 | December 29 | NY Rangers | 2–3 | Detroit | SO | Howard | 19,515 | 14–16–7 | 35 | Recap |
| 38 | December 31 | Pittsburgh | 1–4 | Detroit | | Howard | 19,515 | 15–16–7 | 37 | Recap |

January: 5–5–1 (Home: 3–4–1; Road: 2–1–0)
| # | Date | Visitor | Score | Home | OT | Decision | Attendance | Record | Pts | Recap |
|---|---|---|---|---|---|---|---|---|---|---|
| 39 | January 3 | Ottawa | 1–2 | Detroit | OT | Howard | 19,515 | 16–16–7 | 39 | Recap |
| 40 | January 5 | Florida | 2–4 | Detroit | | Howard | 19,515 | 17–16–7 | 41 | Recap |
| 41 | January 7 | Tampa Bay | 5–2 | Detroit | | Mrazek | 19,515 | 17–17–7 | 41 | Recap |
| 42 | January 13 | Detroit | 1–4 | Pittsburgh | | Howard | 18,637 | 17–18–7 | 41 | Recap |
| 43 | January 14 | Detroit | 4–0 | Chicago | | Mrazek | 21,830 | 18–18–7 | 43 | Recap |
| 44 | January 16 | Dallas | 4–2 | Detroit | | Howard | 19,515 | 18–19–7 | 43 | Recap |
| 45 | January 20 | Carolina | 3–1 | Detroit | | Howard | 19,515 | 18–20–7 | 43 | Recap |
| 46 | January 22 | Detroit | 3–0 | New Jersey | | Mrazek | 13,847 | 19–20–7 | 45 | Recap |
| 47 | January 23 | Philadelphia | 3–2 | Detroit | OT | Mrazek | 19,515 | 19–20–8 | 46 | Recap |
| 48 | January 25 | Chicago | 5–1 | Detroit | | Howard | 19,515 | 19–21–8 | 46 | Recap |
All-Star Break in Tampa
| 49 | January 31 | San Jose | 1–2 | Detroit | SO | Mrazek | 19,515 | 20–21–8 | 48 | Recap |

February: 6–6–2 (Home: 2–3–1; Road: 4–3–1)
| # | Date | Visitor | Score | Home | OT | Decision | Attendance | Record | Pts | Recap |
|---|---|---|---|---|---|---|---|---|---|---|
| 50 | February 2 | Detroit | 4–1 | Carolina | | Mrazek | 18,126 | 21–21–8 | 50 | Recap |
| 51 | February 3 | Detroit | 2–3 | Florida | | Mrazek | 17,987 | 21–22–8 | 50 | Recap |
| 52 | February 6 | Boston | 3–2 | Detroit | | Howard | 19,515 | 21–23–8 | 50 | Recap |
| 53 | February 9 | Detroit | 6–7 | NY Islanders | OT | Mrazek | 11,847 | 21–23–9 | 51 | Recap |
| 54 | February 11 | Detroit | 5–4 | Washington | OT | Howard | 18,506 | 22–23–9 | 53 | Recap |
| 55 | February 13 | Anaheim | 1–2 | Detroit | | Howard | 19,515 | 23–23–9 | 55 | Recap |
| 56 | February 15 | Detroit | 1–4 | Tampa Bay | | Howard | 19,092 | 23–24–9 | 55 | Recap |
| 57 | February 17 | Detroit | 3–1 | Nashville | | Mrazek | 17,561 | 24–24–9 | 57 | Recap |
| 58 | February 18 | Toronto | 3–2 | Detroit | | Mrazek | 19,515 | 24–25–9 | 57 | Recap |
| 59 | February 20 | Nashville | 3–2 | Detroit | | Howard | 19,515 | 24–26–9 | 57 | Recap |
| 60 | February 22 | Buffalo | 3–2 | Detroit | OT | Howard | 19,515 | 24–26–10 | 58 | Recap |
| 61 | February 24 | Carolina | 1–3 | Detroit | | Howard | 19,515 | 25–26–10 | 60 | Recap |
| 62 | February 25 | Detroit | 3–2 | NY Rangers | OT | Howard | 18,006 | 26–26–10 | 62 | Recap |
| 63 | February 28 | Detroit | 1–2 | St. Louis | | Howard | 18,813 | 26–27–10 | 62 | Recap |

March: 4–11–1 (Home: 3–2–0; Road: 1–9–1)
| # | Date | Visitor | Score | Home | OT | Decision | Attendance | Record | Pts | Recap |
|---|---|---|---|---|---|---|---|---|---|---|
| 64 | March 2 | Detroit | 3–4 | Winnipeg | | Howard | 15,321 | 26–28–10 | 62 | Recap |
| 65 | March 4 | Detroit | 1–4 | Minnesota | | Howard | 19,037 | 26–29–10 | 62 | Recap |
| 66 | March 6 | Detroit | 5–6 | Boston | OT | Howard | 17,565 | 26–29–11 | 63 | Recap |
| 67 | March 8 | Vegas | 4–0 | Detroit | | Howard | 19,515 | 26–30–11 | 63 | Recap |
| 68 | March 9 | Detroit | 2–3 | Columbus | | Coreau | 17,284 | 26–31–11 | 63 | Recap |
| 69 | March 12 | Detroit | 3–5 | San Jose | | Howard | 17,199 | 26–32–11 | 63 | Recap |
| 70 | March 15 | Detroit | 1–4 | Los Angeles | | Coreau | 18,230 | 26–33–11 | 63 | Recap |
| 71 | March 16 | Detroit | 2–4 | Anaheim | | Howard | 17,243 | 26–34–11 | 63 | Recap |
| 72 | March 18 | Detroit | 1–5 | Colorado | | Coreau | 18,032 | 26–35–11 | 63 | Recap |
| 73 | March 20 | Philadelphia | 4–5 | Detroit | SO | Howard | 19,515 | 27–35–11 | 65 | Recap |
| 74 | March 22 | Washington | 1–0 | Detroit | | Howard | 19,515 | 27–36–11 | 65 | Recap |
| 75 | March 24 | Detroit | 3–4 | Toronto | | Howard | 19,154 | 27–37–11 | 65 | Recap |
| 76 | March 26 | Detroit | 2–4 | Montreal | | Coreau | 21,302 | 27–38–11 | 65 | Recap |
| 77 | March 27 | Pittsburgh | 2–5 | Detroit | | Howard | 19,515 | 28–38–11 | 67 | Recap |
| 78 | March 29 | Detroit | 6–3 | Buffalo | | Howard | 18,493 | 29–38–11 | 69 | Recap |
| 79 | March 31 | Ottawa | 0–2 | Detroit | | Howard | 19,515 | 30–38–11 | 71 | Recap |

April: 0–1–2 (Home: 0–1–1; Road: 0–0–1)
| # | Date | Visitor | Score | Home | OT | Decision | Attendance | Record | Pts | Recap |
|---|---|---|---|---|---|---|---|---|---|---|
| 80 | April 3 | Detroit | 4–5 | Columbus | OT | Howard | 18,477 | 30–38–12 | 72 | Recap |
| 81 | April 5 | Montreal | 4–3 | Detroit | | Coreau | 19,515 | 30–39–12 | 72 | Recap |
| 82 | April 7 | NY Islanders | 4–3 | Detroit | OT | Coreau | 19,515 | 30–39–13 | 73 | Recap |

Legend: Win (2 points) Loss (0 points) Overtime/shootout loss (1 point)

== Player statistics ==
=== Skaters ===
Regular season
| Player | GP | G | A | Pts | +/− | PIM |
|---|---|---|---|---|---|---|
| Dylan Larkin | 82 | 16 | 47 | 63 | −9 | 61 |
| Henrik Zetterberg | 82 | 11 | 45 | 56 | 1 | 14 |
| Anthony Mantha | 80 | 24 | 24 | 48 | −1 | 52 |
| Gustav Nyquist | 82 | 21 | 19 | 40 | −2 | 20 |
| Justin Abdelkader | 75 | 13 | 22 | 35 | −11 | 78 |
| Frans Nielsen | 79 | 16 | 17 | 33 | 1 | 14 |
| Andreas Athanasiou | 71 | 16 | 17 | 33 | −15 | 16 |
| Mike Green | 66 | 8 | 25 | 33 | −14 | 38 |
| Darren Helm | 75 | 13 | 18 | 31 | 3 | 39 |
| Tomas Tatar^{‡} | 62 | 16 | 12 | 28 | −8 | 24 |
| Niklas Kronwall | 79 | 4 | 23 | 27 | −14 | 36 |
| Martin Frk | 68 | 11 | 14 | 25 | −14 | 14 |
| Tyler Bertuzzi | 48 | 7 | 17 | 24 | −7 | 39 |
| Luke Glendening | 69 | 11 | 8 | 19 | −14 | 17 |
| Trevor Daley | 77 | 9 | 7 | 16 | −5 | 36 |
| Nick Jensen | 81 | 0 | 15 | 15 | −8 | 27 |
| Jonathan Ericsson | 81 | 3 | 10 | 13 | −7 | 47 |
| Danny DeKeyser | 65 | 6 | 6 | 12 | 2 | 28 |
| Xavier Ouellet | 45 | 0 | 7 | 7 | −3 | 6 |
| David Booth | 28 | 4 | 1 | 5 | −5 | 10 |
| Evgeny Svechnikov | 14 | 2 | 2 | 4 | −2 | 8 |
| Luke Witkowski | 31 | 1 | 3 | 4 | −1 | 68 |
| Joe Hicketts | 5 | 0 | 3 | 3 | 5 | 0 |
| Scott Wilson^{†‡} | 17 | 0 | 0 | 0 | −1 | 0 |
| Dominic Turgeon | 3 | 0 | 0 | 0 | −1 | 2 |

=== Goaltenders ===
Regular season
| Player | GP | GS | TOI | W | L | OT | GA | GAA | SA | SV% | SO | G | A | PIM |
|---|---|---|---|---|---|---|---|---|---|---|---|---|---|---|
| Jimmy Howard | 60 | 57 | 3,368 | 22 | 27 | 9 | 160 | 2.85 | 1,770 | .910 | 0 | 0 | 0 | 6 |
| Petr Mrazek^{‡} | 22 | 18 | 1,184 | 8 | 7 | 3 | 57 | 2.89 | 573 | .910 | 3 | 0 | 0 | 0 |
| Jared Coreau | 7 | 7 | 381 | 0 | 5 | 1 | 27 | 4.26 | 176 | .867 | 0 | 0 | 0 | 0 |

^{†}Denotes player spent time with another team before joining the Red Wings. Stats reflect time with the Red Wings only.
^{‡}Traded mid-season
Bold/italics denotes franchise record

== Awards and honours ==
=== Milestones ===
Regular season
| Player | Milestone | Reached |
|---|---|---|
| Martin Frk | 1st career NHL goal 1st career NHL assist 1st career NHL point | October 5, 2017 |
| Mike Green | 300th career NHL assist | October 5, 2017 |
| Jimmy Howard | 200th career NHL win | October 5, 2017 |
| Xavier Ouellet | 100th career NHL game | October 12, 2017 |
| Trevor Daley | 900th career NHL game | October 16, 2017 |
| Luke Glendening | 300th career NHL game | October 16, 2017 |
| Darren Helm | 500th career NHL game | October 18, 2017 |
| Tomas Tatar | 100th career NHL goal | October 18, 2017 |
| Niklas Kronwall | 800th career NHL game | October 20, 2017 |
| Frans Nielsen | 700th career NHL game | November 5, 2017 |
| Tomas Tatar | 200th career NHL point | November 6, 2017 |
| Frans Nielsen | 400th career NHL point | November 28, 2017 |
| Dylan Larkin | 100th career NHL point | December 2, 2017 |
| Anthony Mantha | 100th career NHL game | December 11, 2017 |
| Tyler Bertuzzi | 1st career NHL assist 1st career NHL point | December 27, 2017 |
| Gustav Nyquist | 100th career NHL goal | December 31, 2017 |
| Dylan Larkin | 200th career NHL game | January 5, 2018 |
| Henrik Zetterberg | 600th career NHL assist | January 5, 2018 |
| Dominic Turgeon | 1st career NHL game | January 14, 2018 |
| Tyler Bertuzzi | 1st career NHL goal | January 14, 2018 |
| Joe Hicketts | 1st career NHL game | January 22, 2018 |
| Tomas Tatar | 400th career NHL game | February 13, 2018 |
| Luke Witkowski | 1st career NHL goal | February 17, 2018 |
| Henrik Zetterberg | 100th career NHL power-play goal | February 24, 2018 |
| Evgeny Svechnikov | 1st career NHL goal 1st career NHL point | March 20, 2018 |
| Joe Hicketts | 1st career NHL assist 1st career NHL point | March 27, 2018 |
| Niklas Kronwall | 400th career NHL point | March 27, 2018 |
| Evgeny Svechnikov | 1st career NHL assist | March 29, 2018 |
| Justin Abdelkader | 100th career NHL goal | April 7, 2018 |

== Suspensions/fines ==
| Player | Explanation | Length | Salary | Date issued |
|---|---|---|---|---|
| Luke Witkowski | Returning to the ice to take part in an altercation after being escorted off by an official | 10 games | $40,322.58 | November 16, 2017 |
| Justin Abdelkader | Spearing New York Islanders defenseman Scott Mayfield in New York on Tuesday, December 19, 2017, at 19:17 of the first period. | — | $5,000.00 | December 20, 2017 |

== Transactions ==
=== Trades ===
| Date | Details | | Ref |
|---|---|---|---|
| July 1, 2017 | To Calgary Flames Conditional 7th-round pick in 2018 | To Detroit Red Wings Tom McCollum |
| October 21, 2017 | To New York Rangers Ryan Sproul | To Detroit Red Wings Matt Puempel |
| October 21, 2017 | To Pittsburgh Penguins Riley Sheahan; 5th-round pick in 2018 | To Detroit Red Wings Scott Wilson; 3rd-round pick in 2018 |
| December 4, 2017 | To Buffalo Sabres Scott Wilson | To Detroit Red Wings 5th-round pick in 2019 |
| February 19, 2018 | To Philadelphia Flyers Petr Mrazek^{[a]} | To Detroit Red Wings Conditional 4th-round pick in 2018; Conditional 3rd-round pick in 2019 |
| February 26, 2018 | To Vegas Golden Knights Tomas Tatar | To Detroit Red Wings 1st-round pick in 2018; 2nd-round pick in 2019; 3rd-round pick in 2021 |

Notes:

- ^{a} Detroit to retain 50% ($2 million) of salary as part of trade.

=== Free agents acquired ===
| Date | Player | Former team | Contract terms (in U.S. dollars) | Ref |
|---|---|---|---|---|
| July 1, 2017 | Trevor Daley | Pittsburgh Penguins | 3-year, $9.53 million | |
| July 1, 2017 | Luke Witkowski | Tampa Bay Lightning | 2-year, $1.5 million | |
| July 1, 2017 | Turner Elson | San Antonio Rampage | 1-year, $650,000 | |
| October 2, 2017 | David Booth | Avangard Omsk | 1-year, $700,000 | |
| October 3, 2017 | Kaden Fulcher | Hamilton Bulldogs | 3-year, $2.15 million entry-level contract | |
| May 21, 2018 | Patrik Rybar | Mountfield HK | 1-year, $925,000 entry-level contract | |

=== Free agents lost ===
| Date | Player | New team | Contract terms (in U.S. dollars) | Ref |
|---|---|---|---|---|
| July 1, 2017 | Mitch Callahan | Edmonton Oilers | 2-year, $1.4 million | |
| July 1, 2017 | Edward Pasquale | Edmonton Oilers | 1-year, $700,000 | |
| July 26, 2017 | Jake Paterson | Milwaukee Admirals | 2-year, $1.4 million | |
| May 1, 2018 | Matej Machovsky | Sparta Praha | 3-year | |
| June 18, 2018 | Turner Elson | Grand Rapids Griffins | 1-year | |

=== Player signings ===
| Date | Player | Contract terms (in U.S. dollars) | Ref |
|---|---|---|---|
| June 27, 2017 | Ben Street | 1-year, $650,000 contract extension | |
| June 29, 2017 | Brian Lashoff | 2-year, $1.3 million contract extension | |
| June 29, 2017 | Dylan McIlrath | 2-year, $1.3 million contract extension | |
| July 3, 2017 | Xavier Ouellet | 2-year, $2.5 million contract extension | |
| July 18, 2017 | Martin Frk | 1-year, $650,000 contract extension | |
| July 21, 2017 | Tomas Tatar | 4-year, $21.2 million contract extension | |
| August 5, 2017 | Michael Rasmussen | 3-year, $2.775 million entry-level contract | |
| September 5, 2017 | Robbie Russo | 2-year, $1.3 million contract extension | |
| October 21, 2017 | Andreas Athanasiou | 1-year, $1.3875 million contract extension | |
| May 7, 2018 | David Pope | 2-year, $2.875 million entry-level contract | |
| May 25, 2018 | Gustav Lindstrom | 3-year, $2.775 million entry-level contract | |

== Draft picks ==
Below are the Detroit Red Wings' selections at the 2017 NHL entry draft, which was held on June 23–24, 2017 at the United Center in Chicago, Illinois.

| Round | # | Player | Pos | Nationality | College/Junior/Club team (League) |
|---|---|---|---|---|---|
| 1 | 9 | Michael Rasmussen | C | Canada | Tri-City Americans (WHL) |
| 2 | 38 | Gustav Lindstrom | D | Sweden | Almtuna IS (Allsvenskan) |
| 3 | 71^{1} | Kasper Kotkansalo | D | Finland | Sioux Falls Stampede (USHL) |
| 3 | 79^{2} | Lane Zablocki | C | Canada | Red Deer Rebels (WHL) |
| 3 | 83^{3} | Zach Gallant | C | Canada | Peterborough Petes (OHL) |
| 3 | 88^{4} | Keith Petruzzelli | G | United States | Muskegon Lumberjacks (USHL) |
| 4 | 100 | Malte Setkov | D | Denmark | Malmö Redhawks (J20 SuperElit) |
| 5 | 131 | Cole Fraser | D | Canada | Peterborough Petes (OHL) |
| 6 | 162 | John Adams | RW | United States | Fargo Force (USHL) |
| 6 | 164^{5} | Reilly Webb | D | Canada | Hamilton Bulldogs (OHL) |
| 7 | 193 | Brady Gilmour | C | Canada | Saginaw Spirit (OHL) |

Draft notes

1. The Florida Panthers' third-round pick went to the Detroit Red Wings as the result of a trade on March 1, 2017 that sent Thomas Vanek to Florida in exchange for Dylan McIlrath and this pick (being conditional at the time of the trade). The condition – Detroit will receive a third-round pick in 2017 if Florida fails to qualify for the 2017 Stanley Cup playoffs – was converted on March 30, 2017.
2. The Toronto Maple Leafs' third-round pick went to the Detroit Red Wings as compensation for Toronto hiring Mike Babcock as their head coach on May 20, 2015.
3. The New York Rangers' third-round pick went to the Detroit Red Wings as the result of a trade on February 28, 2017 that sent Brendan Smith to New York in exchange for Ottawa's second-round pick in 2018 and this pick.
4. The Chicago Blackhawks' third-round pick went to the Detroit Red Wings as the result of a trade on February 24, 2017 that sent Tomas Jurco to Chicago in exchange for this pick.
5. The Florida Panthers' sixth-round pick went to the Detroit Red Wings as the result of a trade on February 27, 2016 that sent Jakub Kindl to Florida in exchange for this pick.
