= 2017–18 Columbus Blue Jackets season =

National Hockey League season

2017–18 Columbus Blue Jackets
- Division: 4th Metropolitan
- Conference: 7th Eastern
- 2017–18 record: 45–30–7
- Home record: 26–12–3
- Road record: 19–18–4
- Goals for: 242
- Goals against: 230

Team information
- General manager: Jarmo Kekäläinen
- Coach: John Tortorella
- Captain: Nick Foligno
- Alternate captains: Brandon Dubinsky (Oct.–Jan.); Boone Jenner; Jack Johnson
- Arena: Nationwide Arena
- Average attendance: 16,659
- Minor league affiliate: Cleveland Monsters (AHL)

Team leaders
- Goals: Artemi Panarin (27)
- Assists: Artemi Panarin (55)
- Points: Artemi Panarin (82)
- Penalty minutes: Nick Foligno (50)
- Plus/minus: Artemi Panarin (+23)
- Wins: Sergei Bobrovsky (37)
- Goals against average: Sergei Bobrovsky (2.42)

The 2017–18 Columbus Blue Jackets season was the 18th season for the National Hockey League (NHL) franchise that was established on June 25, 1997.

== Standings ==
Metropolitan Division
Pos	Team	GP	W	L	OTL	ROW	GF	GA	GD	Pts
1	y – Washington Capitals	82	49	26	7	46	259	239	+20	105
2	x – Pittsburgh Penguins	82	47	29	6	45	272	250	+22	100
3	x – Philadelphia Flyers	82	42	26	14	40	251	243	+8	98
4	x – Columbus Blue Jackets	82	45	30	7	39	242	230	+12	97
5	x – New Jersey Devils	82	44	29	9	39	248	244	+4	97
6	Carolina Hurricanes	82	36	35	11	33	228	256	−28	83
7	New York Islanders	82	35	37	10	32	264	296	−32	80
8	New York Rangers	82	34	39	9	31	231	268	−37	77

Source: National Hockey League
x – Clinched playoff spot; y – Clinched division

Eastern Conference Wild Card
Pos	Div	Team	GP	W	L	OTL	ROW	GF	GA	GD	Pts
1	ME	x – Columbus Blue Jackets	82	45	30	7	39	242	230	+12	97
2	ME	x – New Jersey Devils	82	44	29	9	39	248	244	+4	97
3	AT	Florida Panthers	82	44	30	8	41	248	246	+2	96
4	ME	Carolina Hurricanes	82	36	35	11	33	228	256	−28	83
5	ME	New York Islanders	82	35	37	10	32	264	296	−32	80
6	ME	New York Rangers	82	34	39	9	31	231	268	−37	77
7	AT	Detroit Red Wings	82	30	39	13	25	217	255	−38	73
8	AT	Montreal Canadiens	82	29	40	13	27	209	264	−55	71
9	AT	Ottawa Senators	82	28	43	11	26	221	291	−70	67
10	AT	Buffalo Sabres	82	25	45	12	24	199	280	−81	62

Source: National Hockey League
x – Clinched playoff spot

== Schedule and results ==
=== Preseason ===
The preseason schedule was published on June 19, 2017.

2017 preseason game log: 4–3–1 (home: 1–3–0; road: 3–0–1)
#	Date	Visitor	Score	Home	OT	Decision	Attendance	Record	Recap
1	September 19	Chicago	5–2	Columbus		Korpisalo	10,548	0–1–0	Recap
2	September 20	Columbus	2–3	St. Louis	OT	Kulbakov	9,648	0–1–1	Recap
3	September 22	Pittsburgh	4–3	Columbus		Kivlenieks	12,115	0–2–1	Recap
4	September 23	Columbus	3–2	Chicago		Korpisalo	20,395	1–2–1	Recap
5	September 24	Nashville	5–3	Columbus		Bobrovsky	12,044	1–3–1	Recap
6	September 26	St. Louis	2–5	Columbus		Korpisalo	9,757	2–3–1	Recap
7	September 28	Columbus	4–3	Nashville	SO	Bobrovsky	16,052	3–3–1	Recap
8	September 30	Columbus	3–0	Pittsburgh		Bobrovsky	18,338	4–3–1	Recap

=== Regular season ===
The regular season schedule was released on June 22, 2017.

2017–18 game log

October: 8–4–0 (home: 5–2–0; road: 3–2–0)
#	Date	Visitor	Score	Home	OT	Decision	Attendance	Record	Pts	Recap
1	October 6	NY Islanders	0–5	Columbus		Bobrovsky	18,595	1–0–0	2	Recap
2	October 7	Columbus	1–5	Chicago		Korpisalo	21,264	1–1–0	2	Recap
3	October 10	Columbus	2–1	Carolina	OT	Bobrovsky	7,892	2–1–0	4	Recap
4	October 13	NY Rangers	1–3	Columbus		Bobrovsky	15,342	3–1–0	6	Recap
5	October 14	Columbus	5–4	Minnesota	OT	Bobrovsky	19,064	4–1–0	8	Recap
6	October 17	Columbus	5–2	Winnipeg		Korpisalo	15,321	5–1–0	10	Recap
7	October 19	Tampa Bay	2–0	Columbus		Bobrovsky	13,155	5–2–0	10	Recap
8	October 21	Los Angeles	6–4	Columbus		Bobrovsky	15,329	5–3–0	10	Recap
9	October 25	Buffalo	1–5	Columbus		Bobrovsky	14,383	6–3–0	12	Recap
10	October 27	Winnipeg	1–2	Columbus	OT	Bobrovsky	14,224	7–3–0	14	Recap
11	October 28	Columbus	1–4	St. Louis		Korpisalo	17,834	7–4–0	14	Recap
12	October 30	Boston	3–4	Columbus	SO	Bobrovsky	13,396	8–4–0	16	Recap

November: 8–4–1 (home: 4–2–0; road: 4–2–1)
#	Date	Visitor	Score	Home	OT	Decision	Attendance	Record	Pts	Recap
13	November 2	Columbus	7–3	Florida		Bobrovsky	9,311	9–4–0	18	Recap
14	November 4	Columbus	4–5	Tampa Bay	SO	Bobrovsky	19,092	9–4–1	19	Recap
15	November 6	Columbus	3–5	NY Rangers		Bobrovsky	17,348	9–5–1	19	Recap
16	November 7	Nashville	3–1	Columbus		Korpisalo	14,996	9–6–1	19	Recap
17	November 10	Carolina	3–1	Columbus		Bobrovsky	16,049	9–7–1	19	Recap
18	November 11	Columbus	2–1	Detroit	SO	Bobrovsky	19,515	10–7–1	21	Recap
19	November 14	Columbus	2–1	Montreal	OT	Bobrovsky	21,302	11–7–1	23	Recap
20	November 17	NY Rangers	0–2	Columbus		Bobrovsky	17,093	12–7–1	25	Recap
21	November 20	Columbus	3–2	Buffalo		Bobrovsky	16,551	13–7–1	27	Recap
22	November 22	Calgary	0–1	Columbus	OT	Bobrovsky	16,290	14–7–1	29	Recap
23	November 24	Ottawa	2–5	Columbus		Bobrovsky	17,084	15–7–1	31	Recap
24	November 27	Columbus	1–3	Montreal		Bobrovsky	21,302	15–8–1	31	Recap
25	November 28	Carolina	2–3	Columbus	SO	Korpisalo	13,947	16–8–1	33	Recap

December: 6–7–2 (home: 5–3–0; road: 1–4–2)
#	Date	Visitor	Score	Home	OT	Decision	Attendance	Record	Pts	Recap
26	December 1	Anaheim	2–4	Columbus		Korpisalo	16,206	17–8–1	35	Recap
27	December 2	Columbus	3–4	Washington		Bobrovsky	18,506	17–9–1	35	Recap
28	December 5	New Jersey	4–1	Columbus		Bobrovsky	14,282	17–8–1	35	Recap
29	December 8	Columbus	5–3	New Jersey		Bobrovsky	16,514	18–10–1	37	Recap
30	December 9	Arizona	0–1	Columbus		Bobrovsky	17,785	19–10–1	39	Recap
31	December 12	Edmonton	7–2	Columbus		Bobrovsky	14,767	19–11–1	39	Recap
32	December 14	NY Islanders	4–6	Columbus		Bobrovsky	15,696	20–11–1	41	Recap
33	December 16	Columbus	1–2	Carolina		Bobrovsky	11,357	20–12–1	41	Recap
34	December 18	Columbus	2–7	Boston		Bobrovsky	17,565	20–13–1	41	Recap
35	December 20	Toronto	2–4	Columbus		Korpisalo	17,708	21–13–1	43	Recap
36	December 21	Columbus	2–3	Pittsburgh	SO	Bobrovsky	18,625	21–13–2	44	Recap
37	December 23	Philadelphia	1–2	Columbus	SO	Bobrovsky	17,812	22–13–2	46	Recap
38	December 27	Columbus	4–5	Pittsburgh	SO	Bobrovsky	18,652	22–13–3	47	Recap
39	December 29	Columbus	4–5	Ottawa		Bobrovsky	17,031	22–14–3	47	Recap
40	December 31	Tampa Bay	5–0	Columbus		Korpisalo	18,878	22–15–3	47	Recap

January: 5–4–1 (home: 2–1–1; road: 3–3–0)
#	Date	Visitor	Score	Home	OT	Decision	Attendance	Record	Pts	Recap
41	January 2	Columbus	2–1	Dallas		Bobrovsky	17,235	23–15–3	49	Recap
42	January 4	Columbus	0–2	Colorado		Bobrovsky	13,763	23–16–3	49	Recap
43	January 7	Florida	2–3	Columbus	SO	Bobrovsky	16,535	24–16–3	51	Recap
44	January 8	Columbus	3–2	Toronto	OT	Bobrovsky	18,933	25–16–3	53	Recap
45	January 11	Columbus	1–3	Buffalo		Bobrovsky	18,071	25–17–3	53	Recap
46	January 12	Vancouver	5–2	Columbus		Bobrovsky	16,705	25–18–3	53	Recap
47	January 18	Dallas	1–2	Columbus	SO	Korpisalo	17,574	26–18–3	55	Recap
48	January 23	Columbus	3–6	Vegas		Bobrovsky	18,231	26–19–3	55	Recap
49	January 25	Columbus	2–1	Arizona		Bobrovsky	12,281	27–19–3	57	Recap
50	January 30	Minnesota	3–2	Columbus	SO	Bobrovsky	17,734	27–19–4	58	Recap

February: 5–7–1 (home: 3–3–1; road: 2–4–0)
#	Date	Visitor	Score	Home	OT	Decision	Attendance	Record	Pts	Recap
51	February 2	San Jose	3–1	Columbus		Bobrovsky	16,867	27–20–4	58	Recap
52	February 3	Columbus	3–4	NY Islanders		Korpisalo	13,597	27–21–4	58	Recap
53	February 6	Washington	3–2	Columbus		Bobrovsky	16,419	27–22–4	58	Recap
54	February 9	Columbus	2–4	Washington		Bobrovsky	18,506	27–23–4	58	Recap
55	February 10	New Jersey	1–6	Columbus		Bobrovsky	18,510	28–23–4	60	Recap
56	February 13	Columbus	4–1	NY Islanders		Bobrovsky	10,232	29–23–4	62	Recap
57	February 14	Columbus	3–6	Toronto		Korpisalo	18,890	29–24–4	62	Recap
58	February 16	Philadelphia	2–1	Columbus	OT	Bobrovsky	17,364	29–24–5	63	Recap
59	February 18	Pittsburgh	5–2	Columbus		Bobrovsky	19,100	29–25–5	63	Recap
60	February 20	Columbus	2–1	New Jersey		Bobrovsky	14,024	30–25–5	65	Recap
61	February 22	Columbus	1–2	Philadelphia		Bobrovsky	19,727	30–26–5	65	Recap
62	February 24	Chicago	2–3	Columbus		Bobrovsky	18,792	31–26–5	67	Recap
63	February 26	Washington	1–5	Columbus		Bobrovsky	17,386	32–26–5	69	Recap

March: 12–3–1 (home: 6–1–0; road: 6–2–1)
#	Date	Visitor	Score	Home	OT	Decision	Attendance	Record	Pts	Recap
64	March 1	Columbus	2–5	Los Angeles		Korpisalo	18,230	32–27–5	69	Recap
65	March 2	Columbus	2–4	Anaheim		Bobrovsky	16,447	32–28–5	69	Recap
66	March 4	Columbus	4–2	San Jose		Bobrovsky	17,211	33–28–5	71	Recap
67	March 6	Vegas	1–4	Columbus		Korpisalo	17,402	34–28–5	73	Recap
68	March 8	Colorado	4–5	Columbus	OT	Korpisalo	15,236	35–28–5	75	Recap
69	March 9	Detroit	2–3	Columbus		Bobrovsky	17,284	36–28–5	77	Recap
70	March 12	Montreal	2–5	Columbus		Bobrovsky	15,864	37–28–5	79	Recap
71	March 15	Columbus	5–3	Philadelphia		Bobrovsky	19,354	38–28–5	81	Recap
72	March 17	Ottawa	1–2	Columbus		Bobrovsky	17,612	39–28–5	83	Recap
73	March 19	Columbus	5–4	Boston	OT	Korpisalo	17,565	40–28–5	85	Recap
74	March 20	Columbus	5–3	NY Rangers		Bobrovsky	17,194	41–28–5	87	Recap
75	March 22	Florida	0–4	Columbus		Bobrovsky	16,919	42–28–5	89	Recap
76	March 24	St. Louis	2–1	Columbus		Bobrovsky	19,080	42–29–5	89	Recap
77	March 27	Columbus	7–3	Edmonton		Bobrovsky	18,347	43–29–5	91	Recap
78	March 29	Columbus	5–1	Calgary		Bobrovsky	18,967	44–29–5	93	Recap
79	March 31	Columbus	4–5	Vancouver	OT	Korpisalo	18,865	44–29–6	94	Recap

April: 1–1–1 (home: 1–0–1; road: 0–1–0)
#	Date	Visitor	Score	Home	OT	Decision	Attendance	Record	Pts	Recap
80	April 3	Detroit	4–5	Columbus	OT	Bobrovsky	18,477	45–29–6	96	Recap
81	April 5	Pittsburgh	5–4	Columbus	OT	Bobrovsky	19,157	45–29–7	97	Recap
82	April 7	Columbus	2–4	Nashville		Korpisalo	17,594	45–30–7	97	Recap

Legend: Win (2 points) Loss (0 points) Overtime/shootout loss (1 point)

=== Playoffs ===
2018 Stanley Cup playoffs

Eastern Conference first round vs. (M1) Washington Capitals: Washington won 4–2
#	Date	Visitor	Score	Home	OT	Decision	Attendance	Series	Recap
1	April 12	Columbus	4–3	Washington	OT	Bobrovsky	18,506	1–0	Recap
2	April 15	Columbus	5–4	Washington	OT	Bobrovsky	18,506	2–0	Recap
3	April 17	Washington	3–2	Columbus	2OT	Bobrovsky	19,337	2–1	Recap
4	April 19	Washington	4–1	Columbus		Bobrovsky	19,395	2–2	Recap
5	April 21	Columbus	3–4	Washington	OT	Bobrovsky	18,506	2–3	Recap
6	April 23	Washington	6–3	Columbus		Bobrovsky	18,667	2–4	Recap

Legend: Win Loss

== Player statistics ==
As of April 23, 2018

Skaters

Regular season
Player	GP	G	A	Pts	+/−	PIM
Artemi Panarin	81	27	55	82	23	26
Seth Jones	78	16	41	57	10	30
Pierre-Luc Dubois	82	20	28	48	8	49
Cam Atkinson	65	24	22	46	19	14
Oliver Bjorkstrand	82	11	29	40	4	9
Zach Werenski	77	16	21	37	8	16
Alexander Wennberg	66	8	27	35	22	12
Nick Foligno	72	15	18	33	1	50
Boone Jenner	75	13	19	32	1	39
Josh Anderson	63	19	11	30	−1	42
Matt Calvert	69	9	15	24	−10	33
Markus Nutivaara	61	7	16	23	13	14
Sonny Milano	55	14	8	22	−8	10
Brandon Dubinsky	62	6	10	16	−2	33
David Savard	81	4	12	16	2	32
Thomas Vanek^{†}	19	7	8	15	9	8
Ryan Murray	44	1	11	12	4	8
Jack Johnson	77	3	8	11	−6	22
Lukas Sedlak	53	4	4	8	−3	21
Ian Cole^{†}	20	2	5	7	11	24
Markus Hannikainen	33	3	3	6	−1	6
Tyler Motte^{‡}	31	3	2	5	−3	2
Scott Harrington	32	2	3	5	0	8
Mark Letestu^{†}	20	1	3	4	0	0
Dean Kukan	11	0	4	4	2	2
Jordan Schroeder	21	1	1	2	−4	4
Gabriel Carlsson	14	0	2	2	0	4
Jussi Jokinen^{†‡}	14	0	1	1	−2	4
Nathan Gerbe	2	0	0	0	−1	0
Alex Broadhurst	2	0	0	0	0	2
Eric Robinson	1	0	0	0	1	0
Zac Dalpe	12	0	0	0	−3	13
Taylor Chorney^{†}	1	0	0	0	2	0

Playoffs
Player	GP	G	A	Pts	+/−	PIM
Artemi Panarin	6	2	5	7	−4	6
Seth Jones	6	1	4	5	−3	4
Matt Calvert	6	3	1	4	4	4
Cam Atkinson	6	2	2	4	−3	2
Pierre-Luc Dubois	6	2	2	4	0	6
Nick Foligno	6	2	1	3	−4	4
Josh Anderson	6	1	2	3	3	21
Boone Jenner	6	1	2	3	−3	4
Oliver Bjorkstrand	6	1	2	3	0	0
Zach Werenski	6	1	2	3	0	2
Ian Cole	6	0	3	3	−1	2
Thomas Vanek	6	1	1	2	−1	2
Alexander Wennberg	3	1	1	2	−1	0
Ryan Murray	6	0	1	1	3	2
David Savard	6	0	0	0	0	0
Sonny Milano	3	0	0	0	0	0
Mark Letestu	6	0	0	0	−1	0
Brandon Dubinsky	6	0	0	0	1	6
Markus Nutivaara	6	0	0	0	2	0

Goaltenders

Regular season
Player	GP	GS	TOI	W	L	OT	GA	GAA	SA	SV%	SO	G	A	PIM
Sergei Bobrovsky	65	65	3,911:34	37	22	6	158	2.42	1,993	.921	5	0	3	0
Joonas Korpisalo	18	17	1,048:49	8	8	1	58	3.32	564	.897	0	0	0	0

Playoffs
Player	GP	GS	TOI	W	L	GA	GAA	SA	SV%	SO	G	A	PIM
Sergei Bobrovsky	6	6	415:27	2	4	22	3.18	221	.900	0	0	0	0

^{†}Denotes player spent time with another team before joining the Blue Jackets. Statistics reflect time with the Blue Jackets only.
^{‡}Denotes player was traded mid-season. Statistics reflect time with the Blue Jackets only.
Bold/italics denotes franchise record.

== Transactions ==
The Blue Jackets have been involved in the following transactions during the 2017–18 season.

=== Trades ===
Date	Details		Ref
June 21, 2017	To Vegas Golden Knights David Clarkson; 1st round pick in 2017; 2nd round pick in 2019	To Columbus Blue Jackets Expansion Draft considerations^{[a]}
June 23, 2017	To Chicago Blackhawks Brandon Saad; Anton Forsberg; 5th round pick in 2018	To Columbus Blue Jackets Artemi Panarin; Tyler Motte; 6th round pick in 2017
June 23, 2017	To Minnesota Wild Dante Salituro	To Columbus Blue Jackets Jordan Schroeder
June 24, 2017	To Vegas Golden Knights Keegan Kolesar	To Columbus Blue Jackets TBL's 2nd round pick in 2017
January 22, 2018	To Arizona Coyotes John Ramage	Columbus Blue Jackets Future considerations
January 22, 2018	To Los Angeles Kings Future considerations	To Columbus Blue Jackets Jeff Zatkoff
February 25, 2018	To Nashville Predators 4th round pick in 2018	To Columbus Blue Jackets Mark Letestu
January 22, 2018	To Ottawa Senators Nick Moutrey; 3rd-round pick in 2020	To Columbus Blue Jackets Ian Cole
February 26, 2018	To Arizona Coyotes Jordan Maletta	To Columbus Blue Jackets Ryan Kujawinski
February 26, 2018	To Vancouver Canucks Jussi Jokinen; Tyler Motte	To Columbus Blue Jackets Thomas Vanek

Notes:

- ^{[a]} The Vegas Golden Knights will not select Josh Anderson, Jack Johnson, or Joonas Korpisalo in the 2017 NHL expansion draft

=== Free agents acquired ===
Date	Player	Former team	Contract terms (in U.S. dollars)	Ref
July 1, 2017	Cameron Gaunce	Pittsburgh Penguins	2-year, $1.3 million	
July 1, 2017	Andre Benoit	Malmö Redhawks	1-year, $800,000	
August 21, 2017	Doyle Somerby	Boston Terriers	2-year, $1.85 million entry-level contract	
November 3, 2017	Maxime Fortier	Halifax Mooseheads	3-year, $2.775 million entry-level contract	
January 24, 2018	Nathan Gerbe	Genève-Servette HC	1-year, $650,000	
March 26, 2018	Eric Robinson	Princeton Tigers	2-year, $1.85 million entry-level contract	

=== Free agents lost ===
Date	Player	New team	Contract terms (in U.S. dollars)	Ref
July 1, 2017	Ryan Stanton	Edmonton Oilers	2-year, $1.4 million	
July 1, 2017	Kyle Quincey	Minnesota Wild	1-year, $1.25 million	
July 1, 2017	Sam Gagner	Vancouver Canucks	3-year, $9.45 million	
July 1, 2017	T.J. Tynan	Vegas Golden Knights	2-year, $1.3 million	
July 3, 2017	Oscar Dansk	Vegas Golden Knights	1-year, $650,000	
July 13, 2017	Jaime Sifers	Utica Comets	2-year	
September 19, 2017	Oleg Yevenko	Stockton Heat	Unknown	

=== Claimed via waivers ===
Player	Previous team	Date	Ref
Jussi Jokinen	Los Angeles Kings	January 17, 2018	
Taylor Chorney	Washington Capitals	February 21, 2018	

=== Lost via waivers ===
Player	New team	Date	Ref

=== Lost via retirement ===
Date	Player	Ref

=== Player signings ===
Date	Player	Contract terms (in U.S. dollars)	Ref
June 23, 2017	Alex Broadhurst	1-year, $650,000	
June 27, 2017	Jordan Schroeder	2-year, $1.3 million	
September 1, 2017	Alex Wennberg	6-year, $29.4 million	
October 2, 2017	Josh Anderson	3-year, $5.55 million	
November 16, 2017	Cam Atkinson	7-year, $41.125 million contract extension	
March 14, 2018	Dean Kukan	2-year, $1.45 million contract extension	
March 15, 2018	Nathan Gerbe	2-year, $1.35 million contract extension	
March 29, 2018	Markus Nutivaara	4-year, $10.8 million contract extension	
May 4, 2018	Jonathan Davidsson	3-year, $2.55 million entry-level contract	
May 22, 2018	Alexandre Texier	3-year, $2.775 million entry-level contract	
June 18, 2018	Alex Broadhurst	1-year, $700,000 contract extension	

== Draft picks ==
Below are the Columbus Blue Jackets' selections at the 2017 NHL entry draft, which was held on June 23 and 24, 2017 at the United Center in Chicago.

Round	#	Player	Pos	Nationality	College/Junior/Club team (League)
2	45^{1}	Alexandre Texier	C	France	Brûleurs de Loups (Ligue Magnus)
3	86	Daniil Tarasov	G	Russia	Tolpar Ufa (MHL)
4	117	Emil Bemstrom	C	Sweden	Leksands IF (J20 SuperElit)
5	148	Kale Howarth	C	Canada	Trail Smoke Eaters (BCHL)
6	170^{2}	Jonathan Davidsson	RW	Sweden	Djurgårdens IF (SHL)
6	179	Carson Meyer	RW	United States	Miami RedHawks (NCHC)
7	210	Robbie Stucker	D	United States	Saint Thomas Academy (USHS)

Draft notes:

1. The Tampa Bay Lightning's second-round pick went to the Columbus Blue Jackets as the result of a trade on June 24, 2017 that sent Keegan Kolesar to Vegas in exchange for this pick.
2. The New York Islanders' sixth-round pick went to the Columbus Blue Jackets as the result of a trade on June 23, 2017 that sent Brandon Saad, Anton Forsberg and a fifth-round pick in 2018 to Chicago in exchange for Artemi Panarin, Tyler Motte and this pick.
