= 2017–18 Carolina Hurricanes season =

National Hockey League team season

2017–18 Carolina Hurricanes
- Division: 6th Metropolitan
- Conference: 10th Eastern
- 2017–18 record: 36–35–11
- Home record: 19–16–6
- Road record: 17–19–5
- Goals for: 228
- Goals against: 256

Team information
- General manager: Ron Francis (Oct.–Mar.); Vacant (Mar.–Apr.)
- Coach: Bill Peters
- Captain: Justin Faulk; Jordan Staal
- Alternate captains: Jeff Skinner
- Arena: PNC Arena
- Average attendance: 13,320
- Minor league affiliates: Charlotte Checkers (AHL); Florida Everblades (ECHL)

Team leaders
- Goals: Sebastian Aho (29)
- Assists: Teuvo Teravainen (41)
- Points: Sebastian Aho (65)
- Penalty minutes: Justin Williams (56)
- Plus/minus: Trevor van Riemsdyk (+9)
- Wins: Cam Ward (23)
- Goals against average: Cam Ward (2.73)

The 2017–18 Carolina Hurricanes season was the 39th season for the National Hockey League (NHL) franchise that was established on June 22, 1979 (following seven seasons of play in the World Hockey Association), and 20th season since the franchise relocated from Hartford to start the 1997–98 NHL season. The Hurricanes failed to make the playoffs for the ninth consecutive season. As of the 2025–26 season, this is the most recent season the Hurricanes missed the playoffs.

== Standings ==
Metropolitan Division
Pos	Team	GP	W	L	OTL	ROW	GF	GA	GD	Pts
1	y – Washington Capitals	82	49	26	7	46	259	239	+20	105
2	x – Pittsburgh Penguins	82	47	29	6	45	272	250	+22	100
3	x – Philadelphia Flyers	82	42	26	14	40	251	243	+8	98
4	x – Columbus Blue Jackets	82	45	30	7	39	242	230	+12	97
5	x – New Jersey Devils	82	44	29	9	39	248	244	+4	97
6	Carolina Hurricanes	82	36	35	11	33	228	256	−28	83
7	New York Islanders	82	35	37	10	32	264	296	−32	80
8	New York Rangers	82	34	39	9	31	231	268	−37	77

Source: National Hockey League
x – Clinched playoff spot; y – Clinched division

Eastern Conference Wild Card
Pos	Div	Team	GP	W	L	OTL	ROW	GF	GA	GD	Pts
1	ME	x – Columbus Blue Jackets	82	45	30	7	39	242	230	+12	97
2	ME	x – New Jersey Devils	82	44	29	9	39	248	244	+4	97
3	AT	Florida Panthers	82	44	30	8	41	248	246	+2	96
4	ME	Carolina Hurricanes	82	36	35	11	33	228	256	−28	83
5	ME	New York Islanders	82	35	37	10	32	264	296	−32	80
6	ME	New York Rangers	82	34	39	9	31	231	268	−37	77
7	AT	Detroit Red Wings	82	30	39	13	25	217	255	−38	73
8	AT	Montreal Canadiens	82	29	40	13	27	209	264	−55	71
9	AT	Ottawa Senators	82	28	43	11	26	221	291	−70	67
10	AT	Buffalo Sabres	82	25	45	12	24	199	280	−81	62

Source: National Hockey League
x – Clinched playoff spot

== Schedule and results ==
=== Preseason ===
The preseason schedule was released on June 8, 2017.

2017 preseason game log: 5–2–0 (Home: 1–2–0; Road: 4–0–0)
#	Date	Visitor	Score	Home	OT	Decision	Attendance	Record	Recap
1	September 18	Carolina	3–2	Buffalo	OT	Nedeljkovic	16,310	1–0–0	Recap
2	September 19	Carolina	2–1	Tampa Bay		Nedeljkovic	11,454	2–0–0	Recap
3	September 20	Tampa Bay	4–3	Carolina		Smith	6,486	2–1–0	Recap
4	September 23	Carolina	4–1	Washington		Ward	15,514	3–1–0	Recap
5	September 25	Carolina	6–2	Edmonton		Darling	18,347	4–1–0	Recap
6^{[a]}	September 27	Edmonton	4–0	Carolina		Ward	—	4–2–0	Recap
7	September 29	Washington	1–3	Carolina		Darling	8,797	5–2–0	Recap
Notes:^{a} Game was played at SaskTel Centre in Saskatoon, Saskatchewan.

=== Regular season ===
The regular season schedule was announced on June 22, 2017.

2017–18 game log

October: 4–4–2 (Home: 1–2–2; Road: 3–2–0)
#	Date	Visitor	Score	Home	OT	Decision	Attendance	Record	Pts	Recap
1	October 7	Minnesota	4–5	Carolina	SO	Darling	18,680	1–0–0	2	Recap
2	October 10	Columbus	2–1	Carolina	OT	Darling	7,892	1–0–1	3	Recap
3	October 14	Carolina	1–2	Winnipeg		Darling	15,321	1–1–1	3	Recap
4	October 17	Carolina	5–3	Edmonton		Ward	18,347	2–1–1	5	Recap
5	October 19	Carolina	2–1	Calgary		Darling	18,119	3–1–1	7	Recap
6	October 21	Carolina	3–4	Dallas		Darling	18,023	3–2–1	7	Recap
7	October 24	Tampa Bay	5–1	Carolina		Darling	10,498	3–3–1	7	Recap
8	October 26	Carolina	6–3	Toronto		Darling	19,070	4–3–1	9	Recap
9	October 27	St. Louis	2–1	Carolina		Ward	10,069	4–4–1	9	Recap
10	October 29	Anaheim	4–3	Carolina	SO	Darling	10,108	4–4–2	10	Recap

November: 6–4–3 (Home: 4–2–1; Road: 2–2–2)
#	Date	Visitor	Score	Home	OT	Decision	Attendance	Record	Pts	Recap
11	November 2	Carolina	3–5	Colorado		Ward	12,048	4–5–2	10	Recap
12	November 4	Carolina	1–2	Arizona	SO	Darling	12,019	4–5–3	11	Recap
13	November 7	Florida	1–3	Carolina		Darling	8,828	5–5–3	13	Recap
14	November 10	Carolina	3–1	Columbus		Ward	16,049	6–5–3	15	Recap
15	November 11	Chicago	4–3	Carolina	OT	Darling	16,778	6–5–4	16	Recap
16	November 13	Dallas	1–5	Carolina		Darling	7,968	7–5–4	18	Recap
17	November 16	Carolina	4–6	NY Islanders		Darling	11,188	7–6–4	18	Recap
18	November 18	Carolina	3–1	Buffalo		Darling	18,028	8–6–4	20	Recap
19	November 19	NY Islanders	2–4	Carolina		Ward	11,390	9–6–4	22	Recap
20	November 22	NY Rangers	6–1	Carolina		Darling	11,398	9–7–4	22	Recap
21	November 24	Toronto	5–4	Carolina		Darling	15,241	9–8–4	22	Recap
22	November 26	Nashville	3–4	Carolina	SO	Darling	11,133	10–8–4	24	Recap
23	November 28	Carolina	2–3	Columbus	SO	Darling	13,947	10–8–5	25	Recap

December: 8–5–2 (Home: 5–0–0; Road: 3–5–2)
#	Date	Visitor	Score	Home	OT	Decision	Attendance	Record	Pts	Recap
24	December 1	Carolina	1–5	NY Rangers		Darling	17,695	10–9–5	25	Recap
25	December 2	Florida	2–3	Carolina	OT	Ward	14,246	11–9–5	27	Recap
26	December 5	Carolina	0–3	Vancouver		Darling	17,860	11–10–5	27	Recap
27	December 7	Carolina	4–5	San Jose	OT	Ward	16,947	11–10–6	28	Recap
28	December 9	Carolina	2–3	Los Angeles	OT	Darling	18,230	11–10–7	29	Recap
29	December 11	Carolina	2–3	Anaheim		Darling	16,198	11–11–7	29	Recap
30	December 12	Carolina	3–2	Vegas	SO	Ward	17,520	12–11–7	31	Recap
31	December 15	Carolina	5–4	Buffalo	OT	Ward	17,610	13–11–7	33	Recap
32	December 16	Columbus	1–2	Carolina		Darling	11,357	14–11–7	35	Recap
33	December 19	Carolina	1–8	Toronto		Darling	19,288	14–12–7	35	Recap
34	December 21	Carolina	4–1	Nashville		Ward	17,492	15–12–7	37	Recap
35	December 23	Buffalo	2–4	Carolina		Ward	14,470	16–12–7	39	Recap
36	December 27	Montreal	1–3	Carolina		Ward	14,880	17–12–7	41	Recap
37	December 29	Pittsburgh	1–2	Carolina		Ward	17,975	18–12–7	43	Recap
38	December 30	Carolina	2–3	St. Louis		Darling	18,749	18–13–7	43	Recap

January: 5–6–1 (Home: 1–3–1; Road: 4–3–0)
#	Date	Visitor	Score	Home	OT	Decision	Attendance	Record	Pts	Recap
39	January 2	Washington	5–4	Carolina	OT	Ward	11,989	18–13–8	44	Recap
40	January 4	Carolina	4–0	Pittsburgh		Ward	18,595	19–13–8	46	Recap
41	January 6	Carolina	1–7	Boston		Ward	17,565	19–14–8	46	Recap
42	January 9	Carolina	4–5	Tampa Bay		Ward	19,092	19–15–8	46	Recap
43	January 11	Carolina	3–1	Washington		Darling	18,506	20–15–8	48	Recap
44	January 12	Washington	4–3	Carolina		Ward	16,239	20–16–8	48	Recap
45	January 14	Calgary	4–1	Carolina		Darling	15,218	20–17–8	48	Recap
46	January 20	Carolina	3–1	Detroit		Ward	19,515	21–17–8	50	Recap
47	January 21	Vegas	5–1	Carolina		Darling	15,303	21–18–8	50	Recap
48	January 23	Carolina	1–3	Pittsburgh		Ward	18,421	21–19–8	50	Recap
49	January 25	Carolina	6–5	Montreal		Ward	21,302	22–19–8	52	Recap
50	January 30	Ottawa	1–2	Carolina		Ward	11,448	23–19–8	54	Recap

February: 4–6–3 (Home: 4–4–2; Road: 0–2–1)
#	Date	Visitor	Score	Home	OT	Decision	Attendance	Record	Pts	Recap
51	February 1	Montreal	0–2	Carolina		Ward	11,953	24–19–8	56	Recap
52	February 2	Detroit	4–1	Carolina		Darling	18,126	24–20–8	56	Recap
53	February 4	San Jose	3–1	Carolina		Ward	11,614	24–21–8	56	Recap
54	February 6	Philadelphia	2–1	Carolina	OT	Ward	11,585	24–21–9	57	Recap
55	February 9	Vancouver	1–4	Carolina		Darling	13,123	25–21–9	59	Recap
56	February 10	Colorado	1–3	Carolina		Ward	15,589	26–21–9	61	Recap
57	February 13	Los Angeles	3–7	Carolina		Ward	12,805	27–21–9	63	Recap
58	February 15	Carolina	2–5	New Jersey		Darling	14,079	27–22–9	63	Recap
59	February 16	NY Islanders	3–0	Carolina		Ward	15,448	27–23–9	63	Recap
60	February 18	New Jersey	3–2	Carolina	OT	Ward	18,680	27–23–10	64	Recap
61	February 23	Pittsburgh	6–1	Carolina		Ward	18,180	27–24–10	64	Recap
62	February 24	Carolina	1–3	Detroit		Darling	19,515	27–25–10	64	Recap
63	February 27	Carolina	3–4	Boston	OT	Darling	17,565	27–25–11	65	Recap

March: 8–8–0 (Home: 3–5–0; Road: 5–3–0)
#	Date	Visitor	Score	Home	OT	Decision	Attendance	Record	Pts	Recap
64	March 1	Carolina	4–1	Philadelphia		Ward	19,245	28–25–11	67	Recap
65	March 2	New Jersey	1–3	Carolina		Ward	14,337	29–25–11	69	Recap
66	March 4	Winnipeg	3–2	Carolina		Ward	11,407	29–26–11	69	Recap
67	March 6	Carolina	2–6	Minnesota		Ward	19,017	29–27–11	69	Recap
68	March 8	Carolina	3–2	Chicago		Darling	21,681	30–27–11	71	Recap
69	March 12	Carolina	3–6	NY Rangers		Darling	17,679	30–28–11	71	Recap
70	March 13	Boston	6–4	Carolina		Ward	13,081	30–29–11	71	Recap
71	March 17	Philadelphia	4–2	Carolina		Ward	14,805	30–30–11	71	Recap
72	March 18	Carolina	4–3	NY Islanders		Darling	10,688	31–30–11	73	Recap
73	March 20	Edmonton	7–3	Carolina		Darling	10,554	31–31–11	73	Recap
74	March 22	Arizona	5–6	Carolina		Ward	10,535	32–31–11	75	Recap
75	March 24	Carolina	5–2	Ottawa		Ward	16,555	33–31–11	77	Recap
76	March 26	Ottawa	1–4	Carolina		Ward	10,817	34–31–11	79	Recap
77	March 27	Carolina	3–4	New Jersey		Darling	15,521	34–32–11	79	Recap
78	March 30	Carolina	4–1	Washington		Darling	18,506	35–32–11	81	Recap
79	March 31	NY Rangers	2–1	Carolina		Ward	14,993	35–33–11	81	Recap

April: 1–2–0 (Home: 1–0–0; Road: 0–2–0)
#	Date	Visitor	Score	Home	OT	Decision	Attendance	Record	Pts	Recap
80	April 2	Carolina	2–3	Florida		Darling	10,619	35–34–11	81	Recap
81	April 5	Carolina	3–4	Philadelphia		Darling	20,001	35–35–11	81	Recap
82	April 7	Tampa Bay	2–3	Carolina	OT	Ward	15,402	36–35–11	83	Recap

Legend: Win (2 points) Loss (0 points) Overtime/shootout loss (1 point)

== Player statistics ==
Final

Skaters

Regular season
Player	GP	G	A	Pts	+/−	PIM
Sebastian Aho	78	29	36	65	4	24
Teuvo Teravainen	82	23	41	64	8	14
Justin Williams	82	16	35	51	−9	56
Jeff Skinner	82	24	25	49	−27	34
Jordan Staal	79	19	27	46	−4	26
Elias Lindholm	81	16	28	44	−8	18
Derek Ryan	80	15	23	38	−15	28
Noah Hanifin	79	10	22	32	−20	21
Victor Rask	71	14	17	31	0	12
Justin Faulk	76	8	23	31	−26	48
Brock McGinn	80	16	14	30	−12	22
Jaccob Slavin	82	8	22	30	1	10
Brett Pesce	65	3	16	19	−6	18
Trevor van Riemsdyk	79	3	13	16	9	20
Phillip Di Giuseppe	49	5	8	13	0	17
Lee Stempniak	37	3	6	9	−8	4
Haydn Fleury	67	0	8	8	−2	14
Valentin Zykov	10	3	4	7	4	2
Joakim Nordstrom	75	2	5	7	−11	6
Josh Jooris^{‡}	31	3	3	6	−7	16
Marcus Kruger	48	1	5	6	−6	28
Klas Dahlbeck	33	1	4	5	−6	21
Warren Foegele	2	2	1	3	3	0
Roland McKeown	10	0	3	3	3	19
Lucas Wallmark	11	1	0	1	−4	2
Janne Kuokkanen	4	0	0	0	−3	0
Martin Necas	1	0	0	0	0	0
Trevor Carrick	1	0	0	0	0	2
Nicolas Roy	1	0	0	0	−1	0

Goaltenders

Regular season
Player	GP	GS	TOI	W	L	OT	GA	GAA	SA	SV%	SO	G	A	PIM
Cam Ward	43	42	2,459:20	23	14	4	112	2.73	1187	.906	2	0	0	14
Scott Darling	43	40	2,475:07	13	21	7	131	3.18	1171	.888	0	0	0	2

== Transactions ==
The Hurricanes have been involved in the following transactions during the 2017–18 season.

=== Trades ===
Date	Details		Ref
June 21, 2017	To Vegas Golden Knights 5th-round pick in 2017	To Carolina Hurricanes Expansion Draft Considerations^{[a]}
June 22, 2017	To Vegas Golden Knights 2nd-round pick in 2017	To Carolina Hurricanes Trevor van Riemsdyk; 7th-round pick in 2018
July 4, 2017	To Vegas Golden Knights 5th-round pick in 2018	To Carolina Hurricanes Marcus Kruger
February 26, 2018	To Pittsburgh Penguins Josh Jooris	To Carolina Hurricanes Greg McKegg
May 3, 2018	To Arizona Coyotes Marcus Kruger; 4th-round pick in 2018	To Carolina Hurricanes Jordan Martinook; 3rd-round pick in 2018

Notes

- ^{[a]} The Vegas Golden Knights will select Connor Brickley in the 2017 NHL expansion draft.

=== Free agents acquired ===
Date	Player	Former team	Contract terms (in U.S. dollars)	Ref
July 1, 2017	Justin Williams	Washington Capitals	2-year, $9 million	
July 1, 2017	Josh Jooris	Arizona Coyotes	1-year, $750,000	
July 1, 2017	Brenden Kichton	Winnipeg Jets	1-year, $700,000	
July 1, 2017	Jeremy Smith	Colorado Avalanche	1-year, $750,000	
June 15, 2018	Michael Fora	HC Ambrì-Piotta	2-year, entry-level contract	

=== Free agents lost ===
Date	Player	New team	Contract terms (in U.S. dollars)	Ref
July 1, 2017	Matt Tennyson	Buffalo Sabres	2-year, $1.3 million	
July 1, 2017	Michael Leighton	Tampa Bay Lightning	1-year, $650,000	
August 2, 2017	Andrej Nestrasil	Neftekhimik Nizhnekamsk	1-year	
May 1, 2018	Andrew Miller	Fribourg-Gottéron	1-year	
June 1, 2018	Klas Dahlbeck	CSKA Moscow	1-year	

=== Claimed via waivers ===
Player	Previous team	Date	Ref

=== Lost via waivers ===
Player	New team	Date	Ref

=== Lost via retirement ===
Date	Player	Ref
April 8, 2017	Bryan Bickell	

=== Player signings ===
Date	Player	Contract terms (in U.S. dollars)	Ref
June 26, 2017	Derek Ryan	1-year, $1.425 million	
June 26, 2017	Trevor Carrick	1-year, $670,000	
June 27, 2017	Patrick Brown	1-year, $650,000	
June 27, 2017	Jake Chelios	1-year, $650,000	
June 28, 2017	Brock McGinn	2-year, $1.775 million	
June 28, 2017	Philip Samuelsson	1-year, $650,000	
July 1, 2017	Dennis Robertson	1-year, $650,000	
July 12, 2017	Jaccob Slavin	7-year, $37.1 million contract extension	
July 14, 2017	Martin Necas	3-year, $2.775 million entry-level contract	
July 27, 2017	Phillip Di Giuseppe	1-year, $725,000	
August 1, 2017	Brett Pesce	6-year, $24.15 million	
March 27, 2018	Jeremy Helvig	3-year, $2.355 million entry-level contract	
May 10, 2018	Morgan Geekie	3-year, $2.4 million entry-level contract	
May 29, 2018	Trevor Carrick	1-year, $700,000 contract extension	
June 6, 2018	Patrick Brown	1-year, $650,000 contract extension	
June 9, 2018	Andrew Poturalski	1-year, $700,000 contract extension	

== Draft picks ==
Below are the Carolina Hurricanes' selections at the 2017 NHL entry draft, which was held on June 23 and 24, 2017 at the United Center in Chicago.

Round	#	Player	Pos	Nationality	College/Junior/Club team (League)
1	12	Martin Necas	C	Czech Republic	HC Kometa Brno (Czech Extraliga)
2	42	Eetu Luostarinen	C	Finland	KalPa (Liiga)
2	52^{1}	Luke Martin	D	United States	Michigan Wolverines (Big Ten)
3	67^{2}	Morgan Geekie	C	Canada	Tri-City Americans (WHL)
3	73	Stelio Mattheos	C	Canada	Brandon Wheat Kings (WHL)
4	104	Eetu Makiniemi	G	Finland	Jokerit U20 (Jr. A SM-liiga)
6	166	Brendan De Jong	D	Canada	Portland Winterhawks (WHL)
7	197	Ville Rasanen	D	Finland	Jokipojat (Mestis)

Draft notes:

1. The New York Rangers' second-round pick will go to the Carolina Hurricanes as the result of a trade on February 28, 2016, that sent Eric Staal to New York in exchange for Aleksi Saarela, a second-round pick in 2016 and this pick.
2. The New Jersey Devils' third-round pick will go to the Carolina Hurricanes as the result of a trade on March 5, 2014, that sent Tuomo Ruutu to New Jersey in exchange for Andrei Loktionov and this pick (being conditional at the time of the trade). The condition and date of conversion are unknown.
