= Filip Sveningsson =

Swedish ice hockey player

- Born: 3 July 1999 (age 26) Gislaved, Sweden
- Height: 6 ft 0 in (183 cm)
- Weight: 181 lb (82 kg; 12 st 13 lb)
- Position: Left wing
- Shoots: Left
- Allsv team Former teams: BIK Karlskoga; HV71; IK Oskarshamn
- NHL draft: 202nd overall, 2017; Calgary Flames
- Playing career: 2016–present

Filip Sveningsson (born July 3, 1999) is a Swedish professional ice hockey player currently playing for BIK Karlskoga of the HockeyAllsvenskan (Allsv). Sveningsson was drafted in the seventh round, 202nd overall, by the Calgary Flames in the 2017 NHL entry draft.

== Playing career ==
Sveningsson made his SHL debut playing for HV71 in December 2016, playing in two games in the 2016–17 season. Showing promising potential, Sveningsson was last draft pick taken by the Calgary Flames in the seventh round, 202nd overall, in the 2017 NHL entry draft.

Following the 2017–18 season, Sveningsson left HV71 to sign a two-year contract with second tier club, IK Oskarshamn, on April 19, 2018.

Helping Oskarshamn gain promotion in his first season with the club, Sveningsson made 29 appearances in the SHL with Oskarshamn in the COVID-19 interrupted 2019–20 season. He was loaned to Allsvenskan club, Tingsryds AIF, collecting 4 points through 8 games.

With his contract completed with Oskarshamn, Sveningsson left as a free agent to continue his career in returning to the Allsvenskan with Modo Hockey on 1 April 2020.

== Career statistics ==
=== Regular season and playoffs ===
			Regular season					Playoffs
Season	Team	League	GP	G	A	Pts	PIM	GP	G	A	Pts	PIM
2015–16	HV71	J20	11	1	2	3	10	3	0	1	1	4
2016–17	HV71	J20	37	15	14	29	59	7	4	4	8	2
2016–17	HV71	SHL	2	0	0	0	0	—	—	—	—	—
2017–18	HV71	J20	35	17	22	39	63	6	4	6	10	8
2017–18	HV71	SHL	11	0	0	0	0	—	—	—	—	—
2018–19	IK Oskarshamn	Allsv	43	15	12	27	26	12	0	4	4	4
2019–20	IK Oskarshamn	SHL	29	2	2	4	14	—	—	—	—	—
2019–20	Tingsryds AIF	Allsv	8	1	3	4	0	—	—	—	—	—
2020–21	Modo Hockey	Allsv	49	7	7	14	18	—	—	—	—	—
2021–22	Modo Hockey	Allsv	31	10	12	22	53	10	5	5	10	29
2022–23	Modo Hockey	Allsv	48	10	13	23	41	3	0	0	0	2
SHL totals			42	2	2	4	14	—	—	—	—	—

=== International ===
Year	Team	Event	Result	GP	G	A	Pts	PIM
2015	Sweden	U17	3rd place, bronze medalist(s)	6	0	2	2	18
2019	Sweden	WJC	5th	4	0	0	0	0
Junior totals				10	0	2	2	18
