= Jesse Graham =

Canadian ice hockey player (born 1994)

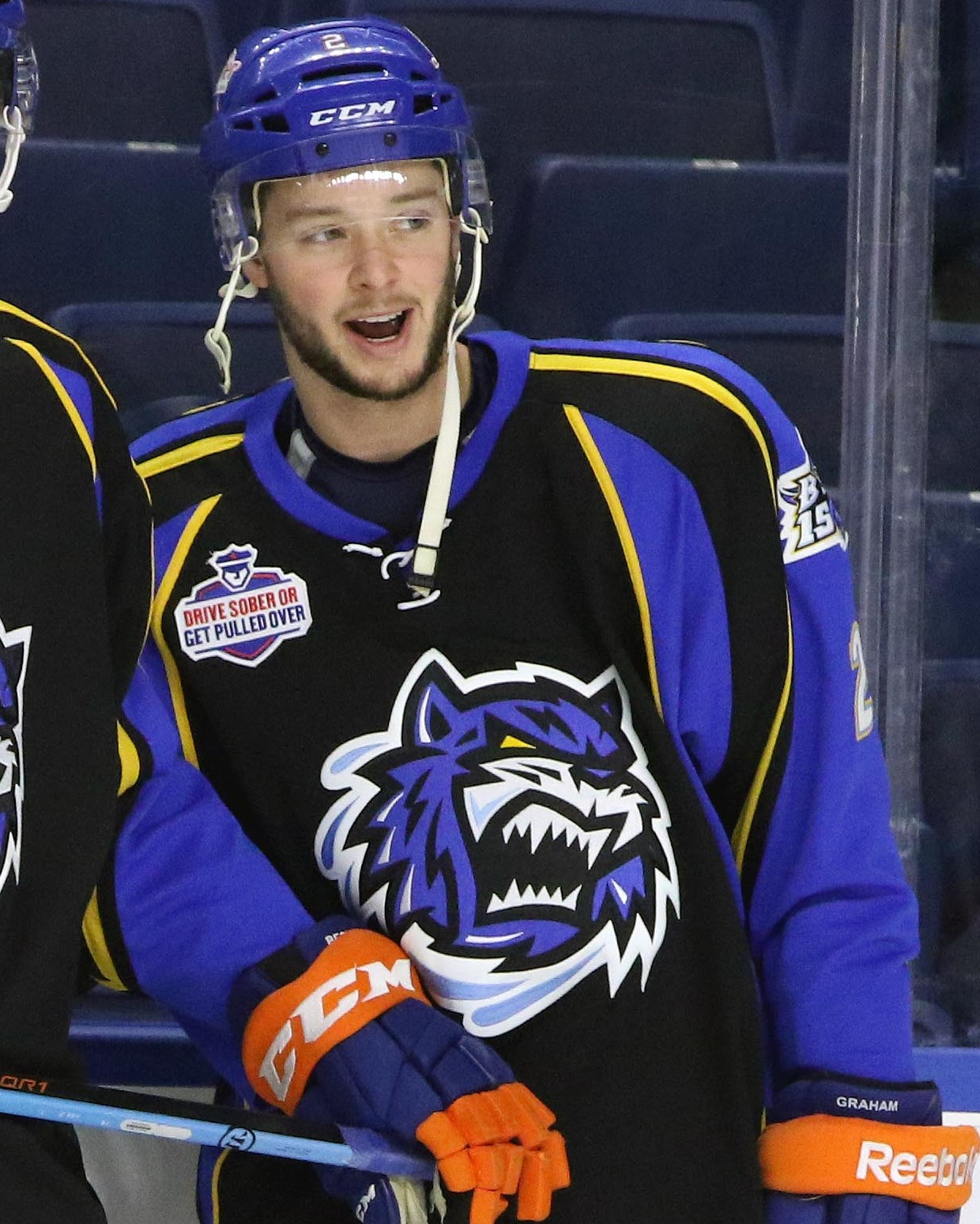
- Graham with the Bridgeport Sound Tigers in 2015
- Born: May 13, 1994 (age 32) Oshawa, Ontario, Canada
- Height: 6 ft 0 in (183 cm)
- Weight: 185 lb (84 kg; 13 st 3 lb)
- Position: Defence
- Shoots: Right
- KHL team Former teams: HC Sochi; Bridgeport Sound Tigers; San Antonio Rampage; Utica Comets; HK Nitra; KalPa; Augsburger Panther; Barys Astana; EV Zug
- NHL draft: 155th overall, 2012; New York Islanders
- Playing career: 2014–present

Jesse Graham (born May 13, 1994) is a Canadian professional ice hockey defenceman who currently plays for HC Sochi of the Kontinental Hockey League (KHL).

== Playing career ==
Graham played major junior hockey with the Niagara IceDogs and Saginaw Spirit in the Ontario Hockey League (OHL) before he was selected in the sixth-round, 155th overall, by the New York Islanders in the 2012 NHL entry draft. and signed an entry-level contract with the team on May 31, 2014. He spent three seasons with the Islanders' American Hockey League affiliate the Bridgeport Sound Tigers, as well as spells in the ECHL for the Florida Everblades and Missouri Mavericks, before signing a one-year, two-way contract with the Colorado Avalanche on July 26, 2017.

Graham spent the 2017–18 season with the San Antonio Rampage, the AHL affiliation of the Avalanche. On August 30, 2018, Graham signed for the Utica Comets of the AHL, serving as the primary affiliate to the Vancouver Canucks.

After five professional seasons in North America, Graham opted to pursue a European career, moving to the Tipsport Liga in Slovakia to join HK Nitra on October 26, 2019. but left just two weeks later after playing three games for the team to join Finnish club KalPa of Liiga.

Graham spent the duration of the 2021–22 season with Augsburger Panther of the Deutsche Eishockey Liga (DEL), contributing 3 goals and 39 assists for 42 points in 52 games, leading the blueline in scoring.

As a free agent, Graham moved to the Kontinental Hockey League (KHL), agreeing to a one-year contract for the 2022–23 season with Kazakh club Barys Nur-Sultan on July 20, 2022. In his debut KHL season, Graham was a fixture on the Barys blueline, registering 19 assists through 66 regular season games.

On May 11, 2023, Graham opted to continue his tenure in the KHL, moving to Russian club HC Sochi after securing a two-year contract as a free agent.

== Career statistics ==
=== Regular season and playoffs ===
			Regular season					Playoffs
Season	Team	League	GP	G	A	Pts	PIM	GP	G	A	Pts	PIM
2009–10	Toronto Nationals	GTHL	84	14	74	88	38	—	—	—	—	—
2010–11	Niagara IceDogs	OHL	63	1	17	18	22	14	1	8	9	8
2011–12	Niagara IceDogs	OHL	68	4	37	41	36	20	1	9	10	20
2012–13	Niagara IceDogs	OHL	68	4	35	39	48	5	0	3	3	6
2013–14	Niagara IceDogs	OHL	24	6	11	17	21	—	—	—	—	—
2013–14	Saginaw Spirit	OHL	42	5	32	37	22	5	0	3	3	2
2013–14	Bridgeport Sound Tigers	AHL	7	1	3	4	2	—	—	—	—	—
2014–15	Bridgeport Sound Tigers	AHL	39	3	16	19	20	—	—	—	—	—
2014–15	Florida Everblades	ECHL	23	1	13	14	10	12	1	5	6	4
2015–16	Bridgeport Sound Tigers	AHL	52	5	12	17	34	—	—	—	—	—
2015–16	Missouri Mavericks	ECHL	11	0	9	9	2	9	0	5	5	14
2016–17	Bridgeport Sound Tigers	AHL	19	2	7	9	6	—	—	—	—	—
2016–17	Missouri Mavericks	ECHL	24	6	19	25	26	—	—	—	—	—
2017–18	San Antonio Rampage	AHL	46	4	17	21	18	—	—	—	—	—
2018–19	Utica Comets	AHL	52	4	14	18	32	—	—	—	—	—
2019–20	HK Nitra	Slovak	3	1	1	2	2	—	—	—	—	—
2019–20	KalPa	Liiga	40	4	16	20	22	—	—	—	—	—
2020–21	KalPa	Liiga	55	3	23	26	16	4	0	2	2	0
2021–22	Augsburger Panther	DEL	52	3	39	42	40	—	—	—	—	—
2022–23	Barys Astana	KHL	66	0	19	19	28	—	—	—	—	—
2023–24	HC Sochi	KHL	62	9	23	32	20	—	—	—	—	—
2024–25	HC Sochi	KHL	58	9	15	24	22	—	—	—	—	—
2025–26	EV Zug	NL	18	3	3	6	13	—	—	—	—	—
2025–26	HK Nitra	Slovak	18	2	13	15	8	19	2	6	8	4
AHL totals			215	19	69	88	112	—	—	—	—	—
Liiga totals			95	7	39	46	38	4	0	2	2	0
KHL totals			186	18	57	75	70	—	—	—	—	—

=== International ===
Year	Team	Event	Result	GP	G	A	Pts	PIM
2011	Canada Ontario	U17	1st place, gold medalist(s)	5	1	5	6	2
Junior totals				5	1	5	6	2

== Awards and honours ==
Award	Year
OHL
First All-Rookie Team	2011
