= 2017–18 Arizona Coyotes season =

NHL hockey team season

2017–18 Arizona Coyotes
- Division: 8th Pacific
- Conference: 15th Western
- 2017–18 record: 29–41–12
- Home record: 16–21–4
- Road record: 13–20–8
- Goals for: 208
- Goals against: 256

Team information
- General manager: John Chayka
- Coach: Rick Tocchet
- Captain: Vacant
- Alternate captains: Oliver Ekman-Larsson; Alex Goligoski; Niklas Hjalmarsson; Brad Richardson; Derek Stepan
- Arena: Gila River Arena
- Average attendance: 13,040
- Minor league affiliates: Tucson Roadrunners (AHL); Fort Wayne Komets (ECHL)

Team leaders
- Goals: Clayton Keller (23)
- Assists: Clayton Keller; Derek Stepan (42)
- Points: Clayton Keller (65)
- Penalty minutes: Max Domi (73)
- Plus/minus: Trevor Murphy (+5)
- Wins: Antti Raanta (21)
- Goals against average: Antti Raanta (2.24)

The 2017–18 Arizona Coyotes season was the 39th season for the National Hockey League (NHL) franchise that was established on June 22, 1979, the 22nd season since the franchise relocated from Winnipeg following the 1995–96 NHL season, and the 46th overall, including the World Hockey Association years. The Coyotes failed to qualify for the playoffs for the sixth consecutive year.

== Off-season ==
On June 22, 2017, the Coyotes announced they have mutually parted ways with head coach Dave Tippett. He was named the team's 17th head coach on September 24, 2009. During his tenure, the team went 282–257–83, and made the postseason three times, but only won two series.

== Standings ==
Pacific Division
Pos	Team	GP	W	L	OTL	ROW	GF	GA	GD	Pts
1	y – Vegas Golden Knights	82	51	24	7	47	272	228	+44	109
2	x – Anaheim Ducks	82	44	25	13	40	235	216	+19	101
3	x – San Jose Sharks	82	45	27	10	40	252	229	+23	100
4	x – Los Angeles Kings	82	45	29	8	43	239	203	+36	98
5	Calgary Flames	82	37	35	10	35	218	248	−30	84
6	Edmonton Oilers	82	36	40	6	31	234	263	−29	78
7	Vancouver Canucks	82	31	40	11	31	218	264	−46	73
8	Arizona Coyotes	82	29	41	12	27	208	256	−48	70

Source: National Hockey League
x – Clinched playoff spot; y – Clinched division

Western Conference Wild Card
Pos	Div	Team	GP	W	L	OTL	ROW	GF	GA	GD	Pts
1	PA	x – Los Angeles Kings	82	45	29	8	43	239	203	+36	98
2	CE	x – Colorado Avalanche	82	43	30	9	41	257	237	+20	95
3	CE	St. Louis Blues	82	44	32	6	41	226	222	+4	94
4	CE	Dallas Stars	82	42	32	8	38	235	225	+10	92
5	PA	Calgary Flames	82	37	35	10	35	218	248	−30	84
6	PA	Edmonton Oilers	82	36	40	6	31	234	263	−29	78
7	CE	Chicago Blackhawks	82	33	39	10	32	229	256	−27	76
8	PA	Vancouver Canucks	82	31	40	11	31	218	264	−46	73
9	PA	Arizona Coyotes	82	29	41	12	27	208	256	−48	70

Source: National Hockey League
x – Clinched playoff spot

== Schedule and results ==
=== Preseason ===
The team's preseason schedule was released on June 15, 2017.

2017 preseason game log: 2–3–1 (Home: 0–1–1; Road: 2–2–0)
#	Date	Visitor	Score	Home	OT	Decision	Attendance	Record	Recap
1	September 18	Los Angeles	–	Arizona	Game was cancelled by the Coyotes due to poor ice conditions
2	September 20	Arizona	5–1	Anaheim		Domingue	13,447	1–0–0	Recap
3	September 22	Arizona	2–4	Calgary		Domingue	18,961	1–1–0	Recap
4	September 23	San Jose	5–4	Arizona	SO	Raanta	6,703	1–1–1	Recap
5^{[a]}	September 25	Anaheim	6–4	Arizona		–	–	1–2–1	Recap
6	September 28	Arizona	1–4	Los Angeles		Domingue	11,214	1–3–1	Recap
7	September 30	Arizona	4–0	San Jose		Domingue	16,761	2–3–1	Recap
Notes:^{a} Game was played at Tucson Arena in Tucson, Arizona.

=== Regular season ===
The team's regular season schedule was published on June 22, 2017.

2017–18 game log

October: 1–11–1 (Home: 0–4–1; Road: 1–7–0)
#	Date	Visitor	Score	Home	OT	Decision	Attendance	Record	Pts	Recap
1	October 5	Arizona	4–5	Anaheim		Domingue	17,174	0–1–0	0	Recap
2	October 7	Vegas	2–1	Arizona	OT	Raanta	17,125	0–1–1	1	Recap
3	October 10	Arizona	2–5	Vegas		Raanta	18,191	0–2–1	1	Recap
4	October 12	Detroit	4–2	Arizona		Domingue	13,584	0–3–1	1	Recap
5	October 14	Boston	6–2	Arizona		Domingue	14,810	0–4–1	1	Recap
6	October 17	Arizona	1–3	Dallas		Hill	16,007	0–5–1	1	Recap
7	October 19	Dallas	5–4	Arizona		Hill	11,225	0–6–1	1	Recap
8	October 21	Chicago	4–2	Arizona		Domingue	13,777	0–7–1	1	Recap
9	October 24	Arizona	3–5	NY Islanders		Domingue	9,795	0–8–1	1	Recap
10	October 26	Arizona	2–5	NY Rangers		Hill	18,006	0–9–1	1	Recap
11	October 28	Arizona	3–4	New Jersey		Domingue	15,132	0–10–1	1	Recap
12	October 30	Arizona	4–3	Philadelphia	OT	Wedgewood	18,731	1–10–1	3	Recap
13	October 31	Arizona	3–5	Detroit		Wedgewood	19,515	1–11–1	3	Recap

November: 5–7–3 (Home: 2–4–0; Road: 3–3–3)
#	Date	Visitor	Score	Home	OT	Decision	Attendance	Record	Pts	Recap
14	November 2	Buffalo	5–4	Arizona		Raanta	11,477	1–12–1	3	Recap
15	November 4	Carolina	1–2	Arizona	SO	Raanta	12,019	2–12–1	5	Recap
16	November 6	Arizona	2–3	Washington	OT	Wedgewood	18,506	2–12–2	6	Recap
17	November 7	Arizona	1–3	Pittsburgh		Raanta	18,498	2–13–2	6	Recap
18	November 9	Arizona	2–3	St. Louis	SO	Raanta	18,156	2–13–3	7	Recap
19	November 11	Winnipeg	4–1	Arizona		Raanta	16,078	2–14–3	7	Recap
20	November 14	Arizona	1–4	Winnipeg		Raanta	15,321	2–15–3	7	Recap
21	November 16	Arizona	5–4	Montreal		Raanta	21,302	3–15–3	9	Recap
22	November 18	Arizona	3–2	Ottawa	OT	Raanta	16,471	4–15–3	11	Recap
23	November 20	Arizona	4–1	Toronto		Raanta	19,196	5–15–3	13	Recap
24	November 22	San Jose	3–1	Arizona		Wedgewood	11,214	5–16–3	13	Recap
25	November 24	Los Angeles	2–3	Arizona	OT	Wedgewood	12,285	6–16–3	15	Recap
26	November 25	Vegas	4–2	Arizona		Wedgewood	13,226	6–17–3	15	Recap
27	November 28	Arizona	2–3	Edmonton	OT	Wedgewood	18,347	6–17–4	16	Recap
28	November 30	Arizona	0–3	Calgary		Wedgewood	18,093	6–18–4	16	Recap

December: 3–9–1 (Home: 2–5–0; Road: 1–4–1)
#	Date	Visitor	Score	Home	OT	Decision	Attendance	Record	Pts	Recap
29	December 2	New Jersey	0–5	Arizona		Wedgewood	14,338	7–18–4	18	Recap
30	December 3	Arizona	2–3	Vegas	OT	Wedgewood	17,519	7–18–5	19	Recap
31	December 7	Arizona	1–6	Boston		Wedgewood	17,565	7–19–5	19	Recap
32	December 9	Arizona	0–1	Columbus		Raanta	17,785	7–20–5	19	Recap
33	December 10	Arizona	1–3	Chicago		Wedgewood	21,654	7–21–5	19	Recap
34	December 14	Tampa Bay	4–1	Arizona		Raanta	11,591	7–22–5	19	Recap
35	December 16	Pittsburgh	4–2	Arizona		Raanta	13,051	7–23–5	19	Recap
36	December 19	Florida	3–2	Arizona		Raanta	10,203	7–24–5	19	Recap
37	December 22	Washington	2–3	Arizona	OT	Wedgewood	10,904	8–24–5	21	Recap
38	December 23	Colorado	6–2	Arizona		Raanta	11,838	8–25–5	21	Recap
39	December 27	Arizona	3–1	Colorado		Raanta	15,671	9–25–5	23	Recap
40	December 28	Toronto	7–4	Arizona		Wedgewood	17,125	9–26–5	23	Recap
41	December 31	Arizona	2–5	Anaheim		Raanta	17,174	9–27–5	23	Recap

January: 3–2–4 (Home: 2–2–2; Road: 1–0–2)
#	Date	Visitor	Score	Home	OT	Decision	Attendance	Record	Pts	Recap
42	January 4	Nashville	2–3	Arizona	OT	Raanta	13,190	10–27–5	25	Recap
43	January 6	NY Rangers	2–1	Arizona	SO	Raanta	13,420	10–27–6	26	Recap
44	January 12	Edmonton	4–2	Arizona		Raanta	14,077	10–28–6	26	Recap
45	January 13	Arizona	5–6	San Jose	OT	Wedgewood	17,562	10–28–7	27	Recap
46	January 16	San Jose	3–2	Arizona	SO	Raanta	11,961	10–28–8	28	Recap
47	January 18	Arizona	2–3	Nashville	SO	Raanta	17,138	10–28–9	29	Recap
48	January 20	Arizona	5–2	St. Louis		Raanta	19,235	11–28–9	31	Recap
49	January 22	NY Islanders	2–3	Arizona	OT	Raanta	11,707	12–28–9	33	Recap
50	January 25	Columbus	2–1	Arizona		Raanta	12,281	12–29–9	33	Recap

February: 6–5–1 (Home: 4–3–1; Road: 2–2–0)
#	Date	Visitor	Score	Home	OT	Decision	Attendance	Record	Pts	Recap
51	February 1	Dallas	4–1	Arizona		Wedgewood	10,998	12–30–9	33	Recap
52	February 3	Arizona	0–6	Los Angeles		Wedgewood	18,230	12–31–9	33	Recap
53	February 6	Arizona	3–4	Winnipeg		Raanta	15,321	12–32–9	33	Recap
54	February 8	Arizona	4–3	Minnesota	OT	Raanta	18,816	13–32–9	35	Recap
55	February 10	Philadelphia	4–3	Arizona	SO	Raanta	13,004	13–32–10	36	Recap
56	February 12	Chicago	1–6	Arizona		Raanta	14,357	14–32–10	38	Recap
57	February 13	Arizona	2–1	San Jose		Wedgewood	17,125	15–32–10	40	Recap
58	February 15	Montreal	2–5	Arizona		Raanta	11,489	16–32–10	42	Recap
59	February 17	Edmonton	0–1	Arizona		Raanta	16,304	17–32–10	44	Recap
60	February 22	Calgary	5–2	Arizona		Raanta	11,904	17–33–10	44	Recap
61	February 24	Anaheim	0–2	Arizona		Raanta	11,959	18–33–10	46	Recap
62	February 25	Vancouver	3–1	Arizona		Kuemper	10,935	18–34–10	46	Recap

March: 10–6–1 (Home: 6–2–0; Road: 4–4–1)
#	Date	Visitor	Score	Home	OT	Decision	Attendance	Record	Pts	Recap
63	March 1	Minnesota	3–5	Arizona		Raanta	10,904	19–34–10	48	Recap
64	March 3	Ottawa	1–2	Arizona		Raanta	10,955	20–34–10	50	Recap
65	March 5	Arizona	3–4	Edmonton	OT	Kuemper	18,347	20–34–11	51	Recap
66	March 7	Arizona	2–1	Vancouver		Kuemper	17,742	21–34–11	53	Recap
67	March 10	Arizona	2–5	Colorado		Kuemper	17,127	21–35–11	53	Recap
68	March 11	Vancouver	0–1	Arizona		Kuemper	11,697	22–35–11	55	Recap
69	March 13	Los Angeles	3–4	Arizona	SO	Hill	11,346	23–35–11	57	Recap
70	March 15	Nashville	3–2	Arizona		Kuemper	14,527	23–36–11	57	Recap
71	March 17	Minnesota	3–1	Arizona		Raanta	13,735	23–37–11	57	Recap
72	March 19	Calgary	2–5	Arizona		Raanta	13,288	24–37–11	59	Recap
73	March 21	Arizona	4–1	Buffalo		Raanta	17,029	25–37–11	61	Recap
74	March 22	Arizona	5–6	Carolina		Kuemper	10,535	25–38–11	61	Recap
75	March 24	Arizona	2–4	Florida		Kuemper	14,905	25–39–11	61	Recap
76	March 26	Arizona	4–1	Tampa Bay		Raanta	19,092	26–39–11	63	Recap
77	March 28	Arizona	3–2	Vegas		Raanta	18,121	27–39–11	65	Recap
78	March 29	Arizona	2–4	Los Angeles		Kuemper	18,230	27–40–11	65	Recap
79	March 31	St. Louis	0–6	Arizona		Raanta	17,380	28–40–11	67	Recap

April: 1–1–1 (Home: 0–1–0; Road: 1–0–1)
#	Date	Visitor	Score	Home	OT	Decision	Attendance	Record	Pts	Recap
80	April 3	Arizona	4–1	Calgary		Raanta	18,677	29–40–11	69	Recap
81	April 5	Arizona	3–4	Vancouver	OT	Kuemper	18,865	29–40–12	70	Recap
82	April 7	Anaheim	3–0	Arizona		Raanta	17,382	29–41–12	70	Recap

Legend: Win (2 points) Loss (0 points) Overtime/shootout loss (1 point)

== Player statistics ==
Final

Skaters

Regular season
Player	GP	G	A	Pts	+/−	PIM
Clayton Keller	82	23	42	65	−7	24
Derek Stepan	82	14	42	56	−7	26
Max Domi	82	9	36	45	−7	73
Oliver Ekman-Larsson	82	14	28	42	−28	44
Christian Dvorak	78	15	22	37	−19	22
Alex Goligoski	78	12	23	35	−31	26
Christian Fischer	79	15	18	33	−17	14
Brendan Perlini	74	17	13	30	−2	28
Kevin Connauton	73	11	10	21	3	20
Jason Demers	69	6	14	20	−4	37
Nick Cousins	71	12	7	19	−7	31
Richard Panik^{†}	35	8	11	19	4	12
Tobias Rieder^{‡}	58	8	11	19	−11	6
Anthony Duclair^{‡}	33	9	6	15	−5	10
Jordan Martinook	81	6	9	15	−24	45
Brad Richardson	76	3	12	15	−24	45
Jakob Chychrun	50	4	10	14	2	16
Josh Archibald^{†}	39	5	6	11	−2	25
Dylan Strome	21	4	5	9	4	8
Niklas Hjalmarsson	48	1	8	9	−3	18
Zac Rinaldo	53	5	2	7	−7	44
Luke Schenn	64	1	6	7	−12	35
Mario Kempe	18	2	2	4	−1	4
Trevor Murphy	8	1	2	3	5	0
Adam Clendening^{‡}	5	0	2	2	−1	2
Lawson Crouse	11	1	0	1	−6	7
Joel Hanley	5	0	0	0	0	0
Kyle Capobianco	1	0	0	0	−1	0
Laurent Dauphin	2	0	0	0	−1	2
Freddie Hamilton^{†}	8	0	0	0	1	0
Nick Merkley	1	0	0	0	0	2
Dakota Mermis	9	0	0	0	−2	0

Goaltenders

Regular season
Player	GP	GS	TOI	W	L	OT	GA	GAA	SA	SV%	SO	G	A	PIM
Antti Raanta	47	46	2,599:07	21	17	6	97	2.24	1388	.930	3	0	0	0
Scott Wedgewood^{‡}	20	17	1,096:30	5	9	4	63	3.45	587	.893	1	0	0	2
Darcy Kuemper^{†}	10	10	596:40	2	6	2	32	3.22	317	.899	1	0	0	0
Adin Hill	4	4	240:45	1	3	0	14	3.49	129	.891	0	0	0	0
Louis Domingue^{‡}	7	5	387:45	0	6	0	28	4.33	194	.856	0	0	0	0
Marek Langhamer	1	0	28:53	0	0	0	0	0.00	10	1.000	0	0	0	0

^{†}Denotes player spent time with another team before joining the Coyotes. Stats reflect time with the Coyotes only.
^{‡}Traded mid-season
Bold/italics denotes franchise record

== Transactions ==
The Coyotes have been involved in the following transactions during the 2017–18 season.

=== Trades ===
Date	Details		Ref
July 23, 2017	To Chicago Blackhawks Laurent Dauphin; Connor Murphy	To Arizona Coyotes Niklas Hjalmarsson
July 23, 2017	To New York Rangers Tony DeAngelo; 1st-round pick in 2017	To Arizona Coyotes Derek Stepan; Antti Raanta
October 28, 2017	To New Jersey Devils CGY's 5th-round pick in 2018	To Arizona Coyotes Scott Wedgewood
November 14, 2017	To Tampa Bay Lightning Louis Domingue	To Arizona Coyotes Michael Leighton; Tye McGinn
December 14, 2017	To New Jersey Devils Michael Latta	To Arizona Coyotes Ryan Kujawinski
December 19, 2017	To Pittsburgh Penguins Michael Leighton; 4th-round pick in 2019	To Arizona Coyotes Josh Archibald; Sean Maguire; 6th-round pick in 2019
January 10, 2018	To Chicago Blackhawks Adam Clendening; Anthony Duclair	To Arizona Coyotes Laurent Dauphin; Richard Panik
January 22, 2018	To Columbus Blue Jackets Future considerations	To Arizona Coyotes John Ramage
February 21, 2018	To Los Angeles Kings Tobias Rieder^{[Note 1]} Scott Wedgewood	To Arizona Coyotes Darcy Kuemper
February 26, 2018	To Columbus Blue Jackets Ryan Kujawinski	To Arizona Coyotes Jordan Maletta
February 26, 2018	To Nashville Predators Tyler Gaudet; John Ramage	To Arizona Coyotes Pierre-Cedric Labrie; Trevor Murphy
May 3, 2018	To Carolina Hurricanes Jordan Martinook; 3rd-round pick in 2018	To Arizona Coyotes Marcus Kruger; 4th-round pick in 2018
June 14, 2018	To Buffalo Sabres Rights to Brandon Hickey; Rights to Mike Sislo	To Arizona Coyotes Hudson Fasching
June 14, 2018	To San Jose Sharks Kyle Wood	To Arizona Coyotes Adam Helewka
June 15, 2018	To Montreal Canadiens Max Domi	To Arizona Coyotes Alex Galchenyuk

Notes:

- ^{Note 1} Arizona to retain 15% of salary as part of trade.

=== Free agents acquired ===
Date	Player	Former team	Contract terms (in U.S. dollars)	Ref
July 1, 2017	Adam Clendening	New York Rangers	1-year, $650,000	
July 1, 2017	Zac Rinaldo	Boston Bruins	1-year, $700,000	
July 1, 2017	Mike Sislo	Colorado Avalanche	1-year, $650,000	
July 1, 2017	Joel Hanley	Montreal Canadiens	1-year, $725,000	
July 1, 2017	Andrew Campbell	Toronto Maple Leafs	2-year, $1.3 million	
July 4, 2017	Michael Latta	Chicago Blackhawks	1-year, $650,000	
July 5, 2017	Emerson Etem	Anaheim Ducks	1-year, $850,000	
February 1, 2018	Brayden Burke	Moose Jaw Warriors	3-year, $2.775 million entry-level contract	
April 12, 2018	Jordan Gross	Notre Dame Fighting Irish	2-year, $3.55 million entry-level contract	
May 16, 2018	David Ullstrom	HV71	1-year, $650,000	
May 23, 2018	Ilya Lyubushkin	Lokomotiv Yaroslavl	1-year, $1.35 million entry-level contract	

=== Free agents lost ===
Date	Player	New team	Contract terms (in U.S. dollars)	Ref
July 1, 2017	Chad Johnson	Buffalo Sabres	1-year, $2.5 million contract	
July 1, 2017	Josh Jooris	Carolina Hurricanes	1-year, $750,000	
July 1, 2017	Grayson Downing	Edmonton Oilers	1-year	
July 1, 2017	Radim Vrbata	Florida Panthers	1-year, $2.5 million	
July 1, 2017	Peter Holland	Montreal Canadiens	2-year, $1.3 million	
July 1, 2017	Jarred Tinordi	Pittsburgh Penguins	1-year, $650,000	
July 1, 2017	Jamie McBain	Tampa Bay Lightning	1-year, $650,000	
July 1, 2017	Chris Mueller	Toronto Maple Leafs	2-year, $1.3 million	
July 1, 2017	Alexander Burmistrov	Vancouver Canucks	1-year, $900,000	
August 10, 2017	Jeremy Morin	Yugra Khanty-Mansiysk	1-year	
August 17, 2017	Mitch Moroz	Idaho Steelheads	1-year	
September 7, 2017	Joe Whitney	Hartford Wolf Pack	1-year	
September 8, 2017	Branden Troock	Greenville Swamp Rabbits	Unknown	
September 15, 2017	Garret Ross	Rochester Americans	1-year	
October 19, 2017	Zbynek Michalek	Sparta Praha	Unknown	

=== Claimed via waivers ===
Player	Previous team	Date	Ref
Freddie Hamilton	Calgary Flames	January 8, 2018	

=== Lost via waivers ===
Player	New team	Date	Ref

=== Players released ===
Date	Player	Via	Ref
January 2, 2018	Emerson Etem	Contract termination	

=== Lost via retirement ===
Date	Player	Ref
August 30, 2017	Shane Doan	

=== Player signings ===
The following players were signed by the Coyotes. Two-way contracts are marked with an asterisk (*).

Date	Player	Contract terms (in U.S. dollars)	Ref
July 1, 2017	Nick Cousins	2-year, $2 million	
July 21, 2017	Tyler Gaudet*	1-year, $650,000	
July 22, 2017	Jordan Martinook	2-year, $3.6 million	
July 24, 2017	Marek Langhamer*	1-year, $660,000	
September 3, 2017	Anthony Duclair	1-year, $1.2 million	
December 4, 2017	Pierre-Olivier Joseph	3-year, $3.4125 million entry-level contract	
February 21, 2018	Darcy Kuemper	2-year, $3.7 million contract extension	
March 6, 2018	Tyler Steenbergen	3-year, $2.625 million contract extension	
March 21, 2018	Merrick Madsen	2-year, $1.85 million entry-level contract	
April 6, 2018	Antti Raanta	3-year, $12.75 million contract extension	
May 28, 2018	Mario Kempe*	1-year, $700,000 contract extension	

== Draft picks ==
Below are the Arizona Coyotes' selections at the 2017 NHL entry draft, to be held on June 23 and 24, 2017 at the United Center in Chicago.

Round	#	Player	Pos	Nationality	College/Junior/Club team (League)
1	23^{1}	Pierre-Olivier Joseph	D	Canada	Charlottetown Islanders (QMJHL)
2	44^{2}	Filip Westerlund	D	Sweden	Frölunda HC (SHL)
3	69^{3}	MacKenzie Entwistle	C	Canada	Hamilton Bulldogs (OHL)
3	75^{4}	Nathan Schnarr	C	Canada	Guelph Storm (OHL)
3	82^{5}	Cameron Crotty	D	Canada	Brockville Braves (CCHL)
4	108^{6}	Noel Hoefenmayer	D	Canada	Ottawa 67's (OHL)
5	126^{7}	Michael Karow	D	United States	Youngstown Phantoms (USHL)
5	128	Tyler Steenbergen	C	Canada	Swift Current Broncos (WHL)
7	190	Erik Walli Walterholm	RW	Sweden	Djurgårdens IF (J18 Allsvenskan)

Notes:

1. The Minnesota Wild's first-round pick went to the Arizona Coyotes as the result of a trade on February 26, 2017 that sent Martin Hanzal, Ryan White and a fourth-round pick in 2017 to Minnesota in exchange for Grayson Downing, a second-round pick in 2018, a conditional fourth-round pick in 2019 and this pick.
2. The Philadelphia Flyers' second-round pick went to the Arizona Coyotes as the result of a trade on June 24, 2017 that sent a second-round pick in 2017 (35th overall) to Philadelphia in exchange for a third-round pick in 2017 (75th overall), the Islanders' fourth-round pick in 2017 (108th overall) and this pick.
3. The Detroit Red Wings' third-round pick went to the Arizona Coyotes as the result of a trade on June 20, 2016 that sent Maxim Letunov and a sixth-round pick in 2017 to San Jose in exchange for a fourth-round pick in 2016 and this pick.
4. The Philadelphia Flyers' third-round pick went to the Arizona Coyotes as the result of a trade on June 24, 2017 that sent a second-round pick in 2017 (35th overall) to Philadelphia in exchange for a second-round pick in 2017 (44th overall), the Islanders' fourth-round pick in 2017 (108th overall) and this pick.
5. The Calgary Flames' third-round pick will go to the Arizona Coyotes as the result of a trade on February 20, 2017 that sent Michael Stone to Calgary in exchange for a conditional fifth-round pick in 2018 and this pick.
6. The New York Islanders' fourth-round pick went to the Arizona Coyotes as the result of a trade on June 24, 2017 that sent a second-round pick in 2017 (35th overall) to Philadelphia in exchange for a second and third-round picks both in 2017 (44th and 75th overall) and this pick.
7. The Vancouver Canucks' fifth-round pick went to the Arizona Coyotes as the result of a trade on June 24, 2017 that sent Calgary's third-round pick in 2017 (78th overall) to Edmonton in exchange for St. Louis' third-round pick in 2017 (82nd overall) and this pick.
