= 2017–18 Buffalo Sabres season =

NHL hockey team season

2017–18 Buffalo Sabres
- Division: 8th Atlantic
- Conference: 16th Eastern
- 2017–18 record: 25–45–12
- Home record: 11–25–5
- Road record: 14–20–7
- Goals for: 199
- Goals against: 280

Team information
- General manager: Jason Botterill
- Coach: Phil Housley
- Captain: Vacant
- Alternate captains: Zach Bogosian; Jack Eichel; Kyle Okposo; Ryan O'Reilly
- Arena: KeyBank Center
- Average attendance: 18,563
- Minor league affiliates: Rochester Americans (AHL); Cincinnati Cyclones (ECHL)

Team leaders
- Goals: Jack Eichel; Sam Reinhart (25)
- Assists: Jack Eichel (39)
- Points: Jack Eichel (64)
- Penalty minutes: Jordan Nolan (69)
- Plus/minus: Casey Mittelstadt (+1)
- Wins: Robin Lehner (14)
- Goals against average: Robin Lehner (3.01)

The 2017–18 Buffalo Sabres season was the 48th season for the National Hockey League (NHL) franchise that was established on May 22, 1970. The Sabres missed the playoffs again, finishing last in the division for the second straight year and last overall in the league.

== Standings ==
Atlantic Division
Pos	Team	GP	W	L	OTL	ROW	GF	GA	GD	Pts
1	z – Tampa Bay Lightning	82	54	23	5	48	296	236	+60	113
2	x – Boston Bruins	82	50	20	12	47	270	214	+56	112
3	x – Toronto Maple Leafs	82	49	26	7	42	277	232	+45	105
4	Florida Panthers	82	44	30	8	41	248	246	+2	96
5	Detroit Red Wings	82	30	39	13	25	217	255	−38	73
6	Montreal Canadiens	82	29	40	13	27	209	264	−55	71
7	Ottawa Senators	82	28	43	11	26	221	291	−70	67
8	Buffalo Sabres	82	25	45	12	24	199	280	−81	62

Source: National Hockey League
x – Clinched playoff spot; z – Clinched conference

Eastern Conference Wild Card
Pos	Div	Team	GP	W	L	OTL	ROW	GF	GA	GD	Pts
1	ME	x – Columbus Blue Jackets	82	45	30	7	39	242	230	+12	97
2	ME	x – New Jersey Devils	82	44	29	9	39	248	244	+4	97
3	AT	Florida Panthers	82	44	30	8	41	248	246	+2	96
4	ME	Carolina Hurricanes	82	36	35	11	33	228	256	−28	83
5	ME	New York Islanders	82	35	37	10	32	264	296	−32	80
6	ME	New York Rangers	82	34	39	9	31	231	268	−37	77
7	AT	Detroit Red Wings	82	30	39	13	25	217	255	−38	73
8	AT	Montreal Canadiens	82	29	40	13	27	209	264	−55	71
9	AT	Ottawa Senators	82	28	43	11	26	221	291	−70	67
10	AT	Buffalo Sabres	82	25	45	12	24	199	280	−81	62

Source: National Hockey League
x – Clinched playoff spot

== Off-season ==
General manager Tim Murray and head coach Dan Bylsma were both fired at the end of the previous season. Two former Sabres players were hired in their places: Jason Botterill, at the time a front office executive with the Pittsburgh Penguins, was hired as general manager, while Hockey Hall of Fame defenseman Phil Housley, at the time defensive coordinator for the Nashville Predators, was named head coach.

The Sabres once again held a summer development camp during the second week of July. In contrast to the previous two seasons, no full Blue/White game was played; the four-team three-on-three tournament was reprised. Team White, led by 2017 first-round draft pick Casey Mittelstadt, won the tournament. The team will host its third annual Prospects Challenge in September; the tournament will expand to four teams, with the Pittsburgh Penguins joining the returning Sabres, New Jersey Devils and Boston Bruins in the tournament.

== Schedule and results ==
=== Preseason ===
The Sabres released their preseason schedule on June 19, 2017.

2017 preseason game log: 1–4–1 (Home: 1–2–1; Road: 0–2–0)
#	Date	Visitor	Score	Home	OT	Decision	Attendance	Record	Recap
1	September 18	Carolina	3–2	Buffalo	OT	Ullmark	16,310	0–0–1	Recap
2	September 19^{[a]}	Pittsburgh	3–4	Buffalo	OT	–	–	1–0–1	Recap
3	September 22^{[b]}	Buffalo	0–3	Toronto		–	–	1–1–1	Recap
4	September 23	Toronto	3–1	Buffalo		Lehner	17,345	1–2–1	Recap
5	September 27	Buffalo	4–5	Pittsburgh		Johnson	17,693	1–3–1	Recap
6	September 29	NY Islanders	3–1	Buffalo		Lehner	16,967	1–4–1	Recap
Notes:^{a} Game was played at Pegula Ice Arena in University Park, Pennsylvania.^{b} Game was played at Ricoh Coliseum in Toronto, Ontario.

=== Regular season ===
The team's regular season schedule was published on June 22, 2017.

2017–18 game log

October: 3–7–2 (Home: 1–3–1; Road: 2–4–1)
#	Date	Visitor	Score	Home	OT	Decision	Attendance	Record	Pts	Recap
1	October 5	Montreal	3–2	Buffalo	SO	Lehner	19,070	0–0–1	1	Recap
2	October 7	Buffalo	3–6	NY Islanders		Lehner	15,234	0–1–1	1	Recap
3	October 9	New Jersey	6–2	Buffalo		Johnson	17,697	0–2–1	1	Recap
4	October 12	Buffalo	2–3	San Jose		Lehner	17,402	0–3–1	1	Recap
5	October 14	Buffalo	2–4	Los Angeles		Lehner	18,230	0–4–1	1	Recap
6	October 15	Buffalo	3–1	Anaheim		Johnson	15,821	1–4–1	3	Recap
7	October 17	Buffalo	4–5	Vegas	OT	Johnson	17,617	1–4–2	4	Recap
8	October 20	Vancouver	4–2	Buffalo		Johnson	18,050	1–5–2	4	Recap
9	October 21	Buffalo	5–4	Boston	OT	Lehner	17,565	2–5–2	6	Recap
10	October 24	Detroit	0–1	Buffalo		Lehner	16,882	3–5–2	8	Recap
11	October 25	Buffalo	1–5	Columbus		Johnson	14,383	3–6–2	8	Recap
12	October 28	San Jose	3–2	Buffalo		Lehner	18,892	3–7–2	8	Recap

November: 3–8–2 (Home: 2–5–0; Road: 1–3–2)
#	Date	Visitor	Score	Home	OT	Decision	Attendance	Record	Pts	Recap
13	November 2	Buffalo	5–4	Arizona		Lehner	11,477	4–7–2	10	Recap
14	November 4	Buffalo	1–5	Dallas		Lehner	18,236	4–8–2	10	Recap
15	November 7	Washington	1–3	Buffalo		Lehner	17,146	5–8–2	12	Recap
16	November 10	Florida	4–1	Buffalo		Lehner	17,812	5–9–2	12	Recap
17	November 11	Buffalo	1–2	Montreal	OT	Johnson	21,302	5–9–3	13	Recap
18	November 14	Buffalo	4–5	Pittsburgh	OT	Lehner	18,438	5–9–4	14	Recap
19	November 17	Buffalo	1–3	Detroit		Lehner	19,515	5–10–4	14	Recap
20	November 18	Carolina	3–1	Buffalo		Johnson	18,028	5–11–4	14	Recap
21	November 20	Columbus	3–2	Buffalo		Lehner	16,551	5–12–4	14	Recap
22	November 22	Minnesota	5–4	Buffalo		Lehner	17,418	5–13–4	14	Recap
23	November 24	Edmonton	1–3	Buffalo		Lehner	19,070	6–13–4	16	Recap
24	November 25	Buffalo	0–3	Montreal		Lehner	21,302	6–14–4	16	Recap
25	November 28	Tampa Bay	2–0	Buffalo		Lehner	17,569	6–15–4	16	Recap

December: 4–5–4 (Home: 2–2–1; Road: 2–3–3)
#	Date	Visitor	Score	Home	OT	Decision	Attendance	Record	Pts	Recap
26	December 1	Pittsburgh	4–0	Buffalo		Lehner	19,070	6–16–4	16	Recap
27	December 2	Buffalo	1–5	Pittsburgh		Johnson	18,582	6–17–4	16	Recap
28	December 5	Buffalo	4–2	Colorado		Lehner	13,258	7–17–4	18	Recap
29	December 8	Buffalo	2–3	Chicago	OT	Lehner	21,542	7–17–5	19	Recap
30	December 10	Buffalo	2–3	St. Louis	OT	Lehner	17,310	7–17–6	20	Recap
31	December 12	Ottawa	2–3	Buffalo		Lehner	17,454	8–17–6	22	Recap
32	December 14	Buffalo	1–2	Philadelphia		Lehner	19,508	8–18–6	22	Recap
33	December 15	Carolina	5–4	Buffalo	OT	Johnson	17,610	8–18–7	23	Recap
34	December 19	Boston	3–0	Buffalo		Lehner	17,811	8–19–7	23	Recap
35	December 22	Philadelphia	2–4	Buffalo		Lehner	18,222	9–19–7	25	Recap
36	December 23	Buffalo	2–4	Carolina		Johnson	14,470	9–20–7	25	Recap
37	December 27	Buffalo	2–3	NY Islanders	OT	Lehner	15,027	9–20–8	26	Recap
38	December 29	Buffalo	4–3	New Jersey	OT	Lehner	16,514	10–20–8	28	Recap

January: 4–7–1 (Home: 1–3–1; Road: 3–4–0)
#	Date	Visitor	Score	Home	OT	Decision	Attendance	Record	Pts	Recap
39	January 1	NY Rangers	3–2	Buffalo	OT	Lehner	41,821 (outdoors)	10–20–9	29	Recap
40	January 4	Buffalo	2–6	Minnesota		Lehner	19,017	10–21–9	29	Recap
41	January 5	Buffalo	3–4	Winnipeg		Johnson	15,321	10–22–9	29	Recap
42	January 7	Buffalo	1–4	Philadelphia		Lehner	19,662	10–23–9	29	Recap
43	January 9	Winnipeg	7–4	Buffalo		Johnson	17,398	10–24–9	29	Recap
44	January 11	Columbus	1–3	Buffalo		Ullmark	18,071	11–24–9	31	Recap
45	January 18	Buffalo	3–4	NY Rangers		Lehner	18,006	11–25–9	31	Recap
46	January 20	Dallas	7–1	Buffalo		Lehner	19,070	11–26–9	31	Recap
47	January 22	Buffalo	2–1	Calgary	OT	Johnson	18,349	12–26–9	33	Recap
48	January 23	Buffalo	5–0	Edmonton		Lehner	18,347	13–26–9	35	Recap
49	January 25	Buffalo	4–0	Vancouver		Lehner	18,340	14–26–9	37	Recap
50	January 30	New Jersey	3–1	Buffalo		Lehner	17,460	14–27–9	37	Recap

February: 6–6–2 (Home: 3–5–1; Road: 3–1–1)
#	Date	Visitor	Score	Home	OT	Decision	Attendance	Record	Pts	Recap
51	February 1	Florida	4–2	Buffalo		Johnson	16,707	14–28–9	37	Recap
52	February 3	St. Louis	1–0	Buffalo		Lehner	18,777	14–29–9	37	Recap
53	February 6	Anaheim	4–3	Buffalo	OT	Lehner	16,788	14–29–10	38	Recap
54	February 8	NY Islanders	3–4	Buffalo		Lehner	16,872	15–29–10	40	Recap
55	February 10	Buffalo	4–2	Boston		Johnson	17,565	16–29–10	42	Recap
56	February 11	Colorado	5–4	Buffalo		Lehner	17,646	16–30–10	42	Recap
57	February 13	Tampa Bay	3–5	Buffalo		Johnson	16,530	17–30–10	44	Recap
58	February 15	Buffalo	2–3	Ottawa	OT	Lehner	13,371	17–30–11	45	Recap
59	February 17	Los Angeles	4–2	Buffalo		Lehner	18,632	17–31–11	45	Recap
60	February 19	Washington	3–2	Buffalo		Johnson	18,228	17–32–11	45	Recap
61	February 22	Buffalo	3–2	Detroit	OT	Lehner	19,515	18–32–11	47	Recap
62	February 24	Buffalo	1–5	Washington		Lehner	18,506	18–33–11	47	Recap
63	February 25	Boston	1–4	Buffalo		Johnson	18,522	19–33–11	49	Recap
64	February 28	Buffalo	2–1	Tampa Bay	OT	Johnson	19,092	20–33–11	51	Recap

March: 5–8–1 (Home: 2–6–1; Road: 3–2–0)
#	Date	Visitor	Score	Home	OT	Decision	Attendance	Record	Pts	Recap
65	March 2	Buffalo	1–4	Florida		Lehner	12,759	20–34–11	51	Recap
66	March 5	Toronto	3–5	Buffalo		Johnson	18,705	21–34–11	53	Recap
67	March 7	Calgary	5–1	Buffalo		Johnson	17,773	21–35–11	53	Recap
68	March 8	Buffalo	4–3	Ottawa	SO	Lehner	13,377	22–35–11	55	Recap
69	March 10	Vegas	2–1	Buffalo	SO	Lehner	19,070	22–35–12	56	Recap
70	March 15	Toronto	5–2	Buffalo		Lehner	19,070	22–36–12	56	Recap
71	March 17	Chicago	3–5	Buffalo		Johnson	19,070	23–36–12	58	Recap
72	March 19	Nashville	4–0	Buffalo		Ullmark	17,507	23–37–12	58	Recap
73	March 21	Arizona	4–1	Buffalo		Johnson	17,029	23–38–12	58	Recap
74	March 23	Montreal	3–0	Buffalo		Ullmark	18,594	23–39–12	58	Recap
75	March 24	Buffalo	1–5	NY Rangers		Lehner	18,006	23–40–12	58	Recap
76	March 26	Buffalo	3–2	Toronto		Johnson	19,108	24–40–12	60	Recap
77	March 29	Detroit	6–3	Buffalo		Johnson	18,493	24–41–12	60	Recap
78	March 31	Buffalo	7–4	Nashville		Johnson	17,551	25–41–12	62	Recap

April: 0–4–0 (Home: 0–1–0; Road: 0–3–0)
#	Date	Visitor	Score	Home	OT	Decision	Attendance	Record	Pts	Recap
79	April 2	Buffalo	2–5	Toronto		Johnson	18,846	25–42–12	62	Recap
80	April 4	Ottawa	4–2	Buffalo		Johnson	18,919	25–43–12	62	Recap
81	April 6	Buffalo	5–7	Tampa Bay		Johnson	19,092	25–44–12	62	Recap
82	April 7	Buffalo	3–4	Florida		Wilcox	16,254	25–45–12	62	Recap

Legend: Win (2 points) Loss (0 points) Overtime/shootout loss (1 point)

== Player statistics ==
Final stats.

Skaters

Regular season
Player	GP	G	A	Pts	+/−	PIM
Jack Eichel	67	25	39	64	−25	32
Ryan O'Reilly	81	24	37	61	−23	2
Sam Reinhart	82	25	25	50	−24	26
Kyle Okposo	76	15	29	44	−34	40
Rasmus Ristolainen	73	6	35	41	−25	48
Evander Kane^{‡}	61	20	20	40	−14	57
Jason Pominville	82	16	18	34	−17	8
Evan Rodrigues	48	7	18	25	−10	14
Marco Scandella	82	5	17	22	−15	37
Benoit Pouliot	74	13	6	19	−8	22
Johan Larsson	80	4	13	17	−30	49
Zemgus Girgensons	71	7	8	15	−12	26
Scott Wilson^{†}	49	6	8	14	−17	8
Jake McCabe	53	3	9	12	−11	26
Viktor Antipin	47	0	10	10	−9	18
Nathan Beaulieu	59	1	8	9	−19	36
Jordan Nolan	69	4	4	8	−13	69
Casey Nelson	37	3	5	8	−14	8
Nicholas Baptiste	33	4	2	6	−4	14
Casey Mittelstadt	6	1	4	5	1	2
Brendan Guhle	18	0	5	5	−6	10
Justin Bailey	12	3	1	4	−2	2
Jacob Josefson	39	2	2	4	−4	6
Seth Griffith	21	2	1	3	−6	6
Justin Falk	46	1	1	2	−16	28
Josh Gorges	34	0	2	2	−4	17
Alexander Nylander	3	1	0	1	−3	0
Taylor Fedun	7	0	1	1	−1	2
Zach Bogosian	18	0	1	1	−9	20
Matt Tennyson	15	0	0	0	−8	8
Zach Redmond	3	0	0	0	1	2
Matt Moulson	14	0	0	0	−9	2
Kyle Criscuolo	9	0	0	0	−4	4
Hudson Fasching	5	0	0	0	−1	2
Danny O'Regan^{†}	2	0	0	0	1	0

Goaltenders

Regular season
Player	GP	GS	TOI	W	L	OT	GA	GAA	SA	SV%	SO	G	A	PIM
Robin Lehner	53	50	2,852:01	14	26	9	143	3.01	1,560	.908	3	0	0	2
Chad Johnson	36	29	1,773:32	10	16	3	105	3.55	962	.891	0	0	0	0
Linus Ullmark	5	3	240:18	1	2	0	8	2.00	123	.935	0	0	0	0
Adam Wilcox	1	0	38:39	0	1	0	0	0.00	14	1.000	0	0	0	0

^{†}Denotes player spent time with another team before joining the Sabres. Stats reflect time with the Sabres only.
^{‡}Denotes player was traded mid-season. Stats reflect time with the Sabres only.
Bold/italics denotes franchise record.

== Transactions ==
The Sabres have been involved in the following transactions during the 2017–18 season.

=== Trades ===
Date	Details		Ref
June 17, 2017	To Montreal Canadiens 3rd-round pick in 2017	To Buffalo Sabres Nathan Beaulieu
June 21, 2017	To Vegas Golden Knights 6th-round pick in 2017	To Buffalo Sabres Expansion draft considerations^{[a]}
June 30, 2017	To Minnesota Wild Tyler Ennis; Marcus Foligno; 3rd-round pick in 2018	To Buffalo Sabres season Jason Pominville; Marco Scandella; 4th-round pick in 2018
October 4, 2017	To Montreal Canadiens Nicolas Deslauriers	To Buffalo Sabres Zach Redmond
December 4, 2017	To Detroit Red Wings 5th-round pick in 2019	To Buffalo Sabres Scott Wilson
February 26, 2018	To San Jose Sharks Evander Kane	To Buffalo Sabres Danny O'Regan; Conditional 1st-round in 2019; Conditional 4th-round pick in 2020
June 14, 2018	To Arizona Coyotes Hudson Fasching	To Buffalo Sabres Rights to Brandon Hickey; Rights to Mike Sislo

Notes:

1. The Vegas Golden Knights selected William Carrier in the 2017 NHL expansion draft. The draft pick was exchanged so that the Golden Knights would not select Linus Ullmark.

=== Free agents acquired ===
Date	Player	Former team	Contract terms (in U.S. dollars)	Ref
July 1, 2017	Kyle Criscuolo	Grand Rapids Griffins	2-year, $1.3 million	
July 1, 2017	Seth Griffith	Toronto Maple Leafs	1-year, $650,000	
July 1, 2017	Chad Johnson	Arizona Coyotes	1-year, $2.5 million	
July 1, 2017	Jacob Josefson	New Jersey Devils	1-year, $700,000	
July 1, 2017	Kevin Porter	Pittsburgh Penguins	2-year, $1.3 million	
July 1, 2017	Benoit Pouliot	Edmonton Oilers	1-year, $1.15 million	
July 1, 2017	Matt Tennyson	Carolina Hurricanes	2-year, $1.3 million	
July 1, 2017	Adam Wilcox	Florida Panthers	1-year, $650,000	
April 11, 2018	Andrew Oglevie	University of Notre Dame	2-year, $1.85 million entry-level contract	
May 15, 2018	Lawrence Pilut	HV71	2-year, $2.7 million entry-level contract	

=== Free agents lost ===
Date	Player	New team	Contract terms (in U.S. dollars)	Ref
July 1, 2017	Mat Bodie	Tampa Bay Lightning	1-year	
July 1, 2017	Erik Burgdoerfer	Ottawa Senators	2-year, $1.3 million	
July 1, 2017	Derek Grant	Anaheim Ducks	1-year, $650,000	
July 1, 2017	Dmitry Kulikov	Winnipeg Jets	3-year	
July 1, 2017	Anders Nilsson	Vancouver Canucks	2-year, $5 million	
July 1, 2017	Cal O'Reilly	Minnesota Wild	2-year, $1.4 million	
July 1, 2017	Cole Schneider	New York Rangers	2-year, $1.3 million	
July 1, 2017	Jean Dupuy	Toronto Marlies	Unknown	
July 20, 2017	Justin Kea	Florida Everblades	1-year	
October 18, 2017	Brian Gionta	Team USA	Through Olympics, $0	
April 27, 2018	Jacob Josefson	Djurgårdens IF	4-year	
June 13, 2018	Zach Redmond	Rochester Americans	2-year	

=== Claimed via waivers ===
Player	Previous team	Date	Ref
Jordan Nolan	Los Angeles Kings	September 27, 2017	

=== Lost via waivers ===
Player	New team	Date	Ref

=== Players released ===
Date	Player	Via	Ref

=== Lost via retirement ===
Date	Player	Ref

=== Player signings ===
Date	Player	Contract terms (in U.S. dollars)	Ref
June 26, 2017	Taylor Fedun	2-year, $1.3 million, two-way contract	
July 8, 2017	Johan Larsson	2-year, $2.95 million	
July 25, 2017	Robin Lehner	1-year, $4 million	
July 27, 2017	Evan Rodrigues	2-year, $1.3 million	
July 31, 2017	Nathan Beaulieu	2-year, $4.8 million	
August 17, 2017	Zemgus Girgensons	2-year, $3.2 million	
October 4, 2017	Jack Eichel	8-year, $80 million contract extension	
October 23, 2017	Cliff Pu	3-year, $2.775 million entry-level contract	
March 25, 2018	Will Borgen	3-year, $2.775 million entry-level contract	
March 26, 2018	Casey Mittelstadt	3-year, $4.475 million entry-level contract	
April 24, 2018	Victor Olofsson	2-year, $1.85 million entry-level contract	
May 2, 2018	Casey Nelson	2-year, $1.625 million contract extension	
May 23, 2018	Rasmus Asplund	3-year, $2.775 million entry-level contract	
June 14, 2018	Ukko-Pekka Luukkonen	3-year, $2.775 million entry-level contract	

== Draft picks ==
Below are the Buffalo Sabres' selections at the 2017 NHL entry draft, which was held on June 23 and 24, 2017 at the United Center in Chicago.

Round	#	Player	Pos	Nationality	College/Junior/Club team (League)
1	8	Casey Mittelstadt	C	United States	Green Bay Gamblers (USHL)
2	37	Marcus Davidsson	C	Sweden	Djurgårdens IF (SHL)
2	54^{1}	Ukko-Pekka Luukkonen	G	Finland	HPK U20 (Jr. A SM-liiga)
3	89^{2}	Oskari Laaksonen	D	Finland	Ilves U20 (Jr. A SM-liiga)
4	99	Jacob Bryson	D	Canada	Providence College (Hockey East)
7	192	Linus Weissbach	LW	Sweden	Tri-City Storm (USHL)

Draft notes:

1. The Minnesota Wild's second-round pick went to the Buffalo Sabres as the result of a trade on March 2, 2015, that sent Chris Stewart to Minnesota in exchange for this pick.
2. The Washington Capitals' third-round pick went to the Buffalo Sabres as the result of a trade on February 23, 2016, that sent Mike Weber to Washington in exchange for this pick.
