= 2017–18 San Jose Sharks season =

National Hockey League team season

2017–18 San Jose Sharks
- Division: 3rd Pacific
- Conference: 6th Western
- 2017–18 record: 45–27–10
- Home record: 25–13–3
- Road record: 20–14–7
- Goals for: 252
- Goals against: 229

Team information
- General manager: Doug Wilson
- Coach: Peter DeBoer
- Captain: Joe Pavelski
- Alternate captains: Logan Couture; Joe Thornton
- Arena: SAP Center
- Average attendance: 17,365
- Minor league affiliates: San Jose Barracuda (AHL); Allen Americans (ECHL)

Team leaders
- Goals: Logan Couture (34)
- Assists: Brent Burns (55)
- Points: Brent Burns (67)
- Penalty minutes: Brenden Dillon (60)
- Plus/minus: Joakim Ryan (+13)
- Wins: Martin Jones (30)
- Goals against average: Martin Jones (2.55)

The 2017–18 San Jose Sharks season was the 27th season for the National Hockey League (NHL) franchise that was established on May 9, 1990.

== Standings ==
Pacific Division
| Pos | Team | GP | W | L | OTL | ROW | GF | GA | GD | Pts |
|---|---|---|---|---|---|---|---|---|---|---|
| 1 | y – Vegas Golden Knights | 82 | 51 | 24 | 7 | 47 | 272 | 228 | +44 | 109 |
| 2 | x – Anaheim Ducks | 82 | 44 | 25 | 13 | 40 | 235 | 216 | +19 | 101 |
| 3 | x – San Jose Sharks | 82 | 45 | 27 | 10 | 40 | 252 | 229 | +23 | 100 |
| 4 | x – Los Angeles Kings | 82 | 45 | 29 | 8 | 43 | 239 | 203 | +36 | 98 |
| 5 | Calgary Flames | 82 | 37 | 35 | 10 | 35 | 218 | 248 | −30 | 84 |
| 6 | Edmonton Oilers | 82 | 36 | 40 | 6 | 31 | 234 | 263 | −29 | 78 |
| 7 | Vancouver Canucks | 82 | 31 | 40 | 11 | 31 | 218 | 264 | −46 | 73 |
| 8 | Arizona Coyotes | 82 | 29 | 41 | 12 | 27 | 208 | 256 | −48 | 70 |

Source: National Hockey League
x – Clinched playoff spot; y – Clinched division

== Schedule ==
=== Preseason ===
The preseason schedule was announced on June 15, 2017.

Preseason game log: 4–2–0 (Home: 2–1–0; Road: 2–1–0)
| # | Date | Visitor | Score | Home | OT | Decision | Attendance | Record | Recap |
|---|---|---|---|---|---|---|---|---|---|
| 1 | September 19 | Anaheim | 0–5 | San Jose | | Dell | 15,032 | 1–0–0 | Recap |
| 2 | September 21 | Vegas | 2–5 | San Jose | | Jones | 15,071 | 2–0–0 | Recap |
| 3 | September 23 | San Jose | 5–4 | Arizona | SO | Grosenick | 6,703 | 3–0–0 | Recap |
| 4 | September 28 | San Jose | 0–3 | Anaheim | | Jones | 15,439 | 3–1–0 | Recap |
| 5 | September 30 | Arizona | 4–0 | San Jose | | Jones | 16,761 | 3–2–0 | Recap |
| 6 | October 1 | San Jose | 5–3 | Vegas | | Grosenick | 16,479 | 4–2–0 | Recap |

=== Regular season ===
The regular season schedule was announced on June 22, 2017.

Game log: 45–27–10 (Home: 25–13–3; Road: 20–14–7)

October: 6–5–0 (Home: 3–3–0; Road: 3–2–0)
| # | Date | Visitor | Score | Home | OT | Decision | Attendance | Record | Pts | Recap |
|---|---|---|---|---|---|---|---|---|---|---|
| 1 | October 4 | Philadelphia | 5–3 | San Jose | | Jones | 17,562 | 0–1–0 | 0 | Recap |
| 2 | October 7 | Los Angeles | 4–1 | San Jose | | Jones | 17,562 | 0–2–0 | 0 | Recap |
| 3 | October 12 | Buffalo | 2–3 | San Jose | | Jones | 17,402 | 1–2–0 | 2 | Recap |
| 4 | October 14 | NY Islanders | 3–1 | San Jose | | Dell | 17,562 | 1–3–0 | 2 | Recap |
| 5 | October 17 | Montreal | 2–5 | San Jose | | Jones | 17,377 | 2–3–0 | 4 | Recap |
| 6 | October 20 | San Jose | 3–0 | New Jersey | | Jones | 14,381 | 3–3–0 | 6 | Recap |
| 7 | October 21 | San Jose | 3–5 | NY Islanders | | Dell | 11,877 | 3–4–0 | 6 | Recap |
| 8 | October 23 | San Jose | 4–1 | NY Rangers | | Jones | 18,006 | 4–4–0 | 8 | Recap |
| 9 | October 26 | San Jose | 1–2 | Boston | | Jones | 17,565 | 4–5–0 | 8 | Recap |
| 10 | October 28 | San Jose | 3–2 | Buffalo | | Dell | 18,892 | 5–5–0 | 10 | Recap |
| 11 | October 30 | Toronto | 2–3 | San Jose | | Jones | 17,562 | 6–5–0 | 12 | Recap |

November: 7–3–2 (Home: 4–3–1; Road: 3–0–1)
| # | Date | Visitor | Score | Home | OT | Decision | Attendance | Record | Pts | Recap |
|---|---|---|---|---|---|---|---|---|---|---|
| 12 | November 1 | Nashville | 1–4 | San Jose | | Jones | 16,543 | 7–5–0 | 14 | Recap |
| 13 | November 4 | Anaheim | 1–2 | San Jose | SO | Jones | 17,562 | 8–5–0 | 16 | Recap |
| 14 | November 8 | Tampa Bay | 5–1 | San Jose | | Jones | 17,044 | 8–6–0 | 16 | Recap |
| 15 | November 11 | Vancouver | 0–5 | San Jose | | Dell | 17,562 | 9–6–0 | 18 | Recap |
| 16 | November 12 | San Jose | 2–1 | Los Angeles | | Jones | 18,230 | 10–6–0 | 20 | Recap |
| 17 | November 16 | Florida | 2–0 | San Jose | | Jones | 16,411 | 10–7–0 | 20 | Recap |
| 18 | November 18 | Boston | 3–1 | San Jose | | Dell | 17,442 | 10–8–0 | 20 | Recap |
| 19 | November 20 | Anaheim | 3–2 | San Jose | SO | Jones | 17,257 | 10–8–1 | 21 | Recap |
| 20 | November 22 | San Jose | 3–1 | Arizona | | Jones | 11,214 | 11–8–1 | 23 | Recap |
| 21 | November 24 | San Jose | 4–5 | Vegas | OT | Dell | 18,094 | 11–8–2 | 24 | Recap |
| 22 | November 25 | Winnipeg | 0–4 | San Jose | | Jones | 17,189 | 12–8–2 | 26 | Recap |
| 23 | November 28 | San Jose | 3–1 | Philadelphia | | Dell | 18,935 | 13–8–2 | 28 | Recap |

December: 7–4–2 (Home: 5–0–1; Road: 2–4–1)
| # | Date | Visitor | Score | Home | OT | Decision | Attendance | Record | Pts | Recap |
|---|---|---|---|---|---|---|---|---|---|---|
| 24 | December 1 | San Jose | 2–1 | Florida | | Dell | 12,323 | 14–8–2 | 30 | Recap |
| 25 | December 2 | San Jose | 2–5 | Tampa Bay | | Jones | 19,092 | 14–9–2 | 30 | Recap |
| 26 | December 4 | San Jose | 1–4 | Washington | | Jones | 18,506 | 14–10–2 | 30 | Recap |
| 27 | December 7 | Carolina | 4–5 | San Jose | OT | Jones | 16,947 | 15–10–2 | 32 | Recap |
| 28 | December 9 | Ottawa | 0–5 | San Jose | | Dell | 17,562 | 16–10–2 | 34 | Recap |
| 29 | December 10 | Minnesota | 4–3 | San Jose | OT | Jones | 17,205 | 16–10–3 | 35 | Recap |
| 30 | December 14 | San Jose | 3–2 | Calgary | | Dell | 18,730 | 17–10–3 | 37 | Recap |
| 31 | December 15 | San Jose | 3–4 | Vancouver | OT | Jones | 17,278 | 17–10–4 | 38 | Recap |
| 32 | December 18 | San Jose | 3–5 | Edmonton | | Jones | 18,347 | 17–11–4 | 38 | Recap |
| 33 | December 21 | Vancouver | 4–5 | San Jose | OT | Dell | 17,562 | 18–11–4 | 40 | Recap |
| 34 | December 23 | Los Angeles | 0–2 | San Jose | | Jones | 17,562 | 19–11–4 | 42 | Recap |
| 35 | December 28 | Calgary | 2–3 | San Jose | SO | Jones | 17,562 | 20–11–4 | 44 | Recap |
| 36 | December 31 | San Jose | 0–6 | Dallas | | Jones | 18,532 | 20–12–4 | 44 | Recap |

January: 6–4–4 (Home: 2–1–1; Road: 4–3–3)
| # | Date | Visitor | Score | Home | OT | Decision | Attendance | Record | Pts | Recap |
|---|---|---|---|---|---|---|---|---|---|---|
| 37 | January 2 | San Jose | 4–1 | Montreal | | Dell | 21,302 | 21–12–4 | 46 | Recap |
| 38 | January 4 | San Jose | 2–3 | Toronto | SO | Jones | 19,132 | 21–12–5 | 47 | Recap |
| 39 | January 5 | San Jose | 5–6 | Ottawa | OT | Dell | 16,061 | 21–12–6 | 48 | Recap |
| 40 | January 7 | San Jose | 1–4 | Winnipeg | | Jones | 15,321 | 21–13–6 | 48 | Recap |
| 41 | January 13 | Arizona | 5–6 | San Jose | OT | Dell | 17,562 | 22–13–6 | 50 | Recap |
| 42 | January 15 | San Jose | 4–1 | Los Angeles | | Jones | 18,230 | 23–13–6 | 52 | Recap |
| 43 | January 16 | San Jose | 3–2 | Arizona | SO | Dell | 11,961 | 24–13–6 | 54 | Recap |
| 44 | January 18 | San Jose | 3–5 | Colorado | | Jones | 14,349 | 24–14–6 | 54 | Recap |
| 45 | January 20 | Pittsburgh | 1–2 | San Jose | | Dell | 17,562 | 25–14–6 | 56 | Recap |
| 46 | January 21 | San Jose | 6–2 | Anaheim | | Dell | 17,347 | 26–14–6 | 58 | Recap |
| 47 | January 23 | Winnipeg | 5–4 | San Jose | OT | Dell | 17,237 | 26–14–7 | 59 | Recap |
| 48 | January 25 | NY Rangers | 6–5 | San Jose | | Dell | 17,477 | 26–15–7 | 59 | Recap |
| 49 | January 30 | San Jose | 2–5 | Pittsburgh | | Jones | 18,469 | 26–16–7 | 59 | Recap |
| 50 | January 31 | San Jose | 1–2 | Detroit | SO | Jones | 19,515 | 26–16–8 | 60 | Recap |

February: 8–5–1 (Home: 4–2–0; Road: 4–3–1)
| # | Date | Visitor | Score | Home | OT | Decision | Attendance | Record | Pts | Recap |
|---|---|---|---|---|---|---|---|---|---|---|
| 51 | February 2 | San Jose | 3–1 | Columbus | | Jones | 16,867 | 27–16–8 | 62 | Recap |
| 52 | February 4 | San Jose | 3–1 | Carolina | | Dell | 11,614 | 28–16–8 | 64 | Recap |
| 53 | February 6 | San Jose | 1–3 | Colorado | | Jones | 13,349 | 28–17–8 | 64 | Recap |
| 54 | February 8 | Vegas | 5–3 | San Jose | | Jones | 17,562 | 28–18–8 | 64 | Recap |
| 55 | February 10 | Edmonton | 4–6 | San Jose | | Dell | 17,562 | 29–18–8 | 66 | Recap |
| 56 | February 11 | San Jose | 3–2 | Anaheim | SO | Jones | 17,435 | 30–18–8 | 68 | Recap |
| 57 | February 13 | Arizona | 2–1 | San Jose | | Jones | 17,125 | 30–19–8 | 68 | Recap |
| 58 | February 15 | Vancouver | 1–4 | San Jose | | Jones | 17,274 | 31–19–8 | 70 | Recap |
| 59 | February 18 | Dallas | 2–5 | San Jose | | Jones | 17,562 | 32–19–8 | 72 | Recap |
| 60 | February 20 | San Jose | 3–2 | St. Louis | | Jones | 17,297 | 33–19–8 | 74 | Recap |
| 61 | February 22 | San Jose | 1–7 | Nashville | | Dell | 17,354 | 33–20–8 | 74 | Recap |
| 62 | February 23 | San Jose | 1–3 | Chicago | | Jones | 21,906 | 33–21–8 | 74 | Recap |
| 63 | February 25 | San Jose | 2–3 | Minnesota | OT | Jones | 19,105 | 33–21–9 | 75 | Recap |
| 64 | February 27 | Edmonton | 2–5 | San Jose | | Jones | 17,327 | 34–21–9 | 77 | Recap |

March: 10–4–1 (Home: 6–2–0; Road: 4–2–1)
| # | Date | Visitor | Score | Home | OT | Decision | Attendance | Record | Pts | Recap |
|---|---|---|---|---|---|---|---|---|---|---|
| 65 | March 1 | Chicago | 2–7 | San Jose | | Jones | 17,086 | 35–21–9 | 79 | Recap |
| 66 | March 4 | Columbus | 4–2 | San Jose | | Jones | 17,211 | 35–22–9 | 79 | Recap |
| 67 | March 8 | St. Louis | 0–2 | San Jose | | Jones | 17,400 | 36–22–9 | 81 | Recap |
| 68 | March 10 | Washington | 2–0 | San Jose | | Jones | 17,562 | 36–23–9 | 81 | Recap |
| 69 | March 12 | Detroit | 3–5 | San Jose | | Jones | 17,199 | 37–23–9 | 83 | Recap |
| 70 | March 14 | San Jose | 4–3 | Edmonton | OT | Jones | 18,347 | 38–23–9 | 85 | Recap |
| 71 | March 16 | San Jose | 7–4 | Calgary | | Jones | 19,196 | 39–23–9 | 87 | Recap |
| 72 | March 17 | San Jose | 5–3 | Vancouver | | Dell | 18,332 | 40–23–9 | 89 | Recap |
| 73 | March 20 | New Jersey | 2–6 | San Jose | | Jones | 17,209 | 41–23–9 | 91 | Recap |
| 74 | March 22 | Vegas | 1–2 | San Jose | OT | Jones | 17,562 | 42–23–9 | 93 | Recap |
| 75 | March 24 | Calgary | 1–5 | San Jose | | Jones | 17,562 | 43–23–9 | 95 | Recap |
| 76 | March 26 | San Jose | 4–3 | Chicago | SO | Jones | 21,712 | 44–23–9 | 97 | Recap |
| 77 | March 27 | San Jose | 2–3 | St. Louis | OT | Dell | 18,947 | 44–23–10 | 98 | Recap |
| 78 | March 29 | San Jose | 3–5 | Nashville | | Jones | 17,543 | 44–24–10 | 98 | Recap |
| 79 | March 31 | San Jose | 2–3 | Vegas | | Jones | 18,458 | 44–25–10 | 98 | Recap |

April: 1–2–0 (Home: 1–2–0; Road: 0–0–0)
| # | Date | Visitor | Score | Home | OT | Decision | Attendance | Record | Pts | Recap |
|---|---|---|---|---|---|---|---|---|---|---|
| 80 | April 3 | Dallas | 4–2 | San Jose | | Jones | 17,451 | 44–26–10 | 98 | Recap |
| 81 | April 5 | Colorado | 2–4 | San Jose | | Jones | 17,497 | 45–26–10 | 100 | Recap |
| 82 | April 7 | Minnesota | 6–3 | San Jose | | Jones | 17,562 | 45–27–10 | 100 | Recap |

Legend: Win (2 points) Loss (0 points) Overtime/shootout loss (1 point)

=== Playoffs ===
The Sharks entered the playoffs as the Pacific Division's third seed and faced the second seed of the same division, the Anaheim Ducks. The Sharks swept the Ducks and were then defeated by the Vegas Golden Knights in six games in the conference semifinals.

2018 Stanley Cup playoffs

Western Conference First Round vs. (P2) Anaheim Ducks: San Jose won 4–0
| # | Date | Visitor | Score | Home | OT | Decision | Attendance | Series | Recap |
|---|---|---|---|---|---|---|---|---|---|
| 1 | April 12 | San Jose | 3–0 | Anaheim | | Jones | 17,174 | 1–0 | Recap |
| 2 | April 14 | San Jose | 3–2 | Anaheim | | Jones | 17,430 | 2–0 | Recap |
| 3 | April 16 | Anaheim | 1–8 | San Jose | | Jones | 17,562 | 3–0 | Recap |
| 4 | April 18 | Anaheim | 1–2 | San Jose | | Jones | 17,562 | 4–0 | Recap |

Western Conference Second Round vs. (P1) Vegas Golden Knights: Vegas won 4–2
| # | Date | Visitor | Score | Home | OT | Decision | Attendance | Series | Recap |
|---|---|---|---|---|---|---|---|---|---|
| 1 | April 26 | San Jose | 0–7 | Vegas | | Jones | 18,444 | 0–1 | Recap |
| 2 | April 28 | San Jose | 4–3 | Vegas | 2OT | Jones | 18,641 | 1–1 | Recap |
| 3 | April 30 | Vegas | 4–3 | San Jose | OT | Jones | 17,562 | 1–2 | Recap |
| 4 | May 2 | Vegas | 0–4 | San Jose | | Jones | 17,562 | 2–2 | Recap |
| 5 | May 4 | San Jose | 3–5 | Vegas | | Jones | 18,693 | 2–3 | Recap |
| 6 | May 6 | Vegas | 3–0 | San Jose | | Jones | 17,562 | 2–4 | Recap |

Legend Win Loss

== Player statistics ==
Skaters

Regular season
| Player | GP | G | A | Pts | +/− | PIM |
|---|---|---|---|---|---|---|
| Brent Burns | 82 | 12 | 55 | 67 | −16 | 46 |
| Joe Pavelski | 82 | 22 | 44 | 66 | 0 | 41 |
| Logan Couture | 78 | 34 | 27 | 61 | −2 | 18 |
| Tomas Hertl | 79 | 22 | 24 | 46 | −2 | 41 |
| Chris Tierney | 82 | 17 | 23 | 40 | 0 | 8 |
| Kevin Labanc | 77 | 11 | 29 | 40 | −6 | 32 |
| Mikkel Boedker | 74 | 15 | 22 | 37 | 0 | 12 |
| Timo Meier | 81 | 21 | 15 | 36 | +2 | 51 |
| Joe Thornton | 47 | 13 | 23 | 36 | −9 | 38 |
| Justin Braun | 81 | 5 | 28 | 33 | +7 | 28 |
| Joonas Donskoi | 66 | 14 | 18 | 32 | +10 | 26 |
| Marc-Edouard Vlasic | 81 | 11 | 21 | 32 | +9 | 34 |
| Brenden Dillon | 81 | 5 | 17 | 22 | −7 | 60 |
| Dylan DeMelo | 63 | 0 | 20 | 20 | −1 | 34 |
| Melker Karlsson | 71 | 8 | 11 | 19 | −5 | 26 |
| Evander Kane^{†} | 17 | 9 | 5 | 14 | +5 | 25 |
| Barclay Goodrow | 47 | 7 | 7 | 14 | +1 | 28 |
| Jannik Hansen | 46 | 2 | 12 | 14 | +2 | 15 |
| Joel Ward | 52 | 5 | 7 | 12 | −2 | 20 |
| Joakim Ryan | 62 | 3 | 9 | 12 | +13 | 8 |
| Tim Heed | 29 | 3 | 8 | 11 | 0 | 8 |
| Marcus Sorensen | 32 | 5 | 2 | 7 | −5 | 5 |
| Eric Fehr^{†} | 14 | 3 | 1 | 4 | +7 | 0 |
| Danny O'Regan^{‡} | 19 | 0 | 4 | 4 | 0 | 2 |
| Paul Martin | 14 | 0 | 2 | 2 | +3 | 2 |
| Ryan Carpenter^{‡} | 16 | 0 | 1 | 1 | +1 | 2 |
| Dylan Gambrell | 3 | 0 | 0 | 0 | −1 | 0 |

Playoffs
| Player | GP | G | A | Pts | +/− | PIM |
|---|---|---|---|---|---|---|
| Logan Couture | 10 | 4 | 8 | 12 | 0 | 4 |
| Tomas Hertl | 10 | 6 | 3 | 9 | +2 | 8 |
| Joe Pavelski | 10 | 2 | 6 | 8 | −3 | 8 |
| Brent Burns | 10 | 3 | 4 | 7 | −4 | 6 |
| Mikkel Boedker | 10 | 1 | 5 | 6 | +1 | 6 |
| Marcus Sorensen | 10 | 4 | 1 | 5 | +5 | 2 |
| Evander Kane | 9 | 4 | 1 | 5 | −5 | 23 |
| Timo Meier | 10 | 2 | 3 | 5 | −1 | 10 |
| Kevin Labanc | 10 | 1 | 4 | 5 | −1 | 2 |
| Joonas Donskoi | 9 | 2 | 2 | 4 | −1 | 0 |
| Brenden Dillon | 10 | 0 | 4 | 4 | +4 | 32 |
| Melker Karlsson | 10 | 0 | 3 | 3 | +2 | 2 |
| Eric Fehr | 10 | 1 | 1 | 2 | +3 | 6 |
| Marc-Edouard Vlasic | 10 | 0 | 2 | 2 | 0 | 6 |
| Chris Tierney | 10 | 0 | 2 | 2 | −2 | 2 |
| Justin Braun | 10 | 0 | 1 | 1 | +1 | 4 |
| Dylan DeMelo | 10 | 0 | 1 | 1 | +5 | 4 |
| Barclay Goodrow | 2 | 0 | 0 | 0 | 0 | 0 |
| Joakim Ryan | 3 | 0 | 0 | 0 | −2 | 0 |
| Paul Martin | 7 | 0 | 0 | 0 | −2 | 2 |

Goaltenders

Regular season
| Player | GP | GS | TOI | W | L | OT | GA | GAA | SA | SV% | SO | G | A | PIM |
|---|---|---|---|---|---|---|---|---|---|---|---|---|---|---|
| Martin Jones | 60 | 60 | 3,416 | 30 | 22 | 6 | 145 | 2.55 | 1,699 | .915 | 4 | 0 | 0 | 0 |
| Aaron Dell | 29 | 22 | 1,522 | 15 | 5 | 4 | 67 | 2.64 | 775 | .914 | 2 | 0 | 1 | 0 |

Playoffs
| Player | GP | GS | TOI | W | L | GA | GAA | SA | SV% | SO | G | A | PIM |
|---|---|---|---|---|---|---|---|---|---|---|---|---|---|
| Martin Jones | 10 | 10 | 585 | 6 | 4 | 22 | 2.26 | 304 | .928 | 2 | 0 | 0 | 0 |
| Aaron Dell | 2 | 0 | 47 | 0 | 0 | 2 | 2.55 | 28 | .929 | 0 | 0 | 0 | 0 |

^{†}Denotes player spent time with another team before joining the Sharks. Stats reflect time with the Sharks only.
^{‡}Traded/Waived mid-season

== Transactions ==
=== Trades ===
| Date | Details | | Ref |
|---|---|---|---|
| February 20, 2018 | To Toronto Maple Leafs 7th-round pick in 2020 | To San Jose Sharks Eric Fehr |
| February 25, 2018 | To Nashville Predators Brandon Bollig; Troy Grosenick | To San Jose Sharks 6th-round pick in 2018 |
| February 26, 2018 | To Buffalo Sabres Danny O'Regan; Conditional 1st-round pick in 2019; Conditional 4th-round pick in 2020 | To San Jose Sharks Evander Kane |
| June 14, 2018 | To Arizona Coyotes Adam Helewka | To San Jose Sharks Kyle Wood |
| June 19, 2018 | To Ottawa Senators Mikkel Boedker; Julius Bergman; 6th-round pick in 2020 | To San Jose Sharks Mike Hoffman; Cody Donaghey; 5th-round pick in 2020 |
| June 19, 2018 | To Florida Panthers Mike Hoffman; 7th-round pick in 2018 | To San Jose Sharks 2nd-round pick in 2019; 4th-round pick in 2018; 5th-round pick in 2018 |

=== Free agents acquired ===
| Date | Player | Former team | Contract terms (in U.S. dollars) | Ref |
|---|---|---|---|---|
| July 1, 2017 | Antoine Bibeau | Toronto Maple Leafs | 1-year, $650,000 | |
| July 4, 2017 | Brandon Bollig | Calgary Flames | 1-year, $650,000 | |
| July 13, 2017 | Josef Korenar | Lincoln Stars | 3-year, $2.18 million entry-level contract | |
| September 7, 2017 | Jacob Middleton | San Jose Barracuda | 3-year, $2.205 million entry-level contract | |
| September 11, 2017 | Brandon Mashinter | Chicago Blackhawks | 1-year, $650,000 | |
| December 28, 2017 | Jayden Halbgewachs | Medicine Hat Tigers | 3-year, $2.775 million entry-level contract | |
| March 2, 2018 | Vincent Praplan | EHC Kloten | 1-year, $1.35 million entry-level contract | |
| April 3, 2018 | Lukas Radil | Spartak Moscow | 1-year, $750,000 entry-level contract | |
| June 6, 2018 | Antti Suomela | JYP | 1-year, $1.35 million entry-level contract | |

=== Free agents lost ===
| Date | Player | New team | Contract terms (in U.S. dollars) | Ref |
|---|---|---|---|---|
| July 1, 2017 | Micheal Haley | Florida Panthers | 2-year, $1.65 million | |
| July 1, 2017 | Buddy Robinson | Winnipeg Jets | 1-year, $650,000 | |
| July 2, 2017 | Patrick Marleau | Toronto Maple Leafs | 3-year, $18.75 million | |
| July 4, 2017 | Nikita Jevpalovs | Dinamo Riga | Unknown | |
| July 5, 2017 | Zack Stortini | Charlotte Checkers | Unknown | |
| September 7, 2017 | Patrick McNally | Worcester Railers | 1-year | |
| October 3, 2017 | Mantas Armalis | Dinamo Riga | Unknown | |

=== Lost via waivers ===
| Player | New team | Date claimed off waivers |
|---|---|---|
| Ryan Carpenter | Vegas Golden Knights | December 13, 2017 |

=== Player signings ===
| Date | Player | Contract terms (in U.S. dollars) | Ref |
|---|---|---|---|
| July 1, 2017 | Martin Jones | 6-year, $34.5 million contract extension | |
| July 1, 2017 | Marc-Edouard Vlasic | 8-year, $56 million contract extension | |
| July 1, 2017 | Joe Thornton | 1-year, $8 million | |
| July 10, 2017 | Chris Tierney | 1-year, $735,000 | |
| July 13, 2017 | Rudolfs Balcers | 3-year, $2.775 million entry-level contract | |
| July 18, 2017 | Marcus Sorensen | 2-year, $1.4 million | |
| August 7, 2017 | Barclay Goodrow | 1-year, $650,000 | |
| December 28, 2017 | Joachim Blichfeld | 3-year, $2.4 million entry-level contract | |
| February 28, 2018 | Aaron Dell | 2-year, $3.8 million contract extension | |
| March 13, 2018 | Antoine Bibeau | 2-year, $1.35 million contract extension | |
| March 14, 2018 | Maxim Letunov | 2-year, $1.85 million entry-level contract | |
| March 26, 2018 | Dylan Gambrell | 2-year, $2.275 million entry-level contract | |
| April 3, 2018 | Sasha Chmelevski | 3-year, $2.775 million entry-level contract | |
| April 6, 2018 | Noah Gregor | 3-year, $2.55 million entry-level contract | |
| April 20, 2018 | Ivan Chekhovich | 3-year, $2.7 million entry-level contract | |
| April 28, 2018 | Radim Simek | 2-year, $1.35 million contract extension | |
| May 24, 2018 | Evander Kane | 7-year, $49 million contract extension | |

== Draft picks ==
Below are the San Jose Sharks' selections at the 2017 NHL entry draft, held on June 23 and 24, 2017 at the United Center in Chicago.

| Round | # | Player | Pos | Nationality | College/Junior/Club team (League) |
|---|---|---|---|---|---|
| 1 | 19 | Josh Norris | C | United States | U.S. NTDP (USHL) |
| 2 | 49^{1} | Mario Ferraro | D | Canada | Des Moines Buccaneers (USHL) |
| 4 | 102^{2} | Scott Reedy | C | United States | U.S. NTDP (USHL) |
| 6 | 159^{3} | Jacob McGrew | RW | Canada | Spokane Chiefs (WHL) |
| 6 | 185^{4} | Alexander Chmelevski | C | United States | Ottawa 67's (OHL) |
| 7 | 212^{5} | Ivan Chekhovich | LW | Russia | Baie-Comeau Drakkar (QMJHL) |

Notes:

1. The Boston Bruins' second-round pick went to the San Jose Sharks as the result of a trade on June 17, 2017 that sent Mirco Mueller and a fifth-round pick in 2017 to New Jersey in exchange for Nashville's fourth-round pick in 2017 and this pick.
2. The Florida Panthers' fourth-round pick went to the San Jose Sharks as the result of a trade on June 24, 2017, that sent Nashville's fourth-round pick and a sixth-round pick both in 2017 (123rd and 174th overall) to the New York Rangers in exchange for this pick.
3. The Arizona Coyotes' sixth-round pick went to the San Jose Sharks as the result of a trade on June 20, 2016 that sent a fourth-round pick in 2016 and Detroit's third-round pick in 2017 to Arizona in exchange for Maxim Letunov and this pick.
4. The Nashville Predators' sixth-round pick went to the San Jose Sharks as the result of a trade on June 24, 2017, that sent San Jose and Ottawa's seventh-round picks in 2017 (205th and 214th overall) to New Jersey in exchange for this pick.
5. The Chicago Blackhawks' seventh-round pick went to the San Jose Sharks as the result of a trade on March 2, 2015 that sent Andrew Desjardins to Chicago in exchange for Ben Smith and this pick (being conditional at the time of the trade). The condition – San Jose will receive a seventh-round pick in 2017 if Chicago wins the Stanley Cup in 2015 – was converted on June 15, 2015.

== Awards ==
Regular season
| Player | Award | Awarded |
|---|---|---|
| Brent Burns | All-Star | January 10, 2018 |
| Logan Couture | Third Star of the Week | October 23, 2017 |
| Martin Jones | Third Star of the Week | November 6, 2017 |
