= 2017–18 Florida Panthers season =

National Hockey League team season

2017–18 Florida Panthers
- Division: 4th Atlantic
- Conference: 9th Eastern
- 2017–18 record: 44–30–8
- Home record: 27–11–3
- Road record: 17–19–5
- Goals for: 248
- Goals against: 246

Team information
- General manager: Dale Tallon
- Coach: Bob Boughner
- Captain: Derek MacKenzie
- Alternate captains: Aleksander Barkov; Aaron Ekblad; Vincent Trocheck; Keith Yandle
- Arena: BB&T Center
- Average attendance: 13,851
- Minor league affiliate: Springfield Thunderbirds (AHL)

Team leaders
- Goals: Vincent Trocheck (31)
- Assists: Aleksander Barkov (51)
- Points: Aleksander Barkov (78)
- Penalty minutes: Micheal Haley (212)
- Plus/minus: Jared McCann (+11)
- Wins: James Reimer (22)
- Goals against average: Roberto Luongo (2.47)

The 2017–18 Florida Panthers season was the 24th season for the National Hockey League (NHL) franchise that was established on June 14, 1993. The Panthers missed the playoffs for the second straight season for the first time since the 2013–14 season and the 2014–15 season, despite recording 96 points, tied with the 2014–15 Boston Bruins, 2018–19 Montreal Canadiens, and 2024–25 Calgary Flames for the most by a team to miss the playoffs.

== Standings ==
Atlantic Division
| Pos | Team | GP | W | L | OTL | ROW | GF | GA | GD | Pts |
|---|---|---|---|---|---|---|---|---|---|---|
| 1 | z – Tampa Bay Lightning | 82 | 54 | 23 | 5 | 48 | 296 | 236 | +60 | 113 |
| 2 | x – Boston Bruins | 82 | 50 | 20 | 12 | 47 | 270 | 214 | +56 | 112 |
| 3 | x – Toronto Maple Leafs | 82 | 49 | 26 | 7 | 42 | 277 | 232 | +45 | 105 |
| 4 | Florida Panthers | 82 | 44 | 30 | 8 | 41 | 248 | 246 | +2 | 96 |
| 5 | Detroit Red Wings | 82 | 30 | 39 | 13 | 25 | 217 | 255 | −38 | 73 |
| 6 | Montreal Canadiens | 82 | 29 | 40 | 13 | 27 | 209 | 264 | −55 | 71 |
| 7 | Ottawa Senators | 82 | 28 | 43 | 11 | 26 | 221 | 291 | −70 | 67 |
| 8 | Buffalo Sabres | 82 | 25 | 45 | 12 | 24 | 199 | 280 | −81 | 62 |

Source: National Hockey League
x – Clinched playoff spot; z – Clinched conference

Eastern Conference Wild Card
| Pos | Div | Team | GP | W | L | OTL | ROW | GF | GA | GD | Pts |
|---|---|---|---|---|---|---|---|---|---|---|---|
| 1 | ME | x – Columbus Blue Jackets | 82 | 45 | 30 | 7 | 39 | 242 | 230 | +12 | 97 |
| 2 | ME | x – New Jersey Devils | 82 | 44 | 29 | 9 | 39 | 248 | 244 | +4 | 97 |
| 3 | AT | Florida Panthers | 82 | 44 | 30 | 8 | 41 | 248 | 246 | +2 | 96 |
| 4 | ME | Carolina Hurricanes | 82 | 36 | 35 | 11 | 33 | 228 | 256 | −28 | 83 |
| 5 | ME | New York Islanders | 82 | 35 | 37 | 10 | 32 | 264 | 296 | −32 | 80 |
| 6 | ME | New York Rangers | 82 | 34 | 39 | 9 | 31 | 231 | 268 | −37 | 77 |
| 7 | AT | Detroit Red Wings | 82 | 30 | 39 | 13 | 25 | 217 | 255 | −38 | 73 |
| 8 | AT | Montreal Canadiens | 82 | 29 | 40 | 13 | 27 | 209 | 264 | −55 | 71 |
| 9 | AT | Ottawa Senators | 82 | 28 | 43 | 11 | 26 | 221 | 291 | −70 | 67 |
| 10 | AT | Buffalo Sabres | 82 | 25 | 45 | 12 | 24 | 199 | 280 | −81 | 62 |

Source: National Hockey League
x – Clinched playoff spot

== Schedule and results ==
=== Preseason ===
The preseason schedule was released on June 9, 2017.

2017 preseason game log: 4–1–1 (Home: 2–0–0; Road: 2–1–1)
| # | Date | Visitor | Score | Home | OT | Decision | Attendance | Record | Recap |
|---|---|---|---|---|---|---|---|---|---|
| 1 | September 19 | Florida | 5–3 | Nashville | | Sateri | — | 1–0–0 | Recap |
| 2 | September 19 | Florida | 2–3 | Nashville | OT | Montembeault | — | 1–0–1 | Recap |
| 3 | September 24 | Florida | 4–2 | Tampa Bay | | Reimer | 12,911 | 2–0–1 | Recap |
| 4 | September 26 | Tampa Bay | 2–4 | Florida | | Luongo | 8,242 | 3–0–1 | Recap |
| 5 | September 28 | Tampa Bay | 2–5 | Florida | | Reimer | 13,279 | 4–0–1 | Recap |
| 6 | September 29 | Florida | 1–3 | Montreal | | Luongo | 21,288 | 4–1–1 | Recap |

=== Regular season ===
The regular season schedule was published on June 22, 2017.

2017–18 game log

October: 4–6–1 (Home: 3–2–1; Road: 1–4–0)
| # | Date | Visitor | Score | Home | OT | Decision | Attendance | Record | Pts | Recap |
|---|---|---|---|---|---|---|---|---|---|---|
| 1 | October 6 | Florida | 3–5 | Tampa Bay | | Luongo | 19,092 | 0–1–0 | 0 | Recap |
| 2 | October 7 | Tampa Bay | 4–5 | Florida | | Reimer | 16,871 | 1–1–0 | 2 | Recap |
| 3 | October 12 | St. Louis | 2–5 | Florida | | Luongo | 10,846 | 2–1–0 | 4 | Recap |
| 4 | October 14 | Florida | 3–4 | Pittsburgh | | Reimer | 18,582 | 2–2–0 | 4 | Recap |
| 5 | October 17 | Florida | 1–5 | Philadelphia | | Luongo | 19,145 | 2–3–0 | 4 | Recap |
| 6 | October 20 | Pittsburgh | 4–3 | Florida | | Reimer | 15,756 | 2–4–0 | 4 | Recap |
| 7 | October 21 | Florida | 4–1 | Washington | | Reimer | 18,506 | 3–4–0 | 6 | Recap |
| 8 | October 24 | Florida | 1–5 | Montreal | | Reimer | 21,302 | 3–5–0 | 6 | Recap |
| 9 | October 26 | Anaheim | 3–8 | Florida | | Reimer | 10,545 | 4–5–0 | 8 | Recap |
| 10 | October 28 | Detroit | 3–2 | Florida | SO | Reimer | 13,085 | 4–5–1 | 9 | Recap |
| 11 | October 30 | Tampa Bay | 8–5 | Florida | | Niemi | 9,493 | 4–6–1 | 9 | Recap |

November: 6–6–1 (Home: 2–2–1; Road: 4–4–0)
| # | Date | Visitor | Score | Home | OT | Decision | Attendance | Record | Pts | Recap |
|---|---|---|---|---|---|---|---|---|---|---|
| 12 | November 2 | Columbus | 7–3 | Florida | | Reimer | 9,311 | 4–7–1 | 9 | Recap |
| 13 | November 4 | NY Rangers | 5–4 | Florida | OT | Luongo | 15,036 | 4–7–2 | 10 | Recap |
| 14 | November 7 | Florida | 1–3 | Carolina | | Luongo | 8,828 | 4–8–2 | 10 | Recap |
| 15 | November 10 | Florida | 4–1 | Buffalo | | Luongo | 17,812 | 5–8–2 | 12 | Recap |
| 16 | November 11 | Florida | 1–2 | New Jersey | | Reimer | 16,514 | 5–9–2 | 12 | Recap |
| 17 | November 14 | Dallas | 3–4 | Florida | SO | Luongo | 10,928 | 6–9–2 | 14 | Recap |
| 18 | November 16 | Florida | 2–0 | San Jose | | Luongo | 16,411 | 7–9–2 | 16 | Recap |
| 19 | November 18 | Florida | 0–4 | Los Angeles | | Reimer | 18,230 | 7–10–2 | 16 | Recap |
| 20 | November 19 | Florida | 2–3 | Anaheim | | Luongo | 17,174 | 7–11–2 | 16 | Recap |
| 21 | November 22 | Toronto | 1–2 | Florida | SO | Luongo | 15,256 | 8–11–2 | 18 | Recap |
| 22 | November 25 | Chicago | 4–1 | Florida | | Luongo | 14,302 | 8–12–2 | 18 | Recap |
| 23 | November 27 | Florida | 3–2 | New Jersey | | Luongo | 13,184 | 9–12–2 | 20 | Recap |
| 24 | November 28 | Florida | 5–4 | NY Rangers | | Reimer | 17,376 | 10–12–2 | 22 | Recap |

December: 7–4–3 (Home: 5–2–1; Road: 2–2–2)
| # | Date | Visitor | Score | Home | OT | Decision | Attendance | Record | Pts | Recap |
|---|---|---|---|---|---|---|---|---|---|---|
| 25 | December 1 | San Jose | 2–1 | Florida | | Luongo | 12,323 | 10–13–2 | 22 | Recap |
| 26 | December 2 | Florida | 2–3 | Carolina | OT | Reimer | 14,246 | 10–13–3 | 23 | Recap |
| 27 | December 4 | NY Islanders | 5–4 | Florida | SO | Reimer | 11,210 | 10–13–4 | 24 | Recap |
| 28 | December 7 | Winnipeg | 4–6 | Florida | | Reimer | 10,768 | 11–13–4 | 26 | Recap |
| 29 | December 9 | Colorado | 7–3 | Florida | | Reimer | 13,821 | 11–14–4 | 26 | Recap |
| 30 | December 11 | Florida | 2–1 | Detroit | OT | Reimer | 19,515 | 12–14–4 | 28 | Recap |
| 31 | December 12 | Florida | 2–3 | Chicago | OT | Reimer | 21,795 | 12–14–5 | 29 | Recap |
| 32 | December 14 | Florida | 1–2 | Colorado | | Reimer | 13,096 | 12–15–5 | 29 | Recap |
| 33 | December 17 | Florida | 2–5 | Vegas | | Reimer | 17,593 | 12–16–5 | 29 | Recap |
| 34 | December 19 | Florida | 3–2 | Arizona | | Reimer | 10,203 | 13–16–5 | 31 | Recap |
| 35 | December 22 | Minnesota | 2–4 | Florida | | Reimer | 13,259 | 14–16–5 | 33 | Recap |
| 36 | December 23 | Ottawa | 0–1 | Florida | | Reimer | 13,694 | 15–16–5 | 35 | Recap |
| 37 | December 28 | Philadelphia | 2–3 | Florida | | Reimer | 17,083 | 16–16–5 | 37 | Recap |
| 38 | December 30 | Montreal | 0–2 | Florida | | Reimer | 18,013 | 17–16–5 | 39 | Recap |

January: 3–6–1 (Home: 1–2–0; Road: 2–4–1)
| # | Date | Visitor | Score | Home | OT | Decision | Attendance | Record | Pts | Recap |
|---|---|---|---|---|---|---|---|---|---|---|
| 39 | January 2 | Florida | 1–5 | Minnesota | | Reimer | 19,029 | 17–17–5 | 39 | Recap |
| — | January 4 | Florida | — | Boston | Postponed due to the effects of the January 2018 nor'easter, rescheduled to April 8 |
| 40 | January 5 | Florida | 2–4 | Detroit | | Reimer | 19,515 | 17–18–5 | 39 | Recap |
| 41 | January 7 | Florida | 2–3 | Columbus | SO | Reimer | 16,535 | 17–18–6 | 40 | Recap |
| 42 | January 9 | Florida | 7–4 | St. Louis | | Reimer | 18,783 | 18–18–6 | 42 | Recap |
| 43 | January 12 | Calgary | 4–2 | Florida | | Reimer | 14,519 | 18–19–6 | 42 | Recap |
| 44 | January 19 | Vegas | 3–4 | Florida | OT | Reimer | 17,468 | 19–19–6 | 44 | Recap |
| 45 | January 20 | Florida | 3–4 | Nashville | | Sateri | 17,441 | 19–20–6 | 44 | Recap |
| 46 | January 23 | Florida | 1–6 | Dallas | | Sateri | 17,987 | 19–21–6 | 44 | Recap |
| 47 | January 25 | Washington | 4–2 | Florida | | Sateri | 14,033 | 19–22–6 | 44 | Recap |
| 48 | January 30 | Florida | 4–1 | NY Islanders | | Sateri | 10,423 | 20–22–6 | 46 | Recap |

February: 9–3–0 (Home: 5–1–0; Road: 4–2–0)
| # | Date | Visitor | Score | Home | OT | Decision | Attendance | Record | Pts | Recap |
|---|---|---|---|---|---|---|---|---|---|---|
| 49 | February 1 | Florida | 4–2 | Buffalo | | Sateri | 16,707 | 21–22–6 | 48 | Recap |
| 50 | February 3 | Detroit | 2–3 | Florida | | Sateri | 17,987 | 22–22–6 | 50 | Recap |
| 51 | February 6 | Vancouver | 1–3 | Florida | | Sateri | 10,758 | 23–22–6 | 52 | Recap |
| 52 | February 9 | Los Angeles | 3–1 | Florida | | Sateri | 14,099 | 23–23–6 | 52 | Recap |
| 53 | February 12 | Florida | 7–5 | Edmonton | | Reimer | 18,347 | 24–23–6 | 54 | Recap |
| 54 | February 14 | Florida | 4–3 | Vancouver | | Reimer | 17,412 | 25–23–6 | 56 | Recap |
| 55 | February 17 | Florida | 6–3 | Calgary | | Luongo | 19,289 | 26–23–6 | 58 | Recap |
| 56 | February 18 | Florida | 2–7 | Winnipeg | | Reimer | 15,321 | 26–24–6 | 58 | Recap |
| 57 | February 20 | Florida | 0–1 | Toronto | | Luongo | 18,961 | 26–25–6 | 58 | Recap |
| 58 | February 22 | Washington | 2–3 | Florida | | Luongo | 15,312 | 27–25–6 | 60 | Recap |
| 59 | February 24 | Pittsburgh | 5–6 | Florida | | Luongo | 17,581 | 28–25–6 | 62 | Recap |
| 60 | February 27 | Toronto | 2–3 | Florida | OT | Luongo | 14,265 | 29–25–6 | 64 | Recap |

March: 10–5–2 (Home: 7–2–0; Road: 3–3–2)
| # | Date | Visitor | Score | Home | OT | Decision | Attendance | Record | Pts | Recap |
|---|---|---|---|---|---|---|---|---|---|---|
| 61 | March 1 | New Jersey | 2–3 | Florida | | Luongo | 10,846 | 30–25–6 | 66 | Recap |
| 62 | March 2 | Buffalo | 1–4 | Florida | | Reimer | 12,759 | 31–25–6 | 68 | Recap |
| 63 | March 4 | Philadelphia | 1–4 | Florida | | Luongo | 14,428 | 32–25–6 | 70 | Recap |
| 64 | March 6 | Florida | 4–5 | Tampa Bay | OT | Luongo | 19,092 | 32–25–7 | 71 | Recap |
| 65 | March 8 | Montreal | 0–5 | Florida | | Luongo | 14,901 | 33–25–7 | 73 | Recap |
| 66 | March 10 | NY Rangers | 3–4 | Florida | SO | Luongo | 16,712 | 34–25–7 | 75 | Recap |
| 67 | March 12 | Ottawa | 5–3 | Florida | | Luongo | 11,585 | 34–26–7 | 75 | Recap |
| 68 | March 15 | Boston | 0–3 | Florida | | Reimer | 16,067 | 35–26–7 | 77 | Recap |
| 69 | March 17 | Edmonton | 4–2 | Florida | | Luongo | 14,192 | 35–27–7 | 77 | Recap |
| 70 | March 19 | Florida | 2–0 | Montreal | | Luongo | 21,302 | 36–27–7 | 79 | Recap |
| 71 | March 20 | Florida | 7–2 | Ottawa | | Reimer | 14,434 | 37–27–7 | 81 | Recap |
| 72 | March 22 | Florida | 0–4 | Columbus | | Luongo | 16,919 | 37–28–7 | 81 | Recap |
| 73 | March 24 | Arizona | 2–4 | Florida | | Reimer | 14,905 | 38–28–7 | 83 | Recap |
| 74 | March 26 | Florida | 3–0 | NY Islanders | | Reimer | 10,951 | 39–28–7 | 85 | Recap |
| 75 | March 28 | Florida | 3–4 | Toronto | | Luongo | 18,893 | 39–29–7 | 85 | Recap |
| 76 | March 29 | Florida | 2–3 | Ottawa | OT | Reimer | 15,095 | 39–29–8 | 86 | Recap |
| 77 | March 31 | Florida | 1–5 | Boston | | Reimer | 17,565 | 39–30–8 | 86 | Recap |

April: 5–0–0 (Home: 4–0–0; Road: 1–0–0)
| # | Date | Visitor | Score | Home | OT | Decision | Attendance | Record | Pts | Recap |
|---|---|---|---|---|---|---|---|---|---|---|
| 78 | April 2 | Carolina | 2–3 | Florida | | Luongo | 10,619 | 40–30–8 | 88 | Recap |
| 79 | April 3 | Nashville | 1–2 | Florida | | Luongo | 12,147 | 41–30–8 | 90 | Recap |
| 80 | April 5 | Boston | 2–3 | Florida | | Luongo | 14,860 | 42–30–8 | 92 | Recap |
| 81 | April 7 | Buffalo | 3–4 | Florida | | Reimer | 16,254 | 43–30–8 | 94 | Recap |
| 82 | April 8 | Florida | 4–2 | Boston | | Reimer | 17,565 | 44–30–8 | 96 | Recap |

Legend: Win (2 points) Loss (0 points) Overtime/shootout loss (1 point)

== Player statistics ==
As of April 9, 2018

=== Skaters ===
Regular season
| Player | GP | G | A | Pts | +/− | PIM |
|---|---|---|---|---|---|---|
| Aleksander Barkov | 79 | 27 | 51 | 78 | 9 | 14 |
| Vincent Trocheck | 82 | 31 | 44 | 75 | −9 | 54 |
| Jonathan Huberdeau | 82 | 27 | 42 | 69 | −2 | 32 |
| Evgenii Dadonov | 74 | 28 | 37 | 65 | 10 | 8 |
| Keith Yandle | 82 | 8 | 48 | 56 | 7 | 35 |
| Nick Bjugstad | 82 | 19 | 30 | 49 | 5 | 41 |
| Aaron Ekblad | 82 | 16 | 22 | 38 | 9 | 71 |
| Jamie McGinn | 76 | 13 | 16 | 29 | −5 | 33 |
| Jared McCann | 68 | 9 | 19 | 28 | 11 | 30 |
| Michael Matheson | 81 | 10 | 17 | 27 | −1 | 61 |
| Colton Sceviour | 76 | 11 | 13 | 24 | 6 | 24 |
| Denis Malgin | 51 | 11 | 11 | 22 | 4 | 6 |
| Mark Pysyk | 82 | 3 | 13 | 16 | −8 | 20 |
| Radim Vrbata | 42 | 5 | 9 | 14 | −7 | 16 |
| Derek MacKenzie | 75 | 3 | 11 | 14 | −9 | 31 |
| Alex Petrovic | 67 | 2 | 11 | 13 | −2 | 98 |
| Connor Brickley | 44 | 4 | 8 | 12 | −6 | 19 |
| Micheal Haley | 75 | 3 | 6 | 9 | −13 | 212 |
| Frank Vatrano^{†} | 16 | 5 | 3 | 8 | 6 | 12 |
| MacKenzie Weegar | 60 | 2 | 6 | 8 | 5 | 32 |
| Maxim Mamin | 26 | 3 | 1 | 4 | 2 | 7 |
| Ian McCoshen | 38 | 3 | 1 | 4 | −10 | 25 |
| Henrik Borgstrom | 4 | 1 | 0 | 1 | −1 | 0 |
| Owen Tippett | 7 | 1 | 0 | 1 | −6 | 0 |
| Henrik Haapala | 5 | 0 | 1 | 1 | 0 | 0 |
| Dryden Hunt | 11 | 0 | 1 | 1 | −5 | 2 |
| Chase Balisy | 8 | 0 | 0 | 0 | −2 | 0 |
| Curtis Valk | 1 | 0 | 0 | 0 | 0 | 0 |

=== Goaltenders ===
Regular season
| Player | GP | GS | TOI | W | L | OT | GA | GAA | SA | SV% | SO | G | A | PIM |
|---|---|---|---|---|---|---|---|---|---|---|---|---|---|---|
| James Reimer | 44 | 42 | 2,411:25 | 22 | 14 | 6 | 120 | 2.99 | 1373 | .913 | 4 | 0 | 1 | 4 |
| Roberto Luongo | 35 | 33 | 1,965:58 | 18 | 11 | 2 | 81 | 2.47 | 1143 | .929 | 3 | 0 | 2 | 0 |
| Harri Sateri | 9 | 7 | 492:36 | 4 | 4 | 0 | 24 | 2.92 | 271 | .911 | 0 | 0 | 0 | 0 |
| Antti Niemi^{†‡} | 2 | 0 | 58:42 | 0 | 1 | 0 | 5 | 5.11 | 39 | .872 | 0 | 0 | 0 | 0 |

^{†}Denotes player spent time with another team before joining the Panthers. Statistics reflect time with the Panthers only.
^{‡}Denotes player was traded mid-season. Statistics reflect time with the Panthers only.
Bold denotes season record.

== Transactions ==
The Panthers have been involved in the following transactions during the 2017–18 season.

=== Trades ===
| Date | Details | | Ref |
|---|---|---|---|
| June 21, 2017 | To Vegas Golden Knights Reilly Smith | To Florida Panthers 4th-round pick in 2018 |
| November 10, 2017 | To Dallas Stars Reece Scarlett | To Florida Panthers Ludvig Bystrom |
| December 19, 2017 | To Edmonton Oilers Future considerations | To Florida Panthers Gregory Chase |
| February 22, 2018 | To Boston Bruins 3rd-round pick in 2018 | To Florida Panthers Frank Vatrano |
| June 19, 2018 | To San Jose Sharks 2nd-round pick in 2019; 4th-round pick in 2018; 5th-round pick in 2018 | To Florida Panthers Mike Hoffman; 7th-round pick in 2018 |

=== Free agents acquired ===
| Date | Player | Former team | Contract terms (in U.S. dollars) | Ref |
|---|---|---|---|---|
| July 1, 2017 | Connor Brickley | Vegas Golden Knights | 1-year, $750,000 | |
| July 1, 2017 | Evgenii Dadonov | SKA St. Petersburg | 3-year, $12 million | |
| July 1, 2017 | Micheal Haley | San Jose Sharks | 2-year, $1.65 million | |
| July 1, 2017 | Harri Sateri | Vityaz Podolsk | 1-year, $750,000 | |
| July 1, 2017 | Curtis Valk | Utica Comets | 1-year, $682,500 entry-level contract | |
| July 1, 2017 | Radim Vrbata | Arizona Coyotes | 1-year, $2.5 million | |
| July 2, 2017 | Alexandre Grenier | Vancouver Canucks | 1-year, $725,000 | |
| September 22, 2017 | Edward Wittchow | Springfield Thunderbirds | 1-year, $670,000 | |
| November 20, 2017 | Anthony Greco | Springfield Thunderbirds | 1-year, $660,000 | |
| March 9, 2017 | Patrick Bajkov | Everett Silvertips | 3-year, $2.775 million entry-level contract | |
| June 1, 2017 | Bogdan Kiselevich | CSKA Moscow | 1-year, $650,000 | |

=== Free agents lost ===
| Date | Player | New team | Contract terms (in U.S. dollars) | Ref |
|---|---|---|---|---|
| April 27, 2017 | Tim Bozon | EHC Kloten | 1-year | |
| July 1, 2017 | Adam Wilcox | Buffalo Sabres | 1-year | |
| July 1, 2017 | Brent Regner | Dallas Stars | 1-year | |
| July 1, 2017 | Kyle Rau | Minnesota Wild | 1-year, $700,000 | |
| July 1, 2017 | Paul Thompson | Vegas Golden Knights | 1-year, $650,000 | |
| July 1, 2017 | Michael Sgarbossa | Winnipeg Jets | 1-year, $650,000 | |
| July 5, 2017 | Brody Sutter | Manitoba Moose | 1-year | |
| July 7, 2017 | Jussi Jokinen | Edmonton Oilers | 1-year, $1.1 million | |
| August 8, 2017 | Colin Stevens | Wheeling Nailers | 1-year | |
| August 21, 2017 | Sam Brittain | San Antonio Rampage | Unknown | |
| September 1, 2017 | Thomas Vanek | Vancouver Canucks | 1-year, $900,000 | |
| August 29, 2017 | Graham Black | University of Calgary | Unknown | |
| October 4, 2017 | Jaromir Jagr | Calgary Flames | 1-year, $1 million | |
| October 18, 2017 | Jakub Kindl | HC Plzeň | Unknown | |

=== Claimed via waivers ===
| Player | Previous team | Date | Ref |
|---|---|---|---|
| Antti Niemi | Pittsburgh Penguins | October 24, 2017 | |

=== Lost via waivers ===
| Player | New team | Date | Ref |
|---|---|---|---|
| Antti Niemi | Montreal Canadiens | November 14, 2017 | |

=== Lost via retirement ===
| Date | Player | Ref |

=== Player signings ===
| Date | Player | Contract terms (in U.S. dollars) | Ref |
|---|---|---|---|
| June 30, 2017 | Chase Balisy | 1-year, $650,000 | |
| June 30, 2017 | Reece Scarlett | 1-year, $675,000 | |
| June 30, 2017 | Alex Petrovic | 1-year, $1.85 million | |
| July 2, 2017 | Sebastian Repo | 3-year, $2.775 million entry-level contract | |
| July 6, 2017 | Mark Pysyk | 3-year, $8.2 million | |
| July 19, 2017 | Owen Tippett | 3-year, $4.975 million entry-level contract | |
| August 3, 2017 | MacKenzie Weegar | 1-year, $675,000 | |
| October 7, 2017 | Mike Matheson | 8-year, $39 million contract extension | |
| November 16, 2017 | Jonathan Ang | 3-year, $2.775 million entry-level contract | |
| February 12, 2018 | Colton Sceviour | 3-year, $3.6 million contract extension | |
| March 4, 2018 | Riley Stillman | 3-year, $2.7 million entry-level contract | |
| March 27, 2018 | Henrik Borgstrom | 3-year, $4.475 million entry-level contract | |
| May 31, 2018 | Josh Brown | 2-year, $1.35 million contract extension | |
| May 31, 2018 | Ludvig Byström | 1-year, $650,000 contract extension | |

== Draft picks ==
Below are the Florida Panthers' selections at the 2017 NHL entry draft, which was held on June 23 and 24, 2017 at the United Center in Chicago.

| Round | # | Player | Pos | Nationality | College/Junior/Club team (League) |
|---|---|---|---|---|---|
| 1 | 10 | Owen Tippett | RW | Canada | Mississauga Steelheads (OHL) |
| 2 | 40 | Aleksi Heponiemi | C | Finland | Swift Current Broncos (WHL) |
| 3 | 66^{1} | Max Gildon | D | United States | U.S. NTDP (USHL) |
| 5 | 133 | Tyler Inamoto | D | United States | U.S. NTDP (USHL) |
| 6 | 184^{2} | Sebastian Repo | C | Finland | Tappara (Liiga) |

Draft notes:

1. The Arizona Coyotes' third-round pick went to the Florida Panthers as the result of a trade on August 25, 2016, that sent Dave Bolland and Lawson Crouse to Arizona in exchange for a conditional second-round pick in 2018 and this pick (being conditional at the time of the trade). The condition – Florida will receive the better of Arizona or Detroit's third-round picks in 2017 – was converted on March 29, 2017, when Detroit clinched a better regular season record than Arizona for the 2016–17 NHL season.
2. The Anaheim Ducks' sixth-round pick went to the Florida Panthers as the result of a trade on December 4, 2014, that sent Colby Robak to Anaheim in exchange for Jesse Blacker and this pick (being conditional at the time of the trade). The condition — Florida will receive a sixth-round pick in 2017 dependent on how many games Robak played for Anaheim during the 2014–15 NHL season — the date of conversion is unknown.
