= 2017–18 Edmonton Oilers season =

NHL team season

2017–18 Edmonton Oilers
- Division: 6th Pacific
- Conference: 12th Western
- 2017–18 record: 36–40–6
- Home record: 19–18–4
- Road record: 17–22–2
- Goals for: 234
- Goals against: 263

Team information
- General manager: Peter Chiarelli
- Coach: Todd McLellan
- Captain: Connor McDavid
- Alternate captains: Adam Larsson; Milan Lucic; Ryan Nugent-Hopkins
- Arena: Rogers Place
- Average attendance: 18,347
- Minor league affiliates: Bakersfield Condors (AHL); Wichita Thunder (ECHL)

Team leaders
- Goals: Connor McDavid (41)
- Assists: Connor McDavid (67)
- Points: Connor McDavid (108)
- Penalty minutes: Zack Kassian (92)
- Plus/minus: Connor McDavid (+20)
- Wins: Cam Talbot (31)
- Goals against average: Al Montoya (2.94)

The 2017–18 Edmonton Oilers season was the 39th season for the National Hockey League (NHL) franchise that was established on June 22, 1979, and 46th season including their play in the World Hockey Association (WHA). The Oilers missed the playoffs for the first time since the 2015–16 season, despite qualifying for the playoffs the previous year and being given the second best preseason Stanley Cup odds.

== Standings ==
Pacific Division
Pos	Team	GP	W	L	OTL	ROW	GF	GA	GD	Pts
1	y – Vegas Golden Knights	82	51	24	7	47	272	228	+44	109
2	x – Anaheim Ducks	82	44	25	13	40	235	216	+19	101
3	x – San Jose Sharks	82	45	27	10	40	252	229	+23	100
4	x – Los Angeles Kings	82	45	29	8	43	239	203	+36	98
5	Calgary Flames	82	37	35	10	35	218	248	−30	84
6	Edmonton Oilers	82	36	40	6	31	234	263	−29	78
7	Vancouver Canucks	82	31	40	11	31	218	264	−46	73
8	Arizona Coyotes	82	29	41	12	27	208	256	−48	70

Source: National Hockey League
x – Clinched playoff spot; y – Clinched division

Western Conference Wild Card
Pos	Div	Team	GP	W	L	OTL	ROW	GF	GA	GD	Pts
1	PA	x – Los Angeles Kings	82	45	29	8	43	239	203	+36	98
2	CE	x – Colorado Avalanche	82	43	30	9	41	257	237	+20	95
3	CE	St. Louis Blues	82	44	32	6	41	226	222	+4	94
4	CE	Dallas Stars	82	42	32	8	38	235	225	+10	92
5	PA	Calgary Flames	82	37	35	10	35	218	248	−30	84
6	PA	Edmonton Oilers	82	36	40	6	31	234	263	−29	78
7	CE	Chicago Blackhawks	82	33	39	10	32	229	256	−27	76
8	PA	Vancouver Canucks	82	31	40	11	31	218	264	−46	73
9	PA	Arizona Coyotes	82	29	41	12	27	208	256	−48	70

Source: National Hockey League
x – Clinched playoff spot

== Schedule and results ==
=== Pre-season ===
The Oilers released their pre-season schedule on June 8, 2017. The Oilers' rookies and prospects participated in the annual Young Stars Classic tournament before the start of pre-season games.

Pre-season game log

Young Stars Classic: 3–0–0
#	Date	Visitor	Score	Home	OT	Decision	Attendance	Record	Recap
1^{[a]}	September 8	Edmonton	4–2	Calgary		Wells	–	1–0–0	Recap
2^{[a]}	September 9	Winnipeg	0–3	Edmonton		Skinner	–	2–0–0	Recap
3^{[a]}	September 11	Edmonton	5–4	Vancouver	OT	Starrett	–	3–0–0	Recap
^{[a]} Young Stars Classic tournament at South Okanagan Events Centre in Penticton, British Columbia

2017 pre-season game log: 6–2–0 (Home: 3–1–0; Road: 3–1–0)
#	Date	Visitor	Score	Home	OT	Decision	Attendance	Record	Recap
1^{[A]}	September 18	Calgary	2–5	Edmonton		Talbot	18,347	1–0–0	Recap
2^{[A]}	September 18	Edmonton	5–4	Calgary		Ellis	–	2–0–0	Recap
3	September 20	Edmonton	4–1	Winnipeg		Brossoit	15,294	3–0–0	Recap
4	September 22	Vancouver	3–5	Edmonton		Brossoit	18,347	4–0–0	Recap
5	September 23	Winnipeg	2–6	Edmonton		Talbot	18,347	5–0–0	Recap
6	September 25	Carolina	6–2	Edmonton		Talbot	18,347	5–1–0	Recap
7^{[a]}	September 27	Edmonton	4–0	Carolina		Brossoit	–	6–1–0	Recap
8	September 30	Edmonton	2–3	Vancouver		Talbot	16,637	6–2–0	Recap
Notes:^{A} Indicates split-squad.^{a} Game was played at SaskTel Centre in Saskatoon, Saskatchewan.

=== Regular season ===
The regular season schedule was published on June 22, 2017.

2017–18 game log

October: 3–6–1 (Home: 2–4–0; Road: 1–2–1)
#	Date	Visitor	Score	Home	OT	Decision	Attendance	Record	Pts	Recap
1	October 4	Calgary	0–3	Edmonton		Talbot	18,347	1–0–0	2	Recap
2	October 7	Edmonton	2–3	Vancouver		Talbot	18,865	1–1–0	2	Recap
3	October 9	Winnipeg	5–2	Edmonton		Talbot	18,347	1–2–0	2	Recap
4	October 14	Ottawa	6–1	Edmonton		Talbot	18,347	1–3–0	2	Recap
5	October 17	Carolina	5–3	Edmonton		Brossoit	18,347	1–4–0	2	Recap
6	October 19	Edmonton	2–1	Chicago	OT	Talbot	21,444	2–4–0	4	Recap
7	October 21	Edmonton	1–2	Philadelphia		Talbot	19,510	2–5–0	4	Recap
8	October 24	Edmonton	1–2	Pittsburgh	OT	Talbot	18,625	2–5–1	5	Recap
9	October 26	Dallas	4–5	Edmonton		Talbot	18,347	3–5–1	7	Recap
10	October 28	Washington	5–2	Edmonton		Talbot	18,347	3–6–1	7	Recap

November: 7–8–1 (Home: 3–4–0; Road: 4–4–1)
#	Date	Visitor	Score	Home	OT	Decision	Attendance	Record	Pts	Recap
11	November 1	Pittsburgh	3–2	Edmonton		Talbot	18,347	3–7–1	7	Recap
12	November 3	New Jersey	3–6	Edmonton		Talbot	18,347	4–7–1	9	Recap
13	November 5	Detroit	4–0	Edmonton		Talbot	18,347	4–8–1	9	Recap
14	November 7	Edmonton	2–1	NY Islanders	OT	Talbot	12,281	5–8–1	11	Recap
15	November 9	Edmonton	3–2	New Jersey	OT	Talbot	16,514	6–8–1	13	Recap
16	November 11	Edmonton	2–4	NY Rangers		Talbot	18,006	6–9–1	13	Recap
17	November 12	Edmonton	1–2	Washington	SO	Brossoit	18,506	6–9–2	14	Recap
18	November 14	Vegas	2–8	Edmonton		Talbot	18,347	7–9–2	16	Recap
19	November 16	St. Louis	4–1	Edmonton		Talbot	18,347	7–10–2	16	Recap
20	November 18	Edmonton	3–6	Dallas		Talbot	18,312	7–11–2	16	Recap
21	November 21	Edmonton	3–8	St. Louis		Brossoit	18,819	7–12–2	16	Recap
22	November 22	Edmonton	6–2	Detroit		Talbot	19,515	8–12–2	18	Recap
23	November 24	Edmonton	1–3	Buffalo		Brossoit	19,070	8–13–2	18	Recap
24	November 26	Edmonton	4–2	Boston		Talbot	17,565	9–13–2	20	Recap
25	November 28	Arizona	2–3	Edmonton	OT	Talbot	18,347	10–13–2	22	Recap
26	November 30	Toronto	6–4	Edmonton		Brossoit	18,347	10–14–2	22	Recap

December: 7–5–1 (Home: 3–3–1; Road: 4–2–0)
#	Date	Visitor	Score	Home	OT	Decision	Attendance	Record	Pts	Recap
27	December 2	Edmonton	7–5	Calgary		Brossoit	19,289	11–14–2	24	Recap
28	December 6	Philadelphia	4–2	Edmonton		Brossoit	18,347	11–15–2	24	Recap
29	December 9	Edmonton	6–2	Montreal		Brossoit	21,302	12–15–2	26	Recap
30	December 10	Edmonton	0–1	Toronto		Brossoit	19,486	12–16–2	26	Recap
31	December 12	Edmonton	7–2	Columbus		Brossoit	14,767	13–16–2	28	Recap
32	December 14	Nashville	4–0	Edmonton		Brossoit	18,347	13–17–2	28	Recap
33	December 16	Edmonton	3–2	Minnesota		Talbot	19,034	14–17–2	30	Recap
34	December 18	San Jose	3–5	Edmonton		Talbot	18,347	15–17–2	32	Recap
35	December 21	St. Louis	2–3	Edmonton		Talbot	18,347	16–17–2	34	Recap
36	December 23	Montreal	1–4	Edmonton		Talbot	18,347	17–17–2	36	Recap
37	December 27	Edmonton	3–4	Winnipeg		Talbot	15,321	17–18–2	36	Recap
38	December 29	Chicago	4–3	Edmonton	OT	Talbot	18,347	17–18–3	37	Recap
39	December 31	Winnipeg	5–0	Edmonton		Talbot	18,347	17–19–3	37	Recap

January: 5–5–0 (Home: 3–2–0; Road: 2–3–0)
#	Date	Visitor	Score	Home	OT	Decision	Attendance	Record	Pts	Recap
40	January 2	Los Angeles	5–0	Edmonton		Talbot	18,347	17–20–3	37	Recap
41	January 4	Anaheim	1–2	Edmonton	SO	Talbot	18,347	18–20–3	39	Recap
42	January 6	Edmonton	1–5	Dallas		Talbot	18,532	18–21–3	39	Recap
43	January 7	Edmonton	1–4	Chicago		Talbot	21,901	18–22–3	39	Recap
44	January 9	Edmonton	1–2	Nashville		Talbot	17,188	18–23–3	39	Recap
45	January 12	Edmonton	4–2	Arizona		Montoya	14,077	19–23–3	41	Recap
46	January 13	Edmonton	3–2	Vegas	OT	Talbot	18,351	20–23–3	43	Recap
47	January 20	Vancouver	2–5	Edmonton		Talbot	18,347	21–23–3	45	Recap
48	January 23	Buffalo	5–0	Edmonton		Talbot	18,347	21–24–3	45	Recap
49	January 25	Calgary	3–4	Edmonton	SO	Talbot	18,347	22–24–3	47	Recap

February: 5–8–1 (Home: 2–2–1; Road: 3–6–0)
#	Date	Visitor	Score	Home	OT	Decision	Attendance	Record	Pts	Recap
50	February 1	Colorado	4–3	Edmonton	OT	Montoya	18,347	22–24–4	48	Recap
51	February 5	Tampa Bay	2–6	Edmonton		Talbot	18,347	23–24–4	50	Recap
52	February 7	Edmonton	2–5	Los Angeles		Talbot	18,230	23–25–4	50	Recap
53	February 9	Edmonton	2–3	Anaheim		Talbot	17,174	23–26–4	50	Recap
54	February 10	Edmonton	4–6	San Jose		Montoya	17,562	23–27–4	50	Recap
55	February 12	Florida	7–5	Edmonton		Talbot	18,347	23–28–4	50	Recap
56	February 15	Edmonton	1–4	Vegas		Talbot	18,030	23–29–4	50	Recap
57	February 17	Edmonton	0–1	Arizona		Talbot	16,304	23–30–4	50	Recap
58	February 18	Edmonton	4–2	Colorado		Talbot	18,076	24–30–4	52	Recap
59	February 20	Boston	3–2	Edmonton		Talbot	18,347	24–31–4	52	Recap
60	February 22	Colorado	2–3	Edmonton	OT	Talbot	18,347	25–31–4	54	Recap
61	February 24	Edmonton	4–3	Los Angeles		Talbot	18,230	26–31–4	56	Recap
62	February 25	Edmonton	6–5	Anaheim	SO	Montoya	17,174	27–31–4	58	Recap
63	February 27	Edmonton	2–5	San Jose		Talbot	17,327	27–32–4	58	Recap

March: 7–7–2 (Home: 4–3–2; Road: 3–4–0)
#	Date	Visitor	Score	Home	OT	Decision	Attendance	Record	Pts	Recap
64	March 1	Nashville	4–2	Edmonton		Talbot	18,347	27–33–4	58	Recap
65	March 3	NY Rangers	3–2	Edmonton		Talbot	18,347	27–34–4	58	Recap
66	March 5	Arizona	3–4	Edmonton	OT	Talbot	18,347	28–34–4	60	Recap
67	March 8	NY Islanders	1–2	Edmonton	SO	Talbot	18,347	29–34–4	62	Recap
68	March 10	Minnesota	1–4	Edmonton		Talbot	18,347	30–34–4	64	Recap
69	March 13	Edmonton	0–1	Calgary		Talbot	19,289	30–35–4	64	Recap
70	March 14	San Jose	4–3	Edmonton	OT	Montoya	18,347	30–35–5	65	Recap
71	March 17	Edmonton	4–2	Florida		Talbot	14,192	31–35–5	67	Recap
72	March 18	Edmonton	1–3	Tampa Bay		Montoya	19,092	31–36–5	67	Recap
73	March 20	Edmonton	7–3	Carolina		Talbot	10,554	32–36–5	69	Recap
74	March 22	Edmonton	6–2	Ottawa		Talbot	16,538	33–36–5	71	Recap
75	March 24	Los Angeles	2–3	Edmonton		Talbot	18,347	34–36–5	73	Recap
76	March 25	Anaheim	5–4	Edmonton	OT	Talbot	18,347	34–36–6	74	Recap
77	March 27	Columbus	7–3	Edmonton		Talbot	18,347	34–37–6	74	Recap
78	March 29	Edmonton	1–2	Vancouver		Talbot	17,883	34–38–6	74	Recap
79	March 31	Edmonton	2–3	Calgary		Talbot	19,289	34–39–6	74	Recap

April: 2–1–0 (Home: 2–0–0; Road: 0–1–0)
#	Date	Visitor	Score	Home	OT	Decision	Attendance	Record	Pts	Recap
80	April 2	Edmonton	0–3	Minnesota		Talbot	19,189	34–40–6	74	Recap
81	April 5	Vegas	3–4	Edmonton		Talbot	18,347	35–40–6	76	Recap
82	April 7	Vancouver	2–3	Edmonton	SO	Talbot	18,347	36–40–6	78	Recap

Legend: Win (2 points) Loss (0 points) Overtime/shootout loss (1 point)

== Player statistics ==
Final

=== Skaters ===
Regular season
Player	GP	G	A	Pts	+/−	PIM
Connor McDavid	82	41	67	108	20	26
Leon Draisaitl	78	25	45	70	−7	30
Ryan Nugent-Hopkins	62	24	24	48	10	20
Ryan Strome	82	13	21	34	−4	33
Milan Lucic	82	10	24	34	−12	80
Patrick Maroon^{‡}	57	14	16	30	5	60
Darnell Nurse	82	6	20	26	15	67
Michael Cammalleri^{†}	51	4	18	22	−4	14
Jujhar Khaira	69	11	10	21	−7	47
Matt Benning	73	6	15	21	5	49
Oscar Klefbom	66	5	16	21	−12	18
Kris Russell	78	4	17	21	−7	8
Drake Caggiula	67	13	7	20	−13	37
Jesse Puljujarvi	65	12	8	20	−1	14
Mark Letestu^{‡}	60	8	11	19	−17	10
Zack Kassian	74	7	12	19	−8	92
Adam Larsson	63	4	9	13	10	34
Anton Slepyshev	50	6	6	12	−4	8
Ty Rattie	14	5	4	9	1	2
Yohann Auvitu	33	3	6	9	4	8
Pontus Aberg^{†}	16	2	6	8	1	2
Andrej Sekera	36	0	8	8	−15	6
Brandon Davidson^{†‡}	23	3	1	4	−2	10
Ethan Bear	18	1	3	4	−11	10
Iiro Pakarinen	40	2	1	3	1	6
Kailer Yamamoto	9	0	3	3	−2	2
Eric Gryba	21	0	2	2	4	31
Jussi Jokinen^{‡}	14	0	1	1	−3	2
Keegan Lowe	2	0	0	0	−1	0
Brad Malone	7	0	0	0	0	6
Nathan Walker^{†‡}	2	0	0	0	−1	2

=== Goaltenders ===
Regular season
Player	GP	GS	TOI	W	L	OT	GA	GAA	SA	SV	SV%	SO	G	A	PIM
Cam Talbot	67	67	3,730:06	31	31	3	188	2.98	1848	2036	.908	1	0	1	8
Laurent Brossoit	14	10	740:14	3	7	1	40	3.45	303	343	.883	0	0	1	0
Al Montoya	9	5	469:13	2	2	2	23	3.24	221	244	.906	0	0	1	0

^{†}Denotes player spent time with another team before joining the Oilers. Statistics reflect time with the Oilers only.
^{‡}Denotes player was traded mid-season. Statistics reflect time with the Oilers only.
Bold/italics denotes franchise record.

== Milestones ==
Regular season
Player	Milestone	Reached
Connor McDavid	1st NHL natural hat-trick	October 4, 2017
Kailer Yamamoto	1st NHL game	October 4, 2017
Kailer Yamamoto	1st NHL assist 1st NHL point	October 14, 2017
Ryan Nugent-Hopkins	400th NHL game	October 17, 2017
Iiro Pakarinen	100th NHL game	October 21, 2017
Darnell Nurse	100th NHL PIM	October 24, 2017
Jussi Jokinen	900th NHL game	October 28, 2017
Oscar Klefbom	200th NHL game	November 1, 2017
Ryan Nugent-Hopkins	100th NHL goal	November 1, 2017
Cam Talbot	100th NHL win	November 3, 2017
Leon Draisaitl	200th NHL game	November 5, 2017
Zack Kassian	100th NHL point	November 9, 2017
Cam Talbot	200th NHL game	November 9, 2017
Patrick Maroon	400th NHL PIM	November 18, 2017
Mark Letestu	500th NHL game	November 22, 2017
Kris Russell	200th NHL point	November 30, 2017
Leon Draisaitl	100th NHL assist	December 9, 2017
Mark Letestu	200th NHL point	December 9, 2017
Laurent Brossoit	1st NHL assist	December 12, 2017
Matt Benning	100th NHL game	January 6, 2018
Ryan Strome	300th NHL game	January 6, 2018
Connor McDavid	200th NHL point	January 13, 2018
Zack Kassian	600th NHL PIM	January 25, 2018
Connor McDavid	1st four-goal NHL game	February 5, 2018
Drake Caggiula	100th NHL game	February 7, 2018
Kris Russell	700th NHL game	February 20, 2018
Adam Larsson	400th NHL game	February 27, 2018
Ethan Bear	1st NHL game	March 1, 2018
Ryan Strome	100th NHL assist	March 5, 2018
Ethan Bear	1st NHL assist 1st NHL point	March 8, 2018
Ryan Nugent-Hopkins	300th NHL point	March 10, 2018
Michael Cammalleri	900th NHL game	March 13, 2018
Milan Lucic	800th NHL game	March 17, 2018
Leon Draisaitl	200th NHL point	March 20, 2018
Connor McDavid	200th NHL game	March 20, 2018
Adam Larsson	100th NHL point	March 24, 2018
Ethan Bear	1st NHL goal	March 25, 2018
Anton Slepyshev	100th NHL game	April 2, 2018

== Transactions ==
The Oilers have been involved in the following transactions during the 2017–18 season.

=== Trades ===
Date	Details		Ref
June 22, 2017	To New York Islanders Jordan Eberle	To Edmonton Oilers Ryan Strome
June 24, 2017	To Arizona Coyotes 3rd-round pick in 2017; 5th-round pick in 2017	To Edmonton Oilers 3rd-round-pick in 2017
November 14, 2017	To Los Angeles Kings Jussi Jokinen	To Edmonton Oilers Michael Cammalleri
December 19, 2017	To Florida Panthers Gregory Chase	To Edmonton Oilers Future considerations
January 4, 2018	To Montreal Canadiens 4th-round pick in 2018	To Edmonton Oilers Al Montoya
January 31, 2018	To Tampa Bay Lightning Edward Pasquale	To Edmonton Oilers Future considerations
February 24, 2018	To New York Islanders Brandon Davidson	To Edmonton Oilers 3rd-round pick in 2019
February 25, 2018	To Nashville Predators Mark Letestu	To Edmonton Oilers Pontus Aberg
February 26, 2018	To New Jersey Devils Patrick Maroon	To Edmonton Oilers J. D. Dudek; 3rd-round pick in 2019
March 21, 2018	To Philadelphia Flyers NJD's 3rd-round pick in 2019	To Edmonton Oilers Rights to Cooper Marody
June 8, 2018	To Toronto Maple Leafs conditional 7th-round pick in 2020	To Edmonton Oilers Rights to Nolan Vesey

=== Free agents acquired ===
Date	Player	Former team	Contract terms (in U.S. dollars)	Ref
July 1, 2017	Mitch Callahan	Detroit Red Wings	2-year, $1.4 million	
July 1, 2017	Edward Pasquale	Detroit Red Wings	1-year, $700,000	
July 1, 2017	Grayson Downing	Arizona Coyotes	1-year, $650,000	
July 1, 2017	Brian Ferlin	Boston Bruins	1-year, $700,000	
July 1, 2017	Keegan Lowe	Montreal Canadiens	1-year, $650,000	
July 1, 2017	Ty Rattie	St. Louis Blues	1-year, $700,000	
July 1, 2017	Ryan Stanton	Columbus Blue Jackets	2-year, $1.4 million	
July 3, 2017	Brad Malone	St. Louis Blues	2-year, $1.3 million	
July 7, 2017	Jussi Jokinen	Florida Panthers	1-year, $1.1 million	
July 10, 2017	Yohann Auvitu	New Jersey Devils	1-year, $700,000	
December 28, 2017	Cameron Hebig	Saskatoon Blades (WHL)	3-year, $2.775 million entry-level contract	
March 5, 2018	Colin Larkin	UMass Boston Beacons (NCAA III)	1-year, $690,000 entry-level contract	
May 1, 2018	Mikko Koskinen	SKA Saint Petersburg (KHL)	1-year, $2.5 million	
May 18, 2018	Joel Persson	Växjö Lakers (SHL)	1-year, $1.775 million entry-level contract	

=== Free agents lost ===
Date	Player	New team	Contract terms (in U.S. dollars)	Ref
June 12, 2017	Eetu Laurikainen	JYP (Liiga)	2-year	
July 1, 2017	Jordan Oesterle	Chicago Blackhawks	2-year, $1.3 million	
July 1, 2017	Tyler Pitlick	Dallas Stars	3-year, $3 million	
July 1, 2017	Benoit Pouliot	Buffalo Sabres	1-year, $1.15 million	
July 4, 2017	David Desharnais	New York Rangers	1-year, $1 million	
July 31, 2017	Justin Fontaine	Dinamo Minsk (KHL)	1-year	
July 31, 2017	David Musil	Oceláři Třinec (ELH)	1-year	
August 27, 2017	Matt Hendricks	Winnipeg Jets	1-year, $700,000	
August 31, 2017	Zach Pochiro	Allen Americans (ECHL)	1-year, $700,000	
September 7, 2017	Henrik Samuelsson	Idaho Steelheads (ECHL)	1-year	
November 16, 2017	Mark Fraser	HC TPS (Liiga)		
April 24, 2018	Iiro Pakarinen	Metallurg Magnitogorsk (KHL)		
June 5, 2018	Braden Christoffer	Bakersfield Condors (AHL)	1-year	

=== Claimed via waivers ===
Player	Previous team	Date	Ref
Nathan Walker	Washington Capitals	December 1, 2017	
Brandon Davidson	Montreal Canadiens	December 3, 2017	

=== Lost via waivers ===
Player	New team	Date	Ref
Nathan Walker	Washington Capitals	December 20, 2017	

=== Players released ===
Date	Player	Via	Ref
November 21, 2017	Ziyat Paigin	Contract termination	

=== Lost via retirement ===
Date	Player	Ref
July 13, 2017	Andrew Ference	

=== Player signings ===
Date	Player	Contract terms (in U.S. dollars)	Ref
June 16, 2017	Jujhar Khaira	2-year, $1.35 million contract extension	
June 23, 2017	Kris Russell	4-year, $16 million contract extension	
June 26, 2017	Zack Kassian	3-year, $5.85 million contract extension	
June 27, 2017	Eric Gryba	2-year, $1.8 million contract extension	
July 5, 2017	Connor McDavid	8-year, $100 million contract extension	
July 12, 2017	Joey LaLeggia	1-year, $700,000	
July 16, 2017	Dillon Simpson	1-year, $675,000	
August 10, 2017	Kailer Yamamoto	3-year, $2.775 million entry-level contract	
August 16, 2017	Leon Draisaitl	8-year, $68 million contract extension	
September 7, 2017	Dmitri Samorukov	3-year, $2.775 million entry-level contract	
March 6, 2018	Ostap Safin	3-year, $2.625 million entry-level contract	
March 15, 2018	Kirill Maksimov	3-year, $2.625 million entry-level contract	
April 8, 2018	Cooper Marody	3-year, $2.775 million entry-level contract	
April 14, 2018	Ty Rattie	1-year, $800,000 contract extension	
May 8, 2018	Tyler Vesel	1-year, $735,000 entry-level contract	
May 14, 2018	Stuart Skinner	3-year, $2.775 million entry-level contract	
June 3, 2018	Keegan Lowe	2-year, $1.35 million contract extension	
June 8, 2018	Patrick Russell	1-year, $700,000 contract extension	
June 8, 2018	Nolan Vesey	2-year, entry-level contract	
June 14, 2018	Drake Caggiula	2-year, $3 million contract extension	
June 19, 2018	Matt Benning	2-year, contract extension	

== Draft picks ==
Below are the Edmonton Oilers' selections at the 2017 NHL entry draft, which was held on June 23 and 24, 2017, at the United Center in Chicago, Illinois.

Round	#	Player	Pos	Nationality	College/Junior/Club team (League)
1	22	Kailer Yamamoto	C	United States	Spokane Chiefs (WHL)
3	78^{1}	Stuart Skinner	G	Canada	Lethbridge Hurricanes (WHL)
3	84	Dmitri Samorukov	D	Russia	Guelph Storm (OHL)
4	115	Ostap Safin	RW	Czech Republic	HC Sparta Praha (Czech Extraliga)
5	146	Kirill Maksimov	RW	Russia	Saginaw Spirit (OHL)
6	177	Skyler Brind'Amour	C	United States	Selects Academy U18 (USPHL U18)
7	208	Philip Kemp	D	United States	U.S. NTDP (USHL)

Draft notes:

1. The Calgary Flames' third-round pick went to the Edmonton Oilers as the result of a trade on June 24, 2017 that sent St. Louis' Third Round Pick and Vancouver's fifth-round pick both in 2017 (82nd and 126th overall) to Arizona in exchange for this pick.
