= Maxim Letunov =

Russian ice hockey player (born 1996)

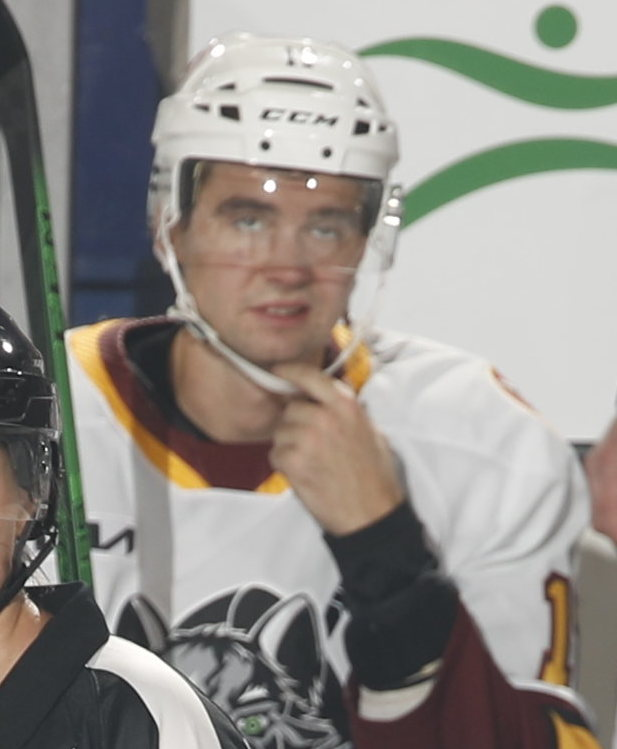
- Letunov with the Chicago Wolves in 2021
- Born: 20 February 1996 (age 30) Moscow, Russia
- Height: 6 ft 3 in (191 cm)
- Weight: 190 lb (86 kg; 13 st 8 lb)
- Position: Centre
- Shoots: Left
- KHL team Former teams: Dynamo Moscow; San Jose Sharks; Torpedo Nizhny Novgorod
- NHL draft: 52nd overall, 2014; St. Louis Blues
- Playing career: 2018–present

Maxim "Max" Vladimirovich Letunov (Russian: Максим Владимирович Летунов; born 20 February 1996) is a Russian professional ice hockey centre who plays for HC Dynamo Moscow of the Kontinental Hockey League (KHL).

== Playing career ==
Letunov was selected 52nd overall in the 2014 NHL entry draft by the St. Louis Blues. After playing for the University of Connecticut, Letunov was signed to an entry-level contract by the San Jose Sharks on 14 March 2018.

He made his NHL debut on 4 February 2020, in a 3–1 win over the Calgary Flames. His first goal came two days later, during a 6–3 win against the Edmonton Oilers.

As a group 6 free agent, Letunov left the Sharks and was signed to a one-year, two-way contract with the Carolina Hurricanes on 31 July 2021. After participating in the Hurricanes training camp, Letunov was assigned to AHL affiliate, the Chicago Wolves, to begin the 2021–22 season. He made 60 appearances with the Wolves, posting 13 goals and 23 points, before he was traded by the Hurricanes to the New York Rangers in exchange for Tarmo Reunanen on 28 March 2022.

Letunov as a free agent from the Rangers, opted to return to Russia and signed a contract with Torpedo Nizhny Novgorod for the 2022–23 season.

After four seasons with Torpedo, Letunov left the club as a free agent and was signed to a two-year contract with HC Dynamo Moscow on June 5, 2026.

== Career statistics ==
			Regular season					Playoffs
Season	Team	League	GP	G	A	Pts	PIM	GP	G	A	Pts	PIM
2013–14	Youngstown Phantoms	USHL	60	19	24	43	42	—	—	—	—	—
2014–15	Youngstown Phantoms	USHL	58	25	39	64	18	4	0	1	1	0
2015–16	U. of Connecticut	HE	36	16	24	40	2	—	—	—	—	—
2016–17	U. of Connecticut	HE	33	7	20	27	25	—	—	—	—	—
2017–18	U. of Connecticut	HE	36	12	16	28	12	—	—	—	—	—
2018–19	San Jose Barracuda	AHL	57	12	16	28	20	3	0	2	2	2
2019–20	San Jose Barracuda	AHL	50	12	28	40	12	—	—	—	—	—
2019–20	San Jose Sharks	NHL	3	1	0	1	0	—	—	—	—	—
2020–21	San Jose Barracuda	AHL	32	12	3	15	12	4	2	0	2	0
2021–22	Chicago Wolves	AHL	60	13	10	23	16	—	—	—	—	—
2021–22	Hartford Wolf Pack	AHL	13	2	3	5	6	—	—	—	—	—
2022–23	Torpedo Nizhny Novgorod	KHL	62	16	14	30	20	10	0	2	2	6
2023–24	Torpedo Nizhny Novgorod	KHL	66	25	23	48	30	5	1	0	1	0
2024–25	Torpedo Nizhny Novgorod	KHL	68	13	25	38	19	4	0	1	1	0
2025–26	Torpedo Nizhny Novgorod	KHL	60	12	16	28	18	10	1	5	6	2
NHL totals			3	1	0	1	0	—	—	—	—	—
KHL totals			256	66	78	144	87	29	2	8	10	8

== Awards and honors ==
Award	Year
USHL
Second All-Star Team	2015
College
HE All-Rookie Team	2016
HE Second All-Star Team	2016, 2018
