= Mike Sislo =

American ice hockey player

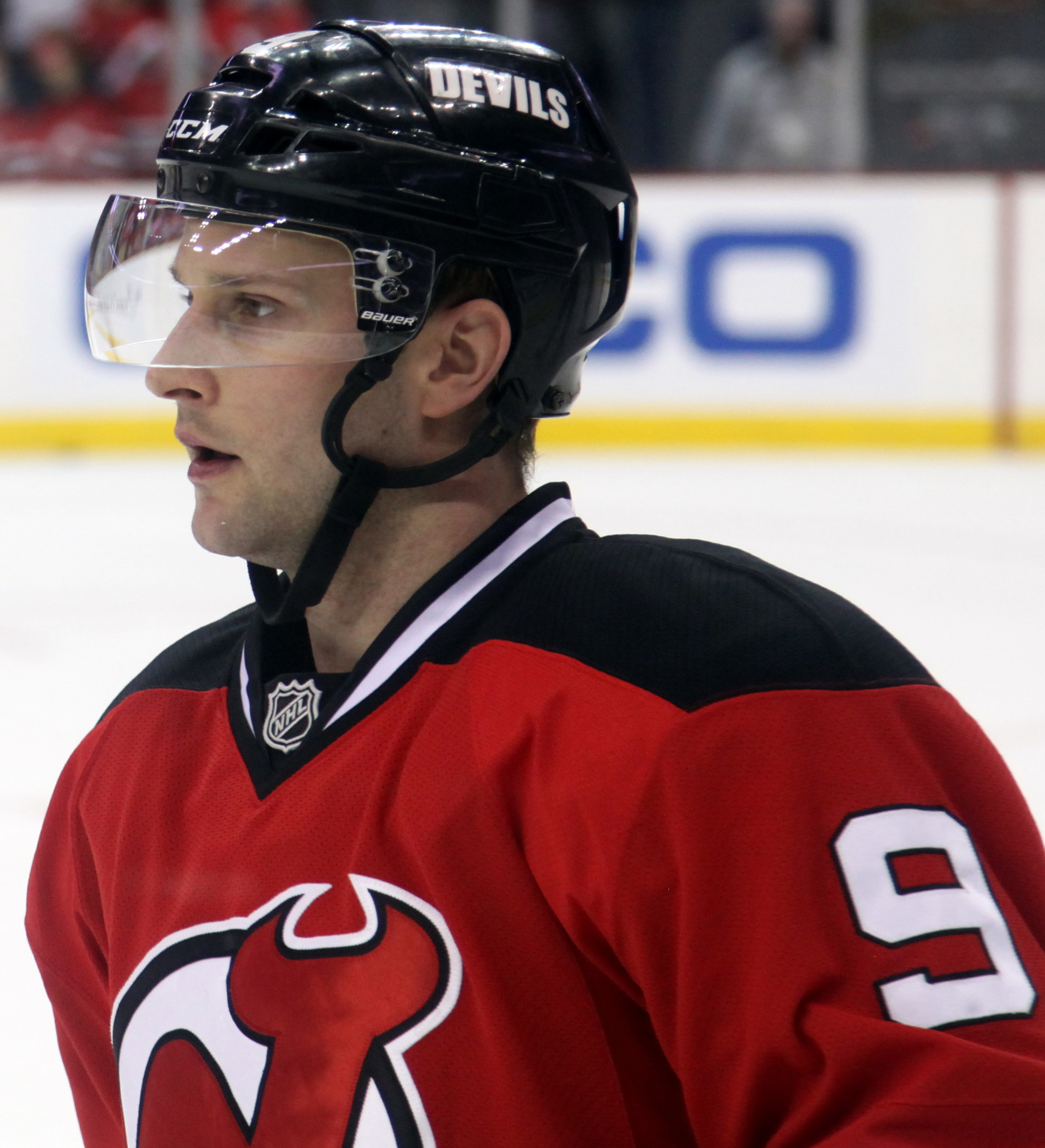
- Sislo with the New Jersey Devils in 2014
- Born: January 20, 1988 (age 38) Superior, Wisconsin, U.S.
- Height: 5 ft 11 in (180 cm)
- Weight: 190 lb (86 kg; 13 st 8 lb)
- Position: Right wing
- Shot: Right
- Played for: New Jersey Devils; Grizzlys Wolfsburg
- NHL draft: Undrafted
- Playing career: 2011–2019

Michael James Sislo (born January 20, 1988) is an American former professional ice hockey player. He played in the National Hockey League (NHL) with the New Jersey Devils.

== Playing career ==
On April 5, 2011, the New Jersey Devils signed Sislo as an undrafted free agent to a two-year, entry-level contract.

During the 2013–14 season, Sislo made his NHL debut with the New Jersey Devils, playing 8 minutes and 29 seconds and recording two shots on net, in a 5-3 loss to the visiting Chicago Blackhawks on January 3, 2014.

After five seasons within the Devils organization, Sislo left as a free agent on July 1, 2016, signing a one-year, two-way contract to join the Colorado Avalanche. Added with the expectation to carry the offensive load for American Hockey League (AHL) affiliate, the San Antonio Rampage, Sislo managed just six goals in 54 games in the 2016–17 season before he was loaned by the Avalanche in an AHL trade to the Toronto Marlies for Colin Smith on March 1, 2017. Sislo made an instant impact with the Marlies, regaining his scoring touch to finish the season with 8 goals and 16 points in 18 games.

On July 1, 2017, having left the Avalanche as a free agent, Sislo agreed to a one-year, two-way contract with the Arizona Coyotes. In the 2017–18 season, Sislo provided a veteran presence to the Coyotes AHL affiliate, the Tucson Roadrunners. He rebounded statistically from the previous season to record 23 goals and 47 points in 68 regular season games before helping Tucson advance to the second round in the postseason.

At the conclusion of the season on June 14, 2018, Sislo was traded by the Coyotes to the Buffalo Sabres along with Brandon Hickey in exchange for Hudson Fasching. Sislo's rights were left to expire by the Sabres, and as a free agent he agreed to a one-year, two-way contract with the New York Islanders on July 2, 2018.

After spending his first nine professional seasons contracted in the NHL, Sislo left as a free agent following the 2018–19 season in signing a European deal with German outfit, Grizzlys Wolfsburg of the Deutsche Eishockey Liga (DEL) on July 10, 2019. Sislo recorded just three assists through nine games before ending his career through persistent back injuries on January 11, 2019.

== Career statistics ==
			Regular season					Playoffs
Season	Team	League	GP	G	A	Pts	PIM	GP	G	A	Pts	PIM
2005–06	Green Bay Gamblers	USHL	57	3	3	6	36	3	0	0	0	5
2006–07	Green Bay Gamblers	USHL	60	23	26	49	28	4	3	1	4	2
2007–08	University of New Hampshire	HE	38	3	5	8	12	—	—	—	—	—
2008–09	University of New Hampshire	HE	38	19	12	31	12	—	—	—	—	—
2009–10	University of New Hampshire	HE	39	14	15	29	20	—	—	—	—	—
2010–11	University of New Hampshire	HE	39	15	33	48	38	—	—	—	—	—
2010–11	Albany Devils	AHL	3	0	0	0	0	—	—	—	—	—
2011–12	Albany Devils	AHL	59	9	18	27	20	—	—	—	—	—
2012–13	Albany Devils	AHL	61	13	13	26	46	—	—	—	—	—
2013–14	Albany Devils	AHL	59	23	18	41	26	4	1	1	2	0
2013–14	New Jersey Devils	NHL	14	0	0	0	0	—	—	—	—	—
2014–15	Albany Devils	AHL	65	20	20	40	53	—	—	—	—	—
2014–15	New Jersey Devils	NHL	10	0	1	1	2	—	—	—	—	—
2015–16	Albany Devils	AHL	57	27	26	53	18	9	2	5	7	6
2015–16	New Jersey Devils	NHL	18	3	1	4	4	—	—	—	—	—
2016–17	San Antonio Rampage	AHL	54	6	15	21	18	—	—	—	—	—
2016–17	Toronto Marlies	AHL	18	8	8	16	8	5	0	0	0	0
2017–18	Tucson Roadrunners	AHL	68	23	24	47	28	9	1	1	2	2
2018–19	Bridgeport Sound Tigers	AHL	39	6	9	15	14	—	—	—	—	—
2019–20	Grizzlys Wolfsburg	DEL	9	0	3	3	8	—	—	—	—	—
NHL totals			42	3	2	5	6	—	—	—	—	—
