= 2017–18 Chicago Blackhawks season =

National Hockey League team season

2017–18 Chicago Blackhawks
- Division: 7th Central
- Conference: 13th Western
- 2017–18 record: 33–39–10
- Home record: 18–18–5
- Road record: 15–21–5
- Goals for: 229
- Goals against: 256

Team information
- General manager: Stan Bowman
- Coach: Joel Quenneville
- Captain: Jonathan Toews
- Alternate captains: Duncan Keith; Brent Seabrook
- Arena: United Center
- Average attendance: 21,653
- Minor league affiliates: Rockford IceHogs (AHL); Indy Fuel (ECHL)

Team leaders
- Goals: Alex DeBrincat (28)
- Assists: Patrick Kane (49)
- Points: Patrick Kane (76)
- Penalty minutes: John Hayden (54)
- Plus/minus: Alex DeBrincat (+6)
- Wins: Corey Crawford (16)
- Goals against average: Corey Crawford (2.27)

The 2017–18 Chicago Blackhawks season was the 92nd season for the National Hockey League (NHL) franchise that was established on September 25, 1926. The Blackhawks finished the season with 76 points (19 points out of the final playoff spot) to finish in last place in the Central Division of the Western Conference. The season marked the first time since the 2007–08 season where the Blackhawks failed to make the Stanley Cup playoffs and the team's worst regular season performance since 2006–07.

Prior to the season, the Blackhawks made several moves in an attempt to make up for the prior season's playoff disappointment. As a result, the team traded their second-leading goal and point scorer from the prior season, Artemi Panarin, to the Columbus Blue Jackets for reacquiring Brandon Saad. In addition, the team traded arguably their most reliable defenseman, Niklas Hjalmarsson, to the Arizona Coyotes for defenseman Connor Murphy. Numerous other moves were made in an attempt to change the team. Also, forward Marian Hossa announced he would not play for the Blackhawks during the season due to a skin condition that was aggravated by wearing hockey equipment. As a result, Hossa was placed on long-term injured reserve.

Patrick Kane led the team in scoring with 76 points while rookie forward Alex DeBrincat led the team in goals with 28. The Blackhawks had five players score 20 or more goals: DeBrincat, Kane (27), Nick Schmaltz (21), Artem Anisimov (20) and Jonathan Toews (20). Goalie Corey Crawford only played 28 games, missing the final 47 games of the season with an undisclosed injury.

Despite the disappointing season, team president John McDonough announced that general manager Stan Bowman and coach Joel Quenneville would return for the 2018–19 season.

== Standings ==
Central Division
Pos	Team	GP	W	L	OTL	ROW	GF	GA	GD	Pts
1	p – Nashville Predators	82	53	18	11	47	267	211	+56	117
2	x – Winnipeg Jets	82	52	20	10	48	277	218	+59	114
3	x – Minnesota Wild	82	45	26	11	42	253	232	+21	101
4	x – Colorado Avalanche	82	43	30	9	41	257	237	+20	95
5	St. Louis Blues	82	44	32	6	41	226	222	+4	94
6	Dallas Stars	82	42	32	8	38	235	225	+10	92
7	Chicago Blackhawks	82	33	39	10	32	229	256	−27	76

Source: National Hockey League
p – Clinched Presidents' Trophy; x – Clinched playoff spot

Western Conference Wild Card
Pos	Div	Team	GP	W	L	OTL	ROW	GF	GA	GD	Pts
1	PA	x – Los Angeles Kings	82	45	29	8	43	239	203	+36	98
2	CE	x – Colorado Avalanche	82	43	30	9	41	257	237	+20	95
3	CE	St. Louis Blues	82	44	32	6	41	226	222	+4	94
4	CE	Dallas Stars	82	42	32	8	38	235	225	+10	92
5	PA	Calgary Flames	82	37	35	10	35	218	248	−30	84
6	PA	Edmonton Oilers	82	36	40	6	31	234	263	−29	78
7	CE	Chicago Blackhawks	82	33	39	10	32	229	256	−27	76
8	PA	Vancouver Canucks	82	31	40	11	31	218	264	−46	73
9	PA	Arizona Coyotes	82	29	41	12	27	208	256	−48	70

Source: National Hockey League
x – Clinched playoff spot

== Schedule and results ==
=== Pre-season ===
The Blackhawks published their preseason schedule on June 8, 2017.

2017 preseason game log: 4–2–0 (Home: 2–1–0; Road: 2–1–0)
#	Date	Opponent	Score	OT	Decision	Arena	Attendance	Record	Recap
1	September 19	@ Columbus	5–2		Forsberg	Nationwide Arena	10,548	1–0–0	W1
2	September 21	Detroit	6–1		Crawford	United Center	20,342	2–0–0	W2
3	September 23	Columbus	2–3		Berube	United Center	20,395	2–1–0	L1
4	September 25	@ Boston	2–4		Crawford	TD Garden	16,374	2–2–0	L2
5	September 28	@ Detroit	4–2		Forsberg	Little Caesars Arena	17,089	3–2–0	W1
6	September 30	Boston	1–0		Crawford	United Center	20,703	4–2–0	W2

=== Regular season ===
The Blackhawks released their regular season schedule on June 22, 2017.

2017–18 game log

October: 5–5–2 (Home: 3–2–1; Road: 2–3–1)
#	Date	Opponent	Score	OT	Decision	Arena	Attendance	Record	Pts	Recap
1	October 5	Pittsburgh	10–1		Crawford	United Center	21,705	1–0–0	2	W1
2	October 7	Columbus	5–1		Crawford	United Center	21,264	2–0–0	4	W2
3	October 9	@ Toronto	3–4	OT	Forsberg	Air Canada Centre	19,456	2–0–1	5	O1
4	October 10	@ Montreal	3–1		Crawford	Bell Centre	21,302	3–0–1	7	W1
5	October 12	Minnesota	2–5		Crawford	United Center	21,386	3–1–1	7	L1
6	October 14	Nashville	2–1	OT	Crawford	United Center	21,564	4–1–1	9	W1
7	October 18	@ St. Louis	2–5		Crawford	Scottrade Center	18,752	4–2–1	9	L1
8	October 19	Edmonton	1–2	OT	Forsberg	United Center	21,444	4–2–2	10	O1
9	October 21	@ Arizona	4–2		Crawford	Gila River Arena	13,777	5–2–2	12	W1
10	October 24	@ Vegas	2–4		Crawford	T-Mobile Arena	18,108	5–3–2	12	L1
11	October 27	Nashville	1–2		Crawford	United Center	21,524	5–4–2	12	L2
12	October 28	@ Colorado	3–6		Forsberg	Pepsi Center	17,360	5–5–2	12	L3

November: 7–4–2 (Home: 3–2–1; Road: 4–2–1)
#	Date	Opponent	Score	OT	Decision	Arena	Attendance	Record	Pts	Recap
13	November 1	Philadelphia	3–0		Crawford	United Center	21,524	6–5–2	14	W1
14	November 4	@ Minnesota	2–0		Crawford	Xcel Energy Center	19,218	7–5–2	16	W2
15	November 5	Montreal	0–2		Crawford	United Center	21,871	7–6–2	16	L1
16	November 9	@ Philadelphia	1–3		Crawford	Wells Fargo Center	19,738	7–7–2	16	L2
17	November 11	@ Carolina	4–3	OT	Forsberg	PNC Arena	16,778	8–7–2	18	W1
18	November 12	New Jersey	5–7		Crawford	United Center	21,487	8–8–2	18	L1
19	November 15	NY Rangers	6–3		Crawford	United Center	21,528	9–8–2	20	W1
20	November 18	@ Pittsburgh	2–1		Crawford	PPG Paints Arena	18,638	10–8–2	22	W2
21	November 22	@ Tampa Bay	2–3	OT	Crawford	Amalie Arena	19,092	10–8–3	23	O1
22	November 25	@ Florida	4–1		Crawford	BB&T Center	14,302	11–8–3	25	W1
23	November 27	Anaheim	7–3		Crawford	United Center	21,619	12–8–3	27	W2
24	November 28	@ Nashville	2–3		Forsberg	Bridgestone Arena	17,187	12–9–3	27	L1
25	November 30	Dallas	3–4	OT	Crawford	United Center	21,589	12–9–4	28	O1

December: 6–5–2 (Home: 4–1–0; Road: 2–4–2)
#	Date	Opponent	Score	OT	Decision	Arena	Attendance	Record	Pts	Recap
26	December 2	@ Dallas	2–3	SO	Forsberg	American Airlines Center	18,532	12–9–5	29	O2
27	December 3	Los Angeles	1–3		Forsberg	United Center	21,622	12–10–5	29	L1
28	December 6	@ Washington	2–6		Forsberg	Capital One Arena	18,506	12–11–5	29	L2
29	December 8	Buffalo	3–2	OT	Crawford	United Center	21,542	13–11–5	31	W1
30	December 10	Arizona	3–1		Crawford	United Center	21,654	14–11–5	33	W2
31	December 12	Florida	3–2	OT	Crawford	United Center	21,795	15–11–5	35	W3
32	December 14	@ Winnipeg	5–1		Crawford	Bell MTS Place	15,321	16–11–5	37	W4
33	December 17	Minnesota	4–1		Crawford	United Center	21,813	17–11–5	39	W5
34	December 21	@ Dallas	0–4		Crawford	American Airlines Center	18,532	17–12–5	39	L1
35	December 23	@ New Jersey	1–4		Crawford	Prudential Center	16,514	17–13–5	39	L2
36	December 28	@ Vancouver	2–5		Forsberg	Rogers Arena	18,865	17–14–5	39	L3
37	December 29	@ Edmonton	4–3	OT	Glass	Rogers Place	18,347	18–14–5	41	W1
38	December 31	@ Calgary	3–4	OT	Glass	Scotiabank Saddledome	19,289	18–14–6	42	O1

January: 6–5–1 (Home: 2–5–1; Road: 4–0–0)
#	Date	Opponent	Score	OT	Decision	Arena	Attendance	Record	Pts	Recap
39	January 3	@ NY Rangers	5–2		Glass	Madison Square Garden	18,006	19–14–6	44	W1
40	January 5	Vegas	4–5		Glass	United Center	21,933	19–15–6	44	L1
41	January 7	Edmonton	4–1		Forsberg	United Center	21,901	20–15–6	46	W1
42	January 9	@ Ottawa	8–2		Forsberg	Canadian Tire Centre	14,007	21–15–6	48	W2
43	January 10	Minnesota	1–2		Forsberg	United Center	21,721	21–16–6	48	L1
44	January 12	Winnipeg	2–1		Glass	United Center	21,588	22–16–6	50	W1
45	January 14	Detroit	0–4		Glass	United Center	21,830	22–17–6	50	L1
46	January 20	NY Islanders	3–7		Forsberg	United Center	21,882	22–18–6	50	L2
47	January 22	Tampa Bay	0–2		Glass	United Center	21,662	22–19–6	50	L3
48	January 24	Toronto	2–3	OT	Glass	United Center	21,563	22–19–7	51	O1
49	January 25	@ Detroit	5–1		Forsberg	Little Caesars Arena	19,515	23–19–7	53	W1
50	January 30	@ Nashville	2–1		Forsberg	Bridgestone Arena	17,172	24–19–7	55	W2

February: 3–9–1 (Home: 3–4–0; Road: 0–5–1)
#	Date	Opponent	Score	OT	Decision	Arena	Attendance	Record	Pts	Recap
51	February 1	@ Vancouver	2–4		Forsberg	Rogers Arena	18,144	24–20–7	55	L1
52	February 3	@ Calgary	3–4	OT	Glass	Scotiabank Saddledome	19,289	24–20–8	56	O1
53	February 6	Calgary	2–3		Glass	United Center	21,480	24–21–8	56	L1
54	February 8	Dallas	2–4		Forsberg	United Center	21,422	24–22–8	56	L2
55	February 10	@ Minnesota	0–3		Glass	Xcel Energy Center	19,227	24–23–8	56	L3
56	February 12	@ Arizona	1–6		Forsberg	Gila River Arena	14,357	24–24–8	56	L4
57	February 13	@ Vegas	2–5		Glass	T-Mobile Arena	18,085	24–25–8	56	L5
58	February 15	Anaheim	2–3		Forsberg	United Center	21,415	24–26–8	56	L6
59	February 17	Washington	7–1		Forsberg	United Center	22,066	25–26–8	58	W1
60	February 19	Los Angeles	1–3		Forsberg	United Center	21,339	25–27–8	58	L1
61	February 21	Ottawa	3–2	SO	Forsberg	United Center	21,532	26–27–8	60	W1
62	February 23	San Jose	3–1		Berube	United Center	21,906	27–27–8	62	W2
63	February 24	@ Columbus	2–3		Forsberg	Nationwide Arena	18,792	27–28–8	62	L1

March: 5–9–2 (Home: 3–3–2; Road: 2–6–0)
#	Date	Opponent	Score	OT	Decision	Arena	Attendance	Record	Pts	Recap
64	March 1	@ San Jose	2–7		Berube	SAP Center	17,086	27–29–8	62	L2
65	March 3	@ Los Angeles	5–3		Forsberg	Staples Center	18,230	28–29–8	64	W1
66	March 4	@ Anaheim	3–6		Forsberg	Honda Center	16,989	28–30–8	64	L1
67	March 6	Colorado	2–1	OT	Berube	United Center	21,508	29–30–8	66	W1
68	March 8	Carolina	2–3		Berube	United Center	21,681	29–31–8	66	L1
69	March 10	@ Boston	4–7		Berube	TD Garden	17,565	29–32–8	66	L2
70	March 11	Boston	3–1		Forsberg	United Center	21,819	30–32–8	68	W1
71	March 15	@ Winnipeg	2–6		Forsberg	Bell MTS Place	15,321	30–33–8	68	L1
72	March 17	@ Buffalo	3–5		Berube	KeyBank Center	19,070	30–34–8	68	L2
73	March 18	St. Louis	4–5	OT	Berube	United Center	21,687	30–34–9	69	O1
74	March 20	Colorado	1–5		Forsberg	United Center	21,633	30–35–9	69	L1
75	March 22	Vancouver	2–5		Berube	United Center	21,526	30–36–9	69	L2
76	March 24	@ NY Islanders	3–1		Forsberg	Barclays Center	13,091	31–36–9	71	W1
77	March 26	San Jose	3–4	SO	Forsberg	United Center	21,712	31–36–10	72	O1
78	March 29	Winnipeg	6–2		Delia	United Center	21,839	32–36–10	74	W1
79	March 30	@ Colorado	0–5		Delia	Pepsi Center	17,985	32–37–10	74	L1

April: 1–2–0 (Home: 0–1–0; Road: 1–1–0)
#	Date	Opponent	Score	OT	Decision	Arena	Attendance	Record	Pts	Recap
80	April 4	@ St. Louis	4–3		Berube	Scottrade Center	18,935	33–37–10	76	W1
81	April 6	St. Louis	1–4		Berube	United Center	22,218	33–38–10	76	L1
82	April 7	@ Winnipeg	1–4		Glass	Bell MTS Place	15,321	33–39–10	76	L2

Legend: Win (2 points) Loss (0 points) Overtime/shootout loss (1 point)

=== Detailed records ===
Western Conference
Opponent	Home	Away	Total	Pts	Goals scored	Goals allowed
Central Division
Chicago Blackhawks	—	—	—	—	—	—
Colorado Avalanche	1–1–0	0–2–0	1–3–0	2	6	17
Dallas Stars	0–1–1	0–1–1	0–2–2	2	7	15
Minnesota Wild	1–2–0	1–1–0	2–3–0	4	9	11
Nashville Predators	1–1–0	1–1–0	2–2–0	4	7	7
St. Louis Blues	0–1–1	1–1–0	1–2–1	3	10	17
Winnipeg Jets	2–0–0	1–2–0	3–2–0	6	16	14
Total	5–6–2	4–8–1	9–14–3	21	58	81
Pacific Division
Anaheim Ducks	1–1–0	0–1–0	1–2–0	2	12	12
Arizona Coyotes	1–0–0	1–1–0	2–1–0	4	8	9
Calgary Flames	0–1–0	0–0–2	0–1–2	2	8	11
Edmonton Oilers	1–0–1	1–0–0	2–0–1	5	9	6
Los Angeles Kings	0–2–0	1–0–0	1–2–0	2	7	9
San Jose Sharks	1–0–1	0–1–0	1–1–1	3	8	12
Vancouver Canucks	0–1–0	0–2–0	0–3–0	0	6	14
Vegas Golden Knights	0–1–0	0–2–0	0–3–0	0	8	14
Total	4–6–2	3–7–2	7–13–4	18	66	87

Eastern Conference
Opponent	Home	Away	Total	Pts	Goals scored	Goals allowed
Atlantic Division
Boston Bruins	1–0–0	0–1–0	1–1–0	2	7	8
Buffalo Sabres	1–0–0	0–1–0	1–1–0	2	6	7
Detroit Red Wings	0–1–0	1–0–0	1–1–0	2	5	5
Florida Panthers	1–0–0	1–0–0	2–0–0	4	7	3
Montreal Canadiens	0–1–0	1–0–0	1–1–0	2	3	3
Ottawa Senators	1–0–0	1–0–0	2–0–0	4	11	4
Tampa Bay Lightning	0–1–0	0–0–1	0–1–1	1	2	5
Toronto Maple Leafs	0–0–1	0–0–1	0–0–2	2	5	7
Total	4–3–1	4–2–2	8–5–3	19	48	42
Metropolitan Division
Carolina Hurricanes	0–1–0	1–0–0	1–1–0	2	6	6
Columbus Blue Jackets	1–0–0	0–1–0	1–1–0	2	7	4
New Jersey Devils	0–1–0	0–1–0	0–2–0	0	6	11
New York Islanders	0–1–0	1–0–0	1–1–0	2	6	8
New York Rangers	1–0–0	1–0–0	2–0–0	4	8	5
Philadelphia Flyers	1–0–0	0–1–0	1–1–0	2	4	3
Pittsburgh Penguins	1–0–0	1–0–0	2–0–0	4	12	2
Washington Capitals	1–0–0	0–1–0	1–1–0	2	9	7
Total	5–3–0	4–4–0	9–7–0	18	58	46

== Player statistics ==
Final Stats

=== Skaters ===
Regular season
Player	GP	G	A	Pts	+/−	PIM
Patrick Kane	82	27	49	76	−20	30
Alex DeBrincat	82	28	24	52	6	6
Nick Schmaltz	78	21	31	52	1	18
Jonathan Toews	74	20	32	52	−1	47
Brandon Saad	82	18	17	35	−10	14
Duncan Keith	82	2	30	32	−29	28
Artem Anisimov	72	20	11	31	−17	22
Brent Seabrook	81	7	19	26	−3	38
Ryan Hartman^{‡}	57	8	17	25	5	58
Vinnie Hinostroza	50	7	18	25	5	10
Patrick Sharp	70	10	11	21	−16	14
Jan Rutta	57	6	14	20	−1	22
Richard Panik^{‡}	37	6	10	16	3	26
Erik Gustafsson	35	5	11	16	1	6
Jordan Oesterle	55	5	10	15	−11	8
Connor Murphy	76	2	12	14	−3	34
John Hayden	47	4	9	13	−4	54
Gustav Forsling	41	3	10	13	−2	8
Tommy Wingels^{‡}	57	7	5	12	−10	43
David Kampf	46	4	7	11	−9	12
Tomas Jurco	29	6	4	10	1	12
Lance Bouma	53	3	6	9	1	36
Anthony Duclair^{†}	23	2	6	8	0	6
Michal Kempny^{‡}	31	1	6	7	13	12
Cody Franson	23	1	6	7	−1	8
Tanner Kero	8	1	2	3	1	0
Carl Dahlstrom	11	0	3	3	−2	0
Dylan Sikura	5	0	3	3	2	0
Matthew Highmore	13	2	0	2	−4	0
Andreas Martinsen	9	1	0	1	−1	17
Blake Hillman	4	1	0	1	−1	0
Victor Ejdsell	6	0	1	1	−1	0

=== Goaltenders ===
Regular season
Player	GP	GS	TOI	W	L	OT	GA	GAA	SA	SV%	SO	G	A	PIM
Corey Crawford	28	27	1584	16	9	2	60	2.27	842	.929	2	0	0	0
Anton Forsberg	35	30	1715	10	16	4	85	2.97	921	.908	0	0	1	0
Jeff Glass	15	13	821	3	7	3	46	3.36	452	.898	0	0	0	2
Jean-Francois Berube	13	10	667	3	6	1	42	3.78	398	.894	0	0	0	0
Collin Delia	2	2	106	1	1	0	7	4.04	63	.889	0	0	0	2
Scott Foster	1	0	14	0	0	0	0	0.00	7	1.000	0	0	0	0

†Denotes player spent time with another team before joining Blackhawks. Stats reflect time with Blackhawks only.
‡Left team mid-season. Stats reflect time with Blackhawks only.

== Awards and honours ==
=== Awards ===
Regular season
Player	Award	Awarded
C. Crawford	NHL First Star of the Week	November 6, 2017
P. Kane	NHL First Star of the Week	December 18, 2017
P. Kane	NHL All-Star game selection	January 28, 2018

=== Milestones ===
Regular season
Player	Milestone	Reached
Alex DeBrincat	1st career NHL game 1st career NHL assist 1st career NHL point	October 5, 2017
Jan Rutta	1st career NHL game 1st career NHL assist 1st career NHL point	October 5, 2017
Patrick Sharp	600 career NHL points	October 5, 2017
Jan Rutta	1st career NHL goal	October 7, 2017
Alex DeBrincat	1st career NHL goal	October 10, 2017
John Hayden	1st career NHL fight	October 12, 2017
Ryan Hartman	100th career NHL game	November 9, 2017
Richard Panik	100th career NHL point	November 15, 2017
Artem Anisimov	1st career NHL hat trick	November 15, 2017
Alex DeBrincat	1st career NHL hat trick	November 27, 2017
Tommy Wingels	400th career NHL game	December 10, 2017
Patrick Sharp	900th career NHL game	December 12, 2017
Patrick Kane	300th career NHL goal	December 24, 2017
David Kampf	1st career NHL game	December 28, 2017
Jeff Glass	1st career NHL game 1st career NHL start 1st career NHL win	December 29, 2017
Jordan Oesterle	1st career NHL goal	December 29, 2017
Nick Schmaltz	100th career NHL game	December 29, 2017
David Kampf	1st career NHL assist 1st career NHL point	January 3, 2018
David Kampf	1st career NHL goal	January 12, 2018
Erik Gustafsson	1st career NHL goal	January 20, 2018
Patrick Kane	800th career NHL point	January 20, 2018
Artem Anisimov	300th career NHL point	February 8, 2018
Carl Dahlstrom	1st career NHL game	February 10, 2018
Carl Dahlstrom	1st career NHL assist 1st career NHL point	February 17, 2018
Patrick Kane	500th career NHL assist	February 17, 2018
Patrick Kane	800th career NHL game	February 19, 2018
Joel Quenneville	1,600th career NHL regular season game coached	February 21, 2018
Matthew Highmore	1st career NHL game	March 1, 2018
Matthew Highmore	1st career NHL goal 1st career NHL point	March 10, 2018
Joel Quenneville	2nd all time in NHL regular season games coached (1,608 games)	March 11, 2018
Victor Ejdsell	1st career NHL game	March 26, 2018
Dylan Sikura	1st career NHL game 1st career NHL assist 1st career NHL point	March 29, 2018
Collin Delia	1st career NHL game 1st career NHL start 1st career NHL win	March 29, 2018
Brent Seabrook	1,000th career NHL game	March 29, 2018
Scott Foster	1st career NHL game	March 29, 2018
Victor Ejdsell	1st career NHL point 1st career NHL assist	March 29, 2018
Blake Hillman	1st career NHL game	March 30, 2018
Blake Hillman	1st career NHL goal 1st career NHL point	April 4, 2018

== Transactions ==
The Blackhawks have been involved in the following transactions during the 2017–18 season.

=== Trades ===
Date	Details		Ref
June 23, 2017	To Arizona Coyotes Niklas Hjalmarsson	To Chicago Blackhawks Connor Murphy; Laurent Dauphin
June 23, 2017	To Columbus Blue Jackets Artemi Panarin; Tyler Motte; NYI's 6th-round pick in 2017	To Chicago Blackhawks Brandon Saad; Anton Forsberg; 5th-round pick in 2018
July 2, 2017	To Vegas Golden Knights Marcus Kruger	To Chicago Blackhawks Future considerations
October 4, 2017	To Montreal Canadiens Kyle Baun	To Chicago Blackhawks Andreas Martinsen
January 10, 2018	To Arizona Coyotes Laurent Dauphin; Richard Panik	To Chicago Blackhawks Adam Clendening; Anthony Duclair
February 15, 2018	To Ottawa Senators Ville Pokka	To Chicago Blackhawks Chris DiDomenico
February 19, 2018	To Washington Capitals Michal Kempny	To Chicago Blackhawks Conditional 3rd-round pick in 2018
February 26, 2018	To Nashville Predators Ryan Hartman; 5th-round pick in 2018	To Chicago Blackhawks Victor Ejdsell; 1st-round pick in 2018; 4th-round pick in 2018
February 26, 2018	To Boston Bruins Tommy Wingels	To Chicago Blackhawks Conditional 5th-round pick in 2019

=== Free agents acquired ===
Date	Player	Former team	Contract terms (in U.S. dollars)	Ref
July 1, 2017	Jean-Francois Berube	Vegas Golden Knights	2-year, $1.5 million	
July 1, 2017	Lance Bouma	Calgary Flames	1-year, $1 million	
July 1, 2017	Jordan Oesterle	Edmonton Oilers	2-year, $1.3 million	
July 1, 2017	Patrick Sharp	Dallas Stars	1-year, $1 million	
July 1, 2017	Tommy Wingels	Ottawa Senators	1-year, $750,000	
July 28, 2017	Collin Delia	Merrimack Warriors	2-year, $1.85 million entry-level contract	
October 4, 2017	Cody Franson	Buffalo Sabres	1-year, $1 million	
March 6, 2018	Tyler Sikura	Rockford IceHogs	1-year, $650,000	
May 21, 2018	Dominik Kahun	EHC Red Bull München	2-year, $7.55 million entry-level contract	
May 21, 2018	Kevin Lankinen	HIFK	2-year, $2.275 million entry-level contract	
May 21, 2018	Darren Raddysh	Rockford IceHogs	2-year, $1.46 million entry-level contract	
May 31, 2018	Jacob Nilsson	Mora IK	1-year, $1.1375 million entry-level contract	

=== Free agents lost ===
Date	Player	New team	Contract terms (in U.S. dollars)	Ref
May 5, 2017	Martin Lundberg	Växjö Lakers	Unknown	
July 1, 2017	Pierre-Cedric Labrie	Nashville Predators	1-year, $650,000	
July 3, 2017	Lars Johansson	CSKA Moscow	1-year	
July 4, 2017	Michael Latta	Arizona Coyotes	1-year, $650,000	
July 7, 2017	Dennis Rasmussen	Anaheim Ducks	1-year, $725,000	
July 24, 2017	Johnny Oduya	Ottawa Senators	1-year, $1 million	
August 31, 2017	Nolan Valleau	Orlando Solar Bears	1-year	
September 11, 2017	Brandon Mashinter	San Jose Sharks	1-year, $650,000	
October 7, 2017	Mac Carruth	Fehérvár AV19	1-year	
October 12, 2017	Andrew Desjardins	Adler Mannheim	1-year	
June 13, 2018	Chris DiDomenico	SCL Tigers	2-year	

=== Claimed via waivers ===
Player	Previous team	Date	Ref

=== Lost via waivers ===
Player	New team	Date	Ref

=== Players released ===
Date	Player	Via	Ref

=== Lost via retirement ===
Date	Player	Ref
July 17, 2017	Brian Campbell	

=== Player signings ===
Date	Player	Contract terms (in U.S. dollars)	Ref
June 26, 2017	Anton Forsberg	2-year, $1.5 million	
June 26, 2017	Tomas Jurco	1-year, $800,000	
June 27, 2017	Ville Pokka	1-year, $650,000	
July 14, 2017	Erik Gustafsson	1-year, $650,000	
March 6, 2018	Erik Gustafsson	2-year, $2.4 million contract extension	
March 8, 2018	Jan Rutta	1-year, $2.3 million contract extension	
March 26, 2018	Dylan Sikura	2-year, $2.775 million entry-level contract	
March 26, 2018	Joni Tuulola	2-year, $1.85 million entry-level contract	
March 27, 2018	Blake Hillman	2-year, $1.85 million entry-level contract	
April 13, 2018	Dennis Gilbert	3-year, $2.775 million entry-level contract	
May 21, 2018	Lucas Carlsson	3-year, $2.775 million entry-level contract	
June 7, 2018	Andreas Martinsen	1-year, $650,000 contract extension	
June 12, 2018	Henri Jokiharju	3-year, $3.8375 million entry-level contract	
June 15, 2018	John Hayden	2-year, $1.5 million contract extension	
June 15, 2018	Vinnie Hinostroza	2-year, $3 million contract extension	

== Draft picks ==
Below are the Chicago Blackhawks' selections at the 2017 NHL entry draft, which was held on June 23 and 24, 2017 at the United Center in Chicago.

Round	#	Player	Pos	Nationality	College/Junior/Club team (League)
1	29^{1}	Henri Jokiharju	D	Finland	Portland Winterhawks (WHL)
2	57	Ian Mitchell	D	Canada	Spruce Grove Saints (AJHL)
3	70^{2}	Andrei Altybarmakyan	RW	Russia	SKA-Neva St. Petersburg (VHL)
3	90^{3}	Evan Barratt	C	United States	U.S. National Team Development Program (USHL)
4	112^{4}	Tim Soderlund	C	Sweden	Skellefteå AIK (SHL)
4	119	Roope Laavainen	D	Finland	Jokerit U20 (Jr. A SM-liiga)
5	144^{5}	Parker Foo	LW	Canada	Brooks Bandits (AJHL)
5	150	Jakub Galvas	D	Czech Republic	HC Olomouc (Czech Extraliga)
7	215^{6}	Josh Ess	D	United States	Lakeville South (USHS)

Notes:

1. The Anaheim Ducks' first-round pick went to the Chicago Blackhawks as the result of a trade on June 23, 2017, that sent a first-round pick in 2017 (26th overall) to Dallas in exchange for a third-round pick in 2017 (70th overall) and this pick.
2. The Dallas Stars' third-round pick went to the Chicago Blackhawks as the result of a trade on June 23, 2017, that sent a first-round pick in 2017 (26th overall) to Dallas in exchange for Anaheim's first-round pick in 2017 (29th overall) and this pick.
3. The Ottawa Senators' third-round pick went to the Chicago Blackhawks as the result of a trade on April 28, 2017, that sent Scott Darling to Carolina in exchange for this pick.
4. The San Jose Sharks' fourth-round pick went to the Chicago Blackhawks as the result of a trade on June 24, 2017, that sent Carolina's fifth-round pick and a sixth-round pick both in 2017 (135th and 181st overall) to Vancouver in exchange for this pick.
5. The St. Louis Blues' fifth-round pick went to the Chicago Blackhawks as the result of a trade on June 25, 2016, that sent a Florida's fifth-round pick in 2016 to St. Louis in exchange for this pick.
6. The Anaheim Ducks' seventh-round pick went to the Chicago Blackhawks as the result of a trade on February 29, 2016, that sent Corey Tropp to Anaheim in exchange for Tim Jackman and this pick.
