= 2017–18 Vancouver Canucks season =

NHL hockey team season

2017–18 Vancouver Canucks
- Division: 7th Pacific
- Conference: 14th Western
- 2017–18 record: 31–40–11
- Home record: 16–18–7
- Road record: 15–22–4
- Goals for: 218
- Goals against: 264

Team information
- General manager: Jim Benning
- Coach: Travis Green
- Captain: Henrik Sedin
- Alternate captains: Michael Del Zotto; Alexander Edler; Daniel Sedin; Brandon Sutter; Christopher Tanev
- Arena: Rogers Arena
- Average attendance: 18,078
- Minor league affiliates: Utica Comets (AHL); Kalamazoo Wings (ECHL)

Team leaders
- Goals: Brock Boeser (29)
- Assists: Henrik Sedin (47)
- Points: Brock Boeser; Daniel Sedin (55)
- Penalty minutes: Derek Dorsett (74)
- Plus/minus: Brandon Sutter (+8)
- Wins: Jacob Markstrom (23)
- Goals against average: Jacob Markstrom (2.71)

The 2017–18 Vancouver Canucks season was the 48th season for the National Hockey League (NHL) franchise that was established on May 22, 1970. The Canucks missed the Stanley Cup playoffs for the third consecutive season. This was the last season for both Henrik and Daniel Sedin, who both announced their retirements on April 2, 2018, after 18-season NHL careers.

== Standings ==
Pacific Division
Pos	Team	GP	W	L	OTL	ROW	GF	GA	GD	Pts
1	y – Vegas Golden Knights	82	51	24	7	47	272	228	+44	109
2	x – Anaheim Ducks	82	44	25	13	40	235	216	+19	101
3	x – San Jose Sharks	82	45	27	10	40	252	229	+23	100
4	x – Los Angeles Kings	82	45	29	8	43	239	203	+36	98
5	Calgary Flames	82	37	35	10	35	218	248	−30	84
6	Edmonton Oilers	82	36	40	6	31	234	263	−29	78
7	Vancouver Canucks	82	31	40	11	31	218	264	−46	73
8	Arizona Coyotes	82	29	41	12	27	208	256	−48	70

Source: National Hockey League
x – Clinched playoff spot; y – Clinched division

Western Conference Wild Card
Pos	Div	Team	GP	W	L	OTL	ROW	GF	GA	GD	Pts
1	PA	x – Los Angeles Kings	82	45	29	8	43	239	203	+36	98
2	CE	x – Colorado Avalanche	82	43	30	9	41	257	237	+20	95
3	CE	St. Louis Blues	82	44	32	6	41	226	222	+4	94
4	CE	Dallas Stars	82	42	32	8	38	235	225	+10	92
5	PA	Calgary Flames	82	37	35	10	35	218	248	−30	84
6	PA	Edmonton Oilers	82	36	40	6	31	234	263	−29	78
7	CE	Chicago Blackhawks	82	33	39	10	32	229	256	−27	76
8	PA	Vancouver Canucks	82	31	40	11	31	218	264	−46	73
9	PA	Arizona Coyotes	82	29	41	12	27	208	256	−48	70

Source: National Hockey League
x – Clinched playoff spot

== Schedule and results ==
=== Preseason ===
The preseason schedule was released on June 14, 2017.

2017 preseason game log: 4–3–1 (Home: 2–1–1; Road: 2–2–0)
#	Date	Visitor	Score	Home	OT	Decision	Attendance	Record	Recap
1	September 16	Vancouver	4–3	Los Angeles	OT	Nilsson	11,846	1–0–0	Recap
2	September 17	Vegas	9–4	Vancouver		Bachman	15,565	1–1–0	Recap
3	September 20	Vancouver	5–3	Calgary		Demko	18,232	2–1–0	Recap
4^{[a]}	September 21	Vancouver	2–5	Los Angeles		–	10,088	2–2–0	Recap
5	September 22	Vancouver	3–5	Edmonton		Bachman	18,347	2–3–0	Recap
6^{[b]}	September 23	Los Angeles	4–3	Vancouver	SO	–	12,759	2–3–1	Recap
7	September 28	Calgary	1–3	Vancouver		Nilsson	14,712	3–3–1	Recap
8	September 30	Edmonton	2–3	Vancouver		Markstrom	16,637	4–3–1	Recap
Notes:^{a} Game was played at Mercedes-Benz Arena in Shanghai, China.^{b} Game was played at LeSports Center in Beijing, China.

=== Regular season ===
The regular season schedule was published on June 22, 2017.

2017–18 game log

October: 6–3–2 (Home: 2–2–2; Road: 4–1–0)
#	Date	Visitor	Score	Home	OT	Decision	Attendance	Record	Pts	Recap
1	October 7	Edmonton	2–3	Vancouver		Markstrom	18,865	1–0–0	2	Recap
2	October 10	Ottawa	3–2	Vancouver	SO	Markstrom	17,273	1–0–1	3	Recap
3	October 12	Winnipeg	4–2	Vancouver		Markstrom	15,589	1–1–1	3	Recap
4	October 14	Calgary	5–2	Vancouver		Markstrom	17,074	1–2–1	3	Recap
5	October 17	Vancouver	3–0	Ottawa		Nilsson	13,430	2–2–1	5	Recap
6	October 19	Vancouver	3–6	Boston		Nilsson	17,565	2–3–1	5	Recap
7	October 20	Vancouver	4–2	Buffalo		Markstrom	18,050	3–3–1	7	Recap
8	October 22	Vancouver	4–1	Detroit		Markstrom	19,515	4–3–1	9	Recap
9	October 24	Vancouver	1–0	Minnesota		Nilsson	18,694	5–3–1	11	Recap
10	October 26	Washington	2–6	Vancouver		Nilsson	18,293	6–3–1	13	Recap
11	October 30	Dallas	2–1	Vancouver	OT	Markstrom	17,109	6–3–2	14	Recap

November: 6–7–2 (Home: 1–3–1; Road: 5–4–1)
#	Date	Visitor	Score	Home	OT	Decision	Attendance	Record	Pts	Recap
12	November 1	New Jersey	2–0	Vancouver		Markstrom	16,855	6–4–2	14	Recap
13	November 4	Pittsburgh	2–4	Vancouver		Markstrom	18,865	7–4–2	16	Recap
14	November 6	Detroit	3–2	Vancouver		Markstrom	17,836	7–5–2	16	Recap
15	November 7	Vancouver	5–3	Calgary		Markstrom	18,160	8–5–2	18	Recap
16	November 9	Vancouver	1–4	Anaheim		Markstrom	16,038	8–6–2	18	Recap
17	November 11	Vancouver	0–5	San Jose		Markstrom	17,562	8–7–2	18	Recap
18	November 14	Vancouver	3–2	Los Angeles		Nilsson	18,230	9–7–2	20	Recap
19	November 16	Vegas	5–2	Vancouver		Markstrom	18,119	9–8–2	20	Recap
20	November 18	St. Louis	4–3	Vancouver	OT	Nilsson	18,865	9–8–3	21	Recap
21	November 21	Vancouver	5–2	Philadelphia		Markstrom	19,278	10–8–3	23	Recap
22	November 22	Vancouver	5–2	Pittsburgh		Nilsson	18,606	11–8–3	25	Recap
23	November 24	Vancouver	2–3	New Jersey		Markstrom	16,514	11–9–3	25	Recap
24	November 26	Vancouver	3–4	NY Rangers	SO	Markstrom	17,632	11–9–4	26	Recap
25	November 28	Vancouver	2–5	NY Islanders		Nilsson	11,194	11–10–4	26	Recap
26	November 30	Vancouver	5–3	Nashville		Nilsson	17,113	12–10–4	28	Recap

December: 4–8–1 (Home: 4–6–0; Road: 0–2–1)
#	Date	Visitor	Score	Home	OT	Decision	Attendance	Record	Pts	Recap
27	December 2	Toronto	1–2	Vancouver		Markstrom	18,865	13–10–4	30	Recap
28	December 5	Carolina	0–3	Vancouver		Markstrom	17,860	14–10–4	32	Recap
29	December 7	Philadelphia	4–1	Vancouver		Markstrom	16,515	14–11–4	32	Recap
30	December 9	Vancouver	2–4	Calgary		Nilsson	18,552	14–12–4	32	Recap
31	December 11	Vancouver	1–5	Winnipeg		Markstrom	15,321	14–13–4	32	Recap
32	December 13	Nashville	7–1	Vancouver		Nilsson	16,806	14–14–4	32	Recap
33	December 15	San Jose	3–4	Vancouver	OT	Markstrom	17,278	15–14–4	34	Recap
34	December 17	Calgary	6–1	Vancouver		Markstrom	18,236	15–15–4	34	Recap
35	December 19	Montreal	7–5	Vancouver		Nilsson	18,865	15–16–4	34	Recap
36	December 21	Vancouver	4–5	San Jose	OT	Markstrom	17,562	15–16–5	35	Recap
37	December 23	St. Louis	3–1	Vancouver		Markstrom	17,919	15–17–5	35	Recap
38	December 28	Chicago	2–5	Vancouver		Markstrom	18,865	16–17–5	37	Recap
39	December 30	Los Angeles	4–3	Vancouver		Markstrom	18,865	16–18–5	37	Recap

January: 4–6–1 (Home: 2–2–0; Road: 2–4–1)
#	Date	Visitor	Score	Home	OT	Decision	Attendance	Record	Pts	Recap
40	January 2	Anaheim	5–0	Vancouver		Nilsson	18,865	16–19–5	37	Recap
41	January 6	Vancouver	2–3	Toronto	SO	Markstrom	19,361	16–19–6	38	Recap
42	January 7	Vancouver	2–5	Montreal		Nilsson	21,302	16–20–6	38	Recap
43	January 9	Vancouver	1–3	Washington		Markstrom	18,506	16–21–6	38	Recap
44	January 12	Vancouver	5–2	Columbus		Markstrom	16,705	17–21–6	40	Recap
45	January 14	Vancouver	3–2	Minnesota	OT	Markstrom	18,927	18–21–6	42	Recap
46	January 20	Vancouver	2–5	Edmonton		Markstrom	18,347	18–22–6	42	Recap
47	January 21	Vancouver	0–1	Winnipeg		Nilsson	15,321	18–23–6	42	Recap
48	January 23	Los Angeles	2–6	Vancouver		Markstrom	18,865	19–23–6	44	Recap
49	January 25	Buffalo	4–0	Vancouver		Markstrom	18,340	19–24–6	44	Recap
50	January 30	Colorado	3–4	Vancouver	OT	Markstrom	18,257	20–24–6	46	Recap

February: 4–8–2 (Home: 2–2–2; Road: 2–6–0)
#	Date	Visitor	Score	Home	OT	Decision	Attendance	Record	Pts	Recap
51	February 1	Chicago	2–4	Vancouver		Markstrom	18,144	21–24–6	48	Recap
52	February 3	Tampa Bay	4–2	Vancouver		Markstrom	18,865	21–25–6	48	Recap
53	February 6	Vancouver	1–3	Florida		Markstrom	10,758	21–26–6	48	Recap
54	February 8	Vancouver	2–5	Tampa Bay		Nilsson	19,092	21–27–6	48	Recap
55	February 9	Vancouver	1–4	Carolina		Markstrom	13,123	21–28–6	48	Recap
56	February 11	Vancouver	6–0	Dallas		Markstrom	17,889	22–28–6	50	Recap
57	February 14	Florida	4–3	Vancouver		Markstrom	17,412	22–29–6	50	Recap
58	February 15	Vancouver	1–4	San Jose		Nilsson	17,274	22–30–6	50	Recap
59	February 17	Boston	1–6	Vancouver		Nilsson	18,865	23–30–6	52	Recap
60	February 20	Colorado	5–4	Vancouver	OT	Nilsson	18,107	23–30–7	53	Recap
61	February 23	Vancouver	3–6	Vegas		Nilsson	18,207	23–31–7	53	Recap
62	February 25	Vancouver	3–1	Arizona		Markstrom	10,935	24–31–7	55	Recap
63	February 26	Vancouver	1–3	Colorado		Markstrom	12,654	24–32–7	55	Recap
64	February 28	NY Rangers	6–5	Vancouver	OT	Nilsson	18,044	24–32–8	56	Recap

March: 6–8–1 (Home: 4–3–1; Road: 2–5–0)
#	Date	Visitor	Score	Home	OT	Decision	Attendance	Record	Pts	Recap
65	March 2	Nashville	4–3	Vancouver	OT	Markstrom	18,470	24–32–9	57	Recap
66	March 5	NY Islanders	3–4	Vancouver	OT	Markstrom	17,307	25–32–9	59	Recap
67	March 7	Arizona	2–1	Vancouver		Markstrom	17,742	25–33–9	59	Recap
68	March 9	Minnesota	5–2	Vancouver		Nilsson	17,918	25–34–9	59	Recap
69	March 11	Vancouver	0–1	Arizona		Markstrom	11,697	25–35–9	59	Recap
70	March 12	Vancouver	0–3	Los Angeles		Nilsson	18,230	25–36–9	59	Recap
71	March 14	Vancouver	0–3	Anaheim		Markstrom	16,561	25–37–9	59	Recap
72	March 17	San Jose	5–3	Vancouver		Markstrom	18,332	25–38–9	59	Recap
73	March 20	Vancouver	1–4	Vegas		Markstrom	18,214	25–39–9	59	Recap
74	March 22	Vancouver	5–2	Chicago		Markstrom	21,526	26–39–9	61	Recap
75	March 23	Vancouver	1–4	St. Louis		Nilsson	17,724	26–40–9	61	Recap
76	March 25	Vancouver	4–1	Dallas		Markstrom	18,112	27–40–9	63	Recap
77	March 27	Anaheim	1–4	Vancouver		Markstrom	18,405	28–40–9	65	Recap
78	March 29	Edmonton	1–2	Vancouver		Markstrom	17,883	29–40–9	67	Recap
79	March 31	Columbus	4–5	Vancouver	OT	Demko	18,865	30–40–9	69	Recap

April: 1–0–2 (Home: 1–0–1; Road: 0–0–1)
#	Date	Visitor	Score	Home	OT	Decision	Attendance	Record	Pts	Recap
80	April 3	Vegas	5–4	Vancouver	SO	Markstrom	18,865	30–40–10	70	Recap
81	April 5	Arizona	3–4	Vancouver	OT	Markstrom	18,865	31–40–10	72	Recap
82	April 7	Vancouver	2–3	Edmonton	SO	Nilsson	18,347	31–40–11	73	Recap

Legend: Win (2 points) Loss (0 points) Overtime/shootout loss (1 point)

=== Detailed records ===
Western Conference
Central Division
Opponent	Home	Away	Total	Pts.	Goals scored	Goals allowed
Chicago Blackhawks	2–0–0	1–0–0	3–0–0	6	14	6
Colorado Avalanche	1–0–1	0–1–0	1–1–1	3	9	11
Dallas Stars	0–0–1	2–0–0	2–0–1	5	11	3
Minnesota Wild	0–1–0	2–0–0	2–1–0	4	6	7
Nashville Predators	0–1–1	1–0–0	1–1–1	3	9	14
St. Louis Blues	0–1–1	0–1–0	0–2–1	2	5	11
Winnipeg Jets	0–1–0	0–2–0	0–3–0	0	3	10
Total	3–3–4	6–4–0	9–7–4	22	56	59
Pacific Division
Opponent	Home	Away	Total	Pts.	Goals scored	Goals allowed
Anaheim Ducks	1–1–0	0–2–0	1–3–0	2	5	13
Arizona Coyotes	1–1–0	1–1–0	2–2–0	4	8	7
Calgary Flames	0–2–0	1–1–0	1–3–0	2	10	18
Edmonton Oilers	2–0–0	0–1–1	2–1–1	5	9	11
Los Angeles Kings	1–1–0	1–1–0	2–2–0	4	12	11
San Jose Sharks	1–1–0	0–2–1	1–3–1	3	12	22
Vegas Golden Knights	0–1–1	0–2–0	0–3–1	1	10	20
Vancouver Canucks	—	—	—	—	—	—
Total	6–7–1	3–10–2	9–17–3	21	66	102

Eastern Conference
Atlantic Division
Opponent	Home	Away	Total	Pts.	Goals scored	Goals allowed
Boston Bruins	1–0–0	0–1–0	1–1–0	2	9	7
Buffalo Sabres	0–1–0	1–0–0	1–1–0	2	4	6
Detroit Red Wings	0–1–0	1–0–0	1–1–0	2	6	4
Florida Panthers	0–1–0	0–1–0	0–2–0	0	4	7
Montreal Canadiens	0–1–0	0–1–0	0–2–0	0	7	12
Ottawa Senators	0–0–1	1–0–0	1–0–1	3	5	3
Tampa Bay Lightning	0–1–0	0–1–0	0–2–0	0	4	9
Toronto Maple Leafs	1–0–0	0–0–1	1–0–1	3	4	4
Total	2–5–1	3–4–1	5–8–2	12	43	48
Metropolitan Division
Opponent	Home	Away	Total	Pts.	Goals scored	Goals allowed
Carolina Hurricanes	1–0–0	0–1–0	1–1–0	2	4	4
Columbus Blue Jackets	1–0–0	1–0–0	2–0–0	4	10	6
New Jersey Devils	0–1–0	0–1–0	0–2–0	0	2	5
New York Islanders	1–0–0	0–1–0	1–1–0	2	6	8
New York Rangers	0–0–1	0–0–1	0–0–2	2	8	10
Philadelphia Flyers	0–1–0	1–0–0	1–1–0	2	6	6
Pittsburgh Penguins	1–0–0	1–0–0	2–0–0	4	9	4
Washington Capitals	1–0–0	0–1–0	1–1–0	2	7	5
Total	5–2–1	3–4–1	8–6–2	18	52	48

== Player statistics ==
Final stats

=== Skaters ===
Regular season
Player	GP	G	A	Pts	+/−	PIM
Brock Boeser	62	29	26	55	−5	16
Daniel Sedin	81	23	32	55	−21	40
Henrik Sedin	82	3	47	50	−22	30
Bo Horvat	64	22	22	44	−1	10
Thomas Vanek^{‡}	61	17	24	41	−12	28
Alexander Edler	70	6	28	34	−18	68
Sam Gagner	74	10	21	31	−18	31
Sven Bartschi	53	14	15	29	3	20
Brandon Sutter	61	11	15	26	8	8
Loui Eriksson	50	10	13	23	0	4
Michael Del Zotto	82	6	16	22	−8	48
Derrick Pouliot	71	3	19	22	−22	39
Jake Virtanen	75	10	10	20	−11	46
Nikolay Goldobin	38	8	6	14	−14	6
Markus Granlund	53	8	4	12	−10	8
Christopher Tanev	42	2	9	11	7	8
Troy Stecher	68	1	10	11	−7	35
Jussi Jokinen^{†}	14	4	6	10	7	2
Derek Dorsett	20	7	2	9	−1	74
Darren Archibald	27	4	5	9	−1	14
Brendan Leipsic^{†}	14	3	6	9	−3	10
Alex Biega	43	1	8	9	3	32
Brendan Gaunce	37	4	2	6	0	10
Alexander Burmistrov	24	2	4	6	−5	12
Ben Hutton	61	0	6	6	−9	23
Reid Boucher	20	3	2	5	−12	0
Erik Gudbranson	52	2	3	5	−7	35
Nic Dowd^{†}	40	3	0	3	−7	16
Tyler Motte^{†}	15	2	0	2	−1	4
Ashton Sautner	5	0	2	2	4	2
Jayson Megna	1	0	0	0	0	0
Philip Holm^{‡}	1	0	0	0	−2	0
Adam Gaudette	5	0	0	0	0	0
Michael Chaput	9	0	0	0	−4	5

=== Goaltenders ===
Regular season
Player	GP	GS	TOI	W	L	OT	GA	GAA	SA	SV%	SO	G	A	PIM
Jacob Markstrom	60	57	3,413:43	23	26	7	154	2.71	1,745	.912	2	0	3	4
Anders Nilsson	27	24	1,463:41	7	14	4	84	3.44	850	.901	2	0	1	0
Thatcher Demko	1	1	61:21	1	0	0	4	3.91	30	.867	0	0	0	0

^{†}Acquired by Canucks mid-season. Statistics reflect time with Canucks only.
^{‡}Denotes player was traded mid-season. Statistics reflect time with the Canucks only.

== Awards and honours ==
=== Awards ===
Regular season
Player	Award	Awarded	Ref
Brock Boeser	NHL Rookie of the Month for November	December 1, 2017	
Brock Boeser	NHL Rookie of the Month for December	January 2, 2018	
Brock Boeser	NHL All-Star game selection	January 10, 2018	

=== Milestones ===
Regular season
Player	Milestone	Reached	Ref
Brandon Sutter	600th career NHL game	October 14, 2017	
Sam Gagner	700th career NHL game	October 14, 2017	
Jacob Markstrom	100th career NHL start	October 14, 2017	
Derek Dorsett	500th career NHL game	October 17, 2017	
Thomas Vanek	700th career NHL point	October 17, 2017	
Sven Bartschi	100th career NHL point	October 26, 2017	
Alexander Burmistrov	100th career NHL point	October 26, 2017	
Alex Biega	100th career NHL game	November 4, 2017	
Brock Boeser	1st career NHL hat-trick	November 4, 2017	
Thomas Vanek	900th career NHL game	November 7, 2017	
Michael Del Zotto	500th career NHL game	November 9, 2017	
Loui Eriksson	800th career NHL game	November 22, 2017	
Alexander Edler	700th career NHL game	November 26, 2017	
Daniel Sedin	1000th career NHL point	November 30, 2017	
Jacob Markstrom	1st career NHL shutout	December 5, 2017	
Markus Granlund	200th career NHL game	December 9, 2017	
Michael Del Zotto	200th career NHL point	December 9, 2017	
Henrik Sedin	800th career NHL assist	December 13, 2017	
Derrick Pouliot	100th career NHL game	December 21, 2017	
Nic Dowd	100th career NHL game	December 30, 2017	
Brendan Gaunce	100th career NHL game	December 30, 2017	
Jake Virtanen	100th career NHL game	December 30, 2017	
Troy Stecher	100th career NHL game	January 9, 2018	
Henrik Sedin	1300th career NHL game	February 3, 2018	
Anders Nilsson	100th career NHL game	February 23, 2018	
Ben Hutton	200th career NHL game	March 2, 2018	
Daniel Sedin	1300th career NHL game	March 25, 2018	
Ashton Sautner	1st career NHL game	March 25, 2018	
Adam Gaudette	1st career NHL game	March 29, 2018	
Thatcher Demko	1st career NHL game 1st career NHL win	March 31, 2018	
Ashton Sautner	1st career NHL assist 1st career NHL point	March 31, 2018	

=== Records ===
Player	Record	Date
Alexander Edler	Most points by Canucks defenceman	March 2, 2018

== Suspensions/fines ==
Player	Explanation	Length	Salary	Date issued
Erik Gudbranson	Boarding Boston forward Frank Vatrano	1 game	$18,817.20	October 20, 2017

== Transactions ==
The Canucks have been involved in the following transactions during the 2017–18 season.

=== Trades ===
Date	Details		Ref
October 3, 2017	To Vancouver Canucks Derrick Pouliot	To Pittsburgh Penguins Andrey Pedan; 4th-round pick in 2018
December 7, 2017	To Vancouver Canucks Nic Dowd	To Los Angeles Kings Jordan Subban
February 26, 2018	To Vancouver Canucks Brendan Leipsic	To Vegas Golden Knights Philip Holm
February 26, 2018	To Vancouver Canucks Jussi Jokinen; Tyler Motte	To Columbus Blue Jackets Thomas Vanek

=== Free agents acquired ===
Date	Player	Former team	Contract terms (in U.S. dollars)	Ref
Sam Gagner	July 1, 2017	Columbus Blue Jackets	3-year, $9.45 million	
Michael Del Zotto	July 1, 2017	Philadelphia Flyers	2-year, $6 million	
Patrick Wiercioch	July 1, 2017	Colorado Avalanche	1-year, $650,000	
Alexander Burmistrov	July 1, 2017	Arizona Coyotes	1-year, $900,000	
Anders Nilsson	July 1, 2017	Buffalo Sabres	2-year, $5 million	
Thomas Vanek	September 1, 2017	Florida Panthers	1-year, $2 million	

=== Free agents lost ===
Date	Player	New team	Contract terms (in U.S. dollars)	Ref
Chad Billins	April 19, 2017	Linkopings HC	2-year	
Tom Nilsson	May 2, 2017	Djurgårdens IF	2-year	
Ryan Miller	July 1, 2017	Anaheim Ducks	2-year, $4 million	
Alexandre Grenier	July 2, 2017	Florida Panthers	1-year, $725,000	
Mike Zalewski	July 17, 2017	Straubing Tigers	1-year	
Borna Rendulic	August 11, 2017	Lahti Pelicans	1-year	
Michael Garteig	August 24, 2017	Utica Comets	1-year	
Jack Skille	September 7, 2017	Dinamo Minsk	Unknown	
Joseph Cramarossa	September 28, 2017	Stockton Heat	Unknown	
Alexander Burmistrov	December 27, 2017	Ak Bars Kazan	1-year	

=== Claimed via waivers ===
Player	Previous team	Date	Ref

=== Lost via waivers ===
Player	New team	Date	Ref

=== Players released ===
Date	Player	Via	Ref
November 20, 2017	Anton Rodin	Mutual agreement	

=== Lost via retirement ===
Date	Player	Ref
November 30, 2017	Derek Dorsett	
December 24, 2017	Alexander Burmistrov	

=== Player signings ===
Date	Player	Contract terms (in U.S. dollars)	Ref
July 1, 2017	Anton Rodin	1-year, $700,000	
July 7, 2017	Joseph LaBate	1-year, $650,000	
July 12, 2017	Evan McEneny	2-year, $1.315 million	
July 13, 2017	Michael Chaput	1-year, $687,500	
July 24, 2017	Reid Boucher	2-year, $1.315 million	
August 9, 2017	Brendan Gaunce	2-year, $1.5 million	
September 8, 2017	Bo Horvat	6-year, $33 million	
October 16, 2017	Jonah Gadjovich	3-year, $2.775 million entry-level contract	
February 20, 2018	Erik Gudbranson	3-year, $12 million contract extension	
February 28, 2018	Alex Biega	2-year, $1.65 million contract extension	
March 1, 2018	Kole Lind	3-year, $3.375 million entry-level contract	
March 8, 2018	Ashton Sautner	2-year, $1.35 million contract extension	
March 26, 2018	Adam Gaudette	3-year, $4.475 million entry-level contract	
April 20, 2018	Lukas Jasek	3-year, $2.775 million entry-level contract	
May 25, 2018	Elias Pettersson	3-year, $11.325 million entry-level contract	
May 28, 2018	Petrus Palmu	2-year, $2.775 million entry-level contract	
May 31, 2018	Michael DiPietro	3-year, $2.775 million entry-level contract	
June 19, 2018	Reid Boucher	1-year, $725,000 contract extension	
June 20, 2018	Richard Bachman	2-year, $1.35 million contract extension	

== Draft picks ==
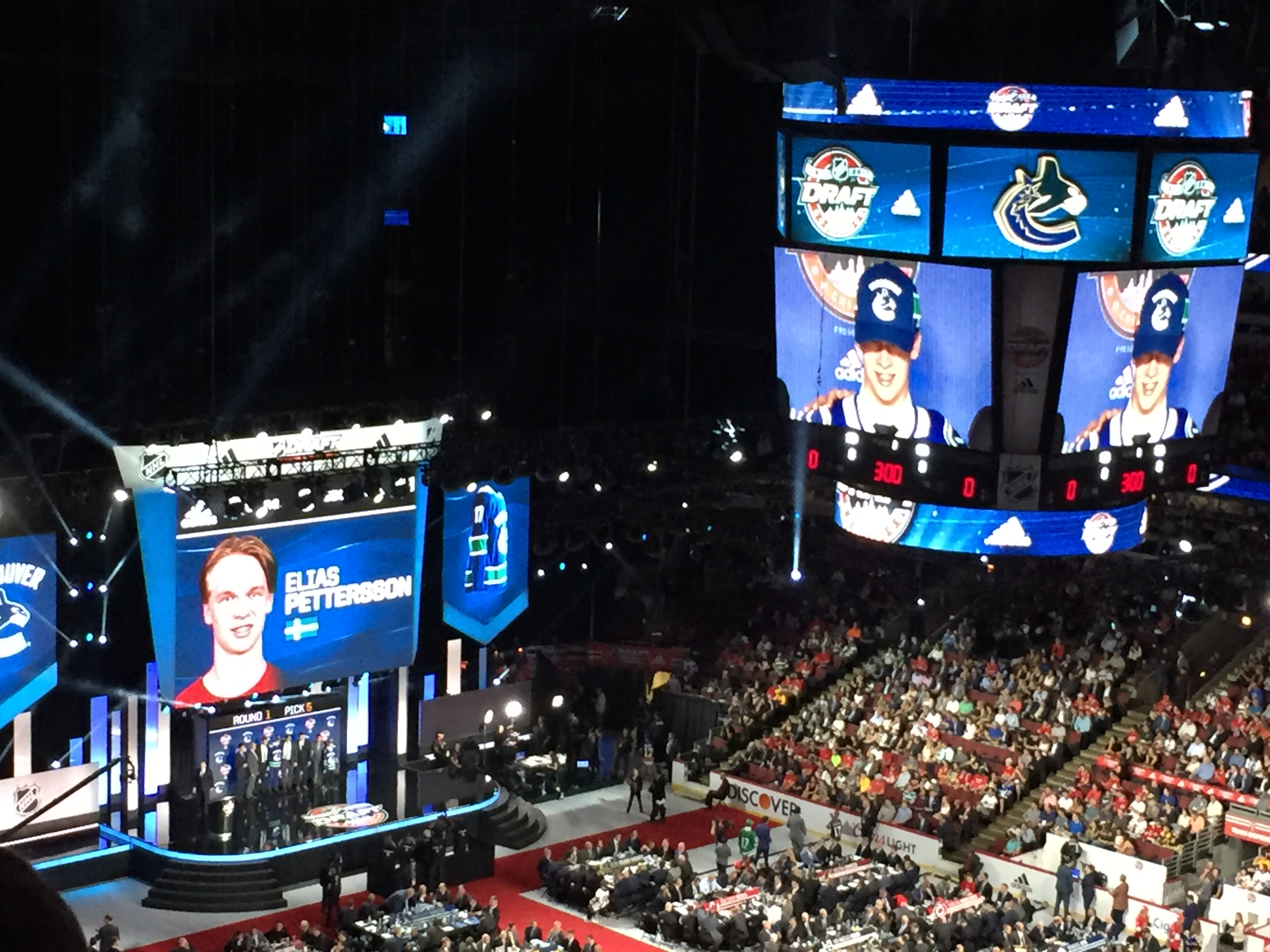
The Vancouver Canucks selected Elias Pettersson at 5th overall in the 2017 NHL entry draft.

Below are the Vancouver Canucks' selections at the 2017 NHL entry draft, which was held on June 23 and 24, 2017 at the United Center in Chicago.

Round	#	Player	Pos	Nationality	College/Junior/Club team (League)
1	5	Elias Pettersson	C	Sweden	Timra IK (Allsvenskan)
2	33	Kole Lind	RW	Canada	Kelowna Rockets (WHL)
2	55^{1}	Jonah Gadjovich	LW	Canada	Owen Sound Attack (OHL)
3	64	Michael DiPietro	G	Canada	Windsor Spitfires (OHL)
4	95	Jack Rathbone	D	United States	Dexter School (USHS)
5	135^{2}	Kristoffer Gunnarsson	D	Sweden	IK Oskarshamn (Allsvenskan)
6	181^{3}	Petrus Palmu	LW	Finland	Owen Sound Attack (OHL)
7	188	Matt Brassard	D	Canada	Oshawa Generals (OHL)

Draft notes

1. The Columbus Blue Jackets' second-round pick went to the Vancouver Canucks as compensation for Columbus hiring John Tortorella as their head coach on October 21, 2015.
2. The Carolina Hurricanes' fifth-round pick went to the Vancouver Canucks as the result of a trade on June 24, 2017, that sent San Jose's fourth-round pick in 2017 (112th overall) to Chicago in exchange for a sixth-round pick in 2017 (181st overall) and this pick.
3. The Chicago Blackhawks' sixth-round pick went to the Vancouver Canucks as the result of a trade on June 24, 2017, that sent San Jose's fourth-round pick in 2017 (112th overall) to Chicago in exchange for Carolina's fifth-round pick in 2017 (135th overall) and this pick.
