= 2017–18 Philadelphia Flyers season =

Ice hockey season for team in league

2017–18 Philadelphia Flyers
- Division: 3rd Metropolitan
- Conference: 6th Eastern
- 2017–18 record: 42–26–14
- Home record: 22–13–6
- Road record: 20–13–8
- Goals for: 251
- Goals against: 243

Team information
- General manager: Ron Hextall
- Coach: Dave Hakstol
- Captain: Claude Giroux
- Alternate captains: Valtteri Filppula (Note: The second alternate captain was Filppula for home games and MacDonald for road games.); Andrew MacDonald; Wayne Simmonds
- Arena: Wells Fargo Center
- Average attendance: 19,517
- Minor league affiliates: Lehigh Valley Phantoms (AHL); Reading Royals (ECHL)

Team leaders
- Goals: Claude Giroux (34)
- Assists: Claude Giroux (68)
- Points: Claude Giroux (102)
- Penalty minutes: Radko Gudas (83)
- Plus/minus: Sean Couturier (+34)
- Wins: Brian Elliott (23)
- Goals against average: Michal Neuvirth (2.60)

The 2017–18 Philadelphia Flyers season was the 51st season for the National Hockey League (NHL) franchise that was established on June 5, 1967. They would improve from their record from last year and make the playoffs for the first time since the 2015–16 season.

== Off-season ==
The first major event of the off-season was the 2017 NHL expansion draft with general manager Ron Hextall having to submit his list of protected players for the draft. The Vegas Golden Knights selected Pierre-Edouard Bellemare at number 12 from the Flyers.

Having been awarded the second overall pick in the 2017 NHL entry draft in the draft lottery, Hextall made several trades in the lead-up to draft day. The most significant of them being to trade Brayden Schenn to the St. Louis Blues in exchange for the 27th overall pick in the draft, a conditional first round pick in 2018, and Jori Lehtera. The Flyers selected forward Nolan Patrick with the second overall pick, and went on to add Morgan Frost with the pick acquired from St. Louis and Isaac Ratcliffe with their second round selection, to add to their forward prospects.

The Flyers remained fairly quiet players in free agency, as had been the case the previous year. The main issue for Hextall being to decide how to fill the vacancy left in net by Steve Mason. On July 1, 2017 the Flyers announced the signing of free agent Brian Elliott who would join the recently extended Michal Neuvirth to make up the goalie tandem. The Flyers also re-signed several players including Scott Laughton, Taylor Leier, Jordan Weal and Shayne Gostisbehere.

== Regular season ==
Defenseman Radko Gudas received a ten-game suspension for slashing Winnipeg Jets forward Mathieu Perreault on November 16, which was tied for the longest suspension handed out during the 2017–18 season.

=== Standings ===
Metropolitan Division
Pos	Team	GP	W	L	OTL	ROW	GF	GA	GD	Pts
1	y – Washington Capitals	82	49	26	7	46	259	239	+20	105
2	x – Pittsburgh Penguins	82	47	29	6	45	272	250	+22	100
3	x – Philadelphia Flyers	82	42	26	14	40	251	243	+8	98
4	x – Columbus Blue Jackets	82	45	30	7	39	242	230	+12	97
5	x – New Jersey Devils	82	44	29	9	39	248	244	+4	97
6	Carolina Hurricanes	82	36	35	11	33	228	256	−28	83
7	New York Islanders	82	35	37	10	32	264	296	−32	80
8	New York Rangers	82	34	39	9	31	231	268	−37	77

Source: National Hockey League
x – Clinched playoff spot; y – Clinched division

== Schedule and results ==
=== Preseason ===
The preseason schedule was published on June 15, 2017.

2017 preseason
Preseason: 3–2–3 (home: 3–1–0; road: 0–1–3

Game	Date	Visitor	Score	Home	OT	Decision	Attendance	Record	Recap
1	September 17	Philadelphia	2–3	NY Islanders^{[b]}	OT	Lyon	–	0–0–1	OTL
2^{[a]}	September 20	NY Islanders	2–3	Philadelphia^{[c]}	OT	Irving	–	1–0–1	W
3^{[a]}	September 20	Philadelphia	2–3	NY Islanders		Lyon	5,042	1–1–1	L
4	September 21	Philadelphia	1–2	Boston	OT	Lyon	16,781	1–1–2	OTL
5	September 25	Philadelphia	2–3	NY Rangers	OT	Neuvirth	14,037	1–1–3	OTL
6	September 26	NY Rangers	3–4	Philadelphia	OT	Elliott	18,266	2–1–3	W
7	September 28	Boston	1–5	Philadelphia		Lyon	18,572	3–1–3	W
8	October 1	NY Islanders	5–2	Philadelphia		Elliott	18,575	3–2–3	L
Notes:^{a} – Indicates split-squad game.^{b} – Game was played at Nassau Veterans Memorial Coliseum in Uniondale, New York.^{c} – Game was played at PPL Center in Allentown, Pennsylvania.

Legend: W Win (2 points) L Loss (0 points) OTL Overtime/shootout loss (1 point)

=== Regular season ===
The regular season schedule was released on June 22, 2017.

2017–18 regular season
October: 6–5–1 (home: 3–2–1; road: 3–3–0)

Game	Date	Visitor	Score	Home	OT	Decision	Attendance	Record	Points	Recap
1	October 4	Philadelphia	5–3	San Jose		Elliott	17,562	1–0–0	2	W
2	October 5	Philadelphia	0–2	Los Angeles		Neuvirth	18,230	1–1–0	2	L
3	October 7	Philadelphia	3–2	Anaheim	OT	Elliott	16,032	2–1–0	4	W
4	October 10	Philadelphia	5–6	Nashville		Elliott	17,194	2–2–0	4	L
5	October 14	Washington	2–8	Philadelphia		Elliott	19,817	3–2–0	6	W
6	October 17	Florida	1–5	Philadelphia		Neuvirth	19,145	4–2–0	8	W
7	October 19	Nashville	1–0	Philadelphia		Neuvirth	19,396	4–3–0	8	L
8	October 21	Edmonton	1–2	Philadelphia		Elliott	19,510	5–3–0	10	W
9	October 24	Anaheim	6–2	Philadelphia		Elliott	18,895	5–4–0	10	L
10	October 26	Philadelphia	4–5	Ottawa		Neuvirth	14,926	5–5–0	10	L
11	October 28	Philadelphia	4–2	Toronto		Elliott	19,317	6–5–0	12	W
12	October 30	Arizona	4–3	Philadelphia	OT	Elliott	18,731	6–5–1	13	OTL

November: 2–5–6 (home: 1–3–3; road: 1–2–3)

Game	Date	Visitor	Score	Home	OT	Decision	Attendance	Record	Points	Recap
13	November 1	Philadelphia	0–3	Chicago		Elliott	21,524	6–6–1	13	L
14	November 2	Philadelphia	2–0	St. Louis		Neuvirth	17,162	7–6–1	15	W
15	November 4	Colorado	5–4	Philadelphia	SO	Neuvirth	19,616	7–6–2	16	OTL
16	November 9	Chicago	1–3	Philadelphia		Elliott	19,738	8–6–2	18	W
17	November 11	Minnesota	1–0	Philadelphia		Elliott	19,309	8–7–2	18	L
18	November 14	Philadelphia	0–3	Minnesota		Elliott	18,768	8–8–2	18	L
19	November 16	Philadelphia	2–3	Winnipeg	SO	Elliott	15,321	8–8–3	19	OTL
20	November 18	Calgary	5–4	Philadelphia	OT	Elliott	19,210	8–8–4	20	OTL
21	November 21	Vancouver	5–2	Philadelphia		Neuvirth	19,278	8–9–4	20	L
22	November 22	Philadelphia	3–4	NY Islanders	OT	Elliott	12,462	8–9–5	21	OTL
23	November 24	NY Islanders	5–4	Philadelphia	OT	Elliott	19,643	8–9–6	22	OTL
24	November 27	Philadelphia	4–5	Pittsburgh	OT	Elliott	18,505	8–9–7	23	OTL
25	November 28	San Jose	3–1	Philadelphia		Neuvirth	18,935	8–10–7	23	L

December: 8–4–1 (home: 4–2–0; road: 4–2–1)

Game	Date	Visitor	Score	Home	OT	Decision	Attendance	Record	Points	Recap
26	December 2	Boston	3–0	Philadelphia		Elliott	19,274	8–11–7	23	L
27	December 4	Philadelphia	5–2	Calgary		Elliott	18,590	9–11–7	25	W
28	December 6	Philadelphia	4–2	Edmonton		Elliott	18,347	10–11–7	27	W
29	December 7	Philadelphia	4–1	Vancouver		Elliott	16,515	11–11–7	29	W
30	December 12	Toronto	2–4	Philadelphia		Elliott	19,077	12–11–7	31	W
31	December 14	Buffalo	1–2	Philadelphia		Elliott	19,508	13–11–7	33	W
32	December 16	Dallas	1–2	Philadelphia	OT	Elliott	19,477	14–11–7	35	W
33	December 18	Los Angeles	4–1	Philadelphia		Elliott	19,617	14–12–7	35	L
34	December 20	Detroit	3–4	Philadelphia		Elliott	19,674	15–12–7	37	W
35	December 22	Philadelphia	2–4	Buffalo		Elliott	18,222	15–13–7	37	L
36	December 23	Philadelphia	1–2	Columbus	SO	Elliott	17,812	15–13–8	38	OTL
37	December 28	Philadelphia	2–3	Florida		Elliott	17,083	15–14–8	38	L
38	December 29	Philadelphia	5–3	Tampa Bay		Elliott	19,092	16–14–8	40	W

January: 8–4–0 (home: 5–2–0; road: 3–2–0)

Game	Date	Visitor	Score	Home	OT	Decision	Attendance	Record	Points	Recap
39	January 2	Pittsburgh	5–1	Philadelphia		Elliott	19,558	16–15–8	40	L
40	January 4	NY Islanders	4–6	Philadelphia		Elliott	19,358	17–15–8	42	W
41	January 6	St. Louis	3–6	Philadelphia		Elliott	19,665	18–15–8	44	W
42	January 7	Buffalo	1–4	Philadelphia		Neuvirth	19,662	19–15–8	46	W
43	January 13	Philadelphia	5–3	New Jersey		Elliott	16,514	20–15–8	48	W
44	January 16	Philadelphia	1–5	NY Rangers		Elliott	18,006	20–16–8	48	L
45	January 18	Toronto	2–3	Philadelphia	OT	Neuvirth	19,860	21–16–8	50	W
46	January 20	New Jersey	1–3	Philadelphia		Neuvirth	19,934	22–16–8	52	W
47	January 21	Philadelphia	2–1	Washington	OT	Elliott	18,506	23–16–8	54	W
48	January 23	Philadelphia	3–2	Detroit	OT	Elliott	19,515	24–16–8	56	W
49	January 25	Tampa Bay	5–1	Philadelphia		Neuvirth	19,489	24–17–8	56	L
50	January 31	Philadelphia	3–5	Washington		Neuvirth	18,506	24–18–8	56	L

February: 10–1–2 (home: 3–0–2; road: 7–1–0)

Game	Date	Visitor	Score	Home	OT	Decision	Attendance	Record	Points	Recap
51	February 1	Philadelphia	3–4	New Jersey		Lyon	13,906	24–19–8	56	L
52	February 3	Ottawa	4–3	Philadelphia	SO	Neuvirth	19,729	24–19–9	57	OTL
53	February 6	Philadelphia	2–1	Carolina	OT	Elliott	11,585	25–19–9	59	W
54	February 8	Montreal	3–5	Philadelphia		Elliott	19,655	26–19–9	61	W
55	February 10	Philadelphia	4–3	Arizona	SO	Neuvirth	13,004	27–19–9	63	W
56	February 11	Philadelphia	4–1	Vegas		Neuvirth	18,220	28–19–9	65	W
57	February 13	New Jersey	5–4	Philadelphia	SO	Neuvirth	19,312	28–19–10	66	OTL
58	February 16	Philadelphia	2–1	Columbus	OT	Neuvirth	17,364	29–19–10	68	W
59	February 18	Philadelphia	7–4	NY Rangers		Lyon	18,006	30–19–10	70	W
60	February 20	Montreal	2–3	Philadelphia	OT	Lyon	19,336	31–19–10	72	W
61	February 22	Columbus	1–2	Philadelphia		Mrazek	19,727	32–19–10	74	W
62	February 24	Philadelphia	5–3	Ottawa		Mrazek	16,128	33–19–10	76	W
63	February 26	Philadelphia	1–0	Montreal	SO	Mrazek	21,302	34–19–10	78	W

March: 5–6–4 (home: 3–4–0; road: 2–2–4)

Game	Date	Visitor	Score	Home	OT	Decision	Attendance	Record	Points	Recap
64	March 1	Carolina	4–1	Philadelphia		Mrazek	19,245	34–20–10	78	L
65	March 3	Philadelphia	6–7	Tampa Bay	SO	Mrazek	19,092	34–20–11	79	OTL
66	March 4	Philadelphia	1–4	Florida		Mrazek	14,428	34–21–11	79	L
67	March 7	Pittsburgh	5–2	Philadelphia		Mrazek	19,624	34–22–11	79	L
68	March 8	Philadelphia	2–3	Boston		Lyon	17,565	34–23–11	79	L
69	March 10	Winnipeg	1–2	Philadelphia		Mrazek	19,929	35–23–11	81	W
70	March 12	Vegas	3–2	Philadelphia		Mrazek	19,723	35–24–11	81	L
71	March 15	Columbus	5–3	Philadelphia		Mrazek	19,354	35–25–11	81	L
72	March 17	Philadelphia	4–2	Carolina		Lyon	14,805	36–25–11	83	W
73	March 18	Washington	3–6	Philadelphia		Mrazek	19,687	37–25–11	85	W
74	March 20	Philadelphia	4–5	Detroit	SO	Lyon	19,515	37–25–12	86	OTL
75	March 22	NY Rangers	3–4	Philadelphia		Lyon	19,584	38–25–12	88	W
76	March 25	Philadelphia	4–5	Pittsburgh	OT	Mrazek	18,655	38–25–13	89	OTL
77	March 27	Philadelphia	2–3	Dallas	OT	Mrazek	17,247	38–25–14	90	OTL
78	March 28	Philadelphia	2–1	Colorado		Neuvirth	16,320	39–25–14	92	W

April: 3–1–0 (home: 3–0–0; road: 0–1–0)

Game	Date	Visitor	Score	Home	OT	Decision	Attendance	Record	Points	Recap
79	April 1	Boston	3–4	Philadelphia	OT	Mrazek	19,904	40–25–14	94	W
80	April 3	Philadelphia	4–5	NY Islanders		Mrazek	11,951	40–26–14	94	L
81	April 5	Carolina	3–4	Philadelphia		Elliott	20,001	41–26–14	96	W
82	April 7	NY Rangers	0–5	Philadelphia		Elliott	20,028	42–26–14	98	W

Legend: W Win (2 points) L Loss (0 points) OTL Overtime/shootout loss (1 point)

=== Playoffs ===
2018 Stanley Cup playoffs
Eastern Conference First Round vs. (M2) Pittsburgh Penguins: Pittsburgh won 4–2

Game	Date	Visitor	Score	Home	OT	Decision	Attendance	Series	Recap
1	April 11	Philadelphia	0–7	Pittsburgh		Elliott	18,556	0–1	L
2	April 13	Philadelphia	5–1	Pittsburgh		Elliott	18,648	1–1	W
3	April 15	Pittsburgh	5–1	Philadelphia		Elliott	19,955	1–2	L
4	April 18	Pittsburgh	5–0	Philadelphia		Elliott	19,644	1–3	L
5	April 20	Philadelphia	4–2	Pittsburgh		Neuvirth	18,632	2–3	W
6	April 22	Pittsburgh	8–5	Philadelphia		Neuvirth	19,861	2–4	L

Legend: W Win L Loss

== Player statistics ==
=== Scoring ===
- Position abbreviations: C = Center; D = Defense; G = Goaltender; LW = Left wing; RW = Right wing
- † = Joined team via a transaction (e.g., trade, waivers, signing) during the season. Stats reflect time with the Flyers only.
- ‡ = Left team via a transaction (e.g., trade, waivers, release) during the season. Stats reflect time with the Flyers only.

No.	Player	Pos	Regular season						Playoffs					
No.	Player	Pos	GP	G	A	Pts	+/-	PIM	GP	G	A	Pts	+/-	PIM
28	Claude Giroux	LW	82	34	68	102	28	20	6	1	2	3	−10	2
93	Jakub Voracek	RW	82	20	65	85	10	50	6	0	3	3	−3	6
14	Sean Couturier	C	82	31	45	76	34	31	5	5	4	9	1	2
53	Shayne Gostisbehere	D	78	13	52	65	10	25	6	1	0	1	−8	4
11	Travis Konecny	C	81	24	23	47	17	46	6	1	0	1	−3	10
17	Wayne Simmonds	RW	75	24	22	46	−16	57	6	0	2	2	0	6
9	Ivan Provorov	D	82	17	24	41	17	20	6	0	3	3	−6	0
51	Valtteri Filppula	C	81	11	22	33	−7	20	6	1	2	3	−3	2
19	Nolan Patrick	C	73	13	17	30	1	30	6	1	1	2	−5	0
12	Michael Raffl	LW	76	13	9	22	9	28	6	0	1	1	−5	2
40	Jordan Weal	C	69	8	13	21	−10	12	1	0	0	0	−1	0
47	Andrew MacDonald	D	66	6	15	21	8	30	6	2	0	2	0	6
21	Scott Laughton	C	81	10	10	20	−10	42	6	1	0	1	1	6
23	Brandon Manning	D	65	7	12	19	0	56	6	0	0	0	−5	14
3	Radko Gudas	D	70	2	14	16	0	83	6	0	0	0	−1	9
6	Travis Sanheim	D	49	2	8	10	−6	20	4	1	0	1	−1	2
8	Robert Hagg	D	70	3	6	9	5	32	2	0	0	0	1	0
22	Dale Weise	RW	46	4	4	8	−7	21	2	0	0	0	−3	0
15	Jori Lehtera	C	62	3	5	8	−8	14	6	0	2	2	0	0
54	Oskar Lindblom	LW	23	2	4	6	4	4	4	0	0	0	0	0
20	Taylor Leier	LW	39	1	4	5	−7	6	—	—	—	—	—	—
24	Matt Read	RW	19	1	0	1	−2	2	6	1	1	2	1	4
37	Brian Elliott	G	43	0	1	1		2	4	0	0	0		0
30	Michal Neuvirth	G	22	0	1	1		0	3	0	0	0		0
39	Mark Alt‡	D	8	0	0	0	0	2	—	—	—	—	—	—
56	Tyrell Goulbourne	LW	9	0	0	0	−2	2	—	—	—	—	—	—
49	Alex Lyon	G	11	0	0	0		0	—	—	—	—	—	—
70	Danick Martel	LW	4	0	0	0	−1	0	—	—	—	—	—	—
5	Samuel Morin	D	2	0	0	0	1	4	—	—	—	—	—	—
34	Petr Mrazek†	G	17	0	0	0		0	1	0	0	0		0
45	Will O'Neill	D	1	0	0	0	0	0	—	—	—	—	—	—
29	Johnny Oduya†	D	1	0	0	0	−1	0	—	—	—	—	—	—

=== Goaltending ===
No.	Player	Regular season											Playoffs									
No.	Player	GP	GS	W	L	OT	SA	GA	GAA	SV%	SO	TOI	GP	GS	W	L	SA	GA	GAA	SV%	SO	TOI
37	Brian Elliott	43	42	23	11	7	1,116	112	2.66	.909	1	2,522	4	4	1	3	97	14	4.74	.856	0	177
30	Michal Neuvirth	22	18	9	7	3	530	45	2.60	.915	1	1,039	3	2	1	1	72	11	4.40	.847	0	150
34	Petr Mrazek†	17	15	6	6	3	401	49	3.22	.891	1	913	1	0	0	0	14	2	3.87	.857	0	31
47	Alex Lyon	11	7	4	2	1	232	22	2.75	.905	0	480	—	—	—	—	—	—	—	—	—	—

== Awards and records ==
=== Awards ===
Type	Award/honor	Recipient	Ref
League (annual)	NHL second All-Star team	Claude Giroux (Left wing)	
League (in-season)	NHL All-Star Game selection	Claude Giroux	
League (in-season)	NHL First Star of the Week	Claude Giroux (February 12)	
League (in-season)	NHL Second Star of the Week	Brian Elliott (December 18)	
League (in-season)	NHL Third Star of the Week	Wayne Simmonds (October 9)	
League (in-season)	NHL Third Star of the Week	Brian Elliott (December 11)	
League (in-season)	NHL Third Star of the Week	Claude Giroux (April 9)	
Team	Barry Ashbee Trophy	Shayne Gostisbehere	
Team	Bobby Clarke Trophy	Claude Giroux	
Team	Gene Hart Memorial Award	Sean Couturier	
Team	Pelle Lindbergh Memorial Trophy	Sean Couturier	
Team	Toyota Cup	Claude Giroux	
Team	Yanick Dupre Memorial Class Guy Award	Sean Couturier	

=== Records ===
Among the team records set during the 2017–18 season was Michael Raffl and Claude Giroux combining to score the fastest two goals in team history, scoring six seconds apart during the season finale on April 7. Excluding the shortened 2019–20 and 2020–21 seasons, the Flyers 679 penalty minutes on the season is an all-time franchise low. Giroux’s –10 plus/minus rating during the playoffs is a franchise worst.

=== Milestones ===
Milestone	Player	Date	Ref
First game	Nolan Patrick	October 4, 2017	
First game	Travis Sanheim	October 5, 2017	
First game	Will O'Neill	November 2, 2017	
First game	Danick Martel	November 22, 2017	
First game	Tyrell Goulbourne	January 6, 2018	
First game	Alex Lyon	January 31, 2018	
First game	Oskar Lindblom	February 20, 2018	

== Transactions ==
The Flyers were involved in the following transactions from June 12, 2017, the day after the deciding game of the 2017 Stanley Cup Final, through June 7, 2018, the day of the deciding game of the 2018 Stanley Cup Final.

=== Trades ===
Date	Details		Ref
June 16, 2017	To Arizona Coyotes: Nick Cousins; Rights to Merrick Madsen	To Philadelphia Flyers: Rights to Brendan Warren; 5th-round pick in 2018	
June 23, 2017	To St. Louis Blues: Brayden Schenn	To Philadelphia Flyers: Jori Lehtera; Capitals' 1st-round pick in 2017; Conditional 1st-round pick in 2018 (Note: St. Louis had the option of keeping the 2018 first-rounder if it was a top 10 pick. The Blues missed the playoffs and lost the draft lottery, giving the Flyers their 2018 first-round pick (14th overall). If the Blues had won the draft lottery, the Flyers would have instead received the Blues' 1st-round pick in 2019 and 3rd-round pick in 2020.)	
June 24, 2017	To Arizona Coyotes: 2nd-round pick in 2017; 3rd-round pick in 2017; Islanders' 4th-round pick in 2017	To Philadelphia Flyers: 2nd-round pick in 2017	
June 24, 2017	To Montreal Canadiens: 7th-round pick in 2017	To Philadelphia Flyers: 7th-round pick in 2018	
October 9, 2017	To Anaheim Ducks: Future considerations	To Philadelphia Flyers: Dustin Tokarski	
February 19, 2018	To Detroit Red Wings: Conditional 4th-round pick in 2018 (Note: If the Flyers made the playoffs and Mrazek won 5 regular season games for Philadelphia, the pick would be upgraded to a 3rd-rounder. This condition was met on April 7 when the Flyers clinched a playoff spot. Additionally, if the Flyers reached the Eastern Conference Finals and Mrazek won 6 playoff games for Philadelphia, the pick would have been upgraded to a 2nd-rounder, but this condition was not met.); Conditional 3rd-round pick in 2019 (Note: Condition not met. The Red Wings would have received the pick if the Flyers re-signed Mrazek for the 2018–19 season, which they did not.)	To Philadelphia Flyers: Petr Mrazek (Note: The Red Wings retained half of Mrazek's remaining salary.)	
March 21, 2018	To Edmonton Oilers: Rights to Cooper Marody	To Philadelphia Flyers: Devils' 3rd-round pick in 2019	

=== Players acquired ===
Date	Player	Former team	Term	Via	Ref
July 1, 2017	Brian Elliott	Calgary Flames	2-year	Free agency	
July 1, 2017	Corban Knight	Lehigh Valley Phantoms (AHL)	2-year	Free agency	
July 1, 2017	Phil Varone	Ottawa Senators	2-year	Free agency	
February 26, 2018	John Muse	Lehigh Valley Phantoms (AHL)	1-year	Free agency	
February 26, 2018	Johnny Oduya	Ottawa Senators		Waivers	

=== Players lost ===
Date	Player	New team	Via (Note: In parentheses is the player's free agency group on July 1 if applicable.)	Ref
June 21, 2017	Pierre-Edouard Bellemare	Vegas Golden Knights	Expansion draft	
July 1, 2017	Michael Del Zotto	Vancouver Canucks	Free agency (III)	
July 1, 2017	Boyd Gordon (Note: Gordon retired.)		Contract expiration (III)	
July 1, 2017	Steve Mason	Winnipeg Jets	Free agency (III)	
July 1, 2017	Nick Schultz (Note: Schultz retired.)		Contract expiration (III)	
July 3, 2017	Roman Lyubimov	CSKA Moscow (KHL)	Free agency (II) (Note: Philadelphia retained Lyubimov’s NHL rights through the 2018–19 season.)	
July 6, 2017	Chris Conner	Lehigh Valley Phantoms (AHL)	Free agency (III)	
November 30, 2017	Chris VandeVelde	Lukko (Liiga)	Free agency (III)	
February 26, 2018	Mark Alt	Colorado Avalanche	Waivers	
June 19, 2018	Colin McDonald	Lehigh Valley Phantoms (AHL)	Free agency	

=== Signings ===
Date	Player	Term	Contract type	Ref
June 27, 2017	Mark Alt	1-year	Re-signing	
June 29, 2017	Jordan Weal	2-year	Re-signing	
July 1, 2017	Mike Vecchione	2-year	Re-signing	
July 11, 2017	Scott Laughton	2-year	Re-signing	
July 14, 2017	Taylor Leier	1-year	Re-signing	
July 15, 2017	Cole Bardreau	2-year	Re-signing	
July 15, 2017	Alex Lyon	1-year	Re-signing	
July 15, 2017	Anthony Stolarz	1-year	Re-signing	
July 17, 2017	Nolan Patrick	3-year	Entry-level	
August 3, 2017	Morgan Frost	3-year	Entry-level	
August 3, 2017	Isaac Ratcliffe	3-year	Entry-level	
March 6, 2018	T. J. Brennan	2-year	Extension	
March 11, 2018	Carsen Twarynski	3-year	Entry-level	
March 13, 2018	Maxim Sushko	3-year	Entry-level	
March 15, 2018	Matthew Strome	3-year	Entry-level	
March 27, 2018	Felix Sandstrom	3-year	Entry-level	
May 4, 2018	David Kase	3-year	Entry-level	

== Draft picks ==
Below are the Philadelphia Flyers' selections at the 2017 NHL entry draft, held on June 23–24, 2017 at the United Center in Chicago, Illinois.

Round	Pick	Player	Position	Nationality	Team (league)	Notes
1	2	Nolan Patrick	Center	Canada	Brandon Wheat Kings (WHL)	
1	27	Morgan Frost	Center	Canada	Sault Ste. Marie Greyhounds (OHL)	(Note: The Flyers acquired this pick in a trade with the St. Louis Blues along with Jori Lehtera and a 2018 conditional first-round draft pick for Brayden Schenn on June 23, 2017)
2	35	Isaac Ratcliffe	Left wing	Canada	Guelph Storm (OHL)	(Note: The Flyers acquired this draft pick from the Arizona Coyotes for their 2nd-round pick, their 3rd-round pick, and the New York Islanders' 4th-round pick on June 24, 2017.)
3	80	Kirill Ustimenko	Goaltender	Russia	MHK Dynamo St. Petersburg (MHL)	(Note: The Flyers acquired this pick in a trade with the Boston Bruins for Zac Rinaldo on June 29, 2015)
4	106	Matthew Strome	Left wing	Canada	Hamilton Bulldogs (OHL)	
4	107	Maxim Sushko	Right wing	Belarus	Owen Sound Attack (OHL)	(Note: The Flyers acquired Valtteri Filppula, Tampa Bay's fourth-round pick, and Los Angeles' seventh-round pick in a trade with the Tampa Bay Lightning for Mark Streit on March 1, 2017.)
5	137	Noah Cates	Left wing	United States	Omaha Lancers (USHL)	
6	168	Olle Lycksell	Center	Sweden	Linkopings HC (J20 SuperElit)	
7	196	Wyatt Kalynuk	Defense	Canada	Bloomington Thunder (USHL)	
