= 2017–18 New Jersey Devils season =

National Hockey League season

2017–18 New Jersey Devils
- Division: 5th Metropolitan
- Conference: 8th Eastern
- 2017–18 record: 44–29–9
- Home record: 23–14–4
- Road record: 21–15–5
- Goals for: 248
- Goals against: 244

Team information
- General manager: Ray Shero
- Coach: John Hynes
- Captain: Andy Greene
- Alternate captains: Taylor Hall (Nov.–Apr.); Adam Henrique (Oct.–Nov.); Marcus Johansson (Nov.–Apr.); Kyle Palmieri (Nov.–Apr.); Travis Zajac
- Arena: Prudential Center
- Average attendance: 15,200
- Minor league affiliates: Binghamton Devils (AHL); Adirondack Thunder (ECHL)

Team leaders
- Goals: Taylor Hall (39)
- Assists: Taylor Hall (54)
- Points: Taylor Hall (93)
- Penalty minutes: Miles Wood (84)
- Plus/minus: Taylor Hall (+14)
- Wins: Keith Kinkaid (26)
- Goals against average: Keith Kinkaid (2.77)

The 2017–18 New Jersey Devils season was the 44th season for the National Hockey League (NHL) franchise that was established on June 11, 1974, and 36th season since the franchise relocated from Colorado prior to the 1982–83 NHL season. The Devils received the first overall pick in the 2017 NHL entry draft for the first time in franchise history by winning the draft lottery held on April 29, 2017. They used this pick to select Nico Hischier who was also the first Swiss player to be selected first overall. Taylor Hall set a Devils record for the longest point streak at 26 games, which is also the longest point streak in the 2017–18 season. The team also set their best start in franchise history, going 9–2–0 in their first 11 games of the season. This season also saw the team trade Adam Henrique in exchange for Sami Vatanen and also acquired Patrick Maroon and Michael Grabner. The season also saw the franchise successfully make it back to the Stanley Cup playoffs for the first time since 2012. The Devils would lose to the Tampa Bay Lightning 4–1 in the first round.

== Standings ==
=== Divisional standings ===
Metropolitan Division
Pos	Team	GP	W	L	OTL	ROW	GF	GA	GD	Pts
1	y – Washington Capitals	82	49	26	7	46	259	239	+20	105
2	x – Pittsburgh Penguins	82	47	29	6	45	272	250	+22	100
3	x – Philadelphia Flyers	82	42	26	14	40	251	243	+8	98
4	x – Columbus Blue Jackets	82	45	30	7	39	242	230	+12	97
5	x – New Jersey Devils	82	44	29	9	39	248	244	+4	97
6	Carolina Hurricanes	82	36	35	11	33	228	256	−28	83
7	New York Islanders	82	35	37	10	32	264	296	−32	80
8	New York Rangers	82	34	39	9	31	231	268	−37	77

Source: National Hockey League
x – Clinched playoff spot; y – Clinched division

=== Conference standings ===
Eastern Conference Wild Card
Pos	Div	Team	GP	W	L	OTL	ROW	GF	GA	GD	Pts
1	ME	x – Columbus Blue Jackets	82	45	30	7	39	242	230	+12	97
2	ME	x – New Jersey Devils	82	44	29	9	39	248	244	+4	97
3	AT	Florida Panthers	82	44	30	8	41	248	246	+2	96
4	ME	Carolina Hurricanes	82	36	35	11	33	228	256	−28	83
5	ME	New York Islanders	82	35	37	10	32	264	296	−32	80
6	ME	New York Rangers	82	34	39	9	31	231	268	−37	77
7	AT	Detroit Red Wings	82	30	39	13	25	217	255	−38	73
8	AT	Montreal Canadiens	82	29	40	13	27	209	264	−55	71
9	AT	Ottawa Senators	82	28	43	11	26	221	291	−70	67
10	AT	Buffalo Sabres	82	25	45	12	24	199	280	−81	62

Source: National Hockey League
x – Clinched playoff spot

== Schedule and results ==
=== Preseason ===
The preseason schedule was published on June 11, 2017, which includes seven games (two at home and five as visitors).

2017 preseason game log: 5–1–1 (Home: 2–0–0; Road: 3–1–1)
#	Date	Visitor	Score	Home	OT	Decision	Attendance	Record	Recap
1	September 18	Washington	1–4	New Jersey		Kinkaid	6,310	1–0–0	Recap
2	September 20	New Jersey	3–4	NY Rangers	OT	Blackwood	17,967	1–0–1	Recap
3	September 21	New Jersey	4–1	Montreal		Kinkaid	21,288	2–0–1	Recap
4	September 23	NY Rangers	1–2	New Jersey		Schneider	12,208	3–0–1	Recap
5^{[A]}	September 25	New Jersey	0–3	NY Islanders		Kinkaid	5,615	3–1–1	Recap
6^{[A]}^{[a]}	September 25	New Jersey	8–1	Ottawa		—	—	4–1–1	Recap
7	September 27	New Jersey	4–1	Washington		Schneider	14,858	5–1–1	Recap
Notes:^{A} Indicates split-squad.^{a} Game was played at Consolidated Credit Union Place in Summerside, Prince Edward Island.

=== Regular season ===
The regular season schedule was released on June 22, 2017.

2017–18 game log

October: 8–2–0 (Home: 4–2–0; Road: 4–0–0)
#	Date	Visitor	Score	Home	OT	Decision	Attendance	Record	Pts	Recap
1	October 7	Colorado	1–4	New Jersey		Schneider	16,514	1–0–0	2	Recap
2	October 9	New Jersey	6–2	Buffalo		Schneider	17,697	2–0–0	4	Recap
3	October 11	New Jersey	6–3	Toronto		Schneider	19,103	3–0–0	6	Recap
4	October 13	Washington	5–2	New Jersey		Schneider	13,458	3–1–0	6	Recap
5	October 14	New Jersey	3–2	NY Rangers		Kinkaid	18,006	4–1–0	8	Recap
6	October 17	Tampa Bay	4–5	New Jersey	SO	Schneider	13,176	5–1–0	10	Recap
7	October 19	New Jersey	5–4	Ottawa	OT	Kinkaid	13,364	6–1–0	12	Recap
8	October 20	San Jose	3–0	New Jersey		Kinkaid	14,381	6–2–0	12	Recap
9	October 27	Ottawa	4–5	New Jersey	SO	Kinkaid	13,763	7–2–0	14	Recap
10	October 28	Arizona	3–4	New Jersey		Schneider	15,132	8–2–0	16	Recap

November: 6–4–4 (Home: 2–2–2; Road: 4–2–2)
#	Date	Visitor	Score	Home	OT	Decision	Attendance	Record	Pts	Recap
11	November 1	New Jersey	2–0	Vancouver		Schneider	16,855	9–2–0	18	Recap
12	November 3	New Jersey	3–6	Edmonton		Schneider	18,347	9–3–0	18	Recap
13	November 5	New Jersey	4–5	Calgary	SO	Kinkaid	17,839	9–3–1	19	Recap
14	November 7	St. Louis	3–1	New Jersey		Schneider	12,317	9–4–1	19	Recap
15	November 9	Edmonton	3–2	New Jersey	OT	Schneider	16,514	9–4–2	20	Recap
16	November 11	Florida	1–2	New Jersey		Schneider	16,514	10–4–2	22	Recap
17	November 12	New Jersey	7–5	Chicago		Kinkaid	21,487	11–4–2	24	Recap
18	November 16	New Jersey	0–1	Toronto	OT	Schneider	19,202	11–4–3	25	Recap
19	November 18	New Jersey	2–5	Winnipeg		Schneider	15,231	11–5–3	25	Recap
20	November 20	New Jersey	4–3	Minnesota	OT	Schneider	19,048	12–5–3	27	Recap
21	November 22	Boston	3–2	New Jersey	SO	Schneider	16,514	12–5–4	28	Recap
22	November 24	Vancouver	2–3	New Jersey		Schneider	16,514	13–5–4	30	Recap
23	November 25	New Jersey	4–3	Detroit	OT	Kinkaid	19,515	14–5–4	32	Recap
24	November 27	Florida	3–2	New Jersey		Schneider	13,184	14–6–4	32	Recap

December: 8–4–2 (Home: 6–1–1; Road: 2–3–1)
#	Date	Visitor	Score	Home	OT	Decision	Attendance	Record	Pts	Recap
25	December 1	New Jersey	2–1	Colorado		Schneider	14,614	15–6–4	34	Recap
26	December 2	New Jersey	0–5	Arizona		Kinkaid	14,338	15–7–4	34	Recap
27	December 5	New Jersey	4–1	Columbus		Schneider	14,282	16–7–4	36	Recap
28	December 8	Columbus	5–3	New Jersey		Schneider	16,514	16–8–4	36	Recap
29	December 9	New Jersey	2–5	NY Rangers		Kinkaid	18,006	16–9–4	36	Recap
30	December 12	Los Angeles	1–5	New Jersey		Schneider	13,275	17–9–4	38	Recap
31	December 14	New Jersey	1–2	Montreal	OT	Schneider	21,302	17–9–5	39	Recap
32	December 15	Dallas	2–5	New Jersey		Schneider	13,171	18–9–5	41	Recap
33	December 18	Anaheim	3–5	New Jersey		Schneider	16,514	19–9–5	43	Recap
34	December 21	NY Rangers	3–4	New Jersey	SO	Schneider	16,514	20–9–5	45	Recap
35	December 23	Chicago	1–4	New Jersey		Schneider	16,514	21–9–5	47	Recap
36	December 27	Detroit	1–3	New Jersey		Schneider	16,514	22–9–5	49	Recap
37	December 29	Buffalo	4–3	New Jersey	OT	Schneider	16,514	22–9–6	50	Recap
38	December 30	New Jersey	2–5	Washington		Schneider	18,506	22–10–6	50	Recap

January: 3–6–2 (Home: 1–3–0; Road: 2–3–2)
#	Date	Visitor	Score	Home	OT	Decision	Attendance	Record	Pts	Recap
39	January 2	New Jersey	2–3	St. Louis	SO	Kinkaid	18,324	22–10–7	51	Recap
40	January 4	New Jersey	3–4	Dallas		Schneider	18,114	22–11–7	51	Recap
41	January 7	New Jersey	4–5	NY Islanders	SO	Schneider	15,136	22–11–8	52	Recap
42	January 13	Philadelphia	5–3	New Jersey		Schneider	16,514	22–12–8	52	Recap
43	January 16	New Jersey	4–1	NY Islanders		Kinkaid	12,695	23–12–8	54	Recap
44	January 18	Washington	3–4	New Jersey	OT	Kinkaid	14,163	24–12–8	56	Recap
45	January 20	New Jersey	1–3	Philadelphia		Kinkaid	19,934	24–13–8	56	Recap
46	January 22	Detroit	3–0	New Jersey		Schneider	13,847	24–14–8	56	Recap
47	January 23	New Jersey	2–3	Boston		Schneider	17,565	24–15–8	56	Recap
48	January 25	Nashville	3–0	New Jersey		Appleby	14,039	24–16–8	56	Recap
49	January 30	New Jersey	3–1	Buffalo		Kinkaid	17,460	25–16–8	58	Recap

February: 8–6–0 (Home: 4–4–0; Road: 4–2–0)
#	Date	Visitor	Score	Home	OT	Decision	Attendance	Record	Pts	Recap
50	February 1	Philadelphia	3–4	New Jersey		Kinkaid	13,906	26–16–8	60	Recap
51	February 3	Pittsburgh	1–3	New Jersey		Kinkaid	16,514	27–16–8	62	Recap
52	February 6	New Jersey	3–5	Ottawa		Kinkaid	13,991	27–17–8	62	Recap
53	February 8	Calgary	3–2	New Jersey		Kinkaid	13,085	27–18–8	62	Recap
54	February 10	New Jersey	1–6	Columbus		Kinkaid	18,510	27–19–8	62	Recap
55	February 11	Boston	5–3	New Jersey		Läck	16,514	27–20–8	62	Recap
56	February 13	New Jersey	5–4	Philadelphia	SO	Kinkaid	19,312	28–20–8	64	Recap
57	February 15	Carolina	2–5	New Jersey		Kinkaid	14,079	29–20–8	66	Recap
58	February 17	New Jersey	4–3	Tampa Bay		Läck	19,092	30–20–8	68	Recap
59	February 18	New Jersey	3–2	Carolina	OT	Kinkaid	18,680	31–20–8	70	Recap
60	February 20	Columbus	2–1	New Jersey		Kinkaid	14,024	31–21–8	70	Recap
61	February 22	Minnesota	4–2	New Jersey		Läck	13,316	31–22–8	70	Recap
62	February 24	NY Islanders	1–2	New Jersey		Kinkaid	16,514	32–22–8	72	Recap
63	February 27	New Jersey	3–2	Pittsburgh		Kinkaid	18,581	33–22–8	74	Recap

March: 8–6–1 (Home: 4–2–1; Road: 4–4–0)
#	Date	Visitor	Score	Home	OT	Decision	Attendance	Record	Pts	Recap
64	March 1	New Jersey	2–3	Florida		Schneider	10,846	33–23–8	74	Recap
65	March 2	New Jersey	1–3	Carolina		Kinkaid	14,337	33–24–8	74	Recap
66	March 4	Vegas	3–2	New Jersey		Schneider	16,514	33–25–8	74	Recap
67	March 6	Montreal	4–6	New Jersey		Kinkaid	14,586	34–25–8	76	Recap
68	March 8	Winnipeg	3–2	New Jersey		Schneider	14,023	34–26–8	76	Recap
69	March 10	New Jersey	3–2	Nashville	SO	Kinkaid	17,545	35–26–8	78	Recap
70	March 14	New Jersey	8–3	Vegas		Kinkaid	18,420	36–26–8	80	Recap
71	March 17	New Jersey	3–0	Los Angeles		Kinkaid	18,230	37–26–8	82	Recap
72	March 18	New Jersey	2–4	Anaheim		Kinkaid	16,401	37–27–8	82	Recap
73	March 20	New Jersey	2–6	San Jose		Schneider	17,209	37–28–8	82	Recap
74	March 23	New Jersey	4–3	Pittsburgh	OT	Kinkaid	18,658	38–28–8	84	Recap
75	March 24	Tampa Bay	1–2	New Jersey		Kinkaid	16,514	39–28–8	86	Recap
76	March 27	Carolina	3–4	New Jersey		Kinkaid	15,521	40–28–8	88	Recap
77	March 29	Pittsburgh	4–3	New Jersey	OT	Kinkaid	16,514	40–28–9	89	Recap
78	March 31	NY Islanders	3–4	New Jersey		Kinkaid	16,514	41–28–9	91	Recap

April: 3–1–0 (Home: 2–0–0; Road: 1–1–0)
#	Date	Visitor	Score	Home	OT	Decision	Attendance	Record	Pts	Recap
79	April 1	New Jersey	2–1	Montreal		Kinkaid	21,302	42–28–9	93	Recap
80	April 3	NY Rangers	2–5	New Jersey		Kinkaid	16,514	43–28–9	95	Recap
81	April 5	Toronto	1–2	New Jersey		Kinkaid	16,514	44–28–9	97	Recap
82	April 7	New Jersey	3–5	Washington		Schneider	18,506	44–29–9	97	Recap

Legend: Win (2 points) Loss (0 points) Overtime/shootout loss (1 point)

=== Playoffs ===
2018 Stanley Cup playoffs

Eastern Conference first round vs. (A1) Tampa Bay Lightning: Tampa Bay won 4–1
#	Date	Visitor	Score	Home	OT	Decision	Attendance	Series	Recap
1	April 12	New Jersey	2–5	Tampa Bay		Kinkaid	19,092	0–1	Recap
2	April 14	New Jersey	3–5	Tampa Bay		Kinkaid	19,092	0–2	Recap
3	April 16	Tampa Bay	2–5	New Jersey		Schneider	16,514	1–2	Recap
4	April 18	Tampa Bay	3–1	New Jersey		Schneider	16,514	1–3	Recap
5	April 21	New Jersey	1–3	Tampa Bay		Schneider	19,029	1–4	Recap

Legend: Win Loss

== Player statistics ==
As of April 16, 2018

=== Skaters ===
Regular season
Player	GP	G	A	Pts	+/−	PIM
Taylor Hall	76	39	54	93	14	34
Nico Hischier	82	20	32	52	10	26
Kyle Palmieri	62	24	20	44	−1	30
Will Butcher	81	5	39	44	1	8
Jesper Bratt	72	13	22	35	−16	18
Miles Wood	76	19	13	32	−6	84
Sami Vatanen^{†}	57	3	25	28	−1	32
Stefan Noesen	72	13	14	27	12	36
Travis Zajac	62	12	14	26	−8	25
Brian Gibbons	59	12	14	26	10	20
Blake Coleman	79	13	12	25	7	50
Pavel Zacha	69	8	17	25	−3	30
Damon Severson	76	9	15	24	−8	42
Brian Boyle	69	13	10	23	−9	45
John Moore	81	7	11	18	3	47
Drew Stafford	59	8	7	15	−20	10
Marcus Johansson	29	5	9	14	−11	14
Adam Henrique^{‡}	24	4	10	14	−5	6
Andy Greene	81	3	10	13	−9	21
Patrick Maroon^{†}	17	3	10	13	−4	13
Steven Santini	36	2	8	10	0	21
Jimmy Hayes	33	3	6	9	−2	6
Ben Lovejoy	57	2	6	8	7	25
Michael Grabner^{†}	21	2	3	5	0	4
Mirco Müller	28	0	4	4	1	4
Nick Lappin	3	1	0	1	2	2
John Quenneville	2	0	0	0	−3	0
Kevin Rooney	1	0	0	0	0	0
Dalton Prout^{‡}	4	0	0	0	−2	13

Playoffs
Player	GP	G	A	Pts	+/−	PIM
Taylor Hall	5	2	4	6	−1	6
Will Butcher	5	1	3	4	0	0
Kyle Palmieri	5	1	2	3	−4	6
Blake Coleman	5	2	0	2	1	4
Travis Zajac	5	1	1	2	0	0
Andy Greene	5	0	2	2	−4	6
Ben Lovejoy	5	1	0	1	1	2
Patrick Maroon	5	1	0	1	−2	0
Nico Hischier	5	1	0	1	−4	0
Stefan Noesen	4	1	0	1	1	4
Sami Vatanen	4	1	0	1	−1	0
John Moore	5	0	1	1	−1	12
Brian Boyle	5	0	0	0	1	14
Miles Wood	5	0	0	0	−1	14
Pavel Zacha	5	0	0	0	−1	6
Damon Severson	4	0	0	0	−1	12
Marcus Johansson	3	0	0	0	−2	0
Mirco Müller	3	0	0	0	−2	0
Drew Stafford	2	0	0	0	−1	10
Michael Grabner	2	0	0	0	1	0
Brian Gibbons	2	0	0	0	−2	0
Jesper Bratt	1	0	0	0	0	0

=== Goaltenders ===
Regular season
Player	GP	GS	TOI	W	L	OT	GA	GAA	SA	SV%	SO	G	A	PIM
Cory Schneider	40	40	2,333	17	16	6	114	2.93	1,228	.907	1	0	0	0
Keith Kinkaid	41	38	2,298	26	10	3	106	2.77	1,214	.913	1	0	0	0
Eddie Läck^{†}	4	3	208	1	2	0	11	3.19	102	.903	0	0	0	0
Ken Appleby	3	1	124	0	1	0	3	3.10	55	.945	0	0	0	0

Playoffs
Player	GP	GS	TOI	W	L	GA	GAA	SA	SV%	SO	G	A	PIM
Keith Kinkaid	2	2	92	0	2	9	5.87	46	.804	0	0	0	0
Cory Schneider	4	3	202	1	2	6	1.78	113	.950	0	0	1	0

- ^{†} Denotes player spent time with another team before joining the Devils. Stats reflect time with the Devils only.
- ^{‡} Denotes player was traded mid-season. Stats reflect time with the Devils only.
- Bold/italics denotes franchise record.

== Awards and honors ==
=== Awards ===
Regular season
Player	Award	Date
Brian Boyle	Bill Masterton Memorial Trophy	June 20, 2018
Taylor Hall	Hart Memorial Trophy	June 20, 2018

== Transactions ==
The Devils have been involved in the following transactions during the 2017–18 season.

=== Trades ===
Date	Details		Ref
July 3, 2017	To Washington Capitals FLA's 2nd-round pick in 2018; TOR's 3rd-round pick in 2018	To New Jersey Devils Marcus Johansson	
October 28, 2017	To Arizona Coyotes Scott Wedgewood	To New Jersey Devils CGY's 5th-round pick in 2018	
November 30, 2017	To Anaheim Ducks Joseph Blandisi; Adam Henrique; NJD's 3rd-round pick in 2018	To New Jersey Devils Sami Vatanen; Conditional 3rd-round pick in 2019 or 2020	
December 14, 2017	To Arizona Coyotes Ryan Kujawinski	To New Jersey Devils Michael Latta	
December 30, 2017	To Calgary Flames Dalton Prout	To New Jersey Devils Eddie Läck	
February 8, 2018	To Minnesota Wild Viktor Lööv	To New Jersey Devils Christoph Bertschy; Mario Lucia	
February 22, 2018	To New York Rangers Yegor Rykov; 2nd-round pick in 2018	To New Jersey Devils Michael Grabner	
February 26, 2018	To Edmonton Oilers J. D. Dudek; 3rd-round pick in 2019	To New Jersey Devils Patrick Maroon	

=== Free agents acquired ===
Date	Player	Former team	Contract terms (in U.S. dollars)	Ref
July 1, 2017	Brian Boyle	Toronto Maple Leafs	2-year, $5.1 million	
July 1, 2017	Brian Gibbons	Albany Devils	1-year, $650,000	
July 1, 2017	Bracken Kearns	New York Islanders	1-year, $650,000	
July 1, 2017	Brian Strait	Winnipeg Jets	1-year, $650,000	
August 25, 2017	Drew Stafford	Boston Bruins	1-year, $800,000	
August 27, 2017	Will Butcher	Denver Pioneers	2-year, $1.85 million entry-level contract	
October 1, 2017	Jimmy Hayes	Boston Bruins	1-year, $700,000	
March 24, 2018	Cam Johnson	North Dakota Fighting Hawks	1-year, $925,000 entry-level contract	
May 21, 2018	Egor Yakovlev	SKA Saint Petersburg	1-year, $925,000 entry-level contract	

=== Free agents lost ===
Date	Player	New team	Contract terms (in U.S. dollars)	Ref
July 1, 2017	Beau Bennett	St. Louis Blues	1-year, $650,000	
July 1, 2017	Michael Cammalleri	Los Angeles Kings	1-year, $1 million	
July 1, 2017	Seth Helgeson	New York Islanders	1-year, $650,000	
July 1, 2017	Jacob Josefson	Buffalo Sabres	1-year, $700,000	
July 2, 2017	Luke Gazdic	Calgary Flames	1-year, $650,000	
July 3, 2017	Devante Smith-Pelly	Washington Capitals	1-year, $650,000	
July 4, 2017	Andrew MacWilliam	Rochester Americans	1-year	
July 10, 2017	Yohann Auvitu	Edmonton Oilers	1-year, $650,000	
July 21, 2017	Carter Camper	Cleveland Monsters	2-year	
April 27, 2018	Christoph Bertschy	Lausanne	4-year	
May 18, 2018	Yaroslav Dyblenko	SKA Saint Petersburg	4-year	

=== Claimed via waivers ===
Player	Previous team	Date	Ref

=== Lost via waivers ===
Player	New team	Date	Ref

=== Players released ===
Date	Player	Via	Ref
May 8, 2018	Yaroslav Dyblenko	Contract termination	

=== Lost via retirement ===
Date	Player	Ref

=== Player signings ===
Date	Player	Contract terms (in U.S. dollars)	Ref
June 29, 2017	Keith Kinkaid	2-year, $1.5 million	
July 15, 2017	Nico Hischier	3-year, $2.775 million entry-level contract	
July 25, 2017	Joseph Blandisi	2-year, $1.36 million	
July 25, 2017	Mirco Müller	2-year, $1.7 million	
July 25, 2017	Scott Wedgewood	1-year, $650,000	
July 26, 2017	Blake Coleman	1-year, $660,000	
July 26, 2017	Stefan Noesen	1-year, $660,000	
July 26, 2017	Blake Pietila	2-year, $667,500	
July 26, 2017	Kevin Rooney	1-year, $650,000	
July 26, 2017	Ben Thomson	1-year, $650,000	
September 11, 2017	Damon Severson	6-year, $25 million	
March 16, 2018	Brett Seney	2-year, $1.65 million entry-level contract	
April 2, 2018	Marian Studenič	3-year, $2.775 million entry-level contract	
April 15, 2018	Joey Anderson	3-year, $2.775 million entry-level contract	
May 8, 2018	Brian Strait	2-year, $1.35 million contract extension	

== Draft picks ==
Below are the New Jersey Devils' selections at the 2017 NHL entry draft, which was held on June 23 and 24, 2017, at the United Center in Chicago.

Round	#	Player	Pos	Nationality	College/junior/club team
1	1	Nico Hischier	C	Switzerland	Halifax Mooseheads (QMJHL)
2	36	Jesper Boqvist	C	Sweden	Brynäs IF (SHL)
3	63^{1}	Fabian Zetterlund	LW	Sweden	Färjestad BK (J20 SuperElit)
3	81^{2}	Reilly Walsh	D	United States	Chicago Steel (USHL)
4	98	Nikita Popugaev	RW	Russia	Prince George Cougars (WHL)
5	129	Gilles Senn	G	Switzerland	HC Davos (NLA)
5	143^{3}	Marian Studenič	RW	Slovakia	Hamilton Bulldogs (OHL)
6	160	Aarne Talvitie	C	Finland	Blues U20 (Jr. A SM-liiga)
7	191	Jockton Chainey	D	Canada	Halifax Mooseheads (QMJHL)
7	205	Yegor Zaitsev	D	Russia	Dynamo Moscow (KHL)
7	214	Matthew Hellickson	D	United States	Sioux City Musketeers (USHL)

1. The Colorado Avalanche's third-round pick went the New Jersey Devils as the result of a trade on February 29, 2016, that sent Eric Gelinas to Colorado in exchange for this pick.
2. The San Jose Sharks' third-round pick went to the New Jersey Devils as compensation for San Jose signing Peter DeBoer as their head coach on May 28, 2015.
3. The San Jose Sharks' fifth-round pick went to the New Jersey Devils as the result of a trade on June 17, 2017, that sent Boston's second-round pick and Nashville's fourth-round pick both in 2017 to San Jose in exchange for Mirco Müller and this pick.
