= 2017–18 Toronto Maple Leafs season =

NHL hockey team season

2017–18 Toronto Maple Leafs
- Division: 3rd Atlantic
- Conference: 4th Eastern
- 2017–18 record: 49–26–7
- Home record: 29–10–2
- Road record: 20–16–5
- Goals for: 277
- Goals against: 232

Team information
- General manager: Lou Lamoriello
- Coach: Mike Babcock
- Captain: Vacant
- Alternate captains: Tyler Bozak; Leo Komarov; Morgan Rielly
- Arena: Air Canada Centre
- Average attendance: 19,187
- Minor league affiliates: Toronto Marlies (AHL); Orlando Solar Bears (ECHL)

Team leaders
- Goals: James van Riemsdyk (36)
- Assists: Jake Gardiner; Mitch Marner (47)
- Points: Mitch Marner (69)
- Penalty minutes: Matt Martin (50)
- Plus/minus: Auston Matthews (+25)
- Wins: Frederik Andersen (38)
- Goals against average: Curtis McElhinney (2.15)

The 2017–18 Toronto Maple Leafs season was the 101st season for the National Hockey League (NHL) franchise that was established on November 22, 1917, and its 91st season since adopting the Maple Leafs name in February 1927.

The Maple Leafs posted a regular season record of 49 wins, 26 losses and 7 overtime/shootout losses for 105 points, qualifying for the Stanley Cup playoffs for the second consecutive season for the first time since the 2002–03 season and the 2003–04 season. They set a new franchise record in wins and wins at home. After coming back from 1–3 series, they went on to lose versus the Boston Bruins in game seven in the first round.

== Regular season ==
The Maple Leafs set a new franchise record in wins when they earned their 46th win of the season on March 28, 2018, and as well set a new franchise record for wins at home. The following day, the Leafs officially clinched a playoff spot for a second consecutive season.

The Maple Leafs had a good year against Canadian teams, with a record of 12–4–0. They won all games versus Montreal, Edmonton and Calgary. They split the series with Ottawa, Winnipeg and Vancouver.

On December 19, 2017, to mark the 100th anniversary of their first game, the Maple Leafs held a special game, branded as the "Next Century Game", in which they defeated the Carolina Hurricanes 8–1. To mark the historic occasion, the team wore commemorative Toronto Arenas uniforms during the game inspired by those worn by the franchise's original namesake, the Arenas.

== Standings ==
Atlantic Division
Pos	Team	GP	W	L	OTL	ROW	GF	GA	GD	Pts
1	z – Tampa Bay Lightning	82	54	23	5	48	296	236	+60	113
2	x – Boston Bruins	82	50	20	12	47	270	214	+56	112
3	x – Toronto Maple Leafs	82	49	26	7	42	277	232	+45	105
4	Florida Panthers	82	44	30	8	41	248	246	+2	96
5	Detroit Red Wings	82	30	39	13	25	217	255	−38	73
6	Montreal Canadiens	82	29	40	13	27	209	264	−55	71
7	Ottawa Senators	82	28	43	11	26	221	291	−70	67
8	Buffalo Sabres	82	25	45	12	24	199	280	−81	62

Source: National Hockey League
x – Clinched playoff spot; z – Clinched conference

== Schedule and results ==
=== Preseason ===
2017 preseason: 5–2–1 (Home: 2–1–1; Road: 3–1–0)

Game	Date	Opponent	Score	OT	Decision	Location	Attendance	Record	Recap
1	September 18	@ Ottawa Senators	2–6		McElhinney	Canadian Tire Centre	14,931	0–1–0	Recap
2	September 19	Ottawa Senators	2–5		Kaskisuo	Air Canada Centre	18,847	0–2–0	Recap
3	September 22	Buffalo Sabres	3–0		–	Ricoh Coliseum	–	1–2–0	Recap
4	September 23	@ Buffalo Sabres	3–1		Kaskisuo	KeyBank Center	17,345	2–2–0	Recap
5	September 25	Montreal Canadiens	5–1		Andersen	Ricoh Coliseum	–	3–2–0	Recap
6	September 27	@ Montreal Canadiens	4–2		McElhinney	Videotron Centre	–	4–2–0	Recap
7	September 29	@ Detroit Red Wings	4–2		Andersen	Little Caesars Arena	17,746	5–2–0	Recap
8	September 30	Detroit Red Wings	2–3	SO	McElhinney	Ricoh Coliseum	–	5–2–1	Recap

=== Regular season ===
2017–18 game log: 49–26–7, 105 points (Home: 29–10–2; Road: 20–16–5)
October: 7–5–0, 14 points (Home: 4–3–0; Road: 3–2–0)

Game	Date	Opponent	Score	OT	Decision	Location	Attendance	Record	Points	Recap
1	October 4	@ Winnipeg Jets	7–2		Andersen (1–0–0)	Bell MTS Place	15,321	1–0–0	2	Recap
2	October 7	New York Rangers	8–5		Andersen (2–0–0)	Air Canada Centre	19,621	2–0–0	4	Recap
3	October 9	Chicago Blackhawks	4–3	OT	Andersen (3–0–0)	Air Canada Centre	19,456	3–0–0	6	Recap
4	October 11	New Jersey Devils	3–6		Andersen (3–1–0)	Air Canada Centre	19,103	3–1–0	6	Recap
5	October 14	@ Montreal Canadiens	4–3	OT	Andersen (4–1–0)	Bell Centre	21,302	4–1–0	8	Recap
6	October 17	@ Washington Capitals	2–0		Andersen (5–1–0)	Capital One Arena	18,506	5–1–0	10	Recap
7	October 18	Detroit Red Wings	6–3		McElhinney (1–0–0)	Air Canada Centre	19,158	6–1–0	12	Recap
8	October 21	@ Ottawa Senators	3–6		Andersen (5–2–0)	Canadian Tire Centre	17,455	6–2–0	12	Recap
9	October 23	Los Angeles Kings	3–2		Andersen (6–2–0)	Air Canada Centre	19,235	7–2–0	14	Recap
10	October 26	Carolina Hurricanes	3–6		Andersen (6–3–0)	Air Canada Centre	19,070	7–3–0	14	Recap
11	October 28	Philadelphia Flyers	2–4		Andersen (6–4–0)	Air Canada Centre	19,317	7–4–0	14	Recap
12	October 30	@ San Jose Sharks	2–3		Andersen (6–5–0)	SAP Center	17,562	7–5–0	14	Recap

November: 10–4–1, 21 points (Home: 4–2–0; Road: 6–2–1)

Game	Date	Opponent	Score	OT	Decision	Location	Attendance	Record	Points	Recap
13	November 1	@ Anaheim Ducks	3–1		Andersen (7–5–0)	Honda Center	15,628	8–5–0	16	Recap
14	November 2	@ Los Angeles Kings	3–5		McElhinney (1–1–0)	Staples Center	18,230	8–6–0	16	Recap
15	November 4	@ St. Louis Blues	4–6		Andersen (7–6–0)	Scottrade Center	19,046	8–7–0	16	Recap
16	November 6	Vegas Golden Knights	4–3	SO	Andersen (8–6–0)	Air Canada Centre	19,398	9–7–0	18	Recap
17	November 8	Minnesota Wild	4–2		Andersen (9–6–0)	Air Canada Centre	19,049	10–7–0	20	Recap
18	November 10	Boston Bruins	3–2	OT	Andersen (10–6–0)	Air Canada Centre	19,381	11–7–0	22	Recap
19	November 11	@ Boston Bruins	4–1		McElhinney (2–1–0)	TD Garden	17,565	12–7–0	24	Recap
20	November 16	New Jersey Devils	1–0	OT	Andersen (11–6–0)	Air Canada Centre	19,202	13–7–0	26	Recap
21	November 18	@ Montreal Canadiens	6–0		Andersen (12–6–0)	Bell Centre	21,302	14–7–0	28	Recap
22	November 20	Arizona Coyotes	1–4		Andersen (12–7–0)	Air Canada Centre	19,196	14–8–0	28	Recap
23	November 22	@ Florida Panthers	1–2	SO	Andersen (12–7–1)	BB&T Center	15,256	14–8–1	29	Recap
24	November 24	@ Carolina Hurricanes	5–4		Andersen (13–7–1)	PNC Arena	15,241	15–8–1	31	Recap
25	November 25	Washington Capitals	2–4		McElhinney (2–2–0)	Air Canada Centre	19,404	15–9–1	31	Recap
26	November 28	@ Calgary Flames	4–1		Andersen (14–7–1)	Scotiabank Saddledome	19,289	16–9–1	33	Recap
27	November 30	@ Edmonton Oilers	6–4		Andersen (15–7–1)	Rogers Place	18,347	17–9–1	35	Recap

December: 6–6–1, 13 points (Home: 3–0–0; Road: 3–6–1)

Game	Date	Opponent	Score	OT	Decision	Location	Attendance	Record	Points	Recap
28	December 2	@ Vancouver Canucks	1–2		Andersen (15–8–1)	Rogers Arena	18,865	17–10–1	35	Recap
29	December 6	Calgary Flames	2–1	SO	Andersen (16–8–1)	Air Canada Centre	19,217	18–10–1	37	Recap
30	December 9	@ Pittsburgh Penguins	4–3		Andersen (17–8–1)	PPG Paints Arena	18,658	19–10–1	39	Recap
31	December 10	Edmonton Oilers	1–0		McElhinney (3–2–0)	Air Canada Centre	19,486	20–10–1	41	Recap
32	December 12	@ Philadelphia Flyers	2–4		Andersen (17–9–1)	Wells Fargo Center	19,077	20–11–1	41	Recap
33	December 14	@ Minnesota Wild	0–2		Andersen (17–10–1)	Xcel Energy Center	18,857	20–12–1	41	Recap
34	December 15	@ Detroit Red Wings	1–3		McElhinney (3–3–0)	Little Caesars Arena	19,515	20–13–1	41	Recap
35	December 19	Carolina Hurricanes	8–1		Andersen (18–10–1)	Air Canada Centre	19,288	21–13–1	43	Recap
36	December 20	@ Columbus Blue Jackets	2–4		McElhinney (3–4–0)	Nationwide Arena	17,708	21–14–1	43	Recap
37	December 23	@ New York Rangers	3–2		Andersen (19–10–1)	Madison Square Garden	18,006	22–14–1	45	Recap
38	December 28	@ Arizona Coyotes	7–4		Andersen (20–10–1)	Gila River Arena	17,125	23–14–1	47	Recap
39	December 29	@ Colorado Avalanche	3–4	OT	Pickard (0–0–1)	Pepsi Center	18,013	23–14–2	48	Recap
40	December 31	@ Vegas Golden Knights	3–6		Andersen (20–11–1)	T-Mobile Arena	18,118	23–15–2	48	Recap

January: 6–3–3, 15 points (Home: 3–3–2; Road: 3–0–1)

Game	Date	Opponent	Score	OT	Decision	Location	Attendance	Record	Points	Recap
41	January 2	Tampa Bay Lightning	0–2		Andersen (20–12–1)	Air Canada Centre	19,344	23–16–2	48	Recap
42	January 4	San Jose Sharks	3–2	SO	Andersen (21–12–1)	Air Canada Centre	19,132	24–16–2	50	Recap
43	January 6	Vancouver Canucks	3–2	SO	Andersen (22–12–1)	Air Canada Centre	19,361	25–16–2	52	Recap
44	January 8	Columbus Blue Jackets	2–3	OT	Andersen (22–12–2)	Air Canada Centre	18,933	25–16–3	53	Recap
45	January 10	Ottawa Senators	3–4		Andersen (22–13–2)	Air Canada Centre	19,117	25–17–3	53	Recap
46	January 16	St. Louis Blues	1–2	OT	Andersen (22–13–3)	Air Canada Centre	18,951	25–17–4	54	Recap
47	January 18	@ Philadelphia Flyers	2–3	OT	Andersen (22–13–4)	Wells Fargo Center	19,860	25–17–5	55	Recap
48	January 20	@ Ottawa Senators	4–3		Andersen (23–13–4)	Canadian Tire Centre	17,768	26–17–5	57	Recap
49	January 22	Colorado Avalanche	2–4		Andersen (23–14–4)	Air Canada Centre	18,979	26–18–5	57	Recap
50	January 24	@ Chicago Blackhawks	3–2	OT	Andersen (24–14–4)	United Center	21,563	27–18–5	59	Recap
51	January 25	@ Dallas Stars	4–1		McElhinney (4–4–0)	American Airlines Center	18,225	28–18–5	61	Recap
52	January 31	New York Islanders	5–0		Andersen (25–14–4)	Air Canada Centre	19,267	29–18–5	63	Recap

February: 10–2–2, 22 points (Home: 8–0–0; Road: 2–2–2)

Game	Date	Opponent	Score	OT	Decision	Location	Attendance	Record	Points	Recap
53	February 1	@ New York Rangers	4–0		McElhinney (5–4–0)	Madison Square Garden	18,006	30–18–5	65	Recap
54	February 3	@ Boston Bruins	1–4		Andersen (25–15–4)	TD Garden	17,565	30–19–5	65	Recap
55	February 5	Anaheim Ducks	7–4		McElhinney (6–4–0)	Air Canada Centre	19,055	31–19–5	67	Recap
56	February 7	Nashville Predators	3–2	SO	Andersen (26–15–4)	Air Canada Centre	18,878	32–19–5	69	Recap
57	February 10	Ottawa Senators	6–3		Andersen (27–15–4)	Air Canada Centre	19,477	33–19–5	71	Recap
58	February 12	Tampa Bay Lightning	4–3		Andersen (28–15–4)	Air Canada Centre	19,112	34–19–5	73	Recap
59	February 14	Columbus Blue Jackets	6–3		Andersen (29–15–4)	Air Canada Centre	18,890	35–19–5	75	Recap
60	February 17	@ Pittsburgh Penguins	3–5		Andersen (29–16–4)	PPG Paints Arena	18,647	35–20–5	75	Recap
61	February 18	@ Detroit Red Wings	3–2		McElhinney (7–4–0)	Little Caesars Arena	19,515	36–20–5	77	Recap
62	February 20	Florida Panthers	1–0		Andersen (30–16–4)	Air Canada Centre	18,961	37–20–5	79	Recap
63	February 22	New York Islanders	4–3	SO	Andersen (31–16–4)	Air Canada Centre	18,856	38–20–5	81	Recap
64	February 24	Boston Bruins	4–3		Andersen (32–16–4)	Air Canada Centre	19,370	39–20–5	83	Recap
65	February 26	@ Tampa Bay Lightning	3–4	SO	Andersen (32–16–5)	Amalie Arena	19,092	39–20–6	84	Recap
66	February 27	@ Florida Panthers	2–3	OT	McElhinney (7–4–1)	BB&T Center	14,265	39–20–7	85	Recap

March: 8–5–0, 16 points (Home: 5–2–0; Road: 3–3–0)

Game	Date	Opponent	Score	OT	Decision	Location	Attendance	Record	Points	Recap
67	March 3	@ Washington Capitals	2–5		Andersen (32–17–5)	Navy–Marine Corps Memorial Stadium	29,516 (outdoors)	39–21–7	85	Recap
68	March 5	@ Buffalo Sabres	3–5		Andersen (32–18–5)	KeyBank Center	18,705	39–22–7	85	Recap
69	March 10	Pittsburgh Penguins	5–2		Andersen (33–18–5)	Air Canada Centre	19,504	40–22–7	87	Recap
70	March 14	Dallas Stars	6–5	SO	McElhinney (8–4–1)	Air Canada Centre	18,918	41–22–7	89	Recap
71	March 15	@ Buffalo Sabres	5–2		McElhinney (9–4–1)	KeyBank Center	19,070	42–22–7	91	Recap
72	March 17	Montreal Canadiens	4–0		McElhinney (10–4–1)	Air Canada Centre	19,364	43–22–7	93	Recap
73	March 20	@ Tampa Bay Lightning	3–4		Andersen (33–19–5)	Amalie Arena	19,092	43–23–7	93	Recap
74	March 22	@ Nashville Predators	5–2		Andersen (34–19–5)	Bridgestone Arena	17,550	44–23–7	95	Recap
75	March 24	Detroit Red Wings	4–3		Andersen (35–19–5)	Air Canada Centre	19,154	45–23–7	97	Recap
76	March 26	Buffalo Sabres	2–3		Andersen (35–20–5)	Air Canada Centre	19,108	45–24–7	97	Recap
77	March 28	Florida Panthers	4–3		Andersen (36–20–5)	Air Canada Centre	18,893	46–24–7	99	Recap
78	March 30	@ New York Islanders	5–4		Andersen (37–20–5)	Barclays Center	13,018	47–24–7	101	Recap
79	March 31	Winnipeg Jets	1–3		McElhinney (10–5–1)	Air Canada Centre	19,101	47–25–7	101	Recap

April: 2–1–0, 4 points (Home: 2–0–0; Road: 0–1–0)

Game	Date	Opponent	Score	OT	Decision	Location	Attendance	Record	Points	Recap
80	April 2	Buffalo Sabres	5–2		McElhinney (11–5–1)	Air Canada Centre	18,846	48–25–7	103	Recap
81	April 5	@ New Jersey Devils	1–2		Andersen (37–21–5)	Prudential Center	16,514	48–26–7	103	Recap
82	April 7	Montreal Canadiens	4–2		Andersen (38–21–5)	Air Canada Centre	19,525	49–26–7	105	Recap

2017–18 schedule

Win (2 Points) Loss (0 points) Overtime/shootout loss (1 point)

=== Playoffs ===
2018 Stanley Cup playoffs
Eastern Conference First Round vs. (A2) Boston Bruins: Boston wins series 4–3

Game	Date	Opponent	Score	OT	Decision	Location	Attendance	Series	Recap
1	April 12	@ Boston Bruins	1–5		Andersen (0–1)	TD Garden	17,565	0–1	Recap
2	April 14	@ Boston Bruins	3–7		McElhinney (0–1)	TD Garden	17,565	0–2	Recap
3	April 16	Boston Bruins	4–2		Andersen (1–1)	Air Canada Centre	19,663	1–2	Recap
4	April 19	Boston Bruins	1–3		Andersen (1–2)	Air Canada Centre	19,689	1–3	Recap
5	April 21	@ Boston Bruins	4–3		Andersen (2–2)	TD Garden	17,565	2–3	Recap
6	April 23	Boston Bruins	3–1		Andersen (3–2)	Air Canada Centre	19,604	3–3	Recap
7	April 25	@ Boston Bruins	4–7		Andersen (3–3)	TD Garden	17,565	3–4	Recap

Win Loss If necessary

== Player statistics ==
Updated to game played April 25, 2018.

=== Skaters ===
Regular season
Player	GP	G	A	Pts	+/−	PIM
Mitch Marner	82	22	47	69	−1	26
Auston Matthews	62	34	29	63	25	12
William Nylander	82	20	41	61	20	10
Nazem Kadri	80	32	23	55	2	42
James van Riemsdyk	81	36	18	54	1	30
Morgan Rielly	76	6	46	52	−4	14
Jake Gardiner	82	5	47	52	9	32
Patrick Marleau	82	27	20	47	1	16
Tyler Bozak	81	11	32	43	6	28
Zach Hyman	82	15	25	40	22	37
Connor Brown	82	14	14	28	0	18
Ron Hainsey	80	4	19	23	12	20
Leo Komarov	74	7	12	19	0	31
Nikita Zaitsev	60	5	8	13	8	31
Travis Dermott	37	1	12	13	16	8
Dominic Moore	50	6	6	12	3	16
Connor Carrick	47	4	8	12	5	27
Matt Martin	50	3	9	12	0	50
Roman Polak	54	2	10	12	5	46
Andreas Borgman^{(a)}	48	3	8	11	4	28
Kasperi Kapanen	38	7	2	9	−1	4
Josh Leivo	16	1	3	4	0	6
Andreas Johnsson	9	2	1	3	−2	0
Justin Holl^{(a)}	2	2	0	2	5	0
Tomas Plekanec	17	0	2	2	−2	6
Frederik Gauthier^{(a)}	9	1	0	1	−4	0
Calle Rosen^{(a)}	4	0	1	1	−3	4
Eric Fehr^{(b)}	4	0	0	0	−1	2
Nikita Soshnikov^{(b)}	3	0	0	0	−2	0
Martin Marincin^{(a)}	2	0	0	0	−2	2

Playoffs
Player	GP	G	A	Pts	+/-	PIM
Mitch Marner	7	2	7	9	2	4
Patrick Marleau	7	4	1	5	0	4
Morgan Rielly	7	0	5	5	−2	4
James van Riemsdyk	7	3	1	4	−4	4
Tomas Plekanec	7	2	2	4	1	2
Tyler Bozak	7	2	2	4	−1	6
Zach Hyman	7	1	3	4	−3	4
William Nylander	7	1	3	4	−3	0
Connor Brown	7	1	2	3	0	0
Auston Matthews	7	1	1	2	−4	0
Andreas Johnsson	6	1	1	2	2	2
Jake Gardiner	7	0	2	2	−6	2
Nikita Zaitsev	7	0	2	2	−3	2
Nazem Kadri	4	0	2	2	0	19
Kasperi Kapanen	7	1	0	1	−3	0
Travis Dermott	7	1	0	1	−2	2
Ron Hainsey	7	0	1	1	0	4
Roman Polak	7	0	1	1	3	4
Dominic Moore	2	0	0	0	−1	0
Leo Komarov	2	0	0	0	−1	0

=== Goaltenders ===
Regular season
Player	GP	GS	TOI	W	L	OT	GA	GAA	SA	SV%	SO	G	A	PIM
Frederik Andersen	66	66	3,889:00	38	21	5	182	2.81	2,211	.918	5	0	1	2
Curtis McElhinney	18	15	980:00	11	5	1	35	2.15	528	.934	3	0	1	0
Calvin Pickard^{(a)}	1	1	62:35	0	0	1	4	3.83	28	.857	0	0	0	0

Playoffs
Player	GP	GS	TOI	W	L	GA	GAA	SA	SV%	SO	G	A	PIM
Frederik Andersen	7	7	368:00	3	3	23	3.76	221	.896	0	0	0	0
Curtis McElhinney	1	0	48:00	0	1	4	5.11	23	.826	0	0	0	0

^{(a)} Player currently playing for the minor league affiliate Toronto Marlies of the AHL
^{(b)} Player is no longer with the Leafs organization

== Awards and honours ==
=== Awards ===
Regular season
Player	Award	Awarded
Auston Matthews	NHL Second Star of the Week	October 16, 2017
Frederik Andersen	NHL Second Star of the Week	November 20, 2017
Frederik Andersen	NHL Second Star of the Month	December 1, 2017
Curtis McElhinney	NHL Third Star of the Week	March 19, 2018

== Transactions ==
=== Trades ===
Date	Details		Ref
October 7, 2017	To Vegas Golden Knights Tobias Lindberg; 6th-round pick in 2018	To Toronto Maple Leafs Calvin Pickard
February 15, 2018	To St. Louis Blues Nikita Soshnikov	To Toronto Maple Leafs 4th-round pick in 2019
February 20, 2018	To San Jose Sharks Eric Fehr	To Toronto Maple Leafs 7th-round pick in 2020
February 25, 2018	To Montreal Canadiens Kerby Rychel; Rinat Valiev; 2nd-round pick in 2018	To Toronto Maple Leafs Kyle Baun; Tomas Plekanec^{[Note 1]}
June 8, 2018	To Edmonton Oilers Rights to Nolan Vesey	To Toronto Maple Leafs conditional 7th-round pick in 2020

==== Notes ====
1. ^{Note 1} Montreal to retain 50% of salary as part of trade.

=== Free agents acquired ===
Date	Player	Former team	Contract terms (in U.S. dollars)	Ref
July 1, 2017	Ron Hainsey	Pittsburgh Penguins	2-year, $6 million	
July 1, 2017	Dominic Moore	Boston Bruins	1-year, $1 million	
July 1, 2017	Chris Mueller	Arizona Coyotes	2-year, $1.3 million	
July 1, 2017	Vincent LoVerde	Los Angeles Kings	2-year, $1.45 million	
July 2, 2017	Patrick Marleau	San Jose Sharks	3-year, $18.75 million	
March 17, 2018	Mason Marchment	Toronto Marlies	2-year, $1.85 million entry-level contract	
May 17, 2018	Par Lindholm	Skellefteå AIK	1-year, entry-level contract	
May 17, 2018	Igor Ozhiganov	CSKA Moscow	1-year, entry-level contract	

=== Free agents lost ===
Date	Player	New team	Contract terms (in U.S. dollars)	Ref
July 1, 2017	Antoine Bibeau	San Jose Sharks	1-year, $650,000	
July 1, 2017	Brian Boyle	New Jersey Devils	2-year, $5.1 million	
July 1, 2017	Andrew Campbell	Arizona Coyotes	2-year, $300,000	
July 1, 2017	Seth Griffith	Buffalo Sabres	1-year, $650,000	
July 1, 2017	Matt Hunwick	Pittsburgh Penguins	3-year, $6.75 million	
July 1, 2017	Sergey Kalinin	SKA Saint Petersburg	3-year	
July 2, 2017	Steven Oleksy	Anaheim Ducks	2-year, $300,000	
August 15, 2017	Alexey Marchenko	CSKA Moscow	3-year	
October 19, 2017	Brooks Laich	Los Angeles Kings	1-year, $650,000	
June 15, 2018	Ben Smith	Adler Mannheim	3-year	
June 18, 2018	Colin Greening	Toronto Marlies	1-year	

=== Lost via expansion draft ===
Player	New team	Date picked in expansion draft	Ref
Brendan Leipsic	Vegas Golden Knights	June 21, 2017	

=== Player signings ===
Date	Player	Contract terms (in U.S. dollars)	Ref
June 29, 2017	Adam Brooks	3-year, $2.775 million entry-level contract	
June 30, 2017	Curtis McElhinney	2-year, $1.7 million	
June 30, 2017	Garret Sparks	2-year, $1.35 million	
July 1, 2017	Colin Greening	1-year, $750,000	
July 4, 2017	Justin Holl	1-year, $650,000	
July 5, 2017	Zach Hyman	4-year, $9 million	
July 12, 2017	Timothy Liljegren	3-year, $3.975 million entry-level contract	
August 27, 2017	Connor Brown	3-year, $6.3 million	
October 23, 2017	Roman Polak	1-year, $1.1 million	
November 17, 2017	Josh Leivo	1-year, $925,000 contract extension	
May 17, 2018	Pierre Engvall	2-year, entry-level contract	
May 17, 2018	Jesper Lindgren	3-year, entry-level contract	
May 29, 2018	Kasimir Kaskisuo	2-year, $1.35 million contract extension	
June 20, 2018	Connor Carrick	1-year, $1.3 million contract extension	
June 20, 2018	Calvin Pickard	1-year, $800,000 contract extension	

== Draft picks ==
Below are the Toronto Maple Leafs' selections at the 2017 NHL entry draft, which was held on June 23–24, 2017 at the United Center in Chicago, Illinois. The Leafs held on to five of their own seven picks, having traded away their second round pick to the Tampa Bay Lightning in exchange for Brian Boyle, and losing their third round pick as compensation for signing head coach Mike Babcock. They also acquired an additional two picks through various trades.

Round	#	Player	Pos	Nationality	College/Junior/Club team (League)
1	17	Timothy Liljegren	D	Sweden	Rögle BK (SHL)
2	59^{1}	Eemeli Rasanen	D	Finland	Kingston Frontenacs (OHL)
4	110	Ian Scott	G	Canada	Prince Albert Raiders (WHL)
4	124^{2}	Vladislav Kara	C	Russia	Irbis Kazan (MHL)
5	141	Fedor Gordeev	D	Canada	Flint Firebirds (OHL)
6	172	Ryan McGregor	C	Canada	Sarnia Sting (OHL)
7	203	Ryan O'Connell	D	Canada	St. Andrew's College (CISAA)

=== Draft notes ===
1. The Ottawa Senators' second-round pick went the Toronto Maple Leafs as the result of a trade on February 9, 2016, that sent Dion Phaneuf, Matt Frattin, Casey Bailey, Ryan Rupert and Cody Donaghey to Ottawa in exchange for Milan Michalek, Jared Cowen, Colin Greening, Tobias Lindberg and this pick.
2. The Pittsburgh Penguins' fourth-round pick went to the Toronto Maple Leafs as the result of a trade on March 1, 2017, that sent Frank Corrado to Pittsburgh in exchange for Eric Fehr, Steven Oleksy and this pick.
