= Roope Laavainen =

Finnish ice hockey player

- Born: 23 August 1998 (age 28) Helsinki, Finland
- Height: 6 ft 2 in (188 cm)
- Weight: 201 lb (91 kg; 14 st 5 lb)
- Position: Defence
- Shoots: Right
- Liiga team Former teams: HPK; Jukurit
- NHL draft: 119th overall, 2017; Chicago Blackhawks
- Playing career: 2017–present

Roope Laavainen (born 23 August 1998) is a Finnish professional ice hockey defenceman who is currently playing for HPK of the Finnish Liiga. He was selected by the Chicago Blackhawks in the fourth round, 119th overall, of the 2017 NHL entry draft.

== Playing career ==
Laavainen played as a youth with Jokerit's U20 team in the Jr. A, prior to his selection to the Blackhawks. He left the Jokerit organization to remain in Finland and sign a three-year contract with HPK of the Liiga on 28 April 2017.

During the 2018–19 season, Laavainen registered 2 points in 10 games with HPK before he was loaned for two months to fellow Liiga club, Mikkelin Jukurit, on 27 November 2018. Adding 1 assist in 5 games with Jukurit, Laavainen returned to HPK on 8 January 2019.

== Career statistics ==
			Regular season					Playoffs
Season	Team	League	GP	G	A	Pts	PIM	GP	G	A	Pts	PIM
2016–17	Jokerit	Jr. A	48	5	16	21	42	—	—	—	—	—
2017–18	HPK	Liiga	39	0	4	4	31	—	—	—	—	—
2017–18	LeKi	Mestis	15	1	1	2	4	5	1	2	3	2
2018–19	HPK	Jr. A	3	0	1	1	2	3	1	2	3	2
2018–19	HPK	Liiga	15	1	2	3	2	2	0	0	0	0
2018–19	TUTO Hockey	Mestis	5	1	0	1	2	—	—	—	—	—
2018–19	Jukurit	Liiga	5	0	1	1	4	—	—	—	—	—
2018–19	LeKi	Mestis	17	4	8	12	6	10	1	1	2	6
Liiga totals			59	1	7	8	37	2	0	0	0	0

== Awards & honors ==
Award	Year
Liiga
Champion (HPK)	2019
