= 2017–18 Vegas Golden Knights season =

American ice hockey team season

2017–18 Vegas Golden Knights
- Western Conference champions
- Pacific Division champions
- Division: 1st Pacific
- Conference: 3rd Western
- 2017–18 record: 51–24–7
- Home record: 29–10–2
- Road record: 22–14–5
- Goals for: 272
- Goals against: 228

Team information
- General manager: George McPhee
- Coach: Gerard Gallant
- Captain: Vacant
- Alternate captains: Pierre-Edouard Bellemare; Deryk Engelland; James Neal; David Perron; Luca Sbisa; Reilly Smith
- Arena: T-Mobile Arena
- Average attendance: 18,042
- Minor league affiliates: Chicago Wolves (AHL); Quad City Mallards (ECHL)

Team leaders
- Goals: William Karlsson (43)
- Assists: David Perron (50)
- Points: William Karlsson (78)
- Penalty minutes: Colin Miller (53)
- Plus/minus: William Karlsson (+49)
- Wins: Marc-Andre Fleury (29)
- Goals against average: Oscar Dansk (1.78)

The 2017–18 Vegas Golden Knights season was the inaugural season for the Vegas Golden Knights. They played their home games at T-Mobile Arena on the Las Vegas Strip in Paradise, Nevada.

The Golden Knights enjoyed the strongest debut season for an expansion team in North American professional sports history. On February 1, 2018, they broke the record for most wins by an expansion team in their first season when they earned their 34th win of the season. On February 21, they broke the record for most points by an expansion team in their inaugural season when they got their 84th point of the season. Then on March 26, they became the first team to make the playoffs in their inaugural season in the league since the Edmonton Oilers and Hartford Whalers in the 1979–80 season. Following that achievement, on March 31, 2018, with a 3–2 victory over the San Jose Sharks, the Knights became the first modern-era expansion team from any of the four major sports and the first NHL team since the 1926–27 New York Rangers to win their division in their inaugural season (excluding the 1967–68 Philadelphia Flyers, as all teams in the West Division that year were expansion teams). The Golden Knights finished the regular season with a .665 points percentage; prior to 2018 the only examples of first year expansion teams joining any of the North American major professional sports leagues after their respective league's first decade and finishing with a winning/points percentage of .500 or better were teams that had joined from another league.

Earning a playoff berth in their first season, the Golden Knights eliminated the Los Angeles Kings in four straight games during the first round, becoming the first team in NHL history to sweep their first playoff series in their inaugural season. They later defeated the San Jose Sharks in the second round in six games and advanced to the Western Conference Finals. There they defeated the Winnipeg Jets in five games to advance to the Stanley Cup Final in their inaugural season where they faced the Washington Capitals, and lost in five games.

== Standings ==
Pacific Division
Pos	Team	GP	W	L	OTL	ROW	GF	GA	GD	Pts
1	y – Vegas Golden Knights	82	51	24	7	47	272	228	+44	109
2	x – Anaheim Ducks	82	44	25	13	40	235	216	+19	101
3	x – San Jose Sharks	82	45	27	10	40	252	229	+23	100
4	x – Los Angeles Kings	82	45	29	8	43	239	203	+36	98
5	Calgary Flames	82	37	35	10	35	218	248	−30	84
6	Edmonton Oilers	82	36	40	6	31	234	263	−29	78
7	Vancouver Canucks	82	31	40	11	31	218	264	−46	73
8	Arizona Coyotes	82	29	41	12	27	208	256	−48	70

Source: National Hockey League
x – Clinched playoff spot; y – Clinched division

== Schedule and results ==
=== Preseason ===
A preliminary preseason schedule was announced in January 2017. The draft schedule was released in April 2017, while the final schedule was released in June 2017.

2017 preseason game log: 3–3–1 (Home: 0–2–1; Road: 3–1–0)
#	Date	Visitor	Score	Home	OT	Decision	Attendance	Record	Recap
1	September 17	Vegas	9–4	Vancouver		Ferguson	15,565	1–0–0	Recap
2	September 19	Vegas	4–1	Colorado		Lagace	—	2–0–0	Recap
3	September 21	Vegas	2–5	San Jose		Pickard	15,071	2–1–0	Recap
4	September 24	Vegas	4–2	Anaheim		Fleury	15,442	3–1–0	Recap
5	September 26	Los Angeles	3–2	Vegas	OT	Fleury	17,101	3–1–1	Recap
6	September 28	Colorado	4–2	Vegas		Fleury	15,337	3–2–1	Recap
7	October 1	San Jose	5–3	Vegas		Fleury	16,479	3–3–1	Recap

=== Regular season ===
The regular season schedule was released on June 22, 2017.

2017–18 game log

October: 8–3–0 (Home: 6–1–0; Road: 2–2–0)
#	Date	Visitor	Score	Home	OT	Decision	Attendance	Record	Pts	Recap
1	October 6	Vegas	2–1	Dallas		Fleury	18,532	1–0–0	2	Recap
2	October 7	Vegas	2–1	Arizona	OT	Fleury	17,125	2–0–0	4	Recap
3	October 10	Arizona	2–5	Vegas		Fleury	18,191	3–0–0	6	Recap
4	October 13	Detroit	6–3	Vegas		Fleury	17,645	3–1–0	6	Recap
5	October 15	Boston	1–3	Vegas		Subban	17,562	4–1–0	8	Recap
6	October 17	Buffalo	4–5	Vegas	OT	Subban	17,617	5–1–0	10	Recap
7	October 21	St. Louis	2–3	Vegas	OT	Dansk	17,883	6–1–0	12	Recap
8	October 24	Chicago	2–4	Vegas		Dansk	18,108	7–1–0	14	Recap
9	October 27	Colorado	0–7	Vegas		Dansk	17,702	8–1–0	16	Recap
10	October 30	Vegas	3–6	NY Islanders		Lagace	11,113	8–2–0	16	Recap
11	October 31	Vegas	4–6	NY Rangers		Lagace	17,294	8–3–0	16	Recap

November: 7–5–1 (Home: 3–1–0; Road: 3–4–1)
#	Date	Visitor	Score	Home	OT	Decision	Attendance	Record	Pts	Recap
12	November 2	Vegas	1–2	Boston		Lagace	17,565	8–4–0	16	Recap
13	November 4	Vegas	5–4	Ottawa		Lagace	16,824	9–4–0	18	Recap
14	November 6	Vegas	3–4	Toronto	SO	Lagace	19,398	9–4–1	19	Recap
15	November 7	Vegas	2–3	Montreal		Lagace	21,302	9–5–1	19	Recap
16	November 10	Winnipeg	2–5	Vegas		Lagace	18,110	10–5–1	21	Recap
17	November 14	Vegas	2–8	Edmonton		Lagace	18,347	10–6–1	21	Recap
18	November 16	Vegas	5–2	Vancouver		Lagace	18,119	11–6–1	23	Recap
19	November 19	Los Angeles	2–4	Vegas		Lagace	18,211	12–6–1	25	Recap
20	November 22	Vegas	4–2	Anaheim		Lagace	17,174	13–6–1	27	Recap
21	November 24	San Jose	4–5	Vegas	OT	Subban	18,094	14–6–1	29	Recap
22	November 25	Vegas	4–2	Arizona		Subban	13,226	15–6–1	31	Recap
23	November 28	Dallas	3–0	Vegas		Subban	17,579	15–7–1	31	Recap
24	November 30	Vegas	2–4	Minnesota		Subban	19,084	15–8–1	31	Recap

December: 11–1–1 (Home: 7–0–1; Road: 4–1–0)
#	Date	Visitor	Score	Home	OT	Decision	Attendance	Record	Pts	Recap
25	December 1	Vegas	4–7	Winnipeg		Lagace	15,321	15–9–1	31	Recap
26	December 3	Arizona	2–3	Vegas	OT	Subban	17,519	16–9–1	33	Recap
27	December 5	Anaheim	3–4	Vegas	SO	Subban	17,608	17–9–1	35	Recap
28	December 8	Vegas	4–3	Nashville	SO	Subban	17,125	18–9–1	37	Recap
29	December 9	Vegas	5–3	Dallas		Lagace	18,532	19–9–1	39	Recap
30	December 12	Carolina	3–2	Vegas	SO	Fleury	17,520	19–9–2	40	Recap
31	December 14	Pittsburgh	1–2	Vegas		Fleury	18,029	20–9–2	42	Recap
32	December 17	Florida	2–5	Vegas		Subban	17,593	21–9–2	44	Recap
33	December 19	Tampa Bay	3–4	Vegas		Fleury	17,813	22–9–2	46	Recap
34	December 23	Washington	0–3	Vegas		Fleury	18,025	23–9–2	48	Recap
35	December 27	Vegas	4–1	Anaheim		Subban	17,444	24–9–2	50	Recap
36	December 28	Vegas	3–2	Los Angeles	OT	Fleury	18,432	25–9–2	52	Recap
37	December 31	Toronto	3–6	Vegas		Subban	18,118	26–9–2	54	Recap

January: 7–3–2 (Home: 3–1–1; Road: 4–2–1)
#	Date	Visitor	Score	Home	OT	Decision	Attendance	Record	Pts	Recap
38	January 2	Nashville	0–3	Vegas		Fleury	18,171	27–9–2	56	Recap
39	January 4	Vegas	1–2	St. Louis		Fleury	18,976	27–10–2	56	Recap
40	January 5	Vegas	5–4	Chicago		Subban	21,933	28–10–2	58	Recap
41	January 7	NY Rangers	1–2	Vegas		Fleury	18,234	29–10–2	60	Recap
42	January 13	Edmonton	3–2	Vegas	OT	Fleury	18,351	29–10–3	61	Recap
43	January 16	Vegas	0–1	Nashville		Fleury	17,150	29–11–3	61	Recap
44	January 18	Vegas	4–1	Tampa Bay		Fleury	19,092	30–11–3	63	Recap
45	January 19	Vegas	3–4	Florida	OT	Subban	17,468	30–11–4	64	Recap
46	January 21	Vegas	5–1	Carolina		Fleury	15,303	31–11–4	66	Recap
47	January 23	Columbus	3–6	Vegas		Fleury	18,231	32–11–4	68	Recap
48	January 25	NY Islanders	2–1	Vegas		Fleury	18,184	32–12–4	68	Recap
49	January 30	Vegas	4–2	Calgary		Fleury	19,289	33–12–4	70	Recap

February: 8–5–1 (Home: 5–3–0; Road: 3–2–1)
#	Date	Visitor	Score	Home	OT	Decision	Attendance	Record	Pts	Recap
50	February 1	Vegas	3–2	Winnipeg	OT	Fleury	15,321	34–12–4	72	Recap
51	February 2	Vegas	2–5	Minnesota		Subban	19,057	34–13–4	72	Recap
52	February 4	Vegas	4–3	Washington		Fleury	18,506	35–13–4	74	Recap
53	February 6	Vegas	4–5	Pittsburgh		Fleury	18,644	35–14–4	74	Recap
54	February 8	Vegas	5–3	San Jose		Fleury	17,562	36–14–4	76	Recap
55	February 11	Philadelphia	4–1	Vegas		Fleury	18,220	36–15–4	76	Recap
56	February 13	Chicago	2–5	Vegas		Fleury	18,085	37–15–4	78	Recap
57	February 15	Edmonton	1–4	Vegas		Fleury	18,030	38–15–4	80	Recap
58	February 17	Montreal	3–6	Vegas		Fleury	18,122	39–15–4	82	Recap
59	February 19	Anaheim	2–0	Vegas		Fleury	18,267	39–16–4	82	Recap
60	February 21	Calgary	3–7	Vegas		Fleury	18,014	40–16–4	84	Recap
61	February 23	Vancouver	3–6	Vegas		Fleury	18,207	41–16–4	86	Recap
62	February 26	Vegas	2–3	Los Angeles	OT	Fleury	18,230	41–16–5	87	Recap
63	February 27	Los Angeles	4–1	Vegas		Lagace	18,328	41–17–5	87	Recap

March: 9–5–2 (Home: 5–4–0; Road: 4–1–2)
#	Date	Visitor	Score	Home	OT	Decision	Attendance	Record	Pts	Recap
64	March 2	Ottawa	5–4	Vegas		Fleury	18,269	41–18–5	87	Recap
65	March 4	Vegas	3–2	New Jersey		Fleury	16,514	42–18–5	89	Recap
66	March 6	Vegas	1–4	Columbus		Fleury	17,402	42–19–5	89	Recap
67	March 8	Vegas	4–0	Detroit		Fleury	19,515	43–19–5	91	Recap
68	March 10	Vegas	2–1	Buffalo	SO	Fleury	19,070	44–19–5	93	Recap
69	March 12	Vegas	3–2	Philadelphia		Fleury	19,723	45–19–5	95	Recap
70	March 14	New Jersey	8–3	Vegas		Fleury	18,420	45–20–5	95	Recap
71	March 16	Minnesota	4–2	Vegas		Fleury	18,295	45–21–5	95	Recap
72	March 18	Calgary	0–4	Vegas		Fleury	18,075	46–21–5	97	Recap
73	March 20	Vancouver	1–4	Vegas		Fleury	18,214	47–21–5	99	Recap
74	March 22	Vegas	1–2	San Jose	OT	Subban	17,562	47–21–6	100	Recap
75	March 24	Vegas	1–2	Colorado	SO	Fleury	18,042	47–21–7	101	Recap
76	March 26	Colorado	1–4	Vegas		Fleury	18,326	48–21–7	103	Recap
77	March 28	Arizona	3–2	Vegas		Fleury	18,121	48–22–7	103	Recap
78	March 30	St. Louis	3–4	Vegas	OT	Subban	18,191	49–22–7	105	Recap
79	March 31	San Jose	2–3	Vegas		Fleury	18,458	50–22–7	107	Recap

April: 1–2–0 (Home: 0–0–0; Road: 1–2–0)
#	Date	Visitor	Score	Home	OT	Decision	Attendance	Record	Pts	Recap
80	April 3	Vegas	5–4	Vancouver	SO	Subban	18,865	51–22–7	109	Recap
81	April 5	Vegas	3–4	Edmonton		Subban	18,347	51–23–7	109	Recap
82	April 7	Vegas	1–7	Calgary		Fleury	19,289	51–24–7	109	Recap

Legend: Win (2 points) Loss (0 points) Overtime/shootout loss (1 point)

=== Playoffs ===
2018 Stanley Cup playoffs

Western Conference First Round vs. (WC1) Los Angeles Kings: Vegas won 4–0
#	Date	Visitor	Score	Home	OT	Decision	Attendance	Series	Recap
1	April 11	Los Angeles	0–1	Vegas		Fleury	18,479	1–0	Recap
2	April 13	Los Angeles	1–2	Vegas	2OT	Fleury	18,588	2–0	Recap
3	April 15	Vegas	3–2	Los Angeles		Fleury	18,484	3–0	Recap
4	April 17	Vegas	1–0	Los Angeles		Fleury	18,422	4–0	Recap

Western Conference Second Round vs. (P3) San Jose Sharks: Vegas won 4–2
#	Date	Visitor	Score	Home	OT	Decision	Attendance	Series	Recap
1	April 26	San Jose	0–7	Vegas		Fleury	18,444	1–0	Recap
2	April 28	San Jose	4–3	Vegas	2OT	Fleury	18,671	1–1	Recap
3	April 30	Vegas	4–3	San Jose	OT	Fleury	17,562	2–1	Recap
4	May 2	Vegas	0–4	San Jose		Fleury	17,562	2–2	Recap
5	May 4	San Jose	3–5	Vegas		Fleury	18,693	3–2	Recap
6	May 6	Vegas	3–0	San Jose		Fleury	17,562	4–2	Recap

Western Conference Finals vs. (C2) Winnipeg Jets: Vegas won 4–1
#	Date	Visitor	Score	Home	OT	Decision	Attendance	Series	Recap
1	May 12	Vegas	2–4	Winnipeg		Fleury	15,321	0–1	Recap
2	May 14	Vegas	3–1	Winnipeg		Fleury	15,321	1–1	Recap
3	May 16	Winnipeg	2–4	Vegas		Fleury	18,477	2–1	Recap
4	May 18	Winnipeg	2–3	Vegas		Fleury	18,697	3–1	Recap
5	May 20	Vegas	2–1	Winnipeg		Fleury	15,321	4–1	Recap

Stanley Cup Final vs. (M1) Washington Capitals: Washington won 4–1
#	Date	Visitor	Score	Home	OT	Decision	Attendance	Series	Recap
1	May 28	Washington	4–6	Vegas		Fleury	18,575	1–0	Recap
2	May 30	Washington	3–2	Vegas		Fleury	18,702	1–1	Recap
3	June 2	Vegas	1–3	Washington		Fleury	18,506	1–2	Recap
4	June 4	Vegas	2–6	Washington		Fleury	18,506	1–3	Recap
5	June 7	Washington	4–3	Vegas		Fleury	18,529	1–4	Recap

Legend: Win Loss

== Player statistics ==
Final stats

=== Skaters ===
Regular season
Player	GP	G	A	Pts	+/−	PIM
William Karlsson	82	43	35	78	49	12
Jonathan Marchessault	77	27	48	75	36	40
David Perron	70	16	50	66	1	50
Reilly Smith	67	22	38	60	31	24
Erik Haula	76	29	26	55	−16	37
James Neal	71	25	19	44	−11	24
Colin Miller	82	10	31	41	−4	53
Alex Tuch	78	15	22	37	3	27
Nate Schmidt	76	5	31	36	19	16
Shea Theodore	61	6	23	29	5	14
Cody Eakin	80	11	16	27	−6	22
Deryk Engelland	79	5	18	23	6	24
Brad Hunt	45	3	15	18	−5	6
Pierre-Edouard Bellemare	72	6	10	16	5	14
Tomas Nosek	67	7	8	15	6	14
Brayden McNabb	76	5	10	15	26	52
Ryan Carpenter^{†}	36	9	5	14	0	9
Luca Sbisa	30	2	12	14	8	15
Brendan Leipsic^{‡}	44	2	11	13	−1	4
Oscar Lindberg	63	9	2	11	−11	14
Tomas Tatar^{†}	20	4	2	6	−11	10
Brandon Pirri	2	3	0	3	3	0
William Carrier	37	1	2	3	−3	19
Tomas Hyka	10	1	2	3	2	0
Jon Merrill	34	1	2	3	7	22
Ryan Reaves^{†}	21	0	2	2	2	10
Vadim Shipachyov	3	1	0	1	3	2
Jason Garrison	8	0	1	1	−2	4
Stefan Matteau	8	0	1	1	0	0
Zach Whitecloud	1	0	0	0	3	0

Playoffs
Player	GP	G	A	Pts	+/-	PIM
Reilly Smith	20	5	17	22	5	10
Jonathan Marchessault	20	8	13	21	8	10
William Karlsson	20	7	8	15	8	2
James Neal	20	6	5	11	0	12
Alex Tuch	20	6	4	10	0	12
Shea Theodore	20	3	7	10	2	8
Erik Haula	20	3	6	9	−3	27
David Perron	15	1	8	9	1	10
Nate Schmidt	20	3	4	7	7	4
Colin Miller	20	3	4	7	5	14
Tomas Nosek	17	4	2	6	5	8
Brayden McNabb	20	2	3	5	2	20
Ryan Carpenter	17	0	5	5	5	6
Cody Eakin	20	3	1	4	3	4
Luca Sbisa	12	0	4	4	5	8
Pierre-Edouard Bellemare	20	0	3	3	6	14
Ryan Reaves	10	2	0	2	4	18
Tomas Tatar	8	1	1	2	1	2
Deryk Engelland	20	0	2	2	2	26
Oscar Lindberg	3	0	1	1	1	2
William Carrier	10	0	0	0	−1	8
Jon Merrill	8	0	0	0	2	10

=== Goaltenders ===
Regular season
Player	GP	GS	TOI	W	L	OT	GA	GAA	SA	SV%	SO	G	A	PIM
Marc-Andre Fleury	46	46	2,673:24	29	13	4	100	2.24	1376	.927	4	0	1	6
Malcolm Subban	22	19	1,230:11	13	4	2	55	2.68	614	.910	0	0	0	2
Maxime Lagace	16	14	873:31	6	7	1	57	3.92	430	.867	0	0	0	0
Oscar Dansk	4	3	168:36	3	0	0	5	1.78	93	.946	1	0	0	0
Dylan Ferguson	1	0	9:14	0	0	0	1	6.50	2	.500	0	0	0	0

Playoffs
Player	GP	GS	TOI	W	L	GA	GAA	SA	SV%	SO	G	A	PIM
Marc-Andre Fleury	20	20	1,258:35	13	7	47	2.24	641	.927	4	0	1	4

== Awards and honours ==
=== Milestones ===
Regular season
Player	Milestone	Reached
Alex Tuch	1st career goal 1st career assist 1st career point	October 15, 2017
Malcolm Subban	1st career win	October 15, 2017
Vadim Shipachyov	1st career game 1st career goal 1st career point	October 15, 2017
Oscar Dansk	1st career game 1st career win	October 21, 2017
Tomas Nosek	1st career assist	October 24, 2017
Oscar Dansk	1st career shutout	October 27, 2017
Maxime Lagace	1st career game	October 30, 2017
Maxime Lagace	1st career win	November 4, 2017
Reilly Smith	200th career point	November 10, 2017
William Karlsson	200th career game	November 14, 2017
Dylan Ferguson	1st career game	November 14, 2017
Erik Haula	100th career point	November 16, 2017
Cody Eakin	400th career game	November 24, 2017
David Perron	400th career point	December 9, 2017
Deryk Engelland	500th career game	December 17, 2017
Jonathan Marchessault	100th career point	December 19, 2017
Cody Eakin	100th career assist	December 23, 2017
Reilly Smith	400th career game	December 27, 2017
Erik Haula	300th career game	January 2, 2018
Deryk Engelland	100th career point	January 18, 2018
David Perron	700th career game	February 8, 2018
William Karlsson	100th career point	February 15, 2018
Tomas Hyka	1st career game	February 19, 2018
Tomas Hyka	1st career goal 1st career point	February 23, 2018
Luca Sbisa	100th career point	February 26, 2018
Tomas Hyka	1st career assist	March 4, 2018
Shea Theodore	100th career game	March 12, 2018
Pierre-Edouard Bellemare	300th career game	March 20, 2018
Jonathan Marchessault	200th career game	March 31, 2018
James Neal	700th career game	March 31, 2018
Brandon Pirri	100th career point	April 3, 2018
Zach Whitecloud	1st career game	April 5, 2018
Brayden McNabb	300th career game	April 12, 2018
Marc-Andre Fleury	400th career win	April 15, 2018

Playoffs
Player	Milestone	Reached
Ryan Carpenter	1st career playoff game	April 11, 2018
William Carrier	1st career playoff game	April 11, 2018
Jon Merrill	1st career playoff game	April 11, 2018
Alex Tuch	1st career playoff game	April 11, 2018
Tomas Nosek	1st career playoff game 1st career playoff assist 1st career playoff point	April 11, 2018
Alex Tuch	1st career playoff goal 1st career playoff point	April 13, 2018
Ryan Carpenter	1st career playoff assist 1st career playoff point	April 15, 2018
Alex Tuch	1st career playoff assist	April 15, 2018
Brayden McNabb	1st career playoff goal 1st career playoff point	April 17, 2018
Brayden McNabb	1st career playoff assist	April 26, 2018
Jonathan Marchessault	1st career playoff goal	April 26, 2018

== Transactions ==
The Golden Knights have been involved in the following transactions during the 2017–18 season.

=== Trades ===
Date	Details		Ref
June 21, 2017	To Florida Panthers 4th-round pick in 2018	To Vegas Golden Knights Reilly Smith
June 21, 2017	To Buffalo Sabres Expansion Draft considerations	To Vegas Golden Knights 6th-round pick in 2017
June 21, 2017	To Carolina Hurricanes Expansion Draft considerations	To Vegas Golden Knights BOS's 5th-round pick in 2017
June 21, 2017	To Tampa Bay Lightning Expansion Draft considerations	To Vegas Golden Knights Nikita Gusev; 2nd-round pick in 2017; PIT's 4th-round pick in 2018
June 21, 2017	To New York Islanders Expansion Draft considerations	To Vegas Golden Knights Mikhail Grabovski; Jake Bischoff; 1st-round pick in 2017; 2nd-round pick in 2019
June 21, 2017	To Anaheim Ducks Expansion Draft considerations	To Vegas Golden Knights Shea Theodore
June 21, 2017	To Columbus Blue Jackets Expansion Draft considerations	To Vegas Golden Knights David Clarkson; 1st-round pick in 2017; 2nd-round pick in 2019
June 21, 2017	To Winnipeg Jets CBJ's 1st-round pick in 2017; Expansion Draft considerations	To Vegas Golden Knights 1st-round pick in 2017; 3rd-round pick in 2019
June 21, 2017	To Minnesota Wild 3rd-round pick in 2017 or 2018	To Vegas Golden Knights Alex Tuch
June 21, 2017	To Pittsburgh Penguins Expansion Draft considerations	To Vegas Golden Knights 2nd-round pick in 2020
June 22, 2017	To Carolina Hurricanes Trevor van Riemsdyk; 7th-round pick in 2018	To Vegas Golden Knights PIT's 2nd-round pick in 2017
June 22, 2017	To Montreal Canadiens David Schlemko	To Vegas Golden Knights 5th-round pick in 2019
June 24, 2017	To Columbus Blue Jackets TBL's 2nd-round pick in 2017	To Vegas Golden Knights Keegan Kolesar
June 26, 2017	To Dallas Stars Marc Methot	To Vegas Golden Knights Dylan Ferguson; 2nd-round pick in 2020
July 1, 2017	To Nashville Predators Alexei Emelin	To Vegas Golden Knights 3rd-round pick in 2019
July 2, 2017	To Chicago Blackhawks Future considerations	To Vegas Golden Knights Marcus Kruger
July 4, 2017	To Carolina Hurricanes Marcus Kruger	To Vegas Golden Knights 5th-round pick in 2018
October 6, 2017	To Toronto Maple Leafs Calvin Pickard	To Vegas Golden Knights Tobias Lindberg; 6th-round pick in 2018
February 5, 2018	To Los Angeles Kings Future considerations	To Vegas Golden Knights Zachary Leslie
February 23, 2018	To Pittsburgh Penguins Tobias Lindberg	To Vegas Golden Knights Ryan Reaves; VAN's 4th-round pick in 2018
February 26, 2018	To Vancouver Canucks Brendan Leipsic	To Vegas Golden Knights Philip Holm
February 26, 2018	To Detroit Red Wings 1st-round pick in 2018; NYI's 2nd-round pick in 2019; 3rd-round pick in 2021	To Vegas Golden Knights Tomas Tatar

=== Free agents acquired ===
Date	Player	Former team	Contract terms (in U.S. dollars)	Ref
March 6, 2017	Reid Duke	Brandon Wheat Kings (WHL)	3-year, $2.775 million	
May 4, 2017	Vadim Shipachyov	SKA Saint Petersburg (KHL)	2-year, $9 million	
June 1, 2017	Tomas Hyka	BK Mladá Boleslav (ELH)	1-year, $710,000 entry-level contract	
July 1, 2017	Chris Casto	Boston Bruins	1-year, $650,000	
July 1, 2017	Brad Hunt	Nashville Predators	2-year, $1.3 million	
July 1, 2017	Maxime Lagace	Dallas Stars	1-year, $650,000	
July 1, 2017	Stefan Matteau	Montreal Canadiens	1-year, $650,000	
July 1, 2017	Paul Thompson	Florida Panthers	1-year, $650,000	
July 1, 2017	T. J. Tynan	Columbus Blue Jackets	2-year, $1.3 million	
July 3, 2017	Oscar Dansk	Columbus Blue Jackets	1-year, $650,000	
September 20, 2017	Dylan Coghlan	Tri-City Americans (WHL)	3-year, $2.195 million entry-level contract	
October 4, 2017	Brandon Pirri	New York Rangers	1-year, $650,000	
March 8, 2018	Zach Whitecloud	Bemidji State University (NCAA)	3-year, $4.475 million entry-level contract	
June 1, 2018	Gage Quinney	Wilkes-Barre/Scranton Penguins (AHL)	2-year, $1.43 million entry-level contract	
June 12, 2018	Brooks Macek	EHC Red Bull München (DEL)	1-year, $650,000	

=== Free agents lost ===
Date	Player	New team	Contract terms (in U.S. dollars)	Ref
July 1, 2017	Jean-Francois Berube	Chicago Blackhawks	2-year, $1.5 million	
July 1, 2017	Connor Brickley	Florida Panthers	1-year, $750,000	
July 1, 2017	Chris Thorburn	St. Louis Blues	2-year, $1.8 million	

=== Claimed via waivers ===
Player	Previous team	Date	Ref
Malcolm Subban	Boston Bruins	October 3, 2017	
Ryan Carpenter	San Jose Sharks	December 13, 2017	

=== Lost via waivers ===
Player	New team	Date	Ref

=== Lost via retirement ===
Date	Player	Ref
November 9, 2017	Vadim Shipachyov	

=== Player signings ===
Date	Player	Contract terms (in U.S. dollars)	Ref
June 21, 2017	Deryk Engelland	1-year, $1 million	
June 21, 2017	Erik Haula	3-year, $8.25 million	
July 4, 2017	Oscar Lindberg	2-year, $3.4 million	
July 6, 2017	Teemu Pulkkinen	1-year, $700,000	
July 15, 2017	Erik Brannstrom	3-year, $4.125 million entry-level contract	
July 15, 2017	Cody Glass	3-year, $5.325 million entry-level contract	
July 15, 2017	Brendan Leipsic	2-year, $1.3 million	
July 15, 2017	Griffin Reinhart	2-year, $1.6 million	
July 15, 2017	Nick Suzuki	3-year, $4.6265 million entry-level contract	
August 5, 2017	Nate Schmidt	2-year, $4.45 million	
September 28, 2017	Dylan Ferguson	3-year, $2.15 million entry-level contract	
September 29, 2017	Nicolas Hague	3-year, $2.775 million entry-level contract	
November 29, 2017	Brayden McNabb	4-year, $10 million contract extension	
January 3, 2018	Jonathan Marchessault	6-year, $30 million contract extension	
January 15, 2018	Deryk Engelland	1-year, $1.5 million contract extension	
January 16, 2018	Jon Merrill	2-year, $2.75 million contract extension	
May 31, 2018	Tomas Hyka	1-year, $650,000 contract extension	
May 31, 2018	Zachary Leslie	1-year, $675,000 contract extension	
June 1, 2018	Ben Jones	3-year, $2.245 million entry-level contract	
June 1, 2018	Jake Leschyshyn	3-year, $2.775 million entry-level contract	
June 11, 2018	Stefan Matteau	1-year, $650,000 contract extension	
June 15, 2018	Lucas Elvenes	3-year, entry-level contract	

== Draft picks ==
=== Expansion draft ===
The team filled its initial roster by selecting players in the 2017 NHL expansion draft on June 21, 2017. They were required to select or sign one player, who was not protected, from each existing team. In return for not selecting certain unprotected players, Vegas made several deals to grant concessions with some teams.

#	Player	Drafted from	Notes
1.	Calvin Pickard (G)	Colorado Avalanche	Traded to Toronto on October 6, 2017.
2.	Luca Sbisa (D)	Vancouver Canucks	
3.	Teemu Pulkkinen (LW)	Arizona Coyotes	
4.	Jon Merrill (D)	New Jersey Devils	
5.	William Carrier (LW)	Buffalo Sabres	Sabres traded their sixth-round pick in the 2017 NHL entry draft in exchange for Vegas selecting Carrier instead of Linus Ullmark.
6.	Cody Eakin (C)	Dallas Stars	
7.	Tomas Nosek (LW)	Detroit Red Wings	
8.	Jonathan Marchessault (C)	Florida Panthers	Panthers traded Reilly Smith in exchange for Vegas selecting Marchessault and a fourth-round pick in the 2018 NHL entry draft.
9.	Brayden McNabb (D)	Los Angeles Kings	
10.	Connor Brickley (C)	Carolina Hurricanes	Hurricanes traded Boston's fifth-round pick in the 2017 NHL Entry Draft (previously acquired) in exchange for Vegas selecting Brickley. Brickley was a pending unrestricted free agent and signed with the Panthers on July 1.
11.	Chris Thorburn (RW)	Winnipeg Jets	Jets traded their first-round pick in the 2017 NHL Entry Draft and a third-round pick in the 2019 NHL entry draft in exchange for Vegas selecting Thorburn and Columbus' first-round pick in the 2017 NHL Entry Draft (previously acquired). Thorburn was a pending unrestricted free agent and signed with the Blues on July 1.
12.	Pierre-Edouard Bellemare (RW)	Philadelphia Flyers	
13.	Jason Garrison (D)	Tampa Bay Lightning	Lightning traded their second-round pick in the 2017 NHL Entry Draft, Pittsburgh's fourth-round pick in the 2019 NHL Entry Draft (previously acquired) and Nikita Gusev in exchange for Vegas selecting Garrison.
14.	Jean-Francois Berube (G)	New York Islanders	Islanders traded their first-round pick in the 2017 NHL Entry Draft, a second-round pick in the 2019 NHL Entry Draft, Mikhail Grabovski and Jake Bischoff in exchange for Vegas selecting Berube. Berube was a pending unrestricted free agent and would sign with the Blackhawks on July 1.
15.	James Neal (LW)	Nashville Predators	
16.	Deryk Engelland (D)	Calgary Flames	Engelland was a pending unrestricted free agent. As a Las Vegas resident, he signed a one-year deal before free agency.
17.	Brendan Leipsic (LW)	Toronto Maple Leafs	
18.	Colin Miller (D)	Boston Bruins	
19.	Marc Methot (D)	Ottawa Senators	Traded to Dallas on June 26, 2017.
20.	David Schlemko (D)	San Jose Sharks	Traded to Montreal on June 22, 2017.
21.	David Perron (LW)	St. Louis Blues	
22.	Oscar Lindberg (C)	New York Rangers	
23.	Griffin Reinhart (D)	Edmonton Oilers	
24.	Alexei Emelin (D)	Montreal Canadiens	Traded to Nashville on July 1, 2017.
25.	Clayton Stoner (D)	Anaheim Ducks	Ducks traded Shea Theodore in exchange for Vegas selecting Stoner.
26.	Erik Haula (C)	Minnesota Wild	Wild traded Alex Tuch in exchange for Vegas selecting Haula and a conditional third-round pick in the 2017 or 2018 NHL Entry Draft.
27.	William Karlsson (C)	Columbus Blue Jackets	Blue Jackets traded their first-round pick in the 2017 NHL Entry Draft, a second-round pick in the 2019 NHL entry draft and David Clarkson in exchange for Vegas selecting Karlsson.
28.	Trevor van Riemsdyk (D)	Chicago Blackhawks	Traded to Carolina on June 22, 2017.
29.	Marc-Andre Fleury (G)	Pittsburgh Penguins	Penguins traded their second-round pick in the 2020 NHL entry draft in exchange for Vegas selecting Fleury.
30.	Nate Schmidt (D)	Washington Capitals	

=== Entry draft ===
Before the draft lottery, the Golden Knights were given the same odds as the team with the third worst point total from the 2016–17 season, which meant that they would not draft any lower than sixth overall and would draft third in each subsequent round. On April 30, 2017, the Golden Knights received a sixth overall pick in the 2017 NHL entry draft during the draft lottery.

Below are the Vegas Golden Knights' selections at the 2017 NHL entry draft, which was held on June 23 and 24, 2017, at the United Center in Chicago.

Round	#	Player	Pos	Nationality	College/Junior/Club team (League)
1	6	Cody Glass	C	Canada	Portland Winterhawks (WHL)
1	13^{1}	Nick Suzuki	C	Canada	Owen Sound Attack (OHL)
1	15^{2}	Erik Brannstrom	D	Sweden	HV71 (SHL)
2	34	Nicolas Hague	D	Canada	Mississauga Steelheads (OHL)
2	62^{3}	Jake Leschyshyn	C	Canada	Regina Pats (WHL)
3	65	Jonas Rondbjerg	RW	Denmark	Växjö Lakers (J20 SuperElit)
4	96	Maxim Zhukov	G	Russia	Green Bay Gamblers (USHL)
5	127	Lucas Elvenes	C	Sweden	Rögle BK (J20 SuperElit)
5	142^{4}	Jonathan Dugan	LW	United States	Northwood School (USHS)
6	158	Nick Campoli	C	Canada	North York Rangers (OJHL)
6	161^{5}	Jiri Patera	G	Czech Republic	Motor České Budějovice (Czech 1.liga)
7	189	Ben Jones	C	Canada	Niagara IceDogs (OHL)

Notes:

1. The Winnipeg Jets' first-round pick went to the Vegas Golden Knights as the result of a trade on June 21, 2017, that sent Columbus' first-round pick in 2017 to Winnipeg in exchange for Vegas selecting Chris Thorburn in the 2017 NHL expansion draft from Winnipeg, a third-round pick in 2019 and this pick.
2. The New York Islanders' first-round pick went to the Vegas Golden Knights as the result of a trade on June 21, 2017, that ensured that Vegas selected Jean-Francois Berube in the 2017 NHL expansion draft from the Islanders in exchange for Mikhail Grabovski, Jake Bischoff, a second-round pick in 2019 and this pick.
3. The Pittsburgh Penguins' second-round pick went to the Vegas Golden Knights as the result of a trade on June 22, 2017, that sent Trevor van Riemsdyk and a seventh-round pick in 2018 to Carolina in exchange for this pick.
4. The Boston Bruins' fifth-round pick went to the Vegas Golden Knights as the result of a trade on June 21, 2017, that ensured that Vegas selected Connor Brickley in the 2017 NHL expansion draft from Carolina in exchange for this pick.
5. The Buffalo Sabres' sixth-round pick went to the Vegas Golden Knights as the result of a trade on June 21, 2017, that ensured that Vegas selected William Carrier in the 2017 NHL expansion draft from Buffalo in exchange for this pick.
