= 2017–18 Dallas Stars season =

National Hockey League team season

2017–18 Dallas Stars
- Division: 6th Central
- Conference: 10th Western
- 2017–18 record: 42–32–8
- Home record: 26–12–3
- Road record: 16–20–5
- Goals for: 235
- Goals against: 225

Team information
- General manager: Jim Nill
- Coach: Ken Hitchcock
- Captain: Jamie Benn
- Alternate captains: John Klingberg; Alexander Radulov; Tyler Seguin; Jason Spezza
- Arena: American Airlines Center
- Average attendance: 18,110
- Minor league affiliates: Texas Stars (AHL); Idaho Steelheads (ECHL)

Team leaders
- Goals: Tyler Seguin (40)
- Assists: John Klingberg (59)
- Points: Jamie Benn (79)
- Penalty minutes: Antoine Roussel (126)
- Plus/minus: Radek Faksa (+21)
- Wins: Ben Bishop (26)
- Goals against average: Ben Bishop (2.49)

The 2017–18 Dallas Stars season was the 51st season for the National Hockey League (NHL) franchise that was established on June 5, 1967, and 25th season since the franchise relocated from Minnesota prior to the start of the 1993–94 NHL season. The Stars failed to qualify for the playoffs for the second straight year despite having a winning record and only missing the last playoff spot by three points. It was the tenth time that the Stars missed the playoffs since moving to Dallas in 1993, which was more than the franchise had missed back when the franchise was based in Minnesota, nine (missed playoffs in 1969, 1974, 1975, 1976, 1978, 1979, 1987, 1988, and 1993).

== Standings ==
Central Division
Pos	Team	GP	W	L	OTL	ROW	GF	GA	GD	Pts
1	p – Nashville Predators	82	53	18	11	47	267	211	+56	117
2	x – Winnipeg Jets	82	52	20	10	48	277	218	+59	114
3	x – Minnesota Wild	82	45	26	11	42	253	232	+21	101
4	x – Colorado Avalanche	82	43	30	9	41	257	237	+20	95
5	St. Louis Blues	82	44	32	6	41	226	222	+4	94
6	Dallas Stars	82	42	32	8	38	235	225	+10	92
7	Chicago Blackhawks	82	33	39	10	32	229	256	−27	76

Source: National Hockey League
p – Clinched Presidents' Trophy; x – Clinched playoff spot

Western Conference Wild Card
Pos	Div	Team	GP	W	L	OTL	ROW	GF	GA	GD	Pts
1	PA	x – Los Angeles Kings	82	45	29	8	43	239	203	+36	98
2	CE	x – Colorado Avalanche	82	43	30	9	41	257	237	+20	95
3	CE	St. Louis Blues	82	44	32	6	41	226	222	+4	94
4	CE	Dallas Stars	82	42	32	8	38	235	225	+10	92
5	PA	Calgary Flames	82	37	35	10	35	218	248	−30	84
6	PA	Edmonton Oilers	82	36	40	6	31	234	263	−29	78
7	CE	Chicago Blackhawks	82	33	39	10	32	229	256	−27	76
8	PA	Vancouver Canucks	82	31	40	11	31	218	264	−46	73
9	PA	Arizona Coyotes	82	29	41	12	27	208	256	−48	70

Source: National Hockey League
x – Clinched playoff spot

== Schedule and results ==
=== Preseason ===
The Stars released their preseason schedule on June 9, 2017.

2017 preseason game log: 3–3–0 (Home: 2–1–0; Road: 1–2–0)
#	Date	Visitor	Score	Home	OT	Decision	Attendance	Record	Recap
1	September 19	St. Louis	3–5	Dallas		McKenna	12,567	1–0–0	Recap
2	September 21	Dallas	1–5	Colorado		Lehtonen	—	1–1–0	Recap
3	September 23	Dallas	4–0	St. Louis		Lehtonen	15,742	2–1–0	Recap
4	September 25	Colorado	4–2	Dallas		Bishop	10,200	2–2–0	Recap
5	September 26	Minnesota	1–4	Dallas		Lehtonen	11,373	3–2–0	Recap
6	September 30	Dallas	1–5	Minnesota		Bishop	18,374	3–3–0	Recap

=== Regular season ===
The Stars' regular season schedule was published on June 22, 2017.

2017–18 game log

October: 7–5–0 (Home: 4–1–0; Road: 3–4–0)
#	Date	Visitor	Score	Home	OT	Decision	Attendance	Record	Pts	Recap
1	October 6	Vegas	2–1	Dallas		Lehtonen	18,532	0–1–0	0	Recap
2	October 7	Dallas	2–4	St. Louis		Lehtonen	18,858	0–2–0	0	Recap
3	October 10	Detroit	2–4	Dallas		Bishop	18,119	1–2–0	2	Recap
4	October 12	Dallas	1–4	Nashville		Bishop	17,113	1–3–0	2	Recap
5	October 14	Colorado	1–3	Dallas		Bishop	17,967	2–3–0	4	Recap
6	October 17	Arizona	1–3	Dallas		Bishop	16,007	3–3–0	6	Recap
7	October 19	Dallas	5–4	Arizona		Bishop	11,225	4–3–0	8	Recap
8	October 21	Carolina	3–4	Dallas		Bishop	18,023	5–3–0	10	Recap
9	October 24	Dallas	3–5	Colorado		Lehtonen	12,823	5–4–0	10	Recap
10	October 26	Dallas	4–5	Edmonton		Bishop	18,347	5–5–0	10	Recap
11	October 27	Dallas	2–1	Calgary		Lehtonen	18,873	6–5–0	12	Recap
12	October 30	Dallas	2–1	Vancouver	OT	Bishop	17,109	7–5–0	14	Recap

November: 7–5–1 (Home: 5–1–0; Road: 2–4–1)
#	Date	Visitor	Score	Home	OT	Decision	Attendance	Record	Pts	Recap
13	November 2	Dallas	2–5	Winnipeg		Bishop	15,321	7–6–0	14	Recap
14	November 4	Buffalo	1–5	Dallas		Lehtonen	18,236	8–6–0	16	Recap
15	November 6	Winnipeg	4–1	Dallas		Bishop	17,895	8–7–0	16	Recap
16	November 10	NY Islanders	0–5	Dallas		Bishop	18,342	9–7–0	18	Recap
17	November 13	Dallas	1–5	Carolina		Bishop	7,968	9–8–0	18	Recap
18	November 14	Dallas	3–4	Florida	SO	Lehtonen	10,928	9–8–1	19	Recap
19	November 16	Dallas	1–6	Tampa Bay		Bishop	19,092	9–9–1	19	Recap
20	November 18	Edmonton	3–6	Dallas		Bishop	18,312	10–9–1	21	Recap
21	November 21	Montreal	1–3	Dallas		Bishop	18,532	11–9–1	23	Recap
22	November 22	Dallas	0–3	Colorado		Bishop	14,874	11–10–1	23	Recap
23	November 24	Calgary	4–6	Dallas		Bishop	18,532	12–10–1	25	Recap
24	November 28	Dallas	3–0	Vegas		Bishop	17,579	13–10–1	27	Recap
25	November 30	Dallas	4–3	Chicago	OT	Bishop	21,589	14–10–1	29	Recap

December: 8–5–2 (Home: 5–2–1; Road: 3–3–1)
#	Date	Visitor	Score	Home	OT	Decision	Attendance	Record	Pts	Recap
26	December 2	Chicago	2–3	Dallas	SO	Bishop	18,532	15–10–1	31	Recap
27	December 3	Dallas	7–2	Colorado		Lehtonen	13,194	16–10–1	33	Recap
28	December 5	Nashville	5–2	Dallas		Bishop	18,023	16–11–1	33	Recap
29	December 7	Dallas	0–3	St. Louis		Lehtonen	16,341	16–12–1	33	Recap
30	December 9	Vegas	5–3	Dallas		Bishop	18,532	16–13–1	33	Recap
31	December 11	Dallas	2–1	NY Rangers	SO	Lehtonen	17,667	17–13–1	35	Recap
32	December 13	Dallas	5–2	NY Islanders		Lehtonen	10,316	18–13–1	37	Recap
33	December 15	Dallas	2–5	New Jersey		Lehtonen	13,171	18–14–1	37	Recap
34	December 16	Dallas	1–2	Philadelphia	OT	Bishop	19,477	18–14–2	38	Recap
35	December 19	Washington	4–3	Dallas	OT	Bishop	18,112	18–14–3	39	Recap
36	December 21	Chicago	0–4	Dallas		Bishop	18,532	19–14–3	41	Recap
37	December 23	Nashville	3–4	Dallas	SO	Bishop	18,532	20–14–3	43	Recap
38	December 27	Dallas	2–4	Minnesota		Bishop	19,107	20–15–3	43	Recap
39	December 29	St. Louis	2–4	Dallas		Bishop	18,532	21–15–3	45	Recap
40	December 31	San Jose	0–6	Dallas		Bishop	18,532	22–15–3	47	Recap

January: 6–4–1 (Home: 3–4–0; Road: 3–0–1)
#	Date	Visitor	Score	Home	OT	Decision	Attendance	Record	Pts	Recap
41	January 2	Columbus	2–1	Dallas		Bishop	17,235	22–16–3	47	Recap
42	January 4	New Jersey	3–4	Dallas		Bishop	18,114	23–16–3	49	Recap
43	January 6	Edmonton	1–5	Dallas		Bishop	18,532	24–16–3	51	Recap
44	January 13	Colorado	4–1	Dallas		Bishop	18,532	24–17–3	51	Recap
45	January 15	Dallas	3–2	Boston	OT	Lehtonen	17,565	25–17–3	53	Recap
46	January 16	Dallas	4–2	Detroit		Bishop	19,515	26–17–3	55	Recap
47	January 18	Dallas	1–2	Columbus	SO	Bishop	17,574	26–17–4	56	Recap
48	January 20	Dallas	7–1	Buffalo		Lehtonen	19,070	27–17–4	58	Recap
49	January 23	Florida	1–6	Dallas		Bishop	17,987	28–17–4	60	Recap
50	January 25	Toronto	4–1	Dallas		Bishop	18,225	28–18–4	60	Recap
51	January 30	Los Angeles	3–0	Dallas		Bishop	17,655	28–19–4	60	Recap

February: 8–4–0 (Home: 5–2–0; Road: 3–2–0)
#	Date	Visitor	Score	Home	OT	Decision	Attendance	Record	Pts	Recap
52	February 1	Dallas	4–1	Arizona		Lehtonen	10,998	29–19–4	62	Recap
53	February 3	Minnesota	1–6	Dallas		Lehtonen	18,532	30–19–4	64	Recap
54	February 5	NY Rangers	1–2	Dallas		Bishop	17,543	31–19–4	66	Recap
55	February 8	Dallas	4–2	Chicago		Bishop	21,422	32–19–4	68	Recap
56	February 9	Pittsburgh	3–4	Dallas	SO	Lehtonen	18,532	33–19–4	70	Recap
57	February 11	Vancouver	6–0	Dallas		Bishop	17,889	33–20–4	70	Recap
58	February 16	St. Louis	1–2	Dallas		Bishop	18,532	34–20–4	72	Recap
59	February 18	Dallas	2–5	San Jose		Bishop	17,562	34–21–4	72	Recap
60	February 21	Dallas	0–2	Anaheim		Bishop	16,609	34–22–4	72	Recap
61	February 22	Dallas	2–0	Los Angeles		Lehtonen	18,230	35–22–4	74	Recap
62	February 24	Winnipeg	5–3	Dallas		Lehtonen	18,532	35–23–4	74	Recap
63	February 27	Calgary	0–2	Dallas		Bishop	17,124	36–23–4	76	Recap

March: 4–8–4 (Home: 4–2–2; Road: 0–6–2)
#	Date	Visitor	Score	Home	OT	Decision	Attendance	Record	Pts	Recap
64	March 1	Tampa Bay	5–4	Dallas	OT	Bishop	17,337	36–23–5	77	Recap
65	March 3	St. Louis	2–3	Dallas	OT	Bishop	18,321	37–23–5	79	Recap
66	March 5	Ottawa	3–2	Dallas	OT	Lehtonen	17,110	37–23–6	80	Recap
67	March 6	Dallas	0–2	Nashville		Lehtonen	17,342	37–24–6	80	Recap
68	March 9	Anaheim	1–2	Dallas		Lehtonen	18,532	38–24–6	82	Recap
69	March 11	Dallas	1–3	Pittsburgh		Lehtonen	18,637	38–25–6	82	Recap
70	March 13	Dallas	2–4	Montreal		Lehtonen	21,302	38–26–6	82	Recap
71	March 14	Dallas	5–6	Toronto	SO	Lehtonen	18,918	38–26–7	83	Recap
72	March 16	Dallas	2–3	Ottawa	OT	Bishop	15,842	38–26–8	84	Recap
73	March 18	Dallas	2–4	Winnipeg		Lehtonen	15,321	38–27–8	84	Recap
74	March 20	Dallas	3–4	Washington		Lehtonen	18,506	38–28–8	84	Recap
75	March 23	Boston	3–2	Dallas		Lehtonen	18,532	38–29–8	84	Recap
76	March 25	Vancouver	4–1	Dallas		Lehtonen	18,112	38–30–8	84	Recap
77	March 27	Philadelphia	2–3	Dallas	OT	Lehtonen	17,247	39–30–8	86	Recap
78	March 29	Dallas	2–5	Minnesota		Lehtonen	19,350	39–31–8	86	Recap
79	March 31	Minnesota	1–4	Dallas		Lehtonen	18,532	40–31–8	88	Recap

April: 2–1–0 (Home: 0–0–0; Road: 2–1–0)
#	Date	Visitor	Score	Home	OT	Decision	Attendance	Record	Pts	Recap
80	April 3	Dallas	4–2	San Jose		McKenna	17,451	41–31–8	90	Recap
81	April 6	Dallas	3–5	Anaheim		McKenna	17,355	41–32–8	90	Recap
82	April 7	Dallas	4–2	Los Angeles		Lehtonen	18,230	42–32–8	92	Recap

Legend: Win (2 points) Loss (0 points) Overtime/shootout loss (1 point)

== Player statistics ==
Final

Skaters

Regular season
Player	GP	G	A	Pts	+/−	PIM
Jamie Benn	82	36	43	79	20	54
Tyler Seguin	82	40	38	78	12	43
Alexander Radulov	82	27	45	72	4	72
John Klingberg	82	8	59	67	10	26
Mattias Janmark	81	19	15	34	−13	24
Radek Faksa	79	17	16	33	21	36
Devin Shore	82	11	21	32	−30	14
Tyler Pitlick	80	14	13	27	9	34
Esa Lindell	80	7	20	27	19	24
Jason Spezza	78	8	18	26	−12	12
Dan Hamhuis	80	3	21	24	−6	33
Antoine Roussel	73	5	12	17	1	126
Stephen Johns	75	8	7	15	10	41
Brett Ritchie	71	7	7	14	1	42
Remi Elie	72	6	8	14	5	18
Greg Pateryn	73	1	12	13	6	50
Gemel Smith	46	6	5	11	5	17
Martin Hanzal	38	5	5	10	−14	23
Julius Honka	42	1	3	4	−1	14
Jamie Oleksiak^{‡}	21	1	2	3	−6	18
Marc Methot	36	1	2	3	11	31
Curtis McKenzie	7	0	2	2	3	11
Jason Dickinson	27	0	2	2	−2	17
Dillon Heatherington	6	0	1	1	3	26
Adam Cracknell^{‡}	1	0	0	0	0	0

Goaltenders

Regular season
Player	GP	GS	TOI	W	L	OT	GA	GAA	SA	SV%	SO	G	A	PIM
Ben Bishop	53	51	2,886:50	26	17	5	120	2.49	1437	.916	5	0	1	4
Kari Lehtonen	37	30	1,944:18	15	14	3	83	2.56	946	.912	1	0	0	4
Mike McKenna	2	1	101:20	1	1	0	5	2.96	50	.900	0	0	0	0

^{†}Denotes player spent time with another team before joining the Stars. Stats reflect time with the Stars only.
^{‡}Traded mid-season
Bold/italics denotes franchise record

== Awards and honors ==
=== Awards ===
Regular season
Player	Award	Awarded
R. Faksa	NHL Third Star of the Week	December 4, 2017

=== Milestones ===
Regular season
Player	Milestone	Reached
T. Seguin	200th career NHL goal	November 24, 2017
K. Lehtonen	300th career NHL win	December 13, 2017
A. Radulov	200th career NHL point	January 20, 2018
D. Hamhuis	1,000th career NHL game	January 30, 2018
J. Klingberg	200th career NHL point	February 16, 2018

== Transactions ==
The Stars have been involved in the following transactions during the 2017–18 season.

=== Trades ===
Date	Details		Ref
June 26, 2017	To Vegas Golden Knights Dylan Ferguson; 2nd-round pick in 2020	To Dallas Stars Marc Methot
November 10, 2017	To Florida Panthers Ludwig Bystrom	To Dallas Stars Reece Scarlett
December 19, 2017	To Pittsburgh Penguins Jamie Oleksiak	To Dallas Stars Conditional 4th-round pick in 2019
February 3, 2018	To Nashville Predators Mark McNeill	To Dallas Stars Andrew O'Brien

=== Free agents acquired ===
Date	Player	Former team	Contract terms (in U.S. dollars)	Ref
July 1, 2017	Brian Flynn	Montreal Canadiens	1-year, $700,000	
July 1, 2017	Martin Hanzal	Minnesota Wild	3-year, $14.25 million	
July 1, 2017	Mike McKenna	Tampa Bay Lightning	1-year, $650,000	
July 1, 2017	Tyler Pitlick	Edmonton Oilers	3-year, $3 million	
July 1, 2017	Brent Regner	Florida Panthers	1-year, $650,000	
July 4, 2017	Alex Radulov	Montreal Canadiens	5-year, $31.25 million	
April 9, 2018	Tony Calderone	Michigan Wolverines	2-year, entry-level contract	

=== Free agents lost ===
Date	Player	New team	Contract terms (in U.S. dollars)	Ref
May 19, 2017	Travis Morin	Texas Stars	1-year	
June 17, 2017	Justin Hache	SønderjyskE	Unknown	
June 19, 2017	Matej Stransky	Severstal Cherepovets	2-year	
July 1, 2017	Maxime Lagace	Vegas Golden Knights	1-year, $650,000	
July 1, 2017	Antti Niemi	Pittsburgh Penguins	1-year, $700,000	
July 1, 2017	Patrick Sharp	Chicago Blackhawks	1-year, $1 million	
July 3, 2017	Ales Hemsky	Montreal Canadiens	1-year, $1 million	
August 1, 2017	Nick Ebert	Slovan Bratislava	1-year	
June 18, 2018	Andrew Bodnarchuk	Red Bull München	2-year	

=== Claimed via waivers ===
Player	Previous team	Date	Ref

=== Lost via waivers ===
Player	New team	Date	Ref
Patrik Nemeth	Colorado Avalanche	October 3, 2017	
Adam Cracknell	New York Rangers	October 9, 2017	

=== Players released ===
Date	Player	Via	Ref

=== Lost via retirement ===
Date	Player	Ref

=== Player signings ===
Date	Player	Contract terms (in U.S. dollars)	Ref
June 26, 2017	Esa Lindell	2-year, $4.4 million	
June 26, 2017	Mark McNeill	1-year, $660,000	
July 1, 2017	Patrik Nemeth	1-year, $945,000	
July 6, 2017	Brett Ritchie	2-year, $3.5 million	
July 8, 2017	Miro Heiskanen	3-year, $10.275 million entry-level contract	
July 10, 2017	Radek Faksa	3-year, $6.6 million	
July 11, 2017	Gemel Smith	1-year, $650,000	
August 4, 2017	Jamie Oleksiak	1-year, $964,688	
March 3, 2018	Jason Robertson	3-year, $2.775 million entry-level contract	

== Draft picks ==
Below are the Dallas Stars' selections at the 2017 NHL entry draft, which was held on June 23 and 24, 2017 at the United Center in Chicago.

Round	#	Player	Pos	Nationality	College/Junior/Club team (League)
1	3	Miro Heiskanen	D	Finland	HIFK (Liiga)
1	26^{1}	Jake Oettinger	G	United States	Boston Terriers (HE)
2	39	Jason Robertson	LW	United States	Kingston Frontenacs (OHL)
4	101	Liam Hawel	C	Canada	Guelph Storm (OHL)
5	132	Jacob Peterson	C	Sweden	Frolunda HC (J20 SuperElit)
6	163	Brett Davis	C	Canada	Kootenay Ice (WHL)
7	194	Dylan Ferguson	G	Canada	Kamloops Blazers (WHL)

Draft notes:

1. The Chicago Blackhawks' first-round pick went to the Dallas Stars as the result of a trade on June 23, 2017 that sent Anaheim's first-round pick in 2017 (29th overall) and a third-round pick in 2017 (70th overall) to Chicago in exchange for this pick.
