= Lagacé =

Lagacé or Lagace is a surname. Notable people with the surname include:

- Anne Lagacé Dowson (born Toronto, Ontario), award-winning radio journalist
- Bernard Lagacé (1930–2025), Canadian organist and musicologist
- Gisèle Lagacé (born 1970), Canadian writer and illustrator
- Jacob Lagacé (born 1990), Canadian ice hockey player
- Jean-Guy Lagacé (born 1945), former professional ice hockey defenceman
- Maurice E. Lagacé (born 1931), judge currently serving on the Federal Court of Canada
- Maxime Lagacé (born 1993), Canadian ice hockey goaltender
- Patrick Lagacé (born 1972), French-Canadian journalist
- Pierre Lagacé (born 1957), former professional ice hockey centre

== See also ==
- Raymond Lagacé Trophy, awarded annually to the Defensive Rookie of the Year in the Quebec Major Junior Hockey League
- Lagasse
