= Boudreault =

Boudreault may refer to:

- Jeannette Boudreault-Lagassé (1941–2006), a Quebec writer
- Phillip Boudreault (1975–2026), a Canadian boxer and outlaw biker
- Rivière des Boudreault, a tributary of the northwest shore of the Saint-Laurent river in Les Éboulements, Quebec, Canada
