= Lagasse =

Lagasse or Lagassé is a surname. Notable people with the surname include:

- Bob Lagassé, Canadian politician
- Emeril Lagasse (born 1959), American celebrity chef
- Jan Lagasse, American curler
- Janet Lagasse, American tennis player
- Jeannette Boudreault-Lagassé (1941–2006), Canadian writer
- Louis Lagassé (born 1947), Canadian businessman=
- Scott Lagasse (born 1959), American racing driver
- Scott Lagasse Jr. (born 1981), American racing driver
- Tim Lagasse (born 1969), American puppeteer

== See also ==
- Lagbas
