= Methot =

Methot is a surname. Notable people with the surname include:

- Marc Methot (born 1985), Canadian professional ice hockey defenceman
- Mayo Methot (1904–1951), American film and theater actress
