= Lagbas =

Lagbas is a surname. Notable people with the surname include:

- Danilo Lagbas (1952–2008), Filipino politician
- Karen Lagbas (born 1976), Filipino politician

== See also ==
- Lagasse
