= Dillon Heatherington =

Canadian ice hockey player (born 1995)

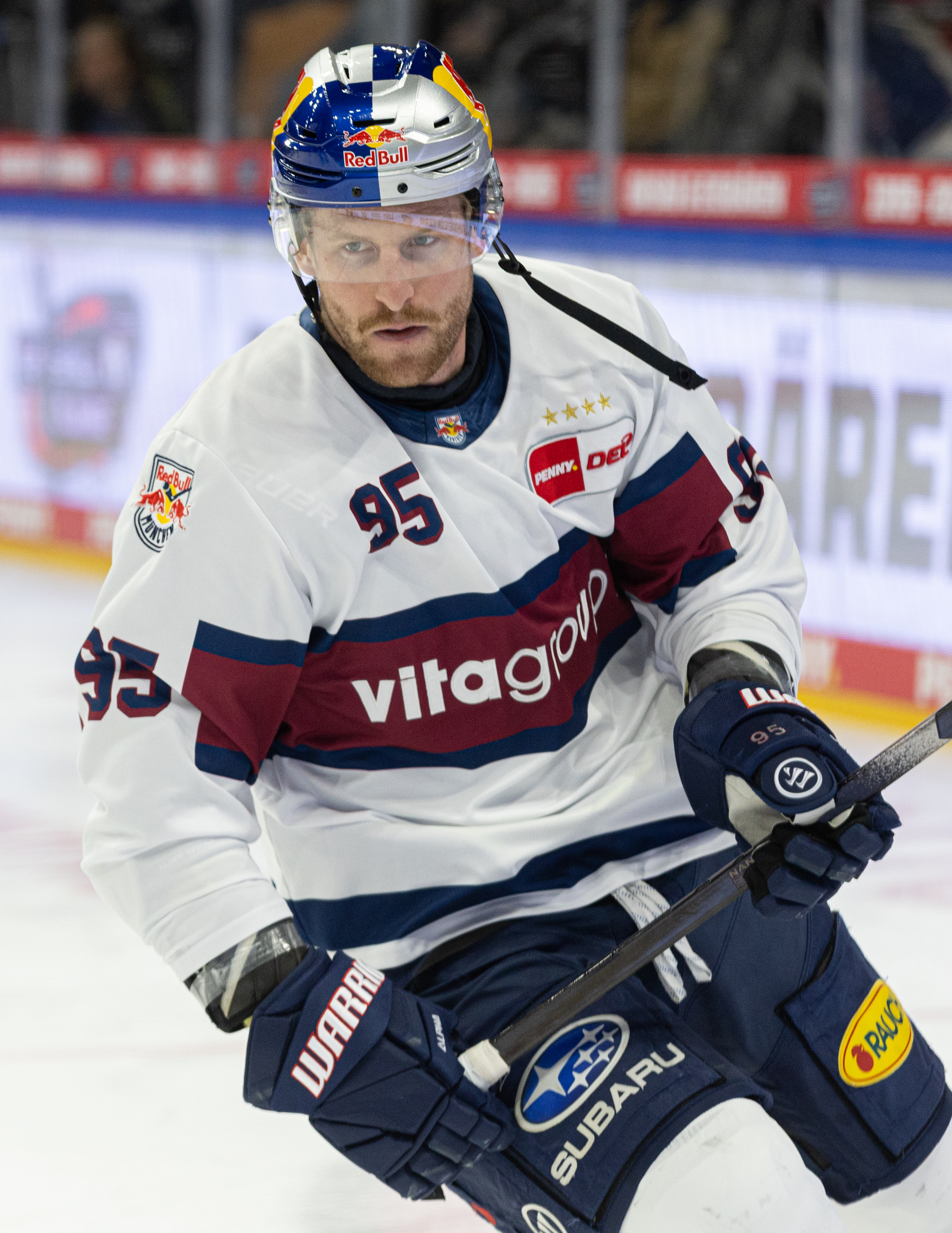
- Heatherington with the EHC München in 2025
- Born: May 9, 1995 (age 31) Calgary, Alberta, Canada
- Height: 6 ft 4 in (193 cm)
- Weight: 215 lb (98 kg; 15 st 5 lb)
- Position: Defence
- Shoots: Left
- DEL team Former teams: EHC München; Dallas Stars; Barys Nur-Sultan; Ottawa Senators
- NHL draft: 50th overall, 2013; Columbus Blue Jackets
- Playing career: 2015–present

Dillon Heatherington (born May 9, 1995) is a Canadian professional ice hockey defenceman currently playing for EHC München of the Deutsche Eishockey Liga (DEL). Heatherington was selected by the Columbus Blue Jackets of the National Hockey League (NHL) in the second round, 50th overall, of the 2013 NHL entry draft. He previously played with the Dallas Stars and Ottawa Senators of the NHL and Barys Nur-Sultan of the Kontinental Hockey League.

== Playing career ==
=== Amateur ===
Heatherington was selected by the Swift Current Broncos of the Western Hockey League (WHL) in the first round, 11th overall, of the 2010 WHL Bantam Draft. He joined Swift Current in the 2010–11 season, making one appearance and going scoreless. He established himself on the Broncos during the 2011–12 season, making 57 appearances, scoring two goals and eight assists for ten points. He returned to Swift Current for the following 2012–13 season in which he developed into one of the league's best defensive defencemen, tasked with shutting down the opposing team's top forwards, playing alongside Reece Scarlett. In 71 games, he tallied four goals and 27 points. The Broncos made the playoffs, but were knocked out in the first round by the Calgary Hitmen. In the series, he recorded three assists in five games.

Ahead of the 2013–14 season, Heatherington was one of three players named one of the Broncos' alternate captains in a player vote. In November 2013, Heatherington and teammate Colby Cave were named to Team WHL for the 2013 Subway Super Series in November 2013. He appeared in both of Team WHL's games in the exhibition series. He made 70 appearances with Swift Current, registering six goals and 35 points. They qualified for the playoffs and faced the Medicine Hat Tigers in the opening round. The Tigers eliminated the Broncos in six games of their best-of-seven series. In the series, he recorded one assist. Heatherington returned to Swift Current for his final year of major junior hockey in 2014–15, remaining as one of the team's alternate captains. He was named to Team WHL for the 2014 Subway Super Series in October 2014. He suffered an upper body in jury in January 2015 that caused him to miss significant time. He finished the season with one goal and 15 points in 48 games with the Broncos. Swift Current made the playoffs but once again did not get past the first round, falling to the Regina Pats in four games. Heatherington went scoreless in the series. He played his entire junior career with Swift Current, scoring 13 goals and 84 points in 237 games.

=== Professional ===
Heatherington was selected by the Columbus Blue Jackets of the National Hockey League (NHL) in the second round, 50th overall, of the 2013 NHL entry draft. Leading up to the draft, Heatherington was lauded as a top prospect. On March 1, 2015, Heatherington signed a three-year entry-level contract with the Blue Jackets. He signed an amateur tryout contract with the Springfield Falcons of the American Hockey League (AHL) on April 7 and made three appearances for the team, recording one assist. In his first full professional season in 2015–16, Heatherington was assigned to the Blue Jackets new AHL affiliate, the Lake Erie Monsters. As a staple of the Monsters defense corps, Heatherington appeared in 63 games adding 19 points. In the post-season, he collected three assists in 15 games as he helped contribute to the Monsters claiming the Calder Cup in his rookie season. During the following 2016–17 season, Heatherington began the season injured, suffering a fractured wrist in training camp. Once healthy, he was assigned to the renamed Cleveland Monsters on November 16. He collected six points in 38 games with the Monsters before he was dealt at the NHL trade deadline by the Blue Jackets to the Dallas Stars in exchange for Lauri Korpikoski on March 1, 2017. He was subsequently sent down to the Stars AHL affiliate, the Texas Stars. In 22 games with Texas, he recorded two goals and eight points.

He began the 2017–18 season with the Texas Stars. Heatherington was called up by Dallas on January 13, 2018, to replace defenceman Marc Methot, who was placed on injured reserve (IR). He played his first career NHL game against the team that drafted him, the Columbus Blue Jackets, on January 18, 2018. He recorded his first NHL point in a shootout win against the Pittsburgh Penguins on February 9, 2018, by assisting on Tyler Seguin's first period goal. He appeared in six games with Dallas before being sent back to the AHL. That season he narrowly missed winning his second Calder Cup after the Texas Stars were defeated by the Toronto Marlies in seven games in the final. In 55 regular-season games with Texas, he tallied three goals and 17 points. In 21 playoff games, he registered three points. He underwent offseason wrist surgery in June 2018. He re-signed with Dallas on July 16, to a one-year, two-way contract. He began the 2018–19 season with Texas, but was recalled on November 2 after Dallas suffered a plethora of injuries to their lineup. He played on the third pairing with Joel Hanley. Heatherington appeared in five games with the Stars registering one point before being sent back to the AHL. He played 73 games with Texas, tallying two goals and 24 points. He was recalled by Dallas on April 17, 2019, during the 2019 NHL playoffs. After injuries to Hanley and Taylor Fedun, he made his NHL playoff debut in Game 5 of Dallas' series with the St. Louis Blues, going scoreless.

In the 2019 offseason, he signed another one-year, two-way contract with Dallas on July 9. He was assigned to the AHL for the 2019–20 season, where he was made captain of the Texas Stars, the seventh in franchise history. In 59 games with Texas, he recorded two goals and 14 points before the season was paused on March 12, 2020, and then cancelled due to the COVID-19 pandemic.

Having left the Stars organization as a free agent after four seasons, Heatherington signed his first contract abroad, agreeing to a one-year contract with Barys Nur-Sultan of the Kontinental Hockey League (KHL) on November 2, 2020. He played in 41 games with Barys scoring two goals and seven points. Barys qualified for the KHL playoffs and faced Metallurg Magnitogorsk in the opening round, whom they eliminated. They faced Avangard Omsk in the second round, who knocked them out in turn. In six playoff games, Heatherington went scoreless.

After a lone season in the KHL, Heatherington returned to North America and the NHL in agreeing to a one-year, two-way contract with the Ottawa Senators on July 29, 2021. He began the season with Belleville, where he was named an alternate captain, but was recalled on November 11. He made his 2021–22 NHL season debut that night playing on the third pair with Michael Del Zotto in a 2–0 loss to the Los Angeles Kings. He spent the rest of the season shuttling between Belleville and Ottawa, on both the main roster and Ottawa's taxi squad. Heatherington appeared in nine games with the Senators without registering a point. With Belleville, he recorded two goals and 13 points in 45 games. Belleville qualified for the playoffs for the first time in franchise history, facing the Rochester Americans in the opening round. The Americans swept Belleville in two games in their best-of-three series.

In the offseason, Heatherington signed a two-year, two-way extension with the Senators. He was named captain of the Belleville Senators on October 11, 2022. During the 2022–23 season he was recalled on December 7, 2022 after Artem Zub and Jacob Bernard-Docker missed time due to injury. He played in one game before being returned to Belleville. He was recalled again on December 27 and then in the new year on February 19, 2023. He finished the season appearing in three games for Ottawa, going scoreless. In 60 games with Belleville, he recorded four goals and 15 points. Heatherington attended Ottawa's 2023 training camp, but failed to make the team. He was placed on waivers and after going unclaimed, was assigned to Belleville to start the 2023–24 season. In 60 games with Belleville, he tallied three goals and ten points.

Following three seasons within the Senators organization, Heatherington left to sign as a free agent to a one-year AHL contract with the San Diego Gulls, primary affiliate to the Anaheim Ducks, on July 2, 2024. He made 59 appearances for San Diego, tallying one goal and seven points.

After a lone season with the Gulls, Heatherington opted to leave North America as a free agent, signing a one-year contract with German club, EHC München of the Deutsche Eishockey Liga, on June 23, 2025.

== International play ==
Medal record

Representing Canada

Ice hockey

IIHF World U18 Championship
Gold medal – first place	2013 Sochi	

IIHF World U20 Championship
Gold medal – first place	2015 Canada	

Heatherington played with Team Canada at the 2013 IIHF World U18 Championships, winning a gold medal. He was selected to play for Team Canada's junior team at the 2015 World Junior Ice Hockey Championship and won the gold medal in a close 5–4 win over Russia.

In December 2023, Heatherington was selected to join Team Canada for the 2023 Spengler Cup. Canada advanced to the tournament semifinals, but lost to Dynamo Pardubice.

== Career statistics ==
=== Regular season and playoffs ===
			Regular season					Playoffs
Season	Team	League	GP	G	A	Pts	PIM	GP	G	A	Pts	PIM
2010–11	Calgary Flames Midget	AMHL	31	0	11	11	44	4	0	0	0	2
2010–11	Swift Current Broncos	WHL	1	0	0	0	0	—	—	—	—	—
2011–12	Swift Current Broncos	WHL	57	2	8	10	63	—	—	—	—	—
2012–13	Swift Current Broncos	WHL	71	4	23	27	80	5	0	3	3	0
2013–14	Swift Current Broncos	WHL	70	6	29	35	63	6	0	1	1	8
2014–15	Swift Current Broncos	WHL	48	1	14	15	48	4	0	0	0	4
2014–15	Springfield Falcons	AHL	3	0	1	1	0	—	—	—	—	—
2015–16	Lake Erie Monsters	AHL	63	3	16	19	50	15	0	3	3	6
2016–17	Cleveland Monsters	AHL	38	1	5	6	30	—	—	—	—	—
2016–17	Texas Stars	AHL	22	2	6	8	21	—	—	—	—	—
2017–18	Texas Stars	AHL	55	3	14	17	47	21	0	3	3	18
2017–18	Dallas Stars	NHL	6	0	1	1	26	—	—	—	—	—
2018–19	Texas Stars	AHL	73	2	22	24	75	—	—	—	—	—
2018–19	Dallas Stars	NHL	5	0	1	1	0	1	0	0	0	0
2019–20	Texas Stars	AHL	59	2	12	14	55	—	—	—	—	—
2020–21	Barys Nur-Sultan	KHL	41	2	5	7	40	6	0	0	0	2
2021–22	Belleville Senators	AHL	45	2	11	13	22	2	1	0	1	0
2021–22	Ottawa Senators	NHL	9	0	0	0	7	—	—	—	—	—
2022–23	Belleville Senators	AHL	60	4	11	15	63	—	—	—	—	—
2022–23	Ottawa Senators	NHL	3	0	0	0	0	—	—	—	—	—
2023–24	Belleville Senators	AHL	60	3	7	10	31	—	—	—	—	—
2024–25	San Diego Gulls	AHL	59	1	6	7	43	—	—	—	—	—
NHL totals			23	0	2	2	33	1	0	0	0	0
KHL totals			41	2	5	7	40	6	0	0	0	2

=== International ===
Year	Team	Event	Result	GP	G	A	Pts	PIM
2013	Canada	U18	1st place, gold medalist(s)	7	1	0	1	4
2015	Canada	WJC	1st place, gold medalist(s)	7	0	0	0	2
Junior totals				14	1	0	1	6

== Awards and honours ==
Awards	Year
AHL
Calder Cup (Lake Erie Monsters)	2016
International
IIHF World U18 Championships Gold Medal	2013
IIHF World U20 Championships Gold Medal	2015
