= Rivière des Boudreault =

River in Charlevoix Regional County Municipality, Quebec, Canada

- Location within Quebec

Location
- Country: Canada
- Province: Quebec
- Region: Capitale-Nationale
- Regional County Municipality: Charlevoix Regional County Municipality
- Municipality: Les Éboulements

Physical characteristics
- Source: Little unidentified lake
  - location: Les Éboulements
  - coordinates: 47°30′42″N 70°24′41″W
  - elevation: 423 m
- Mouth: Saint Lawrence River (Anse des Boudreault)
  - location: Les Éboulements
  - coordinates: 47°27′24″N 70°21′47″W
  - elevation: 4 m
- Length: 9.5 km (5.9 mi)

Basin features
- Tributaries
  - left: Six unidentified streams.
  - right: Seven unidentified streams.

The Rivière des Boudreault (English: Boudreault's River) is a tributary of the northwest shore of the St. Lawrence River, in the municipality of Les Éboulements, in the Charlevoix Regional County Municipality, in the administrative region of Capitale-Nationale, in the province of Quebec, in Canada.

The upper part of this small valley is accessible by the chemin du rang Sainte-Marie (east–west direction). The lower part is served by road Saint-François (west side), Route du Fleuve and rue Félix-Antoine-Savard; these last two roads are parallel to the Saint Lawrence river bank. Forestry and agriculture are the main economic activities in this valley. The residential area of Saint-Joseph-de-la-Rive is located at the foot of the cliff, on the northwest shore of Baie des Éboulements.

The surface of the Boudreault River is generally frozen from the beginning of December until the end of March; however, safe traffic on the ice is generally from mid-December to mid-March. The water level of the river varies with the seasons and the precipitation; the spring flood occurs in March or April.

== Geography ==
The Boudreault River rises from a small unidentified lake (length: 0.05 kilometres (0.031 mi); altitude: 423 metres (1,388 ft)), located in the forest area on the south side of chemin du rang Sainte-Marie, in Les Éboulements. The mouth of this small lake is located at:

- 7.9 kilometres (4.9 mi) north-west of the village center of Les Éboulements;
- 10.5 kilometres (6.5 mi) north-east of Baie-Saint-Paul town center;
- 25.3 kilometres (15.7 mi) south-west of La Malbaie town center;
- 7.1 kilometres (4.4 mi) north-west of the mouth of the Boudreault river.

From this source, the course of the Boudreault River descends on 9.5 kilometres (5.9 mi), with a drop of 419 metres (1,375 ft), according to the following segments:

- 2.7 kilometres (1.7 mi) first towards the south-west especially in the forest zone, then towards the south-east by forming a small hook towards the east, until the discharge of a stream (coming from West);
- 3.3 kilometres (2.1 mi) to the southeast, winding slightly, cutting Chemin Saint-Marc at the end of the segment, to route 362 (chemin du River);
- 3.5 kilometres (2.2 mi) south-east down the cliff with a drop of 306 metres (1,004 ft), cutting rue Félix-Antoine Savard and cutting the railway line the shore of the St. Lawrence River, to its mouth.

The Boudreault River flows into Anse des Boudreault, on the northwest shore of Baie des Éboulements, on the northwest shore of the Estuary of Saint Lawrence, in the village of Saint- Joseph-de-la-Rive. This mouth is located at:

- 0.9 kilometres (0.56 mi) north of the ferry quay connecting Saint-Joseph-de-la Rive and Île aux Coudres;
- 27.2 kilometres (16.9 mi) southwest of downtown La Malbaie;
- 4.3 kilometres (2.7 mi) south-west of the village center of Les Éboulements.

== Toponymy ==
The toponymic designation "Rivière des Boudreault" evokes the work of life of Clovis Boudreault, pioneer of the Éboulements, and his descendants who still live there. Formerly, a small power plant had been built at the foot of the cliff for the production of electricity for local needs. Upstream, near the hamlet Blagousse, a man named Osime (Onésime) Tremblay operated a card mill there at the beginning of the 20th century, which was later transformed into a sawmill and then a broom factory.

Several toponymic variants are part of the history of this watercourse: Ruisseau du Moulin à Carde, Ruisseau de Blagousse, Ruisseau Osime and Ruisseau Onésime. By error of localization, it was named Ruisseau du Seigneur. Rivière de la Pointe and Rivière de la Pointe des Éboulements are two other variants of the official name.

The toponym "Rivière des Boudreault" was formalized on August 17, 1978, at the Place Names Bank of the Commission de toponymie du Québec.

== Appendices ==
=== Related articles ===
- Charlevoix Regional County Municipality
- Les Éboulements, a municipality
- St. Lawrence River
- List of rivers of Quebec
