= Jon Merrill =

American ice hockey player (born 1992)

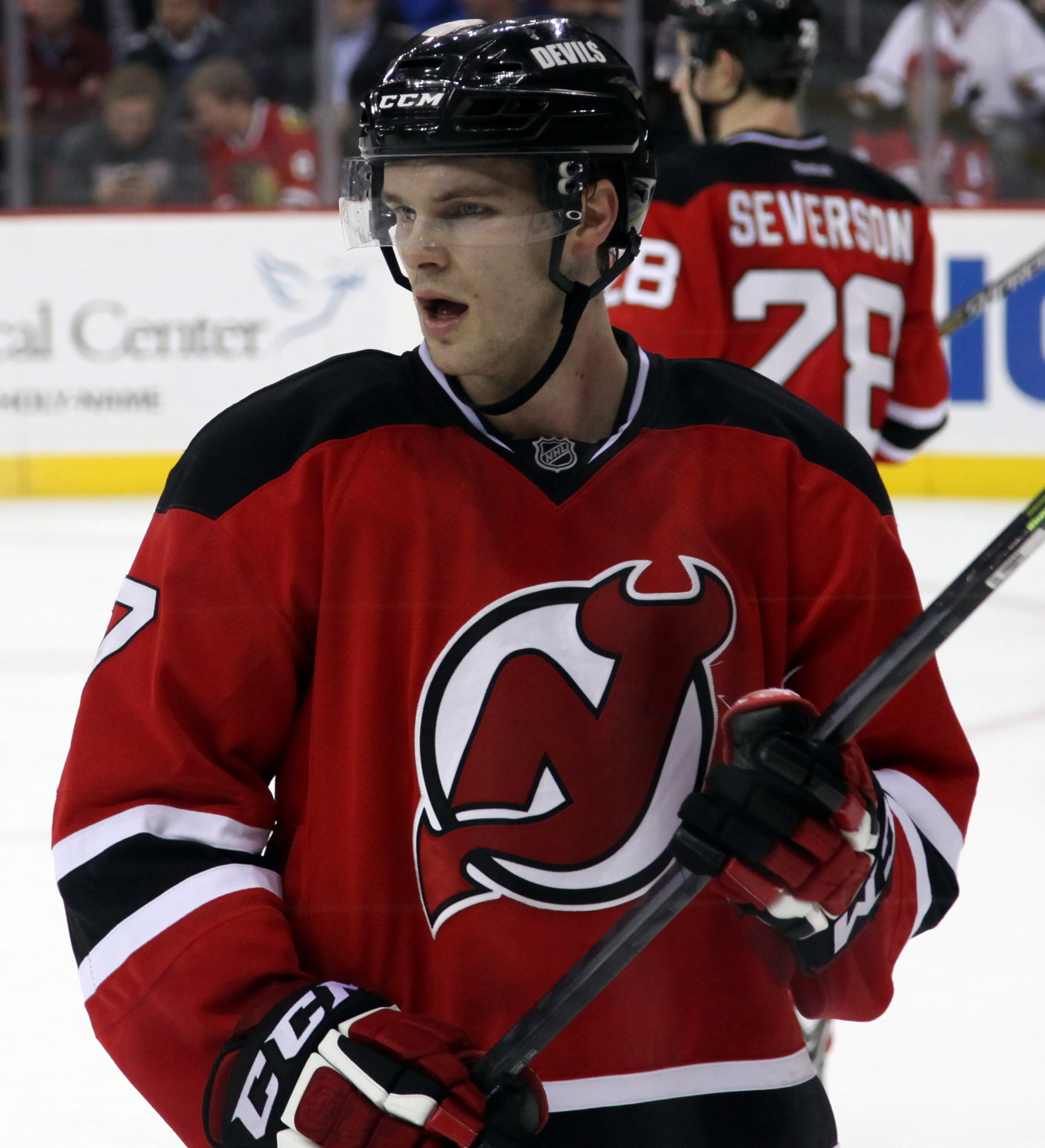
- Merrill with the New Jersey Devils in 2014
- Born: February 3, 1992 (age 34) Oklahoma City, Oklahoma, U.S.
- Height: 6 ft 3 in (191 cm)
- Weight: 205 lb (93 kg; 14 st 9 lb)
- Position: Defense
- Shoots: Left
- NHL team Former teams: Free Agent; New Jersey Devils; Vegas Golden Knights; Detroit Red Wings; Montreal Canadiens; Minnesota Wild
- National team: United States
- NHL draft: 38th overall, 2010; New Jersey Devils
- Playing career: 2013–present

Jonathon Merrill (born February 3, 1992) is an American professional ice hockey player who is a defenseman. He most recently played for the Minnesota Wild of the National Hockey League (NHL). He has previously also played for the New Jersey Devils, Vegas Golden Knights, Detroit Red Wings, Montreal Canadiens. The Devils selected Merrill in the second round, 38th overall, of the 2010 NHL entry draft.

== Early life ==
Merrill was born February 3, 1992, in Oklahoma City, Oklahoma. His family moved to Grand Blanc, Michigan, three years later, and Merrill began playing ice hockey with his older brother at the age of four. He went on to play minor ice hockey with the Detroit Little Caesars youth team, appearing with the team at the 2004 Quebec International Pee-Wee Hockey Tournament. A childhood fan of the National Hockey League's (NHL) Detroit Red Wings, Merrill was selected as one of the team's flag bearers during the 2006 Stanley Cup playoffs. In high school, Merrill spent two years with the USA Hockey National Team Development Program (NTDP), based not far from his home in Brighton, Michigan. During the 2009–10 season, Merrill had one goal and eight assists in 22 games for the NTDP.

== Playing career ==
=== College ===
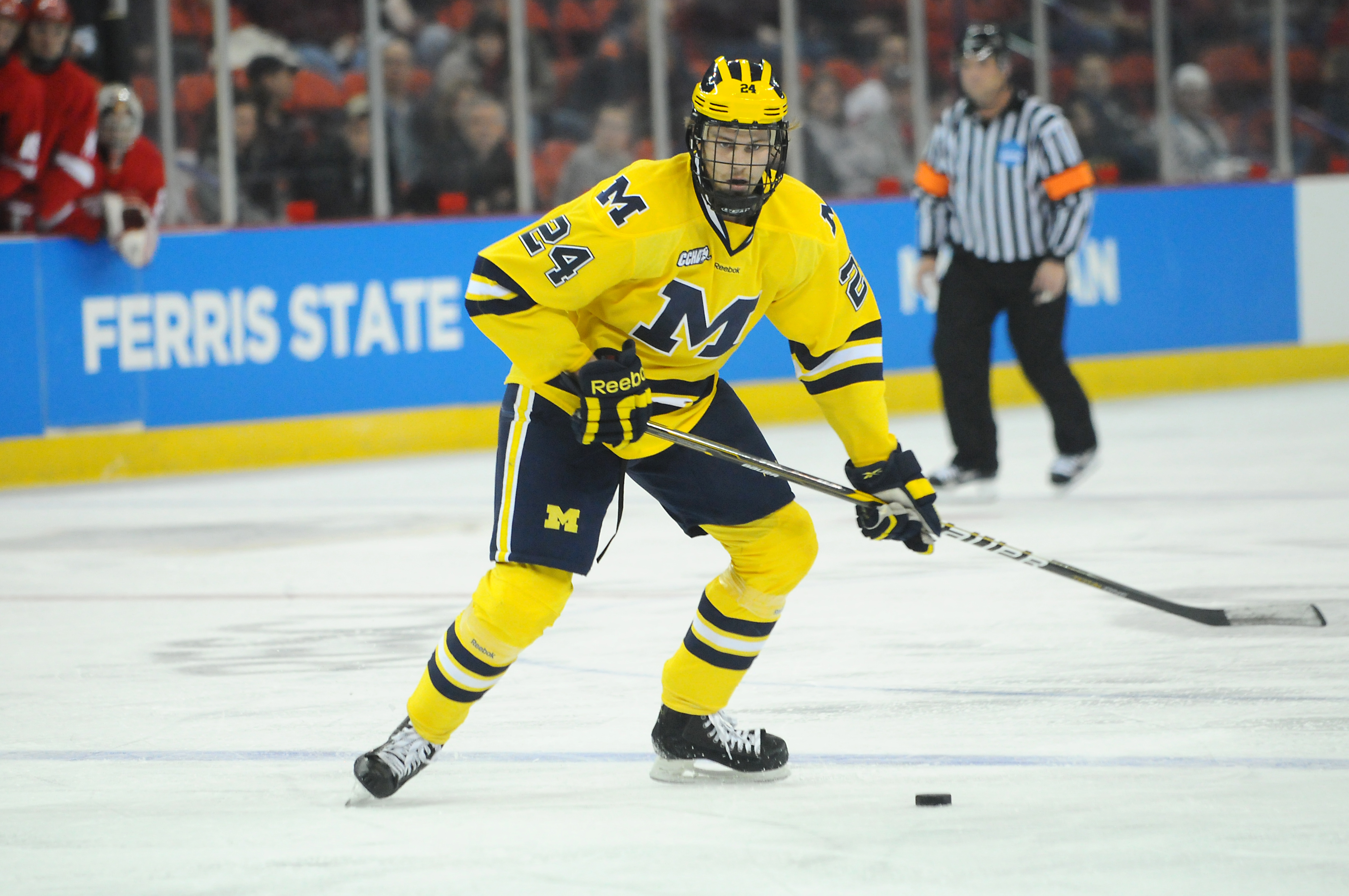
Merrill played for the Michigan Wolverines men's ice hockey team for the 2011–12 season.

Prior to turning professional, Merrill played NCAA college hockey with the Michigan Wolverines men's ice hockey team. Merrill was suspended for the first 12 games of the 2011–12 season by the University of Michigan for "violating team rules."

=== Professional ===
==== New Jersey Devils (2013–2017) ====
On March 27, 2013, the New Jersey Devils signed Merrill to a three-year entry-level contract, and he began the 2013–14 season in the American Hockey League (AHL) with the Albany Devils.

In the 2013–14 season, Merrill made his NHL debut on November 3, 2013, skating with the Devils in a game against the Minnesota Wild at Xcel Energy Center, but less than five minutes into he game he fell into the boards, sustaining severe facial lacerations and a concussion.

He scored his first NHL goal on February 7, 2014, a game winner in overtime against Ilya Bryzgalov of the Edmonton Oilers, making him the first Devil to score his first NHL goal in overtime.

==== Vegas Golden Knights (2017–2020) ====
On June 21, 2017, Merrill was selected in the NHL expansion draft by the Vegas Golden Knights. On January 16, 2018, Merrill signed a two-year, $2.75 million contract extension with the Golden Knights.

==== Detroit Red Wings (2020–2021) ====
After three seasons as an original member of the Golden Knights, Merrill left the club as a free agent and was signed to a one-year, $925,000 contract with the Detroit Red Wings on October 9, 2020. In the shortened 2020–21 season, Merrill registered five assists in 36 games from the blueline for the Red Wings before he was dealt at the trade deadline to the Montreal Canadiens in exchange for Hayden Verbeek and a fifth-round pick in the 2021 NHL entry draft on April 11, 2021.

==== Montreal Canadiens (2021) ====
Merrill made 13 further regular season appearances with the Canadiens, going scoreless, before featuring in 13 playoff games in helping Montreal reach the 2021 Stanley Cup Finals before falling to the Tampa Bay Lightning.

==== Minnesota Wild (2021–2025) ====
As a free agent from the Canadiens, Merrill joined his fifth NHL organization in agreeing to terms with the Minnesota Wild on a one-year, $850,000 contract on July 29, 2021.

On January 11, 2022, Merrill was signed to a three-year, $3.6 million extension with the Wild.

== International play ==
Medal record

Representing United States

World Junior Championships
Bronze medal – third place	2011 Buffalo	

World U18 Championships
Gold medal – first place	2009 Minnesota	
Gold medal – first place	2010 Minsk	

Merrill first represented the United States internationally at the 2009 IIHF World U18 Championships, where he recorded two assists in seven games en route to a gold medal victory over Sweden. He won another gold medal the next year at the 2010 IIHF World U18 Championships, recording one assist in seven games and being named one of the top three Team USA players in the tournament.

== Personal life ==
Jon is married to Jessica Merrill. Together, they are advocates for the LGBTQ community He spoke out against the NHL policy banning teams from wearing themed jerseys, specifically Pride Night jerseys, after several players across the league sat out of warm-ups instead of wearing the jerseys on Pride nights. Jon and Jessica were named "2024 Allies of the Year" for Twin Cities Pride.

Jon and Jessica have four daughters together.

== Career statistics ==
=== Regular season and playoffs ===
			Regular season					Playoffs
Season	Team	League	GP	G	A	Pts	PIM	GP	G	A	Pts	PIM
2008–09	U.S. NTDP U17	USDP	24	2	1	3	18	—	—	—	—	—
2008–09	U.S. NTDP U18	USDP	19	1	4	5	6	—	—	—	—	—
2008–09	U.S. NTDP U18	NAHL	26	2	2	4	14	—	—	—	—	—
2009–10	U.S. NTDP Juniors	USHL	22	1	8	9	12	—	—	—	—	—
2009–10	U.S. NTDP U17	USDP	2	0	1	1	2	—	—	—	—	—
2009–10	U.S. NTDP U18	USDP	56	5	27	32	18	—	—	—	—	—
2010–11	University of Michigan	CCHA	42	7	18	25	16	—	—	—	—	—
2011–12	University of Michigan	CCHA	19	2	9	11	15	—	—	—	—	—
2012–13	University of Michigan	CCHA	21	2	9	11	14	—	—	—	—	—
2012–13	Albany Devils	AHL	12	1	7	8	4	—	—	—	—	—
2013–14	Albany Devils	AHL	15	2	8	10	0	4	1	1	2	10
2013–14	New Jersey Devils	NHL	52	2	9	11	12	—	—	—	—	—
2014–15	New Jersey Devils	NHL	66	2	12	14	24	—	—	—	—	—
2015–16	New Jersey Devils	NHL	47	1	4	5	28	—	—	—	—	—
2016–17	New Jersey Devils	NHL	51	1	5	6	24	—	—	—	—	—
2017–18	Vegas Golden Knights	NHL	34	1	2	3	22	8	0	0	0	10
2018–19	Vegas Golden Knights	NHL	57	3	12	15	53	7	0	0	0	0
2019–20	Vegas Golden Knights	NHL	49	2	5	7	32	1	0	1	1	0
2020–21	Detroit Red Wings	NHL	36	0	5	5	12	—	—	—	—	—
2020–21	Montreal Canadiens	NHL	13	0	0	0	4	13	0	0	0	0
2021–22	Minnesota Wild	NHL	69	4	16	20	22	6	0	1	1	0
2022–23	Minnesota Wild	NHL	73	2	10	12	38	2	0	0	0	2
2023–24	Minnesota Wild	NHL	65	4	7	11	30	—	—	—	—	—
2024–25	Minnesota Wild	NHL	70	2	4	6	20	2	0	0	0	0
NHL totals			682	24	91	115	321	39	0	2	2	12

=== International ===
Year	Team	Event	Result	GP	G	A	Pts	PIM
2009	United States	U18	1st place, gold medalist(s)	7	0	2	2	4
2010	United States	U18	1st place, gold medalist(s)	7	0	1	1	2
2011	United States	WJC	3rd place, bronze medalist(s)	6	1	4	5	0
2012	United States	WJC	7th	6	0	4	4	6
2022	United States	WC	4th	1	0	0	0	0
Junior totals				25	1	11	12	12
Senior totals				1	0	0	0	0

== Awards and honors ==
Award	Year	Ref
College
NCAA All-Tournament Team	2011	
