= Maurice E. Lagacé =

Canadian judge

Deputy Judge of the Federal Court of Canada
- Incumbent
- Assumed office January 19, 2007

Personal details
- Born: October 29, 1931 (age 94) Verdun, Quebec

Maurice E. Lagacé (born October 29, 1931) is a judge who served on the Federal Court of Canada after having served as a puisne judge, and then as a supernumerary judge, at the Superior Court of Quebec.
