= Louis Lagassé =

Canadian businessman

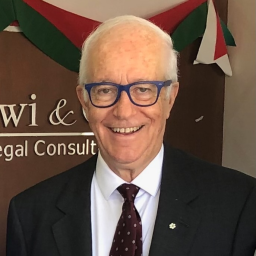
- Born: Sherbrooke, Quebec, Canada
- Years active: 1975–present
- Criminal penalty: 3 years imprisonment, 375,000 euros.
- Criminal status: Convicted
- Website: Louislagasse.com

Louis Lagassé (born 14 December 1947) is a Canadian businessman, notary, investor, and philanthropist. In 2004, he was made a member of the Order of Canada. In 1995, he founded the JA Louis Lagassé Foundation, to promote and develop the arts, music, philanthropy, science and culture in the Eastern Townships.

Lagassé received the Merit Estrien in 2008. He received the Gold Medal of the Jubilee of Queen Elizabeth II in 2002, the Medal for the 125th Anniversary of Canada (2000), Medal of Queen Elizabeth II Diamond Jubilee (2012), Medal of Honor of the House of Notaires (2011). He also invested in several projects, including the acquisition of the Granada Theatre in Sherbrooke.

In January 2020, he was sentenced to three years of prison in France and a fine of 375,000 euros for carrying out numerous "cash grabs".

On July 23, 2024, the Dobson-Lagassé Centre for Entrepreneurship, which he co-founded in 1995, fully incorporated into Bishop's University. The centre is "still considering" whether to keep the Lagassé name because of the businessman's legal troubles.

== Education and early career ==
Lagassé received a Bachelor of Arts from Jean-de-Brébeuf College in 1967. He attended the University of Salzburg in Austria and obtained a Diploma in Languages. In 1970, he attended the University of Montreal, where he obtained an LL.B. and earned an MBA from The University of Western Ontario in 1973. In 1975, he joined his father, Jacques Lagassé, as a partner in the family notary company. In 1998, he obtained an honorary degree from the University of Sherbrooke.

=== Biography ===
Lagassé taught as a visiting professor at the Faculty of Law of the University of Sherbrooke from 1975 to 1977. He gave several lectures to the Chamber of Notaries of Quebec.

In October 2011, Le Groupe Lagassé, led by Lagassé, experienced financial difficulties. The Superior Court of Quebec ordered Le Groupe Lagassé Inc. and Louis Lagassé to repay loans totaling nearly $CAD 1.8 million to the Business Development Bank of Canada, following the bankruptcy of SR Télécom, a subsidiary of the group. In addition, other lawsuits had been filed, including a claim by the Commission des normes du travail du Québec and unpaid fees to the law firm Stikeman Elliott.

In December 2011, Lagassé Communication et Industries (LC&I), a subsidiary of Groupe Lagassé in France, was placed in receivership by the Quimper Commercial Court. Lagassé lost control of the company located in Douarnenez, and two new directors were appointed to manage the 225 employees. The Works Council expressed concerns about financial management and hired lawyers to investigate the company's finances.

In 2014, Lagassé was indicted in France for misuse of corporate assets, bankruptcy, and embezzlement. Accused of embezzling €30 million from his telecommunications company, EADS, purchased in 2005, bail was set at €1 million. He was forced to resign from the board of directors of Hydro Québec. The Lagassé Group was ordered by the Superior Court to pay $CAD 1.6 million to the Business Development Bank of Canada (BDC) in 2011. The BDC had granted a loan to one of its subsidiaries three years earlier, but it was another company in the group that recovered the funds. Lagassé was ordered to pay the BDC $CAD 188,034, personally.
