= Oscar Dansk =

Swedish ice hockey player (born 1994)

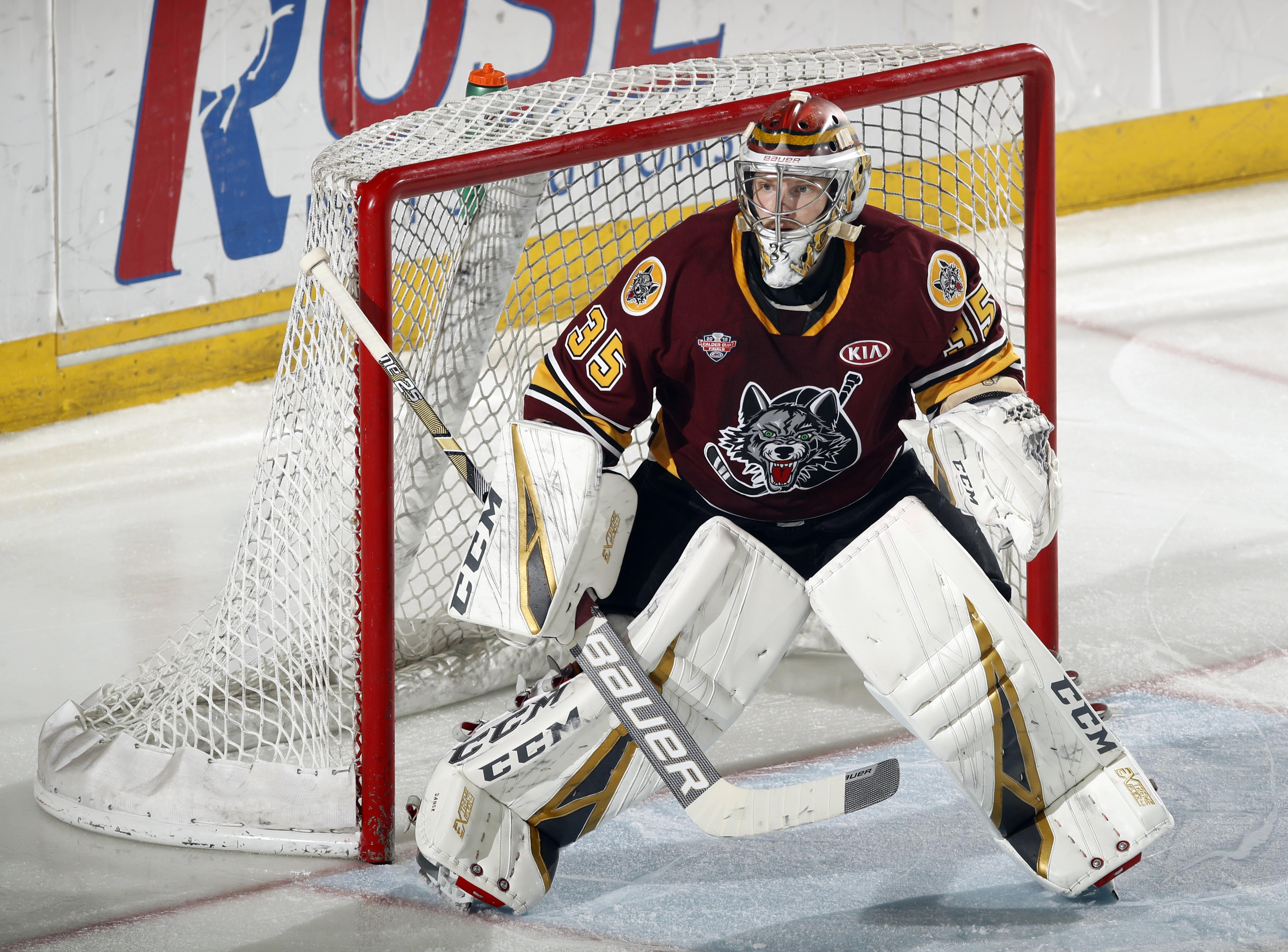
- Dansk with the Chicago Wolves in 2019
- Born: 28 February 1994 (age 32) Stockholm, Sweden
- Height: 6 ft 3 in (191 cm)
- Weight: 195 lb (88 kg; 13 st 13 lb)
- Position: Goaltender
- Catches: Left
- ELH team Former teams: Rytíři Kladno; Rögle BK; Vegas Golden Knights; Spartak Moscow
- NHL draft: 31st overall, 2012; Columbus Blue Jackets
- Playing career: 2014–present

Lars Gustaf Oscar Dansk (born 28 February 1994) is a Swedish ice hockey goaltender. He is currently playing with the Rytíři Kladno of the Czech Extraliga.He most recently played for the San Diego Gulls of the American Hockey League (AHL) while under contract with the Anaheim Ducks of the National Hockey League (NHL). Dansk was drafted by the Columbus Blue Jackets of the NHL with the 31st overall pick, the first pick of the second round at the 2012 NHL entry draft. He has also played with the Vegas Golden Knights of the NHL, Rögle BK of the Swedish Hockey League and Spartak Moscow of the Kontinental Hockey League. He was the starting goaltender for the Swedish national junior team at the 2014 World Junior Ice Hockey Championships and was the tournament's best goaltender.

== Playing career ==
=== Amateur ===
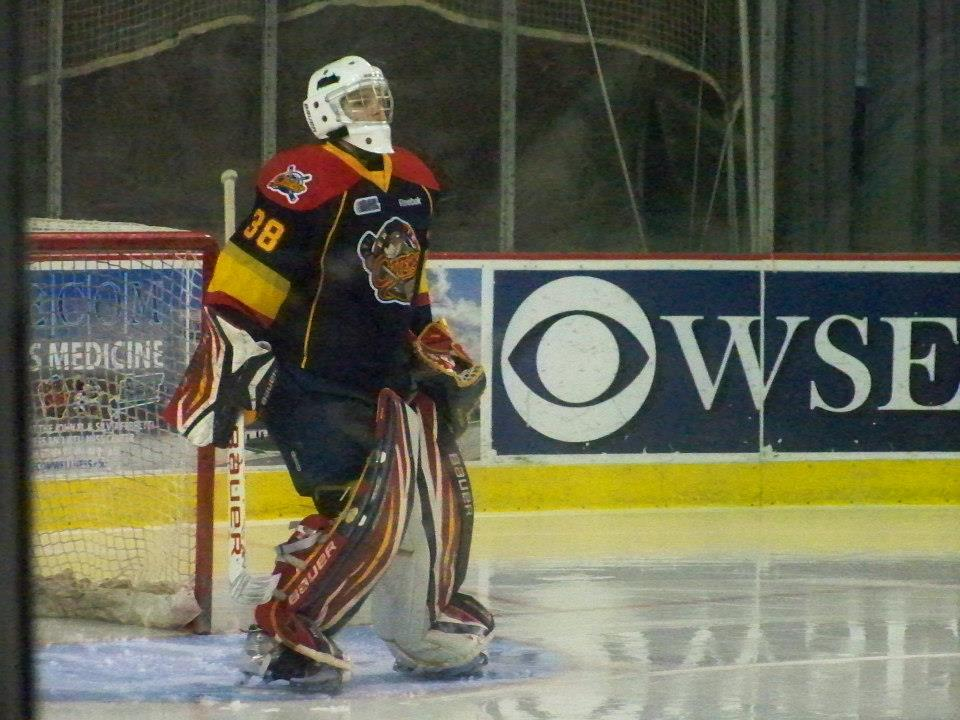
Dansk with the Erie Otters in 2013

Dansk moved to North America as a 13-year old, playing three seasons of junior hockey in the United States with Shattuck-St. Mary's prep school. He returned to Sweden as a teenager, playing with Brynäs IF junior team playing in the J20 SuperElit league for the 2010–11 and 2011–12 seasons.

Dansk was selected third overall by the Erie Otters of the Ontario Hockey League in the 2012 Canadian Hockey League import draft. In 2012–13 season, his rookie season with the Otters, he faced nearly 37 shots a night, but had a save percentage of 0.888 and a goals against average (GAA) of 4.11, playing alongside Connor McDavid on a team that failed to make the playoffs. The following season in 2013–14, Dansk improved his stats, as his GAA fell to 2.39 and his save percentage increased to 0.909 and the team went to the conference finals in the OHL playoffs. He was named to the OHL's Third All-Star Team after the season and shared the Dave Pinkney Trophy, for the lowest team goals-against average with his teammate, Devin Williams.

=== Professional ===
Dansk was drafted by the Columbus Blue Jackets of the National Hockey League (NHL) with the 31st overall pick, the first pick of the second round at the 2012 NHL entry draft. On 8 May 2014, Dansk was signed to a three-year entry-level contract by the Blue Jackets. In his first full professional season, Dansk split time between Columbus' affiliates, the Springfield Falcons and the Kalamazoo Wings in the American Hockey League (AHL) and ECHL respectively. He put up a 7–7–5 record with Springfield in 21 games, but had a GAA of 3.57 and a save percentage of 0.880. In Kalamazoo, Dansk appeared in 11 games, going 1–8–0, with a GAA of 3.73 but a save percentage of 0.889. Dansk returned to the Swedish Hockey League for the second season of his contract, on a one-year loan agreement with Rögle BK on 23 May 2015. In his first season with Rögle BK, Dansk appeared in 36 games, going 13–21–0 with a 0.910 save percentage and a 2.68 GAA. He returned for a second season in 2016–17, going 6–16–0 with a 3.00 GAA and a save percentage of 0.903. Both seasons, Rögle BK failed to make the playoffs.

At the conclusion of his entry-level contract with the Blue Jackets, he was not tendered an offer as a restricted free agent on 26 June 2017, having been passed on the depth chart by Anton Forsberg, Joonas Korpisalo, and Elvis Merzļikins. On 3 July, he signed a one-year, two-way contract with the NHL expansion team, the Vegas Golden Knights. He was re-assigned to begin the 2017–18 season with AHL affiliate, the Chicago Wolves. After just one game with the Wolves he was recalled to the injury-hit Golden Knights on 20 October 2017. The following day, Dansk made his NHL debut playing in the final 14 minutes and recorded his first NHL victory in a 3–2 overtime decision over the St. Louis Blues after he replaced Malcolm Subban, who was injured in the third period. As the Golden Knights temporary first choice goaltender, he then won his first NHL start making 29 saves on 31 shots in a 4–2 victory over the Chicago Blackhawks on 24 October 2017. He then got his first NHL shutout in a 7–0 win against the Colorado Avalanche, he made 32 saves in that game, also marking the first recorded shutout in the history of the Golden Knights franchise.

His success was short-lived, as he was injured on 30 October 2017 and was replaced by Maxime Lagacé. When cleared to play again, he was immediately reassigned to the Wolves on 24 January 2018. He played in four games, going 3–0–0 with a GAA of 1.48 and a save percentage of 0.946. He appeared in 20 games with the Wolves, going 13–3–2 with a GAA of 2.44 and a save percentage of 0.918. Dansk signed a two-year contract with Vegas on 7 July 2018. During Vegas' 2018 training camp, Dansk was placed on waivers, and after clearing, assigned to the AHL. In the 2018–19 season with the Wolves, Dansk registered a 27–13–2 record with a GAA of 2.46 and a save percentage of 0.915 in the regular season. The Wolves went on a run to the Calder Cup final during the 2019 AHL playoffs, and Dansk played in 19 playoff games, going 10–9–0 with a 2.48 GAA and a save percentage of 0.911, as they lost to the Charlotte Checkers.

Dansk began the 2019–20 season with the Wolves, but was recalled by Vegas on 12 October 2019. He made his NHL season debut on 21 October in a 6–2 loss to the Philadelphia Flyers, letting in all six goals. He was sent back to the Wolves on 23 October. He spent the remainder of the season with Chicago, going 18–12–4 in 35 games with a GAA of 2.57 and a save percentage of 0.908. In the 2020 offseason, Dansk signed one-year, $700,000 contract to remain with Vegas. In the pandemic-shortened 2020–21 season, his final season with the Golden Knights franchise, Dansk spent four months as part Vegas' taxi squad. He was assigned to the Golden Knights' on 23 February new AHL affiliate, the Henderson Silver Knights, and posted a 6–3–0 record with a GAA of 2.99 and save percentage of 0.902 in 11 games. He was recalled in March to backup Marc-André Fleury and made his season debut against the San Jose Sharks on March 5, registering his first NHL win since 2017 in a 5–4 victory.

After four years with the Golden Knights organization he left as a free agent following the 2020–21 season. Pausing his North American career, Dansk signed a two-year contract with Russian club, HC Spartak Moscow of the Kontinental Hockey League, on 5 July 2021. He appeared in 17 games with Spartak, with a record of 6–6–1, a save percentage of 0.910 and a GAA of 2.66.

On 13 July 2022, Dansk returned to North America as a free agent and signed a one-year, two-way contract with the Calgary Flames, spending the season playing backup to Dustin Wolf for the Flames AHL affiliate, the Calgary Wranglers. On 6 June 2023, Dansk re-signed with the Flames, again on a one-year, two-way contract. He backed up Wolf again during the 2023–24 season, going 11–12–3 in 27 games with the Wranglers.

On 5 September 2024, Dansk signed a one-year, two-way contract with the Anaheim Ducks. He was placed on waivers and after going unclaimed, was assigned to Anaheim's AHL affiliate, the San Diego Gulls.

== International play ==
Medal record

Representing (Sweden)

World U18 Championships
Silver medal – second place	2012 Czech Republic	

World Junior Championships
Silver medal – second place	2013 Russia	
Silver medal – second place	2014 Sweden	

Dansk first played for Sweden's junior team as part of the Under-16 setup. He was named a part of Sweden's Under-18 junior team for the 2012 IIHF World U18 Championships, which won silver. He was named to Sweden's Under-20 team for the 2013 World Junior Ice Hockey Championships and again for the 2014 World Junior Ice Hockey Championships where both teams captured silver and Dansk was named the 2014 tournament's top goalie.

== Personal life ==
Dansk is married and splits time between Canada and Sweden. He was wed in 2021.

== Career statistics ==
=== Regular season and playoffs ===
			Regular season									Playoffs
Season	Team	League	GP	W	L	OT	MIN	GA	SO	GAA	SV%	GP	W	L	MIN	GA	SO	GAA	SV%
2007–08	Shattuck-Saint Mary's	Bantam AAA	33	—	—	—	—	—	—	1.98	.910	—	—	—	—	—	—	—	—
2008–09	Shattuck-Saint Mary's	Bantam AAA	32	—	—	—	—	—	—	1.43	.934	—	—	—	—	—	—	—	—
2009–10	Shattuck-Saint Mary's	Midget AAA	18	13	2	1	—	—	—	1.89	.914	—	—	—	—	—	—	—	—
2010–11	Brynäs IF	J20	21	—	—	—	1157	52	1	2.70	.911	1	0	1	57	5	0	5.22	.857
2011–12	Brynäs IF	J20	28	19	7	0	1511	71	2	2.82	.910	2	0	2	120	7	0	3.49	.877
2012–13	Erie Otters	OHL	43	11	23	6	2393	164	0	4.11	.888	—	—	—	—	—	—	—	—
2013–14	Erie Otters	OHL	42	29	9	1	2405	96	6	2.39	.909	3	0	1	124	14	0	6.79	.797
2014–15	Springfield Falcons	AHL	21	7	7	5	1144	68	0	3.57	.880	—	—	—	—	—	—	—	—
2014–15	Kalamazoo Wings	ECHL	11	1	8	0	530	33	0	3.73	.889	—	—	—	—	—	—	—	—
2015–16	Rögle BK	SHL	36	13	21	0	1947	87	2	2.68	.911	—	—	—	—	—	—	—	—
2016–17	Rögle BK	SHL	24	6	16	0	1341	67	2	3.00	.903	—	—	—	—	—	—	—	—
2017–18	Chicago Wolves	AHL	20	13	3	4	1179	48	1	2.44	.918	2	0	2	117	6	0	3.08	.895
2017–18	Vegas Golden Knights	NHL	4	3	0	0	169	5	1	1.78	.946	—	—	—	—	—	—	—	—
2018–19	Chicago Wolves	AHL	40	27	9	4	2320	95	2	2.46	.913	19	10	9	1186	49	0	2.48	.911
2019–20	Chicago Wolves	AHL	35	18	12	4	2027	87	3	2.57	.908	—	—	—	—	—	—	—	—
2019–20	Vegas Golden Knights	NHL	1	0	1	0	60	6	0	6.00	.838	—	—	—	—	—	—	—	—
2020–21	Henderson Silver Knights	AHL	11	6	3	0	603	30	1	2.99	.902	—	—	—	—	—	—	—	—
2020–21	Vegas Golden Knights	NHL	1	1	0	0	62	4	0	3.91	.862	—	—	—	—	—	—	—	—
2021–22	Spartak Moscow	KHL	17	6	6	1	971	43	0	2.66	.910	5	1	4	307	9	0	1.76	.933
2022–23	Calgary Wranglers	AHL	17	8	6	2	960	44	0	2.75	.905	1	0	0	0	32	1	1.90	.875
2023–24	Calgary Wranglers	AHL	27	11	12	3	1508	81	0	3.22	.897	—	—	—	—	—	—	—	—
2024–25	San Diego Gulls	AHL	37	11	18	4	1987	115	0	3.47	.886	—	—	—	—	—	—	—	—
SHL totals			60	19	37	0	3288	154	4	2.81	.908	—	—	—	—	—	—	—	—
NHL totals			6	4	1	0	291	15	1	3.10	.906	—	—	—	—	—	—	—	—
KHL totals			17	6	6	1	971	43	0	2.66	.910	5	1	4	307	9	0	1.76	.933

=== International ===
Year	Team	Event	Result	GP	W	L	T	MIN	GA	SO	GAA	SV%
2012	Sweden	U18	2nd place, silver medalist(s)	5	4	1	0	273	9	1	1.98	.937
2012	Sweden	IH18	3rd place, bronze medalist(s)	4	—	—	—	—	—	—	2.70	.914
2014	Sweden	WJC	2nd place, silver medalist(s)	6	5	1	0	370	11	1	1.79	.929
Junior totals				15	—	—	—	—	—	—	—	—

== Awards and honours ==
Award	Year
Sweden
TV-pucken Best Goaltender	2010
J18 Elit (West) Best Goals Against Average	2011
OHL
Third All-Star Team	2014
Dave Pinkney Trophy	2014
International
Ivan Hlinka Memorial Tournament silver medal with Team Sweden	2011
WJC Best Goaltender	2014
