= Dylan Ferguson (ice hockey) =

Canadian ice hockey player (born 1998)

- Born: September 20, 1998 (age 27) Vancouver, British Columbia, Canada
- Height: 6 ft 1 in (185 cm)
- Weight: 189 lb (86 kg; 13 st 7 lb)
- Position: Goaltender
- Catches: Left
- Slovak team Former teams: HK Nitra; Vegas Golden Knights; Ottawa Senators; Dinamo Minsk
- NHL draft: 194th overall, 2017; Dallas Stars
- Playing career: 2017–present

Dylan Ferguson (born September 20, 1998) is a Canadian professional ice hockey goaltender for HK Nitra of the Slovak Extraliga (Slovak). Ferguson was originally selected 194th overall in the 2017 NHL entry draft by the Dallas Stars before he was traded to the Vegas Golden Knights. He was born in Vancouver and grew up in Lantzville, British Columbia.

== Playing career ==
Ferguson played midget hockey in the Saskatchewan Midget Hockey League with the Notre Dame Hounds as he was selected 166th overall by the Kamloops Blazers in the 2013 Western Hockey League (WHL) bantam draft. Ferguson played two more seasons with the Hounds before signing with the Blazers in 2015.

Following his second season of major junior hockey with the Blazers in 2016–17, serving as a backup to Connor Ingram, Ferguson was selected with the 194th overall pick in the 2017 NHL entry draft by the Dallas Stars. However, he was traded to the Vegas Golden Knights on June 27 (only two days after he was drafted) with a second-round pick in the 2020 NHL entry draft in exchange for defenceman Marc Methot.

On September 28, 2017, the Golden Knights signed Ferguson to a three-year, entry-level contract. He began the 2017–18 season with the Blazers. However, on October 31, Ferguson was called up by the Golden Knights under emergency basis following a number of goaltending injuries. Ferguson made his NHL debut on November 14, in relief of Maxime Lagacé against the Edmonton Oilers in which he allowed one goal on two shots in 9:14 of playing time. Ferguson was returned to the Blazers on November 17 after the Golden Knights activated Malcolm Subban from injured reserve. As the Blazers failed to make a postseason run, the Golden Knights called up Ferguson as their third backup goalie during the 2018 Stanley Cup playoffs.

Ferguson returned to the Blazers for the 2018–19 season after attending the Golden Knights training camp. During the Blazers season-opening week, Ferguson was named the WHL Goaltender of the Week after he recorded a 1.00 goals-against-average and a 0.970 save percentage. Ferguson was assigned to the ECHL's Fort Wayne Komets to start the 2019–20 season, but also saw time with the Golden Knights' American Hockey League (AHL) affiliate, the Henderson Silver Knights.

The Golden Knights declined to issue a qualifying offer to Ferguson at the conclusion of his entry-level contract, making him an unrestricted free agent. Ferguson then signed a professional tryout contract (PTO) with the Toronto Maple Leafs on August 11, 2022. After attending the Maple Leafs training camp and pre-season, Ferguson was re-assigned to join the Leafs' AHL affiliate, the Toronto Marlies, to begin the 2022–23 season on a PTO. Ferguson made five appearances with the Marlies before he was loaned to the Wichita Thunder of the ECHL on February 23, 2023. Before making an appearance with the Thunder, Ferguson was traded by the Marlies to the Belleville Senators of the AHL in exchange for future considerations on February 24. He was then signed to a two-way contract for the remainder of the season with the Belleville Senators' NHL affiliate, the Ottawa Senators, on March 2, 2023.

Ferguson was recalled by Ottawa after registering a 5–1–0 record with Belleville after joining the team. Ferguson's first NHL start came on March 20, 2023 against the Pittsburgh Penguins in Pittsburgh. It was also his first NHL victory as he made 48 saves in a 2–1 win. He lost his second game of the season with Ottawa 5–3 to the New Jersey Devils on March 25. He was returned to Belleville on March 28 after goalie Cam Talbot became healthy enough to return to Ottawa's lineup.

Following his brief tenure with the Senators, Ferguson left the organization as a free agent in the off-season. Unable to attract NHL interest, Ferguson opted to sign his first contract abroad, agreeing to a one-year contract with Belarusian club HC Dinamo Minsk of the Kontinental Hockey League (KHL) on July 28, 2023. He made 23 appearances in the KHL with 9-9-0 record with a .904 save percentage and 2.51 goals-against average.

After one season in the KHL, Ferguson returned to North America and signed a PTO with the Vancouver Canucks on September 15, 2024. He was released from his PTO by the Canucks and immediately signed a one-year AHL contract with the Iowa Wild, signing a one-year contract with the Minnesota Wild at the mid-point of the season.

As a free agent at the conclusion of the 2024–25 season, Ferguson returned to Europe in signing a one-year deal with Slovakian club, HK Nitra of the Slovak Extraliga, on July 10, 2025.

== Career statistics ==
| | | | Regular season | | | | | | | | | Playoffs |
| Season | Team | League | GP | W | L | OT | MIN | GA | SO | GAA | SV% | GP | W | L | MIN | GA | SO | GAA | SV% |
|---|---|---|---|---|---|---|---|---|---|---|---|---|---|---|---|---|---|---|---|
| 2012–13 | Notre Dame Hounds | SMHL | 3 | — | — | — | — | — | — | 2.62 | .889 | — | — | — | — | — | — | — | — |
| 2013–14 | Notre Dame Argos | SMHL | 24 | — | — | — | — | — | — | 2.62 | .896 | 6 | — | — | — | — | — | 1.66 | .945 |
| 2014–15 | Notre Dame Hounds | SMHL | 25 | — | — | — | — | — | — | 2.70 | .907 | 4 | — | — | — | — | — | 2.02 | .918 |
| 2015–16 | Kamloops Blazers | WHL | 16 | 4 | 10 | 0 | 814 | 56 | 1 | 4.13 | .875 | — | — | — | — | — | — | — | — |
| 2016–17 | Kamloops Blazers | WHL | 31 | 16 | 10 | 2 | 1706 | 78 | 0 | 2.74 | .922 | — | — | — | — | — | — | — | — |
| 2017–18 | Kamloops Blazers | WHL | 59 | 24 | 28 | 3 | 3382 | 166 | 1 | 2.95 | .907 | — | — | — | — | — | — | — | — |
| 2017–18 | Vegas Golden Knights | NHL | 1 | 0 | 0 | 0 | 9 | 1 | 0 | 6.67 | .500 | — | — | — | — | — | — | — | — |
| 2018–19 | Kamloops Blazers | WHL | 49 | 17 | 24 | 1 | 2612 | 131 | 1 | 3.01 | .908 | 5 | 2 | 2 | 237 | 13 | 0 | 3.29 | .887 |
| 2019–20 | Fort Wayne Komets | ECHL | 16 | 7 | 4 | 2 | 806 | 52 | 0 | 3.87 | .869 | — | — | — | — | — | — | — | — |
| 2019–20 | Chicago Wolves | AHL | 2 | 1 | 0 | 0 | 112 | 3 | 0 | 1.60 | .941 | — | — | — | — | — | — | — | — |
| 2020–21 | Henderson Silver Knights | AHL | 1 | 1 | 0 | 0 | 60 | 0 | 1 | 0.00 | 1.000 | — | — | — | — | — | — | — | — |
| 2020–21 | Fort Wayne Komets | ECHL | 11 | 7 | 3 | 1 | 641 | 21 | 1 | 1.96 | .920 | 13 | 8 | 4 | 757 | 37 | 1 | 2.93 | .907 |
| 2021–22 | Henderson Silver Knights | AHL | 13 | 5 | 4 | 0 | 641 | 31 | 1 | 2.90 | .907 | — | — | — | — | — | — | — | — |
| 2022–23 | Toronto Marlies | AHL | 5 | 2 | 2 | 0 | 250 | 13 | 0 | 3.12 | .888 | — | — | — | — | — | — | — | — |
| 2022–23 | Belleville Senators | AHL | 8 | 6 | 1 | 0 | 392 | 15 | 0 | 2.30 | .926 | — | — | — | — | — | — | — | — |
| 2022–23 | Ottawa Senators | NHL | 2 | 1 | 1 | 0 | 119 | 5 | 0 | 2.52 | .940 | — | — | — | — | — | — | — | — |
| 2023–24 | Dinamo Minsk | KHL | 23 | 9 | 9 | 0 | 1170 | 49 | 0 | 2.51 | .904 | — | — | — | — | — | — | — | — |
| 2024–25 | Iowa Heartlanders | ECHL | 1 | 1 | 0 | 0 | 60 | 0 | 1 | 0.00 | 1.000 | — | — | — | — | — | — | — | — |
| 2024–25 | Iowa Wild | AHL | 12 | 3 | 8 | 0 | 646 | 41 | 0 | 3.81 | .878 | — | — | — | — | — | — | — | — |
| NHL totals | | | 3 | 1 | 1 | 0 | 128 | 6 | 0 | 2.81 | .929 | — | — | — | — | — | — | — | — |

== Awards and honours ==
| Award | Year |
|---|---|
ECHL
| Kelly Cup (Fort Wayne Komets) | 2021 |
