= Jeannette Boudreault-Lagassé =

- Born: 30 March 1941; Dosquet, Quebec, Quebec, Canada
- Died: 22 February 2006 (aged 64); Montreal, Quebec, Canada
- Occupation: Writer

Jeannette Boudreault-Lagassé (March 30, 1941 in Dosquet, Quebec – February 22, 2006 in Montreal, Quebec.) was a Quebec writer.

== Bibliography ==
- 1991: Rires et sourires avec nos ancêtres (English: Laughs and smiles with our ancestors), Jeannette (Boudreault) and Robert Lagassé, ISBN 2980154334, Éditions Mémoire.(in French)
- 1992: 1867 Comme si vous y étiez (English: 1867 As if you were there) Jeannette (Boudreault) and Robert Lagassé, ISBN 2980154342, Éditions Mémoire.(in French)
- 1994: Rires et sourires avec nos ancêtres (English: Laughs and smiles with our ancestors, II), Jeannette (Boudreault) and Robert Lagassé, Éditions Mémoire.(in French)
- 1994: Crimes Humains, Justice Humaine (English: Human Crimes, Human Justice) ISBN 2921739003, Jeannette (Boudreault) and Robert Lagassé, ISBN 9782921739009, Éditions Mémoire.(in French)
- 2005: Répertoire des Baptêmes, Mariages et Sépultures de la Paroisse Saint-Octave de Dosquet, Comté de Lotbinière, Qc, 1913–1941 (English: Directory of Baptisms, Weddings and Burials of the Saint-Octave Parish of Dosquet, County of Lotbinière, Qc, 1913–1941), Jeannette Boudreault-Lagassé, ISBN 9782921664837, Longueuil Genealogy Club.(in French)
- 2005: Répertoire des Baptêmes, Mariages et Sépultures de la Paroisse Saint-Raymond-De-Pennafort, Comté de Wolfe, QC, 1913–1940 (English: Directory of Baptisms, Weddings and Burials of the Saint-Raymond-De-Pennafort Parish, Wolfe County, QC, 1913–1940), Jeannette (Boudreault) and Robert Lagassé, ISBN 2921664828}, ISBN 9782921664820, Longueuil Genealogy Club.(in French)
