= Marc Methot =

Canadian ice hockey player (born 1985)

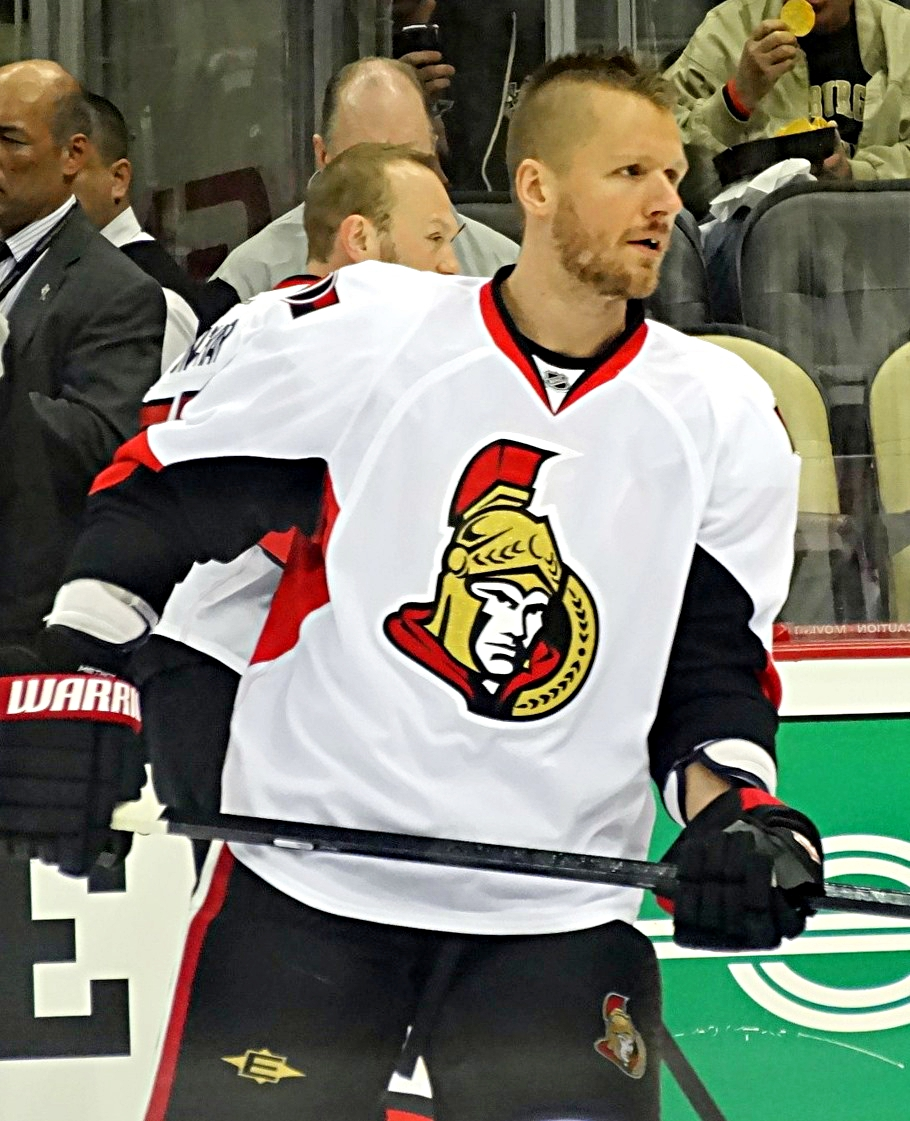
- Methot with the Ottawa Senators in 2013
- Born: June 21, 1985 (age 41) Ottawa, Ontario, Canada
- Height: 6 ft 5 in (196 cm)
- Weight: 224 lb (102 kg; 16 st 0 lb)
- Position: Defence
- Shot: Left
- Played for: Columbus Blue Jackets; Ottawa Senators; Dallas Stars
- National team: Canada
- NHL draft: 168th overall, 2003; Columbus Blue Jackets
- Playing career: 2005–2019

Marc Philippe Methot (born June 21, 1985) is a Canadian former professional ice hockey player. During his career, he played for the National Hockey League's Columbus Blue Jackets, Ottawa Senators, and Dallas Stars.

== Playing career ==
=== Amateur ===
Methot played major junior ice hockey for the London Knights of the Ontario Hockey League (OHL) beginning in the 2002–03 season. Following his first season in the OHL, he was drafted by the Columbus Blue Jackets at the 2003 NHL entry draft, 168th overall in the sixth round.

In the 2004–05 season, Methot and the Knights won the 2005 Memorial Cup, prevailing over the Rimouski Océanic in the final.

=== Professional ===
==== Columbus Blue Jackets ====
Methot made his professional debut during the 2005–06 season with the Syracuse Crunch, Columbus' then-American Hockey League (AHL) affiliate. He spent the entire year with the Crunch, playing in 70 games and scoring two goals and 11 assists for 13 points.

Methot then made his NHL debut with the Blue Jackets during the 2006–07 season, appearing in 20 games, in addition to 59 with Syracuse. He then became a regular on the Columbus blueline beginning in the 2008–09 season.

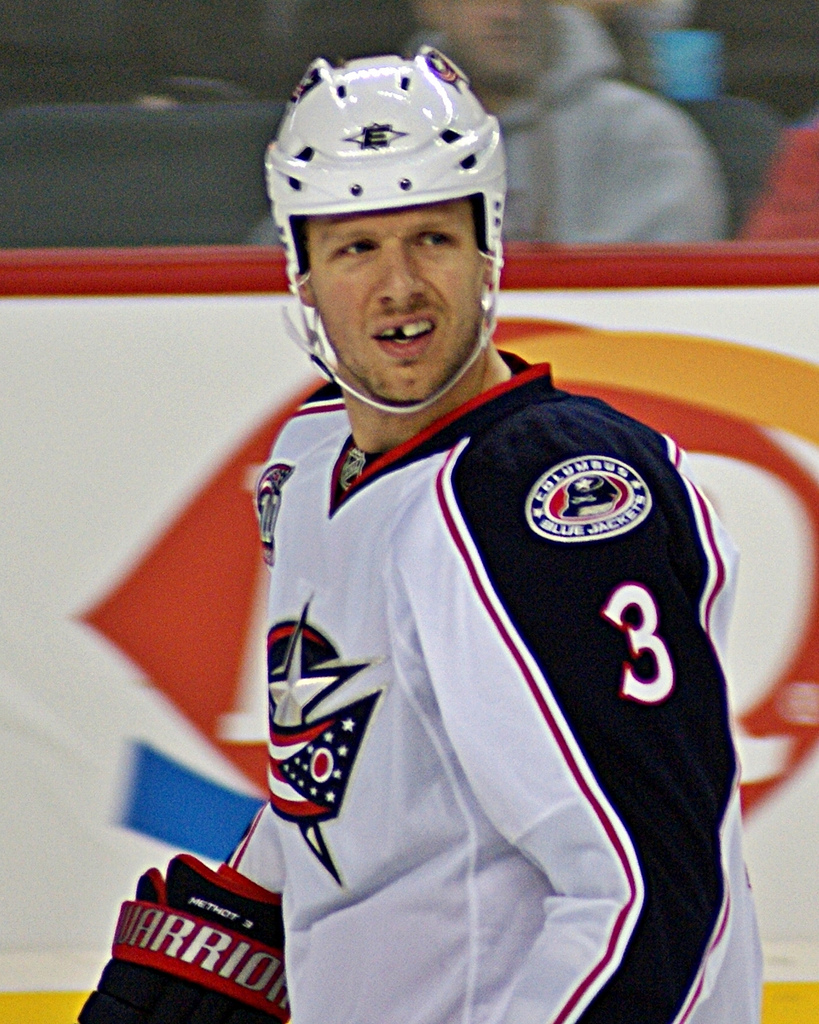
Methot in 2010 as a member of the Columbus Blue Jackets.

On July 5, 2011, the Blue Jackets re-signed Methot to a four-year contract extension. He played for Team Canada during the 2011 and 2012 World Championships. An assortment of injuries limited Methot's effectiveness with the Blue Jackets, most notably a mandibular fracture suffered during the 2011–12 season.

==== Ottawa Senators ====
On July 1, 2012, Methot was traded to the Ottawa Senators in exchange for forward Nick Foligno. Ottawa had reportedly on multiple occasions attempted to acquire the defenceman during the 2011–12 season, but were unable to finalize the transaction. The loss of two of Ottawa's starting six defencemen via free-agency meant that acquiring a defenceman became a major priority, and the team again set their sights on Methot, an Ottawa native. After starting the season paired with Norris Trophy-winning defenceman Erik Karlsson, Methot was charged with the responsibility on anchoring the team's defense after his partner was lost to an Achilles injury. The Senators finished the year with the NHL's second-lowest goals against average (GAA) as a team, and Methot's steady play led to an invite to Team Canada's training camp in the summer of 2013 in preparation for the 2014 Winter Olympics, though he was not ultimately selected for the final roster.

On February 16, 2015, Methot signed a $19.6 million contract extension with Ottawa carrying an average annual value of $4.9 million. The deal would have kept Methot in Ottawa for a further four seasons.

On March 23, 2017, Methot suffered an injury when Sidney Crosby, during a home game against the Pittsburgh Penguins, slashed him on the hand, severing the tip of his left pinky, requiring ten stitches to repair the severed fingertip. Crosby was not penalized and was not suspended or fined. Methot later returned in the post-season to help the Senators reach the Eastern Conference Finals, where he lost in 7 games to Crosby’s Pittsburgh Penguins.

==== Dallas Stars ====
After his fifth season with the Senators, Methot was left exposed by the club at the 2017 NHL expansion draft. With the Senators unable to work out a trade to prevent his selection, he was chosen by the Vegas Golden Knights on June 21, 2017.

Just five days later, on June 26, Methot was traded by the Golden Knights to the Dallas Stars in exchange for Dylan Ferguson and 2020 2nd-round pick. Methot was also forced to choose a different jersey number after previously wearing #3 with both the Blue Jackets and Senators, as John Klingberg already wore the number. Methot chose to wear #33. Methot would remain with the Stars for the rest of his contract but played only 45 games over two seasons due to injury.

On March 9, 2021, Methot confirmed on Twitter that he had retired after playing 13 seasons in the NHL.

== The Wally and Methot Show ==
In 2021, Methot teamed with former TSN reporter Brent Wallace to launch The Wally and Methot Show, a weekly podcast discussing the Ottawa Senators and other events happening throughout the hockey world. The first episode, released on March 8, 2021, featured former Senators' captain Daniel Alfredsson. Subsequent episodes featured the likes of Erik Karlsson, Brady Tkachuk, and Bob McKenzie. Episodes are released on YouTube and other platforms. Methot has left the show, and now it's just Brent Wallace, and Jason York. The Podcast is now titled "Coming in hot".

== Personal life ==
Methot resided in the Mooney's Bay area of Ottawa. He attended Brookfield High School in Ottawa, Ontario.

== Career statistics ==
=== Regular season and playoffs ===
			Regular season					Playoffs
Season	Team	League	GP	G	A	Pts	PIM	GP	G	A	Pts	PIM
2001–02	Kanata Valley Lasers	CJHL	50	3	10	13	22	11	0	1	1	4
2002–03	London Knights	OHL	68	2	13	15	46	14	2	4	6	6
2003–04	London Knights	OHL	63	2	9	11	66	15	0	3	3	18
2004–05	London Knights	OHL	67	4	12	16	88	18	2	1	3	32
2005–06	Syracuse Crunch	AHL	70	2	11	13	75	5	0	0	0	8
2006–07	Syracuse Crunch	AHL	59	1	15	16	58	—	—	—	—	—
2006–07	Columbus Blue Jackets	NHL	20	0	4	4	12	—	—	—	—	—
2007–08	Syracuse Crunch	AHL	66	7	6	13	130	13	0	6	6	14
2007–08	Columbus Blue Jackets	NHL	9	0	0	0	8	—	—	—	—	—
2008–09	Columbus Blue Jackets	NHL	66	4	13	17	55	4	0	0	0	2
2009–10	Columbus Blue Jackets	NHL	60	2	6	8	51	—	—	—	—	—
2010–11	Columbus Blue Jackets	NHL	74	0	15	15	58	—	—	—	—	—
2011–12	Columbus Blue Jackets	NHL	46	1	6	7	24	—	—	—	—	—
2012–13	Ottawa Senators	NHL	47	2	9	11	31	10	1	4	5	6
2013–14	Ottawa Senators	NHL	75	6	17	23	28	—	—	—	—	—
2014–15	Ottawa Senators	NHL	45	1	10	11	18	6	0	0	0	6
2014–15	Binghamton Senators	AHL	1	0	0	0	0	—	—	—	—	—
2015–16	Ottawa Senators	NHL	69	5	7	12	34	—	—	—	—	—
2016–17	Ottawa Senators	NHL	68	0	12	12	24	18	2	2	4	10
2017–18	Dallas Stars	NHL	36	1	2	3	31	—	—	—	—	—
2018–19	Dallas Stars	NHL	9	0	0	0	6	—	—	—	—	—
NHL totals			624	22	101	123	380	38	3	6	9	24

=== International ===
Year	Team	Event	Result	GP	G	A	Pts	PIM
2011	Canada	WC	5th	7	0	0	0	2
2012	Canada	WC	5th	6	0	2	2	25
Senior totals				13	0	2	2	27
