= Maxime Lagacé =

Canadian ice hockey player (born 1993)

- Lagacé with the Graz99ers in 2026
- Born: January 12, 1993 (age 33) Saint-Augustin, Quebec, Canada
- Height: 6 ft 2 in (188 cm)
- Weight: 190 lb (86 kg; 13 st 8 lb)
- Position: Goaltender
- Catches: Left
- ICEHL team Former teams: Graz99ers; Vegas Golden Knights; Pittsburgh Penguins; Tampa Bay Lightning; Färjestad BK
- NHL draft: Undrafted
- Playing career: 2014–present

Maxime Lagacé (born January 12, 1993) is a Canadian professional ice hockey goaltender who is currently playing for Graz99ers in the ICE Hockey League (ICEHL).

== Playing career ==
As a youth, Lagacé played in the 2005 and 2006 Quebec International Pee-Wee Hockey Tournaments with a minor ice hockey team from Rive-Nord.

=== Junior ===
Lagacé began his junior years with the Quebec Major Junior Hockey League in 2010. His first team was the P.E.I. Rocket for three years, finishing with a total record of 33–80–6 in 107 games and a .873 save percentage average. Lagacé also appeared in his only junior playoff game with the Rocket.

On July 23, 2012, Lagacé signed a three-year, $1.83 million entry-level contract with the Dallas Stars. Lagacé had participated in the Stars' Development Camp earlier that summer.

Lagacé was transferred to the Cape Breton Screaming Eagles in 2013, where he only played eight games with a 3–3–1 record and a .887 save percentage. He was then traded to the Shawinigan Cataractes and the Sherbrooke Phoenix in the same season.

=== Professional ===
==== Dallas Stars ====
Maxime Lagacé entered the American Hockey League under his contract with the Dallas Stars, playing for their affiliate Texas Stars. He had only played a single game with no wins or losses, as he was pulled in the midst of the game.

Lagacé signed with the Missouri Mavericks of the ECHL in the 2014–15 season, but he was eventually traded to the Bakersfield Condors, where he would make his personal best save percentage of .915. He would then return with the Stars in the AHL the following year, playing in 36 games with a 19–10–3 record and .913 save percentage. The Stars would send Lagacé back down to the ECHL with their affiliate, the Idaho Steelheads. He would sign a one-year, two-way, $600,000 extension with the Dallas Stars in that same year.

==== Vegas Golden Knights ====
Lagacé played two more seasons in the AHL with the Texas Stars before signing with the NHL expansion team, the Vegas Golden Knights, as a free agent in 2017. Lagacé started with their AHL affiliate, the Chicago Wolves prior to getting called up to Vegas on first on October 15, 2017, due to injuries to Marc-André Fleury and then on October 23 when Malcolm Subban was injured. His first National Hockey League game was on October 30, appearing in a 6–3 loss to the New York Islanders, allowing four goals on eleven shots in 25 minutes of playing time after replacing the injured Oscar Dansk. The following night, Lagacé made his first NHL start at Madison Square Garden against the New York Rangers, a 6–4 loss in which he stopped 32 of 37 shots. Lagacé got his first NHL win against the Ottawa Senators in a 5–4 game on November 4 while making 24 saves for the Golden Knights. On November 6, Lagacé lost his first shootout against the Toronto Maple Leafs with a 3–4 loss. On December 10, Lagacé was reassigned to the Chicago Wolves following Marc-André Fleury's return from the injured reserve. However, he was recalled back to the NHL on February 10, 2018, after Malcolm Subban was placed on injured reserve. He was reassigned to the AHL on March 15, 2018. Lagacé stayed in the AHL until Subban suffered a lower body injury in practice during the Western Conference Final, where he was then called up to serve as Fleury's backup.

Lagacé began the 2018–19 season with the Chicago Wolves after being cut from the Knights training camp. After playing in 18 games and posting a 9–6–0 record, he was recalled to the NHL on January 9. Lagacé played one game during his recall, a loss to the Carolina Hurricanes on January 30, before being reassigned to the Wolves on February 8. During the 2019 Calder Cup playoffs, Lagacé recorded the first playoff goal by a goaltender in AHL history to help the Wolves win 5–2 over the San Diego Gulls. Lagacé made a save and was the last Wolves player to touch the puck, as a San Diego player inadvertently shot the puck into his own net.

==== Boston Bruins ====
On July 1, 2019, Lagacé left the Golden Knights as a free agent following the franchise’s first two seasons. He then signed a one-year, two-way $700,000 contract with the Boston Bruins. In the 2019–20 season, Lagacé was assigned to Boston's AHL affiliate, the Providence Bruins, appearing in 33 games. Helping Providence to the second-best record in the AHL, he posted a 22–7–3 recorded with a 2.37 goals-against average, a .919 save percentage and five shutouts. His win total, goals-against average, save percentage and shutout total were all AHL career highs. He joined the Boston Bruins roster for the 2020 Stanley Cup playoffs, however did not feature in a game.

==== Pittsburgh Penguins ====
At the conclusion of his contract with the Bruins, Lagacé left as a free agent to sign a one-year, two-way contract with the Pittsburgh Penguins on October 10, 2020.

In his first and only game with the Penguins on May 8, 2021, Lagacé recorded his first career shutout against the Buffalo Sabres in the final game of the regular season. Stopping all 29 shots, Lagacé became the first goaltender in the history of the Penguins franchise to record a shutout in their first game.

==== Tampa Bay Lightning ====
Becoming a free agent the next off-season, Lagacé joined the Tampa Bay Lightning on July 28, 2021 on a one-year, two-way contract.

After starting the season for AHL affiliate Syracuse Crunch, Lagacé was recalled to the Lightning on December 27, 2021, along with teammate Hugo Alnefelt. This was in response to both Lightning goalies contracting COVID-19 and needing to sit out. Lagacé started for the Lightning the next day at home against the Montreal Canadiens. Lagacé made 27 saves on 31 shots, as the Lightning won 5-4 in overtime. He started again on December 30 against the Florida Panthers, but was removed at the end of the second period after allowing 6 goals on 27 shots. Alnefelt came in for Lagacé in the 3rd period, making his NHL debut in the process.

==== Färjestad BK ====
Following two seasons within the Lightning organization, Lagacé at the conclusion of his contract opted to embark on a European career by agreeing to a one-year contract with Swedish club, Färjestad BK of the Swedish Hockey League (SHL), on June 14, 2023. Lagacé remained with FBK for two seasons posting 29 regular season wins through 49 combined appearances.

==== Graz99ers ====
As a free agent from Färjestad BK, Lagacé opted to continue his career in Europe, agreeing to a one-year contract with Austrian club, Graz99ers of the ICEHL, on July 23, 2025.

== Personal life ==
Lagacé was born to Manon Dallaire and Gilles Lagacé. He has one younger brother, and 10 other family members. Lagacé speaks fluent French and English.

== Career statistics ==
			Regular season									Playoffs
Season	Team	League	GP	W	L	T/OT	MIN	GA	SO	GAA	SV%	GP	W	L	MIN	GA	SO	GAA	SV%
2010–11	Prince Edward Island Rocket	QMJHL	18	8	4	0	870	52	1	3.59	.884	—	—	—	—	—	—	—	—
2011–12	Prince Edward Island Rocket	QMJHL	56	12	34	5	2912	219	1	4.51	.867	—	—	—	—	—	—	—	—
2012–13	Prince Edward Island Rocket	QMJHL	33	13	12	1	1571	106	1	4.05	.869	1	0	0	27	1	0	2.19	.857
2013–14	Cape Breton Screaming Eagles	QMJHL	8	3	3	1	464	25	0	3.23	.887	—	—	—	—	—	—	—	—
2013–14	Shawinigan Cataractes	QMJHL	3	1	2	0	180	12	1	4.00	.890	—	—	—	—	—	—	—	—
2013–14	Sherbrooke Phoenix	QMJHL	15	2	9	3	827	56	0	4.06	.887	—	—	—	—	—	—	—	—
2014–15	Texas Stars	AHL	1	0	0	0	17	1	0	3.55	.900	—	—	—	—	—	—	—	—
2014–15	Missouri Mavericks	ECHL	15	5	6	3	779	39	1	3.01	.885	—	—	—	—	—	—	—	—
2014–15	Bakersfield Condors	ECHL	13	6	4	1	718	32	1	2.68	.915	—	—	—	—	—	—	—	—
2015–16	Texas Stars	AHL	36	19	10	3	2051	99	1	2.90	.913	2	0	1	88	4	0	2.74	.886
2015–16	Idaho Steelheads	ECHL	11	3	5	2	582	30	0	3.09	.886	—	—	—	—	—	—	—	—
2016–17	Texas Stars	AHL	32	11	12	2	1567	93	1	3.56	.883	—	—	—	—	—	—	—	—
2017–18	Chicago Wolves	AHL	23	14	5	2	1350	64	0	2.84	.905	1	0	1	117	4	0	2.04	.947
2017–18	Vegas Golden Knights	NHL	16	6	7	1	874	57	0	3.91	.867	—	—	—	—	—	—	—	—
2018–19	Chicago Wolves	AHL	33	16	10	6	1973	80	1	2.43	.914	3	2	1	180	10	0	3.34	.865
2018–19	Vegas Golden Knights	NHL	1	0	1	0	60	4	0	4.03	.871	—	—	—	—	—	—	—	—
2019–20	Providence Bruins	AHL	33	22	7	3	1873	74	5	2.37	.919	—	—	—	—	—	—	—	—
2020–21	Wilkes-Barre/Scranton Penguins	AHL	9	4	3	2	548	21	0	2.30	.907	—	—	—	—	—	—	—	—
2020–21	Pittsburgh Penguins	NHL	1	1	0	0	60	0	1	0.00	1.000	—	—	—	—	—	—	—	—
2021–22	Syracuse Crunch	AHL	36	23	9	2	1977	76	4	2.31	.910	5	2	3	257	11	0	2.57	.911
2021–22	Tampa Bay Lightning	NHL	2	1	1	0	99	10	0	6.11	.828	—	—	—	—	—	—	—	—
2022–23	Syracuse Crunch	AHL	41	17	12	8	2,262	126	1	3.34	.888	5	2	2	275	15	1	3.27	.858
2023–24	Färjestad BK	SHL	18	12	6	0	1092	37	2	2.03	.919	1	0	0	20	1	0	3.00	.857
2024–25	Färjestad BK	SHL	31	17	10	0	1750	77	2	2.64	.886	1	1	0	20	1	0	3.00	.667
NHL totals			20	8	9	1	1,092	71	1	3.90	.870	—	—	—	—	—	—	—	—
