= 2017–18 Tampa Bay Lightning season =

National Hockey League team season

2017–18 Tampa Bay Lightning
- Atlantic Division champions
- Division: 1st Atlantic
- Conference: 1st Eastern
- 2017–18 record: 54–23–5
- Home record: 29–10–2
- Road record: 25–13–3
- Goals for: 296
- Goals against: 236

Team information
- General manager: Steve Yzerman
- Coach: Jon Cooper
- Captain: Steven Stamkos
- Alternate captains: Ryan Callahan; Victor Hedman; Ondrej Palat; Anton Stralman
- Arena: Amalie Arena
- Average attendance: 19,092
- Minor league affiliate: Syracuse Crunch (AHL)

Team leaders
- Goals: Nikita Kucherov (39)
- Assists: Nikita Kucherov (61)
- Points: Nikita Kucherov (100)
- Penalty minutes: Steven Stamkos (72)
- Plus/minus: Yanni Gourde (+34)
- Wins: Andrei Vasilevskiy (44)
- Goals against average: Andrei Vasilevskiy (2.62)

The 2017–18 Tampa Bay Lightning season was the 26th season for the National Hockey League (NHL) franchise that was established on December 16, 1991.

== Off-season ==
=== April ===
On April 9, 2017, the Lightning's 2016–17 season came to an end when they defeated the Buffalo Sabres 4–2 at Amalie Arena. The Lightning were eliminated from playoff contention the night before when the Toronto Maple Leafs defeated the Pittsburgh Penguins 5–3.

On April 23, 2017, the Lightning signed Boris Katchouk to a three-year, entry-level contract. Katchouk posted career highs in goals (35), assists (29) and points (64). Katchouk said he had "dreamed of this for a long time" after signing the contract. Katchouk joined the Syracuse Crunch of the American Hockey League (AHL) after the Sault Ste. Marie Greyhounds were eliminated from the Ontario Hockey League (OHL) playoffs.

On April 25, 2017, Tanner Richard left the Syracuse Crunch to join the Switzerland men's national ice hockey team to try to earn a spot for the 2017 IIHF World Championship. It was unknown at the time whether Richard would rejoin the Crunch if the team remained in the playoffs.

On April 28, 2017, Richard agreed to a two-year contract with Genève-Servette HC of the Swiss National League A (NLA).

=== May ===
On May 15, 2017, the Lightning announced it had signed Taylor Raddysh to a three-year, entry-level contract. Raddysh led the OHL's Erie Otters offense the past season with 109 points in 58 games.

On May 29, 2017, the NHL announced the Lightning would host the 2018 NHL All-Star Game at Amalie Arena. The Lightning had previously served as host of the NHL All-Star game back in 1999, which notably featured Wayne Gretzky's final appearance in an NHL All-Star Game.

On May 31, 2017, the Lightning announced it had traded Bokondji Imama to the Los Angeles Kings in exchange for a conditional seventh-round pick in the 2018 NHL entry draft. For the condition to be satisfied, the Kings had to sign Imama to an NHL contract before the June 1, 2pm deadline. The Kings satisfied the requirements of the conditional seventh-round pick when it signed Imama to a three-year, entry-level contract.

=== June ===
On June 15, 2017, the Lightning announced a blockbuster trade that sent forward Jonathan Drouin to the Montreal Canadiens and a conditional sixth-round pick in the 2018 NHL Entry Draft in exchange for defenseman Mikhail Sergachev and a conditional second-round pick in the 2018 Draft. In 2016–17, Sergachev played in 50 games with the OHL's Windsor Spitfires, recording 10 goals and 43 points. Sergachev also helped Windsor capture the 2017 Memorial Cup as Canadian Hockey League (CHL) champions.

On June 18, 2017, the Lightning announced its list of protected players for the 2017 NHL expansion draft. The Lightning chose to protect forwards Steven Stamkos, Nikita Kucherov, Ryan Callahan, Tyler Johnson, Ondrej Palat, Alex Killorn, Vladislav Namestnikov; defensemen Victor Hedman, Anton Stralman and Braydon Coburn; and goaltender Andrei Vasilevskiy. Vegas was permitted to negotiate with any unprotected players until June 21. If a player was signed, then it counted as Vegas' expansion draft pick. Barring any trades, Vegas would create its inaugural roster by selecting one player from every NHL club.

On June 19, 2017, Jokerit of the Kontinental Hockey League (KHL) announced it had signed Lightning forward prospect Henri Ikonen to a two-year contract.

On June 20, 2017, Lausanne HC of the NLA announced it had signed Lightning prospect Joel Vermin to a five-year contract that contains an NHL clause for a one-way deal. The deal had been previously reported in January, however the terms of the deal and which club had signed him was unknown. Vermin has played in 24 NHL games and recorded four assists. He has primarily played in the AHL, where he has made 185 appearances, scoring 44 goals and 55 assists.

On June 21, 2017, the Vegas Golden Knights selected Lightning defensemen Jason Garrison in the 2017 NHL Expansion Draft. In order to facilitate Vegas selecting Garrison, the Lightning traded prospect Nikita Gusev, a second-round pick in the 2017 NHL entry draft and a fourth-round pick in the 2018 Draft. In so doing, the Lightning were also able to protect defensive prospects Jake Dotchin and Slater Koekkoek. The selection of Garrison also freed up $4.6 million in salary cap for the 2017–18 season.

On June 22, 2017, it was leaked by the media that the Lightning were re-signing goaltender Peter Budaj to a two-year contract extension. Budaj joined the Lightning as part of the trade that sent Lightning starting goaltender Ben Bishop to the Los Angeles Kings (along with a fifth-round pick in the 2017 NHL Entry Draft) in exchange for prospect Erik Cernak, a seventh-round pick in 2017 and a conditional pick in 2017.

On June 25, 2017, the Lightning announced the schedule and tentative roster for their annual developmental cap at The Ice Sports Forum. The camp will feature some of the Lightning's top prospects, along with the 2017 Draftees and invitees. Notable prospects attending this year includes Mikhail Sergachev, Brett Howden, Anthony Cirelli, Mathieu Joseph, Taylor Raddysh and Conner Ingram. Also in attendance will be all six players selected at the 2017 NHL Entry Draft, including first round pick Callan Foote.

On June 26, 2017, the Lightning announced it had re-signed defenseman Andrej Sustr to a one-year, $1.95 million contract. Sustr skated in 80 games last season, recording 14 points.

Shortly after Sustr's extension was announced by the Lightning, the team announced it had re-signed forward Yanni Gourde to a two-year, $1 million contract extension. Gourde made 20 appearances in 2016–17, scoring six goals.

Later in the afternoon, the Lightning announced it had issued qualifying offers to nine players: Michael Bournival, Jake Dotchin, Kristers Gudlevskis, Tyler Johnson, Tye McGinn, Ondrej Palat, Matthew Peca and Tanner Richard. In so doing, the Lightning retained the rights to these players. Notable players not being issued qualifying offers by the Lightning were prospects Dylan Blujus, Jonathan Racine and Henri Ikonen. Any player not tenured a qualifying offer became an unrestricted free agent.

On June 28, 2017, the Lightning announced it had re-signed forward Cory Conacher to a two-year, $1.3 million contract extension. Conacher appeared in 11 games in 2016–17 with the Lightning, recording a goal and three assists. Conacher predominately played for the Crunch this past season. In his stint with the Crunch, Conacher recorded 17 goals and 43 assists. Additionally, Conacher led all players in scoring in the 2017 Calder Cup playoffs with 12 goals and 28 points.

A short time after the announcement of Conacher being re-signed, the Lightning announced it had re-signed Gabriel Dumont to a two-year, $1.3 million contract extension. Dumont appeared in 39 games with the Lightning in 2016–17, recording two goals and two assists. In the AHL, Dumont played in 20 games with the Crunch, scoring five goals and five assists. Additionally, Dumont appeared in all 22 playoffs games with the Crunch, where he recorded 5 goals and 11 points.

On June 29, 2017, the Lightning announced a massive $6 million renovation to The Ice Sports Forum. The Ice Sports Forum owner Tom Bradley will also be contributing $500,000 to the project. As part of the expansion, the Lightning extended their lease for another ten years. The renovation will increase the size of the facility from roughly 14,500 square feet to 18,000 square feet.

Later that afternoon, the Lightning announced the signing of forward prospect Alexander Volkov to a three-year, entry-level contract. Volkov played for SKA-1946 St. Petersburg the past four seasons. During that time, he played in 128 games and recorded 35 goals and 26 assists. Volkov is expected to play for the Syracuse Crunch in upcoming 2017–18 season.

=== July ===
On July 1, 2017, the Lightning announced it had signed prospect Oleg Sosunov to a three-year, entry-level contract. Sosunov was recently selected 39th overall in the 2017 Canadian Hockey League Import Draft by the Western Hockey League (WHL)'s Moose Jaw Warriors. Sosunov will be playing for the Warriors in the upcoming 2017–18 season.

The Lightning acquired forward Carter Verhaeghe from the New York Islanders in exchange for goaltender Kristers Gudlevskis. Verhaeghe is a former third-round pick of the Toronto Maple Leafs. Verhaeghe appeared in 45 games with the AHL's Bridgeport Sound Tigers, where he scored 16 goals and 13 assists.

The Lightning announced the signing of goaltender Michael Leighton to a one-year, two-way contract. Leighton played in four games with the Carolina Hurricanes this past season. Leighton also spent time with the Hurricanes' AHL affiliate, the Charlotte Checkers, where he played in 23 games. He had a record of 11–7–3 in those games, along with a 2.17 goals-against average (GAA) and a .921 save percentage. Leighton is expected to start the season as the Syracuse Crunch's starting goaltender.

The Lightning announced the signing of defenseman Mat Bodie to a one-year, two-way contract. In 2016–17, Bodie played for both the AHL's Rochester Americans and Hartford Wolf Pack. His season totals were 10 goals and 39 points, both career highs.

The Lightning announced the signing of left wing Alex Gallant to a one-year, two-way contract. Gallant played in 29 games with the AHL's San Jose Barracuda in 2016–17, recording two assists. Gallant has also skated in 56 career AHL games, scoring one goal and two assists.

The Lightning announced it had signed defenseman Jamie McBain to a one-year, two-way contract. McBain spent the duration of the 2016–17 season with the Tucson Roadrunners. McBain is expected to provide Syracuse with a veteran presence, having played in 348 career NHL games.

The Lightning announced the free agent signing of defenseman Dan Girardi to a two-year contract valued at $3 million per season. Girardi had spent his entire career with the New York Rangers before signing with the Lightning. Girardi is a veteran of 788 career NHL games. During that span Girardi has scored 46 goals and 230 points.

The final signing announced by the Lightning was free agent left wing Chris Kunitz to a one-year contract was worth $2 million. Kunitz brings a plethora of playoff experience, having won four Stanley Cups. Kunitz's career has spanned 884 career NHL games where he has 250 goals and 580 points.

On July 10, 2017, the Lightning announced it had re-signed restricted free agent forward Tyler Johnson to a seven-year, $35 million contract extension. Johnson has spent his entire NHL career with the Lightning since signing with them as undrafted free agent. Over five season Johnson has recorded 89 goals and 122 assists.

On July 14, 2017, the Lightning announced the re-signing of restricted free agent forward Ondrej Palat to a five-year, $26.5 million contract extension. Since being selected in the seventh round of the 2011 NHL entry draft, Palat has scored 74 goals and 144 assists over 307 games.

On July 18, 2017, the Lightning announced it had re-signed forward Michael Bournival to a one-year contract extension. In 2016–17, Bournival played in 19 games with the Lightning last season and 38 with the Crunch. In his career, Bournival has played in 108 career NHL games where he has recorded 12 goals and 22 points.

=== August ===
On August 17, 2017, the Lightning announced it had re-signed forward Tye McGinn to a one-year, two-way contract. McGinn was limited to just 21 games in 2016–17 due to an injury. He recorded 10 goals and 19 points.

On August 29, 2017, the Lightning announced its annual prospect tournament roster. Prospects of note in attendance are Brett Howden, Callan Foote, Mikhail Sergachev, Taylor Raddysh, and Anthony Cirelli. Also of note, the younger brother of Lightning forward Cory Conacher, Shane Conacher, is attending as an invitee. The prospect tournament will take place at Germain Arena, which is located in Estero, Florida. The other teams participating in the tournament are the Florida Panthers, the Nashville Predators and Washington Capitals. The tournament is set to run from September 9 to 12, inclusive.

== Training camp ==
=== September ===
On September 6, 2017, the Lightning announced the annual prospect tournament had been canceled due to Hurricane Irma. The Lightning opted to play the Nashville Predators' prospects in a series of scrimmages over three days at Ford Ice Center in Antioch, Tennessee.

On September 13, 2017, the Lightning announced its 63-man roster for training camp. There were six training camp invitees this year, which were Shane Conacher, Kevin Hancock, Kevin Lynch, Reid McNeill, Joseph Raaymakers and Nicola Riopel. The roster also features all the prospects that participated in the scrimmages with the Predators the prior weekend.

On September 18, 2017, Brian Hart and Cameron Darcy both cleared unconditional waivers. This terminated the remaining year on both players contract, which frees up two contracts as part of the team's 50-contract limit. On September 20, 2017, the Lightning announced the first round of players cut from their training camp roster. Kevin Hancock and Joseph Raaymakers were released from their tryout agreements. Alexey Lipanov, Christopher Paquette, Taylor Raddysh, Christopher Paquette and Oleg Sosunov were reassigned to their respective junior clubs.

On September 21, 2017, the Lightning announced that it had trimmed down its training camp roster by three players. Boris Katchouk, Callan Foote and Libor Hajek were assigned to their junior clubs for the upcoming season.

On September 23, 2017, the Lightning made another round of roster cuts, which reduced the training camp roster to 44 players. Shane Conacher, Kevin Lynch, Reid McNeill were released from their tryout agreements. Otto Somppi was assigned to the Quebec Major Junior Hockey League (QMJHL)'s Halifax Mooseheads. Alex Gallant, Carter Verhaghe, Mat Bodie, Matthew Spencer, Connor Ingram and Michael Leighton were assigned to the Syracuse Crunch.

On September 25, 2017, the Lightning announced it was retiring Vincent Lecavalier's number 4 jersey on February 10, 2018. The retirement ceremony will take place before the game against the Los Angeles Kings, the club Lecavalier finished his career with. That same day, the Lightning announced it had reduced its training camp roster down to 30 players. Former first round pick Brett Howden was assigned to his junior club in the WHL, while Anthony Cirelli, Adam Erne, Mathieu Joseph, Tye McGinn, Matthew Peca, Mitchell Stephens, Dennis Yan, Erik Cernak, Jamie McBain, Ben Thomas and Daniel Walcott were reassigned to Syracuse.

On September 28, 2017, the Lightning announced it had signed forward prospect Alexy Lipanov to a three-year, entry-level contract.

On September 29, 2017, the Lightning announced it had reduced its training camp roster by one player: Alexander Volkov, the Lightning's 2017 second-round draft pick, was reassigned to Syracuse.

=== October ===
On October 1, 2017, the Lightning announced that it had reassigned goaltender Nicola Riopel to the Adirondack Thunder of the ECHL.

On October 2, 2017, the Lightning placed on Cory Conacher on waivers for the purpose of reassigning him to the Crunch. Conacher was the final roster cut of training camp. The Lightning will started the season with thirteen forwards and eight defensemen. The forward group consisted of J. T. Brown, Ryan Callahan, Gabriel Dumont, Yanni Gourde, Tyler Johnson, Alex Killorn, Nikita Kucherov, Chris Kunitz, Vladislav Namestnikov, Ondrej Palat, Cedric Paquette, Brayden Point and Steven Stamkos. The defensemen on the opening night roster were Braydon Coburn, Jake Dotchin, Dan Girardi, Victor Hedman, Slater Koekkoek, Mikhail Sergachev, Anton Stralman and Andrej Sustr. Forwards Michael Bournival, Erik Condra, Jonne Tammela, Carter Verhaeghe and defenseman Dominik Masin remained with the team on injured reserve.

== Standings ==
Atlantic Division
Pos	Team	GP	W	L	OTL	ROW	GF	GA	GD	Pts
1	z – Tampa Bay Lightning	82	54	23	5	48	296	236	+60	113
2	x – Boston Bruins	82	50	20	12	47	270	214	+56	112
3	x – Toronto Maple Leafs	82	49	26	7	42	277	232	+45	105
4	Florida Panthers	82	44	30	8	41	248	246	+2	96
5	Detroit Red Wings	82	30	39	13	25	217	255	−38	73
6	Montreal Canadiens	82	29	40	13	27	209	264	−55	71
7	Ottawa Senators	82	28	43	11	26	221	291	−70	67
8	Buffalo Sabres	82	25	45	12	24	199	280	−81	62

Source: National Hockey League
x – Clinched playoff spot; z – Clinched conference

== Schedule and results ==
=== Preseason ===
2017 preseason game log: 3–4–0 (Home: 1–2–0; Road: 2–2–0)

Game	Date	Opponent	Score	OT	Decision	Location	Attendance	Record	Recap
1	September 19	Carolina Hurricanes	1–2		Leighton	Amalie Arena	11,454	0–1–0	
2	September 20	@ Carolina Hurricanes	4–3		Leighton	PNC Arena	6,486	1–1–0	
3	September 22	Nashville Predators	3–1		Vasilevskiy	Amalie Arena	15,504	2–1–0	
4	September 24	Florida Panthers	2–4		Budaj	Amalie Arena	12,911	2–2–0	
5	September 26	@ Florida Panthers	2–4		Vasilevskiy	BB&T Center	8,242	2–3–0	
6	September 28	@ Florida Panthers	2–5		Budaj	BB&T Center	13,279	2–4–0	
7	September 30	@ Nashville Predators	3–2	OT	Vasilevskiy	Bridgestone Arena	17,133	3–4–0	

Lightning score listed first;

Win Loss Overtime/shootout loss

=== Regular season ===
2017–18 regular season game log
October: 10–2–1, 21 points (Home: 6–1–0; Road: 4–1–1)

Game	Date	Opponent	Score	OT	Decision	Location	Attendance	Record	Points	Recap
1	October 6	Florida Panthers	5–3		Vasilevskiy	Amalie Arena	19,092	1–0–0	2	
2	October 7	@ Florida Panthers	4–5		Vasilevskiy	BB&T Center	16,871	1–1–0	2	
3	October 9	Washington Capitals	4–3	OT	Vasilevskiy	Amalie Arena	19,092	2–1–0	4	
4	October 12	Pittsburgh Penguins	5–4		Vasilevskiy	Amalie Arena	19,092	3–1–0	6	
5	October 14	St. Louis Blues	2–1		Vasilevskiy	Amalie Arena	19,092	4–1–0	8	
6	October 16	@ Detroit Red Wings	3–2		Vasilevskiy	Little Caesars Arena	19,515	5–1–0	10	
7	October 17	@ New Jersey Devils	4–5	SO	Budaj	Prudential Center	13,176	5–1–1	11	
8	October 19	@ Columbus Blue Jackets	2–0		Vasilevskiy	Nationwide Arena	13,155	6–1–1	13	
9	October 21	Pittsburgh Penguins	7–1		Vasilevskiy	Amalie Arena	19,092	7–1–1	15	
10	October 24	@ Carolina Hurricanes	5–1		Vasilevskiy	PNC Arena	10,498	8–1–1	17	
11	October 26	Detroit Red Wings	3–2		Vasilevskiy	Amalie Arena	19,092	9–1–1	19	
12	October 28	Anaheim Ducks	1–4		Budaj	Amalie Arena	19,092	9–2–1	19	
13	October 30	@ Florida Panthers	8–5		Vasilevskiy	BB&T Center	9,493	10–2–1	21	

November: 7–4–1, 15 points (Home: 3–1–1; Road: 4–3–0)

Game	Date	Opponent	Score	OT	Decision	Location	Attendance	Record	Points	Recap
14	November 2	New York Rangers	1–2	OT	Vasilevskiy	Amalie Arena	19,092	10–2–2	22	
15	November 4	Columbus Blue Jackets	5–4	SO	Vasilevskiy	Amalie Arena	19,092	11–2–2	24	
16	November 8	@ San Jose Sharks	5–1		Vasilevskiy	SAP Center	17,044	12–2–2	26	
17	November 9	@ Los Angeles Kings	5–2		Budaj	Staples Center	18,230	13–2–2	28	
18	November 12	@ Anaheim Ducks	2–1		Vasilevskiy	Honda Center	15,707	14–2–2	30	
19	November 16	Dallas Stars	6–1		Vasilevskiy	Amalie Arena	19,092	15–2–2	32	
20	November 18	New York Islanders	3–5		Vasilevskiy	Amalie Arena	19,092	15–3–2	32	
21	November 22	Chicago Blackhawks	3–2	OT	Vasilevskiy	Amalie Arena	19,092	16–3–2	34	
22	November 24	@ Washington Capitals	1–3		Vasilevskiy	Capital One Arena	18,506	16–4–2	34	
23	November 25	@ Pittsburgh Penguins	2–5		Budaj	PPG Paints Arena	18,659	16–5–2	34	
24	November 28	@ Buffalo Sabres	2–0		Vasilevskiy	KeyBank Center	17,569	17–5–2	36	
25	November 29	@ Boston Bruins	2–3		Vasilevskiy	TD Garden	17,565	17–6–2	36	

December: 11–2–0, 22 points (Home: 7–1–0; Road: 4–1–0)

Game	Date	Opponent	Score	OT	Decision	Location	Attendance	Record	Points	Recap
26	December 2	San Jose Sharks	5–2		Vasilevskiy	Amalie Arena	19,092	18–6–2	38	
27	December 5	New York Islanders	6–2		Vasilevskiy	Amalie Arena	19,092	19–6–2	40	
28	December 7	Colorado Avalanche	5–2		Budaj	Amalie Arena	19,092	20–6–2	42	
29	December 9	Winnipeg Jets	4–3	OT	Vasilevskiy	Amalie Arena	19,092	21–6–2	44	
30	December 12	@ St. Louis Blues	3–0		Vasilevskiy	Scottrade Center	18,290	22–6–2	46	
31	December 14	@ Arizona Coyotes	4–1		Vasilevskiy	Gila River Arena	11,591	23–6–2	48	
32	December 16	@ Colorado Avalanche	6–5		Budaj	Pepsi Center	16,956	24–6–2	50	
33	December 19	@ Vegas Golden Knights	3–4		Vasilevskiy	T-Mobile Arena	17,813	24–7–2	50	
34	December 21	Ottawa Senators	4–3	SO	Vasilevskiy	Amalie Arena	19,092	25–7–2	52	
35	December 23	Minnesota Wild	3–0		Vasilevskiy	Amalie Arena	19,092	26–7–2	54	
36	December 28	Montreal Canadiens	3–1		Vasilevskiy	Amalie Arena	19,092	27–7–2	56	
37	December 29	Philadelphia Flyers	3–5		Budaj	Amalie Arena	19,092	27–8–2	56	
38	December 31	@ Columbus Blue Jackets	5–0		Vasilevskiy	Nationwide Arena	18,878	28–8–2	58	

January: 6–5–1, 13 points (Home: 1–2–0; Road: 5–3–1)

Game	Date	Opponent	Score	OT	Decision	Location	Attendance	Record	Points	Recap
39	January 2	@ Toronto Maple Leafs	2–0		Vasilevskiy	Air Canada Centre	19,344	29–8–2	60	
40	January 4	@ Montreal Canadiens	1–2	SO	Vasilevskiy	Bell Centre	21,302	29–8–3	61	
41	January 6	@ Ottawa Senators	3–6		Vasilevskiy	Canadian Tire Centre	16,247	29–9–3	61	
42	January 7	@ Detroit Red Wings	5–2		Domingue	Little Caesars Arena	19,515	30–9–3	63	
43	January 9	Carolina Hurricanes	5–4		Vasilevskiy	Amalie Arena	19,092	31–9–3	65	
44	January 11	Calgary Flames	1–5		Vasilevskiy	Amalie Arena	19,092	31–10–3	65	
45	January 18	Vegas Golden Knights	1–4		Vasilevskiy	Amalie Arena	19,092	31–11–3	65	
46	January 20	@ Minnesota Wild	2–5		Vasilevskiy	Xcel Energy Center	19,007	31–12–3	65	
47	January 22	@ Chicago Blackhawks	2–0		Vasilevskiy	United Center	21,662	32–12–3	67	
48	January 23	@ Nashville Predators	4–3	OT	Domingue	Bridgestone Arena	17,332	33–12–3	69	
49	January 25	@ Philadelphia Flyers	5–1		Vasilevskiy	Wells Fargo Center	19,489	34–12–3	71	
All-Star Break (January 26–29)
50	January 30	@ Winnipeg Jets	1–3		Domingue	Bell MTS Place	15,321	34–13–3	71	

February: 9–4–1, 19 points (Home: 4–1–1; Road: 5–3–0)

Game	Date	Opponent	Score	OT	Decision	Location	Attendance	Record	Points	Recap
51	February 1	@ Calgary Flames	7–4		Vasilevskiy	Scotiabank Saddledome	19,000	35–13–3	73	
52	February 3	@ Vancouver Canucks	4–2		Vasilevskiy	Rogers Arena	18,865	36–13–3	75	
53	February 5	@ Edmonton Oilers	2–6		Vasilevskiy	Rogers Place	18,347	36–14–3	75	
54	February 8	Vancouver Canucks	5–2		Vasilevskiy	Amalie Arena	19,092	37–14–3	77	
55	February 10	Los Angeles Kings	4–3		Vasilevskiy	Amalie Arena	19,092	38–14–3	79	
56	February 12	@ Toronto Maple Leafs	3–4		Vasilevskiy	Air Canada Centre	19,112	38–15–3	79	
57	February 13	@ Buffalo Sabres	3–5		Domingue	KeyBank Center	16,530	38–16–3	79	
58	February 15	Detroit Red Wings	4–1		Vasilevskiy	Amalie Arena	19,092	39–16–3	81	
59	February 17	New Jersey Devils	3–4		Vasilevskiy	Amalie Arena	19,092	39–17–3	81	
60	February 20	@ Washington Capitals	4–2		Vasilevskiy	Capital One Arena	18,506	40–17–3	83	
61	February 22	@ Ottawa Senators	4–3		Domingue	Canadian Tire Centre	16,204	41–17–3	85	
62	February 24	@ Montreal Canadiens	4–3	SO	Vasilevskiy	Bell Centre	21,203	42–17–3	87	
63	February 26	Toronto Maple Leafs	4–3	SO	Vasilevskiy	Amalie Arena	19,092	43–17–3	89	
64	February 28	Buffalo Sabres	1–2	OT	Vasilevskiy	Amalie Arena	19,092	43–17–4	90	

March: 9–5–0, 18 points (Home: 6–3–0; Road: 3–2–0)

Game	Date	Opponent	Score	OT	Decision	Location	Attendance	Record	Points	Recap
65	March 1	@ Dallas Stars	5–4	OT	Domingue	American Airlines Center	17,337	44–17–4	92	
66	March 3	Philadelphia Flyers	7–6	SO	Vasilevskiy	Amalie Arena	19,092	45–17–4	94	
67	March 6	Florida Panthers	5–4	OT	Vasilevskiy	Amalie Arena	19,092	46–17–4	96	
68	March 8	New York Rangers	5–3		Vasilevskiy	Amalie Arena	19,092	47–17–4	98	
69	March 10	Montreal Canadiens	3–2	SO	Domingue	Amalie Arena	19,092	48–17–4	100	
70	March 13	Ottawa Senators	4–7		Vasilevskiy	Amalie Arena	19,092	48–18–4	100	
71	March 17	Boston Bruins	0–3		Vasilevskiy	Amalie Arena	19,092	48–19–4	100	
72	March 18	Edmonton Oilers	3–1		Domingue	Amalie Arena	19,092	49–19–4	102	
73	March 20	Toronto Maple Leafs	4–3		Vasilevskiy	Amalie Arena	19,092	50–19–4	104	
74	March 22	@ New York Islanders	7–6		Vasilevskiy	Barclays Center	10,354	51–19–4	106	
75	March 24	@ New Jersey Devils	1–2		Vasilevskiy	Prudential Center	16,514	51–20–4	106	
76	March 26	Arizona Coyotes	1–4		Domingue	Amalie Arena	19,092	51–21–4	106	
77	March 29	@ Boston Bruins	2–4		Vasilevskiy	TD Garden	17,565	51–22–4	106	
78	March 30	@ New York Rangers	7–3		Domingue	Madison Square Garden	18,006	52–22–4	108	

April: 2–1–1, 5 points (Home: 2–1–0; Road: 0–0–1)

Game	Date	Opponent	Score	OT	Decision	Location	Attendance	Record	Points	Recap
79	April 1	Nashville Predators	1–4		Vasilevskiy	Amalie Arena	19,092	52–23–4	108	
80	April 3	Boston Bruins	4–0		Vasilevskiy	Amalie Arena	19,092	53–23–4	110	
81	April 6	Buffalo Sabres	7–5		Vasilevskiy	Amalie Arena	19,092	54–23–4	112	
82	April 7	@ Carolina Hurricanes	2–3	OT	Domingue	PNC Arena	15,402	54–23–5	113	

Lightning score listed first;

Win (2 points) Loss (0 points) Overtime/shootout loss (1 point)

=== Playoffs ===
2018 Stanley Cup playoffs
Eastern Conference First Round vs. New Jersey Devils (WC2) – Tampa Bay wins series 4–1

Game	Date	Opponent	Score	OT	Decision	Location	Attendance	Series	Recap
1	April 12	New Jersey Devils	5–2		Vasilevskiy	Amalie Arena	19,092	1–0	
2	April 14	New Jersey Devils	5–3		Vasilevskiy	Amalie Arena	19,092	2–0	
3	April 16	@ New Jersey Devils	2–5		Vasilevskiy	Prudential Center	16,514	2–1	
4	April 18	@ New Jersey Devils	3–1		Vasilevskiy	Prudential Center	16,514	3–1	
5	April 21	New Jersey Devils	3–1		Vasilevskiy	Amalie Arena	19,092	4–1	

Eastern Conference Second Round vs. Boston Bruins (A2) – Tampa Bay wins series 4–1

Game	Date	Opponent	Score	OT	Decision	Location	Attendance	Series	Recap
1	April 28	Boston Bruins	2–6		Vasilevskiy	Amalie Arena	19,092	0–1	
2	April 30	Boston Bruins	4–2		Vasilevskiy	Amalie Arena	19,092	1–1	
3	May 2	@ Boston Bruins	4–1		Vasilevskiy	TD Garden	17,565	2–1	
4	May 4	@ Boston Bruins	4–3	OT	Vasilevskiy	TD Garden	17,565	3–1	
5	May 6	Boston Bruins	3–1		Vasilevskiy	Amalie Arena	19,092	4–1	

Eastern Conference Finals vs. Washington Capitals (M1) – Washington wins series 4–3

Game	Date	Opponent	Score	OT	Decision	Location	Attendance	Series	Recap
1	May 11	Washington Capitals	2–4		Vasilevskiy	Amalie Arena	19,092	0–1	
2	May 13	Washington Capitals	2–6		Vasilevskiy	Amalie Arena	19,092	0–2	
3	May 15	@ Washington Capitals	4–2		Vasilevskiy	Capital One Arena	18,506	1–2	
4	May 17	@ Washington Capitals	4–2		Vasilevskiy	Capital One Arena	18,506	2–2	
5	May 19	Washington Capitals	3–2		Vasilevskiy	Amalie Arena	19,092	3–2	
6	May 21	@ Washington Capitals	0–3		Vasilevskiy	Capital One Arena	18,506	3–3	
7	May 23	Washington Capitals	0–4		Vasilevskiy	Amalie Arena	19,092	3–4	

Lightning score listed first;

Win Loss If necessary

== Player stats ==
May 23, 2018

=== Skaters ===
Regular season
Player	GP	G	A	Pts	+/−	PIM
Nikita Kucherov	80	39	61	100	15	42
Steven Stamkos	78	27	59	86	18	72
Brayden Point	82	32	34	66	18	24
Yanni Gourde	82	25	39	64	34	50
Victor Hedman	77	17	46	63	32	54
Tyler Johnson	81	21	29	50	3	24
Alex Killorn	82	15	32	47	22	45
Vladislav Namestnikov^{‡}	62	20	24	44	11	35
Mikhail Sergachev	79	9	31	40	11	38
Ondrej Palat	56	11	24	35	16	6
Chris Kunitz	82	13	16	29	8	35
J. T. Miller^{†}	18	10	8	18	−3	12
Dan Girardi	77	6	12	18	18	27
Ryan Callahan	67	5	13	18	−4	29
Anton Stralman	80	4	14	18	29	18
Braydon Coburn	72	1	14	15	3	40
Cory Conacher	36	8	4	12	0	24
Anthony Cirelli	18	5	6	11	11	6
Jake Dotchin	48	3	8	11	17	38
Cedric Paquette	56	5	4	9	−5	41
Slater Koekkoek	35	4	4	8	4	18
Andrej Sustr	44	2	5	7	−5	18
Matthew Peca	10	2	3	5	6	0
J. T. Brown^{‡}	24	1	3	4	−1	12
Adam Erne	23	3	1	4	−1	11
Ryan McDonagh^{†}	14	2	1	3	1	0
Gabriel Dumont^{‡†}	7	0	0	0	0	4
Michael Bournival	5	0	0	0	0	0

Playoffs
Player	GP	G	A	Pts	+/−	PIM
Nikita Kucherov	17	7	10	17	−6	10
Steven Stamkos	17	7	9	16	−1	4
Brayden Point	17	7	9	16	−6	10
Ondrej Palat	17	6	6	12	−1	2
Victor Hedman	17	1	10	11	−4	10
Tyler Johnson	17	3	5	8	−1	6
J. T. Miller	17	2	6	8	−4	15
Alex Killorn	17	5	2	7	4	12
Yanni Gourde	17	2	5	7	0	8
Mikhail Sergachev	17	2	3	5	1	12
Anton Stralman	17	1	4	5	−3	8
Ryan McDonagh	17	0	5	5	2	6
Dan Girardi	17	2	1	3	3	2
Anthony Cirelli	17	2	1	3	1	4
Ryan Callahan	15	2	1	3	1	4
Cedric Paquette	17	1	1	2	−1	37
Braydon Coburn	17	0	2	2	1	19
Chris Kunitz	17	0	1	1	−1	16
Cory Conacher	2	0	0	0	−1	10

=== Goaltenders ===
Regular season
Player	GP	GS	TOI	W	L	OT	GA	GAA	SA	SV%	SO	G	A	PIM
Andrei Vasilevskiy	65	64	3826	44	17	3	167	2.62	2075	.920	8	0	2	14
Louis Domingue^{†}	12	11	687	7	3	1	33	2.89	384	.914	0	0	0	2
Peter Budaj	8	7	431	3	3	1	27	3.77	217	.876	0	0	0	0

Playoffs
Player	GP	GS	TOI	W	L	GA	GAA	SA	SV%	SO	G	A	PIM
Andrei Vasilevskiy	17	17	1000	11	6	43	2.58	524	.918	0	0	0	2
Louis Domingue	1	0	19	0	0	0	0.00	7	1.000	0	0	0	0

^{†}Denotes player spent time with another team before joining Tampa Bay. Stats reflect time with Tampa Bay only.
^{‡}Traded from Tampa Bay mid-season.
Bold/italics denotes franchise record

== Suspensions/fines ==
Player	Explanation	Length	Salary	Date issued
Steven Stamkos	Fined $5,000 for unsportsmanlike conduct during game with the New York Rangers on November 2, 2017, at Amalie Arena.	—	$5,000	November 3, 2017
Alex Killorn	Fined $5,000 for unsportsmanlike conduct during game with the New York Rangers on November 2, 2017, at Amalie Arena.	—	$5,000	November 3, 2017
Cedric Paquette	Suspended one game for boarding Boston Bruins' defenseman Torey Krug on November 29, 2017, at TD Garden.	1 game	$4,368	November 30, 2017
Steven Stamkos	Fined $5,000 for a dangerous trip on Toronto Maple Leafs' defenseman Morgan Rielly on March 20, 2018, at Amalie Arena.	—	$5,000	March 21, 2018

== Awards and honours ==
=== Awards ===
Regular season
Player	Award	Awarded
Steven Stamkos	NHL First Star of the Week	October 23, 2017
Nikita Kucherov	NHL Second Star of the Week	October 23, 2017
Steven Stamkos	NHL First Star of October	November 1, 2017
Nikita Kucherov	NHL Second Star of October	November 1, 2017
Nikita Kucherov	NHL Second Star of the Week	November 13, 2017
Nikita Kucherov	NHL Third Star of December	January 2, 2018
Steven Stamkos	NHL All-Star game selection	January 3, 2018
Jon Cooper	NHL All-Star game selection	January 7, 2018
Nikita Kucherov	NHL All-Star game selection	January 10, 2018
Victor Hedman	NHL All-Star game selection	January 10, 2018
Andrei Vasilevskiy	NHL All-Star game selection	January 10, 2018
Brayden Point	NHL All-Star game selection	January 24, 2018
Yanni Gourde	NHL Rookie of the Month for February	March 1, 2018
Victor Hedman	James Norris Memorial Trophy	June 20, 2018

=== Milestones ===
Regular season
Player	Milestone	Reached
Mikhail Sergachev	1st career NHL assist 1st career NHL point	October 6, 2017
Slater Koekkoek	1st career NHL goal	October 12, 2017
Mikhail Sergachev	1st career NHL goal	October 19, 2017
Steven Stamkos	600th career NHL point	October 21, 2017
Andrei Vasilevskiy	100th career NHL game	October 26, 2017
Dan Girardi	800th career NHL game	October 28, 2017
Steven Stamkos	600th career NHL game	November 2, 2017
Nikita Kucherov	300th career NHL game	November 4, 2017
Chris Kunitz	900th career NHL game	November 8, 2017
Jake Dotchin	1st career NHL goal	November 8, 2017
Vladislav Namestnikov	100th career NHL point	November 22, 2017
Braydon Coburn	800th career NHL game	November 24, 2017
Brayden Point	100th career NHL game	December 16, 2017
Cedric Paquette	200th career NHL game	December 23, 2017
Tyler Johnson	100th career NHL goal	December 31, 2017
Alex Killorn	400th career NHL game	January 22, 2018
Andrej Sustr	300th career NHL game	January 25, 2018
Steven Stamkos	300th career NHL assist	January 25, 2018
Alex Killorn	200th career NHL point	February 1, 2018
Nikita Kucherov	300th career NHL point	February 3, 2018
Victor Hedman	600th career NHL game	February 12, 2018
Braydon Coburn	200th career NHL point	February 12, 2018
Chris Kunitz	600th career NHL point	February 22, 2018
Anthony Cirelli	1st career NHL game 1st career NHL goal 1st career NHL assist 1st career NHL point	March 1, 2018
Ryan Callahan	700 career NHL game	March 18, 2018
Adam Erne	1st career NHL assist	March 20, 2018
Brayden Point	100th career NHL point	March 22, 2018
Yanni Gourde	100th career NHL game	March 30, 2018
Anton Stralman	700th career NHL game	April 3, 2018

Playoffs
Player	Milestone	Reached
Yanni Gourde	1st career playoff game 1st career playoff assist 1st career playoff goal 1st career playoff point	April 12, 2018
Brayden Point	1st career playoff game 1st career playoff assist 1st career playoff point	April 12, 2018
Mikhail Sergachev	1st career playoff game 1st career playoff assist 1st career playoff point	April 12, 2018
Anthony Cirelli	1st career playoff game	April 12, 2018
Brayden Point	1st career playoff goal	April 14, 2018
Ryan McDonagh	100th career playoff game	April 18, 2018
Mikhail Sergachev	1st career playoff goal	April 21, 2018
Anthony Cirelli	1st career playoff assist 1st career playoff point	April 21, 2018
Anthony Cirelli	1st career playoff goal	May 2, 2018
Anton Stralman	100th career playoff game	May 17, 2018

== Transactions ==
The Lightning have been involved in the following transactions during the 2017–18 season.

=== Trades ===
Date	Details		Ref
June 21, 2017	To Vegas Golden Knights Nikita Gusev; 2nd-round pick in 2017; 4th-round pick in 2018	To Tampa Bay Lightning Vegas Golden Knights select Jason Garrison in the 2017 NHL expansion draft
July 1, 2017	To New York Islanders Kristers Gudlevskis	To Tampa Bay Lightning Carter Verhaeghe
November 14, 2017	To Arizona Coyotes Michael Leighton; Tye McGinn	To Tampa Bay Lightning Louis Domingue
January 31, 2018	To Edmonton Oilers Future considerations	To Tampa Bay Lightning Edward Pasquale
February 26, 2018	To New York Rangers Libor Hajek; Brett Howden; Vladislav Namestnikov; 1st-round pick in 2018; Conditional 2nd-round pick in 2019	To Tampa Bay Lightning Ryan McDonagh; J. T. Miller
June 13, 2018	To Los Angeles Kings Peter Budaj	To Tampa Bay Lightning Andy Andreoff

=== Free agents acquired ===
Date	Player	Former team	Contract terms (in U.S. dollars)	Ref
July 1, 2017	Dan Girardi	New York Rangers	2-year, $6 million	
July 1, 2017	Jamie McBain	Arizona Coyotes	1-year, $650,000	
July 1, 2017	Michael Leighton	Carolina Hurricanes	1-year, $650,000	
July 1, 2017	Mat Bodie	Buffalo Sabres	1-year, $650,000	
July 1, 2017	Chris Kunitz	Pittsburgh Penguins	1-year, $2 million	
July 1, 2017	Alex Gallant	San Jose Barracuda	1-year, $675,000	
March 1, 2018	Alex Barré-Boulet	Blainville-Boisbriand Armada	3-year, $2.27 million	

=== Free agents lost ===
Date	Player	New team	Contract terms (in U.S. dollars)	Ref
April 25, 2017	Tanner Richard	Genève-Servette HC	Unknown	
June 19, 2017	Henri Ikonen	Jokerit	Unknown	
June 20, 2017	Joel Vermin	Lausanne HC	Unknown	
July 1, 2017	Luke Witkowski	Detroit Red Wings	2-year, $1.5 million	
July 1, 2017	Matt Taormina	Montreal Canadiens	2-year, $1.3 million	
July 1, 2017	Byron Froese	Montreal Canadiens	2-year, $1.3 million	
July 1, 2017	Greg McKegg	Pittsburgh Penguins	1-year, $650,000	
July 1, 2017	Mike McKenna	Dallas Stars	1-year, $650,000	
September 6, 2017	Mike Halmo	HC Bolzano	Unknown	
September 26, 2017	Cameron Darcy	Kalamazoo Wings	1-year	
October 1, 2017	Stefan Fournier	Brampton Beast	Unknown	
October 14, 2017	Dylan Blujus	Jacksonville Icemen	Unknown	

=== Players released ===
Date	Player	Via	Ref
September 18, 2017	Cameron Darcy	Buyout	
September 18, 2017	Brian Hart	Buyout	

=== Claimed via waivers ===
Player	Previous team	Date	Ref
Chris DiDomenico	Ottawa Senators	November 24, 2017	
Gabriel Dumont	Ottawa Senators	February 21, 2018	

=== Lost via waivers ===
Player	New team	Date	Ref
Gabriel Dumont	Ottawa Senators	November 22, 2017	
Chris DiDomenico	Ottawa Senators	December 1, 2017	
J. T. Brown	Anaheim Ducks	January 14, 2018	

=== Lost via retirement ===
Date	Player	Ref
August 13, 2017	Pierre-Luc Letourneau-Leblond	

=== Player signings ===
Date	Player	Contract terms (in U.S. dollars)	Ref
June 22, 2017	Peter Budaj	2-year, $2.05 million	
June 27, 2017	Andrej Sustr	1-year, $1.95 million	
June 27, 2017	Yanni Gourde	2-year, $1 million	
June 28, 2017	Cory Conacher	2-year, $1.3 million	
June 28, 2017	Gabriel Dumont	2-year, $1.3 million	
June 29, 2017	Alexander Volkov	3-year, $2.775 million	
July 1, 2017	Oleg Sosunov	3-year, $2.775 million	
July 3, 2017	Slater Koekkoek	1-year, $800,000	
July 5, 2017	Matthew Peca	1-year, $650,0000	
July 5, 2017	Jake Dotchin	2-year, $1.62 million	
July 10, 2017	Tyler Johnson	7-year, $35 million	
July 14, 2017	Ondrej Palat	5-year, $26.5 million	
July 18, 2017	Michael Bournival	1-year, $650,000	
August 17, 2017	Tye McGinn	1-year, $650,000	
September 28, 2017	Alexey Lipanov	3-year, $2.775 million	
April 1, 2018	Cal Foote	3-year, $2.775 million	
April 19, 2018	Michael Bournival	1-year, $650,000	
April 19, 2018	Otto Somppi	3-year, $2.4 million	
June 7, 2018	Daniel Walcott	1-year, $650,000	
June 12, 2018	Carter Verhaeghe	1-year, $650,000	
June 18, 2018	Edward Pasquale	1-year, $650,000	

== Draft picks ==
Below are the Tampa Bay Lightning' selections at the 2017 NHL entry draft, which was held on June 23 and 24, 2017, at the United Center in Chicago, Illinois.

Round	#	Player	Pos	Nationality	College/Junior/Club team (League)
1	14	Callan Foote	D	Canada	Kelowna Rockets (WHL)
2	48^{1}	Alexander Volkov	RW	Russia	SKA-1946 St. Petersburg (MHL)
3	76	Alexey Lipanov	C	Russia	Dynamo Balashikha (VHL)
6	169	Nicklaus Perbix	D	United States	Elk River High School (MSHSL)
6	180	Cole Guttman	C	United States	Dubuque Fighting Saints (USHL)
7	200	Sam Walker	C	United States	Edina High School (MSHSL)

Draft notes:

1. The Toronto Maple Leafs' second-round pick went to the Tampa Bay Lightning as the result of a trade on February 27, 2017, that sent Brian Boyle to Toronto in exchange for Byron Froese and this pick (being conditional at the time of the trade).
