= Peter Budaj =

Slovak ice hockey player (born 1982)

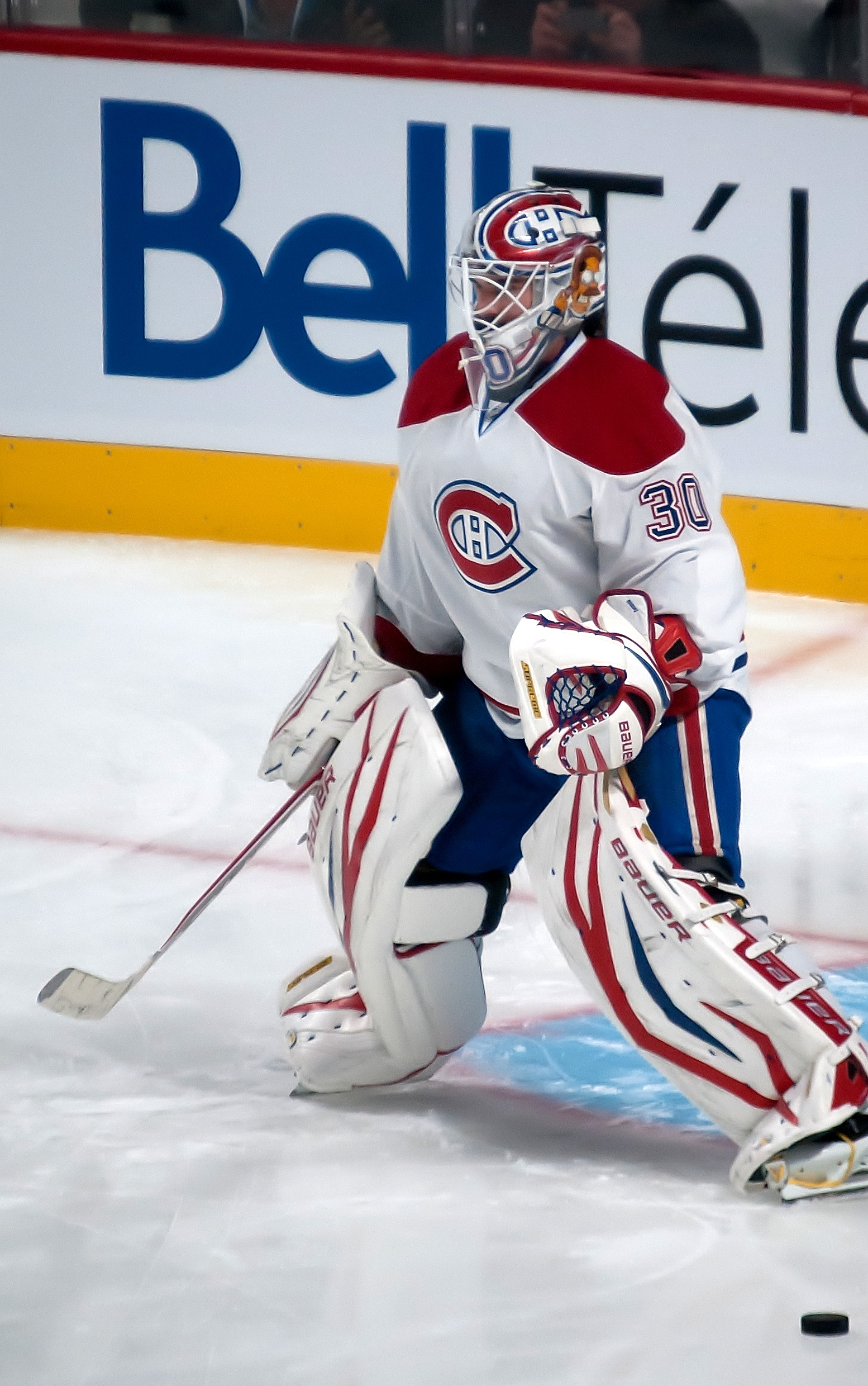
- Budaj with the Montreal Canadiens in 2013
- Born: 18 September 1982 (age 44) Banská Bystrica, Czechoslovakia
- Height: 6 ft 1 in (185 cm)
- Weight: 196 lb (89 kg; 14 st 0 lb)
- Position: Goaltender
- Caught: Left
- Played for: Colorado Avalanche; Montreal Canadiens; Los Angeles Kings; Tampa Bay Lightning
- National team: Slovakia
- NHL draft: 63rd overall, 2001; Colorado Avalanche
- Playing career: 2002–2019

Peter Budaj (/buːˈdaɪ/ boo-DYE; born 18 September 1982) is a Slovak former professional ice hockey goaltender. He played in the National Hockey League (NHL) for the Colorado Avalanche, which drafted him, Montreal Canadiens, Los Angeles Kings, and Tampa Bay Lightning.

== Playing career ==
=== Colorado Avalanche ===
Budaj was drafted by the Colorado Avalanche in the 2001 draft as the first pick for the Avalanche and 63rd overall. He wore number 31 for the Avalanche after playing for the Hershey Bears of the American Hockey League (AHL) and the Toronto St. Michael's Majors of the Ontario Hockey League (OHL).

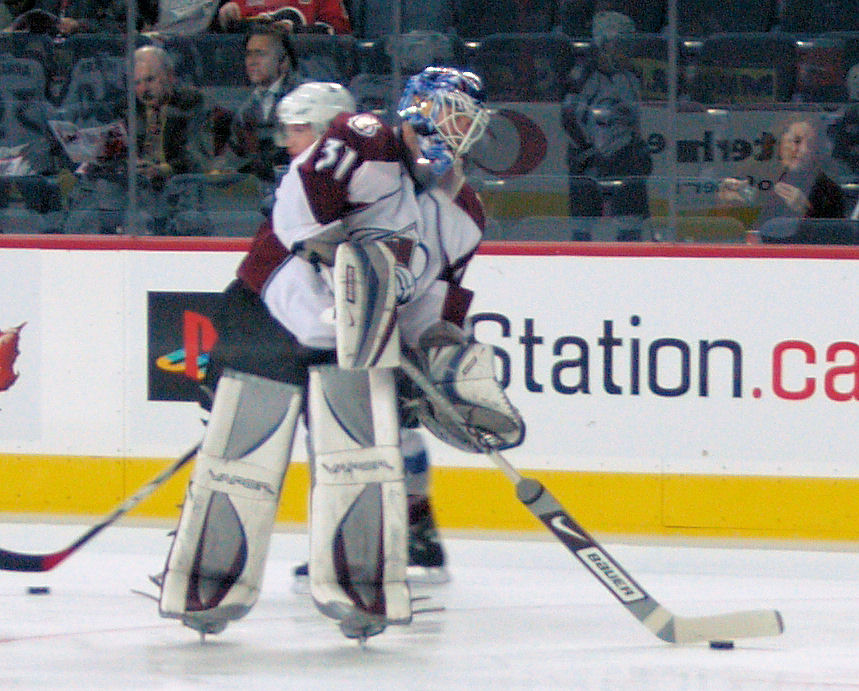
Budaj with the Avalanche in 2007.

In his first NHL season in 2005–06, he appeared in 34 games while backing up David Aebischer and then José Théodore. He recorded a combined 47 wins in the next two seasons while splitting duties with Théodore. His first NHL playoff appearances came in the 2008 Stanley Cup Playoffs in relief of Théodore in Colorado's second round matchup against the eventual Stanley Cup champions Detroit Red Wings.

Budaj played his 100th NHL game on 3 November 2007, in a 4–3 home loss against the Vancouver Canucks.

For the 2008–09 season, Budaj was named the starting goalie for the Colorado Avalanche for the first time. He and backup goaltender Andrew Raycroft struggled throughout the season as the Avalanche finished last in the Western Conference, missing the playoffs for the second time in last three seasons.

On 29 June 2009, Budaj was re-signed by the Avalanche to a one-year contract for the 2009–10 season. He started the season playing as the Avalanche backup goalie to Craig Anderson, formerly of the Florida Panthers. Before his first appearance in net, Budaj was diagnosed with the H1N1 virus and was completely isolated from the rest of the team until he was cleared to play by the coaching staff. Budaj finally made his first appearance of the season on 4 November, against the Phoenix Coyotes. He stopped 28 of 29 shots and backstopped the Avs to a 4–1 victory. Budaj made his second post season appearance on 22 April 2010 against the San Jose Sharks, when he relieved Craig Anderson at 11:05 in the third period. The Sharks won the game 5–0, with one goal scored against Budaj.

On 1 April 2011, Budaj became the first Slovak goaltender to reach 100 career NHL wins with a 4–3 shootout win over Phoenix.

=== Montreal Canadiens ===
Budaj signed as a free agent to a two-year contract worth $2.3 million with the Montreal Canadiens on 1 July 2011. During the lockout shortened 2012–13 season, his second year as backup to Carey Price, Budaj carried an 8–1–1 record in 13 games, to earn a two-year contract extension with the Canadiens on 10 April 2013.

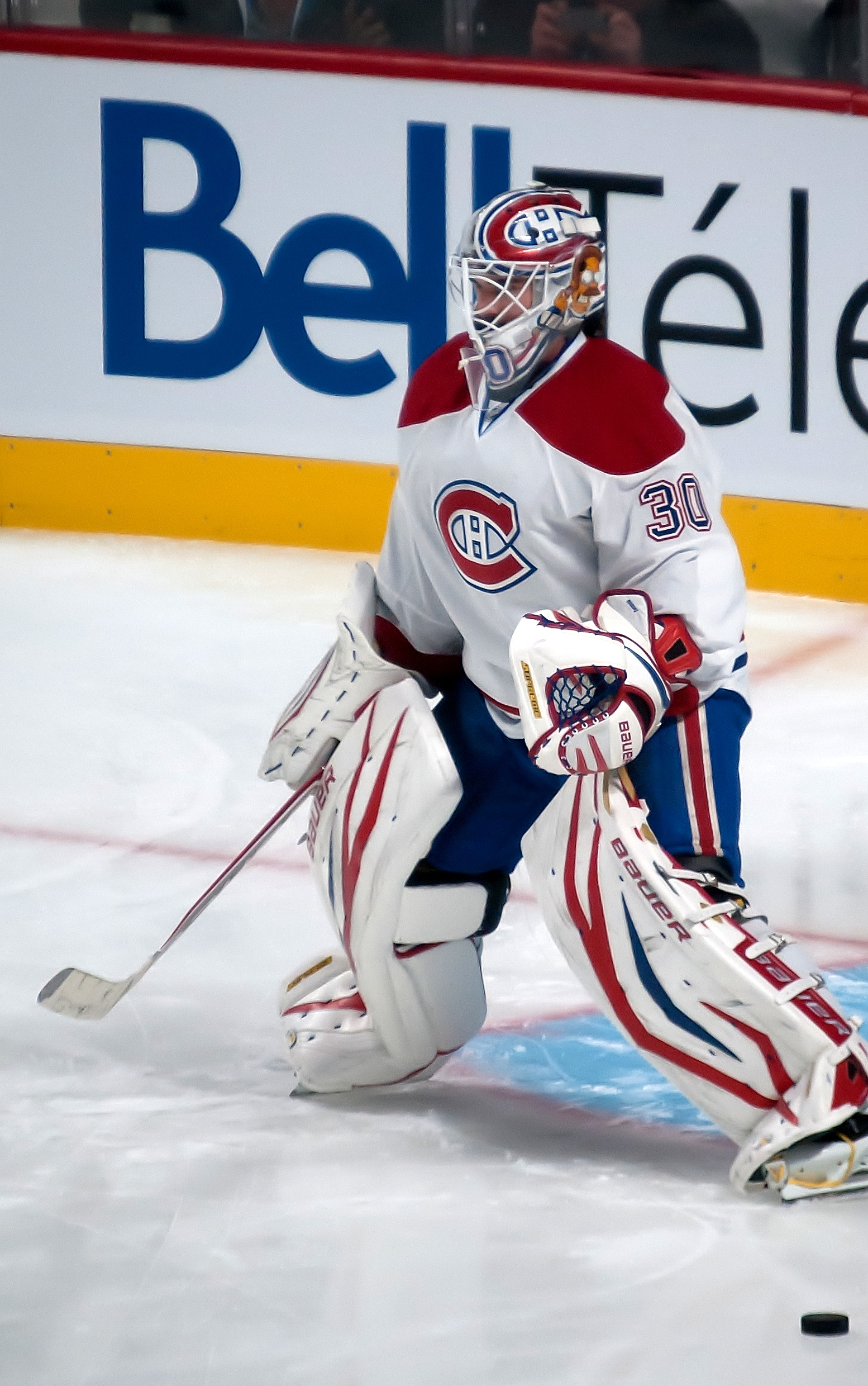
Budaj with the Montreal Canadiens

=== Winnipeg Jets ===
On 5 October 2014, Budaj and Patrick Holland were traded to the Winnipeg Jets in return for Eric Tangradi. He was waived less than a day later. On the following day, he was assigned to the St. John's IceCaps, Winnipeg's American Hockey League affiliate, after clearing waivers. Budaj remained with the IceCaps for the duration of the 2014–15 season, however was unable to impress with the club in failing to win a single game in 19 contests.

=== Los Angeles Kings ===
As a free agent from the Jets, Budaj was unable to secure an NHL contract and on 28 August 2015, agreed to sign a try-out contract to attend the Los Angeles Kings training camp. On 9 October 2015 it was announced that Budaj signed a one-year, two-way contract with the Los Angeles Kings and was subsequently waived and assigned to the Ontario Reign of the AHL to begin the 2015–16 season. Budaj immediately rebounded with the Reign with a succession of impressive performances to secure the starting goaltender duties. In leading the Reign to claim the Pacific Division title, Budaj led the league in most statistical categories to earn the Baz Bastien Memorial Award as the AHL's best goaltender. On 11 February 2016, he was recalled by the Los Angeles Kings on an emergency basis and made a victorious debut in a victory over the New York Rangers. On his return to Ontario, Budaj was signed to a one-year contract extension to remain with the Kings on 2 March 2016.

In the 2016–17 season, Budaj was again recalled by the Kings in October 2016, after starting goaltender Jonathan Quick was injured in the opening game of the year. In beating out current backup Jeff Zatkoff, Budaj assumed starting duties for the Kings to cover for the loss of Quick. In gaining an NHL starting role for the first time since 2011 with the Avalanche, Budaj responded in recording his best statistical year in the league. Having posted 27 wins and a career best 7 shutouts in 53 games, Budaj was returned to the backup role upon Quick's return on 25 February 2017.

=== Tampa Bay Lightning ===
On 26 February 2017, the Kings traded Budaj, alongside Erik Černák and a 2017 7th-round pick to the Tampa Bay Lightning in exchange for goaltender Ben Bishop and a 2017 5th-round pick. Budaj finished the campaign with a 3–1–0 record in seven games with the Lightning. On 22 June 2017, Budaj signed a two-year, $2.05 million contract extension with the Lightning.

Budaj appeared in eight games with the Lightning during the 2017–18 season, having a record of 3–3–1. Budaj also spent time with the Syracuse Crunch on a conditioning stint.

=== Return to Los Angeles ===
On 13 June 2018, Budaj was traded back to the Kings in exchange for forward Andy Andreoff. While Budaj was originally assigned to the Kings AHL affiliate, after starting goaltender Jonathan Quick was placed on Injured Reserve on 7 October he was recalled to the NHL. Budaj was reassigned to the AHL on 18 October. Budaj played out the remainder of the season with the Reign, ending his 17 year professional career at the conclusion of the regular season.

== Mask ==
Budaj, a devout Christian, is perhaps best known for having the depiction of Ned Flanders, a popular religious character from the animated television series The Simpsons painted on his masks. In 2008, Budaj began wearing a mask featuring the character Altaïr from the first Assassin's Creed video game. The mask primarily worn by Budaj during the 2008–09 season features a burgundy colored version of the Marvel Comics superhero, the Hulk, although he did continue wearing the Assassin's Creed mask as well. Budaj's 2009–10 mask features his racing idol Valentino Rossi on one side, the Avalanche's alternate foot logo on the other, and retains Ned Flanders on the back. Budaj's 2013–14 mask still has Ned Flanders' image as well as an image of Argentine soccer star Lionel Messi. Ned Flanders continues to appear on Budaj's 2014–15 mask, without Lionel Messi. Then, during his lone season with the Lightning, his Ned Flanders character was depicted as transformed into another Marvel superhero, Thor, whose powers, derived from the namesake Norse deity, go along with the team's theme of lightning.

== Personal life ==
Peter and his wife Taylor have two sons together.

During his career, Budaj repeatedly expressed his Christian beliefs and comes from Catholic education and upbringing. He was active in Hockey Ministeries International.

After retiring from playing hockey Budaj moved to Bozeman, Montana to be closer to his wife's family. He started a goalie training company called Budaj Blockers and also served as assistant coach of the Montana State University Bobcats hockey team.

In 2021 Budaj became a goalie development coach with the Avalanche organization. He joined the Anaheim Ducks as a goalie coach in 2024.

== Career statistics ==
=== Regular season and playoffs ===
			Regular season										Playoffs
Season	Team	League	GP	W	L	T	OTL	MIN	GA	SO	GAA	SV%	GP	W	L	MIN	GA	SO	GAA	SV%
1999–00	Toronto St. Michael's Majors	OHL	34	6	18	1	—	1676	112	1	4.01	.882	—	—	—	—	—	—	—	—
2000–01	Toronto St. Michael's Majors	OHL	37	17	12	3	—	1996	95	3	2.86	.907	11	6	4	621	26	1	2.51	—
2001–02	Toronto St. Michael's Majors	OHL	42	26	9	5	—	1148	89	2	2.29	.922	12	5	6	620	34	1	3.29	.898
2002–03	Hershey Bears	AHL	28	10	10	2	—	1467	65	2	2.66	.911	1	0	0	6	2	0	20.81	.333
2003–04	Hershey Bears	AHL	46	17	20	6	—	2574	120	3	2.80	.916	—	—	—	—	—	—	—	—
2004–05	Hershey Bears	AHL	59	29	25	2	—	3356	148	5	2.65	.919	—	—	—	—	—	—	—	—
2005–06	Colorado Avalanche	NHL	34	14	10	—	6	1802	86	2	2.86	.900	—	—	—	—	—	—	—	—
2006–07	Colorado Avalanche	NHL	57	31	16	—	6	3198	143	3	2.68	.905	—	—	—	—	—	—	—	—
2007–08	Colorado Avalanche	NHL	35	16	10	—	4	1912	82	0	2.57	.903	3	0	0	107	6	0	3.33	.908
2008–09	Colorado Avalanche	NHL	56	20	29	—	5	3232	154	2	2.86	.899	—	—	—	—	—	—	—	—
2009–10	Colorado Avalanche	NHL	15	5	5	—	2	728	32	1	2.64	.917	1	0	0	9	1	0	6.67	.750
2010–11	Colorado Avalanche	NHL	45	15	21	—	4	2439	130	1	3.20	.895	—	—	—	—	—	—	—	—
2011–12	Montreal Canadiens	NHL	17	5	7	—	5	1037	44	0	2.55	.913	—	—	—	—	—	—	—	—
2012–13	Montreal Canadiens	NHL	13	8	1	—	1	656	25	1	2.29	.908	2	0	2	63	7	0	6.67	.774
2013–14	Montreal Canadiens	NHL	24	10	8	—	3	1338	56	1	2.51	.909	1	0	0	20	3	0	9.00	.625
2014–15	St. John's IceCaps	AHL	19	0	9	—	6	913	54	0	3.55	.888	—	—	—	—	—	—	—	—
2015–16	Ontario Reign	AHL	60	42	14	—	5	3575	104	9	1.75	.932	13	7	6	800	29	0	2.18	.904
2015–16	Los Angeles Kings	NHL	1	1	0	—	0	62	4	0	3.87	.857	—	—	—	—	—	—	—	—
2016–17	Los Angeles Kings	NHL	53	27	20	—	3	3042	107	7	2.12	.917	—	—	—	—	—	—	—	—
2016–17	Tampa Bay Lightning	NHL	7	3	1	—	0	280	13	0	2.80	.898	—	—	—	—	—	—	—	—
2017–18	Tampa Bay Lightning	NHL	8	3	3	—	1	431	27	0	3.77	.876	—	—	—	—	—	—	—	—
2017–18	Syracuse Crunch	AHL	2	0	1	—	1	122	6	0	2.95	.887	—	—	—	—	—	—	—	—
2018–19	Ontario Reign	AHL	27	7	11	—	7	1513	94	1	3.73	.890	—	—	—	—	—	—	—	—
2018–19	Los Angeles Kings	NHL	3	0	1	—	0	72	6	0	5.00	.818	—	—	—	—	—	—	—	—
NHL totals			368	158	132	—	40	20,216	909	18	2.70	.904	7	0	2	199	17	0	5.13	.843

=== International ===
Year	Team	Event	Result	GP	W	L	T	MIN	GA	SO	GAA	SV%
2000	Slovakia	WJC18	5th	5	2	3	0	249	13	0	3.13	.932
2001	Slovakia	WJC	8th	4	1	3	0	239	16	0	4.01	.875
2002	Slovakia	WJC	8th	4	1	0	2	212	11	1	3.11	.919
2006	Slovakia	OG	5th	3	2	1	0	179	6	0	2.01	.924
2008	Slovakia	WC	13th	1	0	1	0	59	3	0	3.03	.903
2010	Slovakia	WC	12th	6	2	4	0	282	13	0	2.76	.913
2014	Slovakia	OG	11th	1	0	0	0	27	2	0	4.44	.750
Senior totals				11	4	6	0	547	24	0	2.67	—

== Awards and honours ==
Award	Year
OHL
Second All-Star Team	2002
AHL
All-Star Game	2016
First All-Star Team	2016
Baz Bastien Memorial Award	2016
Harry "Hap" Holmes Memorial Award	2016
NHL
YoungStars Game	2007

Awards and achievements
Preceded by Matt Murray	Aldege "Baz" Bastien Memorial Award; 2015–16	Succeeded by Troy Grosenick
