= Louis Domingue =

Canadian ice hockey player (born 1992)

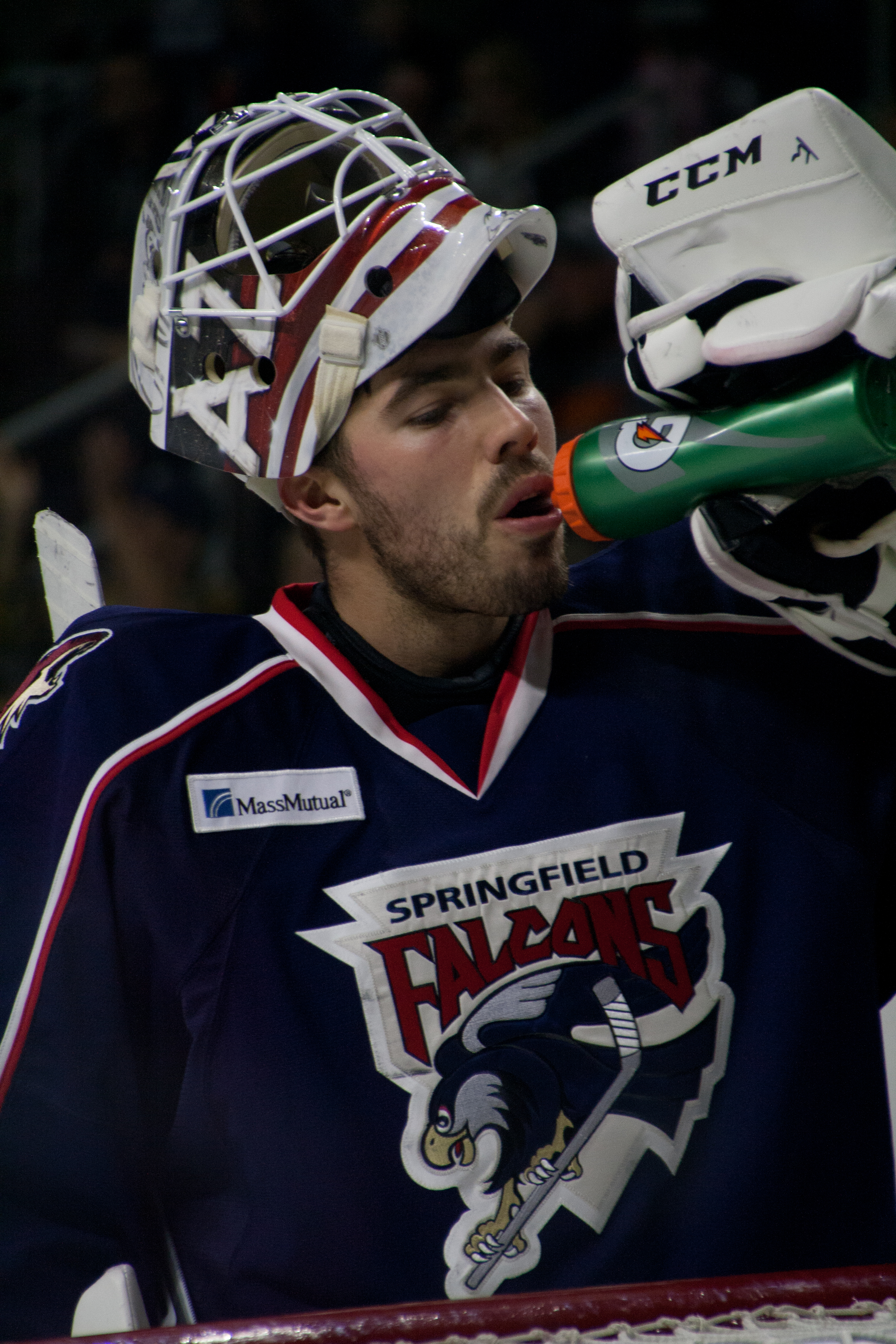
- Domingue with the Springfield Falcons in 2015
- Born: March 6, 1992 (age 34) Mont-Saint-Hilaire, Quebec, Canada
- Height: 6 ft 3 in (191 cm)
- Weight: 210 lb (95 kg; 15 st 0 lb)
- Position: Goaltender
- Catches: Right
- ICEHL team Former teams: HC Bolzano; Arizona Coyotes; Tampa Bay Lightning; New Jersey Devils; Vancouver Canucks; Calgary Flames; Pittsburgh Penguins; New York Rangers; Sibir Novosibirsk
- NHL draft: 138th overall, 2010; Phoenix Coyotes
- Playing career: 2012–present

Louis Boileau-Domingue (born March 6, 1992) is a Canadian professional ice hockey goaltender for the Hockey Club Bolzano of the ICE Hockey League.

Domingue was selected by the Phoenix Coyotes in the fifth round, 138th overall, of the 2010 NHL entry draft, with whom he spent the first portion of his career. He has also played in the NHL for the Tampa Bay Lightning, Vancouver Canucks, New Jersey Devils, Calgary Flames, Pittsburgh Penguins, and New York Rangers, as well as in the Kontinental Hockey League (KHL) with Sibir Novosibirsk.

== Playing career ==
=== Early career ===
Domingue was drafted 13th overall by the Moncton Wildcats in the 2008 Quebec Major Junior Hockey League (QMJHL) entry draft, and he played major junior hockey in the QMJHL with both the Wildcats and the Quebec Remparts. In 2010 he was selected to play in the CHL/NHL Top Prospects Game. Domingue was subsequently drafted by the NHL's Phoenix Coyotes and, on June 1, 2011, he was signed by the team to a three-year, entry-level contract.

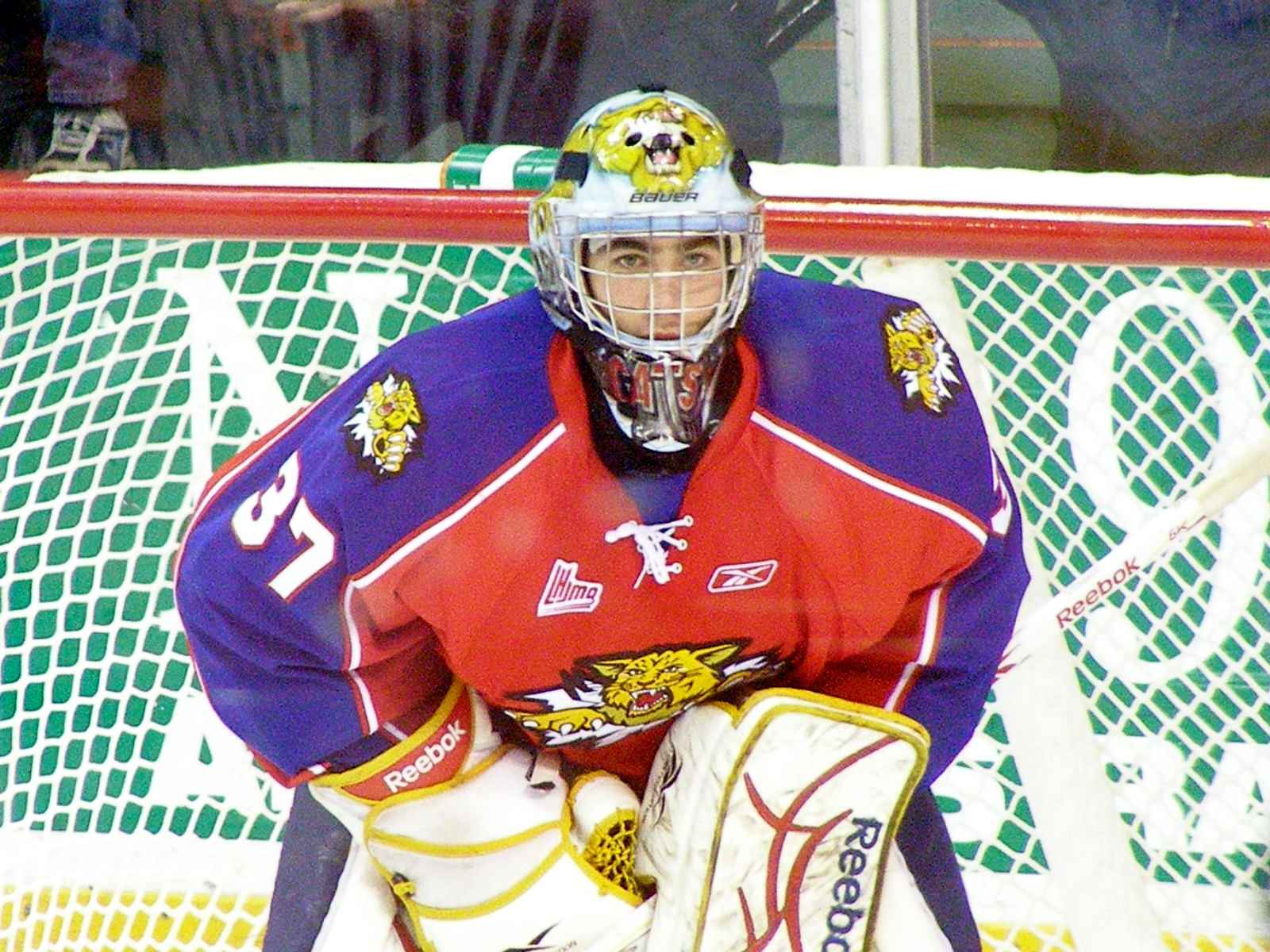
Domingue with the Moncton Wildcats in 2009.

Domingue was assigned to play the 2011–12 season with the Remparts, where he led all QMJHL goaltenders with a .914 save percentage before making his professional debut the following year, playing the 2012–13 season with both the Portland Pirates of the American Hockey League (AHL) and the Gwinnett Gladiators of the ECHL.

=== Phoenix/Arizona Coyotes ===
In the 2014–15 season, after Arizona traded its backup goaltender Devan Dubnyk to the Minnesota Wild, Domingue was called up to the NHL for the first time, to back-up starter Mike Smith. Domingue made his NHL debut appearing in relief and allowing two goals in a 7–2 defeat to the Ottawa Senators on January 31, 2015. The following day, Domingue received his first NHL start, and recorded his first win, in a 3–2 victory over the then-Eastern Conference-leading Montreal Canadiens. He finished the season as Smith's full-time backup.

In the 2015–16 season, Domingue was again recalled, following an injury to Mike Smith. Originally intended to back-up Anders Lindbäck during Smith's injury, Domingue's strong play moved him ahead of Lindbäck and into the temporary starting role. On June 27, 2016, Domingue signed a two-year contract extension with Arizona.

=== Tampa Bay Lightning ===
Domingue began the 2017–18 season as Arizona's backup goaltender. Following an injury to newly acquired starter Antti Raanta, Domingue was unable to hold the fort, going winless in seven games. On October 31, 2017, Domingue was assigned to the Coyotes' AHL affiliate, the Tucson Roadrunners, after clearing waivers. Before appearing with the Roadrunners, on November 14, 2017, the Coyotes traded Domingue to the Tampa Bay Lightning in exchange for goaltender Michael Leighton and forward Tye McGinn.

On June 22, 2018, the Lightning signed Domingue to a two-year, $2.3 million contract extension. On December 10, 2018, Domingue was named the NHL's second star of the week. On February 2, 2019, Domingue helped the Lightning record a 3–2 win over the New York Rangers at Madison Square Garden. The win was Domingue's ninth straight win. The win tied him with John Grahame (2005–06) and Andrei Vasilevskiy (2017–18) for the longest win streak by a Lightning goaltender. On February 10, 2019, Domingue set the franchise record with his tenth straight win, which came in a 5–2 Lightning victory over the Florida Panthers at BB&T Center. On February 19, 2019, Domingue extended his win streak to 11-games in a 5–2 win over the Philadelphia Flyers at Wells Fargo Center. Domingue's streak came to an end against the Boston Bruins on February 28, 2019.

On September 20, 2019, Domingue was placed on waivers by the Lightning. He cleared the following day, and was assigned to the Syracuse Crunch to begin the 2019–20 season. In four games with the Crunch, Domingue posted a 2–1–1 record.

=== New Jersey Devils and Vancouver Canucks ===
On November 1, 2019, Domingue was traded to the New Jersey Devils in exchange for a conditional seventh round draft pick in the 2021 NHL entry draft. He initially joined AHL affiliate, the Binghamton Devils, before he was recalled by the Devils to serve as backup to Mackenzie Blackwood. Domingue struggled to assert himself as the Devils backup, collecting just three wins in 16 appearances, before he was placed on waivers and reassigned to the AHL with Binghamton.

On February 24, 2020, Domingue was traded to the Vancouver Canucks in exchange for Zane McIntyre. He immediately joined the club due to an injury to Jacob Markström. He made a lone appearance with the Canucks in a 5–3 defeat to the Columbus Blue Jackets on March 1, 2020, and remained with the club after the COVID-19 pandemic pause, as the Canucks' third-string goaltender in the return-to-play postseason.

=== Calgary Flames ===
As a free agent, Domingue joined the Calgary Flames, on a one-year, two-way contract on October 11, 2020. In the shortened 2020–21 season, Domingue was primarily used in a depth role, assigned to the Flames extended taxi squad. He made three appearances with AHL affiliate, the Stockton Heat, before making his lone appearance with the Flames, allowing three goals in a 4–2 defeat against his former club, the Vancouver Canucks, on May 18, 2021.

=== Pittsburgh Penguins ===
As a free agent in the following off-season, Domingue signed a one-year, two-way contract with the Pittsburgh Penguins on September 2, 2021. Domingue spent most of the regular season in the AHL with Pittsburgh's AHL affiliate, the Wilkes-Barre/Scranton Penguins, recording a 10–9–4 record and a .924 save percentage. He appeared in two games with Pittsburgh, going 1–1–0 with a .952 save percentage. After Pittsburgh's starting goaltender Tristan Jarry injured his foot weeks before the 2022 Stanley Cup playoffs, Domingue was called up to serve as temporary backup goaltender to Casey DeSmith.

Domingue was unexpectedly called into service in Game 1 of the first round matchup against the New York Rangers after DeSmith exited midway through the second overtime period with a lower body injury, and stopped all 17 shots he faced before Evgeni Malkin won the game for Pittsburgh in triple overtime. Domingue noted that he had not expected to play and had eaten "quite the meal" of spicy pork and broccoli between the first and second overtime periods. "Spicy pork and broccoli" soon became a meme among Pittsburgh fans, and the team itself. DeSmith was subsequently ruled out for the remainder of the playoffs, leaving Domingue as the team's starting goaltender. He then recorded his first victorious postseason start in Game 3 on May 7 to give the Penguins a 2–1 series lead. The series attracted media attention for Domingue's success versus the Rangers' starting goaltender Igor Shesterkin, the favourite for the Vezina Trophy, who was pulled from the net in both games 3 and 4. The series turned against the Penguins in game 5 when captain Sidney Crosby was forced to exit midway through, and he allowed a bad goal late in Game 6. Pittsburgh lost games 5 and 6. Jarry returned to the net for game 7, but the Penguins were eliminated.

=== New York Rangers ===
As a free agent from the Penguins, Domingue joined his seventh club in agreeing to a two-year, $1.55 million contract with the New York Rangers on July 13, 2022. On October 2, he was assigned to the Hartford Wolf Pack of the AHL. Following injuries to Rangers starter Igor Shesterkin and backup Jonathan Quick, Domingue played in his first NHL game in 18 months, making 25 saves in a 4–1 win against the Minnesota Wild on November 9, 2023. On March 10, 2024, Domingue signed a one-year contract extension with the Rangers. While playing for Hartford on April 12, 2024, Domingue scored an empty-net goal against the Springfield Thunderbirds. This was Domingue's first career professional goal and the second goal by a goalie in Wolf Pack franchise history (Jean-François Labbé was the first franchise goalie to score a goal in 2000). Due to an injury to Shesterkin, he was called up to the Rangers to start a game against the Chicago Blackhawks on January 5, 2025, winning the game 6-2.

=== KHL ===
On July 17, 2025, having left the Rangers as a free agent, Domingue left North America after 13 professional seasons and was signed to a one-year contract with Russian club, Sibir Novosibirsk of the Kontinental Hockey League (KHL). However, just three and a half months later, Domingue was released by Novosibirsk for family reasons on November 3.

=== Florida Panthers ===
On November 24, 2025, after his departure from the KHL, Domingue signed a one-year contract with the AHL's Charlotte Checkers for the remainder of the 2025–26 season. After seven appearances with the Checkers, Domingue was signed to a one-year, two-way contract for the remainder of the season with the Checkers' NHL affiliate, the Florida Panthers, on March 4, 2026.

=== HC Bolzano ===
While unrestricted free agent, on July 31, 2026 Domingue signed a one-year contract with the ICE Hockey League's Italian team Hockey Club Bolzano.

== Career statistics ==
=== Regular season and playoffs ===
			Regular season									Playoffs
Season	Team	League	GP	W	L	OTL	MIN	GA	SO	GAA	SV%	GP	W	L	MIN	GA	SO	GAA	SV%
2007–08	Lac Saint-Louis Lions	QMAAA	35	22	9	0	1,732	90	2	3.12	—	13	8	2	761	33	1	2.60	—
2008–09	Moncton Wildcats	QMJHL	12	5	3	2	621	24	0	2.32	.930	—	—	—	—	—	—	—	—
2009–10	Moncton Wildcats	QMJHL	22	11	9	0	1,195	56	1	2.81	.902	—	—	—	—	—	—	—	—
2009–10	Quebec Remparts	QMJHL	19	9	8	0	1,017	43	2	2.54	.910	9	3	5	455	33	0	4.35	.863
2010–11	Quebec Remparts	QMJHL	57	37	12	3	3,033	134	2	2.65	.898	18	11	6	996	41	1	2.47	.913
2011–12	Quebec Remparts	QMJHL	39	23	8	4	2,162	94	4	2.61	.914	11	7	4	679	30	0	2.65	.897
2012–13	Gwinnett Gladiators	ECHL	34	23	9	2	2,051	92	3	2.69	.904	10	6	4	619	23	2	2.23	.926
2012–13	Portland Pirates	AHL	2	1	0	0	100	4	0	2.40	.931	—	—	—	—	—	—	—	—
2013–14	Gwinnett Gladiators	ECHL	7	1	3	2	388	13	1	2.01	.939	—	—	—	—	—	—	—	—
2013–14	Portland Pirates	AHL	36	9	18	2	1,783	108	1	3.63	.890	—	—	—	—	—	—	—	—
2014–15	Gwinnett Gladiators	ECHL	2	1	1	0	119	2	1	1.01	.958	—	—	—	—	—	—	—	—
2014–15	Arizona Coyotes	NHL	7	1	2	1	308	14	0	2.73	.911	—	—	—	—	—	—	—	—
2015–16	Springfield Falcons	AHL	13	6	6	1	778	33	1	2.55	.919	—	—	—	—	—	—	—	—
2015–16	Arizona Coyotes	NHL	39	15	18	4	2,188	101	2	2.75	.912	—	—	—	—	—	—	—	—
2016–17	Arizona Coyotes	NHL	31	11	15	1	1,599	82	0	3.08	.908	—	—	—	—	—	—	—	—
2017–18	Arizona Coyotes	NHL	7	0	6	0	388	28	0	4.33	.856	—	—	—	—	—	—	—	—
2017–18	Syracuse Crunch	AHL	18	13	5	0	1,077	39	2	2.17	.919	—	—	—	—	—	—	—	—
2017–18	Tampa Bay Lightning	NHL	12	7	3	1	686	33	0	2.89	.914	1	0	0	19	0	0	0.00	1.000
2018–19	Tampa Bay Lightning	NHL	26	21	5	0	1,561	75	0	2.88	.908	—	—	—	—	—	—	—	—
2019–20	Syracuse Crunch	AHL	4	2	1	1	205	13	0	3.81	.863	—	—	—	—	—	—	—	—
2019–20	Binghamton Devils	AHL	7	4	2	1	417	17	1	2.45	.912	—	—	—	—	—	—	—	—
2019–20	New Jersey Devils	NHL	16	3	8	2	744	47	0	3.79	.882	—	—	—	—	—	—	—	—
2019–20	Vancouver Canucks	NHL	1	0	1	0	59	4	0	4.08	.882	—	—	—	—	—	—	—	—
2020–21	Stockton Heat	AHL	3	0	2	1	178	12	0	4.04	.859	—	—	—	—	—	—	—	—
2020–21	Calgary Flames	NHL	1	0	1	0	58	3	0	3.12	.870	—	—	—	—	—	—	—	—
2021–22	Wilkes-Barre/Scranton Penguins	AHL	22	10	9	4	1,293	52	0	2.41	.924	—	—	—	—	—	—	—	—
2021–22	Pittsburgh Penguins	NHL	2	1	1	0	119	4	0	2.02	.952	6	3	3	313	19	0	3.65	.898
2022–23	Hartford Wolf Pack	AHL	45	22	12	8	2,584	108	4	2.51	.911	1	0	1	55	3	0	3.27	.813
2023–24	Hartford Wolf Pack	AHL	28	16	8	4	1,668	74	1	2.66	.909	—	—	—	—	—	—	—	—
2023–24	New York Rangers	NHL	1	1	0	0	60	1	0	1.00	.962	—	—	—	—	—	—	—	—
2024–25	Hartford Wolf Pack	AHL	28	7	20	1	1,644	91	0	3.32	.896	—	—	—	—	—	—	—	—
2024–25	New York Rangers	NHL	1	1	0	0	60	2	0	2.00	.926	—	—	—	—	—	—	—	—
2025–26	Sibir Novosibirsk	KHL	11	0	9	2	595	38	1	3.83	.892	—	—	—	—	—	—	—	—
2025–26	Charlotte Checkers	AHL	14	9	4	0	788	29	1	2.21	.896	—	—	—	—	—	—	—	—
NHL totals			144	61	60	10	7,846	394	0	3.01	.906	7	3	3	331	19	0	3.45	.902
KHL totals			11	0	9	2	595	38	1	3.83	.892	—	—	—	—	—	—	—	—

== Awards and honours ==
Award	Year	Ref
QMJHL
CHL Top Prospects Game	2010	
Best save percentage	2012	

== Records ==
=== Tampa Bay Lightning ===
- Longest win streak by a Tampa Bay Lightning goaltender, 11 (2018–19)
