= Jake Dotchin =

Canadian ice hockey defenceman

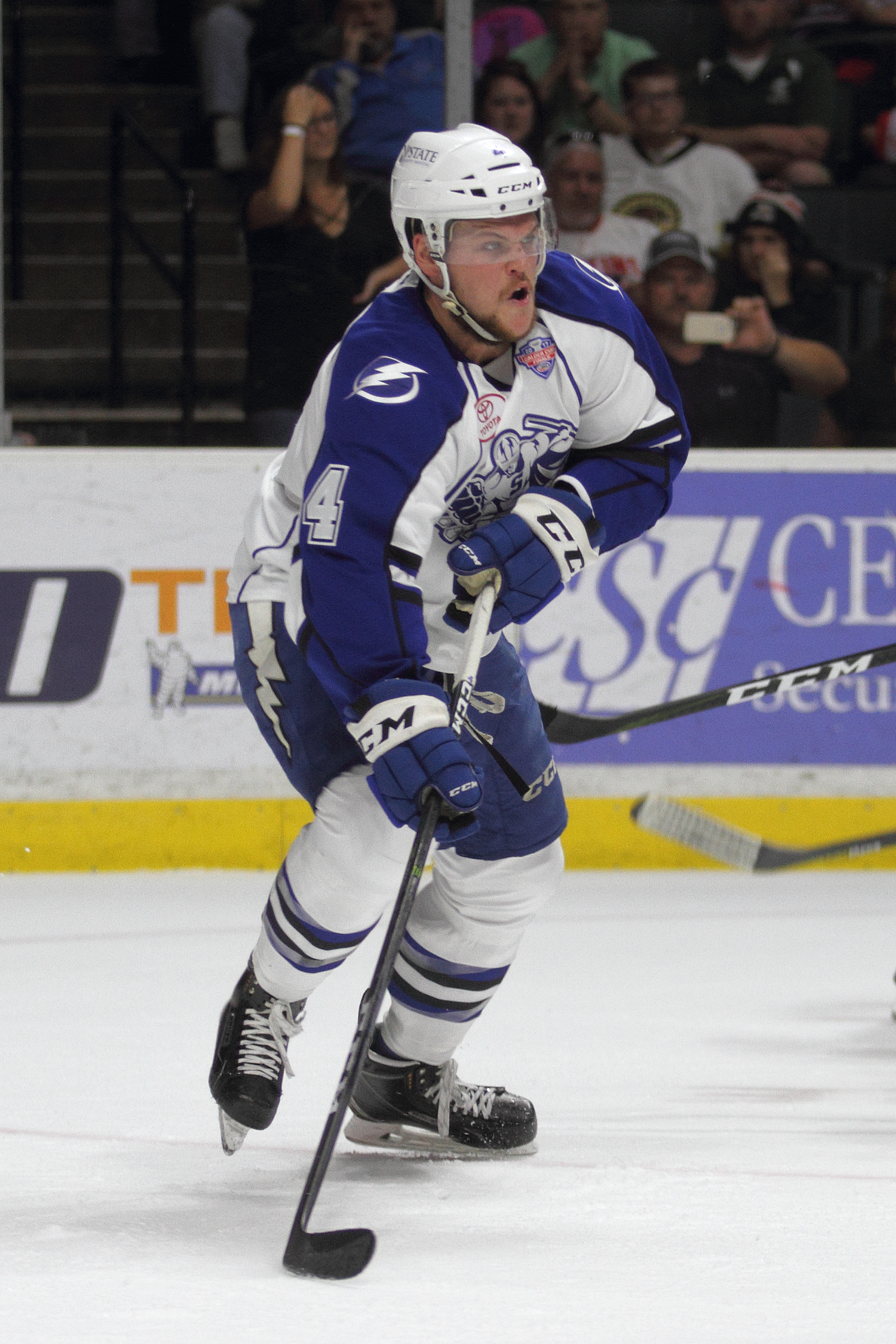
- Dotchin with the Syracuse Crunch in 2017
- Born: March 24, 1994 (age 32) Cambridge, Ontario, Canada
- Height: 6 ft 3 in (191 cm)
- Weight: 210 lb (95 kg; 15 st 0 lb)
- Position: Defence
- Shoots: Right
- ELH team Former teams: Rytíři Kladno; Tampa Bay Lightning; Anaheim Ducks
- NHL draft: 161st overall, 2012; Tampa Bay Lightning
- Playing career: 2014–present

Jake Dotchin (born March 24, 1994) is a Canadian professional ice hockey defenceman who is currently playing with Rytíři Kladno in the Czech Extraliga (ELH). Dotchin was selected by the Tampa Bay Lightning in the sixth round (161st overall) of the 2012 NHL entry draft.

== Early life ==
Dotchin grew up in Glen Morris, to the south of Cambridge, Ontario. He started playing house league hockey in Ayr and moved on to AAA level in Cambridge.

== Playing career ==
=== Junior ===
During three seasons in the OHL with the Owen Sound Attack and the Barrie Colts, Dotchin earned 18 goals and 59 assist for 77 points, along with 279 penalty minutes, in 193 games.

Dotchin was drafted by the Owen Sound Attack in the 4th round, 70th overall, in the 2010 OHL Draft. While with the Attack, Dotchin was drafted 161st overall by the Tampa Bay Lightning in the 2012 NHL entry draft. After playing in 38 games for the Attack during the 2012–13 season, Dotchin was traded to the Barrie Colts in exchange for draft picks.

=== Professional ===
On April 19, 2014, Dotchin signalled the beginning of his professional career in signing a three-year entry-level contract with the Lightning.

On January 17, 2017, the Tampa Bay Lightning recalled Dotchin from the American Hockey League, and he made his NHL debut 4 days later against the Arizona Coyotes at Gila River Arena. On January 31, 2017, Dotchin recorded his first career NHL point and assist at Amalie Arena.

On April 4, 2017, Dotchin was involved in an incident with the Boston Bruins' Brad Marchand. With the two players battling for position in front Lightning goaltender Andrei Vasilevskiy, Dotchin delivered a cross-check to Marchand, who responded by spearing Dotchin in the groin. Dotchin did not return to the game, while Marchand received a 5-minute major penalty for spearing and a game misconduct. Dotchin was not suspended for the cross-check, but Marchand was suspended two games for the spear.

After being returned to the Crunch at the end of the regular season, Dotchin was involved in another incident with Toronto Marlies forward Frédérik Gauthier, where he received a 5-minute major penalty for interference and a game misconduct. He later received a 3-game suspension from the AHL.

On July 5, 2017, Dotchin signed a two-year, one-way contract extension with the Lightning valued at $1.625 million. On November 8, 2017, Dotchin recorded his first career NHL goal, which came in a 5-1 Lightning win over the San Jose Sharks at the SAP Center.

On September 4, 2018, Dotchin was placed on unconditional waivers for contract termination by the Tampa Bay Lightning, who cited a "material breach of contract." Dotchin cleared waivers the next day. According to sports journalist Elliotte Friedman while on a Sportsnet650 radio talk show, Dotchin had reportedly showed up to training camp "with 25% body fat" and "was extremely out of shape". Bob McKenzie, on TSN 1050 Toronto's First Up radio show, stated that Dotchin "was a good 30 to 35 pounds above his playing weight".

On October 17, 2018, Dotchin was signed to a one-year, $800,000 contract by the Anaheim Ducks. After clearing waivers, Dotchin was assigned to continue to improve his conditioning with AHL affiliate, the San Diego Gulls. During the 2018–19 season, Dotchin was later recalled to the Ducks and registered 1 assist in 20 games.

On June 25, 2019, Dotchin was not tendered a qualifying offer by the Ducks, releasing him to free agency. On July 1, 2019, Dotchin agreed to a one-year, two-way contract with the St. Louis Blues.

A free agent from the Blues, Dotchin sat out the pandemic-delayed 2020–21 season, before opting to resume his professional career abroad, signing a one-year contract with Czech club Rytíři Kladno of the ELH on July 14, 2021.

On October 29, 2024 the Alvinston Killer Bees of the semi pro OSHL(Ontario Super Hockey League) announced that Dotchin had signed to play the 2024-25 season with the team.

== Career statistics ==
			Regular season					Playoffs
Season	Team	League	GP	G	A	Pts	PIM	GP	G	A	Pts	PIM
2010–11	Cambridge Winter Hawks	GOJHL	41	5	10	15	88	5	1	3	4	8
2011–12	Owen Sound Attack	OHL	64	3	16	19	77	5	0	3	3	8
2012–13	Owen Sound Attack	OHL	38	2	12	14	39	—	—	—	—	—
2012–13	Barrie Colts	OHL	28	2	6	8	42	17	1	4	5	25
2013–14	Barrie Colts	OHL	63	11	25	36	121	11	3	2	5	13
2014–15	Syracuse Crunch	AHL	55	6	14	20	114	3	0	0	0	0
2015–16	Syracuse Crunch	AHL	67	1	10	11	120	—	—	—	—	—
2016–17	Syracuse Crunch	AHL	35	4	9	13	105	19	0	6	6	43
2016–17	Tampa Bay Lightning	NHL	35	0	11	11	35	—	—	—	—	—
2017–18	Tampa Bay Lightning	NHL	48	3	8	11	38	—	—	—	—	—
2018–19	San Diego Gulls	AHL	20	4	3	7	68	6	0	2	2	8
2018–19	Anaheim Ducks	NHL	20	0	1	1	39	—	—	—	—	—
2019–20	San Antonio Rampage	AHL	37	1	7	8	72	—	—	—	—	—
2021–22	Rytíři Kladno	ELH	50	6	15	21	98	—	—	—	—	—
2022–23	Rytíři Kladno	ELH	49	7	18	25	93	—	—	—	—	—
NHL totals			103	3	20	23	112	—	—	—	—	—
ELH totals			99	13	33	46	191	—	—	—	—	—
