= Tye McGinn =

Canadian ice hockey player

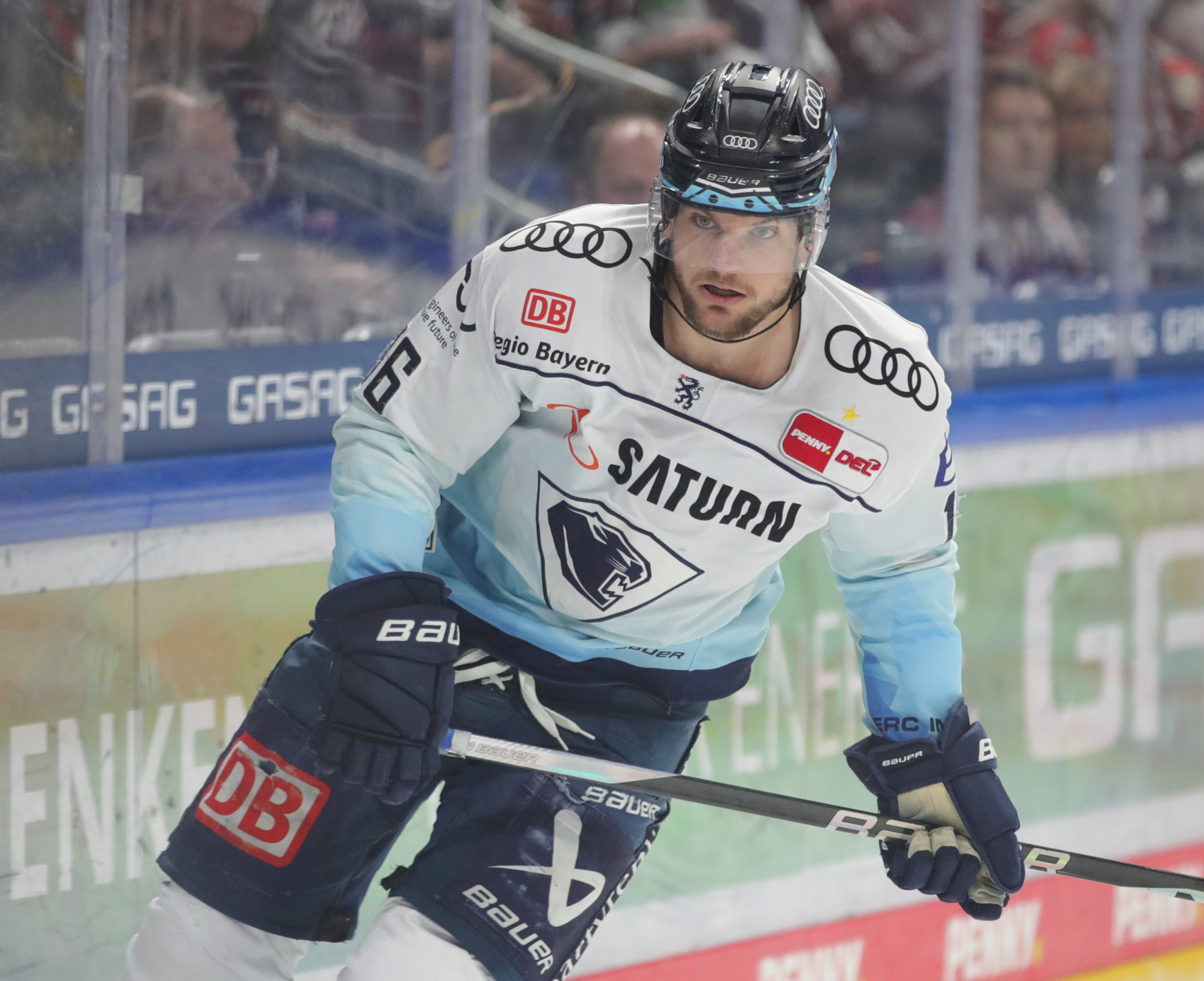
- McGinn with the ERC Ingolstadt in 2023
- Born: July 29, 1990 (age 36) Fergus, Ontario, Canada
- Height: 6 ft 2 in (188 cm)
- Weight: 205 lb (93 kg; 14 st 9 lb)
- Position: Left wing
- Shot: Left
- Played for: Philadelphia Flyers; San Jose Sharks; Arizona Coyotes; Tampa Bay Lightning; Fischtown Pinguins; ERC Ingolstadt
- NHL draft: 119th overall, 2010; Philadelphia Flyers
- Playing career: 2011–2023

Tye McGinn (born July 29, 1990) is a Canadian former professional ice hockey left winger. He is the brother of Jamie and Brock McGinn.

== Playing career ==
McGinn was drafted in the fourth round (119th overall) of the 2010 NHL entry draft by the Philadelphia Flyers. After his third season of playing in the Quebec Major Junior Hockey League for the Gatineau Olympiques, he signed a three-year entry-level contract with the Flyers on July 14, 2011. McGinn made his NHL debut on January 22, 2013 against the New Jersey Devils. His first goal was scored two games later, on January 26, 2013, against Jose Theodore of the Florida Panthers.

On February 16, 2014, McGinn was involved in a brawl with Connor Murphy and the Portland Pirates. McGinn repeatedly punched Murphy at center ice. He was ejected and immediately charged with a fighting major. The incident was part of a late-game line brawl, in which 329 penalty minutes were assessed between both teams as well as six suspensions. McGinn received a one-game suspension for his actions.

On July 2, 2014, McGinn was traded by the Flyers to the San Jose Sharks in exchange for a third round pick in the 2015 NHL entry draft. McGinn made the Sharks opening night roster for the 2014–15 season. After 32 games with the Sharks on March 2, 2015 McGinn was claimed off waivers by the Arizona Coyotes.

On July 21, 2015, McGinn signed a one-year, two-way contract with the Tampa Bay Lightning. McGinn spent the majority of the 2015–16 season with the Syracuse Crunch, only appearing in two games for the Lighting. On June 28, 2016, the Lighting re-signed McGinn to a one-year, two-way contract extension.

On August 17, 2017, the Lightning once again signed McGinn to a one-year, two-way contract extension. On November 14, 2017, the Lightning traded McGinn back to Arizona along with Michael Leighton in exchange for Louis Domingue.

Prior to the beginning of the 2018–19 season, McGinn signed a one-year contract with the Manitoba Moose on September 11, 2018. McGinn found a role on the checking line of the Moose, collecting 2 goals and 6 points in 26 games before he was traded by Manitoba to the Chicago Wolves for considerations from an NHL trade between the Moose's affiliate the Winnipeg Jets and the Vegas Golden Knights on January 3, 2019.

After going unsigned at the beginning of the 2020–21 season, McGinn opted to pursue a career overseas, signing a contract for the remainder of the season with the Fischtown Penguins of the DEL on January 12, 2021. On June 23, 2022, he signed a one-year contract with ERC Ingolstadt of the DEL.

In October 2023, the Elora Rocks of the Western Ontario Super Hockey League announced McGinn would be playing with the team for the 2023/24 season. However, it was announced later that day that plans had changed, and McGinn would not be suiting up for the team.

== Career statistics ==
			Regular season					Playoffs
Season	Team	League	GP	G	A	Pts	PIM	GP	G	A	Pts	PIM
2007–08	Ottawa 67's	OHL	59	3	8	11	25	4	0	0	0	2
2008–09	Gatineau Olympiques	QMJHL	48	8	22	30	25	10	7	6	13	19
2009–10	Gatineau Olympiques	QMJHL	50	27	35	62	50	10	2	5	7	12
2010–11	Gatineau Olympiques	QMJHL	42	31	33	64	39	14	5	8	13	17
2011–12	Adirondack Phantoms	AHL	63	12	6	18	45	—	—	—	—	—
2012–13	Adirondack Phantoms	AHL	46	14	12	26	54	—	—	—	—	—
2012–13	Philadelphia Flyers	NHL	18	3	2	5	19	—	—	—	—	—
2013–14	Adirondack Phantoms	AHL	54	20	15	35	62	—	—	—	—	—
2013–14	Philadelphia Flyers	NHL	18	4	1	5	4	—	—	—	—	—
2014–15	San Jose Sharks	NHL	32	1	4	5	11	—	—	—	—	—
2014–15	Arizona Coyotes	NHL	18	1	1	2	10	—	—	—	—	—
2015–16	Syracuse Crunch	AHL	72	20	24	44	53	—	—	—	—	—
2015–16	Tampa Bay Lightning	NHL	2	0	0	0	0	—	—	—	—	—
2016–17	Syracuse Crunch	AHL	21	10	9	19	16	22	5	11	16	12
2017–18	Syracuse Crunch	AHL	11	2	3	5	29	—	—	—	—	—
2017–18	Tucson Roadrunners	AHL	44	8	10	18	43	6	0	0	0	4
2018–19	Manitoba Moose	AHL	26	2	4	6	38	—	—	—	—	—
2018–19	Chicago Wolves	AHL	36	10	2	12	16	22	6	7	13	12
2019–20	Chicago Wolves	AHL	61	17	13	30	62	—	—	—	—	—
2020–21	Fischtown Pinguins	DEL	27	8	11	19	12	3	1	2	3	4
2021–22	Fischtown Pinguins	DEL	51	13	20	33	32	5	0	3	3	36
2022–23	ERC Ingolstadt	DEL	47	8	15	23	41	15	4	3	7	17
NHL totals			89	9	8	17	44	—	—	—	—	—
