= Slater Koekkoek =

Canadian ice hockey player (born 1994)

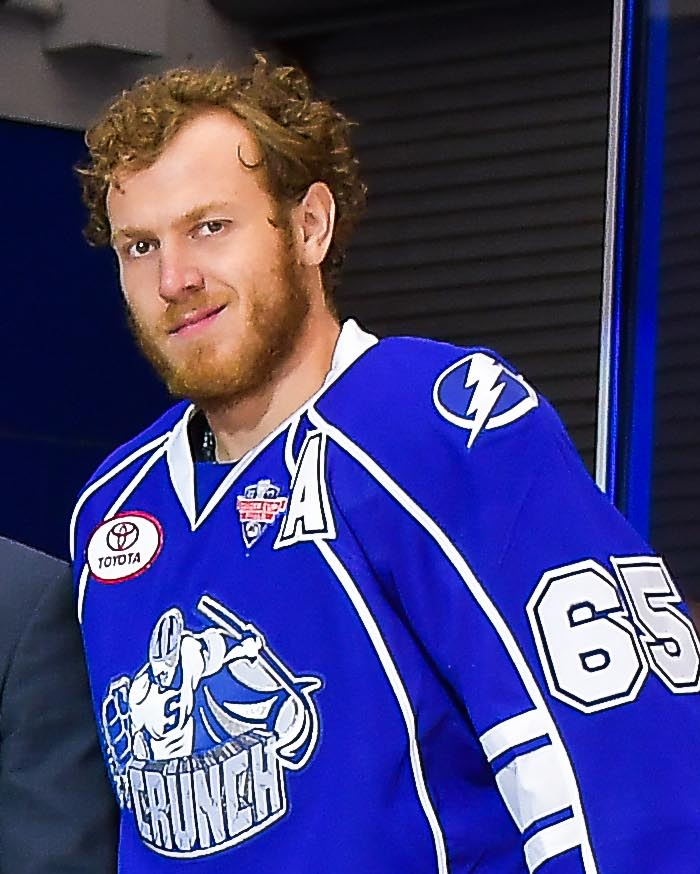
- Koekkoek with the Syracuse Crunch in 2017
- Born: February 18, 1994 (age 32) North Dundas, Ontario, Canada
- Height: 6 ft 2 in (188 cm)
- Weight: 200 lb (91 kg; 14 st 4 lb)
- Position: Defence
- Shot: Left
- Played for: Tampa Bay Lightning; Chicago Blackhawks; Edmonton Oilers
- NHL draft: 10th overall, 2012; Tampa Bay Lightning
- Playing career: 2014–2022

Slater Koekkoek (/ˈkuːkuː/ KOO-koo; born February 18, 1994) is a Canadian former professional ice hockey defenceman who played in the National Hockey League (NHL). Koekkoek was originally selected by the Tampa Bay Lightning, 10th overall, in the 2012 NHL entry draft.

== Playing career ==
=== Junior ===
Koekkoek was a first round selection of the Peterborough Petes in the 2010 OHL Priority Selection. Koekkoek played 4 seasons and 195 games in the Ontario Hockey League having played 131 games with the Peterborough Petes and 64 with the Windsor Spitfires. During his 2nd season with the Peterborough Petes he only played in 26 games before suffering a season-ending shoulder injury in November. He was traded mid-season to Windsor on January 10, 2013, and in his last season, he set a career high and recorded 15 goals and 53 points, and finished with a +44 rating and 51 penalty minutes.

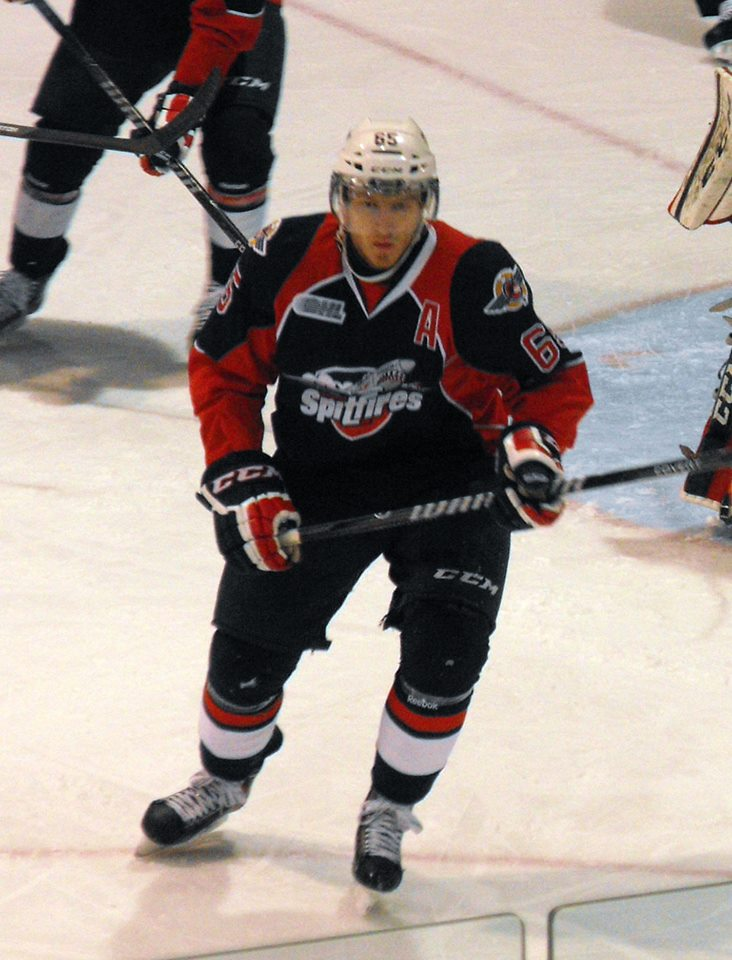
Koekkoek with the Windsor Spitfires in 2013

=== Professional ===
Koekkoek was selected 10th overall in the 2012 NHL entry draft by the Tampa Bay Lightning. He was signed by the Lightning to a three-year entry-level contract on March 20, 2013, and was assigned to the Canadian Hockey League the first 2 years. Koekkoek made his professional hockey debut on October 12, 2014, against the Hartford Wolf Pack. In 66 games with the Crunch, Koekkoek had five goals and 24 points to go along with 40 penalty minutes. Koekkoek led all Crunch defensemen in assists (19) and points (24). He also is tied for fifth among American Hockey League rookie defensemen in points.

Koekkoek made his NHL debut with the Tampa Bay Lightning on March 31, 2015, in his home province of Ontario losing 3–1 against the Toronto Maple Leafs recording 2 shots and a –1 rating. Koekkoek skated 15:31 in the game. Lightning head coach Jon Cooper stated that "he can be proud of how he played," and that "he was up in the play, and he did some good things. He defended well, and I was happy with him." On April 8, 2015, the Tampa Bay Lightning announced that Koekkoek had been reassigned to the Syracuse Crunch of the American Hockey League. Koekkoek skated in three games with the Lightning, recording two penalty minutes and six shots.

On March 7, 2016, Koekkoek recorded his first career NHL assist and first NHL point in a 2–4 loss to the Philadelphia Flyers. On April 30, 2016, Koekkoek appeared in his first NHL playoff game, which was a 4–1 Lightning win over the New York Islanders. On May 24, 2016, Koekkoek recorded his first career playoff assist and point, which came in a 2–5 Lightning loss to the Pittsburgh Penguins.

On July 3, 2017, Koekkoek signed a one-year, $800,000 contract extension with the Lightning. On October 12, 2017, Koekkoek recorded his first and second career NHL goals. Koekkoek's second goal was the game-winning goal in a 5–4 Lightning win over the visiting Pittsburgh Penguins.

During the 2018–19 season, with Koekkoek unable to establish himself on the Championship contending Lightning and having been passed on the depth chart, Koekkoek was traded by the Lightning along with a 2019 fifth-round pick to the Chicago Blackhawks in exchange for Jan Rutta and a 2019 seventh-round pick on January 11, 2019.

As a free agent from the Blackhawks, on December 26, 2020, Koekkoek was signed to a one-year, $850,000 deal with the Edmonton Oilers. On August 12, he signed a two-year contract extension with the Oilers.

Koekkok played 19 games for the Oilers in the 2021–22 season. While he remained under contract to the Oilers organization, Koekkoek stepped away from the team before the 2022–23 training camp. On March 15, 2023, Koekkoek revealed via his LinkedIn profile that he had stepped away from hockey "because my life inside of it had gotten to a place that was unbearable and unhealthy towards my mental health". In the post, he shared that he had experienced issues with anxiety and the inability to eat.

== International play ==
Koekkoek first competed at the international stage at the 2011 World U-17 Hockey Challenge in helping Canada Ontario claim the gold medal.

Koekkoek represented the Canadian under-18 national team at the 2011 IIHF World U18 Championships, where he had two points in seven games and helped Canada win bronze medals. In the 2011 Ivan Hlinka Memorial Tournament, Koekkoek served as an alternate captain, where he led Canada to the gold medal with his defensive scoring with five points in five games.

== Personal life ==
Koekkoek is married to Santana Campanale Koekkoek who is the director of sales and marketing with Campanale Homes which was co-founded by her father and uncles in 1979. During his hiatus from hockey in June 2023, he established FFYLwork (pronounced "fulfill work"), a staffing company that connects employees seeking casual, flexible shifts with companies.

== Career statistics ==
=== Regular season and playoffs ===
			Regular season					Playoffs
Season	Team	League	GP	G	A	Pts	PIM	GP	G	A	Pts	PIM
2008–09	Notre Dame Hounds	SMHL	5	0	1	1	2	—	—	—	—	—
2009–10	Notre Dame Hounds	SMHL	44	16	27	43	91	13	3	4	7	6
2010–11	Peterborough Petes	OHL	65	7	16	23	67	—	—	—	—	—
2011–12	Peterborough Petes	OHL	26	5	13	18	17	—	—	—	—	—
2012–13	Peterborough Petes	OHL	40	6	22	28	28	—	—	—	—	—
2012–13	Windsor Spitfires	OHL	2	0	1	1	0	—	—	—	—	—
2013–14	Windsor Spitfires	OHL	62	15	38	53	51	—	—	—	—	—
2014–15	Syracuse Crunch	AHL	72	5	21	26	44	3	0	1	1	6
2014–15	Tampa Bay Lightning	NHL	3	0	0	0	2	—	—	—	—	—
2015–16	Syracuse Crunch	AHL	60	5	10	15	26	—	—	—	—	—
2015–16	Tampa Bay Lightning	NHL	9	0	1	1	2	10	0	1	1	2
2016–17	Syracuse Crunch	AHL	48	2	11	13	14	22	1	6	7	16
2016–17	Tampa Bay Lightning	NHL	29	0	4	4	8	—	—	—	—	—
2017–18	Tampa Bay Lightning	NHL	35	4	4	8	18	—	—	—	—	—
2018–19	Tampa Bay Lightning	NHL	9	1	0	1	4	—	—	—	—	—
2018–19	Syracuse Crunch	AHL	5	0	1	1	2	—	—	—	—	—
2018–19	Chicago Blackhawks	NHL	22	1	4	5	10	—	—	—	—	—
2019–20	Chicago Blackhawks	NHL	42	1	9	10	42	9	1	2	3	2
2020–21	Edmonton Oilers	NHL	18	1	0	1	2	4	0	1	1	0
2021–22	Edmonton Oilers	NHL	19	0	4	4	16	—	—	—	—	—
2021–22	Bakersfield Condors	AHL	2	0	1	1	0	—	—	—	—	—
NHL totals			186	8	26	34	104	23	1	4	5	4

=== International ===
Year	Team	Event	Result	GP	G	A	Pts	PIM
2011	Canada Ontario	U17	1st place, gold medalist(s)	5	1	2	3	8
2011	Canada	IH18	1st place, gold medalist(s)	5	0	5	5	0
2011	Canada	U18	4th	7	1	1	2	2
Junior totals				17	2	8	10	10

== Awards and honours ==
Award	Year
OHL
Second All-Rookie Team	2011
First All-Star Team	2014

Awards and achievements
Preceded by Vladislav Namestnikov	Tampa Bay Lightning first-round draft pick 2012	Succeeded by Andrei Vasilevskiy
