= Michael Leighton =

Canadian ice hockey player (born 1981)

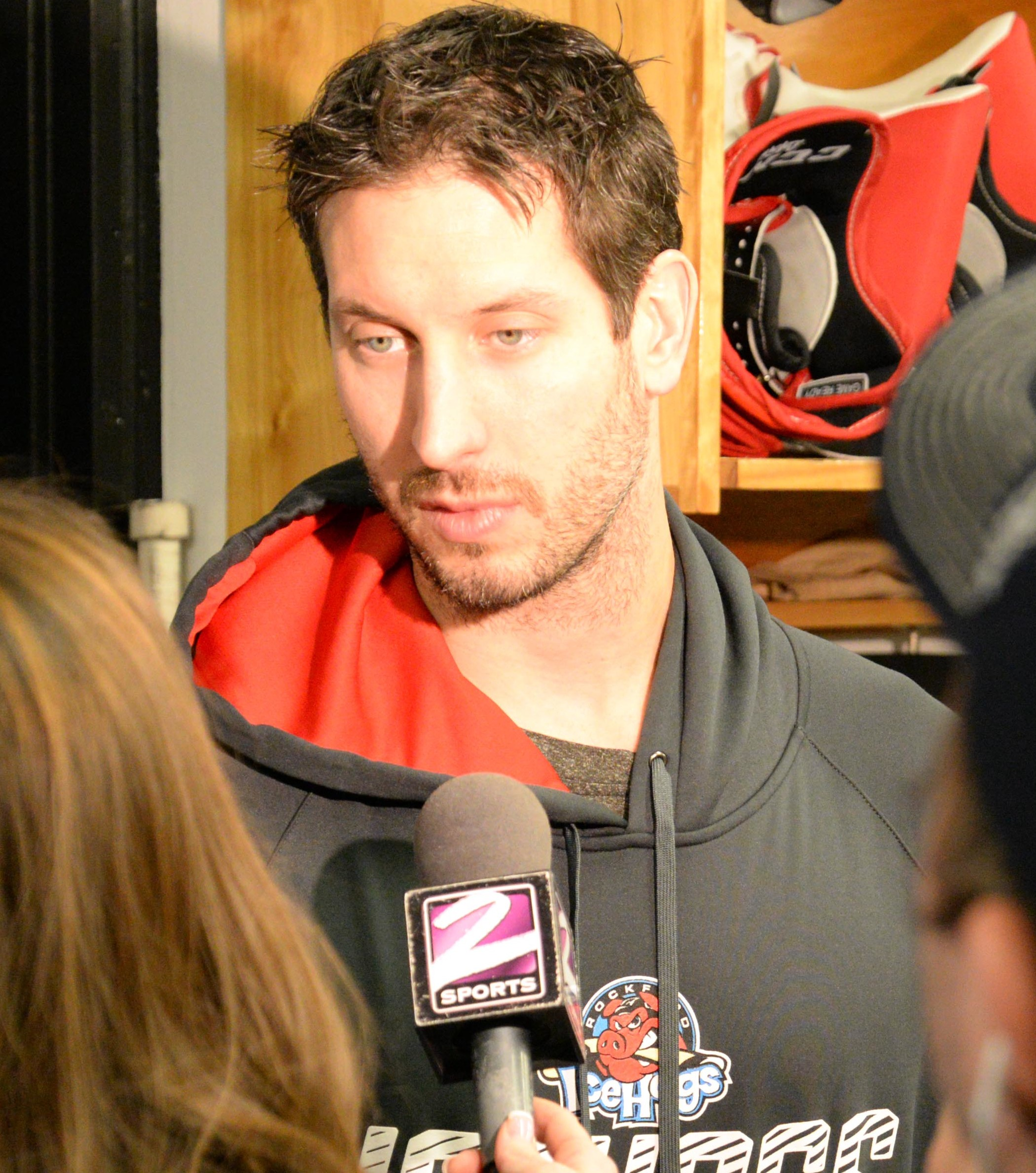
- Leighton with the Rockford IceHogs in 2016
- Born: May 19, 1981 (age 45) Petrolia, Ontario, Canada
- Height: 6 ft 3 in (191 cm)
- Weight: 186 lb (84 kg; 13 st 4 lb)
- Position: Goaltender
- Caught: Left
- Played for: Chicago Blackhawks; Nashville Predators; Philadelphia Flyers; Carolina Hurricanes; HC Donbass
- NHL draft: 165th overall, 1999; Chicago Blackhawks
- Playing career: 2001–2019

Michael W. Leighton (born May 19, 1981) is a Canadian former professional ice hockey goaltender who played in the National Hockey League (NHL) with the Chicago Blackhawks, Nashville Predators, Philadelphia Flyers and Carolina Hurricanes. He is currently an assistant coach with the Detroit Red Wings.

== Playing career ==
Leighton grew up playing minor hockey in his hometown of Petrolia, Ontario, for the Petrolia Oilers of the Ontario Minor Hockey Association's Bluewater League. He played in the 1995 Quebec International Pee-Wee Hockey Tournament with a minor ice hockey team from Lambton County. At age 16, he played for the Petrolia Jets Jr.B. team of the Ontario Hockey Association's Western Ontario Hockey League before being drafted by the Ontario Hockey League (OHL)'s Windsor Spitfires in the third round, 56th overall, of the 1998 OHL Priority Selection.

Leighton began impressing scouts while playing for the Spitfires. Following his rookie season, he was drafted by the Chicago Blackhawks in the sixth round of the 1999 NHL entry draft with the 165th overall pick. He played two more seasons in the OHL before signing an entry-level contract with the Blackhawks prior to the 2001–02 season.

Leighton played two seasons in the American Hockey League (AHL) for the Norfolk Admirals before making his NHL debut on January 8, 2003. He became the first Blackhawks player to record a shutout in his debut during a scoreless tie against the Phoenix Coyotes' Zac Bierk. Bierk also earned his first career shutout, although it was not his NHL debut. It was the first time that two goaltenders in the same game both earned their first career shutouts. Leighton would compete with Craig Anderson for backup duties with Chicago, having never spent a complete season in the NHL with the team.

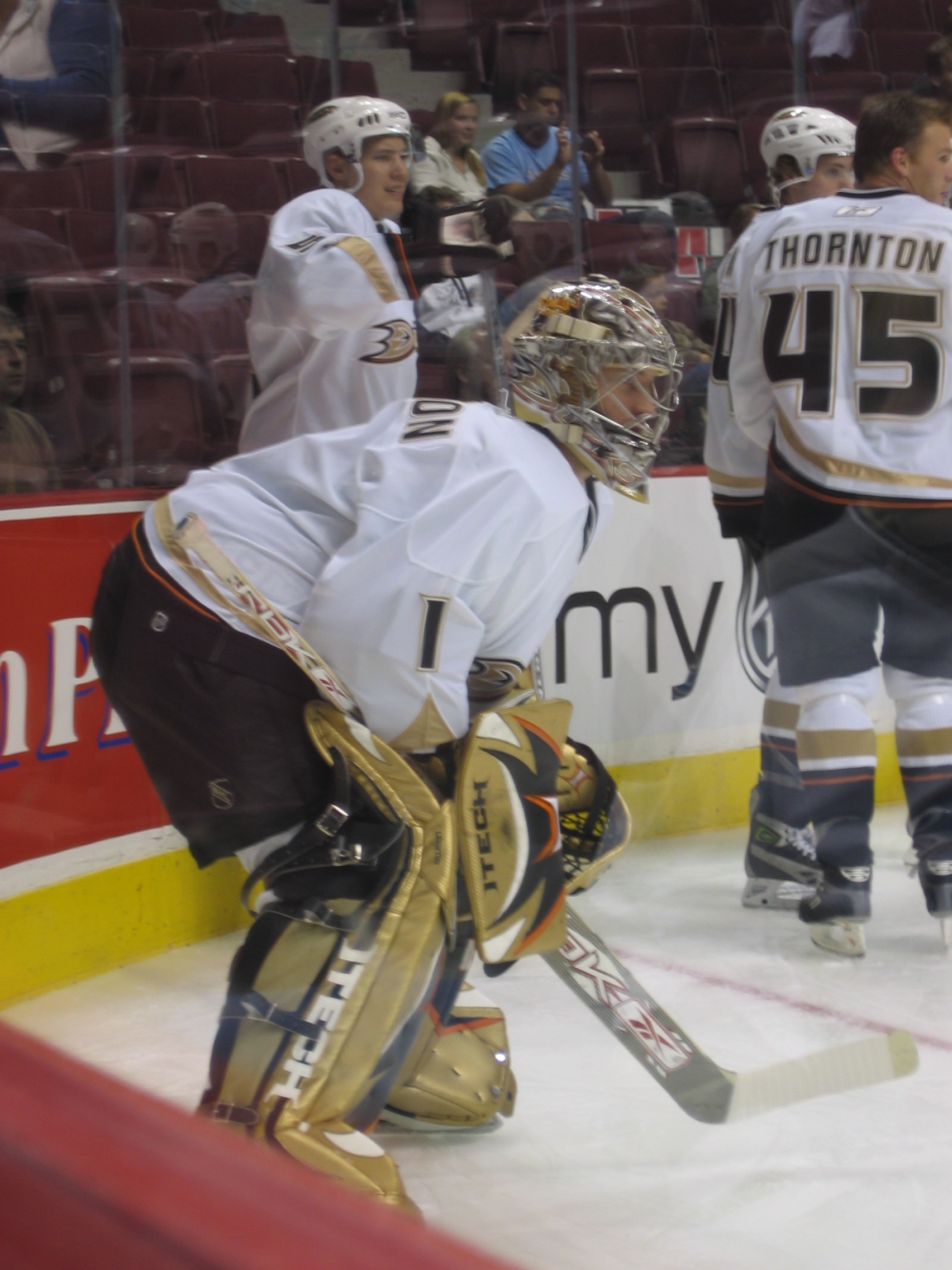
Leighton with Anaheim during the 2006–07 pre-season

Leighton would continue to play in the Blackhawks' organization until October 4, 2005, when he was traded to the Buffalo Sabres in exchange for Milan Bartovič. He did not appear in a game with the Sabres, as he spent the season with their AHL affiliate, the Rochester Americans. Buffalo did not tender him a qualifying offer in the off-season and he became an unrestricted free agent. On July 13, 2006, Leighton signed as a free agent with the Anaheim Ducks, and the organization assigned him to their AHL affiliate, the Portland Pirates, following training camp. When both Ilya Bryzgalov and Jean-Sébastien Giguère were injured, the Ducks recalled him on November 27 to start. However, he was claimed off waivers by the Nashville Predators. After appearing in just 20 minutes of one game with the Predators, Leighton was again placed on waivers, and this time was claimed by the Philadelphia Flyers on January 11, 2007.

The Flyers placed him on a ten-game conditioning stint with the Philadelphia Phantoms, but recalled him early as Robert Esche was injured. Leighton backed-up Antero Niittymäki for one game before making his first NHL start in nearly three years on February 10, 2007, in a win against the St. Louis Blues. After playing four games with the last-place Flyers, Leighton was once again placed on waivers. He was picked up by the Montreal Canadiens on February 27, but he finished the season without playing a game for his new team. Montreal traded him in the off-season to the Carolina Hurricanes in exchange for a seventh-round pick in the 2007 NHL entry draft. Carolina originally assigned him to their AHL affiliate Albany River Rats, but brought him back to the NHL on January 3, 2008, when John Grahame was sent to Albany after being placed on waivers. Leighton appeared in three games for the Hurricanes, with a record of 1–1–0, before returning to Albany on January 21 as Grahame was recalled to the NHL team. On April 24, 2008, Leighton set an AHL record making 98 saves on 101 shots, in a playoff game that went to five overtimes, also an AHL record.

Leighton was the Hurricanes' backup goaltender, behind Cam Ward, during the 2008–09 season. He appeared in 19 regular season games but did not play in the playoffs, when the Hurricanes advanced to the Eastern Conference Finals. In November 2009, Ward suffered a leg injury which caused him to miss more than a month of play; during that time, the team signed veteran Manny Legace, who became the backup when Ward returned. Leighton was then expendable. On December 15, 2009, Leighton was claimed off waivers by the Flyers organization in order to back-up Brian Boucher while Ray Emery recovered from injury. On December 21, Boucher suffered an injury, and Leighton found himself in a starting role. On December 26, just 11 days after being waived, Leighton returned to Raleigh, North Carolina, as the Flyers defeated Carolina 4–3 in a shootout. Leighton earned the start in goal for the Flyers on January 1 at the 2010 Winter Classic. He performed well on the national stage, but the Flyers ultimately fell to the Boston Bruins 2–1 in overtime.

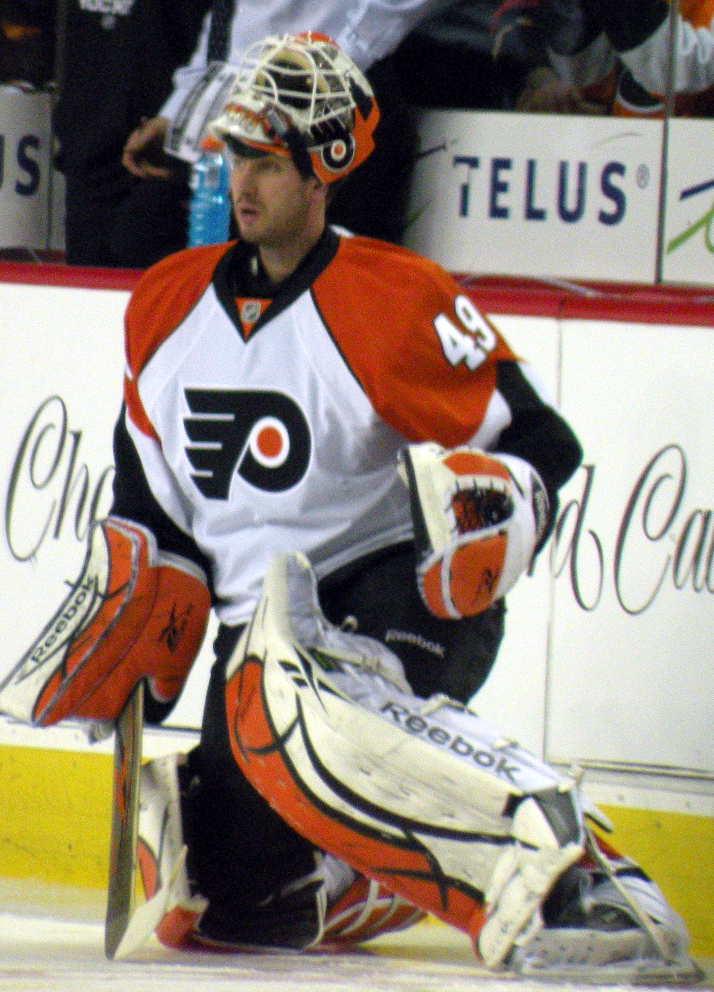
Leighton with the Philadelphia Flyers in 2010

After the Winter Classic, Emery returned, and Leighton officially supplanted Boucher as the backup. Emery played his final game in February 2010, however, when he was diagnosed with a genetic hip disorder. Leighton carried the load with some great success, but his regular season came to an end in Nashville in March, forcing Boucher back into the spotlight. On May 10, 2010, Boucher was once again injured in a playoff game against the Bruins. Leighton stepped in for his first ever NHL playoff action to continue Boucher's shutout, with the Flyers ultimately winning 4–0. At that point, Leighton had not even been dressing as he was still recovering from the injury sustained in Nashville, and the Game 5 he relieved Boucher in was his first game dressing since March. Leighton then started and won the next two games, helping the Flyers achieve a feat only three other teams in NHL history have been able to ever accomplish (1941–42 Toronto Maple Leafs, 1974–75 New York Islanders and 2013–14 Los Angeles Kings) to come back from a 3–0 deficit and win a series.

In the 2010 Eastern Conference Finals against the Montreal Canadiens, Leighton allowed only seven goals in five games, posting three shutouts as the seventh-seeded Flyers advanced to the Stanley Cup Finals against his former team, the Chicago Blackhawks. Leighton started all six games of the Final series, though Boucher finished Game 1, a 6–5 Blackhawks win, and Game 5, a 7–4 Blackhawks win. Boucher was the losing goaltender of record in both games. Leighton struggled in the finals, posting a goals against average of 3.96 and a save percentage of 0.876 as Chicago defeated Philadelphia four games to two, ending with an overtime goal by Patrick Kane.

On June 30, 2010, Leighton signed a new two-year contract with the Flyers, just one day before he was set to become an unrestricted free agent, with the intention of making him the Flyers' starting goaltender after Emery was not retained. On October 8, 2010, it was reported Leighton would have back surgery. He was expected to miss six-to-eight weeks. He made his 2010–11 debut on December 30, 2010, against the Los Angeles Kings, earning the win but allowing four goals away at the Staples Center. However, in his absence, rookie Sergei Bobrovsky and Brian Boucher had played well, creating a three-way goaltending competition in the Flyers crease.

On January 3, 2011, the three-way goaltender competition was resolved after Flyers general manager Paul Holmgren reported Leighton was placed on waivers. Leighton cleared waivers the next day and was assigned to the Adirondack Phantoms. Three months later he was placed on re-entry waivers and after clearing, re-joined the Flyers. Leighton played in two playoff games.

After spending the entire 2011–12 season in the AHL with the Phantoms, Leighton re-signed with the Flyers with a one-year contract on July 1, 2012, and was slotted to serve as the backup goaltender behind starter Ilya Bryzgalov. After playing in just one game for the Flyers during the 2011–12 season, Leighton was traded at the NHL trade deadline to the Columbus Blue Jackets (along with a third-round pick in the 2015 NHL entry draft) in exchange for Steve Mason. Leighton served as Sergei Bobrovsky's backup for the remainder of the season, but did not see any ice-time. An unrestricted free agent the following the season, on August 19, 2013, Leighton signed a one-year contract with HC Donbass of the Kontinental Hockey League (KHL).

On May 28, 2014, Leighton signed a one-year contract with HC Sochi of the KHL. Leighton's contract was subsequently voided after an illness prevented him from attending training camp.

On August 18, 2014, Leighton signed a one-year, two-way contract with the team he began his NHL career with, the Chicago Blackhawks. During the Blackhawks' training camp, Leighton was assigned (along with centre Peter Regin) to Chicago's AHL affiliate, the Rockford IceHogs, after clearing waivers. The Blackhawks recalled Leighton from the IceHogs following an injury to starting goaltender Corey Crawford. He primarily served as back-up to Scott Darling. Leighton made only one relief appearance for the Blackhawks on March 22, 2016, allowing one goal and stopping 17 shots against the Dallas Stars. Leighton remained with the Blackhawks after Crawford returned for the 2016 Stanley Cup playoffs, but was a healthy scratch for all seven of the team's playoff games.

After two seasons with the Blackhawks organization, Leighton left as a free agent. On September 7, 2016, Leighton signed a one-year, two-way contract with another former club, the Carolina Hurricanes.

On July 1, 2017, Leighton left the Hurricanes to sign a one-year, two-way free agent contract with the Tampa Bay Lightning. He was re-assigned to begin the 2017–18 season with Tampa Bay's AHL affiliate, the Syracuse Crunch. Added to provide a veteran presence and mentoring role to Connor Ingram, Leighton got off to an average start after winning just three of his nine games. On November 14, 2017, the Lightning traded Leighton (along with Tye McGinn) to the Arizona Coyotes in exchange for Louis Domingue. With the Coyotes' AHL affiliate, the Tucson Roadrunners, already with three rostered goaltending prospects, Leighton was loaned to the Chicago Wolves on November 21, 2017. Leighton appeared in five games with the Wolves before he was re-assigned to the Roadrunners on December 14, 2017. On December 19, the Coyotes traded Leighton (along with a fourth-round pick in the 2019 NHL entry draft) to the Pittsburgh Penguins in exchange for Josh Archibald, Sean Maguire and a seventh-round pick in the 2017 NHL entry draft.

Leighton entered the 2018–19 season as a free agent. On November 16, 2018, he continued his professional career after signing a professional try-out (PTO) contract with the injury-hit Ontario Reign of the AHL, the top affiliate of the Los Angeles Kings. He appeared in three games with the Reign before he was released from his PTO and later signed to another AHL try-out contract with the Utica Comets on January 15, 2019. After collecting six wins in his first seven starts for the Comets, Leighton agreed to a one-year, two-way contract with NHL affiliate, the Vancouver Canucks, for the remainder of the season on February 19, 2019. After clearing waivers the following day he was assigned to continue with the Comets.

On October 7, 2019, Leighton announced his retirement from professional hockey after 18 seasons.

Leighton was inducted into the AHL Hall of Fame in 2025.

Leighton is currently the goaltending coach on Todd McLellan's Detroit Red Wings coaching staff.

== Personal ==
Leighton moved to Sarnia when he was four years old. For the last ten years, Leighton has lived in LaSalle, Ontario, with his wife Jennifer and their three children. All three kids play hockey and Leighton is helping with their teams.

== Records ==
- NHL record for most shutouts in one Stanley Cup Playoffs series: 3, in the 2010 Eastern Conference Finals against the Montreal Canadiens (tied with several other goalies)
- Norfolk Admirals franchise record for most career regular season wins: 75
- Norfolk Admirals franchise record for most career regular season shutouts: 18
- First goaltender in Chicago Blackhawks history to record a shutout in his debut
- Most saves in an AHL game: 98
- HC Donbass franchise record for most regular season shutouts in a season: 6
- HC Donbass franchise record for most career regular season shutouts: 6
- Played in the second longest game in AHL history, as well as the second longest game in KHL history
- AHL record for most career shutouts: 50

== Career statistics ==
=== Regular season and playoffs ===
			Regular season									Playoffs
Season	Team	League	GP	W	L	T/OT	MIN	GA	SO	GAA	SV%	GP	W	L	MIN	GA	SO	GAA	SV%
1997–98	Petrolia Jets	OHA-B	30	—	—	—	1583	87	2	3.30	—	—	—	—	—	—	—	—	—
1998–99	Windsor Spitfires	OHL	28	4	17	2	1389	112	0	4.84	.867	3	0	1	80	10	0	7.50	.884
1999–00	Windsor Spitfires	OHL	42	17	17	2	2272	118	1	3.12	.889	12	5	6	616	32	0	3.12	.915
2000–01	Windsor Spitfires	OHL	54	32	13	5	3035	138	2	2.73	.910	9	4	5	519	27	1	3.12	.906
2001–02	Norfolk Admirals	AHL	52	27	16	8	3114	111	6	2.14	.920	4	1	2	238	8	0	2.02	.927
2002–03	Norfolk Admirals	AHL	36	18	13	5	2184	91	4	2.50	.912	4	3	1	240	7	1	1.75	.931
2002–03	Chicago Blackhawks	NHL	8	2	3	2	447	21	1	2.82	.913	—	—	—	—	—	—	—	—
2003–04	Norfolk Admirals	AHL	18	10	7	1	1081	33	1	1.83	.926	4	2	1	212	2	2	0.56	.978
2003–04	Chicago Blackhawks	NHL	34	6	18	8	1988	99	2	2.99	.900	—	—	—	—	—	—	—	—
2004–05	Norfolk Admirals	AHL	41	20	16	3	2319	78	7	2.02	.921	—	—	—	—	—	—	—	—
2005–06	Rochester Americans	AHL	40	15	22	1	2316	124	2	3.21	.887	—	—	—	—	—	—	—	—
2006–07	Portland Pirates	AHL	16	8	6	1	962	37	2	2.31	.910	—	—	—	—	—	—	—	—
2006–07	Nashville Predators	NHL	1	0	0	0	20	2	0	6.00	.800	—	—	—	—	—	—	—	—
2006–07	Philadelphia Phantoms	AHL	5	2	0	2	270	7	0	1.56	.948	—	—	—	—	—	—	—	—
2006–07	Philadelphia Flyers	NHL	4	2	2	0	195	12	0	3.69	.882	—	—	—	—	—	—	—	—
2007–08	Albany River Rats	AHL	58	28	25	4	3451	121	7	2.10	.931	7	3	4	510	10	2	1.18	.968
2007–08	Carolina Hurricanes	NHL	3	1	1	0	158	7	0	2.66	.897	—	—	—	—	—	—	—	—
2008–09	Carolina Hurricanes	NHL	19	6	7	2	1029	50	0	2.92	.901	—	—	—	—	—	—	—	—
2009–10	Carolina Hurricanes	NHL	7	1	4	0	350	25	0	4.28	.850	—	—	—	—	—	—	—	—
2009–10	Philadelphia Flyers	NHL	27	16	5	2	1449	60	1	2.48	.920	14	8	3	757	31	3	2.46	.916
2010–11	Adirondack Phantoms	AHL	30	14	12	3	1783	66	5	2.22	.926	—	—	—	—	—	—	—	—
2010–11	Philadelphia Flyers	NHL	1	1	0	0	60	4	0	4.00	.889	2	0	1	70	4	0	3.43	.862
2011–12	Adirondack Phantoms	AHL	56	28	26	1	3237	139	2	2.58	.918	—	—	—	—	—	—	—	—
2012–13	Philadelphia Flyers	NHL	1	0	1	0	59	5	0	5.08	.808	—	—	—	—	—	—	—	—
2012–13	Adirondack Phantoms	AHL	2	1	1	0	119	4	0	2.02	.933	—	—	—	—	—	—	—	—
2013–14	Donbass	KHL	42	20	15	6	2448	71	6	1.74	.933	8	3	4	467	20	0	2.57	.908
2014–15	Rockford IceHogs	AHL	42	22	13	4	2391	90	5	2.26	.920	8	4	3	440	19	0	2.59	.919
2015–16	Rockford IceHogs	AHL	46	28	8	8	2585	105	5	2.44	.918	—	—	—	—	—	—	—	—
2015–16	Chicago Blackhawks	NHL	1	0	0	0	40	1	0	1.52	.941	—	—	—	—	—	—	—	—
2016–17	Charlotte Checkers	AHL	23	11	7	3	1326	48	3	2.17	.921	1	0	1	52	1	0	1.15	.933
2016–17	Carolina Hurricanes	NHL	4	2	2	0	211	12	0	3.43	.870	—	—	—	—	—	—	—	—
2017–18	Syracuse Crunch	AHL	9	3	3	2	476	24	0	3.03	.868	—	—	—	—	—	—	—	—
2017–18	Chicago Wolves	AHL	5	1	1	2	247	14	1	3.40	.869	—	—	—	—	—	—	—	—
2017–18	Wilkes-Barre/Scranton Penguins	AHL	6	5	0	1	383	17	0	2.67	.913	—	—	—	—	—	—	—	—
2018–19	Ontario Reign	AHL	3	1	1	0	162	12	0	4.46	.859	—	—	—	—	—	—	—	—
2018–19	Utica Comets	AHL	19	8	9	1	1065	48	0	2.70	.901	—	—	—	—	—	—	—	—
AHL totals			507	250	186	50	29,471	1,169	50	2.38	.916	28	13	12	1,692	47	5	1.67	.946
NHL totals			110	37	43	14	6,004	298	4	2.98	.900	16	8	4	827	35	3	2.54	.913

== Awards and honours ==
Award	Year
OHL
All-Star Team West	2000
AHL
AHL All-Rookie Team	2002
Aldege "Baz" Bastien Memorial Award	2008
First All-Star Team	2008
AHL All-Star Classic	2002, 2008, 2012, 2016, 2017
AHL Hall of Fame	2025

Awards and achievements
Preceded by Jason LaBarbera	Aldege "Baz" Bastien Memorial Award; 2007–08	Succeeded by Cory Schneider
