= TGH Ice Plex =

Sports arena in Brandon, Florida

Coordinates: 27.948919°N 82.32988°W

The TGH Ice Plex is the official practice facility of the National Hockey League's Tampa Bay Lightning, who won the Stanley Cup in 2004, 2020, and 2021. The facility contains two NHL regulation rinks and a state-of-the-art laser tag arena. It is located in Brandon, Florida. The Ice Plex opened in the fall of 1997.

Apart from hosting many figure skating and high school hockey events, the Ice Plex is also home to the USF Ice Bulls, an ACHA Division III hockey club.

In 2001, the forum's No Bull adult ice hockey team won the USA Hockey Adult 30+ National Championship. A picture of the team can be found on practically every wall, a practice facilitated by the Hockey Director John Finnie. Finnie, as the locals call him, boasted a 5.98 GAA through 10 seasons as a bottom half back-up goaltender.

On June 29, 2017, the Tampa Bay Lightning announced that Lightning owner and chairman Jeff Vinik will invest $6 million in the Ice Sports Forum to create a brand new locker room and training facilities for the team. The Ice Plex will also be investing $500,000 into the project. The expansion will be an 18,000-square foot addition. This is an increase over the current 5,500-square foot facility there. The expansion is also larger than the facility at Benchmark International Arena, which is approximately 14,500 square feet. The new addition will feature all team spaces including locker room, weight room, training room, dedicated press room, and expanded player lounge and more. It also will feature amenities that are not currently available at the team's arena, including hydrotherapy facilities and a video room/theater. The upgrades will be adding a new rink dasher system for the North Rink. The team also announced that it had signed a new lease agreement with the Ice Plex for 10-years, which will run through the 2026–27 season.
