= NHL 100 Classic =

Outdoor National Hockey League game

	1	2	3	Total
Montreal Canadiens	0	0	0	0
Ottawa Senators	0	1	2	3
- Date: December 16, 2017
- Venue: TD Place Stadium
- City: Ottawa
- Attendance: 33,959

The NHL 100 Classic (branded as the Scotiabank NHL 100 Classic for sponsorship reasons) was a regular season outdoor National Hockey League (NHL) game held on December 16, 2017. The game featured the Ottawa Senators playing the Montreal Canadiens at TD Place Stadium in Ottawa (referred to as "Lansdowne Park" due to naming rights conflicts with an official sponsor of the NHL). It was the first of the three scheduled outdoor regular season games in the 2017–18 NHL season.

As part of the NHL's centennial and local celebrations of Canada's sesquicentennial, the game was a rematch of one of the first two NHL games held on December 19, 1917, played between the Canadiens and the original Ottawa Senators. The Senators shut out the Canadiens, 3–0, with Ottawa goalie Craig Anderson making 28 saves.

It marked the first outdoor game hosted by Ottawa, and the second that Ottawa has participated in; they previously faced the Vancouver Canucks in the 2014 Heritage Classic. This was Montreal's fourth time appearing in an outdoor game.

== Background ==
The NHL 100 Classic was announced during a press conference on March 17, 2017. As part of the league's centennial celebrations, the game honoured the 100th anniversary of the first games of the NHL's inaugural season, held on December 19, 1917. Two games were played that night. In Ottawa, the original Ottawa Senators hosted the Montreal Canadiens at the Ottawa Arena. The other game was played in Montreal at the Montreal Arena where the Montreal Wanderers hosted the Toronto Arenas. The game was also part of Ottawa's festivities for the Canadian sesquicentennial. According to NHL commissioner Gary Bettman: "To launch our next 100 years, we believe it is only right to bring the Canadiens and the Senators back together."

Mayor of Ottawa Jim Watson remarked that he had spent a significant amount of time to convince the NHL to hold an outdoor game in Ottawa, noting that "at some point I think I could be accused of harassment – borderline harassment – for the calls that went back and forth between my office and the NHL and the Senators. But it all came together." At one point, the game was proposed to be played at a temporary venue on Parliament Hill, but the proposal was denied by the Department of Canadian Heritage due to logistical concerns. The league also explored holding the outdoor game on November 26, 2017, on the 100th anniversary of the league's founding. The league also felt that the 25,000-seat Percival Molson Memorial Stadium in Montreal was too small to host such a game.

Senators owner Eugene Melnyk suggested that an outdoor game involving the Senators' American Hockey League (AHL) affiliate, the Belleville Senators (who moved from Binghamton, New York before the 2017–18 season) could be held as an undercard to the game, but this was not feasible.

== Other festivities ==
Outside in Lansdowne Park, and inside the Aberdeen Pavilion, a "Pre-Game" area was set up. The area hosted the Stanley Cup for pictures, and various sponsors and media set up interactive exhibits and games. The games involved various puck-shooting drills, such as into a washing machine and goal net targets. A rink was set up outdoors on Parliament Hill and teams of NHL alumni played an exhibition game.

A major junior game between the Ottawa 67's of the Ontario Hockey League (OHL) (who were celebrating their 50th anniversary; the team was established and named in honour of Canada's centennial) and the Gatineau Olympiques of the Quebec Major Junior Hockey League (QMJHL) was held on the rink on the following day, December 17, with the Olympiques winning 4–1. It marked the first outdoor Canadian Hockey League (CHL) interleague game, and the seventh CHL outdoor game overall.

== Television ==
The NHL 100 Classic was scheduled as the main 7 p.m. (Eastern Time) Hockey Night in Canada game, simulcast on both CBC Television and Sportsnet, as well as the French-language La super soirée LNH game on TVA Sports. NBCSN simulcast the HNIC feed in the United States.

== Game summary ==
December 16, 2017	Montreal Canadiens	0–3	Ottawa Senators	TD Place Stadium	Recap

Ottawa goalie Craig Anderson stopped all 28 Montreal shots, while Jean-Gabriel Pageau, Bobby Ryan and Nate Thompson each scored a goal. For the Canadiens, Carey Price made 35 saves in the loss. The temperature at the stadium was −15 °C (5 °F).

Scoring summary
Period	Team	Goal	Assist(s)	Time	Score
1st	No scoring plays				
2nd	OTT	Jean-Gabriel Pageau (4)	Erik Karlsson (19), Tom Pyatt (9)	14:55	1–0 OTT
3rd	OTT	Bobby Ryan (3)	Unassisted	17:02	2–0 OTT
3rd	OTT	Nate Thompson (4) – en	Mark Stone (14)	19:49	3–0 OTT

Number in parentheses represents the player's total in goals or assists to that point of the season

Penalty summary
Period	Team	Player	Penalty	Time	PIM
1st	MTL	Byron Froese	Slashing	16:09	2:00
2nd	MTL	Phillip Danault	High-sticking	00:21	2:00
3rd	MTL	Max Pacioretty	Tripping	00:32	2:00
3rd	OTT	Thomas Chabot	Holding	05:50	2:00

Shots by period
Team	1	2	3	Total
Montreal	8	8	12	28
Ottawa	14	15	9	38

Power play opportunities
Team	Goals/Opportunities
Montreal	0/1
Ottawa	0/3

Three star selections
	Team	Player	Statistics
1st	OTT	Erik Karlsson	1 assist
2nd	MTL	Carey Price	35 saves
3rd	OTT	Jean-Gabriel Pageau	1 goal

== Team rosters ==
Montreal Canadiens
#		Player	Position
6	(Canada)	Shea Weber	D
8	(Canada)	Jordie Benn	D
11	(Canada)	Brendan Gallagher (A)	RW
14	(Czech Republic)	Tomas Plekanec (A)	C
20	(Canada)	Nicolas Deslauriers	LW
21	(Canada)	David Schlemko	D
22	(Canada)	Karl Alzner	D
24	(Canada)	Phillip Danault	C
26	(United States)	Jeff Petry	D
27	(United States)	Alex Galchenyuk	LW
28	(Czech Republic)	Jakub Jerabek	D
31	(Canada)	Carey Price	G
37	(Finland)	Antti Niemi	G
41	(Canada)	Paul Byron	LW
42	(Canada)	Byron Froese	C
43	(Canada)	Daniel Carr	LW
54	(Canada)	Charles Hudon	LW
65	(Canada)	Andrew Shaw	C
67	(United States)	Max Pacioretty (C)	LW
92	(Canada)	Jonathan Drouin	C
Head coach: (Canada) Claude Julien

Ottawa Senators
#		Player	Position
1	(United States)	Mike Condon	G
2	(Canada)	Dion Phaneuf (A)	D
5	(Canada)	Cody Ceci	D
9	(United States)	Bobby Ryan	RW
10	(Canada)	Tom Pyatt	C
14	(Canada)	Alexandre Burrows	RW
15	(Canada)	Zack Smith	C
17	(United States)	Nate Thompson	C
18	(United States)	Ryan Dzingel	LW
19	(Canada)	Derick Brassard	C
29	(Sweden)	Johnny Oduya	D
33	(Sweden)	Fredrik Claesson	D
40	(Canada)	Gabriel Dumont	C
41	(United States)	Craig Anderson	G
44	(Canada)	Jean-Gabriel Pageau	C
61	(Canada)	Mark Stone (A)	RW
65	(Sweden)	Erik Karlsson (C)	D
68	(Canada)	Mike Hoffman	LW
72	(Canada)	Thomas Chabot	D
95	(Canada)	Matt Duchene	C
Head coach: (Canada) Guy Boucher

=== Scratches ===
- Montreal Canadiens: Jacob de la Rose, Joe Morrow
- Ottawa Senators: Nick Paul

=== Officials ===
- Referees – Brad Watson, Marc Joannette
- Linesmen – Steve Barton, Derek Nansen

== National anthem ==
The Canadian national anthem was sung by singer-songwriter Serena Ryder.

== See also ==
- NHL Heritage Classic
