= 2017–18 Ottawa Senators season =

Season of professional ice hockey team

2017–18 Ottawa Senators
- Division: 7th Atlantic
- Conference: 15th Eastern
- 2017–18 record: 28–43–11
- Home record: 16–19–6
- Road record: 12–24–5
- Goals for: 221
- Goals against: 291

Team information
- General manager: Pierre Dorion
- Coach: Guy Boucher
- Captain: Erik Karlsson
- Alternate captains: Dion Phaneuf (Oct.–Feb.); Zack Smith (Feb.–Apr.); Mark Stone; Kyle Turris (Oct.–Nov.)
- Arena: Canadian Tire Centre
- Average attendance: 15,829
- Minor league affiliate: Belleville Senators (AHL)

Team leaders
- Goals: Matt Duchene; Ryan Dzingel (23)
- Assists: Erik Karlsson (53)
- Points: Erik Karlsson; Mark Stone (62)
- Penalty minutes: Mark Borowiecki (64)
- Plus/minus: Mark Stone (+9)
- Wins: Craig Anderson (23)
- Goals against average: Mike Condon (3.25)

The 2017–18 Ottawa Senators season was the 26th season of the Ottawa Senators of the National Hockey League (NHL). The Senators failed to return to the Stanley Cup playoffs after advancing to game seven of the Eastern Conference Final in the 2017 playoffs.

== Team business ==
The team moved their American Hockey League (AHL) affiliate team, the Binghamton Senators, to Belleville, Ontario, becoming the Belleville Senators for the 2017–18 season. The AHL team plays in a refurbished Yardmen Arena, equipped with CA$20 million in upgrades.

The team completed some work on the Canadian Tire Centre in time for the season. The team reduced seating in the upper bowl while adding a stage and special event areas. Team president Tom Anselmi explained the changes in part as that the Centre had too many upper bowl seats and not enough lower bowl seating. The team and Senators fans had been criticized during the 2017 playoffs for not selling out every playoff game. The seating capacity was reduced to 17,000 (standing areas were retained). After the season, Eugene Melnyk stated that he thought the move was a mistake and the tarps over the seats in the upper bowl would be removed for next season.

In January 2018, the Senators reached an agreement with the National Capital Commission government agency in Ottawa to redevelop the downtown LeBreton Flats site. The site would be redeveloped for CA$3.5 billion in a partnership with private developers known as the Rendezvous Group and would include new residential buildings, a public square and tourist attractions. As part of the redevelopment, the Senators would build a new ice hockey arena to replace the Canadian Tire Centre, an arena considered by many fans to be remote and having access problems. A new arena is not expected to open before 2022.

In February 2018, team president Anselmi resigned his position with the Senators, without explanation. The same day, the Senators extended the contract of general manager Pierre Dorion by three years, given the task by owner Melnyk to rebuild the team as necessary.

A group of fans, disappointed in the team in general and owner Melnyk in particular, organized the "#MelnykOut" campaign to prod Melnyk into selling the team or otherwise not be involved with the team. Billboards promoting the "#MelnykOut" campaign were crowd-funded and located around Ottawa. Melnyk and Dorion held "town-hall" meetings with season ticket subscribers after the season in an effort to win back the fan base. The club announced a reduction in parking rates, concession incentives and the removal of the tarps from seats in the arena. Melnyk told the fans that the team was not for sale. Former captain Daniel Alfredsson later told former Ottawa Sun columnist Susan Sherring that he and Ottawa Mayor Jim Watson were in agreement that "it was time for a new owner." Asked about Alfredsson's comments, NHL Commissioner Gary Bettman stated that the club was not for sale, that Melnyk was "committed to the Senators and is passionate about them."

In May 2018, the club announced the appointment of Nicolas Ruszkowski as its new chief operating officer. Ruszkowski has a background in public relations. Ruszkowski will be in charge of business operations and will not have a role in hockey operations.

In June 2018, Melnyk negotiated a CA$135 million refinancing of a long-term loan on the franchise. At the same time, Melnyk had to comment on rumours that he had received an offer for the franchise and turned it down, stating that the team was not for sale and no negotiations had occurred.

== Off-season ==
On June 14, 2017, the Senators announced that long-time winger Chris Neil would not be re-signed and he became a free agent on July 1. Neil had played over 1,000 games for the Senators since being drafted by the team in 1998, accumulating 2,522 penalty minutes during this time, the 20th-most of any player in league history. Neil would not be signed by any other NHL team and he chose to retire. He was honoured by the Senators with a ceremony at the January 25, 2018, Senators' home game.

On July 1, 2017, former Senators team captain Daniel Alfredsson announced that he was stepping down in his role as senior advisor of hockey operations. He said that he wanted to take a complete break from the game to spend time with his family. Alfredsson held the role for two seasons.

The team had a significant turnover in personnel. Senators did not resign forwards Chris Kelly, Tommy Wingels or Viktor Stalberg, and lost Clarke MacArthur to long-term injury related to his ongoing issues with concussions. Defenceman Marc Methot was lost to the Vegas Golden Knights through the 2017 NHL expansion draft. Kelly would later join the Senators' Belleville affiliate. The Senators signed free agents Johnny Oduya and Nate Thompson.

== Pre-season ==
On June 16, 2017, the Senators announced their pre-season schedule. They played a six-game schedule starting September 18, including a home-and-home set against their provincial rivals, the Toronto Maple Leafs, and a game against the New Jersey Devils in O'Leary, Prince Edward Island, as part of Kraft Hockeyville on September 25. The team also played two games against their closest geographical rival, the Montreal Canadiens, and one game against the Winnipeg Jets.

== Regular season ==
The Senators' home opener was against the Washington Capitals on October 5. On November 10 and November 11, the Senators played two games against the Colorado Avalanche in Stockholm, Sweden. This marked the first time an NHL regular season game has been played outside of North America since 2011.

The Senators made a major trade on November 5, 2017. The team traded Kyle Turris, Andrew Hammond, Shane Bowers and draft picks to the Colorado Avalanche for Matt Duchene, who had requested a trade from the Avalanche. Turris was moved by the Avalanche to the Nashville Predators in a second phase of the deal. Turris had been in unsuccessful salary negotiations with the Senators and reportedly (probably not) turned down a contract offer from the Senators which was similar to one he accepted from the Predators. Hammond had been playing for the Senators' minor league Belleville team, and the Senators wanted to clear his contract. Hammond would remain with Belleville after the trade and was eventually elevated by the Avalanche. Bowers was the Senators' 2017 first round entry draft pick, playing in NCAA ice hockey.

To mark the NHL's centennial, the Senators hosted the "NHL 100 Classic" outdoor game on December 16 at TD Place Stadium in Ottawa. The game between Ottawa and the Montreal Canadiens comes nearly 100 years after the first game of the NHL's 1917–18 season, between the Ottawa Senators and the Montreal Canadiens. The regular season game was also a Canada 150 event. The stadium's capacity was increased with temporary stands, which were also used for the 105th Grey Cup game to be held a few weeks earlier. The Senators had hoped to host the event on Parliament Hill, but the Government of Canada decided it was not feasible. An alumni game was held at an NHL-sized rink installed on Parliament Hill. In the 100 Classic, the Senators defeated the Canadiens 3–0. The game was preceded by controversial comments by owner Eugene Melnyk about the team's attendance, the move to Lebreton Flats and a possible move of the team.

The Senators began the season without captain Erik Karlsson, who had had off-season surgery, and he returned late in October, at less than 100%, but the team managed to have a winning record in October. After the trade for Duchene, the Senators played the games against the Avalanche in Sweden, winning both. The rest of November was unkind, as the Senators then lost seven in a row, one in overtime. December was also a losing month, as the Senators had five-game and four-game losing streaks and won only one game of eight on the road. January saw the Senators lose six in a row, the first time the team had lost six in a row in regulation since 1996.

As the trade deadline of February 26 approached, the Senators were still well outside of a playoff spot. After having his contract extended, general manager Dorion went to work to rebuild the roster. The Senators traded Chris DiDomenico to the Chicago Blackhawks and Dion Phaneuf and Nate Thompson to the Los Angeles Kings. Derick Brassard went to the Pittsburgh Penguins in a three-team swap with the Vegas Golden Knights. Defenceman Johnny Oduya went to the Philadelphia Flyers via waivers. The Senators notified other teams that they would consider offers for team captain Erik Karlsson, and also suggested a package including Bobby Ryan, but neither player was traded. GM Dorion later stated he would not trade Karlsson at the 2018 NHL Entry Draft and would offer him an eight-year extension on his contract on July 1, 2018, the first day the team is allowed to do so.

== Playoffs ==
The Senators were eliminated from playoff contention on March 22, 2018.

== Standings ==
Atlantic Division
Pos	Team	GP	W	L	OTL	ROW	GF	GA	GD	Pts
1	z – Tampa Bay Lightning	82	54	23	5	48	296	236	+60	113
2	x – Boston Bruins	82	50	20	12	47	270	214	+56	112
3	x – Toronto Maple Leafs	82	49	26	7	42	277	232	+45	105
4	Florida Panthers	82	44	30	8	41	248	246	+2	96
5	Detroit Red Wings	82	30	39	13	25	217	255	−38	73
6	Montreal Canadiens	82	29	40	13	27	209	264	−55	71
7	Ottawa Senators	82	28	43	11	26	221	291	−70	67
8	Buffalo Sabres	82	25	45	12	24	199	280	−81	62

Source: National Hockey League
x – Clinched playoff spot; z – Clinched conference

Eastern Conference Wild Card
Pos	Div	Team	GP	W	L	OTL	ROW	GF	GA	GD	Pts
1	ME	x – Columbus Blue Jackets	82	45	30	7	39	242	230	+12	97
2	ME	x – New Jersey Devils	82	44	29	9	39	248	244	+4	97
3	AT	Florida Panthers	82	44	30	8	41	248	246	+2	96
4	ME	Carolina Hurricanes	82	36	35	11	33	228	256	−28	83
5	ME	New York Islanders	82	35	37	10	32	264	296	−32	80
6	ME	New York Rangers	82	34	39	9	31	231	268	−37	77
7	AT	Detroit Red Wings	82	30	39	13	25	217	255	−38	73
8	AT	Montreal Canadiens	82	29	40	13	27	209	264	−55	71
9	AT	Ottawa Senators	82	28	43	11	26	221	291	−70	67
10	AT	Buffalo Sabres	82	25	45	12	24	199	280	−81	62

Source: National Hockey League
x – Clinched playoff spot

== Schedule and results ==
=== Pre-season ===
The pre-season schedule was announced on June 16, 2017.

2017 pre-season game log: 3–3–0 (Home: 2–1–0; Road: 1–2–0)
#	Date	Visitor	Score	Home	OT	Decision	Attendance	Record	Recap
1	September 18	Toronto	2–6	Ottawa		Anderson	14,931	1–0–0
2	September 19	Ottawa	5–2	Toronto		Condon	18,847	2–0–0
3	September 23	Montreal	1–5	Ottawa		Anderson	14,818	3–0–0
4^{[a]}	September 25	New Jersey	8–1	Ottawa		Condon	–	3–1–0
5	September 27	Ottawa	3–5	Winnipeg		Condon	15,294	3–2–0
6	September 30	Ottawa	2–9	Montreal		Anderson	21,288	3–3–0
Notes:^{a} Game was played at Consolidated Credit Union Place in Summerside, Prince Edward Island.

=== Regular season ===
The regular season schedule was released on June 22, 2017.

2017–18 game log (Record: 28–43–11; Home: 16–19–6; Road: 12–24–5)

October: 5–2–5 (Home: 2–2–4; Road: 3–0–1)
#	Date	Visitor	Score	Home	OT	Decision	Attendance	Record	Pts	Recap
1	October 5	Washington	5–4	Ottawa	SO	Anderson	17,009	0–0–1	1
2	October 7	Detroit	2–1	Ottawa	SO	Anderson	14,883	0–0–2	2
3	October 10	Ottawa	3–2	Vancouver	SO	Anderson	17,273	1–0–2	4
4	October 13	Ottawa	6–0	Calgary		Anderson	19,289	2–0–2	6
5	October 14	Ottawa	6–1	Edmonton		Condon	18,347	3–0–2	8
6	October 17	Vancouver	3–0	Ottawa		Anderson	13,430	3–1–2	8
7	October 19	New Jersey	5–4	Ottawa	OT	Anderson	13,364	3–1–3	9
8	October 21	Toronto	3–6	Ottawa		Anderson	17,455	4–1–3	11
9	October 24	Los Angeles	3–2	Ottawa	SO	Condon	14,034	4–1–4	12
10	October 26	Philadelphia	4–5	Ottawa		Anderson	14,926	5–1–4	14
11	October 27	Ottawa	4–5	New Jersey	SO	Condon	13,763	5–1–5	15
12	October 30	Montreal	8–3	Ottawa		Anderson	15,069	5–2–5	15

November: 3–7–1 (Home: 2–3–1; Road: 1–4–0)
#	Date	Visitor	Score	Home	OT	Decision	Attendance	Record	Pts	Recap
13	November 2	Detroit	1–3	Ottawa		Anderson	14,724	6–2–5	17
14	November 4	Vegas	5–4	Ottawa		Anderson	16,824	6–3–5	17
15	November 10	Ottawa	4–3	Colorado*	OT	Anderson	13,396	7–3–5	19
16	November 11	Colorado	3–4	Ottawa*		Anderson	13,396	8–3–5	21
17	November 16	Pittsburgh	3–1	Ottawa		Anderson	17,144	8–4–5	21
18	November 18	Arizona	3–2	Ottawa	OT	Condon	16,471	8–4–6	22
19	November 19	Ottawa	0–3	NY Rangers		Anderson	17,524	8–5–6	22
20	November 22	Ottawa	2–5	Washington		Anderson	18,506	8–6–6	22
21	November 24	Ottawa	2–5	Columbus		Anderson	17,084	8–7–6	22
22	November 25	NY Islanders	2–1	Ottawa		Anderson	17,276	8–8–6	22
23	November 29	Ottawa	1–2	Montreal		Condon	21,302	8–9–6	22

December: 4–8–2 (Home: 3–2–0; Road: 1–6–2)
#	Date	Visitor	Score	Home	OT	Decision	Attendance	Record	Pts	Recap
24	December 1	Ottawa	6–5	NY Islanders		Condon	11,797	9–9–6	24
25	December 3	Ottawa	0–5	Winnipeg		Condon	15,321	9–10–6	24
26	December 6	Ottawa	0–3	Anaheim		Anderson	15,890	9–11–6	24
27	December 7	Ottawa	3–4	Los Angeles	OT	Condon	18,230	9–11–7	25
28	December 9	Ottawa	0–5	San Jose		Anderson	17,562	9–12–7	25
29	December 12	Ottawa	2–3	Buffalo		Condon	17,454	9–13–7	25
30	December 13	NY Rangers	2–3	Ottawa		Anderson	13,212	10–13–7	27
31	December 16	Montreal	0–3	Ottawa		Anderson	33,959 (outdoors)	11–13–7	29
32	December 19	Minnesota	6–4	Ottawa		Anderson	13,804	11–14–7	29
33	December 21	Ottawa	3–4	Tampa Bay	SO	Anderson	19,092	11–14–8	30
34	December 23	Ottawa	0–1	Florida		Condon	13,694	11–15–8	30
35	December 27	Ottawa	1–5	Boston		Anderson	17,565	11–16–8	30
36	December 29	Columbus	4–5	Ottawa		Condon	17,031	12–16–8	32
37	December 30	Boston	5–0	Ottawa		Condon	17,579	12–17–8	32

January: 3–7–1 (Home: 2–4–0; Road: 1–3–1)
#	Date	Visitor	Score	Home	OT	Decision	Attendance	Record	Pts	Recap
38	January 3	Ottawa	1–2	Detroit	OT	Anderson	19,515	12–17–9	33
39	January 5	San Jose	5–6	Ottawa	OT	Anderson	16,061	13–17–9	35
40	January 6	Tampa Bay	3–6	Ottawa		Anderson	16,247	14–17–9	37
41	January 9	Chicago	8–2	Ottawa		Anderson	14,007	14–18–9	37
42	January 10	Ottawa	4–3	Toronto		Anderson	19,117	15–18–9	39
43	January 18	St. Louis	4–1	Ottawa		Anderson	14,002	15–19–9	39
44	January 20	Toronto	4–3	Ottawa		Anderson	17,768	15–20–9	39
45	January 22	Ottawa	1–3	Minnesota		Condon	18,907	15–21–9	39
46	January 23	Ottawa	0–3	St. Louis		Anderson	18,505	15–22–9	39
47	January 25	Boston	3–2	Ottawa		Condon	15,232	15–23–9	39
48	January 30	Ottawa	1–2	Carolina		Anderson	11,448	15–24–9	39

February: 6–7–1 (Home: 5–2–0; Road: 1–5–1)
#	Date	Visitor	Score	Home	OT	Decision	Attendance	Record	Pts	Recap
49	February 1	Anaheim	1–2	Ottawa	OT	Condon	13,759	16–24–9	41
50	February 3	Ottawa	4–3	Philadelphia	SO	Anderson	19,729	17–24–9	43
51	February 4	Ottawa	1–4	Montreal		Condon	21,302	17–25–9	43
52	February 6	New Jersey	3–5	Ottawa		Anderson	13,991	18–25–9	45
53	February 8	Nashville	3–4	Ottawa	OT	Anderson	14,632	19–25–9	47
54	February 10	Ottawa	3–6	Toronto		Condon	19,477	19–26–9	47
55	February 13	Ottawa	3–6	Pittsburgh		Condon	18,448	19–27–9	47
56	February 15	Buffalo	2–3	Ottawa	OT	Anderson	13,371	20–27–9	49
57	February 17	NY Rangers	3–6	Ottawa		Anderson	17,259	21–27–9	51
58	February 19	Ottawa	2–5	Nashville		Anderson	17,177	21–28–9	51
59	February 21	Ottawa	2–3	Chicago	SO	Condon	21,532	21–28–10	52
60	February 22	Tampa Bay	4–3	Ottawa		Anderson	16,204	21–29–10	52
61	February 24	Philadelphia	5–3	Ottawa		Anderson	16,128	21–30–10	52
62	February 27	Ottawa	2–3	Washington		Condon	18,506	21–31–10	52

March: 6–9–1 (Home: 2–5–1; Road: 4–4–0)
#	Date	Visitor	Score	Home	OT	Decision	Attendance	Record	Pts	Recap
63	March 2	Ottawa	5–4	Vegas		Anderson	18,269	22–31–10	54
64	March 3	Ottawa	1–2	Arizona		Condon	10,955	22–32–10	54
65	March 5	Ottawa	3–2	Dallas	OT	Anderson	17,110	23–32–10	56
66	March 8	Buffalo	4–3	Ottawa	SO	Anderson	13,377	23–32–11	57
67	March 9	Calgary	2–1	Ottawa		Condon	14,498	23–33–11	57
68	March 12	Ottawa	5–3	Florida		Anderson	11,585	24–33–11	59
69	March 13	Ottawa	7–4	Tampa Bay		Condon	19,092	25–33–11	61
70	March 16	Dallas	2–3	Ottawa	OT	Anderson	15,842	26–33–11	63
71	March 17	Ottawa	1–2	Columbus		Condon	17,612	26–34–11	63
72	March 20	Florida	7–2	Ottawa		Anderson	14,434	26–35–11	63
73	March 22	Edmonton	6–2	Ottawa		Anderson	16,538	26–36–11	63
74	March 24	Carolina	5–2	Ottawa		Condon	16,555	26–37–11	63
75	March 26	Ottawa	1–4	Carolina		Anderson	10,817	26–38–11	63
76	March 27	NY Islanders	4–3	Ottawa		Condon	15,284	26–39–11	63
77	March 29	Florida	2–3	Ottawa	OT	Anderson	15,095	27–39–11	65
78	March 31	Ottawa	0–2	Detroit		Condon	19,515	27–40–11	65

April: 1–3–0 (Home: 0–1–0; Road: 1–2–0)
#	Date	Visitor	Score	Home	OT	Decision	Attendance	Record	Pts	Recap
79	April 2	Winnipeg	6–5	Ottawa		Anderson	17,122	27–41–11	65
80	April 4	Ottawa	4–2	Buffalo		Anderson	18,919	28–41–11	67
81	April 6	Ottawa	0–4	Pittsburgh		Anderson	18,633	28–42–11	67
82	April 7	Ottawa	2–5	Boston		Taylor	17,565	28–43–11	67

Legend: Win (2 points) Loss (0 points) Overtime/shootout loss (1 point)

== Players ==
=== Statistics ===
Final Stats

Skaters

Regular season
Player	GP	G	A	Pts	+/−	PIM
Mark Stone	58	20	42	**62**	**9**	10
Erik Karlsson	71	9	**53**	**62**	−25	36
Mike Hoffman	**82**	22	34	56	−20	32
Matt Duchene†	68	**23**	26	49	−23	14
Ryan Dzingel	79	**23**	18	41	−17	35
Derick Brassard‡	58	18	20	38	−1	30
Bobby Ryan	62	11	22	33	−12	14
Jean-Gabriel Pageau	78	14	15	29	−14	36
Thomas Chabot	63	9	16	25	−12	14
Tom Pyatt	81	7	15	22	−12	10
Cody Ceci	**82**	5	14	19	−27	12
Zack Smith	68	5	14	19	−32	54
Dion Phaneuf‡	53	3	13	16	−8	34
Alex Burrows	71	6	8	14	−8	59
Nate Thompson‡	43	4	7	11	0	10
Mark Borowiecki	52	3	8	11	−6	**64**
Chris DiDomenico‡	24	6	4	10	−4	8
Kyle Turris‡	11	3	6	9	−3	2
Magnus Paajarvi†	35	6	2	8	−8	4
Johnny Oduya‡	51	4	4	8	2	32
Chris Wideman	16	3	5	8	5	6
Marian Gaborik†	16	4	3	7	−7	6
Fredrik Claesson	64	1	6	7	−7	35
Colin White	21	2	4	6	1	8
Max McCormick	30	3	2	5	−5	37
Filip Chlapík	20	1	3	4	−5	4
Christian Wolanin	10	1	2	3	−4	0
Gabriel Dumont‡	23	1	1	2	1	2
Nick Paul	11	1	0	1	−4	0
Patrick Sieloff	1	1	0	1	−2	0
Ben Harpur	41	0	1	1	−21	21
Jim O'Brien	10	0	1	1	−1	0
Nick Shore‡	6	0	1	1	1	0
Erik Burgdoerfer	2	0	1	1	2	0
Logan Brown	4	0	1	1	0	0
Andreas Englund	1	0	0	0	1	0
Jack Rodewald	4	0	0	0	−1	2
Alex Formenton	1	0	0	0	0	0
Ben Sexton	2	0	0	0	−1	0
Mike Blunden	1	0	0	0	0	0
Christian Jaros	2	0	0	0	0	0

Goaltenders

Regular season
Player	GP	GS	TOI	W	L	OT	GA	GAA	SA	SV%	SO	G	A	PIM
Craig Anderson	**58**	**55**	**3,250:32**	**23**	**25**	**6**	**180**	3.32	**1,768**	.898	**2**	0	0	**2**
Mike Condon	31	26	1,625:55	5	17	5	88	**3.25**	898	**.902**	0	0	**2**	0
Danny Taylor	1	1	58:29	0	1	0	4	4.10	34	.882	0	0	0	0

^{†}Denotes player spent time with another team before joining the Senators. Stats reflect time with the Senators only.
^{‡}No longer with team.
Bold denotes team leader in that category.

=== Awards ===
Regular season
Player	Award	Awarded
Jean-Gabriel Pageau	NHL Third Star of the Week	October 30, 2017

=== Milestones ===
Player	Milestone	Date
Logan Brown	1st career NHL game	October 5, 2017
Alex Formenton	1st career NHL game	October 7, 2017
Christian Jaros	1st career NHL game	October 10, 2017
Thomas Chabot	1st career NHL assist 1st career NHL point	October 13, 2017
Johnny Oduya	800th career NHL game	October 14, 2017
Alex Burrows	200th career NHL goal	October 19, 2017
Logan Brown	1st career NHL assist 1st career NHL point	October 21, 2017
Filip Chlapik	1st career NHL game 1st career NHL assist 1st career NHL point	October 26, 2017
Chris DiDomenico	1st career NHL assist 1st career NHL point	October 26, 2017
Jack Rodewald	1st career NHL game	October 27, 2017
Chris DiDomenico	1st career NHL goal	October 27, 2017
Mike Condon	100th career NHL game	October 30, 2017
Mark Stone	200th career NHL point	November 2, 2017
Alex Burrows	400th career NHL point	November 4, 2017
Cody Ceci	300th career NHL game	November 11, 2017
Mike Hoffman	100th career NHL assist	November 25, 2017
Thomas Chabot	1st career NHL goal	December 1, 2017
Matt Duchene	600th career NHL game	December 9, 2017
Derick Brassard	400th career NHL point	December 12, 2017
Mike Hoffman	200th career NHL point	January 5, 2018
Bobby Ryan	700th career NHL game	January 6, 2018
Zack Smith	500th career NHL game	January 6, 2018
Mike Hoffman	300th career NHL game	January 6, 2018
Alex Burrows	200th career NHL assist	January 10, 2018
Erik Karlsson	600th career NHL game	February 1, 2018
Colin White	1st career NHL assist 1st career NHL point	February 3, 2018
Colin White	1st career NHL goal	February 6, 2018
Jean-Gabriel Pageau	300th career NHL game	February 8, 2018
Mike Hoffman	100th career NHL goal	February 8, 2018
Derick Brassard	700th career NHL game	February 19, 2018
Mark Stone	300th career NHL game	February 22, 2018
Erik Karlsson	500th career NHL point	February 27, 2018
Magnus Paajarvi	100th career NHL point	March 8, 2018
Fredrik Claesson	100th career NHL game	March 12, 2018
Alex Burrows	900th career NHL game	March 13, 2018
Erik Burgdoerfer	1st career NHL assist 1st career NHL point	March 13, 2018
Christian Wolanin	1st career NHL game	March 22, 2018
Bobby Ryan	500th career NHL point	March 22, 2018
Filip Chlapik	1st career NHL goal	March 22, 2018
Tom Pyatt	400th career NHL game	March 24, 2018
Ben Sexton	1st career NHL game	March 26, 2018
Christian Wolanin	1st career NHL goal 1st career NHL point	April 2, 2018
Matt Duchene	200th career NHL goal	April 2, 2018

== Transactions ==
=== Trades ===
Date	Details		Ref
November 5, 2017	To Colorado Avalanche Kyle Turris; Shane Bowers; Andrew Hammond; Conditional 1st-round pick in 2018 or 2019; 3rd-round pick in 2019	To Ottawa Senators Matt Duchene
February 13, 2018	To Los Angeles Kings Dion Phaneuf; Nate Thompson	To Ottawa Senators Marian Gaborik; Nick Shore
February 15, 2018	To Chicago Blackhawks Chris DiDomenico	To Ottawa Senators Ville Pokka
February 23, 2018	To Vegas Golden Knights Derick Brassard	To Ottawa Senators PIT 3rd-round pick in 2019
February 23, 2018	To Pittsburgh Penguins Vincent Dunn; 3rd-round pick in 2018	To Ottawa Senators Ian Cole; Filip Gustavsson; 1st-round pick in 2018
February 26, 2018	To Columbus Blue Jackets Ian Cole	To Ottawa Senators Nick Moutrey; 3rd-round pick in 2020
February 26, 2018	To Calgary Flames Nick Shore	To Ottawa Senators 7th-round pick in 2019
June 19, 2018	To San Jose Sharks Mike Hoffman; Cody Donaghey; 5th-round pick 2020	To Ottawa Senators Mikkel Boedker; Julius Bergman; 6th-round pick 2020

=== Free agents acquired ===
Date	Player	Former team	Contract terms (in U.S. dollars)	Ref
July 1, 2017	Nate Thompson	Anaheim Ducks	2-year, $3.3 million	
July 1, 2017	Tyler Randell	Providence Bruins (AHL)	1-year, $700,000 two-way	
July 1, 2017	Ben Sexton	Albany Devils (AHL)	2-year, $1.45 million two-way	
July 1, 2017	Max Reinhart	Kolner Haie (DEL)	1-year, $650,000 two-way	
July 1, 2017	Erik Burgdoerfer	Rochester Americans (AHL)	2-year, $1.3 million two-way	
July 1, 2017	Danny Taylor	Sibir Novosibirsk (KHL)	1-year, $850,000 two-way	
July 24, 2017	Johnny Oduya	Chicago Blackhawks	1-year, $1 million	
September 19, 2017	Parker Kelly	Prince Albert Raiders (WHL)	3-year, $2.24 million entry-level contract	
October 24, 2017	Jack Rodewald	Belleville Senators (AHL)	2-year, $1.415 million entry-level contract	
December 26, 2017	Aaron Luchuk	Barrie Colts (OHL)	3-year, $2.775 million entry-level contract	
February 25, 2018	Jim O'Brien	Belleville Senators (AHL)	2-year contract, $1.3 million two-way	
March 28, 2018	Andrew Sturtz	Pennsylvania State University (Big Ten)	2-year, $1.85 million entry-level contract	

=== Free agents lost ===
Date	Player	New team	Contract terms (in U.S. dollars)	Ref
July 1, 2017	Tommy Wingels	Chicago Blackhawks	1-year, $750,000	
July 1, 2017	Matt O'Connor	Nashville Predators	1-year, $650,000	
July 1, 2017	Phil Varone	Philadelphia Flyers	2-year, $1.3 million	
July 11, 2017	Viktor Stalberg	EV Zug (NLA)	2-year	
July 11, 2017	Ryan Rupert	Indy Fuel (ECHL)	1-year	
October 2, 2017	Casey Bailey	Bridgeport Sound Tigers (AHL)	1-year	
April 26, 2018	Danny Taylor	Sibir Novosibirsk (KHL)	Unknown	
May 8, 2018	Ville Pokka	Avangard Omsk (KHL)	1-year	

|}

=== Claimed via waivers ===
Player	Previous team	Date	Ref
Gabriel Dumont	Tampa Bay Lightning	November 22, 2017	
Chris DiDomenico	Tampa Bay Lightning	December 1, 2017	
Magnus Paajarvi	St. Louis Blues	January 26, 2018	

=== Lost via waivers ===
Player	New team	Date	Ref
Chris DiDomenico	Tampa Bay Lightning	November 24, 2017	
Gabriel Dumont	Tampa Bay Lightning	February 21, 2018	
Johnny Oduya	Philadelphia Flyers	February 26, 2018	

=== Player signings ===
Date	Player	Contract terms (in U.S. dollars)	Ref
June 26, 2017	Tom Pyatt	2-year, $2.2 million	
June 27, 2017	Max McCormick	2-year, $1.3 million	
June 28, 2017	Mike Condon	3-year, $7.2 million	
July 5, 2017	Chris Driedger	1-year, $735,000 two-way	
July 11, 2017	Patrick Sieloff	1-year, $650,000 two-way	
July 17, 2017	Jean-Gabriel Pageau	3-year, $9.3 million	
July 21, 2017	Ryan Dzingel	2-year, $3.6 million	
September 29, 2017	Craig Anderson	2-year, $9.5 million contract extension	
October 2, 2017	Alex Formenton	3-year, $2.775 million entry-level contract	
October 3, 2017	Drake Batherson	3-year, $2.4 million entry-level contract	
October 5, 2017	Mark Borowiecki	2-year, $2.4 million contract extension	
February 9, 2018	Ben Harpur	2-year, $1.45 million contract extension	
March 21, 2018	Christian Wolanin	2-year, $1.85 million entry-level contract	
May 22, 2018	Patrick Sieloff	2-year, $1.4 million two-way contract extension	
May 30, 2018	Magnus Paajarvi	1-year, $900,000 contract extension	

=== Suspensions/fines ===
Suspensions/fines
Player	Reason	Length	Salary	Date issued
Fredrik Claesson	Illegal check to the head of Boston Bruins forward Noel Acciari during NHL game no. 558 in Boston on December 27.	2 games	$6,989.24	December 28, 2017
Alex Burrows	Illegal knee to the head of New Jersey Devils forward Taylor Hall during NHL game no. 816 in Ottawa on February 6, 2018.	10 games	$134,408.60	February 7, 2018

== Draft picks ==
The Senators participated in the 2017 NHL entry draft, which was held on June 23–24, 2017 at the United Center in Chicago, Illinois.

Round	Overall	Player	Position	Nationality	Club team
1	28	Shane Bowers	Centre	Canada	Waterloo Black Hawks (USHL)
2	47^{1}	Alex Formenton	Left wing	Canada	London Knights (OHL)
4	121	Drake Batherson	Centre	Canada	Cape Breton Screaming Eagles (QMJHL)
6	183	Jordan Hollett	Goalie	Canada	Medicine Hat Tigers (WHL)

Draft notes:

1. The Calgary Flames' second-round pick went to the Ottawa Senators as the result of a trade on March 1, 2017 that sent Curtis Lazar and Mike Kostka to Calgary in exchange for Jyrki Jokipakka and this pick.

== Notes ==
1.The Senators did not play in the 2004–05 season due to the lockout.
