= 2017–18 Montreal Canadiens season =

NHL hockey team season

2017–18 Montreal Canadiens
- Division: 6th Atlantic
- Conference: 14th Eastern
- 2017–18 record: 29–40–13
- Home record: 18–14–9
- Road record: 11–26–4
- Goals for: 209
- Goals against: 264

Team information
- General manager: Marc Bergevin
- Coach: Claude Julien
- Captain: Max Pacioretty
- Alternate captains: Brendan Gallagher; Tomas Plekanec (Oct.–Feb.); Shea Weber
- Arena: Bell Centre
- Average attendance: 21,299
- Minor league affiliates: Laval Rocket (AHL); Brampton Beast (ECHL)

Team leaders
- Goals: Brendan Gallagher (31)
- Assists: Jonathan Drouin (33)
- Points: Brendan Gallagher (54)
- Penalty minutes: Nicolas Deslauriers (55)
- Plus/minus: Nicolas Deslauriers (+7)
- Wins: Carey Price (16)
- Goals against average: Antti Niemi (2.46)

The 2017–18 Montreal Canadiens season was the 109th season for the franchise that was founded on December 4, 1909, and their 101st in the National Hockey League (NHL). For the second time in the past three seasons, the Canadiens failed to make the playoffs for the first time since the 2015–16 season.

== Standings ==
Atlantic Division
Pos	Team	GP	W	L	OTL	ROW	GF	GA	GD	Pts
1	z – Tampa Bay Lightning	82	54	23	5	48	296	236	+60	113
2	x – Boston Bruins	82	50	20	12	47	270	214	+56	112
3	x – Toronto Maple Leafs	82	49	26	7	42	277	232	+45	105
4	Florida Panthers	82	44	30	8	41	248	246	+2	96
5	Detroit Red Wings	82	30	39	13	25	217	255	−38	73
6	Montreal Canadiens	82	29	40	13	27	209	264	−55	71
7	Ottawa Senators	82	28	43	11	26	221	291	−70	67
8	Buffalo Sabres	82	25	45	12	24	199	280	−81	62

Source: National Hockey League
x – Clinched playoff spot; z – Clinched conference

Eastern Conference Wild Card
Pos	Div	Team	GP	W	L	OTL	ROW	GF	GA	GD	Pts
1	ME	x – Columbus Blue Jackets	82	45	30	7	39	242	230	+12	97
2	ME	x – New Jersey Devils	82	44	29	9	39	248	244	+4	97
3	AT	Florida Panthers	82	44	30	8	41	248	246	+2	96
4	ME	Carolina Hurricanes	82	36	35	11	33	228	256	−28	83
5	ME	New York Islanders	82	35	37	10	32	264	296	−32	80
6	ME	New York Rangers	82	34	39	9	31	231	268	−37	77
7	AT	Detroit Red Wings	82	30	39	13	25	217	255	−38	73
8	AT	Montreal Canadiens	82	29	40	13	27	209	264	−55	71
9	AT	Ottawa Senators	82	28	43	11	26	221	291	−70	67
10	AT	Buffalo Sabres	82	25	45	12	24	199	280	−81	62

Source: National Hockey League
x – Clinched playoff spot

== Schedule and results ==
=== Preseason ===
The preseason schedule was released on June 19, 2017.

2017 preseason game log: 2–6–0 (Home: 2–3–0; Road: 0–3–0)
#	Date	Visitor	Score	Home	OT	Decision	Attendance	Record	Recap
1^{[a]}	September 18	Montreal	2–3	Boston		Fucale		0–1–0	Recap
2	September 20	Washington	4–2	Montreal		Lindgren	21,288	0–2–0	Recap
3	September 21	New Jersey	4–1	Montreal		Price	21,288	0–3–0	Recap
4	September 23	Montreal	1–5	Ottawa		Montoya	14,818	0–4–0	Recap
5^{[b]}	September 25	Montreal	1–5	Toronto		Montoya	–	0–5–0	Recap
6^{[a]}	September 27	Toronto	4–2	Montreal		Price	–	0–6–0	Recap
7	September 29	Florida	1–3	Montreal		Lindgren	21,288	1–6–0	Recap
8	September 30	Ottawa	2–9	Montreal		Price	21,288	2–6–0	Recap
Notes:^{a} Game was played at Videotron Centre in Quebec City, Quebec.^{b} Game was played at Ricoh Coliseum in Toronto, Ontario.

=== Regular season ===
The regular season schedule was published on June 22, 2017.

2017–18 game log

October: 4–7–1 (Home: 2–2–1; Road: 2–5–0)
#	Date	Visitor	Score	Home	OT	Decision	Attendance	Record	Pts	Recap
1	October 5	Montreal	3–2	Buffalo	SO	Price	19,070	1–0–0	2	Recap
2	October 7	Montreal	1–6	Washington		Price	18,506	1–1–0	2	Recap
3	October 8	Montreal	0–2	NY Rangers		Price	18,006	1–2–0	2	Recap
4	October 10	Chicago	3–1	Montreal		Price	21,302	1–3–0	2	Recap
5	October 14	Toronto	4–3	Montreal	OT	Price	21,302	1–3–1	3	Recap
6	October 17	Montreal	2–5	San Jose		Price	17,377	1–4–1	3	Recap
7	October 18	Montreal	1–5	Los Angeles		Montoya	18,230	1–5–1	3	Recap
8	October 20	Montreal	2–6	Anaheim		Price	17,174	1–6–1	3	Recap
9	October 24	Florida	1–5	Montreal		Price	21,302	2–6–1	5	Recap
10	October 26	Los Angeles	4–0	Montreal		Price	21,302	2–7–1	5	Recap
11	October 28	NY Rangers	4–5	Montreal		Price	21,302	3–7–1	7	Recap
12	October 30	Montreal	8–3	Ottawa		Montoya	15,069	4–7–1	9	Recap

November: 8–5–2 (Home: 5–3–1; Road: 3–2–1)
#	Date	Visitor	Score	Home	OT	Decision	Attendance	Record	Pts	Recap
13	November 2	Montreal	3–6	Minnesota		Price	18,924	4–8–1	9	Recap
14	November 4	Montreal	5–4	Winnipeg	OT	Montoya	15,321	5–8–1	11	Recap
15	November 5	Montreal	2–0	Chicago		Lindgren	21,871	6–8–1	13	Recap
16	November 7	Vegas	2–3	Montreal		Lindgren	21,302	7–8–1	15	Recap
17	November 9	Minnesota	3–0	Montreal		Lindgren	21,302	7–9–1	15	Recap
18	November 11	Buffalo	1–2	Montreal	OT	Lindgren	21,302	8–9–1	17	Recap
19	November 14	Columbus	2–1	Montreal	OT	Lindgren	21,302	8–9–2	18	Recap
20	November 16	Arizona	5–4	Montreal		Lindgren	21,302	8–10–2	18	Recap
21	November 18	Toronto	6–0	Montreal		Lindgren	21,302	8–11–2	18	Recap
22	November 21	Montreal	1–3	Dallas		Lindgren	18,532	8–12–2	18	Recap
23	November 22	Montreal	2–3	Nashville	SO	Niemi	17,113	8–12–3	19	Recap
24	November 25	Buffalo	0–3	Montreal		Price	21,302	9–12–3	21	Recap
25	November 27	Columbus	1–3	Montreal		Price	21,302	10–12–3	23	Recap
26	November 29	Ottawa	1–2	Montreal		Price	21,302	11–12–3	25	Recap
27	November 30	Montreal	6–3	Detroit		Price	19,515	12–12–3	27	Recap

December: 4–7–1 (Home: 2–2–1; Road: 2–5–0)
#	Date	Visitor	Score	Home	OT	Decision	Attendance	Record	Pts	Recap
28	December 2	Detroit	1–10	Montreal		Price	21,302	13–12–3	29	Recap
29	December 5	St. Louis	4–3	Montreal		Price	21,302	13–13–3	29	Recap
30	December 7	Calgary	3–2	Montreal	OT	Price	21,302	13–13–4	30	Recap
31	December 9	Edmonton	6–2	Montreal		Price	21,302	13–14–4	30	Recap
32	December 14	New Jersey	1–2	Montreal	OT	Price	21,302	14–14–4	32	Recap
33	December 16	Montreal	0–3	Ottawa		Price	33,959 (outdoors)	14–15–4	32	Recap
34	December 19	Montreal	7–5	Vancouver		Price	18,865	15–15–4	34	Recap
35	December 22	Montreal	3–2	Calgary		Price	19,289	16–15–4	36	Recap
36	December 23	Montreal	1–4	Edmonton		Niemi	18,347	16–16–4	36	Recap
37	December 27	Montreal	1–3	Carolina		Price	14,880	16–17–4	36	Recap
38	December 28	Montreal	1–3	Tampa Bay		Price	19,092	16–18–4	36	Recap
39	December 30	Montreal	0–2	Florida		Price	18,013	16–19–4	36	Recap

January: 4–5–2 (Home: 3–3–2; Road: 1–2–0)
#	Date	Visitor	Score	Home	OT	Decision	Attendance	Record	Pts	Recap
40	January 2	San Jose	4–1	Montreal		Price	21,302	16–20–4	36	Recap
41	January 4	Tampa Bay	1–2	Montreal	SO	Price	21,302	17–20–4	38	Recap
42	January 7	Vancouver	2–5	Montreal		Price	21,302	18–20–4	40	Recap
43	January 13	Boston	4–3	Montreal	SO	Price	21,302	18–20–5	41	Recap
44	January 15	NY Islanders	5–4	Montreal	OT	Price	21,302	18–20–6	42	Recap
45	January 17	Montreal	1–4	Boston		Price	17,565	18–21–6	42	Recap
46	January 19	Montreal	3–2	Washington		Niemi	18,506	19–21–6	44	Recap
47	January 20	Boston	4–1	Montreal		Price	21,302	19–22–6	44	Recap
48	January 23	Colorado	2–4	Montreal		Price	21,302	20–22–6	46	Recap
49	January 25	Carolina	6–5	Montreal		Price	21,302	20–23–6	46	Recap
50	January 30	Montreal	1–3	St. Louis		Price	18,149	20–24–6	46	Recap

February: 4–5–4 (Home: 4–0–3; Road: 0–5–1)
#	Date	Visitor	Score	Home	OT	Decision	Attendance	Record	Pts	Recap
51	February 1	Montreal	0–2	Carolina		Price	11,953	20–25–6	46	Recap
52	February 3	Anaheim	2–5	Montreal		Niemi	21,302	21–25–6	48	Recap
53	February 4	Ottawa	1–4	Montreal		Price	21,302	22–25–6	50	Recap
54	February 8	Montreal	3–5	Philadelphia		Price	19,655	22–26–6	50	Recap
55	February 10	Nashville	3–2	Montreal	SO	Price	21,302	22–26–7	51	Recap
56	February 14	Montreal	0–2	Colorado		Niemi	14,928	22–27–7	51	Recap
57	February 15	Montreal	2–5	Arizona		Price	11,489	22–28–7	51	Recap
58	February 17	Montreal	3–6	Vegas		Price	18,122	22–29–7	51	Recap
59	February 20	Montreal	2–3	Philadelphia	OT	Price	19,336	22–29–8	52	Recap
60	February 22	NY Rangers	1–3	Montreal		Niemi	21,302	23–29–8	54	Recap
61	February 24	Tampa Bay	4–3	Montreal	SO	Niemi	21,302	23–29–9	55	Recap
62	February 26	Philadelphia	1–0	Montreal	SO	Lindgren	21,302	23–29–10	56	Recap
63	February 28	NY Islanders	1–3	Montreal		Niemi	21,302	24–29–10	58	Recap

March: 4–9–2 (Home: 2–3–0; Road: 2–6–2)
#	Date	Visitor	Score	Home	OT	Decision	Attendance	Record	Pts	Recap
64	March 2	Montreal	6–3	NY Islanders		Lindgren	10,685	25–29–10	60	Recap
65	March 3	Montreal	1–2	Boston	OT	Niemi	17,565	25–29–11	61	Recap
66	March 6	Montreal	4–6	New Jersey		Lindgren	14,586	25–30–11	61	Recap
67	March 8	Montreal	0–5	Florida		Lindgren	14,901	25–31–11	61	Recap
68	March 10	Montreal	2–3	Tampa Bay	SO	Niemi	19,092	25–31–12	62	Recap
69	March 12	Montreal	2–5	Columbus		Lindgren	15,864	25–32–12	62	Recap
70	March 13	Dallas	2–4	Montreal		Niemi	21,302	26–32–12	64	Recap
71	March 15	Pittsburgh	5–3	Montreal		Niemi	21,302	26–33–12	64	Recap
72	March 17	Montreal	0–4	Toronto		Lindgren	19,364	26–34–12	64	Recap
73	March 19	Florida	2–0	Montreal		Niemi	21,302	26–35–12	64	Recap
74	March 21	Montreal	3–5	Pittsburgh		Price	18,574	26–36–12	64	Recap
75	March 23	Montreal	3–0	Buffalo		Niemi	18,594	27–36–12	66	Recap
76	March 24	Washington	6–4	Montreal		Price	21,302	27–37–12	66	Recap
77	March 26	Detroit	2–4	Montreal		Price	21,302	28–37–12	68	Recap
78	March 31	Montreal	2–5	Pittsburgh		Niemi	18,636	28–38–12	68	Recap

April: 1–2–1 (Home: 0–1–1; Road: 1–1–0)
#	Date	Visitor	Score	Home	OT	Decision	Attendance	Record	Pts	Recap
79	April 1	New Jersey	2–1	Montreal		Price	21,302	28–39–12	68	Recap
80	April 3	Winnipeg	5–4	Montreal	OT	Price	21,302	28–39–13	69	Recap
81	April 5	Montreal	4–3	Detroit		Niemi	19,515	29–39–13	71	Recap
82	April 7	Montreal	2–4	Toronto		Price	19,525	29–40–13	71	Recap

Legend: Win (2 points) Loss (0 points) Overtime/shootout loss (1 point)

== Player statistics ==
Final

=== Skaters ===
Regular season
Player	GP	G	A	Pts	+/−	PIM
Brendan Gallagher	82	31	23	54	−13	34
Alex Galchenyuk	82	19	32	51	−31	22
Jonathan Drouin	77	13	33	46	−28	30
Jeff Petry	82	12	30	42	−30	28
Max Pacioretty	64	17	20	37	−16	30
Paul Byron	82	20	15	35	−4	23
Charles Hudon	72	10	20	30	−12	38
Phillip Danault	52	8	17	25	0	34
Tomas Plekanec^{‡}	60	6	18	24	3	39
Artturi Lehkonen	66	12	9	21	−11	20
Andrew Shaw	51	10	10	20	−8	53
Shea Weber	26	6	10	16	−8	14
Daniel Carr	38	6	10	16	2	8
Jordie Benn	77	4	11	15	−2	34
Nicolas Deslauriers	58	10	4	14	7	55
Jacob de la Rose	55	4	8	12	−2	29
Karl Alzner	82	1	11	12	−7	40
Joe Morrow^{‡}	38	5	6	11	−11	26
Byron Froese	48	3	8	11	0	26
Mike Reilly^{†}	19	0	8	8	1	8
Victor Mete	49	0	7	7	5	4
Nikita Scherbak	26	4	2	6	−5	8
Logan Shaw^{†}	30	2	4	6	−5	8
David Schlemko	37	1	4	5	3	6
Jakub Jerabek^{‡}	25	1	3	4	−1	6
Noah Juulsen	23	1	2	3	1	4
Kerby Rychel	4	1	1	2	−2	2
Brandon Davidson^{‡}	13	0	1	1	−3	9
Michael McCarron	18	0	1	1	−1	32
Brett Lernout	18	0	1	1	−5	6
Rinat Valiev	2	0	0	0	0	2
Mark Streit	2	0	0	0	−2	0
Ales Hemsky	7	0	0	0	−1	10
Torrey Mitchell^{‡}	11	0	0	0	0	2

=== Goaltenders ===
Regular season
Player	GP	GS	TOI	W	L	OT	GA	GAA	SA	SV%	SO	G	A	PIM
Carey Price	49	48	2,854:37	16	26	7	148	3.11	1487	.900	1	0	0	0
Antti Niemi^{†}	19	17	1,026:16	7	5	4	42	2.46	592	.929	1	0	0	0
Charlie Lindgren	14	14	832:58	4	8	2	42	3.03	457	.908	2	0	0	2
Al Montoya^{‡}	4	3	222:31	2	1	0	14	3.77	102	.863	0	0	1	0

^{†}Denotes player spent time with another team before joining Canadiens. Stats reflect time with Canadiens only.
^{‡}Traded mid-season. Stats reflect time with Canadiens only.

== Awards and honours ==
=== Awards ===
Regular season
Player	Award	Awarded	Ref
Carey Price	NHL Second Star of the Week	December 4, 2017	
Carey Price	NHL All-Star Game selection	January 10, 2018	

=== Milestones ===
Regular season
Player	Milestone	Reached	Ref
Victor Mete	1st career NHL game	October 5, 2017	
Karl Alzner	100th career NHL assist	October 14, 2017	
Victor Mete	1st career NHL assist 1st career NHL point	October 17, 2017	
Jonathan Drouin	100th career NHL point	October 17, 2017	
Brendan Gallagher	100th career NHL assist	October 24, 2017	
Karl Alzner	600th career NHL game	October 24, 2017	
Andrew Shaw	400th career NHL game	October 26, 2017	
Charles Hudon	1st career NHL goal	October 30, 2017	
Charlie Lindgren	1st career NHL shutout	November 5, 2017	
Paul Byron	300th career NHL game	November 14, 2017	
Jakub Jerabek	1st career NHL game	November 22, 2017	
Brendan Gallagher	200th career NHL point	November 27, 2017	
Paul Byron	1st career NHL hat-trick	December 2, 2017	
Brendan Gallagher	100th career NHL goal	December 2, 2017	
Shea Weber	500th career NHL point	December 5, 2017	
Max Pacioretty	600th career NHL game	December 28, 2017	
Jonathan Drouin	200th career NHL game	January 4, 2018	
Alex Galchenyuk	100th career NHL goal	January 13, 2018	
Artturi Lehkonen	100th career NHL game	January 13, 2018	
Jakub Jerabek	1st career NHL assist 1st career NHL point	January 15, 2018	
Jakub Jerabek	1st career NHL goal	January 17, 2018	
Tomas Plekanec	600th career NHL point	February 4, 2018	
Jeff Petry	500th career NHL game	February 10, 2018	
Joe Morrow	100th career NHL game	February 17, 2018	
Noah Juulsen	1st career NHL game	February 22, 2018	
Byron Froese	100th career NHL game	February 28, 2018	
Jacob de la Rose	100th career NHL game	February 28, 2018	
Noah Juulsen	1st career NHL goal 1st career NHL point	March 2, 2018	
Alex Galchenyuk	400th career NHL game	March 2, 2018	
Brendan Gallagher	400th career NHL game	March 24, 2018	
Noah Juulsen	1st career NHL assist	March 26, 2018	
Mike Reilly	100th career NHL game	April 1, 2018	

== Transactions ==
The Canadiens have been involved in the following transactions during the 2017–18 season.

=== Trades ===
Date	Details		Ref
June 22, 2017	To Vegas Golden Knights 5th-round pick in 2019	To Montreal Canadiens David Schlemko	
October 4, 2017	To Buffalo Sabres Zach Redmond	To Montreal Canadiens Nicolas Deslauriers	
October 4, 2017	To Chicago Blackhawks Andreas Martinsen	To Montreal Canadiens Kyle Baun	
November 23, 2017	To Los Angeles Kings Torrey Mitchell	To Montreal Canadiens Conditional 5th-round pick in 2018	
November 30, 2017	To New York Rangers Peter Holland	To Montreal Canadiens Adam Cracknell	
January 4, 2018	To Edmonton Oilers Al Montoya	To Montreal Canadiens Conditional 4th-round pick in 2018	
February 21, 2018	To Washington Capitals Jakub Jerabek	To Montreal Canadiens 5th-round pick in 2019	
February 25, 2018	To Toronto Maple Leafs Kyle Baun; Tomas Plekanec^{[Note 1]}	To Montreal Canadiens Kerby Rychel; Rinat Valiev; 2nd-round pick in 2018	
February 26, 2018	To Winnipeg Jets Joe Morrow	To Montreal Canadiens 4th-round pick in 2018	
February 26, 2018	To Minnesota Wild 5th-round pick in 2019	To Montreal Canadiens Mike Reilly	
June 15, 2018	To Arizona Coyotes Alex Galchenyuk	To Montreal Canadiens Max Domi	

==== Notes ====
1. ^{Note 1} Montreal to retain 50% of Plekanec's remaining salary as part of trade.

=== Free agents acquired ===
Date	Player	Former team	Contract terms (in U.S. dollars)	Ref
July 1, 2017	Karl Alzner	Washington Capitals	5-year, $23.125 million	
July 1, 2017	Peter Holland	Arizona Coyotes	2-year, $1.35 million	
July 1, 2017	Byron Froese	Tampa Bay Lightning	2-year, $1.3 million	
July 1, 2017	Matt Taormina	Tampa Bay Lightning	2-year, $1.3 million two-way contract	
July 1, 2017	Joe Morrow	Boston Bruins	1-year, $650,000	
July 3, 2017	Ales Hemsky	Dallas Stars	1-year, $1 million	
July 25, 2017	Mark Streit	Pittsburgh Penguins	1-year, $700,000	
March 25, 2018	Hayden Verbeek	Sault Ste. Marie Greyhounds	3-year, $2.33 million entry-level contract	
April 24, 2018	Alexandre Alain	Blainville-Boisbriand Armada	3-year, $2.33 million entry-level contract	
May 28, 2018	Michal Moravcik	HC Plzeň	2-year, $1.85 million entry-level contract	
May 28, 2018	David Sklenicka	HC Plzeň	2-year, $1.85 million entry-level contract	

=== Free agents lost ===
Date	Player	New team	Contract terms (in U.S. dollars)	Ref
June 26, 2017	Ryan Johnston	Luleå HF	2-year	
July 1, 2017	Joel Hanley	Arizona Coyotes	1-year, $725,000 two-way contract	
July 1, 2017	Brian Flynn	Dallas Stars	1-year, $700,000 two-way contract	
July 1, 2017	Keegan Lowe	Edmonton Oilers	1-year, $650,000 two-way contract	
July 1, 2017	Stefan Matteau	Vegas Golden Knights	1-year, $650,000 two-way contract	
July 3, 2017	Alexander Radulov	Dallas Stars	5-year, $31.25 million	
July 6, 2017	Nikita Nesterov	CSKA Moscow	3-year	
July 28, 2017	Andrei Markov	Ak Bars Kazan	2-year	
August 4, 2017	Dalton Thrower	Allen Americans	2-year	
August 14, 2017	Dwight King	Avtomobilist Yekaterinburg	2-year	
August 17, 2017	Connor Crisp	Toledo Walleye	1-year	
September 5, 2017	Mark MacMillan	Wichita Thunder	Unknown	
June 8, 2018	Markus Eisenschmid	Adler Mannheim	2-year	

=== Claimed via waivers ===
Player	Previous team	Date	Ref
Antti Niemi	Florida Panthers	November 14, 2017	
Logan Shaw	Anaheim Ducks	January 15, 2018	

=== Lost via waivers ===
Player	New team	Date	Ref
Brandon Davidson	Edmonton Oilers	December 3, 2017	

=== Players released ===
Date	Player	Via	Ref
October 16, 2017	Mark Streit	Contract termination	
October 29, 2017	Martin Reway	Contract termination	

=== Lost via Expansion Draft ===
Date	Player	Ref
June 21, 2017	Alexei Emelin	

=== Player signings ===
Date	Player	Contract terms (in U.S. dollars)	Ref
June 28, 2017	Jacob de la Rose	1-year, $725,000 contract extension	
July 2, 2017	Carey Price	8-year, $84 million contract extension	
July 5, 2017	Alex Galchenyuk	3-year, $14.7 million contract extension	
July 6, 2017	Charlie Lindgren	1-year, $700,000 two-way contract extension	
February 13, 2018	Charlie Lindgren	3-year, $2.25 million contract extension	
February 19, 2018	Nicolas Deslauriers	2-year, $1.9 million contract extension	
March 7, 2018	William Bitten	3-year, $2.73 million entry-level contract	
March 7, 2018	Michael Pezzetta	3-year, $2.23 million entry-level contract	
April 9, 2018	Jake Evans	2-year, $1.85 million entry-level contract	
May 2, 2018	Lukas Vejdemo	2-year, $1.85 million entry-level contract	
May 22, 2018	Antti Niemi	1-year, $950,000 contract extension	
May 31, 2018	Rinat Valiev	1-year, $650,000 two-way contract extension	
June 16, 2018	Max Domi	2-year, $6.3 million contract extension	

== Draft picks ==
Below are the Montreal Canadiens' selections at the 2017 NHL entry draft, which was held on June 23 and 24, 2017 at the United Center in Chicago.

Round	#	Player	Pos	Nationality	College/Junior/Club team (League)
1	25	Ryan Poehling	C	United States	St. Cloud State University (NCHC)
2	56	Josh Brook	D	Canada	Moose Jaw Warriors (WHL)
2	58^{1}	Joni Ikonen	C	Finland	Frölunda HC (J20 SuperElit)
3	68^{2}	Scott Walford	D	Canada	Victoria Royals (WHL)
3	87	Cale Fleury	D	Canada	Kootenay Ice (WHL)
5	149	Jarret Tyszka	D	Canada	Seattle Thunderbirds (WHL)
7	199^{3}	Cayden Primeau	G	United States	Lincoln Stars (USHL)

=== Notes ===
1. The Washington Capitals' second-round pick went to the Montreal Canadiens as the result of a trade on June 24, 2016, that sent Lars Eller to Washington in exchange for a second-round pick in 2018 and this pick.
2. The Buffalo Sabres' third-round pick went to the Montreal Canadiens as the result of a trade on June 17, 2017, that sent Nathan Beaulieu to Buffalo in exchange for this pick.
3. The Philadelphia Flyers' seventh-round pick went to the Montreal Canadiens as the result of a trade on June 24, 2017, that sent a seventh-round pick in 2018 to Philadelphia in exchange for this pick.
