= 2017–18 Washington Capitals season =

NHL ice hockey team season (won Stanley Cup)

2017–18 Washington Capitals
- Stanley Cup champions
- Eastern Conference champions
- Metropolitan Division champions
- Division: 1st Metropolitan
- Conference: 3rd Eastern
- 2017–18 record: 49–26–7
- Home record: 28–11–2
- Road record: 21–15–5
- Goals for: 259
- Goals against: 239

Team information
- General manager: Brian MacLellan
- Coach: Barry Trotz
- Captain: Alexander Ovechkin
- Alternate captains: Nicklas Backstrom; Brooks Orpik
- Arena: Capital One Arena
- Average attendance: 18,774
- Minor league affiliates: Hershey Bears (AHL); South Carolina Stingrays (ECHL)

Team leaders
- Goals: Alexander Ovechkin (49)
- Assists: Evgeny Kuznetsov (56)
- Points: Alexander Ovechkin (87)
- Penalty minutes: Tom Wilson (187)
- Plus/minus: Matt Niskanen (+24)
- Wins: Braden Holtby (34)
- Goals against average: Philipp Grubauer (2.35)

The 2017–18 Washington Capitals season was the 43rd season for the National Hockey League (NHL) franchise that was established on June 11, 1974. They played their home games at Capital One Arena in Washington, D.C., were led by head coach Barry Trotz in his fourth season as coach of the Capitals. The Capitals won their first Stanley Cup in franchise history, defeating the upstart Vegas Golden Knights, a first-year expansion team in the Stanley Cup Final.

The Capitals finished the regular season with 105 points, winning the Metropolitan Division for the third year in a row. Left winger and team captain Alexander Ovechkin secured his seventh Maurice "Rocket" Richard Trophy, by leading the league with 49 goals. Fellow Russian Evgeny Kuznetsov led the team in assists with 56.

In the Stanley Cup Playoffs, they lost the first two games of their first round series against the Columbus Blue Jackets before winning the next four games to advance to the Conference Semi-finals against their arch-rival, the two-time defending Stanley Cup champion's Pittsburgh Penguins, who ended the Capitals' playoffs during each of the previous two years. The Capitals defeated the Penguins in six games to advance the Eastern Conference Finals, their first trip to a conference championship series since 1998. The Capitals defeated the top seeded Tampa Bay Lightning in the Eastern Conference Finals in seven games, after overcoming a 3–2 series deficit following a Game 5 loss for the first time in franchise history, with goaltender Braden Holtby posting shutouts in both Games 6 and 7 in the process, to earn their first trip to the Stanley Cup Final since 1998, when they were swept by the Detroit Red Wings. Making their first Stanley Cup Final appearance in twenty years, the Capitals went up against the upstart Vegas Golden Knights and emerged victorious in five games to claim the franchise's inaugural Stanley Cup championship, while becoming the 100th Stanley Cup champions since 1914. Team captain Alexander Ovechkin was awarded the Conn Smythe Trophy as the MVP of the playoffs for the first time in his career.

== Standings ==
Metropolitan Division
Pos	Team	GP	W	L	OTL	ROW	GF	GA	GD	Pts
1	y – Washington Capitals	82	49	26	7	46	259	239	+20	105
2	x – Pittsburgh Penguins	82	47	29	6	45	272	250	+22	100
3	x – Philadelphia Flyers	82	42	26	14	40	251	243	+8	98
4	x – Columbus Blue Jackets	82	45	30	7	39	242	230	+12	97
5	x – New Jersey Devils	82	44	29	9	39	248	244	+4	97
6	Carolina Hurricanes	82	36	35	11	33	228	256	−28	83
7	New York Islanders	82	35	37	10	32	264	296	−32	80
8	New York Rangers	82	34	39	9	31	231	268	−37	77

Source: National Hockey League
x – Clinched playoff spot; y – Clinched division

== Schedule and results ==
=== Preseason ===
The Capitals' preseason schedule was released on June 7, 2017.

2017 preseason game log: 2–5–0 (Home: 0–3–0; Road: 2–2–0)

Game	Date	Opponent	Score	Record
1	September 18	@ New Jersey Devils	1–4	0–1–0
2	September 20	@ Montreal Canadiens	4–2	1–1–0
3	September 22	St. Louis Blues	0–4	1–2–0
4	September 23	Carolina Hurricanes	1–4	1–3–0
5	September 27	New Jersey Devils	1–4	1–4–0
6	September 29	@ Carolina Hurricanes	1–3	1–5–0
7	October 1	@ St. Louis Blues	4–3	2–5–0

=== Regular season ===
The team released its regular season schedule on June 22, 2017.

2017–18 game log
October: 5–6–1, 11 points (Home: 1–3–0; Road: 4–3–1)

Game	Date	Opponent	Score	OT	Decision	Location	Attendance	Record	Points	Recap
1	October 5	@ Ottawa	5–4	SO	Holtby	Canadian Tire Centre	17,009	1–0–0	2	Recap
2	October 7	Montreal	6–1		Holtby	Capital One Arena	18,506	2–0–0	4	Recap
3	October 9	@ Tampa Bay	3–4	OT	Grubauer	Amalie Arena	19,092	2–0–1	5	Recap
4	October 11	Pittsburgh	2–3		Holtby	Capital One Arena	18,506	2–1–1	5	Recap
5	October 13	@ New Jersey	5–2		Holtby	Prudential Center	13,458	3–1–1	7	Recap
6	October 14	@ Philadelphia	2–8		Grubauer	Wells Fargo Center	19,817	3–2–1	7	Recap
7	October 17	Toronto	0–2		Holtby	Capital One Arena	18,506	3–3–1	7	Recap
8	October 20	@ Detroit	4–3	OT	Holtby	Little Caesars Arena	19,515	4–3–1	9	Recap
9	October 21	Florida	1–4		Grubauer	Capital One Arena	18,506	4–4–1	9	Recap
10	October 26	@ Vancouver	2–6		Holtby	Rogers Arena	18,293	4–5–1	9	Recap
11	October 28	@ Edmonton	5–2		Holtby	Rogers Place	18,347	5–5–1	11	Recap
12	October 29	@ Calgary	1–2		Grubauer	Scotiabank Saddledome	18,327	5–6–1	11	Recap

November: 9–5–0, 18 points (Home: 7–2–0; Road: 2–3–0)

Game	Date	Opponent	Score	OT	Decision	Location	Attendance	Record	Points	Recap
13	November 2	NY Islanders	4–3		Holtby	Capital One Arena	18,506	6–6–1	13	Recap
14	November 4	@ Boston	3–2		Holtby	TD Garden	17,565	7–6–1	15	Recap
15	November 6	Arizona	3–2	OT	Holtby	Capital One Arena	18,506	8–6–1	17	Recap
16	November 7	@ Buffalo	1–3		Grubauer	KeyBank Center	17,146	8–7–1	17	Recap
17	November 10	Pittsburgh	4–1		Holtby	Capital One Arena	18,506	9–7–1	19	Recap
18	November 12	Edmonton	2–1	SO	Holtby	Capital One Arena	18,506	10–7–1	21	Recap
19	November 14	@ Nashville	3–6		Holtby	Bridgestone Arena	17,113	10–8–1	21	Recap
20	November 16	@ Colorado	2–6		Grubauer	Pepsi Center	15,070	10–9–1	21	Recap
21	November 18	Minnesota	3–1		Holtby	Capital One Arena	18,506	11–9–1	23	Recap
22	November 20	Calgary	1–4		Holtby	Capital One Arena	18,506	11–10–1	23	Recap
23	November 22	Ottawa	5–2		Holtby	Capital One Arena	18,506	12–10–1	25	Recap
24	November 24	Tampa Bay	3–1		Grubauer	Capital One Arena	18,506	13–10–1	27	Recap
25	November 25	@ Toronto	4–2		Holtby	Air Canada Centre	19,404	14–10–1	29	Recap
26	November 30	Los Angeles	2–5		Holtby	Capital One Arena	18,506	14–11–1	29	Recap

December: 10–2–2, 22 points (Home: 8–0–0; Road: 2–2–2)

Game	Date	Opponent	Score	OT	Decision	Location	Attendance	Record	Points	Recap
27	December 2	Columbus	4–3		Holtby	Capital One Arena	18,506	15–11–1	31	Recap
28	December 4	San Jose	4–1		Grubauer	Capital One Arena	18,506	16–11–1	33	Recap
29	December 6	Chicago	6–2		Holtby	Capital One Arena	18,506	17–11–1	35	Recap
30	December 8	NY Rangers	4–2		Holtby	Capital One Arena	18,506	18–11–1	37	Recap
31	December 11	@ NY Islanders	1–3		Holtby	Barclays Center	11,053	18–12–1	37	Recap
32	December 12	Colorado	5–2		Holtby	Capital One Arena	18,506	19–12–1	39	Recap
33	December 14	@ Boston	5–3		Holtby	TD Garden	17,565	20–12–1	41	Recap
34	December 16	Anaheim	3–2	OT	Holtby	Capital One Arena	18,506	21–12–1	43	Recap
35	December 19	@ Dallas	4–3	OT	Holtby	American Airlines Center	18,112	22–12–1	45	Recap
36	December 22	@ Arizona	2–3	OT	Grubauer	Gila River Arena	10,904	22–12–2	46	Recap
37	December 23	@ Vegas	0–3		Holtby	T-Mobile Arena	18,025	22–13–2	46	Recap
38	December 27	@ NY Rangers	0–1	SO	Grubauer	Madison Square Garden	18,006	22–13–3	47	Recap
39	December 28	Boston	4–3	SO	Holtby	Capital One Arena	18,506	23–13–3	49	Recap
40	December 30	New Jersey	5–2		Holtby	Capital One Arena	18,506	24–13–3	51	Recap

January: 6–2–2, 14 points (Home: 3–2–1; Road: 3–0–1)

Game	Date	Opponent	Score	OT	Decision	Location	Attendance	Record	Points	Recap
41	January 2	@ Carolina	5–4	OT	Holtby	PNC Arena	11,989	25–13–3	53	Recap
42	January 7	St. Louis	4–3	OT	Holtby	Capital One Arena	18,506	26–13–3	55	Recap
43	January 9	Vancouver	3–1		Grubauer	Capital One Arena	18,506	27–13–3	57	Recap
44	January 11	Carolina	1–3		Holtby	Capital One Arena	18,506	27–14–3	57	Recap
45	January 12	@ Carolina	4–3		Grubauer	PNC Arena	16,239	28–14–3	59	Recap
46	January 18	@ New Jersey	3–4	OT	Holtby	Prudential Center	14,163	28–14–4	60	Recap
47	January 19	Montreal	2–3		Grubauer	Capital One Arena	18,506	28–15–4	60	Recap
48	January 21	Philadelphia	1–2	OT	Holtby	Capital One Arena	18,506	28–15–5	61	Recap
49	January 25	@ Florida	4–2		Holtby	BB&T Center	14,033	29–15–5	63	Recap
50	January 31	Philadelphia	5–3		Holtby	Capital One Arena	18,506	30–15–5	65	Recap

February: 6–6–2, 14 points (Home: 3–2–1; Road: 3–4–1)

Game	Date	Opponent	Score	OT	Decision	Location	Attendance	Record	Points	Recap
51	February 2	@ Pittsburgh	4–7		Holtby	PPG Paints Arena	18,652	30–16–5	65	Recap
52	February 4	Vegas	3–4		Grubauer	Capital One Arena	18,506	30–17–5	65	Recap
53	February 6	@ Columbus	3–2		Holtby	Nationwide Arena	16,419	31–17–5	67	Recap
54	February 9	Columbus	4–2		Holtby	Capital One Arena	18,506	32–17–5	69	Recap
55	February 11	Detroit	4–5	OT	Holtby	Capital One Arena	18,506	32–17–6	70	Recap
56	February 13	@ Winnipeg	3–4	OT	Holtby	Bell MTS Place	15,321	32–17–7	71	Recap
57	February 15	@ Minnesota	5–2		Grubauer	Xcel Energy Center	19,027	33–17–7	73	Recap
58	February 17	@ Chicago	1–7		Holtby	United Center	22,066	33–18–7	73	Recap
59	February 19	@ Buffalo	3–2		Grubauer	KeyBank Center	18,228	34–18–7	75	Recap
60	February 20	Tampa Bay	2–4		Holtby	Capital One Arena	18,506	34–19–7	75	Recap
61	February 22	@ Florida	2–3		Holtby	BB&T Center	15,312	34–20–7	75	Recap
62	February 24	Buffalo	5–1		Grubauer	Capital One Arena	18,506	35–20–7	77	Recap
63	February 26	@ Columbus	1–5		Holtby	Nationwide Arena	17,386	35–21–7	77	Recap
64	February 27	Ottawa	3–2		Grubauer	Capital One Arena	18,506	36–21–7	79	Recap

March: 10–4–0, 20 points (Home: 5–1–0; Road: 5–3–0)

Game	Date	Opponent	Score	OT	Decision	Location	Attendance	Record	Points	Recap
65	March 3	Toronto	5–2		Holtby	Navy–Marine Corps Memorial Stadium	29,516 (outdoors)	37–21–7	81	Recap
66	March 6	@ Anaheim	0–4		Holtby	Honda Center	15,910	37–22–7	81	Recap
67	March 8	@ Los Angeles	1–3		Grubauer	Staples Center	18,230	37–23–7	81	Recap
68	March 10	@ San Jose	2–0		Grubauer	SAP Center	17,562	38–23–7	83	Recap
69	March 12	Winnipeg	3–2	OT	Grubauer	Capital One Arena	18,506	39–23–7	85	Recap
70	March 15	@ NY Islanders	7–3		Grubauer	Barclays Center	10,740	40–23–7	87	Recap
71	March 16	NY Islanders	6–3		Holtby	Capital One Arena	18,506	41–23–7	89	Recap
72	March 18	@ Philadelphia	3–6		Grubauer	Wells Fargo Center	19,687	41–24–7	89	Recap
73	March 20	Dallas	4–3		Holtby	Capital One Arena	18,506	42–24–7	91	Recap
74	March 22	@ Detroit	1–0		Grubauer	Little Caesars Arena	19,515	43–24–7	93	Recap
75	March 24	@ Montreal	6–4		Grubauer	Bell Centre	21,302	44–24–7	95	Recap
76	March 26	@ NY Rangers	4–2		Grubauer	Madison Square Garden	18,006	45–24–7	97	Recap
77	March 28	NY Rangers	3–2	OT	Holtby	Capital One Arena	18,506	46–24–7	99	Recap
78	March 30	Carolina	1–4		Holtby	Capital One Arena	18,506	46–25–7	99	Recap

April: 3–1–0, 6 points (Home: 1–1–0; Road: 2–0–0)

Game	Date	Opponent	Score	OT	Decision	Location	Attendance	Record	Points	Recap
79	April 1	@ Pittsburgh	3–1		Grubauer	PPG Paints Arena	18,639	47–25–7	101	Recap
80	April 2	@ St. Louis	4–2		Holtby	Scottrade Center	18,841	48–25–7	103	Recap
81	April 5	Nashville	3–4		Grubauer	Capital One Arena	18,506	48–26–7	103	Recap
82	April 7	New Jersey	5–3		Holtby	Capital One Arena	18,506	49–26–7	105	Recap

Win (2 Points) Loss (0 points) Overtime/shootout loss (1 point)

=== Playoffs ===
The Capitals endured hardships during their first successful Stanley Cup run through 24 games, and simultaneously became the second Stanley Cup champion to trail at least once in all four playoff rounds (1990–91 Pittsburgh Penguins) and the fourth to drop the first two games of the first series at home (2001–02 Detroit Red Wings, 2005–06 Carolina Hurricanes, and 2010–11 Boston Bruins). This also tied this run with four others for the third-longest to a Stanley Cup championship, ever.

2018 Stanley Cup playoffs
Eastern Conference First Round vs. (WC1) Columbus Blue Jackets: Washington won 4–2

Game	Date	Opponent	Score	OT	Decision	Location	Attendance	Series	Recap
1	April 12	Columbus	3–4	OT	Grubauer	Capital One Arena	18,506	0–1	Recap
2	April 15	Columbus	4–5	OT	Holtby	Capital One Arena	18,506	0–2	Recap
3	April 17	@ Columbus	3–2	2OT	Holtby	Nationwide Arena	19,337	1–2	Recap
4	April 19	@ Columbus	4–1		Holtby	Nationwide Arena	19,395	2–2	Recap
5	April 21	Columbus	4–3	OT	Holtby	Capital One Arena	18,506	3–2	Recap
6	April 23	@ Columbus	6–3		Holtby	Nationwide Arena	18,667	4–2	Recap

Eastern Conference Second Round vs. (M2) Pittsburgh Penguins: Washington won 4–2

Game	Date	Opponent	Score	OT	Decision	Location	Attendance	Series	Recap
1	April 26	Pittsburgh	2–3		Holtby	Capital One Arena	18,506	0–1	Recap
2	April 29	Pittsburgh	4–1		Holtby	Capital One Arena	18,506	1–1	Recap
3	May 1	@ Pittsburgh	4–3		Holtby	PPG Paints Arena	18,634	2–1	Recap
4	May 3	@ Pittsburgh	1–3		Holtby	PPG Paints Arena	18,650	2–2	Recap
5	May 5	Pittsburgh	6–3		Holtby	Capital One Arena	18,506	3–2	Recap
6	May 7	@ Pittsburgh	2–1	OT	Holtby	PPG Paints Arena	18,621	4–2	Recap

Eastern Conference Finals vs. (A1) Tampa Bay Lightning: Washington won 4–3

Game	Date	Opponent	Score	OT	Decision	Location	Attendance	Series	Recap
1	May 11	@ Tampa Bay	4–2		Holtby	Amalie Arena	19,092	1–0	Recap
2	May 13	@ Tampa Bay	6–2		Holtby	Amalie Arena	19,092	2–0	Recap
3	May 15	Tampa Bay	2–4		Holtby	Capital One Arena	18,506	2–1	Recap
4	May 17	Tampa Bay	2–4		Holtby	Capital One Arena	18,506	2–2	Recap
5	May 19	@ Tampa Bay	2–3		Holtby	Amalie Arena	19,092	2–3	Recap
6	May 21	Tampa Bay	3–0		Holtby	Capital One Arena	18,506	3–3	Recap
7	May 23	@ Tampa Bay	4–0		Holtby	Amalie Arena	19,092	4–3	Recap

Stanley Cup Final vs. (P1) Vegas Golden Knights: Washington won 4–1

Game	Date	Opponent	Score	OT	Decision	Location	Attendance	Series	Recap
1	May 28	@ Vegas	4–6		Holtby	T-Mobile Arena	18,575	0–1	Recap
2	May 30	@ Vegas	3–2		Holtby	T-Mobile Arena	18,702	1–1	Recap
3	June 2	Vegas	3–1		Holtby	Capital One Arena	18,506	2–1	Recap
4	June 4	Vegas	6–2		Holtby	Capital One Arena	18,506	3–1	Recap
5	June 7	@ Vegas	4–3		Holtby	T-Mobile Arena	18,529	4–1	Recap

Win Loss

== Player statistics ==
Final Stats

Skaters

Regular season
Player	GP	G	A	Pts	+/−	PIM
Alexander Ovechkin	82	49	38	87	3	32
Evgeny Kuznetsov	79	27	56	83	3	48
Nicklas Backstrom	81	21	50	71	5	46
John Carlson	82	15	53	68	0	32
T. J. Oshie	74	18	29	47	2	31
Lars Eller	81	18	20	38	−6	38
Tom Wilson	78	14	21	35	10	187
Dmitry Orlov	82	10	21	31	10	22
Matt Niskanen	68	7	22	29	24	36
Brett Connolly	70	15	12	27	−6	30
Jakub Vrana	73	13	14	27	2	12
Andre Burakovsky	56	12	13	25	3	27
Jay Beagle	79	7	15	22	3	16
Alex Chiasson	61	9	9	18	1	26
Chandler Stephenson	67	6	12	18	13	8
Devante Smith-Pelly	75	7	9	16	−6	38
Christian Djoos	63	3	11	14	13	10
Madison Bowey	51	0	12	12	−3	24
Brooks Orpik	81	0	10	10	−9	68
Taylor Chorney^{‡}	24	1	3	4	8	8
Jakub Jerabek^{†}	11	1	3	4	−1	0
Michal Kempny^{†}	22	2	1	3	1	14
Nathan Walker^{†}	7	1	0	1	1	4
Shane Gersich	3	0	1	1	−1	0
Travis Boyd	8	0	1	1	2	2
Aaron Ness	8	0	1	1	2	8
Liam O'Brien	3	0	0	0	0	5
Anthony Peluso	2	0	0	0	0	4
Tyler Graovac	5	0	0	0	−3	2

Playoffs
Player	GP	G	A	Pts	+/−	PIM
Evgeny Kuznetsov	24	12	20	32	12	16
Alexander Ovechkin	24	15	12	27	8	8
Nicklas Backstrom	20	5	18	23	−1	6
T. J. Oshie	24	8	13	21	5	31
John Carlson	24	5	15	20	11	8
Lars Eller	24	7	11	18	6	18
Tom Wilson	21	5	10	15	11	31
Brett Connolly	24	6	3	9	4	6
Matt Niskanen	24	1	8	9	6	8
Devante Smith-Pelly	24	7	1	8	−2	12
Jakub Vrana	23	3	5	8	5	2
Dmitry Orlov	24	2	6	8	5	4
Jay Beagle	23	2	6	8	7	8
Chandler Stephenson	24	2	5	7	3	8
Andre Burakovsky	13	2	4	6	2	4
Michal Kempny	24	2	3	5	1	10
Brooks Orpik	24	1	4	5	17	15
Alex Chiasson	16	1	1	2	0	4
Christian Djoos	22	0	1	1	5	4
Jakub Jerabek	2	0	1	1	−1	2
Nathan Walker	1	0	1	1	1	0
Shane Gersich	2	0	0	0	−1	0
Travis Boyd	1	0	0	0	0	0

Goaltenders

Regular season
Player	GP	GS	TOI	W	L	OT	GA	GAA	SA	SV%	SO	G	A	PIM
Braden Holtby	54	54	3,067:48	34	16	4	153	2.99	1,648	.907	0	0	0	2
Philipp Grubauer	35	28	1,864:48	15	10	3	73	2.35	953	.923	3	0	1	0

Playoffs
Player	GP	GS	TOI	W	L	GA	GAA	SA	SV%	SO	G	A	PIM
Braden Holtby	23	22	1385:45	16	7	50	2.16	639	.922	2	0	1	2
Philipp Grubauer	2	2	105:23	0	1	8	4.55	49	.837	0	0	0	0

^{†}Denotes player spent time with another team before joining the Capitals. Statistics reflect time with the Capitals only.
^{‡}Denotes player was traded mid-season. Statistics reflect time with the Capitals only.

== Transactions ==
The Capitals have been involved in the following transactions during the 2017–18 season.

=== Trades ===
Date	Details		Ref
July 3, 2017	To New Jersey Devils Marcus Johansson	To Washington Capitals FLA 2nd-round pick in 2018; TOR 3rd-round pick in 2018
February 9, 2018	To New York Rangers John Albert; Hubert Labrie	To Washington Capitals Adam Chapie; Joe Whitney
February 19, 2018	To Chicago Blackhawks Conditional 3rd-round pick in 2018	To Washington Capitals Michal Kempny
February 21, 2018	To Montreal Canadiens 5th-round draft pick in 2019	To Washington Capitals Jakub Jerabek

=== Free agents acquired ===
Date	Player	Former team	Contract terms (in U.S. dollars)	Ref
July 1, 2017	John Albert	Karpat	1-year, $650,000	
July 1, 2017	Anthony Peluso	Winnipeg Jets	1-year, $650,000	
July 3, 2017	Devante Smith-Pelly	New Jersey Devils	1-year, $650,000	
July 11, 2017	Wayne Simpson	Providence Bruins	1-year, $650,000	
October 4, 2017	Alex Chiasson	Calgary Flames	1-year, $660,000	
May 2, 2018	Juuso Ikonen	Brynas IF	2-year, $1.85 million entry-level contract	
May 9, 2018	Mathias Bau	Hershey Bears	1-year, $700,000 entry-level contract	
May 9, 2018	Maximilian Kammerer	Dusseldorfer EG	3-year, $2.775 million entry-level contract	

=== Free agents lost ===
Date	Player	New team	Contract terms (in U.S. dollars)	Ref
June 20, 2017	Chris Bourque	Hershey Bears	1-year	
July 1, 2017	Karl Alzner	Montreal Canadiens	5-year, $23.125 million	
July 1, 2017	Joe Cannata	Colorado Avalanche	1-year, $650,000	
July 1, 2017	Paul Carey	New York Rangers	1-year, $650,000	
July 1, 2017	Kevin Shattenkirk	New York Rangers	4-year, $26.6 million	
July 1, 2017	Justin Williams	Carolina Hurricanes	2-year, $9 million	
July 10, 2017	Garrett Mitchell	Hershey Bears	1-year	
July 14, 2017	Stanislav Galiev	Ak Bars Kazan	2-year	
July 21, 2017	Tom Gilbert	Thomas Sabo Ice Tigers	1-year	
August 15, 2017	Cody Corbett	Idaho Steelheads	1-year	
September 13, 2017	Christian Thomas	Wilkes-Barre/Scranton Penguins	1-year	

=== Claimed via waivers ===
Player	Previous team	Date	Ref
Nathan Walker	Edmonton Oilers	December 20, 2017	

=== Lost via waivers ===
Player	New team	Date	Ref
Nathan Walker	Edmonton Oilers	December 1, 2017	
Taylor Chorney	Columbus Blue Jackets	February 21, 2018	

=== Players released ===
Date	Player	Via	Ref

=== Lost via retirement ===
Date	Player	Ref

=== Player signings ===
Date	Player	Contract terms (in U.S. dollars)	Ref
June 22, 2017	Christian Djoos	2-year, $1.3 million	
June 23, 2017	T. J. Oshie	8-year, $46 million	
June 26, 2017	Brett Connolly	2-year, $3 million	
June 28, 2017	Pheonix Copley	2-year, $1.3 million	
June 29, 2017	Chandler Stephenson	2-year, $1.3 million	
July 2, 2017	Evgeny Kuznetsov	8-year, $62.4 million	
July 4, 2017	Andre Burakovsky	2-year, $6 million	
July 5, 2017	Travis Boyd	1-year, $650,000	
July 6, 2017	Philipp Grubauer	1-year, $1.5 million	
July 14, 2017	Liam O'Brien	1-year, $650,000	
February 10, 2018	Lars Eller	5-year, $17.5 million contract extension	
March 22, 2018	Tobias Geisser	3-year, $2.6 million entry-level contract	
March 23, 2018	Shane Gersich	2-year, $1.85 million entry-level contract	
April 4, 2018	Brian Pinho	2-year, $1.85 million entry-level contract	
May 2, 2018	Axel Jonsson-Fjallby	3-year, $2.58 million entry-level contract	
May 4, 2018	Ilya Samsonov	3-year, $4.425 million entry-level contract	
May 16, 2018	Aaron Ness	1-year, $650,000 contract extension	
May 18, 2018	Tyler Lewington	2-year, $1.35 million contract extension	

== Draft picks ==
Below are the Washington Capitals' selections at the 2017 NHL entry draft, which was held on June 23 and 24, 2017 at the United Center in Chicago.

Round	#	Player	Pos	Nationality	College/Junior/Club team (League)
4	120	Tobias Geisser	D	Switzerland	EVZ Academy (NLB)
5	151	Sebastian Walfridsson	D	Sweden	Modo Hockey (J20 SuperElit)
6	182	Benton Maass	D	United States	Elk River High School (USHS)
7	213	Kristian Roykas Marthinsen	LW	Norway	Almtuna IS (J20 SuperElit)
