= Jack Rodewald =

Canadian ice hockey player

- Born: February 14, 1994 (age 32) Winnipeg, Manitoba, Canada
- Height: 6 ft 2 in (188 cm)
- Weight: 190 lb (86 kg; 13 st 8 lb)
- Position: Right wing
- Shoots: Right
- KHL team Former teams: Salavat Yulaev Ufa; Ottawa Senators; HC Oceláři Třinec; HC TPS; Kunlun Red Star; Traktor Chelyabinsk; Admiral Vladivostok
- NHL draft: Undrafted
- Playing career: 2015–present

Jack Rodewald (born February 14, 1994) is a Canadian professional ice hockey forward who is currently playing under contract with Salavat Yulaev Ufa of the Kontinental Hockey League (KHL).

== Playing career ==
Undrafted, Rodewald played major junior with the Regina Pats and Moose Jaw Warriors in the Western Hockey League. Upon completion of his final season with the Warriors in 2014–15, he embarked on his professional career by signing as a free agent to a one-year AHL contract with the Toronto Marlies on March 26, 2015. He joined the club immediately on an amateur try-out in closing out the season with 1 assist in 9 games.

At the beginning of his second season playing within the Ottawa Senators AHL affiliates in 2017–18, Rodewald signed his first NHL contract by agreeing to a two-year entry-level contract with the Senators on October 24, 2017. He was immediately recalled by Ottawa and made his NHL debut in a 5–4 shootout defeat to the New Jersey Devils on October 27, 2017.

On June 27, 2019, Rodewald was signed to a one-year, two-way $725,000 contract extension to remain with the Senators. Rodewald began the 2019–20 season in the AHL with the Belleville Senators. After going scoreless in 6 games, Rodewald was traded by the Senators to the Florida Panthers in exchange for the rights of Chris Wilkie on October 27, 2019.

As a free agent from the Panthers, Rodewald to continue his career opted to sign abroad in Europe, signing mid-season into the 2020–21 campaign with Czech club, HC Oceláři Třinec of the ELH, on January 3, 2021.

During his second season with Kunlun Red Star in 2023–24, Rodewald contributed with 6 goals and 16 points through 44 regular season games before he was traded to fellow KHL club, Traktor Chelyabinsk, in exchange for financial compensation on December 27, 2023.

Playing out his contract with Traktor, Rodewald as a free agent in the off-season continued his tenure in the KHL, joining Admiral Vladivostok for the 2024–25 season on June 17, 2024. Rodewald enjoyed his most productive European season with Vladivostok, contributing with 17 goals and 29 points through 67 regular season games to help the club qualify for the post-season.

At the conclusion of his contract with Admiral, Rodewald was signed to a one-year contract with divisional rival, Salavat Yulaev Ufa, on June 9, 2025.

== Career statistics ==
			Regular season					Playoffs
Season	Team	League	GP	G	A	Pts	PIM	GP	G	A	Pts	PIM
2010–11	Regina Pats	WHL	2	0	0	0	0	—	—	—	—	—
2011–12	Regina Pats	WHL	68	6	6	12	37	5	0	0	0	2
2012–13	Regina Pats	WHL	56	7	7	14	40	—	—	—	—	—
2013–14	Moose Jaw Warriors	WHL	58	28	27	55	56	—	—	—	—	—
2014–15	Moose Jaw Warriors	WHL	71	35	50	85	72	—	—	—	—	—
2014–15	Toronto Marlies	AHL	9	0	1	1	2	3	1	0	1	2
2015–16	Orlando Solar Bears	ECHL	62	18	29	47	44	—	—	—	—	—
2015–16	Toronto Marlies	AHL	7	0	1	1	4	—	—	—	—	—
2016–17	Wichita Thunder	ECHL	6	5	3	8	2	—	—	—	—	—
2016–17	Binghamton Senators	AHL	66	18	9	27	34	—	—	—	—	—
2017–18	Belleville Senators	AHL	62	14	11	25	51	—	—	—	—	—
2017–18	Ottawa Senators	NHL	4	0	0	0	2	—	—	—	—	—
2018–19	Belleville Senators	AHL	59	23	24	47	12	—	—	—	—	—
2018–19	Ottawa Senators	NHL	6	0	0	0	0	—	—	—	—	—
2019–20	Belleville Senators	AHL	6	0	0	0	4	—	—	—	—	—
2019–20	Springfield Thunderbirds	AHL	43	5	11	16	21	—	—	—	—	—
2020–21	HC Oceláři Třinec	ELH	22	5	10	15	14	16	6	3	9	18
2021–22	TPS	Liiga	50	12	10	22	6	18	2	3	5	4
2022–23	Kunlun Red Star	KHL	52	12	15	27	59	—	—	—	—	—
2023–24	Kunlun Red Star	KHL	44	6	10	16	30	—	—	—	—	—
2023–24	Traktor Chelyabinsk	KHL	15	2	3	5	2	14	2	3	5	6
2024–25	Admiral Vladivostok	KHL	67	17	12	29	41	3	0	1	1	2
2025–26	Salavat Yulaev Ufa	KHL	67	21	23	44	20	10	1	3	4	9
NHL totals			10	0	0	0	2	—	—	—	—	—
KHL totals			245	58	63	121	152	27	3	7	10	17
