= Mike Condon (ice hockey) =

American ice hockey player (born 1990)

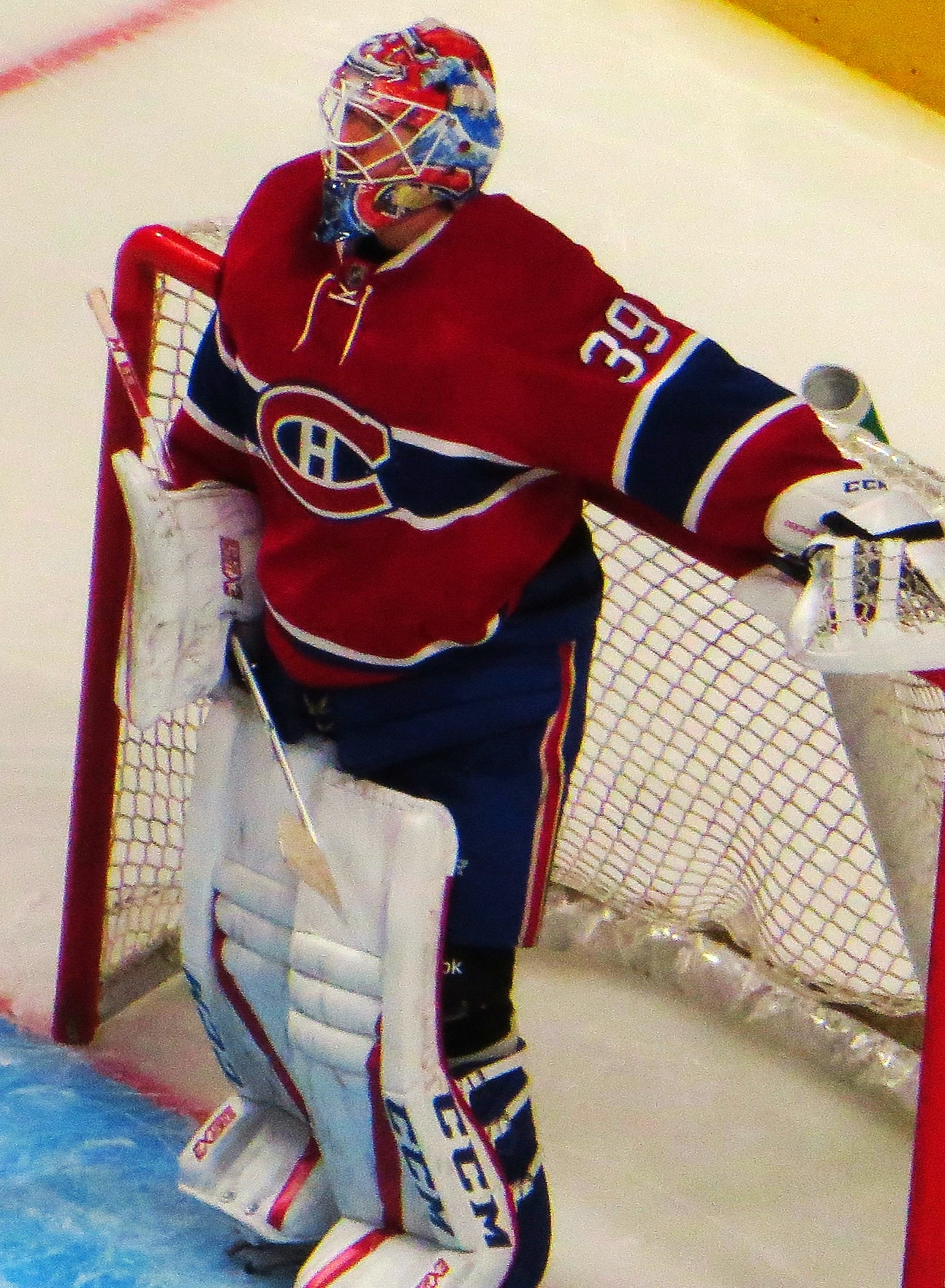
- Condon with the Montreal Canadiens in 2016
- Born: April 27, 1990 (age 36) Holliston, Massachusetts, U.S.
- Height: 6 ft 2 in (188 cm)
- Weight: 197 lb (89 kg; 14 st 1 lb)
- Position: Goaltender
- Caught: Left
- Played for: Montreal Canadiens; Pittsburgh Penguins; Ottawa Senators
- National team: United States
- NHL draft: Undrafted
- Playing career: 2013–2020
- Coaching career

Biographical details
- Education: Princeton University

Coaching career (HC unless noted)
- 2021–2023: Northeastern University (assistant)

Mike Condon (born April 27, 1990) is an American former professional ice hockey goaltender who currently serves as a volunteer assistant goalie coach at Northeastern University. Originally undrafted by teams in the National Hockey League (NHL), Condon has played for the Montreal Canadiens, Pittsburgh Penguins and Ottawa Senators.

== Early life ==
Condon was born on April 27, 1990, to Mary and Teddy Condon in Holliston, Massachusetts. He has one older brother, Zach. His father is a sergeant for the Massachusetts State Police, and his mother is a real estate broker. His father was involved in the manhunt of the Boston Marathon bombers. Condon attended the Belmont Hill School before attending Princeton University, where he majored in politics.

== Playing career ==
Undrafted at the conclusion of his career with Princeton, Condon signed an amateur tryout agreement with the Ontario Reign of the ECHL On April 7, 2013, after four games with the Reign where he went 3–1–0 with a 1.48 goals against average, Condon signed a professional tryout agreement with the Houston Aeros of the American Hockey League (AHL).

On May 8, 2013, Condon signed his first professional contract with the Montreal Canadiens of the National Hockey League (NHL).

On October 11, 2015, Condon started his first NHL game, leading the Canadiens to a 3–1 win against the Ottawa Senators. He stopped 20 of 21 shots, only allowing one goal against from Senators forward Jean-Gabriel Pageau. Senators goaltender Matt O'Connor made his NHL debut in the same game, making the two the first goaltenders to make their first NHL start on the same night since October 14, 1967. On November 9, Condon was named the NHL third star of the week for his play filling in for the injured Carey Price.

On October 11, 2016, Condon was claimed off waivers from the Montreal Canadiens by the Pittsburgh Penguins after being waived the previous day. He would only play one period (20 minutes) in relief for the Penguins before being traded to the Ottawa Senators on November 2 for a fifth-round draft pick in 2017. Condon was acquired due to Senators' starter Craig Anderson facing an uncertain future after his wife was diagnosed with cancer, and backup Andrew Hammond being sidelined with an injury.

In June 2017, Condon signed a three-year $7.2M contract extension with the Ottawa Senators after being credited with saving the Senators' 2016–17 season by filling in for starter Anderson during which time Condon set team records both for the most consecutive starts by a goalie (27 games) and for the fewest games needed to achieve five shutouts (32 games). In the following 2017–18 season, Condon's play dropped to a save percentage of .902, and he only won five games all season in the backup role to Anderson. However, the abysmal season the Senators had as a whole, in which the team finished second-last in the entire league, heavily contributed to this decline in Condon's performance. Condon suffered a concussion towards the end of the season, ending it early for him.

On October 31, 2018, after two dreadful starts to begin Condon's 2018–19 season, the Senators decided to waive Condon and send him down to their AHL affiliate, the Belleville Senators. Condon was injured with Belleville and spent most of the season on the injured list, only appearing in one game, a 7–6 win against the Toronto Marlies. On July 30, 2019, Condon was traded from the Senators, along with a 6th-round pick in 2020 to the Tampa Bay Lightning in exchange for Ryan Callahan and a 5th-round pick in 2020.

Continuing his rehabilitation from injury, Condon was sidelined to start the 2019–20 season. Assigned to AHL affiliate, the Syracuse Crunch, he appeared in his first game in over a year on December 14, 2019. After six games with the Crunch, Condon was re-assigned to the ECHL for the first time in six years, loaned to the Orlando Solar Bears on February 5, 2020. Condon made four appearances with the Solar Bears before he returned to the AHL, assigned on loan by the Lightning to the Charlotte Checkers, the affiliate to the Carolina Hurricanes on February 26, 2020. Condon made a lone appearance with the Checkers, allowing 4 goals in a 5–3 defeat to the Lehigh Valley Phantoms on February 23, before he was recalled from his loan by the Lightning and returned to the Crunch.

== International play ==
Condon was selected as a member of the United States men's national ice hockey team at the 2016 IIHF World Championship. On May 7, 2016, he started the second game of the tournament leading the United States to a 6–3 win against Belarus, making 20 saves.

== Career statistics ==
=== Regular season and playoffs ===
			Regular season									Playoffs
Season	Team	League	GP	W	L	OTL	MIN	GA	SO	GAA	SV%	GP	W	L	MIN	GA	SO	GAA	SV%
2006–07	Belmont Hill School	HS-MA	5	—	—	—	—	—	—	2.71	.941	—	—	—	—	—	—	—	—
2007–08	Belmont Hill School	HS-MA	31	—	—	—	—	—	—	2.13	.931	—	—	—	—	—	—	—	—
2008–09	Belmont Hill School	HS-MA	31	—	—	—	—	—	—	2.12	.934	—	—	—	—	—	—	—	—
2009–10	Princeton University	ECAC	4	0	1	0	123	5	0	2.44	.902	—	—	—	—	—	—	—	—
2010–11	Princeton University	ECAC	11	6	4	1	660	31	1	2.82	.902	—	—	—	—	—	—	—	—
2011–12	Princeton University	ECAC	14	4	6	3	832	40	0	2.88	.919	—	—	—	—	—	—	—	—
2012–13	Princeton University	ECAC	24	8	11	4	1354	56	2	2.48	.923	—	—	—	—	—	—	—	—
2012–13	Ontario Reign	ECHL	4	3	1	0	243	6	1	1.48	.943	—	—	—	—	—	—	—	—
2012–13	Houston Aeros	AHL	5	3	0	0	226	9	0	2.39	.919	3	1	2	179	11	0	3.69	.909
2013–14	Wheeling Nailers	ECHL	39	23	12	4	2315	84	6	2.18	.931	10	6	3	625	26	2	2.50	.926
2013–14	Hamilton Bulldogs	AHL	3	1	1	0	145	6	0	2.48	.909	—	—	—	—	—	—	—	—
2014–15	Hamilton Bulldogs	AHL	48	23	19	6	2857	116	4	2.44	.921	—	—	—	—	—	—	—	—
2015–16	Montreal Canadiens	NHL	55	21	25	3	3123	141	1	2.71	.903	—	—	—	—	—	—	—	—
2016–17	Pittsburgh Penguins	NHL	1	0	0	0	20	0	0	0.00	1.000	—	—	—	—	—	—	—	—
2016–17	Ottawa Senators	NHL	40	19	14	6	2305	96	5	2.50	.914	2	0	0	61	4	0	3.92	.875
2017–18	Ottawa Senators	NHL	31	5	17	5	1627	88	0	3.25	.902	—	—	—	—	—	—	—	—
2018–19	Ottawa Senators	NHL	2	0	2	0	75	8	0	6.40	.800	—	—	—	—	—	—	—	—
2018–19	Belleville Senators	AHL	1	1	0	0	60	6	0	6.01	.739	—	—	—	—	—	—	—	—
2019–20	Syracuse Crunch	AHL	6	3	2	1	293	20	0	4.10	.877	—	—	—	—	—	—	—	—
2019–20	Orlando Solar Bears	ECHL	4	0	3	0	211	15	0	4.27	.867	—	—	—	—	—	—	—	—
2019–20	Charlotte Checkers	AHL	1	0	1	0	59	4	0	4.09	.789	—	—	—	—	—	—	—	—
NHL totals			129	45	58	17	7,149	333	6	2.79	.905	2	0	0	61	4	0	3.92	.875

=== International ===
Year	Team	Event	Result	GP	W	L	OT	MIN	GA	SO	GAA	SV%
2016	United States	WC	4th	5	2	2	0	259	11	1	2.55	.878
Senior totals				5	2	2	0	259	11	1	2.55	.878
