= Gabriel Dumont (ice hockey) =

Canadian ice hockey player (born 1990)

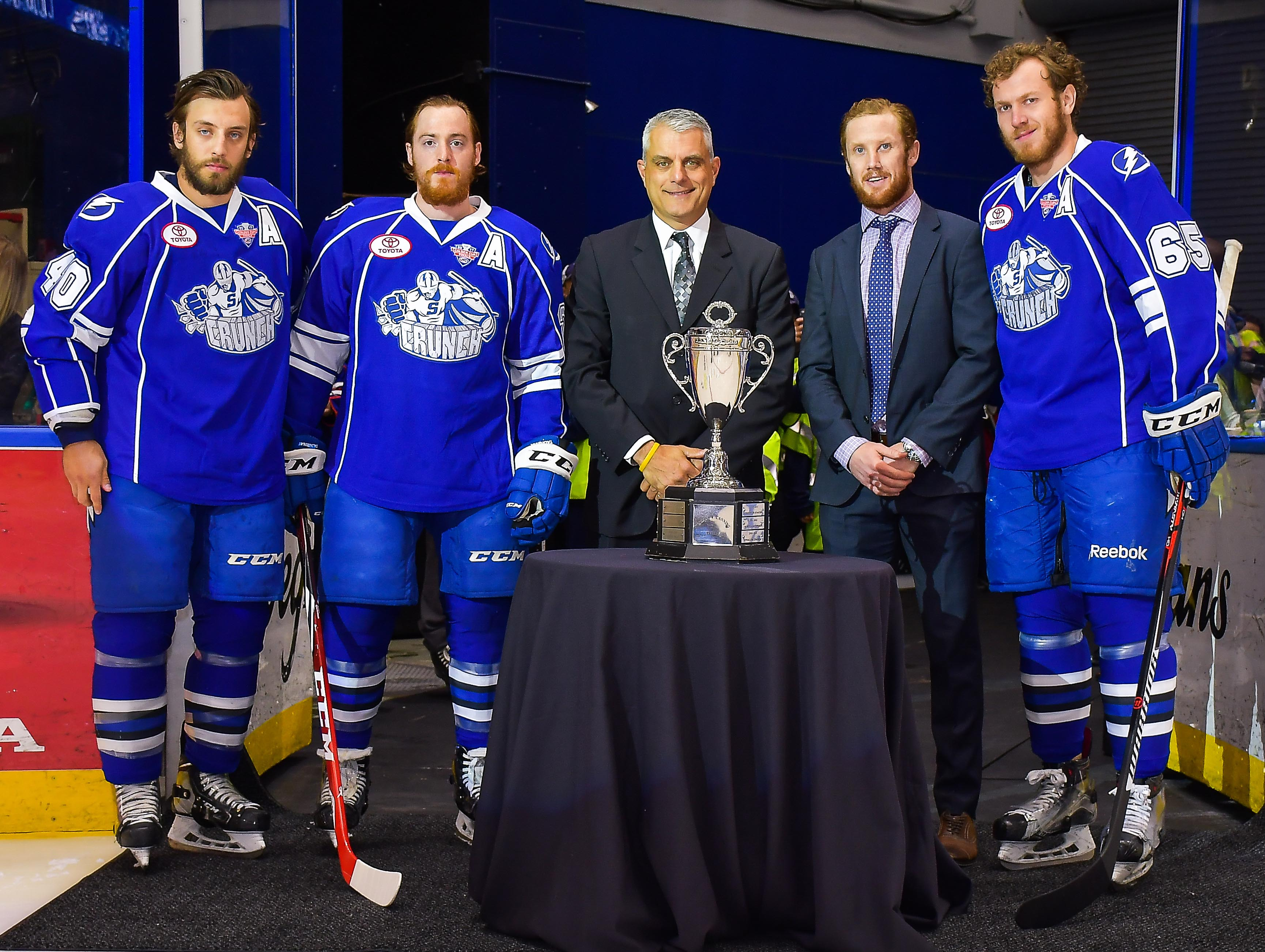
- Dumont with the Syracuse Crunch in 2017
- Born: October 6, 1990 (age 35) Ville Degelis, Quebec, Canada
- Height: 5 ft 10 in (178 cm)
- Weight: 189 lb (86 kg; 13 st 7 lb)
- Position: Centre
- Shot: Right
- Played for: Montreal Canadiens; Tampa Bay Lightning; Ottawa Senators; Minnesota Wild
- NHL draft: 139th overall, 2009; Montreal Canadiens
- Playing career: 2010–2025

Gabriel Paul Joseph Dumont (born October 6, 1990) is a Canadian former professional ice hockey forward. He was selected in the fifth round, 139th overall, by the Montreal Canadiens in the 2009 NHL entry draft. Dumont played for the Canadiens, Minnesota Wild, Ottawa Senators, and Tampa Bay Lightning.

== Playing career ==
=== Early years ===
As a youth, Dumont played in the 2003 and 2004 Quebec International Pee-Wee Hockey Tournaments with minor ice hockey teams from Rimouski.

=== Professional ===
Dumont played four seasons with the Drummondville Voltigeurs in the Quebec Major Junior Hockey League (QMJHL) before he was signed to a three-year, entry-level contract with the Montreal Canadiens on April 30, 2010. He recorded his first career NHL point on March 13, 2013, against the Ottawa Senators and scored his first NHL goal on April 17, 2013, against the Pittsburgh Penguins.

At the conclusion of his entry-level deal, in July 2013, Dumont was re-signed by the Canadiens to a two-year, two-way contract. This was followed by an additional one-year, two-way contract extension on June 1, 2015.

After seven seasons within the Canadiens organization, Dumont left as a free agent to sign a one-year, two-way contract with the Tampa Bay Lightning on July 1, 2016.

On June 28, 2017, the Lightning announced that they had re-signed Dumont to a two-year, $1.3 million contract extension. Dumont made the Lightning's roster to open the 2017–18 season. He would appear in seven games being held pointless before being placed on waivers by the Lightning and claimed by the Ottawa Senators on November 22, 2017. On February 20, 2018, Dumont was placed on waivers by the Senators, and was then claimed by the Lightning the next day.

On July 1, 2019, Dumont signed as a free agent to a two-year, two-way contract with the Minnesota Wild.

At the conclusion of his contract with the Wild, Dumont would return to his former club, the Tampa Bay Lightning, in agreeing to a one-year, two-way contract on July 28, 2021.

On June 9, 2022, Dumont signed a two-year contract with the Syracuse Crunch of the American Hockey League (AHL) to remain within the Lightning organization. This was followed by a one-year extension with the team in June 2024.

On June 19, 2025, Dumont announced his retirement from professional hockey after 16 seasons, at age 34.

== Career statistics ==
			Regular season					Playoffs
Season	Team	League	GP	G	A	Pts	PIM	GP	G	A	Pts	PIM
2006–07	Drummondville Voltigeurs	QMJHL	8	1	1	2	6	6	0	2	2	0
2007–08	Drummondville Voltigeurs	QMJHL	59	11	14	25	103	—	—	—	—	—
2008–09	Drummondville Voltigeurs	QMJHL	51	28	21	49	63	19	6	13	19	32
2009–10	Drummondville Voltigeurs	QMJHL	62	51	42	93	127	14	11	10	21	19
2009–10	Hamilton Bulldogs	AHL	—	—	—	—	—	11	2	0	2	12
2010–11	Hamilton Bulldogs	AHL	64	5	13	18	79	20	6	3	9	6
2011–12	Hamilton Bulldogs	AHL	59	13	11	24	55	—	—	—	—	—
2011–12	Montreal Canadiens	NHL	3	0	0	0	0	—	—	—	—	—
2012–13	Hamilton Bulldogs	AHL	55	16	15	31	83	—	—	—	—	—
2012–13	Montreal Canadiens	NHL	10	1	2	3	13	3	0	0	0	12
2013–14	Hamilton Bulldogs	AHL	74	19	17	36	111	—	—	—	—	—
2013–14	Montreal Canadiens	NHL	2	0	0	0	0	—	—	—	—	—
2014–15	Hamilton Bulldogs	AHL	66	20	25	45	88	—	—	—	—	—
2014–15	Montreal Canadiens	NHL	3	0	0	0	0	—	—	—	—	—
2015–16	St. John's IceCaps	AHL	71	19	30	49	76	—	—	—	—	—
2016–17	Syracuse Crunch	AHL	20	5	5	10	24	22	5	6	11	12
2016–17	Tampa Bay Lightning	NHL	39	2	2	4	29	—	—	—	—	—
2017–18	Tampa Bay Lightning	NHL	7	0	0	0	4	—	—	—	—	—
2017–18	Ottawa Senators	NHL	23	1	1	2	2	—	—	—	—	—
2017–18	Syracuse Crunch	AHL	18	5	16	21	15	4	3	2	5	2
2018–19	Syracuse Crunch	AHL	59	15	28	43	67	4	0	0	0	4
2019–20	Iowa Wild	AHL	34	7	8	15	38	—	—	—	—	—
2019–20	Minnesota Wild	NHL	3	0	0	0	0	—	—	—	—	—
2020–21	Iowa Wild	AHL	34	12	19	31	60	—	—	—	—	—
2021–22	Syracuse Crunch	AHL	75	30	32	62	100	5	0	2	2	4
2022–23	Syracuse Crunch	AHL	55	18	21	39	42	3	1	1	2	15
2023–24	Syracuse Crunch	AHL	47	14	14	28	53	—	—	—	—	—
2024–25	Syracuse Crunch	AHL	16	3	4	7	8	3	0	0	0	0
NHL totals			90	4	5	9	48	3	0	0	0	12

== Awards and honours ==
Award	Year	Ref
QMJHL
President's Cup champion	2009	
Guy Carbonneau Trophy	2010	
First All-Star Team	2010	
CHL
Second All-Star Team	2010	
AHL
All-Star Game	2013, 2023	
