= Antti Niemi (ice hockey) =

Finnish ice hockey player (born 1983)

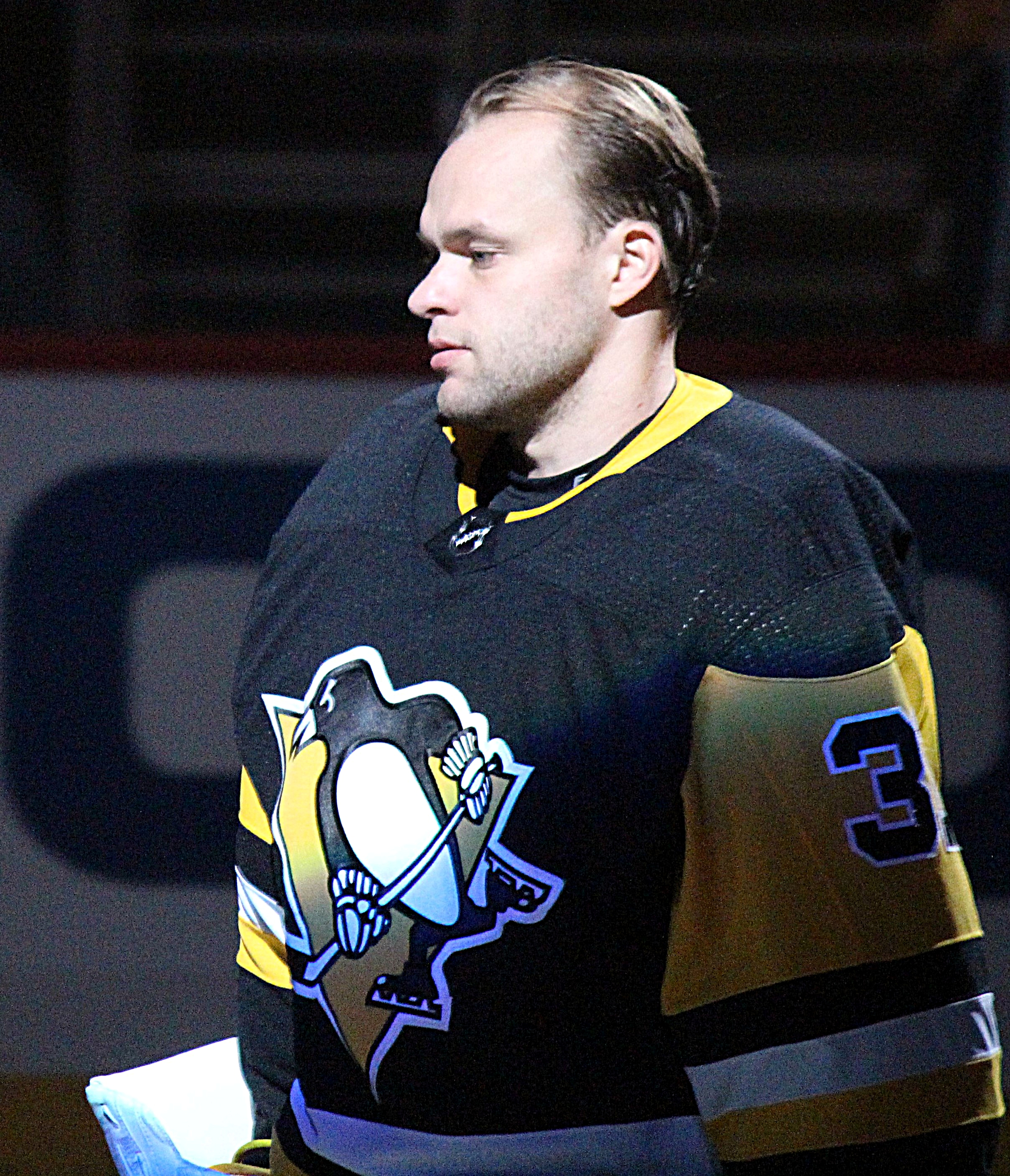
- Niemi with the Pittsburgh Penguins in October 2017
- Born: 29 August 1983 (age 42) Vantaa, Finland
- Height: 6 ft 2 in (188 cm)
- Weight: 210 lb (95 kg; 15 st 0 lb)
- Position: Goaltender
- Caught: Left
- Played for: Lahti Pelicans; Chicago Blackhawks; San Jose Sharks; Dallas Stars; Pittsburgh Penguins; Florida Panthers; Montreal Canadiens; Jokerit
- National team: Finland
- NHL draft: Undrafted
- Playing career: 2005–2020

Antti Niemi (Finnish pronunciation: [ˈɑntːi ˈnie̯mi]; born 29 August 1983) is a Finnish former professional ice hockey goaltender. During the 2009–10 season as a member of the Chicago Blackhawks, he became the first Finnish goaltender to win the Stanley Cup, and has also played for the San Jose Sharks, Dallas Stars, Pittsburgh Penguins, Florida Panthers, and Montreal Canadiens.

== Playing career ==
=== Early years ===
Niemi played junior-level hockey for Kiekko-Vantaa from 1998 until 2005, where he also worked part-time as a Zamboni driver and later had his number retired. He turned pro with the Pelicans of the Finnish SM-liiga in 2005, playing three seasons with the team. In November 2007, Niemi debuted for the Finnish national team. He then signed with the Chicago Blackhawks of the National Hockey League (NHL) as an undrafted free agent on 5 May 2008. Dale Tallon, then the Blackhawks general manager, lauded him as one of the top European goaltending prospects and praised his size and athleticism. He was assigned to Chicago's minor league affiliate, the Rockford IceHogs, Niemi spent the majority of the 2008–09 season in the American Hockey League (AHL), alternating starts with Corey Crawford. In February 2009, he was called up to the Blackhawks as an injury replacement. He made his NHL debut on 27 February, playing one period in a 5–4 overtime loss to the Pittsburgh Penguins. Niemi recorded his first NHL start and win several days later on 1 March, a 4–2 victory versus the Los Angeles Kings. Niemi finished the season with an 18–14–3 record with a 2.43 GAA and .913 save percentage for the IceHogs.

=== Stanley Cup season with Chicago ===
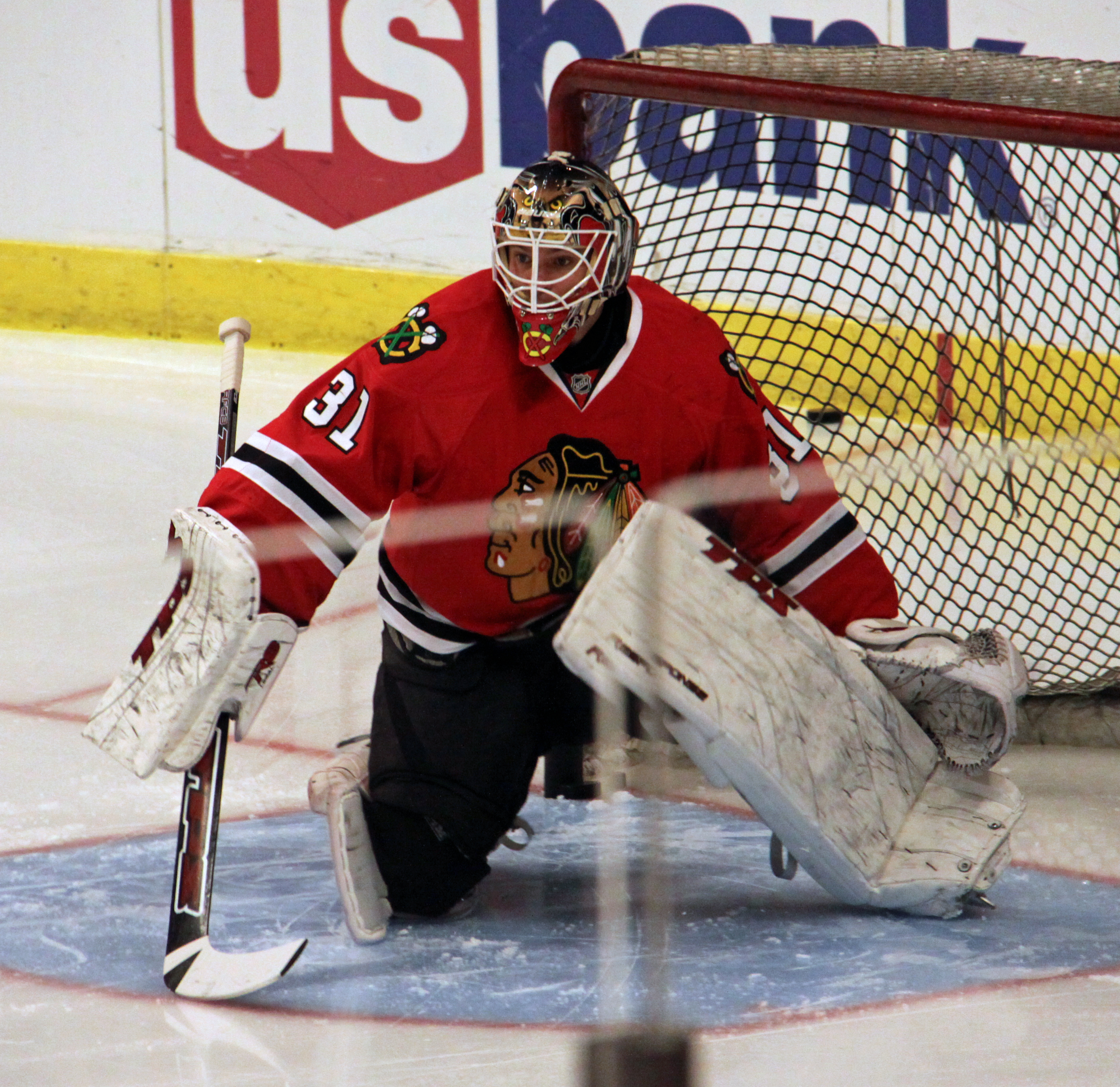
Niemi with the Blackhawks in April 2010

The following season, Niemi made the Blackhawks lineup out of training camp. The Blackhawks began their season with a back-to-back season opening series against the Florida Panthers, held in Niemi's native Finland in the city of Helsinki. Niemi started the second game, held on 3 October 2009, where he stopped all 23 shots he faced against the Panthers to earn his first NHL shutout.

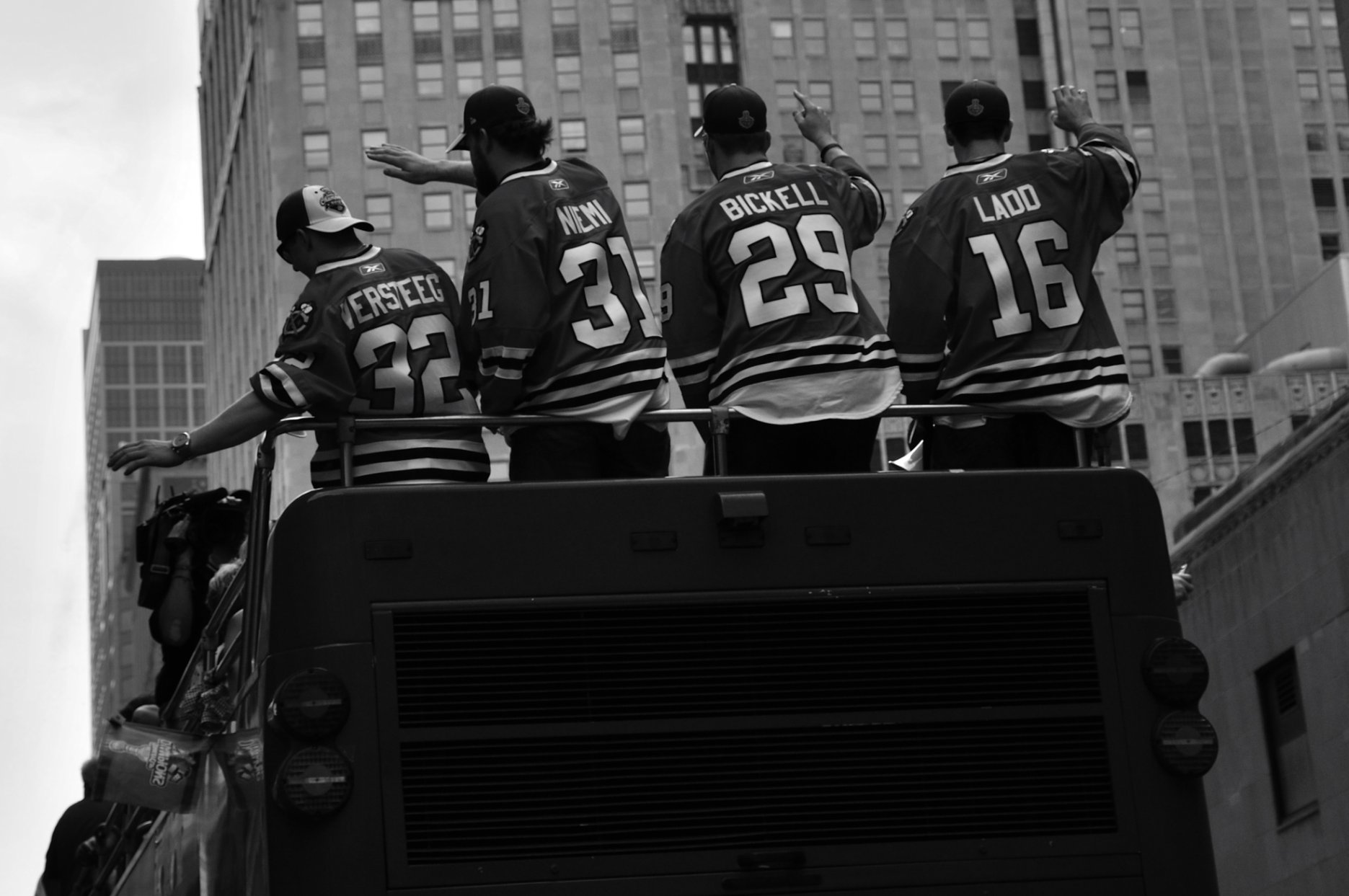
Niemi in June 2010 with Andrew Ladd, Bryan Bickell and Kris Versteeg at the 2010 Stanley Cup championship parade

Niemi compiled 26–7–4 record during the regular season and replaced Cristobal Huet as the team's starting goaltender. During game two of the opening series, Niemi recorded a shutout victory against the Nashville Predators at United Center, making him the first Blackhawks goaltender since Ed Belfour in 1996 to record a post-season shutout.

On 22 April 2010, Niemi stopped 33 shots to record his second shutout of the post-season, making him the first Chicago goaltender since Tony Esposito in 1974 to record two shutouts in one playoff series. On 16 May 2010, Niemi made 44 saves in a 2–1 victory over the San Jose Sharks in game one of the Western Conference Final. Chicago ended up sweeping the series against San Jose in four games.

Niemi made 32 saves in his second Stanley Cup Final game and earned the Player of the Game honors from the NHL. On 9 June 2010, Niemi led the Blackhawks to a Stanley Cup championship with a 4–3 overtime win over the Philadelphia Flyers. Niemi is the first Finnish-born goaltender to win the Cup.

Niemi filed for arbitration during the off-season, and was eventually awarded $2.75 million. Chicago walked away from the deal on 2 August due to salary cap restraints and signed veteran goaltender Marty Turco from the Dallas Stars for $1.3 million.

=== San Jose Sharks ===
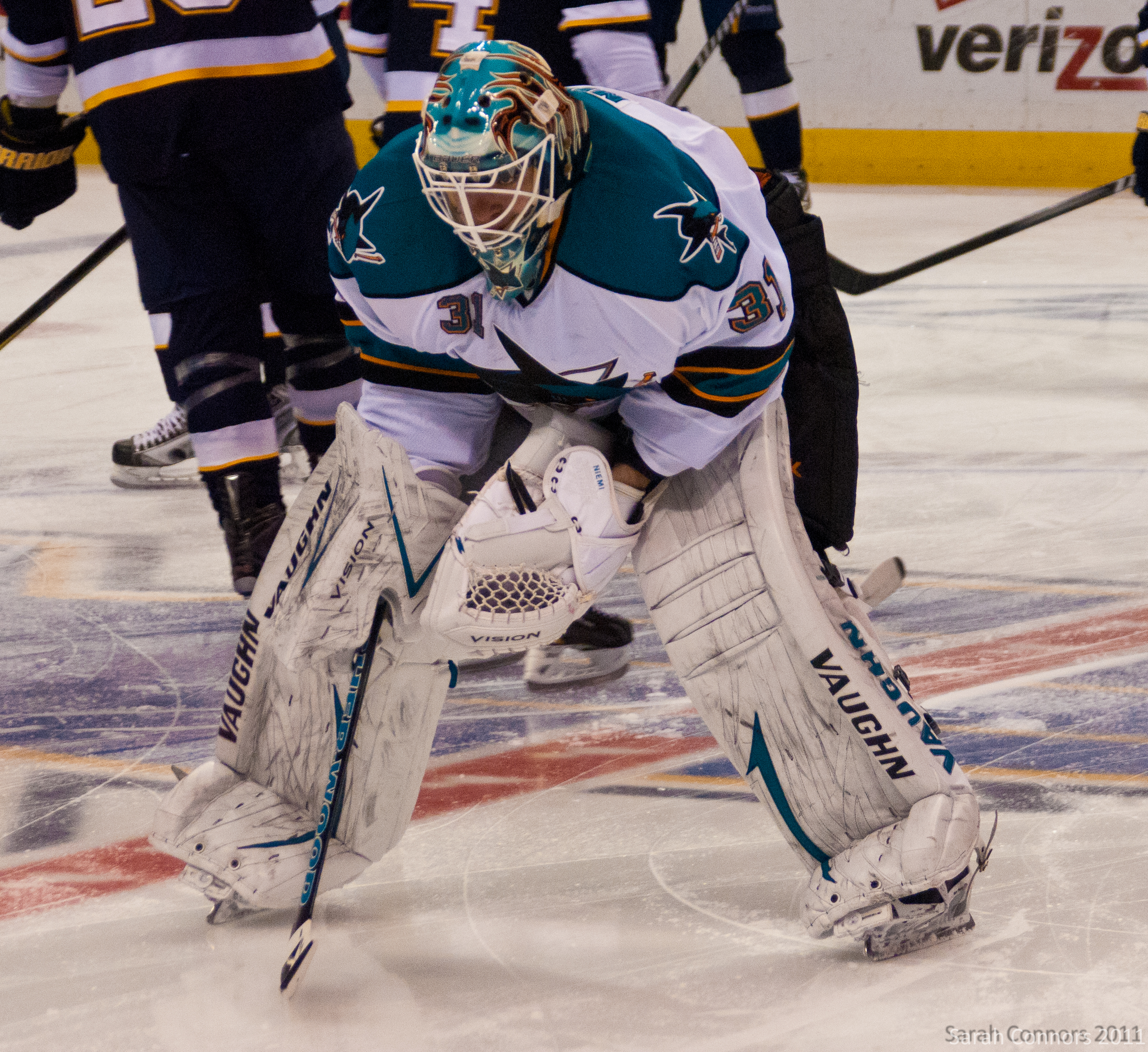
Niemi with the Sharks in December 2011

On 2 September 2010, Niemi officially signed a one-year, $2 million contract with the San Jose Sharks. He made 30 saves in his first regular season victory with the Sharks, a 3–2 win over the Columbus Blue Jackets. After a poor start to the season, Niemi was platooned with fellow Finnish netminder Antero Niittymäki, but strong play in the month of February, which saw him go 14–2–1 with a 1.91 goals against average (GAA) and .924 save percentage, cemented him as the Sharks' starting goaltender. On 1 March 2011, Niemi signed a four-year contract extension with San Jose worth $15.2 million. His nickname with the Sharks was "Nemo."

In October 2012, Niemi signed a one-month contract with Pelicans in Finland during the 2012–13 NHL lockout. In the 2012–13 season, Niemi led the Sharks in GAA with 2.16, while leading the NHL in minutes played with 2,581, tied for the League lead with 24 wins in 43 starts, along with finishing third in the NHL with 1,127 saves. On 8 May 2013, Niemi was nominated for the Vezina Trophy, but ultimately lost out to Sergei Bobrovsky of the Columbus Blue Jackets. With his prowess in the shootout throughout the season The Hockey News awarded Niemi the Gilles Villemure Award as the Best Shootout Goalie.

=== Dallas Stars ===
On 27 June 2015, the second day of the 2015 NHL entry draft, Niemi's rights were traded to the Dallas Stars in exchange for the 193rd pick in the 2015 draft. The Stars signed Niemi, forming a partnership with fellow Finnish starting goaltender Kari Lehtonen, on a three-year deal worth $13.5 million on 29 June. On 8 October 2015, Niemi started the first game of the season for the Dallas Stars instead of longtime starter Lehtonen, posting a 37 save shutout and picking up two assists in the 3–0 Dallas Stars victory over the Pittsburgh Penguins. Niemi and Lehtonen would alternate regularly for the entire season. In the playoffs, Lehtonen was given the first chance as the starting goaltender before Niemi started a few games as well.

Niemi would continue to alternate with Lehtonen to begin his second season with the Stars in the 2016–17 season. However, Niemi struggled mightily and was relegated to the backup role. Despite winning 12 games, Niemi placed last in the league amongst recorded goaltenders in goals against average and second to last in save percentage. With the Stars missing the post-season and with the acquisition of goaltender Ben Bishop, Niemi was placed on waivers to be bought out from the remaining year of his contract on 26 June 2017.

=== Pittsburgh Penguins and Florida Panthers ===
On 1 July 2017, Niemi signed a one-year contract with the Pittsburgh Penguins worth $700,000 for the 2017–18 season. Niemi started three games for the Penguins, during which he allowed 16 goals and recorded a 7.5 goals against average. He was placed on waivers on 23 October.

On 24 October, Niemi was claimed off waivers by the Florida Panthers after being waived the previous day. After featuring in just two winless games with the Panthers, and with the return to health of Roberto Luongo, he was placed on waivers once again on 13 November.

=== Montreal Canadiens ===
On 14 November, Niemi was claimed off waivers by the Montreal Canadiens, and became their official backup on 4 January 2018 after the team traded Al Montoya to the Edmonton Oilers.

Niemi posted a 7–5–4 record and a .929 save percentage in 19 total games with the Canadiens. This career resurgence earned him the Montreal chapter of the Professional Hockey Writers' Association's nomination for the Bill Masterton Memorial Trophy and a one-year, $950,000 contract extension with the Canadiens. On 15 January 2019, Niemi set a franchise record for most saves in a regular season home game, stopping 52 shots in a 5–1 win over the Panthers, besting the previous mark of 49 saves shared by Jeff Hackett and Carey Price.

=== Jokerit ===
As an impending free agent from the Canadiens following the 2018–19 season, Niemi ended his 11-year NHL career, returning to Finland in signing a one-year contract with Jokerit of the Kontinental Hockey League (KHL) on 5 June 2019.

== International play ==
Medal record

Ice hockey

Representing Finland

Olympic Games
Bronze medal – third place	2014 Sochi	

Niemi won a bronze medal at the 2014 Winter Olympics. He dressed as the backup goaltender for four of Finland's six games, but he did not see any ice time.

== Career statistics ==
=== Regular season and playoffs ===
			Regular season									Playoffs
Season	Team	League	GP	W	L	T/OT	MIN	GA	SO	GAA	SV%	GP	W	L	MIN	GA	SO	GAA	SV%
2000–01	Kiekko-Vantaa	Jr. A	4	—	—	—	—	—	—	6.86	.836	—	—	—	—	—	—	—	—
2002–03	Kiekko-Vantaa	Jr. B	—	—	—	—	—	—	—	—	—	10	—	—	—	—	—	2.39	.933
2002–03	Kiekko-Vantaa	Mestis	6	—	—	—	—	—	—	2.63	.899	—	—	—	—	—	—	—	—
2003–04	Kiekko-Vantaa	Jr. A	9	—	—	—	—	—	—	4.12	.894	—	—	—	—	—	—	—	—
2003–04	Kiekko-Vantaa	Jr. B	8	—	—	—	—	—	—	2.19	.930	2	—	—	—	—	—	3.00	.914
2003–04	Kiekko-Vantaa	Mestis	19	—	—	—	—	—	—	2.69	.910	5	—	—	—	—	—	2.98	.908
2004–05	Kiekko-Vantaa	Mestis	38	—	—	—	2,262	95	—	2.52	.919	3	—	—	187	13	—	4.17	.907
2005–06	Lahti Pelicans	SM-l	40	12	17	8	2,263	103	3	2.73	.916	—	—	—	—	—	—	—	—
2006–07	Lahti Pelicans	SM-l	48	18	21	7	2,780	119	3	2.57	.918	6	2	4	370	9	1	1.46	.951
2007–08	Lahti Pelicans	SM-l	49	26	14	6	2,791	109	4	2.35	.926	6	2	4	328	21	0	3.83	.883
2008–09	Rockford IceHogs	AHL	38	18	14	3	2,095	85	2	2.43	.910	2	0	2	115	7	0	3.65	.897
2008–09	Chicago Blackhawks	NHL	3	1	1	1	141	8	0	3.40	.864	—	—	—	—	—	—	—	—
2009–10	Chicago Blackhawks	NHL	39	26	7	4	2,190	82	7	2.25	.912	22	16	6	1,322	58	2	2.63	.910
2010–11	San Jose Sharks	NHL	60	35	18	6	3,524	140	6	2.38	.920	18	8	9	1,044	56	0	3.22	.896
2011–12	San Jose Sharks	NHL	68	34	22	9	3,936	159	6	2.42	.915	5	1	4	318	13	0	2.45	.914
2012–13	San Jose Sharks	NHL	43	24	12	6	2,581	93	4	2.16	.924	11	7	4	673	21	0	1.87	.930
2013–14	San Jose Sharks	NHL	64	39	17	7	3,740	149	4	2.39	.913	6	3	3	305	19	0	3.74	.884
2014–15	San Jose Sharks	NHL	61	31	23	7	3,587	155	5	2.59	.914	—	—	—	—	—	—	—	—
2015–16	Dallas Stars	NHL	48	25	13	7	2,655	118	3	2.67	.905	5	1	3	238	13	0	3.29	.865
2016–17	Dallas Stars	NHL	37	12	12	4	1,729	95	0	3.30	.892	—	—	—	—	—	—	—	—
2017–18	Pittsburgh Penguins	NHL	3	0	3	0	129	16	0	7.50	.797	—	—	—	—	—	—	—	—
2017–18	Florida Panthers	NHL	2	0	1	0	59	5	0	5.08	.853	—	—	—	—	—	—	—	—
2017–18	Montreal Canadiens	NHL	19	7	9	4	1,214	42	1	2.46	.929	—	—	—	—	—	—	—	—
2018–19	Montreal Canadiens	NHL	17	8	6	2	969	61	0	3.78	.887	—	—	—	—	—	—	—	—
2019–20	Jokerit	KHL	19	3	12	4	1084	58	1	3.21	.883	1	1	0	60	0	1	0.00	1.000
Liiga totals			137	56	52	21	7,834	331	10	2.55	.899	12	4	8	698	30	1	2.50	.917
NHL totals			464	242	140	57	26,266	1,123	36	2.57	.912	67	36	29	3,899	180	2	2.77	.905

=== International ===
Year	Team	Event	GP	W	L	MIN	GA	SO	GAA	SV%
2014	Finland	OG	DNP	—	—	—	—	—	—	—

== Awards and honours ==
Award	Year
NHL
Stanley Cup champion	2010
