= List of 2017–18 NHL Three Star Awards =

The 2017–18 NHL Three Star Awards are the way the National Hockey League denotes its players of the week and players of the month of the 2017–18 season.

== Weekly ==
Weekly
Week	First Star	Second Star	Third Star
October 8, 2017	Alexander Ovechkin (Washington Capitals)	Marc-Andre Fleury (Vegas Golden Knights)	Wayne Simmonds (Philadelphia Flyers)
October 15, 2017	Nikolaj Ehlers (Winnipeg Jets)	Auston Matthews (Toronto Maple Leafs)	Nicklas Backstrom (Washington Capitals)
October 22, 2017	Steven Stamkos (Tampa Bay Lightning)	Nikita Kucherov (Tampa Bay Lightning)	Logan Couture (San Jose Sharks)
October 29, 2017	John Tavares (New York Islanders)	Oscar Dansk (Vegas Golden Knights)	Jean-Gabriel Pageau (Ottawa Senators)
November 5, 2017	Corey Crawford (Chicago Blackhawks)	Josh Bailey (New York Islanders)	Martin Jones (San Jose Sharks)
November 12, 2017	Jason Zucker (Minnesota Wild)	Nikita Kucherov (Tampa Bay Lightning)	Braden Holtby (Washington Capitals)
November 19, 2017	Teuvo Teravainen (Carolina Hurricanes)	Frederik Andersen (Toronto Maple Leafs)	Nathan MacKinnon (Colorado Avalanche)
November 26, 2017	Jonathan Marchessault (Vegas Golden Knights)	Sergei Bobrovsky (Columbus Blue Jackets)	Alexander Ovechkin (Washington Capitals)
December 3, 2017	Blake Wheeler (Winnipeg Jets)	Carey Price (Montreal Canadiens)	Radek Faksa (Dallas Stars)
December 10, 2017	Brayden Schenn (St. Louis Blues)	Jake Allen (St. Louis Blues)	Brian Elliott (Philadelphia Flyers)
December 17, 2017	Patrick Kane (Chicago Blackhawks)	Brian Elliott (Philadelphia Flyers)	Josh Bailey (New York Islanders)
December 24, 2017	Tuukka Rask (Boston Bruins)	Mathew Barzal (New York Islanders)	James Reimer (Florida Panthers)
December 31, 2017	Connor Hellebuyck (Winnipeg Jets)	William Karlsson (Vegas Golden Knights)	David Backes (Boston Bruins)
January 7, 2018	Patrice Bergeron (Boston Bruins)	Jonathan Bernier (Colorado Avalanche)	Sidney Crosby (Pittsburgh Penguins)
January 14, 2018	Johnny Gaudreau (Calgary Flames)	Mike Smith (Calgary Flames)	Phil Kessel (Pittsburgh Penguins)
January 21, 2018	Nathan MacKinnon (Colorado Avalanche)	Connor Hellebuyck (Winnipeg Jets)	Brad Marchand (Boston Bruins)
January 28, 2018	Brock Boeser (Vancouver Canucks)	Jack Eichel (Buffalo Sabres)	Robin Lehner (Buffalo Sabres)
February 4, 2018	Evgeni Malkin (Pittsburgh Penguins)	Harri Sateri (Florida Panthers)	Reilly Smith (Vegas Golden Knights)
February 11, 2018	Claude Giroux (Philadelphia Flyers)	Johnny Gaudreau (Calgary Flames)	Devan Dubnyk (Minnesota Wild)
February 18, 2018	Nico Hischier (New Jersey Devils)	Antti Raanta (Arizona Coyotes)	Mark Scheifele (Winnipeg Jets)
February 25, 2018	Eric Staal (Minnesota Wild)	Pekka Rinne (Nashville Predators)	Ryan Getzlaf (Anaheim Ducks)
March 4, 2018	Nathan MacKinnon (Colorado Avalanche)	Patrik Laine (Winnipeg Jets)	Aleksander Barkov (Florida Panthers)
March 11, 2018	Patrik Laine (Winnipeg Jets)	Brad Marchand (Boston Bruins)	Evgeni Malkin (Pittsburgh Penguins)
March 18, 2018	Alex Pietrangelo (St. Louis Blues)	Nathan MacKinnon (Colorado Avalanche)	Curtis McElhinney (Toronto Maple Leafs)
March 25, 2018	Connor McDavid (Edmonton Oilers)	Jake Allen (St. Louis Blues)	Kyle Connor (Winnipeg Jets)
April 1, 2018	William Karlsson (Vegas Golden Knights)	Antti Raanta (Arizona Coyotes)	Jack Eichel (Buffalo Sabres)
April 8, 2018	Jamie Benn (Dallas Stars)	Roberto Luongo (Florida Panthers)	Claude Giroux (Philadelphia Flyers)

== Monthly ==
Monthly
Month	First Star	Second Star	Third Star
October	Steven Stamkos (Tampa Bay Lightning)	Nikita Kucherov (Tampa Bay Lightning)	Jaden Schwartz (St. Louis Blues)
November	Nathan MacKinnon (Colorado Avalanche)	Frederik Andersen (Toronto Maple Leafs)	Brayden Schenn (St. Louis Blues)
December	Tuukka Rask (Boston Bruins)	Josh Bailey (New York Islanders)	Nikita Kucherov (Tampa Bay Lightning)
January	Evgeni Malkin (Pittsburgh Penguins)	Patrice Bergeron (Boston Bruins)	Jonathan Bernier (Colorado Avalanche)
February	Eric Staal (Minnesota Wild)	Evgeni Malkin (Pittsburgh Penguins)	Reilly Smith (Vegas Golden Knights)
March	Connor McDavid (Edmonton Oilers)	Brad Marchand (Boston Bruins)	John Gibson (Anaheim Ducks)

== Rookie of the Month ==
Rookie of the Month
Month	Player
October	Clayton Keller (Arizona Coyotes)
November	Brock Boeser (Vancouver Canucks)
December	Brock Boeser (Vancouver Canucks)
January	Mathew Barzal (New York Islanders)
February	Yanni Gourde (Tampa Bay Lightning)
March	Clayton Keller (Arizona Coyotes)
