= 2017–18 New York Rangers season =

National Hockey League season

2017–18 New York Rangers
- Division: 8th Metropolitan
- Conference: 12th Eastern
- 2017–18 record: 34–39–9
- Home record: 21–16–4
- Road record: 13–23–5
- Goals for: 231
- Goals against: 268

Team information
- General manager: Jeff Gorton
- Coach: Alain Vigneault
- Captain: Ryan McDonagh (Oct.–Feb.); Vacant (Feb.–Apr.)
- Alternate captains: Jesper Fast (Feb.); Chris Kreider (Mar.–Apr.); Rick Nash (Oct.–Feb.); Marc Staal; Mats Zuccarello
- Arena: Madison Square Garden
- Average attendance: 17,851
- Minor league affiliates: Hartford Wolf Pack (AHL); Greenville Swamp Rabbits (ECHL)

Team leaders
- Goals: Mika Zibanejad (27)
- Assists: Mats Zuccarello (37)
- Points: Mats Zuccarello (53)
- Penalty minutes: Chris Kreider; Kevin Shattenkirk (44)
- Plus/minus: Marc Staal (+11)
- Wins: Henrik Lundqvist (26)
- Goals against average: Henrik Lundqvist (2.98)

The 2017–18 New York Rangers season was the franchise's 91st season of play and their 92nd season overall. This season saw the Rangers struggle with inconsistency for much of the season, with the team going 4–7–2 in October. Despite going 9–3–0 in November, the team's struggles would be amplified in later months with injuries to Mika Zibanejad, Chris Kreider and Kevin Shattenkirk, the latter of whom had season-ending knee surgery. After winning the 2018 Winter Classic over the Buffalo Sabres, the team would go 6–16–2 up to the trade deadline. On February 8, the Rangers announced their intention to rebuild, and then weeks later traded away many key players such as Ryan McDonagh, Rick Nash, J. T. Miller, Nick Holden, and Michael Grabner. They also acquired Rob O'Gara, Vladislav Namestnikov and Ryan Spooner. The Rangers ultimately missed the playoffs for the first time since the 2009–10 season, placed last in the Metropolitan Division and finished under .500 for the first time since the 2003–04 season. At the conclusion of the 2017–18 season, head coach Alain Vigneault was fired by the team.

== Standings ==
=== Divisional standings ===
Metropolitan Division
Pos	Team	GP	W	L	OTL	ROW	GF	GA	GD	Pts
1	y – Washington Capitals	82	49	26	7	46	259	239	+20	105
2	x – Pittsburgh Penguins	82	47	29	6	45	272	250	+22	100
3	x – Philadelphia Flyers	82	42	26	14	40	251	243	+8	98
4	x – Columbus Blue Jackets	82	45	30	7	39	242	230	+12	97
5	x – New Jersey Devils	82	44	29	9	39	248	244	+4	97
6	Carolina Hurricanes	82	36	35	11	33	228	256	−28	83
7	New York Islanders	82	35	37	10	32	264	296	−32	80
8	New York Rangers	82	34	39	9	31	231	268	−37	77

Source: National Hockey League
x – Clinched playoff spot; y – Clinched division

=== Conference standings ===
Eastern Conference Wild Card
Pos	Div	Team	GP	W	L	OTL	ROW	GF	GA	GD	Pts
1	ME	x – Columbus Blue Jackets	82	45	30	7	39	242	230	+12	97
2	ME	x – New Jersey Devils	82	44	29	9	39	248	244	+4	97
3	AT	Florida Panthers	82	44	30	8	41	248	246	+2	96
4	ME	Carolina Hurricanes	82	36	35	11	33	228	256	−28	83
5	ME	New York Islanders	82	35	37	10	32	264	296	−32	80
6	ME	New York Rangers	82	34	39	9	31	231	268	−37	77
7	AT	Detroit Red Wings	82	30	39	13	25	217	255	−38	73
8	AT	Montreal Canadiens	82	29	40	13	27	209	264	−55	71
9	AT	Ottawa Senators	82	28	43	11	26	221	291	−70	67
10	AT	Buffalo Sabres	82	25	45	12	24	199	280	−81	62

Source: National Hockey League
x – Clinched playoff spot

== Schedule and results ==
=== Pre-season ===
The team's pre-season schedule was revealed on June 13, 2017.

2017 pre-season game log: 3–2–1 (Home: 3–0–0; Road: 0–2–1)

Game	Date	Opponent	Score	Record
1	September 18	New York Islanders	1–0 OT	1–0–0
2	September 20	New Jersey Devils	4–3 OT	2–0–0
3	September 22	@ New York Islanders	1–2	2–1–0
4	September 23	@ New Jersey Devils	1–2	2–2–0
5	September 25	Philadelphia Flyers	3–2 OT	3–2–0
6	September 26	@ Philadelphia Flyers	3–4 OT	3–2–1

=== Regular season ===
The regular season schedule was made public on June 22, 2017.

2017–18 game log
October: 4–7–2, 10 points (Home: 4–4–2; Road: 0–3–0)

Game	Date	Opponent	Score	OT	Decision	Location	Attendance	Record	Points	Recap
1	October 5	Colorado	2–4		Lundqvist	Madison Square Garden	18,006	0–1–0	0	Recap
2	October 7	@ Toronto	5–8		Pavelec	Air Canada Centre	19,621	0–2–0	0	Recap
3	October 8	Montreal	2–0		Lundqvist	Madison Square Garden	18,006	1–2–0	2	Recap
4	October 10	St. Louis	1–3		Lundqvist	Madison Square Garden	18,006	1–3–0	2	Recap
5	October 13	@ Columbus	1–3		Lundqvist	Nationwide Arena	15,342	1–4–0	2	Recap
6	October 14	New Jersey	2–3		Pavelec	Madison Square Garden	18,006	1–5–0	2	Recap
7	October 17	Pittsburgh	4–5	OT	Lundqvist	Madison Square Garden	18,006	1–5–1	3	Recap
8	October 19	NY Islanders	3–4	SO	Lundqvist	Madison Square Garden	18,006	1–5–2	4	Recap
9	October 21	Nashville	4–2		Lundqvist	Madison Square Garden	17,181	2–5–2	6	Recap
10	October 23	San Jose	1–4		Lundqvist	Madison Square Garden	18,006	2–6–2	6	Recap
11	October 26	Arizona	5–2		Pavelec	Madison Square Garden	18,006	3–6–2	8	Recap
12	October 28	@ Montreal	4–5		Pavelec	Bell Centre	21,302	3–7–2	8	Recap
13	October 31	Vegas	6–4		Lundqvist	Madison Square Garden	17,294	4–7–2	10	Recap

November: 9–3–0, 18 points (Home: 6–1–0; Road: 3–2–0)

Game	Date	Opponent	Score	OT	Decision	Location	Attendance	Record	Points	Recap
14	November 2	@ Tampa Bay	2–1	OT	Lundqvist	Amalie Arena	19,092	5–7–2	12	Recap
15	November 4	@ Florida	5–4	OT	Lundqvist	BB&T Center	15,036	6–7–2	14	Recap
16	November 6	Columbus	5–3		Lundqvist	Madison Square Garden	17,348	7–7–2	16	Recap
17	November 8	Boston	4–2		Lundqvist	Madison Square Garden	18,006	8–7–2	18	Recap
18	November 11	Edmonton	4–2		Lundqvist	Madison Square Garden	18,006	9–7–2	20	Recap
19	November 15	@ Chicago	3–6		Lundqvist	United Center	21,528	9–8–2	20	Recap
20	November 17	@ Columbus	0–2		Lundqvist	Nationwide Arena	17,093	9–9–2	20	Recap
21	November 19	Ottawa	3–0		Lundqvist	Madison Square Garden	17,524	10–9–2	22	Recap
22	November 22	@ Carolina	6–1		Lundqvist	PNC Arena	11,398	11–9–2	24	Recap
23	November 24	Detroit	2–1	OT	Lundqvist	Madison Square Garden	18,006	12–9–2	26	Recap
24	November 26	Vancouver	4–3	SO	Lundqvist	Madison Square Garden	17,632	13–9–2	28	Recap
25	November 28	Florida	4–5		Lundqvist	Madison Square Garden	17,376	13–10–2	28	Recap

December: 7–3–3, 17 points (Home: 5–1–1; Road: 2–2–2)

Game	Date	Opponent	Score	OT	Decision	Location	Attendance	Record	Points	Recap
26	December 1	Carolina	5–1		Lundqvist	Madison Square Garden	17,695	14–10–2	30	Recap
27	December 5	@ Pittsburgh	4–3		Pavelec	PPG Paints Arena	18,414	15–10–2	32	Recap
28	December 8	@ Washington	2–4		Lundqvist	Capital One Arena	18,506	15–11–2	32	Recap
29	December 9	New Jersey	5–2		Lundqvist	Madison Square Garden	18,006	16–11–2	34	Recap
30	December 11	Dallas	1–2	SO	Pavelec	Madison Square Garden	17,667	16–11–3	35	Recap
31	December 13	@ Ottawa	2–3		Lundqvist	Canadian Tire Centre	13,212	16–12–3	35	Recap
32	December 15	Los Angeles	4–2		Lundqvist	Madison Square Garden	17,756	17–12–3	37	Recap
33	December 16	@ Boston	3–2	OT	Lundqvist	TD Garden	17,565	18–12–3	39	Recap
34	December 19	Anaheim	4–1		Lundqvist	Madison Square Garden	18,006	19–12–3	41	Recap
35	December 21	@ New Jersey	3–4	SO	Lundqvist	Prudential Center	16,514	19–12–4	42	Recap
36	December 23	Toronto	2–3		Lundqvist	Madison Square Garden	18,006	19–13–4	42	Recap
37	December 27	Washington	1–0	SO	Pavelec	Madison Square Garden	18,006	20–13–4	44	Recap
38	December 29	@ Detroit	2–3	SO	Lundqvist	Little Caesars Arena	19,515	20–13–5	45	Recap

January: 5–7–0, 10 points (Home: 2–2–0; Road: 3–5–0)

Game	Date	Opponent	Score	OT	Decision	Location	Attendance	Record	Points	Recap
39	January 1	@ Buffalo	3–2	OT	Lundqvist	Citi Field	41,821 (outdoors)	21–13–5	47	Recap
40	January 3	Chicago	2–5		Lundqvist	Madison Square Garden	18,006	21–14–5	47	Recap
41	January 6	@ Arizona	2–1	SO	Lundqvist	Gila River Arena	13,420	22–14–5	49	Recap
42	January 7	@ Vegas	1–2		Pavelec	T-Mobile Arena	18,234	22–15–5	49	Recap
43	January 13	NY Islanders	2–7		Pavelec	Madison Square Garden	18,006	22–16–5	49	Recap
44	January 14	@ Pittsburgh	2–5		Lundqvist	PPG Paints Arena	18,647	22–17–5	49	Recap
45	January 16	Philadelphia	5–1		Lundqvist	Madison Square Garden	18,006	23–17–5	51	Recap
46	January 18	Buffalo	4–3		Lundqvist	Madison Square Garden	18,006	24–17–5	53	Recap
47	January 20	@ Colorado	1–3		Lundqvist	Pepsi Center	18,056	24–18–5	53	Recap
48	January 21	@ Los Angeles	2–4		Lundqvist	Staples Center	18,230	24–19–5	53	Recap
49	January 23	@ Anaheim	3–6		Pavelec	Honda Center	16,763	24–20–5	53	Recap
50	January 25	@ San Jose	6–5		Pavelec	SAP Center	17,477	25–20–5	55	Recap

February: 3–10–1, 7 points (Home: 1–4–1; Road: 2–6–0)

Game	Date	Opponent	Score	OT	Decision	Location	Attendance	Record	Points	Recap
51	February 1	Toronto	0–4		Lundqvist	Madison Square Garden	18,006	25–21–5	55	Recap
52	February 3	@ Nashville	2–5		Lundqvist	Bridgestone Arena	17,543	25–22–5	55	Recap
53	February 5	@ Dallas	1–2		Lundqvist	American Airlines Center	17,543	25–23–5	55	Recap
54	February 7	Boston	1–6		Lundqvist	Madison Square Garden	18,006	25–24–5	55	Recap
55	February 9	Calgary	4–3		Lundqvist	Madison Square Garden	18,006	26–24–5	57	Recap
56	February 11	@ Winnipeg	3–1		Lundqvist	Bell MTS Place	15,321	27–24–5	59	Recap
57	February 13	@ Minnesota	2–3		Lundqvist	Xcel Energy Center	18,887	27–25–5	59	Recap
58	February 15	@ NY Islanders	0–3		Lundqvist	Barclays Center	15,795	27–26–5	59	Recap
59	February 17	@ Ottawa	3–6		Lundqvist	Canadian Tire Centre	17,259	27–27–5	59	Recap
60	February 18	Philadelphia	4–7		Lundqvist	Madison Square Garden	18,006	27–28–5	59	Recap
61	February 22	@ Montreal	1–3		Georgiev	Bell Centre	21,302	27–29–5	59	Recap
62	February 23	Minnesota	1–4		Georgiev	Madison Square Garden	18,006	27–30–5	59	Recap
63	February 25	Detroit	2–3	OT	Lundqvist	Madison Square Garden	18,006	27–30–6	60	Recap
64	February 28	@ Vancouver	6–5	OT	Lundqvist	Rogers Arena	18,044	28–30–6	62	Recap

March: 6–6–3, 15 points (Home: 3–4–0; Road: 3–2–3)

Game	Date	Opponent	Score	OT	Decision	Location	Attendance	Record	Points	Recap
65	March 2	@ Calgary	3–1		Lundqvist	Scotiabank Saddledome	19,143	29–30–6	64	Recap
66	March 3	@ Edmonton	3–2		Georgiev	Rogers Place	18,347	30–30–6	66	Recap
67	March 6	Winnipeg	0–3		Lundqvist	Madison Square Garden	18,006	30–31–6	66	Recap
68	March 8	@ Tampa Bay	3–5		Lundqvist	Amalie Arena	19,092	30–32–6	66	Recap
69	March 10	@ Florida	3–4	SO	Lundqvist	BB&T Center	16,712	30–32–7	67	Recap
70	March 12	Carolina	6–3		Georgiev	Madison Square Garden	17,679	31–32–7	69	Recap
71	March 14	Pittsburgh	4–3	OT	Georgiev	Madison Square Garden	17,379	32–32–7	71	Recap
72	March 17	@ St. Louis	3–4	OT	Georgiev	Scottrade Center	18,975	32–32–8	72	Recap
73	March 20	Columbus	3–5		Lundqvist	Madison Square Garden	17,194	32–33–8	72	Recap
74	March 22	@ Philadelphia	3–4		Georgiev	Wells Fargo Center	19,584	32–34–8	72	Recap
75	March 24	Buffalo	5–1		Georgiev	Madison Square Garden	18,006	33–34–8	74	Recap
76	March 26	Washington	2–4		Georgiev	Madison Square Garden	18,006	33–35–8	74	Recap
77	March 28	@ Washington	2–3	OT	Lundqvist	Capital One Arena	18,506	33–35–9	75	Recap
78	March 30	Tampa Bay	3–7		Pavelec	Madison Square Garden	18,006	33–36–9	75	Recap
79	March 31	@ Carolina	2–1		Lundqvist	PNC Arena	14,993	34–36–9	77	Recap

April: 0–3–0, 0 points (Home: 0–0–0; Road: 0–3–0)

Game	Date	Opponent	Score	OT	Decision	Location	Attendance	Record	Points	Recap
80	April 3	@ New Jersey	2–5		Lundqvist	Prudential Center	16,514	34–37–9	77	Recap
81	April 5	@ NY Islanders	1–2		Pavelec	Barclays Center	14,152	34–38–9	77	Recap
82	April 7	@ Philadelphia	0–5		Lundqvist	Wells Fargo Center	20,028	34–39–9	77	Recap

Win (2 Points) Loss (0 points) Overtime/shootout loss (1 point)

== Player statistics ==
As of April 7, 2018

Skaters

Regular season
Player	GP	G	A	Pts	+/−	PIM
Mats Zuccarello	80	16	37	53	−10	36
Mika Zibanejad	72	27	20	47	−23	14
Kevin Hayes	76	25	19	44	1	18
Pavel Buchnevich	74	14	29	43	−3	20
J. T. Miller^{‡}	63	13	27	40	−1	28
Chris Kreider	58	16	21	37	−2	44
Jesper Fast	71	13	20	33	−10	26
Michael Grabner^{‡}	59	26	6	31	11	12
Rick Nash^{‡}	60	18	10	28	−8	24
Jimmy Vesey	79	17	11	28	−18	20
David Desharnais	71	6	22	28	−22	18
Ryan McDonagh^{‡}	49	2	24	26	7	20
Brady Skjei	82	4	21	25	−27	39
Kevin Shattenkirk	46	5	18	23	−14	44
Ryan Spooner^{†}	20	4	12	16	−4	2
Paul Carey	60	7	7	14	−13	20
Neal Pionk	28	1	13	14	−1	12
Nick Holden^{‡}	55	3	9	12	−3	14
Cristoval Nieves	28	1	8	9	6	12
Marc Staal	72	1	7	8	11	18
Brendan Smith	44	1	7	8	2	69
Tony DeAngelo	32	0	8	8	−18	11
John Gilmour	28	2	3	5	−11	14
Vinni Lettieri	19	1	4	5	−12	0
Ryan Sproul	16	1	4	5	−6	6
Vladislav Namestnikov^{†}	19	2	2	4	−5	10
Peter Holland	23	1	3	4	−10	7
Filip Chytil	9	1	2	3	−5	4
Rob O'Gara^{†}	22	0	3	3	−2	6
Lias Andersson	7	1	1	2	1	0
Cody McLeod^{†}	25	0	2	2	−11	39
Steven Kampfer	22	0	1	1	−7	20
Adam Cracknell^{‡}	4	0	0	0	−1	0
Daniel Catenacci	1	0	0	0	−1	0
Steven Fogarty	1	0	0	0	0	2
Matt Beleskey^{†}	1	0	0	0	−1	4

Goaltenders

Regular season
Player	GP	GS	TOI	W	L	OT	GA	GAA	SA	SV%	SO	G	A	PIM
Henrik Lundqvist	63	61	3,502:32	26	26	7	174	2.98	2036	.915	2	0	1	0
Ondřej Pavelec	19	12	903:42	4	9	1	46	3.05	510	.910	1	0	0	2
Alexandar Georgiev	10	9	514:46	4	4	1	27	3.15	331	.918	0	0	0	0
Brandon Halverson	1	0	12:33	0	0	0	1	4.78	6	.833	0	0	0	0

- ^{†} Denotes player spent time with another team before joining the Rangers. Stats reflect time with the Rangers only.
- ^{‡} Denotes player was traded mid-season. Stats reflect time with the Rangers only.
- Bold/italics denotes franchise record.

== Awards and honors ==
=== Milestones ===
Regular season
Player	Milestone	Reached
Filip Chytil	1st career NHL game	October 5, 2017
Rick Nash	1,000th career NHL game	October 26, 2017
Marc Staal	700th career NHL game	October 26, 2017
Boo Nieves	1st career NHL assist 1st career NHL point	October 26, 2017
Brady Skjei	100th career NHL game	October 31, 2017
J. T. Miller	300th career NHL game	November 22, 2017
Boo Nieves	1st career NHL goal	December 5, 2017
Nick Holden	100th career NHL point	December 19, 2017
Vinni Lettieri	1st career NHL game 1st career NHL goal 1st career NHL point	December 29, 2017
Vinni Lettieri	1st career NHL assist	January 7, 2018
Mats Zuccarello	200th career NHL assist	January 13, 2018
Mats Zuccarello	300th career NHL point	February 3, 2018
Neal Pionk	1st career NHL game	February 9, 2018
John Gilmour	1st career NHL game	February 9, 2018
John Gilmour	1st career NHL goal 1st career NHL point	February 13, 2018
Neal Pionk	1st career NHL assist 1st career NHL point	February 13, 2018
Brandon Halverson	1st career NHL game	February 17, 2018
Alexandar Georgiev	1st career NHL game	February 22, 2018
John Gilmour	1st career NHL assist	March 3, 2018
Alexandar Georgiev	1st career NHL win	March 3, 2018
Rob O'Gara	1st career NHL assist 1st career NHL point	March 8, 2018
Mats Zuccarello	100th career NHL goal	March 12, 2018
Jimmy Vesey	1st career NHL hat trick	March 12, 2018
Neal Pionk	1st career NHL goal	March 24, 2018
Lias Andersson	1st career NHL game 1st career NHL goal 1st career NHL point	March 26, 2018
Lias Andersson	1st career NHL assist	March 28, 2018
Filip Chytil	1st career NHL assist 1st career NHL point	March 26, 2018
Filip Chytil	1st career NHL goal	March 30, 2018

=== Records ===
Regular season
Player	Record	Reached
Henrik Lundqvist	62nd career NHL shutout (16th all-time)	October 8, 2017
Henrik Lundqvist	408th career NHL win (9th all-time)	October 31, 2017
Henrik Lundqvist	63rd career NHL shutout (16th all-time)	November 19, 2017
Henrik Lundqvist	424th career NHL win (8th all-time)	January 6, 2018

== Transactions ==
The Rangers have been involved in the following transactions during the 2017–18 season.

=== Trades ===
Date	Details		Ref
June 23, 2017	To Arizona Coyotes Antti Raanta; Derek Stepan	To New York Rangers Tony DeAngelo; ARI's 1st-round pick (7th overall) in 2017	
October 21, 2017	To Detroit Red Wings Matt Puempel	To New York Rangers Ryan Sproul	
November 30, 2017	To Montreal Canadiens Adam Cracknell	To New York Rangers Peter Holland	
February 9, 2018	To Washington Capitals Adam Chapie; Joe Whitney	To New York Rangers John Albert; Hubert Labrie	
February 20, 2018	To Boston Bruins Nick Holden	To New York Rangers Rob O'Gara; 3rd-round pick in 2018	
February 22, 2018	To New Jersey Devils Michael Grabner	To New York Rangers Yegor Rykov; 2nd-round pick in 2018	
February 25, 2018	To Boston Bruins Rick Nash^{[Note 1]}	To New York Rangers Matt Beleskey^{[Note 2]} Ryan Lindgren; Ryan Spooner; 1st-round pick in 2018; 7th-round pick in 2019	
February 26, 2018	To Tampa Bay Lightning Ryan McDonagh; J. T. Miller	To New York Rangers Libor Hájek; Brett Howden; Vladislav Namestnikov; 1st-round pick in 2018; Conditional 2nd-round pick in 2019	
February 26, 2018	To Colorado Avalanche Ryan Graves	To New York Rangers Chris Bigras	

1. ^{Note 1} New York to retain 50% of salary as part of trade.
2. ^{Note 2} Boston to retain 50% of salary as part of trade.

=== Free agents acquired ===
Date	Player	Former team	Contract terms (in U.S. dollars)	Ref
July 1, 2017	Paul Carey	Washington Capitals	1-year, $650,000	
July 1, 2017	Ondřej Pavelec	Winnipeg Jets	1-year, $1.3 million	
July 1, 2017	Cole Schneider	Buffalo Sabres	2-year, $1.3 million	
July 1, 2017	Kevin Shattenkirk	Washington Capitals	4-year, $26.6 million	
July 4, 2017	David Desharnais	Edmonton Oilers	1-year, $1 million	
July 18, 2017	Alexandar Georgiev	TPS	3-year, $2.775 million entry-level contract	
December 6, 2017	Marek Mazanec	Slovan Bratislava	1-year, $650,000	
May 2, 2018	Michael Lindqvist	Färjestad BK	1-year, $1.775 million entry-level contract	
May 3, 2018	Ville Meskanen	Ilves	2-year, $2.275 million entry-level contract	

=== Free agents lost ===
Date	Player	New team	Contract terms (in U.S. dollars)	Ref
May 25, 2017	Magnus Hellberg	Kunlun Red Star	1-year	
June 13, 2017	Taylor Beck	Avtomobilist Yekaterinburg	1-year	
July 1, 2017	Adam Clendening	Arizona Coyotes	1 year, $650,000	
July 1, 2017	Dan Girardi	Tampa Bay Lightning	2-year, $6 million	
July 1, 2017	Marek Hrivík	Calgary Flames	1-year, $650,000	
July 1, 2017	Chris Summers	Pittsburgh Penguins	2-year, $1.3 million	
July 12, 2017	Nicklas Jensen	Jokerit	1-year	
July 14, 2017	Michael Paliotta	Toronto Marlies	1-year	
July 19, 2017	Chris Brown	Iserlohn Roosters	1-year	
August 23, 2017	Tommy Hughes	Hershey Bears	1-year	
September 6, 2017	Troy Donnay	Kansas City Mavericks	1-year	
October 3, 2017	Tanner Glass	Calgary Flames	1-year, $650,000	
October 4, 2017	Brandon Pirri	Vegas Golden Knights	1-year, $650,000	
October 4, 2017	Robin Kovacs	Luleå HF	2-year	
October 26, 2017	Malte Strömwall	Luleå HF	2-year	

=== Claimed via waivers ===
Player	Previous team	Date	Ref
Adam Cracknell	Dallas Stars	October 9, 2017	
Cody McLeod	Nashville Predators	January 25, 2018	

=== Lost via waivers ===
Player	New team	Date	Ref

=== Players released ===
Date	Player	Via	Ref
October 1, 2017	Robin Kovacs	Contract termination	
October 20, 2017	Malte Strömwall	Contract termination	
April 10, 2018	Alexei Bereglazov	Contract termination	
June 19, 2018	Sergei Zborovsky	Contract termination	

=== Lost via retirement ===
Date	Player	Ref
July 7, 2017	Kevin Klein	

=== Player signings ===
Date	Player	Contract terms (in U.S. dollars)	Ref
June 28, 2017	Brendan Smith	4-year, $17.4 million	
July 5, 2017	Jesper Fast	3-year, $5.55 million	
July 13, 2017	Lias Andersson	3-year, $2.775 million entry-level contract	
July 14, 2017	Filip Chytil	3-year, $2.775 million entry-level contract	
July 17, 2017	Daniel Catenacci	1-year, $650,000	
July 25, 2017	Mika Zibanejad	5-year, $26.75 million	
October 2, 2017	Brandon Crawley	3-year, $2.6 million entry-level contract	
March 5, 2018	Ty Ronning	3-year, $2.2525 million entry-level contract	
March 22, 2018	Ryan Lindgren	3-year, $3.3 million entry-level contract	
June 12, 2018	Marek Mazanec	1-year, $650,000 contract extension	

== Draft picks ==
Below are the New York Rangers' selections at the 2017 NHL entry draft, which was held on June 23 and 24, 2017, at the United Center in Chicago.

Round	#	Player	Pos	Nationality	College/junior/club team
1	7^{1}	Lias Andersson	C	Sweden	HV71 (SHL)
1	21	Filip Chytil	C	Czech Republic	PSG Zlín (ELH)
4	123^{2}	Brandon Crawley	D	United States	London Knights (OHL)
5	145	Calle Själin	D	Sweden	Östersunds IK (Hockeyettan)
6	157^{3}	Dominik Lakatoš	C	Czech Republic	HC Bílí Tygři Liberec (ELH)
6	174^{4}	Morgan Barron	C	Canada	St. Andrew's College (CISAA)
7	207	Patrik Virta	C	Finland	HC TPS (Liiga)

1. The Arizona Coyotes' first-round pick went to the New York Rangers as the result of a trade on June 23, 2017, that sent Derek Stepan and Antti Raanta to Arizona in exchange for Tony DeAngelo and this pick.
2. The Nashville Predators' fourth-round pick went to the New York Rangers as the result of a trade on June 24, 2017, that sent Florida's fourth-round pick in 2017 (102nd overall) to San Jose in exchange for a sixth-round pick in 2017 (174th overall) and this pick.
3. The Vancouver Canucks' sixth-round pick went to the New York Rangers as the result of a trade on January 8, 2016, that sent Emerson Etem to Vancouver in exchange for Nicklas Jensen and this pick.
4. The San Jose Sharks' sixth-round pick went to the New York Rangers as the result of a trade on June 24, 2017, that sent Florida's fourth-round pick in 2017 (102nd overall) to San Jose in exchange for Nashville's fourth-round pick in 2017 (123rd overall) and this pick.
