= 2017–18 St. Louis Blues season =

National Hockey League team season

2017–18 St. Louis Blues
- Division: 5th Central
- Conference: 9th Western
- 2017–18 record: 44–32–6
- Home record: 24–17–0
- Road record: 20–15–6
- Goals for: 226
- Goals against: 222

Team information
- General manager: Doug Armstrong
- Coach: Mike Yeo
- Captain: Alex Pietrangelo
- Alternate captains: Jaden Schwartz; Paul Stastny (Oct.–Feb.); Alexander Steen; Vladimir Tarasenko
- Arena: Scottrade Center
- Average attendance: 18,356
- Minor league affiliate: Tulsa Oilers (ECHL)

Team leaders
- Goals: Vladimir Tarasenko (33)
- Assists: Brayden Schenn (42)
- Points: Brayden Schenn (70)
- Penalty minutes: Chris Thorburn (60)
- Plus/minus: Jaden Schwartz (+16)
- Wins: Jake Allen (27)
- Goals against average: Carter Hutton (2.09)

The 2017–18 St. Louis Blues season was the 51st season for the National Hockey League (NHL) franchise that was established on June 5, 1967. The Blues missed the playoffs for the first time since the 2010–11 season.

== Off-season ==
The Blues made a decision to change the goalie coach on May 9, 2017, allowing Martin Brodeur to concentrate on his front office duties. Brodeur will lead the search for a new goalie coach.

All the other assistant coaches were let go on May 16. The team's president of hockey operations and general manager Doug Armstrong announced that Ray Bennett, Steve Thomas, Rick Wilson and Ty Conklin will not return to the Blues' coaching staff next season.

Armstrong announced on May 16 that the Blues had ended their minor league affiliation with the Chicago Wolves of the American Hockey League (AHL). The Wolves then became the first affiliate of the NHL expansion team, the Vegas Golden Knights. With 31 teams in the NHL and 30 teams in the AHL, the Blues would partner with the Golden Knights and continue sending prospects to the Wolves while also looking into having their own affiliate for the 2018–19 season. They would eventually affiliate with the Tulsa Oilers of the ECHL in August.

Armstrong announced on May 24, that Darryl Sydor, has been named assistant coach, signing a three-year contract. He spent last season as an assistant with AHL's Chicago Wolves, helping the club finish first in the Central Division in the regular season and reach the second round of the 2017 Calder Cup playoffs. Prior to that one season, he served as an assistant on Blues head coach Mike Yeo's staff during his five-season stint with the Minnesota Wild. Before beginning his coaching career, Sydor, the seventh overall draft pick to the Los Angeles Kings in 1990, appeared in 1,291 NHL regular season games across 18 seasons. The Edmonton, Alberta native played his final NHL season in St. Louis in 2009–10.

On May 25, Armstrong announced that former Blues' player Steve Ott, was signed for three years as an assistant coach.

On June 2, Armstrong announced that recently retired Blues' defenseman Barret Jackman, signed as their new development coach. Jackman said that as the team's development coach, he would primarily be working with prospects and draft picks, whether they are playing at the college, junior or AHL level. He was drafted by the Blues in the first round (17th overall) in 1999, ranks second on the club's all-time games played list with 803 games, trailing only Bernie Federko with 927.

On June 15, Armstrong finished his coaching changes, hiring Craig Berube as associate coach, Daniel Tkaczuk as an assistant and skills coach, and David Alexander as the team's goalie coach. Berube was behind the Philadelphia Flyers' bench for two seasons as its head coach (2013-2015), after spending parts of seven as an assistant. He also played 1,054 games in the NHL with the Flyers, Washington Capitals, Calgary Flames, Toronto Maple Leafs and the New York Islanders. He took over the Blues' AHL affiliate last season. In one year, he led the Chicago Wolves to a record of 44–19–13 for 101 points, a 27-point improvement over 2015–16. Tkaczuk was the sixth overall pick of the Calgary Flames in 1997, but the center played just 19 games in the NHL. His professional career ended in 2011, and he began coaching in the Ontario Hockey League (OHL) beginning in 2012. All three coaches were popular with the minor-league players in Chicago last season, particularly Berube. Alexander's hiring was welcome news to Allen, as both are natives of New Brunswick, and met when the Blues' goalie was just 14.

The Blues lost David Perron (LW) in the expansion draft for the new Vegas Golden Knights team on June 21. An established team could only lose one unprotected player during the draft to an expansion team. The Blues released their list of seven forwards, three defensemen, and one goalie, but Perron was not protected. All first and second-year professional players were exempt from the expansion draft, so players such as Robby Fabbri and Colton Parayko, who just completed their second seasons, did not have to be protected and did not count towards the Blues' protected list.

Patrik Berglund (C) had successful shoulder surgery on June 27, to repair his left shoulder he dislocated during a training session in Sweden. He is expected to be out until sometime in December. Berglund's surgery was performed by the Blues orthopedic surgeons Dr. Rick Wright, Dr. Matt Matava and Dr. Matthew Smith at the Washington University Orthopedic Center. Last season, Berglund posted a career high in goals (23) and finished with 34 points in 82 games played. For his career, the 29-year-old Västerås, Sweden native has played in 637 regular season games, scoring 151 goals and 145 assists (296 points).

Zach Sanford (LW), dislocated his left shoulder on the first day of training camp, September 16, and will miss at least five months. Jay Bouwmeester (D) suffered a left ankle fracture after a puck hit him, and will be re-evaluated in three weeks.

On September 28, the Blues announced that Robby Fabbri (C), 21, will be lost for the season after re-injuring his repaired left knee during training camp. He originally tore his ACL on February 4. He is expected to make a full recovery and is projected to participate in training camp when it begins next September, but he has been ruled out to play at any point this season or postseason. He had surgery on the knee on November 7. Dr. Bernard Bach first performed surgery on Fabbri's knee on Feb. 28 in Chicago, and he was cleared to play on July 31. Fabbri then re-injured his knee during training camp before undergoing today's operation. Fabbri has appeared in 123 career regular season games with the Blues, recording 66 points (29 goals, 37 assists) and 52 penalty minutes.

== Regular season ==
=== October ===
The Blues announced on October 10, they signed a five-year affiliation agreement with the San Antonio Rampage of the AHL to start with the 2018–19 season. For the 2017–18 season, as the Blues had no official AHL affiliation, agreed to send players to both their former AHL affiliate, the Chicago Wolves, and to the Rampage, which was still the primary AHL affiliate of the Colorado Avalanche.

For only the second time in their 51-year history, the Blues won their first four games of the season on October 10. They previously did it in the 2013-14 season, losing in their fifth game. Carter Hutton, in his first start of the season, made 32 saves on 33 shots, with the team winning 3-1.

Alexander Steen (LW) returned to active duty from his fractured hand on October 18, to help beat the Chicago Blackhawks 5-2 at home. He missed six games, and six of the seven pre-season games. Wade Megan (C) was placed on waivers. Jaden Schwartz (LW) scored a hat trick, including the third, an empty-netter 51 seconds remaining in the game. It was his third career hat trick, and the first for a Blues' player against the Blackhawks since Pierre Turgeon did it in 1998.

Before the October 27 game, after playing 10, the Blues rank third in the league in a "funny stat" with 165 blocked shots. Joel Edmundson (D) ranks second in the NHL with 33, and defense pair Carl Gunnarsson is 14th with 23. The pair are one of four teammate pairs in the top-15.

=== November ===
The Blues beat the Toronto Maple Leafs at home on November 4, (6-4) seen across Canada on Hockey Night in Canada. Brayden Schenn made a career high of four assists. Team scoring leader Jaden Schwartz had three assists, and defenseman-captain Alex Pietrangelo scored two goals.

Arianna "Ari" Dougan, 11, died from neuroblastoma cancer on the morning of November 11, after an eight-year fight. She had a large influence on the Blues. She had a special bond with Vladimir Tarasenko, who invited her on a road trip with the team the past March. The trip came together after she met Tarasenko in 2015, at the team's Hockey Fights Cancer night. Tarasenko invited her to celebrate her birthday with the team. He visited her in the hospital three days before her suffering ended. The "Blues had a pregame moment of silence for Ari Dougan; it may have been the longest and quietist moment of silence I've seen" tweeted reporter Tom Timmermann that Saturday night. Use #SpreadArisLight and #FightLikeAri, if you share a story or memory about her on social media. Ari's family will drop the puck before the Hockey Fights Cancer Game against the Los Angeles Kings on December 1. Ari's friend Vladimir Tarasenko will take the faceoff. Fans in attendance are encouraged to use their cell phone's flashlight feature during the puck drop to help #SpreadArisLight ahead of the game. Fans can help raise money to fight cancer by purchasing autographed mystery pucks or special edition lapel pins outside Section 114 at the game. Fans can also download an "I Fight For" sign at stlouisblues.com/HFC to display on their social media accounts.

Jay Bouwmeester (D) returned to play on November 21, after missing the first 21 games due to a fractured ankle suffered from a puck, on the third day of training camp, September 17.

Alex Pietrangelo (D), and captain, was named on November 21, the early favorite for the Norris Trophy, as the best defenseman in the NHL from a panel of 18 NHL staff members after the first quarter of the season. After 21 games, he has scored seven goals and 12 assists (19 points), with a +9 rating. He received 73 points in the voting including nine first-place votes. He was the only player to appear on all 18 ballots. Erik Karlsson of the Ottawa Senators ranked second with six first-place votes (61 points). The trophy is awarded at the NHL Awards ceremony in June.

Patrik Berglund (C), was activated before the November 29 game, after missing the first 24 games due to a shoulder injury suffered while training in Sweden. He had surgery in June. In the 2015-16 season, he had surgery on the other shoulder, missing the first three months of the season. To make room to activate Berglund from injured reserve, the Blues have placed defenseman Nate Prosser on waivers. Despite long-term injuries to several key players, the Blues have managed to record a 17-6-1 record (35 points) through the season's first 24 games, which is good for the best record in the League. Berglund (shoulder), Robby Fabbri (knee), Zach Sanford (shoulder), and Jay Bouwmeester (ankle) have all missed significant time with injuries.

The team ended a so-so month of November, 7-5-0 (14 points; HOME: 4-4-0, ROAD: 3-1-0) scoring 42 goals, giving up 36, and kept their hold in first place by a narrow margin in both the Central Division and the Western Conference over the Winnipeg Jets (34 points), and Nashville Predators (33 points) after 25 games. The Blues earned a total of 35 points, 17-7-1 (HOME: 9-4-0, ROAD: 8-3-1), scoring a total of 86 goals, giving up 66 goals, with the 86 scoring goals leading the Western Conference. The 35 points was second in the NHL to the Tampa Bay Lightning with 36 points (17-6-2) after the same 25 games. The Toronto Maple Leafs also had 35 points but they played 27 games (17-9-1).

=== December ===
The Blues will wear bedazzled jerseys during warm-ups before the December 1, Hockey Fights Cancer game, to honor Arianna "Ari" Dougan, who died on November 11, at the age of 11, after battling neuroblastoma for eight years. Her family will drop the puck prior to Friday's game as Vladimir Tarasenko takes the faceoff. The bedazzled jerseys will be autographed and auctioned online at Blues.gesture.com beginning Friday. Fans can also text "BLUES" to 52182 to bid. The auction ends December 4, and proceeds will benefit cancer research organizations.

Brayden Schenn scored a hat trick in the Blues' 4-3 win over the Montreal Canadiens in Montreal on December 5, breaking the Blues' three-game losing skid and the Canadiens' five-game winning streak. It was his third hat trick of his career, the first with the Blues. With his three goals, he leaped from 10 to 13, to be the co-leader in team goals with Jaden Schwartz, but trailing Schwartz by one point (an assist) with 33.

Goalie Jake Allen, 27, tied Blues' Hall of Fame goalie Glenn Hall (1967–71, 139 games, 2.43 GAA) for third place on the franchise's All-time shutout list with his 16th, at the Scottrade Center, against former coach Ken Hitchcock's Dallas Stars on December 7. Allen stopped all 29 shots, shutting out the Stars for the third time in 11 games against them. Allen has played 184 games to tie Hall. The Blues regained first place in the Central Division and Western Conference with their 19th win (40 points), over the Nashville Predators (18 wins, 40 points), and Winnipeg Jets (17 wins, 38 points).

Jaden Schwartz (LW), was placed on injured reserve the next day after his right ankle injury suffered when blocking a shot in Detroit on December 9. He shares ninth in the NHL overall with 35 points (14 goals, 21 assists), and ranks second with a +23 rating through 30 games this season. He will be re-evaluated after six weeks. Ivan Barbashev was recalled from the Chicago Wolves.

Alex Pietrangelo (D) was also injured in the same game as Schwartz, and was placed on injured reserve, December 12. He shares second among all defenseman with seven goals and ranks fifth with 23 points overall through 30 games this season. Jordan Schmaltz was recalled from the San Antonio Rampage. Pietrangelo was activated prior to the December 17 game, missing four games.

For the third time in a week, another Blues' player was placed on the IR. Jay Bouwmeester (D) was having a nagging injury that forced him out of the December 12 game, hosting against the Eastern Division leading Tampa Bay Lightning with the Blues leading the Western Conference, both with 44 points., and he also missed the December 14 game before the team put him on the IR, December 15. The Blues recalled Samuel Blais.

Carter Hutton set a franchise record when he stopped all 48 shots against him by the Winnipeg Jets on December 16. Chris Mason had 47 saves in a shutout on November 25, 2008, against the Nashville Predators. Hutton's shutout was the first for him this season and the ninth of his career. It vaulted him into first place among goalies dropping his GAA from 1.88 to 1.63 and also first with a 0.949 Save Percentage, which was 0.936 before his shutout. According to the Elias Sports Bureau, Hutton's 48-save performance was the most saves in a shutout by any NHL goaltender since Jan. 6, 2015, when the Colorado Avalanche's Semyon Varlamov stopped 54 shots in a 2-0 win against the Chicago Blackhawks.

Rookie Tage Thompson (C) scored his first NHL goal, but the Blues squandered 1-0 and 2-1 leads in the third period in Edmonton, and lost 2-3 on December 21, all five scored in the third period, with the winning goal 0:50 from the end of regulation.

GM Doug Armstrong signed a four-year extension with the Blues on December 27, with a team option for a fifth year. He was named the 11th General Manager in Blues history during the 2010 off-season. Since taking the reins, Armstrong has led the Blues to a 337-185-56 (.631) regular-season record which serves as the fourth-best mark in the NHL since the 2010-11 campaign.

The Blues finished December exactly at the half-way point after playing on December 31, their 41st game, tied with the Arizona Coyotes for the most played in the NHL. They went a middling 7-8-1, ending the first half at 24-15-2 (50 points; HOME: 4-4-0, ROAD: 3-4-1), on-pace for a 100-point season. In the 15 games played, they scored 33 goals (2.2 per game), giving up 36 (2.4 per game), for the first half scoring 119 (2.9 per game), giving up 102 (2.5 per game). There was a noticeable drop in offense for the month after Jaden Schwartz (LW) was placed on IR after an ankle injury in their 30th game on December 9. In playing one-half of their schedule by December 31, they have more time for rest and recovery from injuries between games in 2018, with only seven of their 41 remaining games coming on a consecutive game date. After their December 31 game, they ranked 3rd in the Central Division and 5th in the Western Conference. Their 51 wins in calendar year 2017 were the second-most in the NHL, only to the Washington Capitals who had 58. The Blues ranked second overall for the month of December with a 93.9% success rate on the penalty kill. Opponents scored just three power-play goals on 49 chances last month. From October through November of this season, the Blues ranked 27th in the League at 75.9%.

=== January ===
The Blues ended the Vegas Golden Knights eight-game winning streak and 13-game point streak with a 2-1 win on January 4. It was the Knights first regulation loss since December 1. The Knights (Pacific Division) lead the Western Conference with 56 points, the Blues third now with 54 points, and the Winnipeg Jets second with 55 points. The winning streak and point streak are the longest in NHL history by a team in its inaugural season. According to Elias Sports Bureau, the eight straight wins by Vegas was the most of any major professional sports team in North America in its inaugural season since the Denver Nuggets of the National Basketball Association won eight in a row from Oct. 22-Nov. 9, 1976.

Alexander Steen (LW) scored in the first period in the 2-1 win over the Vegas Golden Knights for his 427th point with the Blues, tying him with Keith Tkachuk for eighth place in the Blues all-time list. The Top 10 all-time list is: Bernie Federko - 1,073 2. Brett Hull - 936 3. Brian Sutter - 636 4. Garry Unger - 575 5. Pavol Demitra - 493 6. David Backes - 460 7. Al MacInnis - 452 8. Steen and Tkachuk - 427 10. Red Berenson - 412.

On January 10, the NHL announced that two Blues had made the roster for the 2018 NHL All-Star Game in Tampa, Florida for the Jan. 27-28 weekend. Brayden Schenn (C) and Alex Pietrangelo (D) were chosen. Both were picked the first time for an All-Star Game. Schenn has posted 43 points (17 goals, 26 assists) and a plus-19 rating through 45 games. Overall, he ranks 14th in points, 20th in goals and assists, second in game-winning goals (6) and ninth in even-strength points (31) and plus/minus. Schenn is also the only player in the NHL that has been perfect on shootouts this season (3-for-3). Pietrangelo has collected 29 points (seven goals, 22 assists) and a plus-15 rating through 41 games. Among all defensemen, he ranks 10th in points, second in even-strength points (21), eighth in goals, 12th in assists, ninth in plus/minus and ninth in ice-time per game (25:36). Pietrangelo is also one of just seven defensemen averaging more than three-and-a-half minutes of power-play time, and two minutes of shorthanded time per game. For the third straight season, the All-Star Game will feature a three-game tournament, played in a 3-on-3 format, showcasing teams from each division competing for a $1 million winner-take-all prize pool.

Former Blues' owner, Mike Shanahan died on January 15, at 78. He was also the general partner and chairman from 1986 until 1995. He was elected to the Missouri Sports Hall of Fame in 1997, and the St. Louis University Billikens soccer Hall of Fame, played on their 1959 and 1960 national championship teams. The Blues present owner Tom Stillman, and former players issued statements on his passing.

Injured LW Jaden Schwartz took the ice for the first time on January 15, since his December 9 injury. He was originally expected to be re-evaluated six weeks after being placed on injured reserve on December 10. He was activated on January 25, after missing 20 games from an ankle injury on December 9. To make room on the roster, Magnus Paajarvi (LW) was placed on waivers. The Blues were 20–8–2 and averaging 3.3 goals per game when Schwartz was injured. In the past 20 games, the Blues were 9–10–1 and averaging a league-worst 2.1 goals per game. He is third in scoring with 35 points (14 G, 21 A), trailing only Schenn (49 pts.) and Tarasenko (46 pts.).

The Blues finished January with a very good 7-3-1 record (HOME: 5-2-0, ROAD: 2-1-1). For the season, they are 31-18-3 (65 pts., HOME: 18-10-0, ROAD: 13-8-3), ranking 3rd in the Central Division and 4th in the Western Conference. They scored 32 goals, giving up 29 in the 11 games, with their worst, the January 9 game when they gave up seven. They have scored a total of 151 goals, giving up 131, for a +20 Goal Difference.

=== February ===
Defenseman Joel Edmundson, 24, had successful surgery on February 9, after suffering a broken right forearm in the February 8 game against the Colorado Avalanche during the first period. He was placed on the IR and will be re-evaluated in six weeks. The Blues have recalled Chris Butler from the San Antonio Rampage (AHL). Edmundson played in all 56 games until his injury, setting a new career high with six goals and tying his high with 15 points. He is in his third season with the Blues. Butler, 31, has appeared in 47 games for the Rampage this season, leading the team's defense with 23 points (eight goals, 15 assists). A native of St. Louis, he is a 6-foot-1, 205-pound defenseman, amassing 84 points (13 goals, 71 assists) in 388 career NHL regular season games, including stints with Buffalo (Sabres), Calgary (Flames), and St. Louis.

Zach Sanford (LW), 23, is close to returning to the active roster after suffering a dislocated left shoulder on the first day of training camp last September 16. The initial estimate was five to six months, and this upcoming February 16–18 weekend marks five months. He was activated from the IR, and assigned to the San Antonio Rampage (AHL) on February 15. He has not played a game in almost a year. He was part of the Feb. 27, 2017 trade that sent Kevin Shattenkirk to the Washington Capitals. The Blues also acquired a first-round pick in 2017, conditional draft picks, and prospect Brad Malone (signed with Edmonton Oilers on Jul. 3, 2017), in the deal. In 13 regular-season games with the Blues last season, Sanford scored two goals and three assists. He also made four appearances in the Stanley Cup Playoffs.

On February 15, the Blues acquired Nikita Soshnikov (RW/LW), 24, from the Toronto Maple Leafs, in exchange for a fourth-round draft pick in 2019. He played in 70 career games with the Maple Leafs since the 2015-16 season, recording seven goals and seven assists (14 points). A native of Nizhny Tagil, Russia, Soshnikov went undrafted in the NHL but played two seasons in the Kontinental Hockey League before signing a three-year deal with the Maple Leafs in 2015. Currently on injured reserve after a conditioning stint with the AHL's Toronto Marlies, Soshnikov has been practicing with the Maple Leafs since February 13. He will report to St. Louis in 7–10 days after he has obtained a U.S. visa. He will be added to the active roster when he obtains his visa and is cleared to play by team doctors. He is 5' 11" (181 cm), 190 pounds (86 kg). He was activated on February 23, and played his first game with the team on February 25.

Robert Bortuzzo (D), was placed on the injured reserve list February 22, with a left knee injury suffered in the February 16 game.

A season high six-game losing streak (1 point, OT) from February 11–25 (34-25-4, 72 pts.), pushed the Blues out of the top eight playoff spots, with 19 games to play. They were shut-out 4-0 in back-to-back games on February 23,25 and have lost twice to the now-first-place Central Division leaders Nashville Predators on February 13 and 25.

Hours before the trade deadline at 2pm on February 26, Paul Stastny (C), 32, was traded to the Winnipeg Jets, for a first-round conditional 2018 draft pick, a fourth-round 2020 draft pick, and prospect Erik Foley (RW), 20. The Blues get the fourth-rounder only if they fail to re-sign Foley on or before Aug. 15, 2019. Foley was a third-round pick by Winnipeg, No. 78 overall, in 2015. Stastny is scheduled to be an unrestricted free agent at the end of the season, and the Blues would have likely lost him for nothing. He played in all 63 games, with 12 goals and 28 assists for 40 points. He waived his no-trade clause for the trade to happen. Foley is 6-foot, 185 pounds (84 kg) playing in 32 games for Providence College with 34 points (15 goals, 19 assists, 14 penalty minutes). He is from Mansfield, Massachusetts. He has played for three seasons at Providence.

The Blues finished February with a very bad 4-8-1 record (HOME: 2-4-0, ROAD: 2-4-1), with the final game, a 2-1 win breaking a season-high seven-game losing streak. For the season (65 G), they are 35-26-4 (74 pts., HOME: 20-14-0, ROAD: 15-12-4), ranking 5th in the Central Division and 9th in the Western Conference, just outside of the two Wild Card spots. They scored 27 goals, giving up 42 in the 13 games, with their worst, the February 27 game when they gave up eight. They have scored a total of 178 goals, giving up 173, for a +5 Goal Difference.

=== March ===
Robert Bortuzzo (D) was activated before the March 3 game, after missing five games with a left knee injury on February 16. He was placed on the IR on February 22.

Jay Bouwmeester (D) is finished for the season on March 5, after his left hip injury was deemed too severe to continue playing, with an estimated four-to-six months overall. He had been playing since early December 2017, getting injections instead of opting for surgery, which he will have soon. Also on March 5, Scottie Upshall (D) is lost for at least four weeks with a left MCL sprain. Both are 34 years old.

Carter Hutton (G) suffered a neck injury on March 8 before the game, necessitating an emergency call-up of Ville Husso, 23, on March 9. The Blues signed goalie Ben Wexler to serve as the emergency backup to Jake Allen for the late-night game in San Jose.

Joel Edmundson (D) was activated from the IR and returned to the lineup earlier on March 15 for the night's game, almost a full week sooner than anticipated. He missed 13 games from a broken right forearm in a February 8 game. He leads the team with 53 penalty minutes, has six goals and nine assists for 15 points, with a -1 +/- in 56 games.

Top goal-scorer Vladimir Tarasenko was injured in the first period of the March 17 game with an upper-body injury, and did not return. He is day-to-day and will miss his first game of the season on March 18. Through 70 games this season, Tarasenko leads the Blues in goals (27) and shares the team lead in points (58), before Brayden Schenn scored the OT game-winner in that March 17 game, giving him the team lead with 59 points.

Alex Pietrangelo (D) was named the NHL First Star of the Week for the week of March 12–18 in three games. He led all NHL players with nine points. He became the 10th defenseman to record a four-point game (March 18) this season. He has set new single-season career highs in both goals (15) and game-winning goals (5), and one point off his career high in points with 50, with 10 games remaining. His 35 assists are tied for the team lead with Brayden Schenn (C). Among defensemen in Blues history, he ranks third in points (353) and goals (80), second in assists (273) and game-winning goals (20), and fifth in games played (607).

Jaden Schwartz (LW), was voted One of the Most Underrated Players, receiving 6.8% of the players' votes in the NHLPA Player Poll, second only to the 8.6% received by Nicklas Backstrom (Washington Capitals). Playing 52 games of the 72 through March 19 this season, Schwartz ranks third on the club in points (51). He has 20 goals, 31 assists and a team-leading plus/minus rating of plus-19.

Going into the March 21 game against the Boston Bruins, the Blues are 19–9–1 (.672) against Eastern Conference teams, which is the third-best win percentage among Western Conference teams. Their third consecutive overtime win that evening, against the Bruins gave the Blues a 20-9-1 (.683) win percentage against Eastern Conference teams. They are 20–19–4 (.512) win percentage against Western Conference teams. The win (40-28-5, 85 points) pushed the Blues into 9th place, two points behind the Los Angeles Kings for the second Western wild card, and three points behind the Colorado Avalanche for the first wild card spot. The Bruins (45–17–10; 100 points) joined the Tampa Bay Lightning in a playoff spot from the Eastern Conference. The Nashville Predators are the only team to secure a spot in the post-season from the Western Conference.

Vladimir Tarasenko returned to the lineup for the March 23 game, missing two games after injured in the March 17 game.

Carl Gunnarsson (D) left the March 23 game after a lower-body injury in the first period, after colliding with an opposing player and fell into the boards. In 62 games this season, Gunnarsson has scored five goals and four assists (9 points), with a plus-15 rating. He tore his left knee ACL, and will miss the final eight games of the regular season and the playoffs. He will undergo surgery once the swelling subsides, and will be re-evaluated in six months. He played in 63 games, penalized for 22 minutes.

The Blues got back into the playoff picture, as the first wild-card team with their sixth consecutive win on March 27, with six games remaining. They are 43-28-5 (91 points), good for fourth place in the Central Division and seventh place in the Western Conference. Four of the six wins have come in overtime.

Jordan Schmaltz (D) left the March 30 game in the first period with an upper-body injury and did not return. The Blues activated newly-acquired free agent Mitch Reinke (D), 22, who will make his NHL debut in the March 31 game. He is a student-athlete at Michigan Tech finishing his second season with the Huskies, scoring three goals and 21 assists, with a +8 rating in 35 games. He signed a two-year deal with the Blues on March 25. He is 5' 11" (180 cm), 181 pounds (82 kg).

Scottie Upshall (LW), 34, was injured in the March 31 game, with a lacerated left kidney. He is lost for the remainder of the season. He was in 63 games, earning 19 points (seven goals, 12 assists) and 46 penalty minutes in his third season with the Blues, 15th overall playing in 759 games, earning 138 goals, 147 assists (285 points), and 615 penalty minutes.

The Blues finished March with a good 8-3-2 record (HOME: 4-1-0, ROAD: 4-2-2), with the March 31 game their worst, an embarrassing 0-6 shutout by the last-place (8th-Pacific Division, 16th Western Conf., 3rd-worst NHL) Arizona Coyotes, (prior 27-40-11, 65 pts., 195 GF, 248 GA). For the season (78 G), they are 43-29-6 (92 pts., HOME: 24-15-0, ROAD: 19-14-6), ranking 5th in the Central Division and 9th in the Western Conference, just one point behind Colorado of the final Wild Card spot, and two points behind the Los Angeles for the top Wild Card spot, but the Blues have played one less game. They scored 37 goals, giving up 35 in the 13 games. They have scored a total of 215 goals, giving up 208, for a +7 Goal Difference. They have four games remaining in the regular season.

=== April ===
The Blues beat the Chicago Blackhawks, 4-1, on April 6, to jump over the Colorado Avalanche (93 points) for the final (8th place) Wild Card spot (94 points), They then faced the Colorado Avalanche for the final playoff spot in the Western Conference on April 7. Because of tie-breakers favoring the Blues over the Avalanche, the Blues only needed a tie in regulation to gain the point and rank at eighth place in the Conference to be in the playoffs. However, they lost to the Avalanche 2–5, in regulation, to drop out of the playoffs. Consequently, the Avalanche played the first place Nashville Predators in the first round of the playoffs. The captain, Alex Pietrangelo, played in his 617th game, passing Bob Plager for second place as a Blues' defenseman. Barret Jackman holds the top spot with 803 games played.

Vladimir Tarasenko (RW), 26, sustained a dislocated shoulder in the April 7 final game. He underwent surgery on April 11. He played in 80 games this season, ranking first on the team in goals (33) and second in points (66).

== Standings ==
Central Division
| Pos | Team | GP | W | L | OTL | ROW | GF | GA | GD | Pts |
|---|---|---|---|---|---|---|---|---|---|---|
| 1 | p – Nashville Predators | 82 | 53 | 18 | 11 | 47 | 267 | 211 | +56 | 117 |
| 2 | x – Winnipeg Jets | 82 | 52 | 20 | 10 | 48 | 277 | 218 | +59 | 114 |
| 3 | x – Minnesota Wild | 82 | 45 | 26 | 11 | 42 | 253 | 232 | +21 | 101 |
| 4 | x – Colorado Avalanche | 82 | 43 | 30 | 9 | 41 | 257 | 237 | +20 | 95 |
| 5 | St. Louis Blues | 82 | 44 | 32 | 6 | 41 | 226 | 222 | +4 | 94 |
| 6 | Dallas Stars | 82 | 42 | 32 | 8 | 38 | 235 | 225 | +10 | 92 |
| 7 | Chicago Blackhawks | 82 | 33 | 39 | 10 | 32 | 229 | 256 | −27 | 76 |

Source: National Hockey League
p – Clinched Presidents' Trophy; x – Clinched playoff spot

Western Conference Wild Card
| Pos | Div | Team | GP | W | L | OTL | ROW | GF | GA | GD | Pts |
|---|---|---|---|---|---|---|---|---|---|---|---|
| 1 | PA | x – Los Angeles Kings | 82 | 45 | 29 | 8 | 43 | 239 | 203 | +36 | 98 |
| 2 | CE | x – Colorado Avalanche | 82 | 43 | 30 | 9 | 41 | 257 | 237 | +20 | 95 |
| 3 | CE | St. Louis Blues | 82 | 44 | 32 | 6 | 41 | 226 | 222 | +4 | 94 |
| 4 | CE | Dallas Stars | 82 | 42 | 32 | 8 | 38 | 235 | 225 | +10 | 92 |
| 5 | PA | Calgary Flames | 82 | 37 | 35 | 10 | 35 | 218 | 248 | −30 | 84 |
| 6 | PA | Edmonton Oilers | 82 | 36 | 40 | 6 | 31 | 234 | 263 | −29 | 78 |
| 7 | CE | Chicago Blackhawks | 82 | 33 | 39 | 10 | 32 | 229 | 256 | −27 | 76 |
| 8 | PA | Vancouver Canucks | 82 | 31 | 40 | 11 | 31 | 218 | 264 | −46 | 73 |
| 9 | PA | Arizona Coyotes | 82 | 29 | 41 | 12 | 27 | 208 | 256 | −48 | 70 |

Source: National Hockey League
x – Clinched playoff spot

== Schedule and results ==
=== Preseason ===
The preseason schedule was released on June 16, 2017.

2017 preseason game log: 3–5–0 (Home: 1–3–0; Road: 2–2–0)
| # | Date | Visitor | Score | Home | OT | Decision | Attendance | Record | Recap |
|---|---|---|---|---|---|---|---|---|---|
| 1 | September 19 | St. Louis | 3–5 | Dallas | | Binnington | 12,567 | 0–1–0 | Recap |
| 2 | September 20 | Columbus | 2–3 | St. Louis | OT | Husso | 9,648 | 1–1–0 | Recap |
| 3 | September 22 | St. Louis | 4–0 | Washington | | Husso | 15,077 | 2–1–0 | Recap |
| 4 | September 23 | Dallas | 4–0 | St. Louis | | Allen | 15,742 | 2–2–0 | Recap |
| 5^{[a]} | September 24 | St. Louis | 4–1 | Pittsburgh | | Hutton | 1,500 | 3–2–0 | Recap |
| 6 | September 26 | St. Louis | 2–5 | Columbus | | Allen | 9,757 | 3–3–0 | Recap |
| 7^{[b]} | September 28 | Minnesota | 3–2 | St. Louis | | — | — | 3–4–0 | Recap |
| 8 | October 1 | Washington | 4–3 | St. Louis | | Allen | 14,258 | 3–5–0 | Recap |
Notes:^{a} Game was played in Cranberry Township, Pennsylvania.^{b} Game was played at Sprint Center in Kansas City, Missouri.

=== Regular season ===
The regular season schedule was published on June 22, 2017.

2017–18 game log

October: 10–2–1 (Home: 5–0–0; Road: 5–2–1)
| # | Date | Visitor | Score | Home | OT | Decision | Attendance | Record | Pts | Recap |
|---|---|---|---|---|---|---|---|---|---|---|
| 1 | October 4 | St. Louis | 5–4 | Pittsburgh | OT | Allen | 18,652 | 1–0–0 | 2 | Recap |
| 2 | October 7 | Dallas | 2–4 | St. Louis | | Allen | 18,858 | 2–0–0 | 4 | Recap |
| 3 | October 9 | St. Louis | 3–2 | NY Islanders | SO | Allen | 10,673 | 3–0–0 | 6 | Recap |
| 4 | October 10 | St. Louis | 3–1 | NY Rangers | | Hutton | 18,006 | 4–0–0 | 8 | Recap |
| 5 | October 12 | St. Louis | 2–5 | Florida | | Allen | 10,846 | 4–1–0 | 8 | Recap |
| 6 | October 14 | St. Louis | 1–2 | Tampa Bay | | Allen | 19,092 | 4–2–0 | 8 | Recap |
| 7 | October 18 | Chicago | 2–5 | St. Louis | | Allen | 18,752 | 5–2–0 | 10 | Recap |
| 8 | October 19 | St. Louis | 4–3 | Colorado | | Hutton | 13,890 | 6–2–0 | 12 | Recap |
| 9 | October 21 | St. Louis | 2–3 | Vegas | OT | Allen | 17,883 | 6–2–1 | 13 | Recap |
| 10 | October 25 | Calgary | 2–5 | St. Louis | | Allen | 17,227 | 7–2–1 | 15 | Recap |
| 11 | October 27 | St. Louis | 2–1 | Carolina | | Hutton | 10,069 | 8–2–1 | 17 | Recap |
| 12 | October 28 | Columbus | 1–4 | St. Louis | | Allen | 17,834 | 9–2–1 | 19 | Recap |
| 13 | October 30 | Los Angeles | 2–4 | St. Louis | | Allen | 17,423 | 10–2–1 | 21 | Recap |

November: 7–5–0 (Home: 4–4–0; Road: 3–1–0)
| # | Date | Visitor | Score | Home | OT | Decision | Attendance | Record | Pts | Recap |
|---|---|---|---|---|---|---|---|---|---|---|
| 14 | November 2 | Philadelphia | 2–0 | St. Louis | | Allen | 17,162 | 10–3–1 | 21 | Recap |
| 15 | November 4 | Toronto | 4–6 | St. Louis | | Allen | 19,046 | 11–3–1 | 23 | Recap |
| 16 | November 7 | St. Louis | 3–1 | New Jersey | | Allen | 12,317 | 12–3–1 | 25 | Recap |
| 17 | November 9 | Arizona | 2–3 | St. Louis | SO | Hutton | 18,156 | 13–3–1 | 27 | Recap |
| 18 | November 11 | NY Islanders | 5–2 | St. Louis | | Allen | 18,761 | 13–4–1 | 27 | Recap |
| 19 | November 13 | St. Louis | 4–7 | Calgary | | Allen | 18,519 | 13–5–1 | 27 | Recap |
| 20 | November 16 | St. Louis | 4–1 | Edmonton | | Allen | 18,347 | 14–5–1 | 29 | Recap |
| 21 | November 18 | St. Louis | 4–3 | Vancouver | OT | Allen | 18,865 | 15–5–1 | 31 | Recap |
| 22 | November 21 | Edmonton | 3–8 | St. Louis | | Allen | 18,819 | 16–5–1 | 33 | Recap |
| 23 | November 24 | Nashville | 2–0 | St. Louis | | Hutton | 19,033 | 16–6–1 | 33 | Recap |
| 24 | November 25 | Minnesota | 3–6 | St. Louis | | Allen | 18,610 | 17–6–1 | 35 | Recap |
| 25 | November 29 | Anaheim | 3–2 | St. Louis | | Allen | 16,760 | 17–7–1 | 35 | Recap |

December: 7–8–1 (Home: 4–4–0; Road: 3–4–1)
| # | Date | Visitor | Score | Home | OT | Decision | Attendance | Record | Pts | Recap |
|---|---|---|---|---|---|---|---|---|---|---|
| 26 | December 1 | Los Angeles | 4–1 | St. Louis | | Hutton | 18,322 | 17–8–1 | 35 | Recap |
| 27 | December 2 | St. Louis | 1–2 | Minnesota | OT | Allen | 19,107 | 17–8–2 | 36 | Recap |
| 28 | December 5 | St. Louis | 4–3 | Montreal | | Allen | 21,302 | 18–8–2 | 38 | Recap |
| 29 | December 7 | Dallas | 0–3 | St. Louis | | Allen | 16,341 | 19–8–2 | 40 | Recap |
| 30 | December 9 | St. Louis | 6–1 | Detroit | | Allen | 19,515 | 20–8–2 | 42 | Recap |
| 31 | December 10 | Buffalo | 2–3 | St. Louis | OT | Allen | 17,310 | 21–8–2 | 44 | Recap |
| 32 | December 12 | Tampa Bay | 3–0 | St. Louis | | Allen | 18,290 | 21–9–2 | 44 | Recap |
| 33 | December 14 | Anaheim | 3–1 | St. Louis | | Allen | 17,822 | 21–10–2 | 44 | Recap |
| 34 | December 16 | Winnipeg | 0–2 | St. Louis | | Hutton | 17,964 | 22–10–2 | 46 | Recap |
| 35 | December 17 | St. Louis | 0–4 | Winnipeg | | Allen | 15,321 | 22–11–2 | 46 | Recap |
| 36 | December 20 | St. Louis | 1–2 | Calgary | | Hutton | 18,410 | 22–12–2 | 46 | Recap |
| 37 | December 21 | St. Louis | 2–3 | Edmonton | | Allen | 18,347 | 22–13–2 | 46 | Recap |
| 38 | December 23 | St. Louis | 3–1 | Vancouver | | Allen | 17,919 | 23–13–2 | 48 | Recap |
| 39 | December 27 | Nashville | 2–1 | St. Louis | | Allen | 19,097 | 23–14–2 | 48 | Recap |
| 40 | December 29 | St. Louis | 2–4 | Dallas | | Allen | 18,532 | 23–15–2 | 48 | Recap |
| 41 | December 30 | Carolina | 2–3 | St. Louis | | Hutton | 18,749 | 24–15–2 | 50 | Recap |

January: 7–3–1 (Home: 5–2–0; Road: 2–1–1)
| # | Date | Visitor | Score | Home | OT | Decision | Attendance | Record | Pts | Recap |
|---|---|---|---|---|---|---|---|---|---|---|
| 42 | January 2 | New Jersey | 2–3 | St. Louis | SO | Hutton | 18,324 | 25–15–2 | 52 | Recap |
| 43 | January 4 | Vegas | 1–2 | St. Louis | | Hutton | 18,976 | 26–15–2 | 54 | Recap |
| 44 | January 6 | St. Louis | 3–6 | Philadelphia | | Allen | 19,665 | 26–16–2 | 54 | Recap |
| 45 | January 7 | St. Louis | 3–4 | Washington | OT | Hutton | 18,506 | 26–16–3 | 55 | Recap |
| 46 | January 9 | Florida | 7–4 | St. Louis | | Allen | 18,783 | 26–17–3 | 55 | Recap |
| 47 | January 16 | St. Louis | 2–1 | Toronto | OT | Hutton | 18,951 | 27–17–3 | 57 | Recap |
| 48 | January 18 | St. Louis | 4–1 | Ottawa | | Hutton | 14,002 | 28–17–3 | 59 | Recap |
| 49 | January 20 | Arizona | 5–2 | St. Louis | | Hutton | 19,235 | 28–18–3 | 59 | Recap |
| 50 | January 23 | Ottawa | 0–3 | St. Louis | | Hutton | 18,505 | 29–18–3 | 61 | Recap |
| 51 | January 25 | Colorado | 1–3 | St. Louis | | Hutton | 18,817 | 30–18–3 | 63 | Recap |
| 52 | January 30 | Montreal | 1–3 | St. Louis | | Hutton | 18,149 | 31–18–3 | 65 | Recap |

February: 4–8–1 (Home: 2–4–0; Road: 2–4–1)
| # | Date | Visitor | Score | Home | OT | Decision | Attendance | Record | Pts | Recap |
|---|---|---|---|---|---|---|---|---|---|---|
| 53 | February 1 | St. Louis | 1–3 | Boston | | Allen | 17,565 | 31–19–3 | 65 | Recap |
| 54 | February 3 | St. Louis | 1–0 | Buffalo | | Hutton | 18,777 | 32–19–3 | 67 | Recap |
| 55 | February 6 | Minnesota | 6–2 | St. Louis | | Hutton | 17,821 | 32–20–3 | 67 | Recap |
| 56 | February 8 | Colorado | 1–6 | St. Louis | | Hutton | 18,951 | 33–20–3 | 69 | Recap |
| 57 | February 9 | St. Louis | 5–2 | Winnipeg | | Allen | 15,321 | 34–20–3 | 71 | Recap |
| 58 | February 11 | Pittsburgh | 4–1 | St. Louis | | Allen | 18,975 | 34–21–3 | 71 | Recap |
| 59 | February 13 | St. Louis | 3–4 | Nashville | OT | Hutton | 17,221 | 34–21–4 | 72 | Recap |
| 60 | February 16 | St. Louis | 1–2 | Dallas | | Allen | 18,532 | 34–22–4 | 72 | Recap |
| 61 | February 20 | San Jose | 3–2 | St. Louis | | Hutton | 17,297 | 34–23–4 | 72 | Recap |
| 62 | February 23 | Winnipeg | 4–0 | St. Louis | | Allen | 18,912 | 34–24–4 | 72 | Recap |
| 63 | February 25 | St. Louis | 0–4 | Nashville | | Allen | 17,523 | 34–25–4 | 72 | Recap |
| 64 | February 27 | St. Louis | 3–8 | Minnesota | | Hutton | 19,261 | 34–26–4 | 72 | Recap |
| 65 | February 28 | Detroit | 1–2 | St. Louis | | Hutton | 18,813 | 35–26–4 | 74 | Recap |

March: 8–3–2 (Home: 4–1–0; Road: 4–2–2)
| # | Date | Visitor | Score | Home | OT | Decision | Attendance | Record | Pts | Recap |
|---|---|---|---|---|---|---|---|---|---|---|
| 66 | March 3 | St. Louis | 2–3 | Dallas | OT | Hutton | 18,321 | 35–26–5 | 75 | Recap |
| 67 | March 8 | St. Louis | 0–2 | San Jose | | Allen | 17,400 | 35–27–5 | 75 | Recap |
| 68 | March 10 | St. Louis | 7–2 | Los Angeles | | Allen | 18,230 | 36–27–5 | 77 | Recap |
| 69 | March 12 | St. Louis | 4–2 | Anaheim | | Allen | 16,312 | 37–27–5 | 79 | Recap |
| 70 | March 15 | Colorado | 4–1 | St. Louis | | Allen | 18,885 | 37–28–5 | 79 | Recap |
| 71 | March 17 | NY Rangers | 3–4 | St. Louis | OT | Allen | 18,975 | 38–28–5 | 81 | Recap |
| 72 | March 18 | St. Louis | 5–4 | Chicago | OT | Allen | 21,687 | 39–28–5 | 83 | Recap |
| 73 | March 21 | Boston | 1–2 | St. Louis | OT | Allen | 18,423 | 40–28–5 | 85 | Recap |
| 74 | March 23 | Vancouver | 1–4 | St. Louis | | Allen | 17,724 | 41–28–5 | 87 | Recap |
| 75 | March 24 | St. Louis | 2–1 | Columbus | | Allen | 19,080 | 42–28–5 | 89 | Recap |
| 76 | March 27 | San Jose | 2–3 | St. Louis | OT | Allen | 18,947 | 43–28–5 | 91 | Recap |
| 77 | March 30 | St. Louis | 3–4 | Vegas | OT | Allen | 18,191 | 43–28–6 | 92 | Recap |
| 78 | March 31 | St. Louis | 0–6 | Arizona | | Allen | 17,380 | 43–29–6 | 92 | Recap |

April: 1–3–0 (Home: 0–2–0; Road: 1–1–0)
| # | Date | Visitor | Score | Home | OT | Decision | Attendance | Record | Pts | Recap |
|---|---|---|---|---|---|---|---|---|---|---|
| 79 | April 2 | Washington | 4–2 | St. Louis | | Allen | 18,841 | 43–30–6 | 92 | Recap |
| 80 | April 4 | Chicago | 4–3 | St. Louis | | Allen | 18,935 | 43–31–6 | 92 | Recap |
| 81 | April 6 | St. Louis | 4–1 | Chicago | | Hutton | 22,218 | 44–31–6 | 94 | Recap |
| 82 | April 7 | St. Louis | 2–5 | Colorado | | Allen | 18,087 | 44–32–6 | 94 | Recap |

Legend: Win (2 points) Loss (0 points) Overtime/shootout loss (1 point)

== Player statistics ==
Statistics

=== Skaters ===
Final on April 7, 2018
BOLD = leads team in category
Italics = on IR, injured, or not in Blues organization

Regular season
| Player | GP | G | A | Pts | +/− | PIM |
|---|---|---|---|---|---|---|
| Brayden Schenn (C) | **82** | 28 | **42** | **70** | 10 | 56 |
| Vladimir Tarasenko (RW) | 80 | **33** | 33 | 66 | **15** | 17 |
| Jaden Schwartz (LW) | 62 | 24 | 35 | 59 | **15** | 26 |
| Alex Pietrangelo (D) | 78 | 15 | 39 | 54 | 8 | 22 |
| Alexander Steen (LW) | 76 | 15 | 31 | 46 | −11 | 20 |
| Paul Stastny (C) | 63 | 12 | 28 | 40 | −5 | 14 |
| Colton Parayko (D) | **82** | 6 | 29 | 35 | −7 | 13 |
| Kyle Brodziak (C) | 81 | 10 | 23 | 33 | 13 | 33 |
| Vladimir Sobotka (LW) | 81 | 11 | 20 | 31 | −6 | 50 |
| Patrik Berglund (C) | 57 | 17 | 9 | 26 | −5 | 30 |
| Vince Dunn (D) | 75 | 5 | 19 | 24 | 1 | 20 |
| Scottie Upshall (RW) | 63 | 7 | 12 | 19 | −1 | 46 |
| Joel Edmundson (D) | 69 | 7 | 10 | 17 | −1 | 57 |
| Dmitrij Jaskin (RW) | 76 | 6 | 11 | 17 | 6 | 14 |
| Ivan Barbashev (C) | 53 | 7 | 6 | 13 | −1 | 4 |
| Robert Bortuzzo (D) | 72 | 4 | 9 | 13 | 11 | 41 |
| Carl Gunnarsson (D) | 63 | 5 | 4 | 9 | **15** | 22 |
| Tage Thompson (C) | 41 | 3 | 6 | 9 | −12 | 12 |
| Jay Bouwmeester (D) | 35 | 2 | 5 | 7 | 5 | 16 |
| Chris Thorburn (RW) | 50 | 1 | 6 | 7 | −4 | **60** |
| Oskar Sundqvist (C) | 42 | 1 | 4 | 5 | −5 | 14 |
| Magnus Paajarvi (LW) | 44 | 2 | 2 | 4 | −3 | 8 |
| Samuel Blais (LW) | 11 | 1 | 2 | 3 | 1 | 6 |
| Nikita Soshnikov (RW) | 12 | 1 | 1 | 2 | 0 | 4 |
| Jordan Schmaltz (D) | 13 | 0 | 1 | 1 | 0 | 6 |
| Jake Allen (G) | 59 | 0 | 1 | 1 | 0 | 0 |
| Carter Hutton (G) | 32 | 0 | 0 | 0 | 0 | 2 |
| Chris Butler (D) | 6 | 0 | 0 | 0 | 1 | 2 |
| Beau Bennett (RW) | 6 | 0 | 0 | 0 | −2 | 0 |
| Wade Megan (C) | 1 | 0 | 0 | 0 | 0 | 0 |
| Nate Prosser (D) | 1 | 0 | 0 | 0 | 0 | 0 |
| Mitch Reinke (D) | 1 | 0 | 0 | 0 | 0 | 0 |
| Team totals | 82 | 223 | 388 | 611 | 38 | 615 |

=== Goaltenders ===
Final on April 7, 2018

BOLD = leads NHL in category

Regular season
| Player | GP | GS | TOI | W | L | OT | GA | GAA | SA | SV% | SO | G | A | PIM |
|---|---|---|---|---|---|---|---|---|---|---|---|---|---|---|
| Jake Allen | 59 | 56 | 3,316:58 | 27 | 25 | 3 | 152 | 2.75 | 1,614 | 0.906 | 1 | 0 | 1 | 0 |
| Carter Hutton | 32 | 26 | 1,609:32 | 17 | 7 | 3 | 56 | **2.09** | 810 | **0.931** | 3 | 0 | 0 | 2 |

== Awards and milestones ==
=== Awards ===
Regular season
| Player | Award | Awarded |
|---|---|---|
| J. Schwartz | NHL Third Star (October) | November 1 |
| B. Schenn | NHL Third Star (November) | December 1 |
| B. Schenn | NHL First Star of Week (December 4–10) | December 11 |
| J. Allen | NHL Second Star of Week (December 4–10) | December 11 |
| B. Schenn, A. Pietrangelo | Picked for the 2018 All-Star Game | January 10 |
| A. Pietrangelo | NHL First Star of Week (March 12–18) | March 19 |
| J. Schwartz | NHL One of the Most Underrated Players | March 20 |
| J. Allen | NHL Second Star of Week (March 19–25) | March 26 |

=== Milestones ===
Regular season
| Player | Milestone | Reached |
|---|---|---|
| V. Dunn | 1st NHL goal | October 12, 2017 |
| P. Stastny | 600th NHL point | October 19, 2017 |
| V. Tarasenko | 300th NHL point | November 4, 2017 |
| S. Blais | 1st NHL goal | November 25, 2017 |
| B. Schenn | Hat trick | December 5, 2017 |
| J. Allen | 16th Blues' shutout ties Glenn Hall for 3rd place on franchise's all-time list | December 7, 2017 |
| C. Hutton | Most Saves in Shutout by Blues' Goalie (48) | December 16, 2017 |
| T. Thompson | 1st NHL goal | December 21, 2017 |
| A. Steen | Passed forward Larry Patey for 7th place with 602 Blues games | December 31, 2017 |
| A. Steen | Tied forward Keith Tkachuk for 8th place with 427 Blues points | January 4, 2018 |
| A. Steen | Tied Bob Plager for 8th place with 615 Blues games | January 31, 2018 |
| J. Allen | Passed Grant Fuhr for 3rd place with 109 Blues wins | February 9, 2018 |
| J. Bouwmeester | 1,100th game, 8th place among Blues; active players | February 16, 2018 |
| A. Pietrangelo | 599th game, 5th place among Blues defensemen, passing Chris Pronger | February 27, 2018 |
| B. Schenn | 500th NHL game | March 8, 2018 |
| C. Parayko | 100th NHL point | March 10, 2018 |
| O. Sundqvist | First goal as a Blue | March 27, 2018 |
| M. Reinke | First NHL game | March 31, 2018 |
| A. Pietrangelo | 617th game, 2nd place among Blues defensemen, passing Bob Plager | April 7, 2018 |

== Transactions ==
The Blues has been involved in the following transactions:

=== Trades ===
| Date | Details | | Ref |
|---|---|---|---|
| June 23, 2017 | To Philadelphia Flyers Jori Lehtera (C); 27th overall pick in 1st-round in 2017; Conditional pick in 2018 | To St. Louis Blues Brayden Schenn (C) |
| June 23, 2017 | To Pittsburgh Penguins Ryan Reaves (RW); 51st overall pick in 2nd-round in 2017 | To St. Louis Blues Oskar Sundqvist (C); 31st overall pick in 1st-round in 2017 |
| February 15, 2018 | To Toronto Maple Leafs 4th-round pick in 2019 | To St. Louis Blues Nikita Soshnikov (RW/LW) |
| February 26, 2018 | To Winnipeg Jets Paul Stastny (C) | To St. Louis Blues Erik Foley (LW); Conditional 1st-round pick in 2018; Conditional 4th-round pick in 2020 |

=== Free agents acquired ===
| Date | Player | Former team | Contract terms (in U.S. dollars) | Ref |
|---|---|---|---|---|
| July 1, 2017 | Chris Thorburn (RW) | Vegas Golden Knights | 2-year, $1.8 mil. | |
| July 1, 2017 | Beau Bennett (RW) | New Jersey Devils | 1-year, $650,000 | |
| August 8, 2017 | Nate Prosser (D) | Minnesota Wild | 2-year, $1.3 mil. | |
| March 25, 2018 | Mitch Reinke (D) | Michigan Tech Huskies | 2-year, $1.85 mil. entry-level contract | |

=== Free agents lost ===
| Date | Player | New team | Contract terms (in U.S. dollars) | Ref |
|---|---|---|---|---|
| May 15, 2017 | Morgan Ellis (D) | Skellefteå AIK | Unknown | |
| June 28, 2017 | Jacob Doty (C) | Braehead Clan | Unknown | |
| July 1, 2017 | Kenny Agostino (LW) | Boston Bruins | 1-year, $875,000 | |
| July 1, 2017 | Andrew Agozzino (LW) | Colorado Avalanche | 2-year, $1.3 mil. | |
| July 1, 2017 | Ty Rattie (RW) | Edmonton Oilers | 1-year, $700,000 | |
| July 1, 2017 | Landon Ferraro (C) | Minnesota Wild | 2-year, $1.4 mil. | |
| July 3, 2017 | Brad Malone (C) | Edmonton Oilers | 2-year, $1.3 mil. | |
| July 4, 2017 | Nail Yakupov (RW) | Colorado Avalanche | 1-year, $875,000 | |
| July 20, 2017 | Reid McNeill (D) | Syracuse Crunch | 1-year | |
| October 9, 2017 | Jordan Caron (RW) | Krefeld Pinguine | Unknown | |

=== Claimed via waivers ===
| Player | Previous team | Date | Ref |

=== Lost via waivers or expansion draft ===
| Player | New team | Date lost | Ref |
|---|---|---|---|
| David Perron (LW) | Vegas Golden Knights | June 21, 2017 | |
| Nate Prosser (D) | Minnesota Wild | November 29, 2017 | |
| Magnus Paajarvi (LW) | Ottawa Senators | January 25, 2018 | |

=== Lost via retirement ===
| Date | Player | Ref |

=== Player signings ===
| Date | Player | Contract terms (in U.S. dollars) | Ref |
|---|---|---|---|
| June 26, 2017 | Wade Megan (C) | 1-year, $650,000 | |
| June 28, 2017 | Chris Butler (D) | 2-year, $1.3 million | |
| June 29, 2017 | Magnus Paajarvi (LW) | 1-year, $800,000 | |
| July 1, 2017 | Oskar Sundqvist (C) | 1-year, $675,000 | |
| July 5, 2017 | Klim Kostin (RW) | 3-year, $3.4125 mil. entry-level contract | |
| July 20, 2017 | Colton Parayko (D) | 5-year, $27.5 million | |
| July 21, 2017 | Jordan Binnington (G) | 1-year, $660,000 | |
| September 11, 2017 | Petteri Lindbohm (D) | 1-year, $650,000 | |
| September 28, 2017 | Robert Thomas (C) | 3-year, $3.625 million entry-level contract | |
| September 29, 2017 | Scottie Upshall (LW) | 1-year, $800,000 | |
| October 2, 2017 | Tanner Kaspick (C) | 3-year, $2.5 million entry-level contract | |
| March 25, 2018 | Austin Poganski (RW) | 2-year, $1.525 million entry-level contract | |
| March 25, 2018 | Nolan Stevens (C) | 2-year, $1.85 million entry-level contract | |
| March 29, 2018 | Erik Foley (LW) | 3-year, entry-level contract | |
| May 31, 2018 | Niko Mikkola (D) | 2-year, entry-level contract | |

== Draft picks ==
Below are the St. Louis Blues' selections at the 2017 NHL entry draft, which was held on June 23–24, 2017 at the United Center in Chicago.

| Round | # | Player | Pos | Nationality | College/Junior/Club team (League) |
|---|---|---|---|---|---|
| 1 | 20 | Robert Thomas | C | Canada | London Knights (OHL) |
| 1 | 31^{1} | Klim Kostin | RW | Russia | Dynamo Moscow (KHL) |
| 4 | 113 | Alexei Toropchenko | RW | Russia | HK MVD Balashikha (MHL) |
| 5 | 130^{2} | David Noel | D | Canada | Val-d'Or Foreurs (QMJHL) |
| 6 | 175 | Trenton Bourque | D | Canada | Owen Sound Attack (OHL) |
| 7 | 206 | Anton Andersson | D | Sweden | Luleå HF (J20 SuperElit) |

Notes

1. The Pittsburgh Penguins' first-round pick went to the St. Louis Blues as the result of a trade on June 23, 2017, that sent Ryan Reaves and a second-round pick in 2017 (51st overall) to Pittsburgh in exchange for Oskar Sundqvist and this pick.
2. The Buffalo Sabres' fifth-round pick went to the St. Louis Blues as the result of a trade on July 2, 2016, that sent Anders Nilsson to Buffalo in exchange for this pick.
