= 2017–18 Pittsburgh Penguins season =

NHL team season

2017–18 Pittsburgh Penguins
- Division: 2nd Metropolitan
- Conference: 5th Eastern
- 2017–18 record: 47–29–6
- Home record: 30–9–2
- Road record: 17–20–4
- Goals for: 272
- Goals against: 250

Team information
- General manager: Jim Rutherford
- Coach: Mike Sullivan
- Captain: Sidney Crosby
- Alternate captains: Kris Letang; Evgeni Malkin
- Arena: PPG Paints Arena
- Average attendance: 18,579
- Minor league affiliates: Wilkes-Barre/Scranton Penguins (AHL); Wheeling Nailers (ECHL)

Team leaders
- Goals: Evgeni Malkin (42)
- Assists: Sidney Crosby (60)
- Points: Evgeni Malkin (98)
- Penalty minutes: Evgeni Malkin (87)
- Plus/minus: Justin Schultz (+20)
- Wins: Matt Murray (27)
- Goals against average: Casey DeSmith (2.40)

The 2017–18 Pittsburgh Penguins season was the fifty-first season for the National Hockey League ice hockey team that was established on June 5, 1967. It entered the season as two-time defending Stanley Cup champions. The Penguins entered this season as the longest active playoffs streak in the NHL after the Detroit Red Wings missed the playoffs for the first time in 25 years last season. To date, this is the most recent season in which the Penguins won a playoff series.

== Background ==
This was the first season since the 2002–03 season in which the team played without goaltender Marc-Andre Fleury; team leaders had shipped him off to play for the Vegas Golden Knights during the expansion draft.

The team failed to defend its title, after being eliminated in the Second Round of the playoffs by the eventual Stanley Cup champion Washington Capitals. This also ended the team's chances of a possible three-peat, which would have been the first three-peat in the NHL since the New York Islanders won four straight from 1980 to 1983. It would also have been the first in a North American professional sports league since the NBA’s Los Angeles Lakers from 2000 to 2002.

== Standings ==
Metropolitan Division
Pos	Team	GP	W	L	OTL	ROW	GF	GA	GD	Pts
1	y – Washington Capitals	82	49	26	7	46	259	239	+20	105
2	x – Pittsburgh Penguins	82	47	29	6	45	272	250	+22	100
3	x – Philadelphia Flyers	82	42	26	14	40	251	243	+8	98
4	x – Columbus Blue Jackets	82	45	30	7	39	242	230	+12	97
5	x – New Jersey Devils	82	44	29	9	39	248	244	+4	97
6	Carolina Hurricanes	82	36	35	11	33	228	256	−28	83
7	New York Islanders	82	35	37	10	32	264	296	−32	80
8	New York Rangers	82	34	39	9	31	231	268	−37	77

Source: National Hockey League
x – Clinched playoff spot; y – Clinched division

== Schedule and results ==
=== Preseason ===
The preseason schedule was released on June 19, 2017.

2017 preseason game log: 3–3–1 (Home: 2–2–0; Road: 1–1–1)

#	Date	Visitor	Score	Home	Location	Attendance	Record
1	September 19	Pittsburgh	3–4 OT	Buffalo	Pegula Ice Arena	—	0–0–1
2	September 20	Detroit	5–6 OT	Pittsburgh	PPG Paints Arena	17,784	1–0–1
3	September 22	Pittsburgh	4–3	Columbus	Nationwide Arena	12,115	2–0–1
4	September 24	St. Louis	4–1	Pittsburgh	UPMC Lemieux Sports Complex	1,500	2–1–1
5	September 25	Pittsburgh	1–4	Detroit	Little Caesars Arena	16,770	2–2–1
6	September 27	Buffalo	4–5	Pittsburgh	PPG Paints Arena	17,693	3–2–1
7	September 30	Columbus	3–0	Pittsburgh	PPG Paints Arena	18,338	3–3–1

Legend: = Win = Loss = OT/SO Loss

=== Regular season ===
The regular season schedule was published on June 22, 2017.

2017–18 game log
October: 7–5–1 (Home: 4–0–1; Road: 3–5–0), 15 points

#	Date	Visitor	Score	Home	Location	Attendance	Record	Points
1	October 4	St. Louis	5–4 OT	Pittsburgh	PPG Paints Arena	18,652	0–0–1	1
2	October 5	Pittsburgh	1–10	Chicago	United Center	21,705	0–1–1	1
3	October 7	Nashville	0–4	Pittsburgh	PPG Paints Arena	18,645	1–1–1	3
4	October 11	Pittsburgh	3–2	Washington	Capital One Arena	18,506	2–1–1	5
5	October 12	Pittsburgh	4–5	Tampa Bay	Amalie Arena	19,092	2–2–1	5
6	October 14	Florida	3–4	Pittsburgh	PPG Paints Arena	18,582	3–2–1	7
7	October 17	Pittsburgh	5–4 OT	NY Rangers	Madison Square Garden	18,006	4–2–1	9
8	October 20	Pittsburgh	4–3	Florida	BB&T Center	15,756	5–2–1	11
9	October 21	Pittsburgh	1–7	Tampa Bay	Amalie Arena	19,092	5–3–1	11
10	October 24	Edmonton	1–2 OT	Pittsburgh	PPG Paints Arena	18,625	6–3–1	13
11	October 26	Winnipeg	1–2 OT	Pittsburgh	PPG Paints Arena	18,445	7–3–1	15
12	October 28	Pittsburgh	1–2	Minnesota	Xcel Energy Center	19,064	7–4–1	15
13	October 29	Pittsburgh	1–7	Winnipeg	Bell MTS Place	15,321	7–5–1	15

November: 6–5–2 (Home: 4–2–0; Road: 2–3–2), 14 points

#	Date	Visitor	Score	Home	Location	Attendance	Record	Points
14	November 1	Pittsburgh	3–2	Edmonton	Rogers Place	18,347	8–5–1	17
15	November 2	Pittsburgh	1–2 OT	Calgary	Scotiabank Saddledome	18,837	8–5–2	18
16	November 4	Pittsburgh	2–4	Vancouver	Rogers Arena	18,865	8–6–2	18
17	November 7	Arizona	1–3	Pittsburgh	PPG Paints Arena	18,498	9–6–2	20
18	November 10	Pittsburgh	1–4	Washington	Capital One Arena	18,506	9–7–2	20
19	November 11	Pittsburgh	4–5 SO	Nashville	Bridgestone Arena	17,397	9–7–3	21
20	November 14	Buffalo	4–5 OT	Pittsburgh	PPG Paints Arena	18,438	10–7–3	23
21	November 16	Pittsburgh	3–1	Ottawa	Canadian Tire Centre	17,144	11–7–3	25
22	November 18	Chicago	2–1	Pittsburgh	PPG Paints Arena	18,638	11–8–3	25
23	November 22	Vancouver	5–2	Pittsburgh	PPG Paints Arena	18,606	11–9–3	25
24	November 24	Pittsburgh	3–4	Boston	TD Garden	17,565	11–10–3	25
25	November 25	Tampa Bay	2–5	Pittsburgh	PPG Paints Arena	18,659	12–10–3	27
26	November 27	Philadelphia	4–5 OT	Pittsburgh	PPG Paints Arena	18,505	13–10–3	29

December: 6–8–0 (Home: 4–4–0; Road: 2–4–0), 12 points

#	Date	Visitor	Score	Home	Location	Attendance	Record	Points
27	December 1	Pittsburgh	4–0	Buffalo	KeyBank Center	19,070	14–10–3	31
28	December 2	Buffalo	1–5	Pittsburgh	PPG Paints Arena	18,582	15–10–3	33
29	December 5	NY Rangers	4–3	Pittsburgh	PPG Paints Arena	18,414	15–11–3	33
30	December 7	NY Islanders	3–4 OT	Pittsburgh	PPG Paints Arena	18,433	16–11–3	35
31	December 9	Toronto	4–3	Pittsburgh	PPG Paints Arena	18,658	16–12–3	35
32	December 11	Colorado	2–1	Pittsburgh	PPG Paints Arena	18,411	16–13–3	35
33	December 14	Pittsburgh	1–2	Vegas	T-Mobile Arena	18,029	16–14–3	35
34	December 16	Pittsburgh	4–2	Arizona	Gila River Arena	13,051	17–14–3	37
35	December 18	Pittsburgh	2–4	Colorado	Pepsi Center	15,824	17–15–3	37
36	December 21	Columbus	2–3 SO	Pittsburgh	PPG Paints Arena	18,625	18–15–3	39
37	December 23	Anaheim	4–0	Pittsburgh	PPG Paints Arena	18,622	18–16–3	39
38	December 27	Columbus	4–5 SO	Pittsburgh	PPG Paints Arena	18,652	19–16–3	41
39	December 29	Pittsburgh	1–2	Carolina	PNC Arena	17,975	19–17–3	41
40	December 31	Pittsburgh	1–4	Detroit	Little Caesars Arena	19,515	19–18–3	41

January: 9–3–0 (Home: 6–1–0; Road: 3–2–0), 18 points

#	Date	Visitor	Score	Home	Location	Attendance	Record	Points
41	January 2	Pittsburgh	5–1	Philadelphia	Wells Fargo Center	19,558	20–18–3	43
42	January 4	Carolina	4–0	Pittsburgh	PPG Paints Arena	18,595	20–19–3	43
43	January 5	Pittsburgh	4–0	NY Islanders	Barclays Center	13,641	21–19–3	45
44	January 7	Boston	5–6 OT	Pittsburgh	PPG Paints Arena	18,553	22–19–3	47
45	January 13	Detroit	1–4	Pittsburgh	PPG Paints Arena	18,637	23–19–3	49
46	January 14	NY Rangers	2–5	Pittsburgh	PPG Paints Arena	18,647	24–19–3	51
47	January 17	Pittsburgh	3–5	Anaheim	Honda Center	17,291	24–20–3	51
48	January 18	Pittsburgh	3–1	Los Angeles	Staples Center	18,230	25–20–3	53
49	January 20	Pittsburgh	1–2	San Jose	SAP Center	17,562	25–21–3	53
50	January 23	Carolina	1–3	Pittsburgh	PPG Paints Arena	18,421	26–21–3	55
51	January 25	Minnesota	3–6	Pittsburgh	PPG Paints Arena	18,453	27–21–3	57
52	January 30	San Jose	2–5	Pittsburgh	PPG Paints Arena	18,469	28–21–3	59

February: 8–3–1 (Home: 5–1–0; Road: 3–2–1), 17 points

#	Date	Visitor	Score	Home	Location	Attendance	Record	Points
53	February 2	Washington	4–7	Pittsburgh	PPG Paints Arena	18,652	29–21–3	61
54	February 3	Pittsburgh	1–3	New Jersey	Prudential Center	16,514	29–22–3	61
55	February 6	Vegas	4–5	Pittsburgh	PPG Paints Arena	18,644	30–22–3	63
56	February 9	Pittsburgh	3–4 SO	Dallas	American Airlines Center	18,532	30–22–4	64
57	February 11	Pittsburgh	4–1	St. Louis	Scottrade Center	18,975	31–22–4	66
58	February 13	Ottawa	3–6	Pittsburgh	PPG Paints Arena	18,448	32–22–4	68
59	February 15	Los Angeles	1–3	Pittsburgh	PPG Paints Arena	18,604	33–22–4	70
60	February 17	Toronto	3–5	Pittsburgh	PPG Paints Arena	18,647	34–22–4	72
61	February 18	Pittsburgh	5–2	Columbus	Nationwide Arena	19,100	35–22–4	74
62	February 23	Pittsburgh	6–1	Carolina	PNC Arena	18,180	36–22–4	76
63	February 24	Pittsburgh	5–6	Florida	BB&T Center	17,581	36–23–4	76
64	February 27	New Jersey	3–2	Pittsburgh	PPG Paints Arena	18,581	36–24–4	76

March: 9–4–2 (Home: 6–0–1; Road: 3–4–1), 20 points

#	Date	Visitor	Score	Home	Location	Attendance	Record	Points
65	March 1	Pittsburgh	4–8	Boston	TD Garden	17,565	36–25–4	76
66	March 3	NY Islanders	2–3 OT	Pittsburgh	PPG Paints Arena	18,661	37–25–4	78
67	March 5	Calgary	3–4 OT	Pittsburgh	PPG Paints Arena	18,630	38–25–4	80
68	March 7	Pittsburgh	5–2	Philadelphia	Wells Fargo Center	19,624	39–25–4	82
69	March 10	Pittsburgh	2–5	Toronto	Air Canada Centre	19,504	39–26–4	82
70	March 11	Dallas	1–3	Pittsburgh	PPG Paints Arena	18,637	40–26–4	84
71	March 14	Pittsburgh	3–4 OT	NY Rangers	Madison Square Garden	17,379	40–26–5	85
72	March 15	Pittsburgh	5–3	Montreal	Bell Centre	21,302	41–26–5	87
73	March 20	Pittsburgh	1–4	NY Islanders	Barclays Center	10,442	41–27–5	87
74	March 21	Montreal	3–5	Pittsburgh	PPG Paints Arena	18,574	42–27–5	89
75	March 23	New Jersey	4–3 OT	Pittsburgh	PPG Paints Arena	18,658	42–27–6	90
76	March 25	Philadelphia	4–5 OT	Pittsburgh	PPG Paints Arena	18,655	43–27–6	92
77	March 27	Pittsburgh	2–5	Detroit	Little Caesars Arena	19,515	43–28–6	92
78	March 29	Pittsburgh	4–3 OT	New Jersey	Prudential Center	16,514	44–28–6	94
79	March 31	Montreal	2–5	Pittsburgh	PPG Paints Arena	18,636	45–28–6	96

April: 2–1–0 (Home: 1–1–0; Road: 1–0–0), 4 points

#	Date	Visitor	Score	Home	Location	Attendance	Record	Points
80	April 1	Washington	3–1	Pittsburgh	PPG Paints Arena	18,639	45–29–6	96
81	April 5	Pittsburgh	5–4 OT	Columbus	Nationwide Arena	19,157	46–29–6	98
82	April 6	Ottawa	0–4	Pittsburgh	PPG Paints Arena	18,633	47–29–6	100

Legend: = Win = Loss = OT/SO Loss

=== Detailed records ===
Final

Eastern Conference
Atlantic	GP	W	L	OT	SHOTS	GF	GA	PP	PK	FO W–L
Boston Bruins	3	1	2	0	81–96	13	17	3–8	3–9	97–106
Buffalo Sabres	3	3	0	0	99–99	14	5	2–12	2–11	102–83
Detroit Red Wings	3	1	2	0	98–79	7	10	3–10	2–10	101–84
Florida Panthers	3	2	1	0	118–107	13	12	5–8	1–10	79–110
Montreal Canadiens	3	3	0	0	111–76	15	8	6–10	2–5	106–85
Ottawa Senators	3	3	0	0	80–90	13	4	2–9	1–9	88–101
Tampa Bay Lightning	3	1	2	0	103–101	10	14	5–14	6–16	118–100
Toronto Maple Leafs	3	1	2	0	115–83	10	12	1–8	3–5	97–102
Division total	24	15	9	0	774–698	95	82	27–79	20–75	788–771

Metropolitan	GP	W	L	OT	SHOTS	GF	GA	PP	PK	FO W–L
Carolina Hurricanes	4	2	2	0	121–129	10	8	1–6	0–7	123–114
Columbus Blue Jackets	4	4	0	0	144–132	16	12	6–12	2–12	138–133
New Jersey Devils	4	1	2	1	132–141	10	13	0–7	3–9	136–123
New York Islanders	4	3	1	0	157–124	12	9	4–8	1–15	115–131
New York Rangers	4	2	1	1	164–122	16	14	2–12	4–12	119–111
Philadelphia Flyers	4	4	0	0	137–133	20	11	5–13	2–16	104–133
Pittsburgh Penguins										
Washington Capitals	4	2	2	0	140–120	12	13	6–19	2–18	121–138
Division total	28	18	8	2	993–901	95	80	24–77	14–89	856–883
Conference total	52	33	17	2	1747–1598	191	162	51–156	34–164	1644–1657

Western Conference
Central	GP	W	L	OT	SHOTS	GF	GA	PP	PK	FO W–L
Chicago Blackhawks	2	0	2	0	65–82	2	12	1–5	2–11	72–68
Colorado Avalanche	2	0	2	0	76–65	3	6	0–6	1–8	51–56
Dallas Stars	2	1	0	1	67–54	6	4	1–7	1–7	50–70
Minnesota Wild	2	1	1	0	69–55	7	5	3–5	1–9	58–55
Nashville Predators	2	1	0	1	64–54	8	4	0–9	2–11	60–71
St. Louis Blues	2	1	0	1	56–68	8	6	1–7	1–7	70–66
Winnipeg Jets	2	1	1	0	68–55	3	8	1–7	1–5	62–58
Division total	14	5	6	3	425–395	36	43	7–43	7–53	383–415

Pacific	GP	W	L	OT	SHOTS	GF	GA	PP	PK	FO W–L
Anaheim Ducks	2	0	2	0	62–56	3	9	2–6	1–4	60–57
Arizona Coyotes	2	2	0	0	70–42	7	3	1–10	0–3	64–55
Calgary Flames	2	1	0	1	76–72	5	5	0–3	1–6	61–60
Edmonton Oilers	2	2	0	0	74–67	5	3	2–7	1–7	65–56
Los Angeles Kings	2	2	0	0	70–64	6	2	2–9	1–5	57–54
San Jose Sharks	2	1	1	0	63–78	6	4	0–6	3–8	68–57
Vancouver Canucks	2	0	2	0	84–58	4	9	3–9	2–5	63–65
Vegas Golden Knights	2	1	1	0	63–51	6	6	0–8	1–5	66–44
Division total	16	9	6	1	562–488	42	41	10–58	10–41	504–448
Conference total	30	14	11	4	987–883	79	84	17–101	15–96	887–863
NHL total	82	47	29	6	2787–2479	270	246	68–257	49–260	2528–2517

== Playoffs ==
=== Game log ===
2018 Stanley Cup playoffs
Eastern Conference First Round vs. (M3) Philadelphia Flyers: Penguins won 4–2

#	Date	Visitor	Score	Home	OT	Decision	Attendance	Series	Recap
1	April 11	Philadelphia	0–7	Pittsburgh		Murray	18,556	1–0	Recap
2	April 13	Philadelphia	5–1	Pittsburgh		Murray	18,648	1–1	Recap
3	April 15	Pittsburgh	5–1	Philadelphia		Murray	19,955	2–1	Recap
4	April 18	Pittsburgh	5–0	Philadelphia		Murray	19,644	3–1	Recap
5	April 20	Philadelphia	4–2	Pittsburgh		Murray	18,632	3–2	Recap
6	April 22	Pittsburgh	8–5	Philadelphia		Murray	19,861	4–2	Recap

Eastern Conference Second Round vs. (M1) Washington Capitals: Capitals won 4–2

#	Date	Visitor	Score	Home	OT	Decision	Attendance	Series	Recap
1	April 26	Pittsburgh	3–2	Washington		Murray	18,506	1–0	Recap
2	April 29	Pittsburgh	1–4	Washington		Murray	18,506	1–1	Recap
3	May 1	Washington	4–3	Pittsburgh		Murray	18,634	1–2	Recap
4	May 3	Washington	1–3	Pittsburgh		Murray	18,650	2–2	Recap
5	May 5	Pittsburgh	3–6	Washington		Murray	18,506	2–3	Recap
6	May 7	Washington	2–1	Pittsburgh	OT	Murray	18,621	2–4	Recap

Legend: = Win = Loss = Playoff series win

== Player statistics ==
Skaters

Regular season
Player	GP	G	A	Pts	+/−	PIM
Evgeni Malkin	78	42	56	98	16	87
Phil Kessel	82	34	58	92	-4	36
Sidney Crosby	82	29	60	89	0	46
Kris Letang	79	9	42	51	-9	56
Patric Hornqvist	70	29	20	49	2	58
Jake Guentzel	82	22	26	48	-9	42
Bryan Rust	69	13	25	38	11	26
Riley Sheahan^{†}	73	11	21	32	4	4
Carl Hagelin	81	10	21	31	8	28
Conor Sheary	79	18	12	30	2	10
Olli Maatta	82	7	22	29	-1	28
Justin Schultz	63	4	23	27	22	14
Brian Dumoulin	80	5	13	18	-5	30
Jamie Oleksiak^{†}	47	4	10	14	13	69
Ian Cole^{‡}	47	3	10	13	3	52
Dominik Simon	33	4	8	12	2	16
Matt Hunwick	42	4	6	10	-4	21
Ryan Reaves^{‡}	58	4	4	8	-9	84
Derick Brassard^{†}	14	3	5	8	1	4
Tom Kuhnhackl	69	2	6	8	-6	6
Zach Aston-Reese	16	4	2	6	2	2
Carter Rowney	44	2	3	5	-13	4
Chad Ruhwedel	44	2	3	5	-8	16
Greg McKegg	26	2	2	4	-4	8
Daniel Sprong	8	2	1	3	2	0
Zach Trotman	3	0	0	0	-3	0
Scott Wilson	3	0	0	0	-2	0
Frank Corrado	5	0	0	0	-1	2
Josh Archibald	3	0	0	0	0	0
Josh Jooris	9	0	0	0	0	0
Total		269	459	728	—	749

Playoffs
Player	GP	G	A	Pts	+/−	PIM
Jake Guentzel	12	10	11	21	10	8
Sidney Crosby	12	9	12	21	7	6
Patric Hornqvist	10	5	6	11	-2	22
Kris Letang	12	3	8	11	0	15
Phil Kessel	12	1	8	9	-5	2
Evgeni Malkin	9	4	4	8	-7	16
Justin Schultz	12	1	7	8	5	2
Brian Dumoulin	12	1	6	7	3	2
Derick Brassard	12	1	3	4	-1	4
Bryan Rust	12	3	0	3	2	4
Carl Hagelin	9	2	1	3	1	2
Riley Sheahan	12	1	2	3	-2	2
Dominik Simon	8	0	3	3	0	4
Olli Maatta	12	0	2	2	8	4
Conor Sheary	12	0	2	2	-2	2
Jamie Oleksiak	12	1	0	1	-2	7
Zach Aston-Reese	9	0	1	1	-1	4
Tom Kuhnhackl	12	0	0	0	0	4
Carter Rowney	3	0	0	0	0	0
Chad Ruhwedel	12	0	0	0	-2	2
Total		42	76	118	—	112

Goaltenders

Regular season
Player	GP	GS	TOI	W	L	OT	GA	GAA	SA	SV%	SO	G	A	PIM
Matt Murray	49	45	2732:58	27	16	3	133	2.92	1423	0.907	1	0	1	2
Tristan Jarry	26	23	1363:56	14	6	2	63	2.77	687	0.908	2	0	2	4
Casey DeSmith	14	11	700:09	6	4	1	28	2.4	356	0.921	1	0	0	2
Antti Niemi^{‡}	3	3	128:08	0	3	0	16	7.49	79	0.797	0	0	1	0
Total		82	4925:11	47	29	6	240	2.92	2545	0.906	4	0	4	8

Playoffs
Player	GP	GS	TOI	W	L	OT	GA	GAA	SA	SV%	SO	G	A	PIM
Matt Murray	12	12	715:35	6	6	--	29	2.43	314	0.908	2	0	0	0
Total		12	715:35	6	6	0	29	2.43	314	0.908	2	0	0	0

^{†}Denotes player spent time with another team before joining the Penguins. Stats reflect time with the Penguins only.
^{‡}Denotes player was traded mid-season. Stats reflect time with the Penguins only.

== Notable achievements ==
- Kris Letang set the franchise record for career assists by a defenseman with 341. He broke the previous record of 332 held by Paul Coffey on March 3 against the New York Islanders.

=== Awards ===
Regular season
Player	Award	Awarded
S. Crosby	NHL Third Star of the Week	January 8, 2018
P. Kessel	NHL Third Star of the Week	January 15, 2018
E. Malkin	NHL First Star of the Month	February 1, 2018
E. Malkin	NHL First Star of the Week	February 5, 2018
E. Malkin	NHL Second Star of the Month	March 1, 2018
E. Malkin	NHL Third Star of the Week	March 12, 2018

=== Team awards ===
Awarded week of April 1

Player	Award	Notes
Kris Letang	Bill Masterton Memorial Trophy nominee	The Pittsburgh Chapter of the Professional Hockey Writers Association votes for the Penguins' Masterton nominee. Each NHL team selects a Masterton candidate from which the overall winner is chosen. The Masterton candidate is nominated as the player who best exemplifies the qualities of perseverance, sportsmanship and dedication to hockey. Sponsor: Verizon Wireless
Sidney Crosby	Player's Player Award	The players hold a vote at the end of the season for the player they feel exemplifies leadership for the team, both on and off the ice, a player dedicated to teamwork. Sponsor: UPMC
Matt Murray	Edward J. DeBartolo Award	The award recognizes the player who has donated a tremendous amount of time and effort during the season working on community and charity projects. Sponsor: PNC Wealth Management
Evgeni Malkin	Most Valuable Player	Based on the overall contribution the player makes to the team. Sponsor: PPG Paints

=== Milestones ===
Regular season
Player	Milestone	Reached
T. Kuhnhackl	100th career NHL game	October 4, 2017
K. Letang	300th career NHL assist	October 12, 2017
P. Kessel	300th career NHL goal	October 26, 2017
C. DeSmith	1st career NHL game	October 29, 2017
R. Sheahan	300th career NHL game	November 7, 2017
M. Murray	50th career NHL win	November 7, 2017
S. Crosby	800th career NHL game	November 10, 2017
R. Sheahan	100th career NHL point	November 14, 2017
K. Letang	400th career NHL point	November 14, 2017
P. Hornqvist	600th career NHL game	November 25, 2017
T. Jarry	1st career NHL win 1st career NHL assist 1st career NHL point	November 25, 2017
T. Jarry	1st career NHL shutout	December 1, 2017
M. Hunwick	500th career NHL game	December 21, 2017
B. Dumoulin	200th career NHL game	December 23, 2017
P. Hornqvist	200th career NHL assist	December 27, 2017
D. Sprong	1st career NHL assist	January 5, 2018
C. Hagelin	200th career NHL point	January 14, 2018
D. Simon	1st career NHL goal	January 14, 2018
P. Kessel	700th career NHL point	January 14, 2018
C. DeSmith	1st career NHL win	January 18, 2018
J. Dea	1st career NHL goal 1st career NHL point	January 23, 2018
Z. Aston-Reese	1st career NHL game	February 3, 2018
Z. Aston-Reese	1st career NHL assist 1st career NHL point	February 9, 2018
S. Crosby	400th career NHL goal	February 11, 2018
Z. Aston-Reese	1st career NHL goal	February 13, 2018
M. Murray	100th career NHL game	February 15, 2018
J. Guentzel	100th career NHL game	February 17, 2018
E. Malkin	900th career NHL point	February 17, 2018
P. Kessel	400th career NHL assist	March 3, 2018
P. Kessel	900th career NHL game	March 7, 2018
C. Ruhwedel	100th career NHL game	March 7, 2018
S. Crosby	1,100th career NHL point	March 7, 2018
P. Hornqvist	400th career NHL point	March 15, 2018
S. Crosby	700th career NHL assist	March 21, 2018
J. Schultz	400th career NHL game	March 23, 2018
P. Hornqvist	200th career NHL goal	March 31, 2018
O. Maatta	300th career NHL game	April 1, 2018
C. DeSmith	1st career NHL shutout	April 6, 2018

Playoffs
Player	Milestone	Reached
J. Oleksiak	1st career playoff game	April 11, 2018
Z. Aston-Reese	1st career playoff game	April 11, 2018
E. Malkin	100th career playoff assist	April 15, 2018
D. Simon	1st career playoff game 1st career playoff assist 1st career playoff point	April 18, 2018
Z. Aston-Reese	1st career playoff assist 1st career playoff point	April 18, 2018
J. Oleksiak	1st career playoff goal 1st career playoff point	May 5, 2018

== Transactions ==
The Penguins have been involved in the following transactions during the 2017–18 season.

=== Trades ===
June 21, 2017	To Vegas Golden Knights 2nd-round pick in 2020	To Pittsburgh Penguins Expansion Draft considerations^{1}
June 23, 2017	To St. Louis Blues Oskar Sundqvist; 31st overall pick in 1st-round in 2017	To Pittsburgh Penguins Ryan Reaves; 51st overall pick in 2nd-round in 2017
October 3, 2017	To Vancouver Canucks Derrick Pouliot	To Pittsburgh Penguins Andrey Pedan; 4th-round pick in 2018
October 21, 2017	To Detroit Red Wings Scott Wilson; 3rd-round pick in 2018	To Pittsburgh Penguins Riley Sheahan; 5th-round pick in 2018
December 19, 2017	To Arizona Coyotes Josh Archibald; Sean Maguire; 6th-round pick in 2019	To Pittsburgh Penguins Michael Leighton; 4th-round pick in 2019
December 19, 2017	To Dallas Stars conditional 4th-round pick in 2019	To Pittsburgh Penguins Jamie Oleksiak
February 23, 2018	To Ottawa Senators Ian Cole; Filip Gustavsson; 1st-round pick in 2018; 3rd-round pick in 2019	To Pittsburgh Penguins Tobias Lindberg; Vincent Dunn; 3rd-round pick in 2018
February 23, 2018	To Vegas Golden Knights Ryan Reaves; 4th-round pick in 2018	To Pittsburgh Penguins Derick Brassard^{[Note 1]}
February 26, 2018	To Carolina Hurricanes Greg McKegg	To Pittsburgh Penguins Josh Jooris

Notes:

1. The Vegas Golden Knights will select Marc-Andre Fleury in the 2017 NHL expansion draft.
2. ^{Note 1} Vegas to retain 40% ($2 million) of salary as part of trade.

=== Free agents ===
Player	Acquired from	Lost to	Date	Contract terms
Trevor Daley		Detroit Red Wings	July 1, 2017	3-year, $9.534 million
Matt Hunwick	Toronto Maple Leafs		July 1, 2017	3-year, $6.75 million
Antti Niemi	Dallas Stars		July 1, 2017	1-year, $700,000
Ron Hainsey		Toronto Maple Leafs	July 1, 2017	2-year, $6 million
Nick Bonino		Nashville Predators	July 1, 2017	4-year, $16.4 million
Kevin Porter		Buffalo Sabres	July 1, 2017	2-year, $1.3 million
Cameron Gaunce		Columbus Blue Jackets	July 1, 2017	1-year, $650,000
Chris Kunitz		Tampa Bay Lightning	July 1, 2017	1-year, $2 million
Chris Summers	New York Rangers		July 1, 2017	2-year, $1.3 million
Jarred Tinordi	Arizona Coyotes		July 1, 2017	1-year, $650,000
Zach Trotman	Los Angeles Kings		July 1, 2017	1-year, $650,000
Greg McKegg	Tampa Bay Lightning		July 1, 2017	1-year, $650,000
Casey DeSmith	Wilkes-Barre/Scranton Penguins		July 1, 2017	2-year, $1.3 million
David Warsofsky		Colorado Avalanche	July 1, 2017	2-year, $1.35 million
Kevin Czuczman	Manitoba Moose		July 3, 2017	1-year, $650,000
Adam Johnson	Minnesota–Duluth Bulldogs		July 6, 2017	2-year, $1.85 million^{[b]}
Mark Streit		Montreal Canadiens	July 25, 2017	1-year, $700,000
Matt Cullen		Minnesota Wild	August 16, 2017	1-year, $1 million
Tim Erixon		New Jersey Devils	September 7, 2017	Professional Tryout Contract
Alex D'Orio	Saint John Sea Dogs		September 13, 2017	3-year, $2.15 million^{[b]}
Jordy Bellerive	Lethbridge Hurricanes		September 16, 2017	3-year, $2.15 million^{[b]}
Sam Miletic	London Knights		September 25, 2017	3-year, $2.13 million^{[b]}
Stuart Percy		Rochester Americans	October 19, 2017	Professional Tryout Contract
Juuso Riikola	Lukko		May 18, 2018	1-year, $1.775 million^{[b]}
Lukas Bengtsson		Linköpings HC	May 18, 2018	3-year

=== Waivers ===
Player	Claimed from	Lost to	Date
Antti Niemi		Florida Panthers	October 24, 2017

=== Signings ===
Player	Date	Contract terms
Frederik Tiffels	June 22, 2017	2-year, $1.85 million^{[b]}
Chad Ruhwedel	June 22, 2017	2-year, $1.3 million
Garrett Wilson	July 1, 2017	2-year, $1.3 million
Justin Schultz	July 1, 2017	3-year, $16.5 million
Tom Sestito	July 1, 2017	1-year, $650,000^{[a]}
Frank Corrado	July 1, 2017	1-year, $650,000^{[a]}
Derrick Pouliot	July 12, 2017	1-year, $800,000
Josh Archibald	July 12, 2017	2-year, $1.35 million
Brian Dumoulin	July 24, 2017	6-year, $24.6 million
Conor Sheary	July 30, 2017	3-year, $9 million
Jean-Sebastien Dea	August 21, 2017	1-year, $650,000^{[a]}
Patric Hornqvist	February 27, 2018	5-year, $26.5 million (contract extension)
Sam Lafferty	March 7, 2018	2-year, $1.85 million^{[b]}
Dane Birks	March 28, 2018	2-year, $1.6 million^{[b]}
Anthony Angello	April 6, 2018	2-year, $1.85 million^{[b]}
Linus Olund	April 25, 2018	3-year, $2.775 million^{[b]}
Tobias Lindberg	June 19, 2018	1-year, $650,000^{[a]} (contract extension)

Notes

- ^{a} – Two-way contract
- ^{b} – Entry-level contract

== Draft picks ==
Below are the Pittsburgh Penguins' selections at the 2017 NHL entry draft, which was held on June 23 and 24, 2017 at the United Center in Chicago.

Round	#	Player	Pos	Nationality	College/Junior/Club team (League)
2	51^{1}	Zachary Lauzon	D	Canada	Rouyn-Noranda Huskies (QMJHL)
3	93	Clayton Phillips	D	United States	Fargo Force (USHL)
5	152^{2}	Jan Drozg	LW	Slovenia	Leksands IF J18 (J18 Elit)
5	155	Linus Olund	C	Sweden	Brynäs IF (SHL)
6	186	Antti Palojarvi	D	Finland	Lukko U20 (Jr. A SM-liiga)
7	217	William Reilly	D	Canada	RPI (ECAC)

Draft notes:

1. The St. Louis Blues' second-round pick went to the Pittsburgh Penguins as the result of a trade on June 23, 2017, that sent Oskar Sundqvist and a first-round pick in 2017 (31st overall) to St. Louis in exchange for Ryan Reaves and this pick.
2. The Ottawa Senators' fifth-round pick went to the Pittsburgh Penguins as the result of a trade on November 2, 2016, that Mike Condon to Ottawa exchange for this pick.
