= Antti Palojärvi =

Finnish ice hockey player

- Born: 18 January 1999 (age 27) Kouvola, Finland
- Height: 6 ft 1 in (185 cm)
- Weight: 172 lb (78 kg; 12 st 4 lb)
- Position: Defence
- Shot: Left
- Played for: Lukko
- NHL draft: 186th overall, 2017; Pittsburgh Penguins
- Playing career: 2017–2023

Antti Palojärvi (born 18 January 1999) is a Finnish professional ice hockey defenceman for KooKoo of the Liiga.

== Playing career ==
He was selected by the Pittsburgh Penguins in the sixth round, 186th overall, of the 2017 NHL entry draft.

Palojärvi made his Liiga debut with Lukko during the 2018–19 season. He appeared in 16 games at the top level, recording 2 assists, before he was loaned for the remainder of the season to second-tier club, SaPKo of the Mestis, on 28 January 2019.

On 9 June 2020, Palojärvi left Lukko, signing an optional two-year contract with his original youth club, KooKoo of the Liiga.

== Career statistics ==
			Regular season					Playoffs
Season	Team	League	GP	G	A	Pts	PIM	GP	G	A	Pts	PIM
2015–16	KooKoo	Jr. A	1	0	0	0	0	—	—	—	—	—
2016–17	Lukko	Jr. A	47	1	10	11	14	8	1	1	2	0
2016–17	KeuPa HT	Mestis	1	0	0	0	0	—	—	—	—	—
2017–18	Lukko	Jr. A	44	2	10	12	16	—	—	—	—	—
2018–19	Lukko	Jr. A	29	4	9	13	10	—	—	—	—	—
2018–19	Lukko	Liiga	16	0	2	2	4	—	—	—	—	—
2018–19	SaPKo	Mestis	7	1	2	3	0	5	0	2	2	0
2019–20	Lukko	Jr. A	14	0	3	3	6	—	—	—	—	—
2019–20	Lukko	Liiga	5	0	0	0	0	—	—	—	—	—
2019–20	Hokki	Mestis	24	0	0	0	8	—	—	—	—	—
Liiga totals			21	0	2	2	4	—	—	—	—	—
