= Mitch Reinke =

American ice hockey player

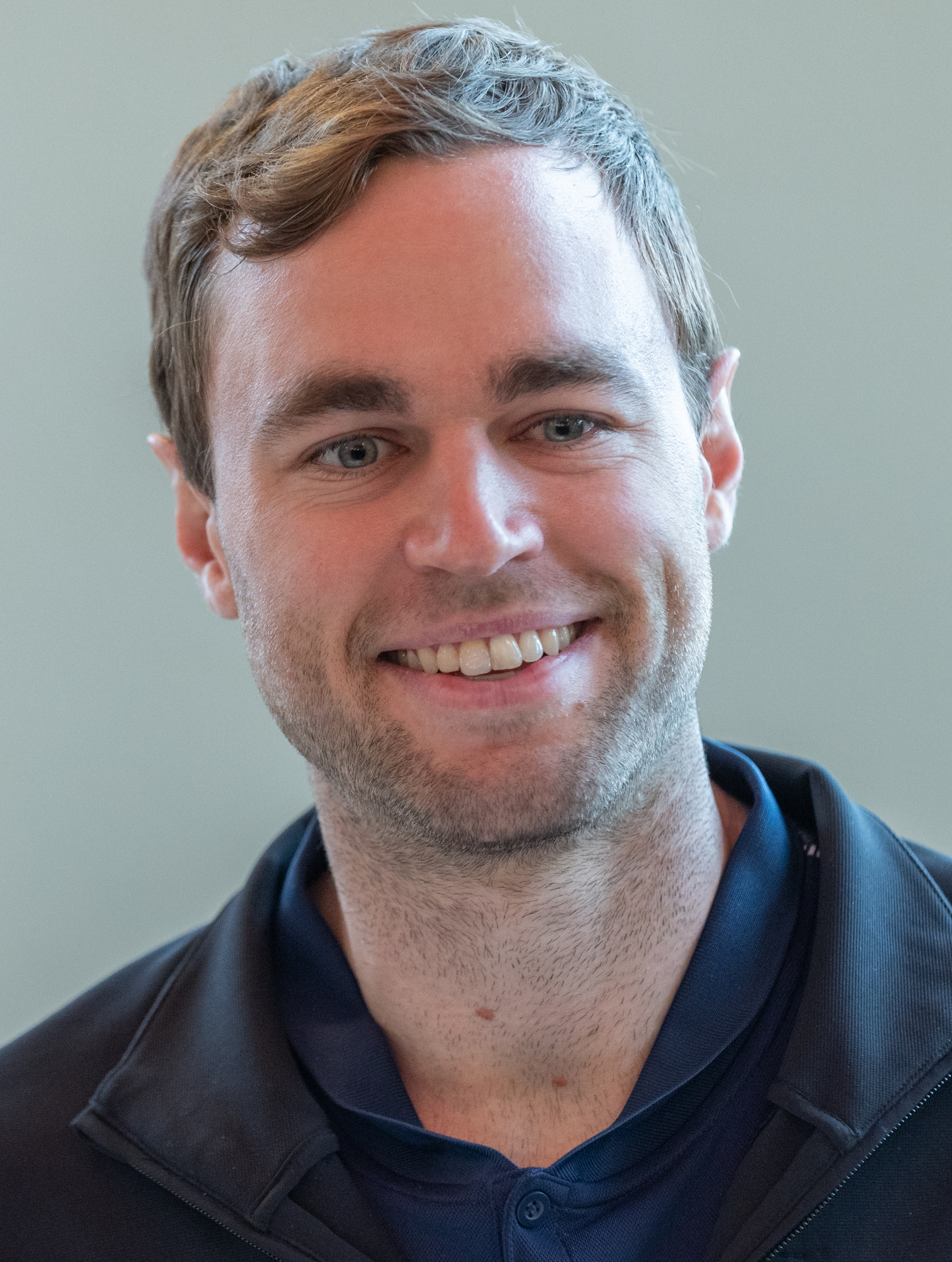
- Reinke with the Eisbären Berlin in 2026
- Born: February 4, 1996 (age 30) Stillwater, Minnesota, U.S.
- Height: 5 ft 11 in (180 cm)
- Weight: 181 lb (82 kg; 12 st 13 lb)
- Position: Defense
- Shoots: Right
- DEL team Former teams: Eisbären Berlin; St. Louis Blues
- NHL draft: Undrafted
- Playing career: 2018–present

Mitchell Jon Reinke (born February 4, 1996) is an American professional ice hockey defenseman who is currently playing under contract with the Eisbären Berlin in the Deutsche Eishockey Liga (DEL). He has formerly played with the St. Louis Blues in the National Hockey League (NHL).

== Early life ==
Reinke was born on February 4, 1996, in St. Paul, Minnesota, to parents Chris and Mickie Reinke. He came from an athletic family as his father played hockey at Hamline University and his sister played soccer at the University of Minnesota. He also has another sister, Kelsey. Upon graduating from Hamline, his father became a masters division world championship boxer.

== Playing career ==
Reinke attended Stillwater High before playing junior hockey with the Cedar Rapids RoughRiders of the United States Hockey League (USHL).

He committed to play collegiate hockey with Michigan Tech of the Western Collegiate Hockey Association (WCHA). In his freshman season in 2016–17 season, Reinke developed a scoring touch and sound defensive game with 20 points in 41 games to earn a selection to the WCHA All-Rookie Team.

In the following 2017–18 season, Reinke notched a new career high with 24 points in 35 games before opting to end his collegiate career after his sophomore year, signing as an undrafted free agent to a two-year, entry-level contract with the St. Louis Blues on March 26, 2018. Reinke was immediately added to the Blues roster and made his NHL debut with the Blues in a 6–0 defeat to the Arizona Coyotes on March 31, 2018.

After spending his first three full professional seasons within the Blues organization, Reinke was not tendered a qualifying offer, leading to him being released to free agency. On September 2, 2021, he was signed to a one-year contract to continue in the AHL with the Wilkes-Barre/Scranton Penguins, the primary affiliate to the Pittsburgh Penguins.

Following two productive seasons within the Penguins organization, Reinke was rewarded with an NHL contract as a free agent, signing a one-year, two-way deal with the Seattle Kraken on September 2, 2023.

Having played his first seven professional seasons in North America, Reinke opted to pursue a European career at the conclusion of his contract with the Kraken, signing a one-year deal with German club Eisbären Berlin of the DEL, on July 16, 2024.

== Career statistics ==
			Regular season					Playoffs
Season	Team	League	GP	G	A	Pts	PIM	GP	G	A	Pts	PIM
2011–12	Stillwater High	USHS	21	2	10	12	0	2	0	0	0	0
2012–13	Stillwater High	USHS	23	3	11	14	8	2	0	1	1	0
2013–14	Stillwater High	USHS	23	5	14	19	12	3	0	0	0	2
2014–15	Cedar Rapids RoughRiders	USHL	55	2	19	21	10	3	0	0	0	0
2015–16	Cedar Rapids RoughRiders	USHL	56	5	25	30	22	5	1	1	2	6
2016–17	Michigan Tech	WCHA	41	6	14	20	20	—	—	—	—	—
2017–18	Michigan Tech	WCHA	35	3	21	24	31	—	—	—	—	—
2017–18	St. Louis Blues	NHL	1	0	0	0	0	—	—	—	—	—
2018–19	San Antonio Rampage	AHL	76	12	33	45	20	—	—	—	—	—
2019–20	San Antonio Rampage	AHL	46	5	17	22	20	—	—	—	—	—
2020–21	Utica Comets	AHL	18	2	10	12	2	—	—	—	—	—
2020–21	St. Louis Blues	NHL	—	—	—	—	—	1	0	0	0	0
2021–22	Wilkes-Barre/Scranton Penguins	AHL	63	3	24	27	6	6	0	3	3	2
2022–23	Wilkes-Barre/Scranton Penguins	AHL	52	1	26	27	8	—	—	—	—	—
2023–24	Coachella Valley Firebirds	AHL	25	1	4	5	12	—	—	—	—	—
2024–25	Eisbären Berlin	DEL	22	1	11	12	8	—	—	—	—	—
NHL totals			1	0	0	0	0	1	0	0	0	0

== Awards and honors ==
Award	Year
USHL
All-Rookie Second Team	2015
College
WCHA All-Rookie Team	2016–17
All-WCHA Third Team	2017–18
AHL
All-Rookie Team	2018–19
DEL
Champion (Eisbären Berlin)	2025
