= Brandon Crawley =

American ice hockey player (born 1997)

- Born: February 2, 1997 (age 29) Glen Rock, New Jersey, US
- Height: 6 ft 1 in (185 cm)
- Weight: 205 lb (93 kg; 14 st 9 lb)
- Position: Defense
- Shot: Left
- Played for: Hartford Wolf Pack; Cleveland Monsters; Syracuse Crunch
- NHL draft: 123rd overall, 2017 NHL Draft
- Playing career: 2017–2022

Brandon Crawley (born February 2, 1997) is an American former professional ice hockey player. He was drafted 123rd overall by the New York Rangers in the 2017 NHL Draft and played four seasons in the Rangers organization.

Raised in Glen Rock, New Jersey, he played prep hockey at Bergen Catholic High School. He played for the London Knights of the Ontario Hockey League for three seasons for them, he was drafted in the 4th round of the 2017 NHL Draft to the New York Rangers.

He played a preseason game for the Rangers, scoring a goal on September 23, 2017, in a 2–1 loss against the New Jersey Devils.

He signed his entry-level contract with the Rangers on October 2, 2017.

In 2018, Crawley was in an Uber vehicle that crashed. The resulting head injuries caused vision issues that effectively ended his hockey career. He filed suit against both Uber and the driver in 2020 and in a February 2026 decision was awarded $19 million in damages for his injuries and loss of income, plus legal fees.

== Career statistics ==
			Regular season					Playoffs
Season	Team	League	GP	G	A	Pts	PIM	GP	G	A	Pts	PIM
2014–15	London Knights	OHL	64	3	13	16	86	0	0	0	0	0
2015–16	London Knights	OHL	62	6	12	18	99	0	0	0	0	0
2016–17	London Knights	OHL	61	7	20	27	114	0	0	0	0	0
2017–18	Hartford Wolf Pack	AHL	64	2	3	5	99	—	—	—	—	—
2018–19	Hartford Wolf Pack	AHL	50	3	12	15	111	0	0	0	0	0
2019–20	Hartford Wolf Pack	AHL	9	0	0	0	6	—	—	—	—	—
2019–20	Maine Mariners	ECHL	38	2	10	12	36	0	0	0	0	0
2021–22	Hartford Wolf Pack	AHL	7	0	0	0	6	0	0	0	0	0
2020–21	Cleveland Monsters	AHL	13	0	1	1	23	0	0	0	0	0
2021–22	Syracuse Crunch	AHL	2	0	0	0	0	—	—	—	—	—
AHL totals			145	5	16	21	0	0	0	0	0	0
