= Wade Megan =

American ice hockey player (born 1990)

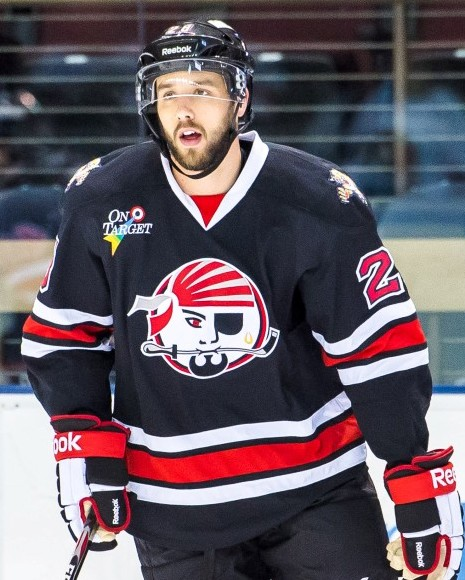
- Megan in 2015
- Born: July 22, 1990 (age 36) Canton, New York, U.S.
- Height: 6 ft 1 in (185 cm)
- Weight: 192 lb (87 kg; 13 st 10 lb)
- Position: Center
- Shot: Left
- Played for: St. Louis Blues; Detroit Red Wings
- NHL draft: 138th overall, 2009; Florida Panthers
- Playing career: 2013–2019

Wade Megan (born July 22, 1990) is an American former professional ice hockey center who played in the National Hockey League (NHL) with the St. Louis Blues and the Detroit Red Wings.

== Playing career ==
Originally chosen by the Florida Panthers in the 2009 entry draft, Megan played collegiate hockey with Boston University in the Hockey East. Unable to secure an NHL contract with the Panthers, Megan signed his first professional deal with Florida's AHL affiliate, the San Antonio Rampage to begin the 2013–14 season on September 20, 2013.

After three years within the Panthers AHL affiliates, Megan left as a free agent and secured his first NHL deal, on a one-year, two-way deal with the St. Louis Blues on July 2, 2016. Upon participating in his first training camp with the Blues, Megan was reassigned to start the 2016–17 season, with the Chicago Wolves. On December 22, 2016, Megan received his first recall to the NHL. He made his NHL debut that night against the Tampa Bay Lightning, becoming the first National Hockey League player from the city of Canton, New York. He scored his first NHL goal in the first period in a 5–2 defeat to the Lightning. He was returned to the Wolves following the game.

On July 1, 2018, the Detroit Red Wings signed Megan as a free agent to a one-year, two-way contract. On October 31, 2018, Megan was recalled by the Red Wings. Before being recalled, he recorded two goals and two assists in eight games for the Grand Rapids Griffins.

After his contract with the Red Wings, Megan opted to conclude his six-year professional career, retiring to found the NoCo Hockey camp in Canton, New York, and working as an instructor alongside fellow Canton former pro Kyle Flanagan and coach Mark Phalon.

== Personal life ==
He is the son of former professional hockey player, Ron Megan, who played two seasons in the International Hockey League with the Kalamazoo Wings and Peoria Prancers in 1983 and 84.

== Career statistics ==
			Regular season					Playoffs
Season	Team	League	GP	G	A	Pts	PIM	GP	G	A	Pts	PIM
2007–08	South Kent School	USHS	36	24	27	51	14	—	—	—	—	—
2008–09	South Kent School	USHS	32	27	36	63	18	—	—	—	—	—
2009–10	Boston University	HE	35	5	7	12	22	—	—	—	—	—
2010–11	Boston University	HE	39	8	5	13	32	—	—	—	—	—
2011–12	Boston University	HE	39	20	9	29	57	—	—	—	—	—
2012–13	Boston University	HE	38	16	13	29	50	—	—	—	—	—
2012–13	San Antonio Rampage	AHL	13	1	0	1	0	—	—	—	—	—
2013–14	San Antonio Rampage	AHL	43	11	6	17	18	—	—	—	—	—
2013–14	Cincinnati Cyclones	ECHL	16	13	7	20	11	22	10	3	13	12
2014–15	San Antonio Rampage	AHL	59	8	5	13	44	3	0	0	0	0
2014–15	Cincinnati Cyclones	ECHL	5	4	3	7	12	—	—	—	—	—
2015–16	Portland Pirates	AHL	75	14	9	23	53	5	0	0	0	10
2016–17	Chicago Wolves	AHL	73	33	33	66	57	5	0	1	1	4
2016–17	St. Louis Blues	NHL	3	1	0	1	0	—	—	—	—	—
2017–18	Chicago Wolves	AHL	63	11	22	33	52	3	2	0	2	2
2017–18	St. Louis Blues	NHL	1	0	0	0	0	—	—	—	—	—
2018–19	Grand Rapids Griffins	AHL	48	19	18	37	44	5	2	0	2	16
2018–19	Detroit Red Wings	NHL	11	0	1	1	2	—	—	—	—	—
AHL totals			374	97	93	190	268	21	4	1	5	32
NHL totals			15	1	1	2	2	—	—	—	—	—

== Awards and honors ==
Award	Year	Ref.
AHL
First All-Star Team	2017	
Willie Marshall Award	2017	
