= 2012 World U-17 Hockey Challenge =

Tournament details
- Host country: Canada
- Venue(s): WCFU Centre, Tecumseh Arena, Vollmer Culture and Rec Complex (in 3 host cities)
- Dates: December 29 – January 4
- Teams: 10

The 2012 World Under-17 Hockey Challenge was an ice hockey tournament held in Windsor, Tecumseh and La Salle, Ontario, Canada, between December 29, 2011, and January 4, 2012. The World Under-17 Hockey Challenge is held by Hockey Canada annually to showcase young hockey talent from across Canada and other strong hockey countries. The primary venues used for the tournament were the WCFU Centre in Windsor, Tecumseh Arena in Tecumseh and the Vollmer Culture and Rec Centre in La Salle.

== Challenge results ==
=== Preliminary round ===
==== Group A ====
Team	Pld	W	OTW	OTL	L	GF	GA	GD	Pts
Canada Ontario	4	4	0	0	0	21	4	+17	12
Sweden	4	3	0	0	1	22	14	+8	9
Canada Quebec	4	2	0	0	2	11	15	−4	6
Canada Atlantic	4	1	0	0	3	8	17	−9	3
Germany	4	0	0	0	4	5	17	−12	0

===== Results =====
December 29, 2011	Canada Quebec	3–2	Canada Atlantic	Tecumseh Arena, Tecumseh

Y-P Laplante (SH) – 4:13; F. Gauthier (ES) – 13:27; J. Drouin (ES) – 29:51 / Goals / 31:58 – M. Vanderlaan (ES); 56:27 – K. Hodge (ES)

December 29, 2011	Canada Ontario	5–0	Germany	WCFU Centre, Windsor; Attendance: 3,500

B. Robinson (PP) – 14:23; N. Ritchie (ES) – 22:46; T. Murphy (PP) – 29:37; B. Horvat (ES) – 48:40; A. Bateman (ES) – 50:52 / Goals

December 30, 2011	Sweden	2–7	Canada Ontario	WCFU Centre, Windsor; Attendance: 3,100

L. Bristedt (PP) – 19:14; T. Liljendahl (ES) – 43:34 / Goals / 12:09 – B. Horvat (ES); 26:47 – Max Domi (PP); 30:49 – J. Subban (PP); 42:52 B. Pedersoe (PP); 47:10 – B. Pedersen (ES); 49:13 – D. Nurse (PP); 52:04 – M. Dempsey (ES)

December 30, 2011	Germany	0–3	Canada Quebec	Tecumseh Arena, Tecumseh

Goals / 8:19 – Y-P Laplante (PP); 37:15 – A. De Luca (ES); 51:40 – C. Guévremont (ES)

December 31, 2011	Sweden	7–3	Canada Quebec	Tecumseh Arena, Tecumseh

A. Brodecki (ES) – 5:10; L. Bristedt (SH) – 6:25; V. Öhman (SH) – 7:02; V. Öhman (ES) – 14:59; V. Öhman (ES) – 22:43; A. Brodecki (PP) – 52:00; J. de la Rose (PP) – 47:19 / Goals / 18:14 – Y-P Laplante (PP); 44:21 – J. Grégoire (ES); 46:51 – J. Drouin (SH)

December 31, 2011	Canada Atlantic	4–3	Germany	Vollmer Culture and Rec Centre, La Salle; Attendance: 238

M. Lyle (ES) – 15:02; T. Stavert (ES) – 18:30; N. MacKinnon (PP) – 22:43; O. Cooper (ES) – 53:24 / Goals / 0:36 – J. Moeser (ES); 39:07 – F. Wagner (ES); 41:37 – M. Schmidpeter (ES)

January 1, 2012	Germany	2–5	Sweden	Tecumseh Arena, Tecumseh

F. Tiffels (ES) – 11:34; E. Gollenbeck (PP) – 56:14 / Goals / 2:42 – A. Burakovsky (ES); 4:06 – R. Fyrpihl (ES); 5:46 – L. Bristedt (PP); 19:35 – T. Liljendahl (ES); 57:10 – A. Burakovsky (ES)

January 1, 2012	Canada Ontario	3–0	Canada Atlantic	Vollmer Culture and Rec Centre, La Salle

R. Kujawinski (SH) – 24:29; C. Cassels (ES) – 37:07; S. Harper (ENG) – 59:06 / Goals

January 2, 2012	Canada Atlantic	2–8	Sweden	WCFU Centre, Windsor; Attendance: 1,000

K. Kielly (PP) – 9:41; M. Murphy (SH) – 44:08 / Goals / 5:24 – A. Burakovsky (ES); 35:12 – A. Blomberg(ES); 37:31 – L. Bristedt (PP); 39:37 – W. Westlund (PP); 40:36 – R. Hägg (PP); 41:54 – R. Hägg (ES); 44:30 – A. Burakovsky (PP); 46:49 – A. Brodeki (ES)

January 2, 2012	Canada Quebec	2–6	Canada Ontario	WCFU Centre, Windsor; Attendance: 2,200

A. Ranger (ES) – 7:38; Y-P Laplante (ES) – 40:30 / Goals / 15:26 – H. Garlent (ES); 17:14 – M. Dempsey (ES); 26:45 – C. Bigras (ES); 30:40 – H. Garlent (PP); 34:19 – B. Horvat (ES); 51:18 – S. Harper (ES)

==== Group B ====
Team	Pld	W	OTW	OTL	L	GF	GA	GD	Pts
United States	4	3	0	0	1	18	9	+9	9
Russia	4	3	0	0	1	15	11	+4	9
Canada Pacific	4	3	0	0	1	15	9	+6	9
Czech Republic	4	1	0	0	3	8	14	−6	3
Canada West	4	0	0	0	4	10	23	−13	0

===== Results =====
December 29, 2011	United States	5–1	Czech Republic	Vollmer Culture and Rec Centre, La Salle; Attendance: 835

J. T. Compher (PP) – 2:49; E. Allen (ES) – 11:47; J. T. Compher (ES) – 17:54; S. Santini (ES) – 19:12; E. Allan (ES) – 48:54 / Goals / 57:26 – P. Ceslík (ES)

December 29, 2011	Canada Pacific	5–2	Canada West	Tecumseh Arena, Tecumseh

M. Erkamps (ES) – 17:09; S. Reinhart (ES) – 22:25; S. Reinhart (PP) – 25:30; M. Klimchuk (PP) – 39:32; C. Lazar (EN) – 59:07 / Goals / 5:12 – N. Zajac (ES); 36:51 – R. Laurencelle (PP)

December 30, 2011	United States	2–3	Russia	WCFU Centre, Windsor

E. Allan (ES) – 41:33; H. Fasching (ES) – 49:32 / Goals / 0:43 – S. Tolchinski (ES); 24:19 – I. Fishchenko (ES); 45:42 – G. Dikushin (ES)

December 30, 2011	Czech Republic	0–4	Canada Pacific	Vollmer Culture and Rec Centre, La Salle; Attendance: 817

Goals / 6:41 – S. Reinhart (PP); 21:09 – K. Burroughs (ES); 54:42 – S. Reinhart (ES); 57:35 C. Lazar

December 31, 2011	Russia	3–4	Canada Pacific	Vollmer Culture and Rec Centre, La Salle; Attendance: 549

G. Dikushin (ES) – 15:39; V. Nichushkin (ES) – 48:17; I. Barbashev (ES) – 54:29 / Goals / 8:36 – N. Petan (PP); 24:55 – M. Erkamps (PP); 32:58 – T. Baillie (ES); 39:14 – N. Petan (PP)

December 31, 2011	Canada West	2–5	Czech Republic	Tecumseh Arena, Tecumseh

C. Leverton (ES) – 12:19; J. Martin (ES) – 24:24 / Goals / 11:18 – T. Andrlík (PP); 17:17 – M. Kohout (ES); 31:55 – A. Zbořil (PP); 42:02 – D. Pokorný (ES); 50:58 – A. Zbořil (ES)

January 1, 2012	Czech Republic	2–3	Russia	Vollmer Culture and Rec Centre, La Salle; Attendance: 368

P. Zdráhal (ES) – 5:59; J. Vrána (ES) – 27:50 / Goals / 23:55 – V. Gavrikov (ES); 46:32 – I. Barbashev (PP); 55:31 – I. Fishchenko

January 1, 2012	Canada West	3–7	United States	Tecumseh Arena, Tecumseh

R. Laurencelle (PP) – 10:33; K. Doetzel (ES) – 27:12; C. Millette (ES) – 48:27 / Goals / 2:10 – C. Chatham (PP); 16:33 – J. T. Compher (ES); 27:06 – A. Louis (PP); 27:55 – L. Voltin (ES); 49:19 – H. Fasching (ES); 53:49 – A. Louis (PP); 57:06 – A. Louis (PP)

January 2, 2012	Canada Pacific	2–4	United States	Tecumseh Arena, Tecumseh

T. White (ES) – 12:30; M. Klimchuk (PP) – 59:34 / Goals / 20:52 – E. Allen (PP); 25:03 – E. Allen (ES); 40:52 – H. Fasching (ES); 45:07 – H. Fasching (PP)

January 2, 2012	Russia	6–3	Canada West	Vollmer Culture and Rec Centre, La Salle

I. Barbashev (PP) – 8:24; V. Nichushkin (ES) – 21:59; A. Zakarlyukin (ES) – 38:28; V. Nichushkin (ES) – 46:00; Y. Zakurin (ES) – 52:34; S. Tolchinski (PP) – 57:01 / Goals / 17:44 – D. Bosc (ES); 25:57 – C. Millette (PP); 35:03 – J. Tkatch (ES)

=== Final round ===
Semifinals
A1	Canada Ontario	3
B2	Russia	4*
B1	United States	2**
A2	Sweden	1

Final
SF1	Russia	7
SF2	United States	4

* Decided in overtime. ** Decided in a shootout

==== Semifinals ====
January 3, 2012	Sweden	1–2 SO	United States	WCFU Centre, Windsor; Attendance: 1,300

L. Bristedt (SH) – 37:20 Robert Hägg (miss); Leon Bristedt (miss) / Goals / 43:10 – M. McCarron (ES) Evan Allen; Anthony Louis

January 3, 2012	Russia	4–3 OT	Canada Ontario	WCFU Centre, Windsor; Attendance: 2,400

I. Barbashev (ES) – 3:28; S. Tolchinski (ES) – 35:31; G. Dikushin (ES) – 55:45; G. Dikushin (ES) – 68:27 / Goals / 10:53 – S. Nosad (PP); 25:32 – A. Ekblad (PP); 47:10 – H. Garlent (ES)

==== 9th place game ====
January 3, 2012	Canada West	3–6	Germany	Vollmer Culture and Rec Centre, La Salle

N. Zajac (PP) – 4:51; M. Bowey (PP) – 16:46; J. Martin (ES) – 17:19 / Goals / 21:46 – T. Bender (PP); 23:08 – J. Fischer (ES); 27:12 – L. Draisaitl (PP); 37:48 – M. Sedlar (ES); 50:19 – J. Moeser (PP); 59:41 – F. Tiffels (ENG)

==== 7th place game ====
January 3, 2012	Czech Republic	2–4	Canada Atlantic	Tecumseh Arena, Tecumseh

J. Vrána (PP) – 13:17; M. Kohout (ES) – 23:27 / Goals / 18:07 – A. Gallant (ES); 38:46 – B. Beaton (ES); 37:55 – B. Beaton (PP); 59:36 – O. Cooper (ENG)

==== 5th place game ====
January 3, 2012	Canada Pacific	5–4 OT	Canada Quebec	Vollmer Culture and Rec Centre, La Salle

M. Needham (PP) – 21:43; M. Erkamps (ES) – 28:56; G. Chase (ES) – 31:38; N. Petan (ES) – 35:17; J. Morrissey (PP) – 63:12 / Goals / 2:41 – A. De Luca (ES); 25:35 – Y-P Laplante (ES); 54:20 – A. Ranger (ES); 58:31 – A. De Luca (ES)

==== Bronze medal game ====
January 4, 2012	Sweden	2–5	Canada Ontario	WCFU Centre, Windsor; Attendance: 1,318

L. Bristedt (ES) – 28:43; L. Bristedt (ES) – 34:42 / Goals / 32:28 – B. Horvat (ES); 40:20 – J. Subban (PP); 42:44 – N. Baptiste (SH); 47:39 – M. Domi (PP); 54:21 – M. Domi (ES)

==== Gold medal game ====
January 4, 2012	Russia	7–4	United States	WCFU Centre, Windsor; Attendance: 4,192

S. Tolchinski (SH) – 32:04; V. Nichushkin (ES) – 35:07; N. Cherepanov (ES) – 37:36; I. Barbashev (ES) – 48:26; S. Tolchinski (SH PS) – 43:20; V. Nichushkin (ENG) – 59:43; S. Tolchinski (ENG) – 59:51 / Goals / 8:38 – E. Allen (ES); 35:41 – W. Butcher (PP); 54:45 – J. T. Compher (PP); 57:56 – A. Louis (ES)

== Scoring leaders ==
Player	Country	GP	G	A	Pts	PIM
Victor Öhman	Sweden	6	3	9	12	2
J. T. Compher	United States	6	4	7	11	14
Grigori Dikushin	Russia	6	4	6	10	0
Sam Reinhart	Canada Pacific	5	4	6	10	2
Valeri Nichushkin	Russia	6	5	4	9	0
Leon Bristaedt	Sweden	6	7	1	8	10
Ivan Barbashev	Russia	6	5	3	8	4
André Burakovsky	Sweden	6	4	4	8	4
Anthony Louis	United States	6	4	4	8	2
Hunter Garlent	United States	6	3	5	8	6

== Goaltending leaders ==
(Minimum 60 minutes played)

Player	Country	MINS	GA	Sv%	GAA	SO
Thatcher Demko	United States	110:00	2	.949	1.09	0
Tristan Jarry	Canada Pacific	123:12	4	.943	1.95	1
Jacob Fancy	Canada Atlantic	179:38	7	.935	2.34	0
Spencer Martin	Canada Ontario	308:27	10	.931	1.95	1
Nikita Serebryakov	Russia	308:27	14	.930	2.72	0

== Final standings ==
	Team
1st place, gold medalist(s)	Russia
2nd place, silver medalist(s)	United States
3rd place, bronze medalist(s)	Canada Ontario
4	Sweden
5	Canada Pacific
6	Canada Quebec
7	Canada Atlantic
8	Czech Republic
9	Germany
10	Canada West

== Tournament All-Star Team ==
- Goaltender: (Russia) Nikita Serebryakov
- Defencemen: (United States) Gage Ausmus, (Canada) Ontario Darnell Nurse
- Forwards: (United States) J. T. Compher, (Sweden) Victor Öhman, (Russia) Sergey Tolchinsky

== See also ==
World U-17 Hockey Challenge

- 2012 IIHF World U18 Championships
- 2012 World Junior Ice Hockey Championships
