= Bo Horvat =

Canadian ice hockey player (born 1995)

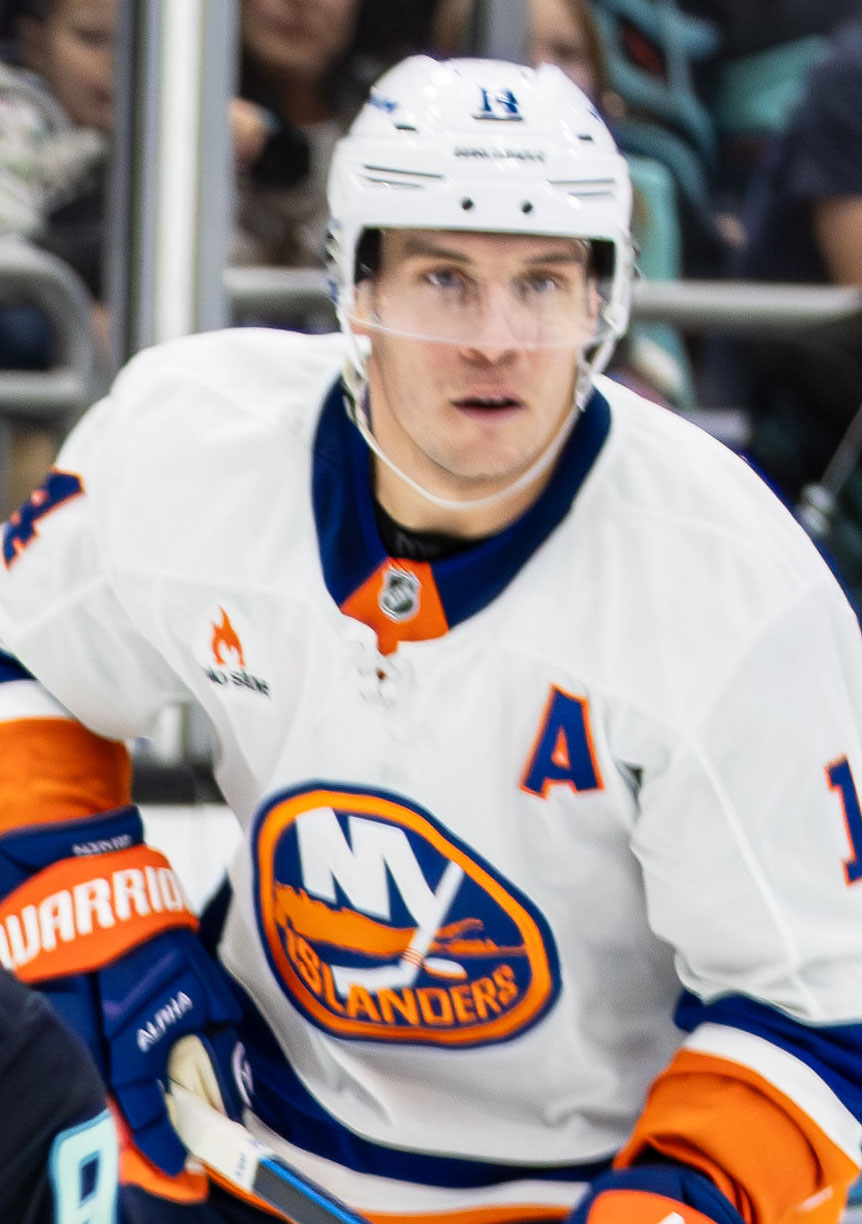
- Horvat with the New York Islanders in November 2024
- Born: April 5, 1995 (age 31) London, Ontario, Canada
- Height: 6 ft 1 in (185 cm)
- Weight: 215 lb (98 kg; 15 st 5 lb)
- Position: Centre
- Shoots: Left
- NHL team Former teams: New York Islanders; Vancouver Canucks
- National team: Canada
- NHL draft: 9th overall, 2013; Vancouver Canucks
- Playing career: 2014–present

Bowie William Horvat (born April 5, 1995) is a Canadian professional ice hockey player who is a centre and captain for the New York Islanders of the National Hockey League (NHL).

He was selected ninth overall by the Vancouver Canucks in the 2013 NHL entry draft, where he served as captain from 2019 until his trade to the Islanders in 2023. During his junior career in the Ontario Hockey League (OHL), he won the Wayne Gretzky 99 Award as playoff MVP in 2013, as well as two J. Ross Robertson Cup titles with the London Knights. Internationally, he has played for Canada at the 2012 World U-17 Hockey Challenge, 2012 Ivan Hlinka Memorial Tournament (under-18), 2014 World Junior Championships, 2018 World Championship and the 2026 Winter Olympics.

== Early life ==
Horvat was born on April 5, 1995, in London, Ontario, to Tim and Cindy Horvat. He grew up in Rodney, Ontario, a 90-minute drive from Detroit, Michigan, and attended a number of Detroit Red Wings ice hockey games as a child. Bo and his younger brother Cal would often practise playing hockey in the family basement throughout their childhoods, until Horvat moved away at the age of 12 to live with a billet family and play with the Toronto Red Wings minor ice hockey team. In 2008, Horvat helped the Red Wings defeat the London Jr. Knights in the All-Toronto Peewee AAA hockey tournament, scoring 10 goals and leading the team with 16 points in the round-robin part of the tournament.

During the 2010–11 minor hockey season, Horvat played minor hockey for the Elgin-Middlesex Chiefs of the Alliance Hockey organization, where he was named the league player of the year after recording 47 goals and 71 assists for 118 points in 68 games. His Chiefs coach Rob Simpson described Horvat as a player who "put up a ton of points and maybe cheated [defensively] a little bit at times". When the Elgin-Middlesex season came to an end, Horvat also played in five games with the St. Thomas Stars of the Greater Ontario Junior Hockey League, which was coached by his father, and helped them win their respective league championship. He used that cup of coffee stint with the Stars as a way of preparing for the impending jump from minor to junior ice hockey.

== Playing career ==
=== Junior ===
Following his year with Elgin-Middlesex and St. Thomas, the London Knights of the Ontario Hockey League (OHL) selected Horvat ninth overall in the 2011 OHL Priority Selection draft. Joining the Knights for the 2011–12 season, Horvat scored his first OHL goal in his league debut, an 8–0 win over the Saginaw Spirit on September 23, 2011. During his rookie year with London, Horvat scored 11 goals and recorded an additional 19 assists, and he posted a +27 plus–minus through 64 regular season games. That year, the Knights won the J. Ross Robertson Cup as OHL champions, defeating the Niagara IceDogs in a best-of-seven series, and they advanced to the 2012 Memorial Cup finals, where they were defeated in overtime by Canadian Hockey League (CHL) champions the Shawinigan Cataractes.

During the 2012–13 season, Horvat improved to 33 goals and 61 points in 67 regular season games. This included a 17-game point streak in the middle of the season, which ended when the Sault Ste. Marie Greyhounds defeated the Knights 4–2 on January 13, 2013. He also received coaches' awards for the OHL Western Conference as the best face-off skater and shot blocker on the team. On the Knights' way to their second consecutive OHL championship, Horvat led the league with 16 goals and 23 points in 21 postseason games, the last of which was the game-winning goal with 0.1 seconds left to play in Game 7 of the OHL finals. The Knights defeated the Barrie Colts 3–2, and Horvat received the Wayne Gretzky 99 Award for the most valuable player in the OHL playoffs. Although the Knights lost to the Portland Winterhawks during the semifinal round of the 2013 Memorial Cup, Horvat, who had five points in as many games and did not record any penalty minutes, was awarded the George Parsons Trophy for the most sportsmanlike player during the tournament.

Leading into his professional draft year, the NHL Central Scouting Bureau ranked Horvat the 15th-most valuable hockey prospect in North America. On June 30, 2013, the Vancouver Canucks of the National Hockey League (NHL) traded goaltender Cory Schneider to the New Jersey Devils in exchange for the ninth overall pick in the 2013 NHL entry draft, which they used to draft Horvat. On August 6, Horvat signed a three-year, entry-level contract with Vancouver. Although it appeared at first that Horvat would join the Canucks for the 2013–14 NHL season, coach John Tortorella wanted him to develop more in the OHL, where he would receive more playing time than the eight or nine minutes per game that an 18-year-old in the NHL would. The acquisition of Zac Dalpe and Jeremy Welsh from the Carolina Hurricanes gave the Canucks enough roster depth that they could send Horvat and fellow draft pick Hunter Shinkaruk back to their respective junior teams.

Upon his return to London for the 2013–14 OHL season, Horvat was speculated to be the Knights' next captain, as both Jarred Tinordi and Scott Harrington had turned professional, but the Knights decided to postpone selecting a captain until after Christmas. The title ultimately went to Chris Tierney, while Horvat was named one of four alternate captains. As alternate captain, Horvat put together his second consecutive 30-goal campaign, with a career-best 44 assists and 74 points in the regular season. The Knights, meanwhile, fell short of becoming three-time OHL champions when they were defeated by the Guelph Storm in the semifinals.

=== Vancouver Canucks (2014–2023) ===
Competing for an NHL roster spot in his second training camp with the Canucks the following season, Horvat was hit by Edmonton Oilers forward Tyler Pitlick during a pre-season game and suffered a shoulder injury. Upon recovering, he was assigned to the Canucks' American Hockey League (AHL) affiliate, the Utica Comets, on a conditioning basis. After five games without a point with Utica, Horvat returned to the Canucks.

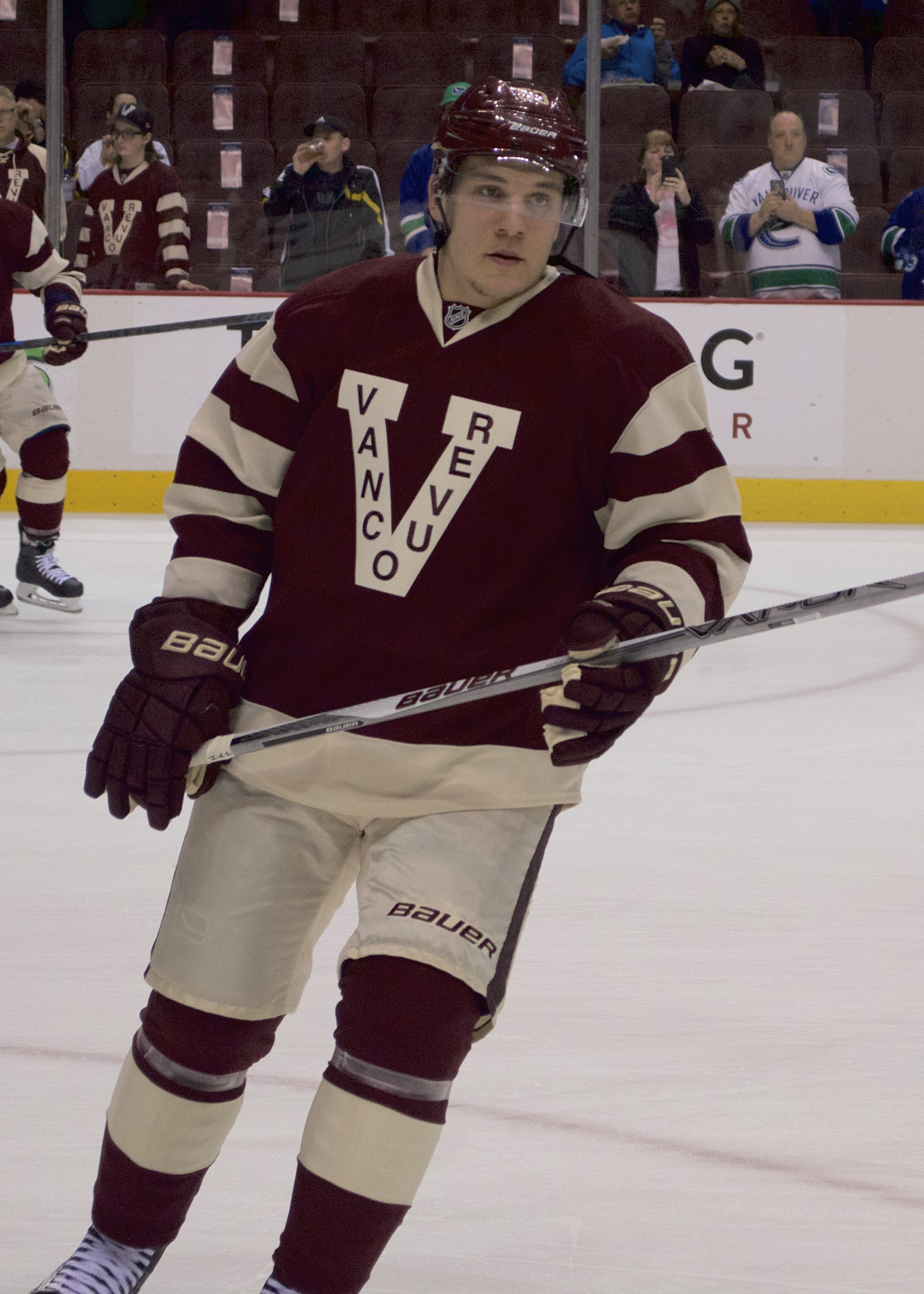
Horvat in March 2015, wearing the Canucks' replica Vancouver Millionaires jersey

Horvat made his NHL debut on November 4, 2014, against the Colorado Avalanche. Six games later, he scored his first NHL goal on November 20 against Frederik Andersen of the Anaheim Ducks. The following game, he registered his first three assists in a 4–1 win against the Chicago Blackhawks. On November 25, the Canucks announced that they would not be returning Horvat to the OHL despite his remaining year of junior eligibility. Despite Horvat's status as a highly anticipated prospect, Canucks head coach Willie Desjardins admitted later in the season he had not expected Horvat to compete for a roster spot. Starting the season on the third line with wingers Jannik Hansen and fellow rookie Ronalds Ķēniņš, Horvat earned bottom-six ice time for the first half of his first year with Vancouver before getting bumped up to the second line with Chris Higgins and Alexandre Burrows, averaging 12:15 minutes per game. In 68 games, Horvat scored 13 goals and 12 assists for 25 points. His season play earned him two fifth-place votes for the Calder Memorial Trophy, ranking him 11th among first-year players for the rookie of the year award. During the 2015 playoffs, he added a team-high four points in six games during the Canucks' first-round loss in six games to the Calgary Flames.

During the first half of the 2015–16 season, Horvat juggled heightened goal-scoring expectations along with increased defensive responsibility after injuries to Brandon Sutter and Henrik Sedin. After enduring two goal-scoring droughts of nine and 27 games, respectively, he went on a six-game point streak between January 4 and 15, during which he scored six goals and nine points. When that streak ended on January 17, it was tied for the longest active point streak in the NHL. Horvat credited this change to advice from his father to shoot the puck more often, in lieu of bull-rushing the net, in addition to increased chemistry with left-winger Sven Bärtschi. Horvat ended his sophomore season with 16 goals and 24 assists and 40 points in all 82 games.

On January 10, 2017, Horvat was named an All-Star for the 2017 NHL All-Star Game after having tallied 13 goals and 16 assists up to that point. Horvat was the youngest Canuck to be selected for an All-Star Game since Trevor Linden. On March 3, 2017, Horvat was named as one of Vancouver's second alternate captains, replacing longtime Canuck Alexandre Burrows. Horvat ended the 2016–17 season playing in all in all 82 games with 20 goals, 32 assists and 52 points recorded, setting career highs in all three categories.

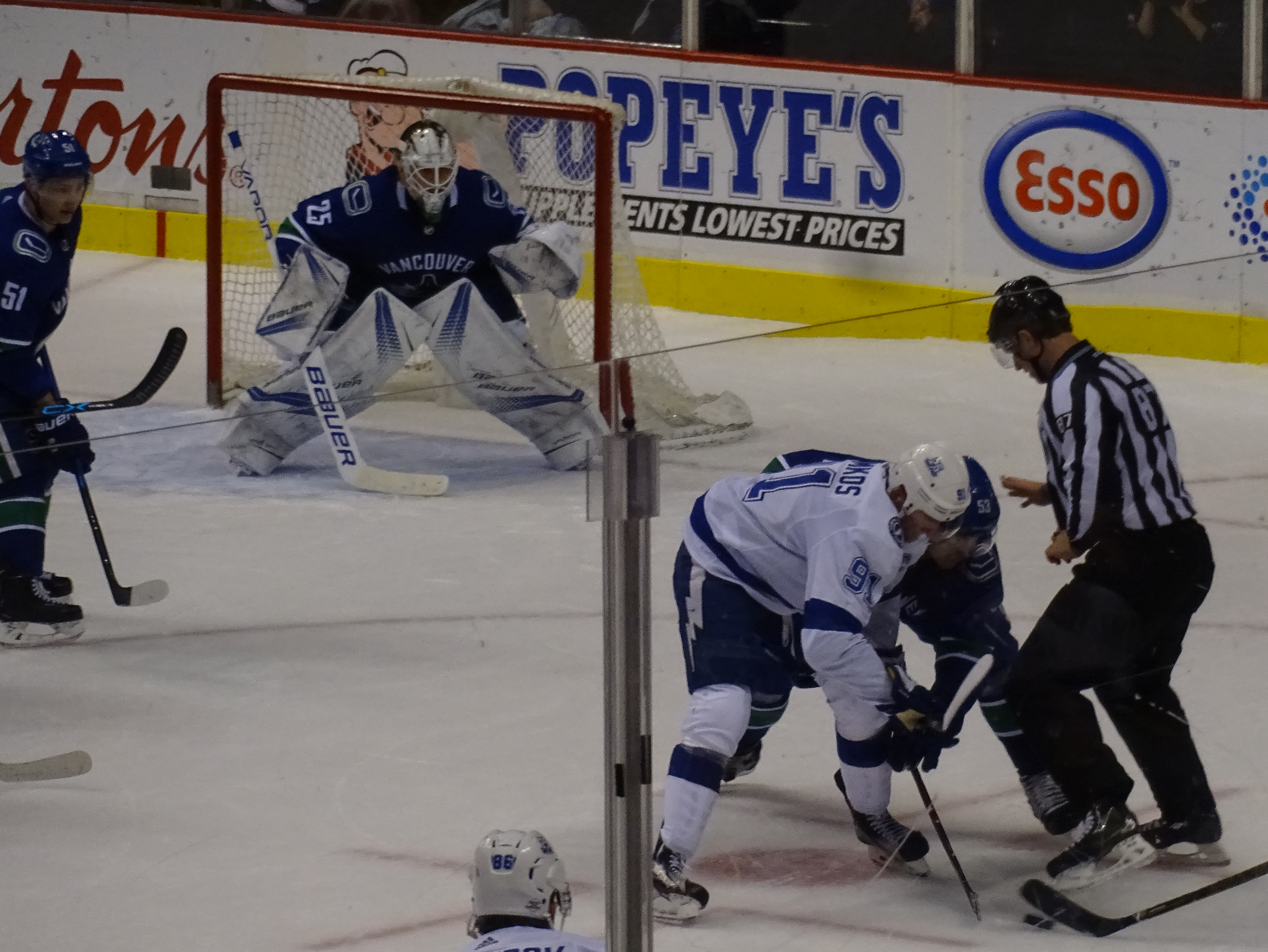
Horvat with the Canucks taking a faceoff against Steven Stamkos in February 2018

On September 8, 2017, following the expiry of his entry-level contract after the previous season, the Canucks re-signed Horvat to a six-year, $33 million contract extension worth $5.5 million annually. On December 5, 2017, Horvat suffered a broken foot during a game against the Carolina Hurricanes which resulted in him missing six weeks of play. Despite missing 18 games over that span, Horvat managed to set a new career-high in goals with 22, along with 22 assists for 44 points in 64 games and often playing on the second line with Bärtschi and rookie Brock Boeser.

The following season, after the retirement of Daniel and Henrik Sedin, Horvat was named one of four alternative captains for the Canucks, after not having served the role during the 2017–18 season. During the 2018–19 season, injuries on the Canucks as well as a lack of team depth forced Horvat to play most of the season without consistent linemates. However, Horvat still managed to set career highs in goals (27), assists (34), and points (61) in all 82 games.

On October 9, 2019, Horvat was named the 14th captain of the franchise in a pre-game ceremony during the home opener of the Canucks' 50th season. On October 20, during a game against the New York Rangers, Horvat scored his 100th career goal, helping the Canucks win 3–2. Two days later in Vancouver's next game, Horvat notched his first career hat trick, leading the Canucks to a 5–2 win over the Detroit Red Wings after the team trailed in the game 2–0. After a months-long league-wide season suspension due to the COVID-19 pandemic, Horvat joined the Canucks in their return to play on August 1, 2020, as the team qualified for the 2020 playoffs, marking the first time since 2015 when Horvat was a rookie, where the Canucks qualified for the playoffs. The first-year captain would notch 10 goals and two assists for 12 points in 17 games, as the Canucks would win in the first round in six games against the St. Louis Blues before a seven-game series elimination in Round 2 by the Vegas Golden Knights. Horvat's 10 goals would be good enough for the third highest goal-scoring output in a playoff year by a Canuck, trailing only Pavel Bure and Trevor Linden's respective 16 and 12 goal efforts in the 1994 Stanley Cup playoff run, where the Canucks reached the Stanley Cup Final and lost in seven games to the New York Rangers, one win short of winning the Stanley Cup.

=== New York Islanders (2023–present) ===
On January 30, 2023, Horvat's nine-season tenure with the Canucks came to an end when he was traded to the New York Islanders, in exchange for Anthony Beauvillier, Aatu Räty and a conditional first-round pick in 2023. He was in the midst of a career-best goal-scoring season; he had already matched his career high of 31 goals set in the previous season through only 49 games at the time he was traded. Prior to the trade, he was named to his second All-Star Game as a member of the Canucks. Despite playing for an Eastern Conference team by then, he still represented the Pacific Division. He switched from jersey number 53 to 14 upon his arrival in New York, as 53 was already being worn by Casey Cizikas. On February 5, Horvat signed an eight-year, $68 million contract extension with the Islanders. On February 7, he scored his first goal with the Islanders in a 4–0 win over the Seattle Kraken.

On September 14, 2026, Horvat was named the 16th captain in franchise history, succeeding Anders Lee.

== International play ==
Medal record

Men's ice hockey

Representing Canada

Olympic Games
| Silver medal – second place | 2026 Milano Cortina | |

Ivan Hlinka Memorial Tournament
| Gold medal – first place | 2012 Slovakia | |

World U-17 Hockey Challenge
| Gold medal – first place | 2012 Canada | |

Horvat was a member of Team Ontario's under-16 team at the 2011 Canada Winter Games. Scoring a team-leading nine points (four goals and five assists) in six games, he helped Ontario to a fourth-place finish. The following year, he captained Team Ontario at the 2012 World U-17 Hockey Challenge to a bronze medal. He scored four goals and seven points in six games, including a goal and an assist in the bronze medal game against Sweden. The same year, he was named an alternate captain for Canada under-18 team at the 2012 Ivan Hlinka Memorial Tournament. With two goals and four points in five games, he helped Canada to a gold medal.

During his third OHL season, Horvat was named to Canada junior team for the 2014 World Junior Championships. After beginning the tournament in an offensive role, centring a line with Connor McDavid and Sam Reinhart, he finished on Canada's checking line and earned praise from head coach Brent Sutter for his defensive play. In seven games, he recorded a goal and three points as Canada ranked fourth.

In 2015, the Canucks had the option of loaning Horvat to the national team for the World Junior Championships, but instead chose to retain him in the NHL.

On April 12, 2018, Horvat was named to Canada senior team to compete at the 2018 World Championship. Horvat was also named in 2025 to the national team to compete at the 2025 World Championship.

On December 31, 2025, he was named to Canada's roster to compete at the 2026 Winter Olympics.

== Personal life ==
Horvat is second cousins with fellow NHL player Travis Konecny of the Philadelphia Flyers. Because Horvat is slightly older than Konecny, the two did not play minor hockey together, but would regularly face each other throughout their junior and professional careers. Horvat's younger brother Cal also played for the Elgin-Middlesex Chiefs and London Knights before deciding to become a police officer in Ontario. Horvat chose jersey number 53 in tribute to fellow London Knights draftee, goalie Ian Jenkins, who wore number 35 and died in an automobile accident in May 2011, shortly before he and Horvat were required to report to London's regular season training camp.

Horvat proposed to his longtime girlfriend, professional equestrian and curler Holly Donaldson, on September 3, 2018. They met during Horvat's junior hockey career, when Donaldson was attending the University of Western Ontario. The couple wed in July 2019, with Horvat's Canucks teammate Sven Bärtschi and his former OHL teammates Max Domi, Josh Anderson, and Chris Tierney all serving as groomsmen. The couple's first child was born on June 28, 2020, shortly before Horvat was required to report to Vancouver's playoff training camp.

== Career statistics ==
=== Regular season and playoffs ===
| | | | Regular season | | | | | Playoffs |
| Season | Team | League | GP | G | A | Pts | PIM | GP | G | A | Pts | PIM |
|---|---|---|---|---|---|---|---|---|---|---|---|---|
| 2011–12 | London Knights | OHL | 64 | 11 | 19 | 30 | 8 | 18 | 1 | 3 | 4 | 0 |
| 2012–13 | London Knights | OHL | 67 | 33 | 28 | 61 | 29 | 21 | 16 | 7 | 23 | 10 |
| 2013–14 | London Knights | OHL | 54 | 30 | 44 | 74 | 36 | 9 | 5 | 6 | 11 | 4 |
| 2014–15 | Utica Comets | AHL | 5 | 0 | 0 | 0 | 4 | — | — | — | — | — |
| 2014–15 | Vancouver Canucks | NHL | 68 | 13 | 12 | 25 | 16 | 6 | 1 | 3 | 4 | 2 |
| 2015–16 | Vancouver Canucks | NHL | 82 | 16 | 24 | 40 | 18 | — | — | — | — | — |
| 2016–17 | Vancouver Canucks | NHL | 81 | 20 | 32 | 52 | 27 | — | — | — | — | — |
| 2017–18 | Vancouver Canucks | NHL | 64 | 22 | 22 | 44 | 10 | — | — | — | — | — |
| 2018–19 | Vancouver Canucks | NHL | 82 | 27 | 34 | 61 | 33 | — | — | — | — | — |
| 2019–20 | Vancouver Canucks | NHL | 69 | 22 | 31 | 53 | 21 | 17 | 10 | 2 | 12 | 4 |
| 2020–21 | Vancouver Canucks | NHL | 56 | 19 | 20 | 39 | 23 | — | — | — | — | — |
| 2021–22 | Vancouver Canucks | NHL | 70 | 31 | 21 | 52 | 40 | — | — | — | — | — |
| 2022–23 | Vancouver Canucks | NHL | 49 | 31 | 23 | 54 | 12 | — | — | — | — | — |
| 2022–23 | New York Islanders | NHL | 30 | 7 | 9 | 16 | 6 | 6 | 1 | 1 | 2 | 0 |
| 2023–24 | New York Islanders | NHL | 81 | 33 | 35 | 68 | 39 | 5 | 1 | 2 | 3 | 0 |
| 2024–25 | New York Islanders | NHL | 81 | 28 | 29 | 57 | 16 | — | — | — | — | — |
| 2025–26 | New York Islanders | NHL | 68 | 31 | 26 | 57 | 40 | — | — | — | — | — |
| NHL totals | | | 881 | 300 | 318 | 618 | 301 | 34 | 13 | 8 | 21 | 6 |

=== International play ===
| Year | Team | Event | GP | G | A | Pts | PIM |
|---|---|---|---|---|---|---|---|
| 2011 | Ontario | CWG | 6 | 4 | 5 | 9 | 6 |
| 2012 | Ontario | U17 | 6 | 4 | 3 | 7 | 6 |
| 2012 | Canada | IH18 | 5 | 2 | 2 | 4 | 6 |
| 2014 | Canada | WJC | 7 | 1 | 2 | 3 | 6 |
| 2018 | Canada | WC | 10 | 3 | 4 | 7 | 0 |
| 2025 | Canada | WC | 6 | 4 | 4 | 8 | 2 |
| 2026 | Canada | OG | 6 | 2 | 0 | 2 | 2 |
| Junior totals | | | 18 | 7 | 7 | 14 | 18 |
| Senior totals | | | 22 | 9 | 8 | 17 | 4 |

== Awards and honours ==
| Award | Year | Ref |
OHL
| J. Ross Robertson Cup champion | 2012, 2013 | |
| Wayne Gretzky 99 Award | 2013 | |
CHL
| George Parsons Trophy | 2013 | |
NHL
| NHL All-Star Game | 2017, 2023 | |
Vancouver Canucks
| Pavel Bure Most Exciting Player Award | 2016, 2017 | |
| Cyrus H. McLean Trophy | 2017 | |
| Cyclone Taylor Trophy | 2017, 2021 | |

Awards and achievements
| Preceded by Brendan Gaunce | Vancouver Canucks first-round draft pick 2013 | Succeeded by Hunter Shinkaruk |
Sporting positions
| Preceded by Henrik Sedin | Vancouver Canucks captain 2019–2023 | Succeeded by Quinn Hughes |
| Preceded by Anders Lee | New York Islanders captain 2026–present | Incumbent |
