= Tie Domi =

Canadian-Albanian ice hockey player

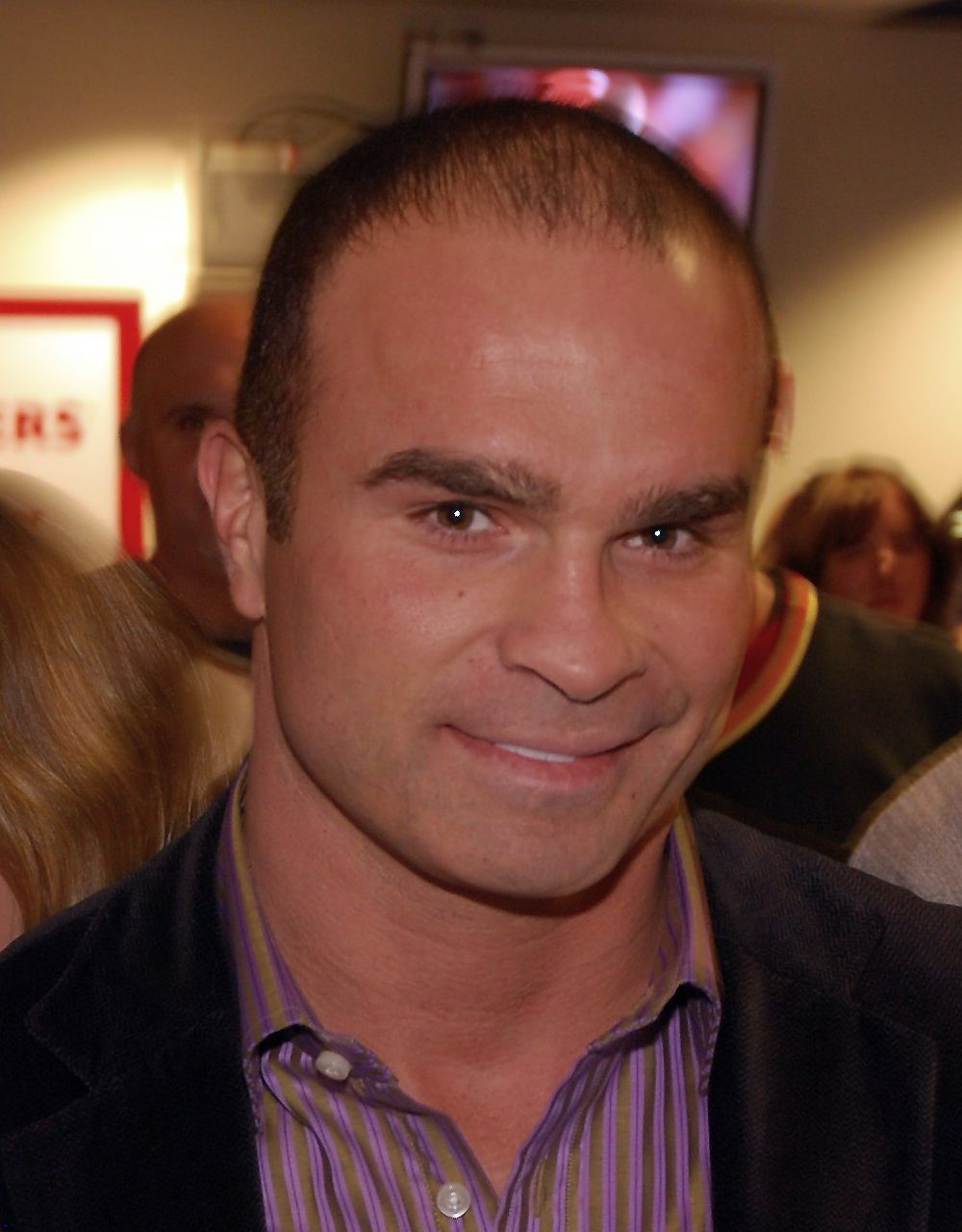
- Domi in 2016
- Born: November 1, 1969 (age 56) Windsor, Ontario, Canada
- Height: 5 ft 8 in (173 cm)
- Weight: 213 lb (97 kg; 15 st 3 lb)
- Position: Right wing
- Shot: Right
- Played for: Toronto Maple Leafs; New York Rangers; Winnipeg Jets
- NHL draft: 27th overall, 1988; Toronto Maple Leafs
- Playing career: 1989–2006
- Website: www.tiedomi.com

Tahir "Tie" Domi (born November 1, 1969) is a Canadian former professional ice hockey player. Known as an enforcer, he played for the Toronto Maple Leafs, New York Rangers, and Winnipeg Jets over a 16-year National Hockey League (NHL) career. He is the Maple Leafs' all-time leader in penalty minutes, and he is third overall in penalty minutes in NHL history. He is also the player with the most fighting majors in NHL history, with 333.

== Playing career ==
=== Minor and junior ===
Domi was born in Windsor, Ontario, to Albanian parents, and grew up in nearby Belle River (now part of Lakeshore). As a child, he played minor hockey for the local Belle River Rink Rats of the Ontario Minor Hockey Association. When he was 15, Domi played for the Belle River Canadiens of the Great Lakes Junior C Hockey League, later moving up a level the following year to play with the Windsor Bulldogs of the Western Junior B Hockey League.

At the 1986 Ontario Hockey League (OHL) Priority Selection, he was drafted in the seventh round (102nd overall) by the Peterborough Petes. Domi began his major junior career in 1986–87, spending his first year as a part-time player with the Petes, while also appearing with the nearby Peterborough Roadrunners in the Metro Junior A Hockey League. In his first full season with the Petes in 1987–88, he recorded an OHL career-high 22 goals and 43 points over 60 games, to go along with 292 penalty minutes, earning a reputation as an enforcer.

During the off-season, he was selected in the second round (27th overall) by the Toronto Maple Leafs in the 1988 NHL entry draft. Upon his selection, Domi returned to the Petes for one more season of junior, recording 14 goals and 30 points over 43 games.

=== Early professional career ===
Domi turned professional in 1989–90 with Toronto's American Hockey League (AHL) affiliate, the Newmarket Saints, recording 14 goals and 25 points over 57 games, along with 285 penalty minutes. He also made his NHL debut that season, appearing in two games with the Leafs in which he accumulated 42 penalty minutes. In the off-season, he was traded to the New York Rangers. He split the subsequent year between New York and their AHL affiliate, the Binghamton Rangers. During his 28 games with New York in 1990–91, he scored his first NHL goal on March 23, 1991, against the Philadelphia Flyers. After playing a full NHL campaign with the Rangers in 1991–92, Domi was traded early the following season to the Winnipeg Jets.

=== Toronto Maple Leafs ===
In 1995, Domi was traded back to the Toronto Maple Leafs. That year, he famously knocked New York Rangers defenceman Ulf Samuelsson unconscious with a sucker punch to the face. Domi was suspended 8 games and heavily fined for the incident, described by some as one of the cheapest shots in NHL history. Domi insisted that Samuelsson provoked the punch by repeatedly calling him "dummy". In the 1997–98 season, Domi set a Leafs single-season record with 365 penalty minutes, passing a mark set by Tiger Williams in 1977–78.

During the 2000–01 season, Domi was involved in an incident with a fan during an away game on March 29, 2001, against the Philadelphia Flyers. Sitting in the penalty box, Domi used his water bottle to spray water at a heckler, prompting another Flyers fan, Christopher Falcone, to begin yelling at him and climbing up the glass. The glass panel gave way, and Falcone fell into the penalty box and Domi then grabbed Falcone and punched him several times. After the game in an interview, Domi said to the media, "It's nice to see the fans get involved, I guess." Domi was fined $1000, the maximum allowable at the time by the NHLPA's collective bargaining agreement, but received no suspension.

On May 3, 2001, in the closing seconds of Game 4 of the 2001 Eastern Conference Semi-finals, well away from the play, Domi threw an elbow at the head of New Jersey Devils defenceman Scott Niedermayer, knocking him unconscious. Domi was assessed a game misconduct and the following day, was suspended by the league for the remainder of the playoffs, with the condition that if Toronto did not advance to the following round, then Domi was to sit out the first 8 games of the 2001-02 NHL season. Toronto was eliminated by New Jersey in Game 7, and Domi's suspension subsequently carried over into the following season.

On June 30, 2002, ahead of his unrestricted free agency, Domi's rights were traded to the Nashville Predators by Toronto for Nashville's 8th round choice (Shaun Landolt) in the 2003 NHL entry draft. Nashville was unable to sign him, with Domi later re-signing with Toronto as a free agent on July 13, 2002. He had his best season in the 2002-03 NHL season, when he set career highs of 15 goals and 29 points.

In what turned out to be his final season of 2005–06, Domi scored his 100th NHL goal. Also, Domi played his 1,000th career NHL game, on March 3, 2006, against the Buffalo Sabres. Seven days later, on March 10, 2006, Domi was a healthy scratch for the Maple Leafs' game versus the New York Islanders, which was the first time since the 1999 playoffs that he had been made a healthy scratch by coach Pat Quinn. Domi stated publicly that he was not happy with being benched, a fact that was underlined by his staying in his hotel room, not arriving at the game until after the second period and was widely regarded as a contributing factor in the decision to buy out his contract.

On June 30, 2006, the Maple Leafs opted to buy out the final year of Domi's contract. He became a free agent on July 1, 2006. Without a contract several months later, Domi announced his retirement on September 19.

Domi is the all-time NHL leader in fights with 333.

== Off the ice ==
=== Media and entertainment ===
During his NHL career, Domi also appeared in three films, playing a role in the 1999 independent film Men of Means, while also making a cameo appearance in the hockey-themed drama Mystery, Alaska. In 2007 Domi played himself in a season 2 episode of Canadian sitcom Rent-a-Goalie titled "Domi Daze".

Following his retirement, Domi accepted a position in broadcasting with The Sports Network (TSN), a stint that lasted less than a month.

In October 2009, Domi began competing as a pairs figure skater on the Canadian Broadcasting Corporation reality show Battle of the Blades with Christine Hough.

Domi is currently a spokesperson for Comwave, a telecommunications company.

=== Soccer and Canadian football ===
Domi has also been involved in soccer and Canadian football at the professional and semi-professional levels. He was scouted by the University of Michigan for both sports while in high school. He played a full season for Kosovo of the Canadian International Soccer League during the summer of 1995, and appeared in two pre-season exhibition games as a placekicker for the Toronto Argonauts of the Canadian Football League.

=== Family ===
Domi has three children from his marriage to his ex-wife, Leanne: daughters Carlin and Avery Rose, and son Max, who is a current NHL player. Domi's 13-year marriage ended in divorce in 2006. In 2017, he married Heather McDonough, and the couple live in New York City.

=== Controversy ===
During the 2012 Ivan Hlinka Memorial Tournament, an international under-18 competition Max was participating in, Domi stole a video camera belonging to a Swedish coach who had left it running to record the Canadian team's practice. (It is legal and within the rules of the tournament to record another team's practice.) Domi later returned the camera, without its battery.

== Career statistics ==
Bold indicates led league

| | | | Regular season | | | | | Playoffs |
| Season | Team | League | GP | G | A | Pts | PIM | GP | G | A | Pts | PIM |
|---|---|---|---|---|---|---|---|---|---|---|---|---|
| 1984–85 | Belle River Canadiens | GLJHL | 28 | 7 | 5 | 12 | 98 | — | — | — | — | — |
| 1985–86 | Windsor Royals | WOHL | 42 | 8 | 17 | 25 | 346 | — | — | — | — |
| 1986–87 | Peterborough Roadrunners | MetJHL | 2 | 0 | 0 | 0 | 10 | — | — | — | — | — |
| 1986–87 | Peterborough Petes | OHL | 18 | 1 | 1 | 2 | 79 | 10 | 0 | 0 | 0 | 20 |
| 1987–88 | Peterborough Petes | OHL | 60 | 22 | 21 | 43 | 292 | 12 | 3 | 9 | 12 | 24 |
| 1988–89 | Peterborough Petes | OHL | 43 | 14 | 16 | 30 | 175 | 17 | 10 | 9 | 19 | 70 |
| 1988–89 | Peterborough Petes | MC | — | — | — | — | 5 | 2 | 0 | 2 | 2 | 26 |
| 1989–90 | Newmarket Saints | AHL | 57 | 14 | 11 | 25 | 285 | — | — | — | — | — |
| 1989–90 | Toronto Maple Leafs | NHL | 2 | 0 | 0 | 0 | 42 | — | — | — |
| 1990–91 | Binghamton Rangers | AHL | 25 | 11 | 6 | 17 | 219 | 7 | 3 | 2 | 5 | 16 |
| 1990–91 | New York Rangers | NHL | 28 | 1 | 0 | 1 | 185 | — | — | — | — | — |
| 1991–92 | New York Rangers | NHL | 42 | 2 | 4 | 6 | 246 | 6 | 1 | 1 | 2 | 32 |
| 1992–93 | New York Rangers | NHL | 12 | 2 | 0 | 2 | 95 | — | — | — | — | — |
| 1992–93 | Winnipeg Jets | NHL | 49 | 3 | 10 | 13 | 249 | 6 | 1 | 0 | 1 | 23 |
| 1993–94 | Winnipeg Jets | NHL | 81 | 8 | 11 | 19 | **347** | — | — | — | — | — |
| 1994–95 | Winnipeg Jets | NHL | 31 | 4 | 4 | 8 | 128 | — | — | — | — | — |
| 1994–95 | Toronto Maple Leafs | NHL | 9 | 0 | 1 | 1 | 31 | 7 | 1 | 0 | 1 | 0 |
| 1995–96 | Toronto Maple Leafs | NHL | 72 | 7 | 6 | 13 | 297 | 6 | 0 | 2 | 2 | 4 |
| 1996–97 | Toronto Maple Leafs | NHL | 80 | 11 | 17 | 28 | 275 | — | — | — | — | — |
| 1997–98 | Toronto Maple Leafs | NHL | 80 | 4 | 10 | 14 | 365 | — | — | — | — | — |
| 1998–99 | Toronto Maple Leafs | NHL | 72 | 8 | 14 | 22 | 198 | 14 | 0 | 2 | 2 | 24 |
| 1999–2000 | Toronto Maple Leafs | NHL | 70 | 5 | 9 | 14 | 198 | 12 | 0 | 1 | 1 | 20 |
| 2000–01 | Toronto Maple Leafs | NHL | 82 | 13 | 7 | 20 | 214 | 8 | 0 | 1 | 1 | 20 |
| 2001–02 | Toronto Maple Leafs | NHL | 74 | 9 | 10 | 19 | 157 | 19 | 1 | 3 | 4 | 61 |
| 2002–03 | Toronto Maple Leafs | NHL | 79 | 15 | 14 | 29 | 171 | 7 | 1 | 0 | 1 | 13 |
| 2003–04 | Toronto Maple Leafs | NHL | 80 | 7 | 13 | 20 | 208 | 13 | 2 | 2 | 4 | 41 |
| 2005–06 | Toronto Maple Leafs | NHL | 77 | 5 | 11 | 16 | 109 | — | — | — | — | — |
| NHL totals | | | 1,020 | 104 | 141 | 245 | 3,515 | 98 | 7 | 12 | 19 | 238 |

== See also ==
- List of NHL players with 1,000 games played
- List of NHL players with 2,000 career penalty minutes
