= Darnell Nurse =

Canadian ice hockey player (born 1995)

- Nurse with the San Jose Sharks in 2026
- Born: February 4, 1995 (age 31) Hamilton, Ontario, Canada
- Height: 6 ft 4 in (193 cm)
- Weight: 215 lb (98 kg; 15 st 5 lb)
- Position: Defence
- Shoots: Left
- NHL team Former teams: San Jose Sharks; Edmonton Oilers
- National team: Canada
- NHL draft: 7th overall, 2013; Edmonton Oilers
- Playing career: 2014–present

Darnell Nurse (born February 4, 1995) is a Canadian professional ice hockey player who is a defenceman and alternate captain for the San Jose Sharks of the National Hockey League (NHL). Nurse was selected by the Edmonton Oilers seventh overall in the 2013 NHL entry draft, with which he played his first 12 years of his career before his trade to the Sharks in 2026.

== Early life ==
Nurse was born on February 4, 1995, in Hamilton, Ontario. Both of his parents were athletes in their youth: his father Richard Nurse played as a wide receiver for the Hamilton Tiger-Cats of the Canadian Football League, while his mother Cathy was a university basketball player for the McMaster Marauders. As a child, Nurse played football, basketball, lacrosse, and hockey, but by high school, he was only playing the last. His father was worried that Nurse would suffer an injury playing football, while he was, in his own words, "just no good" at basketball.

Standing at nearly 6 feet 4 inches (1.93 m) and weighing 176 pounds (80 kg) by the age of 15, Nurse established himself quickly as a strong, physically assertive defenceman for the Don Mills Flyers minor ice hockey team.

== Playing career ==
=== Major junior ===
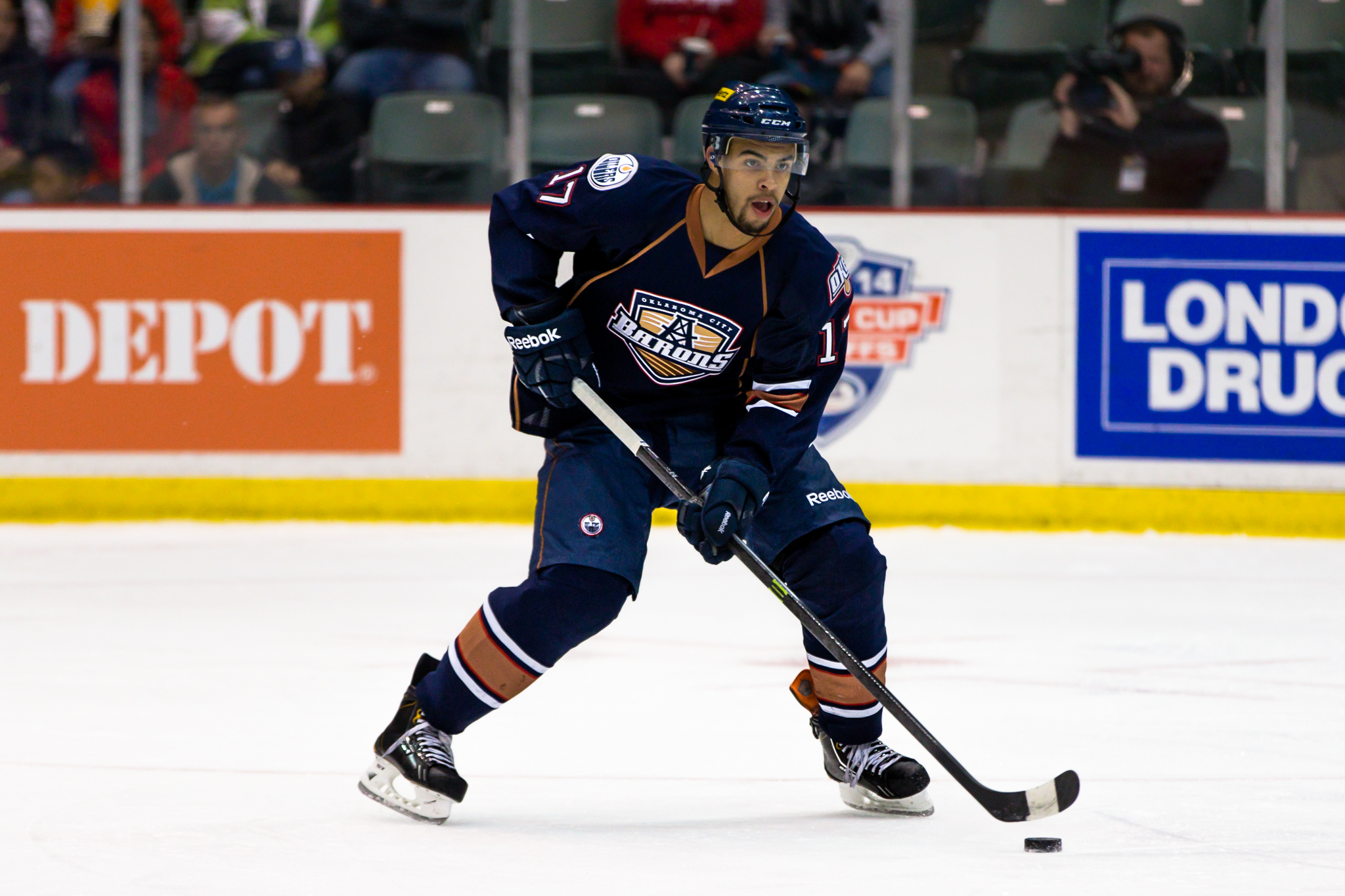
Nurse with the Oklahoma City Barons in 2014

Nurse was selected third overall by the Sault Ste. Marie Greyhounds in the 2011 Ontario Hockey League (OHL) Priority Selection. After two seasons with the Greyhounds, he was selected seventh overall by the Edmonton Oilers in the 2013 NHL entry draft. On July 25, the Oilers signed Nurse to a three-year, entry-level contract. He was returned to the Greyhounds for the 2013–14 season. Prior to the season beginning, he was named team captain. He scored a career-high 50 points in 64 games. After the Greyhounds' season ended, Nurse joined the Oilers' American Hockey League (AHL) affiliate, the Oklahoma City Barons. He skated in four regular season games as well as three playoff games.

=== Edmonton Oilers ===
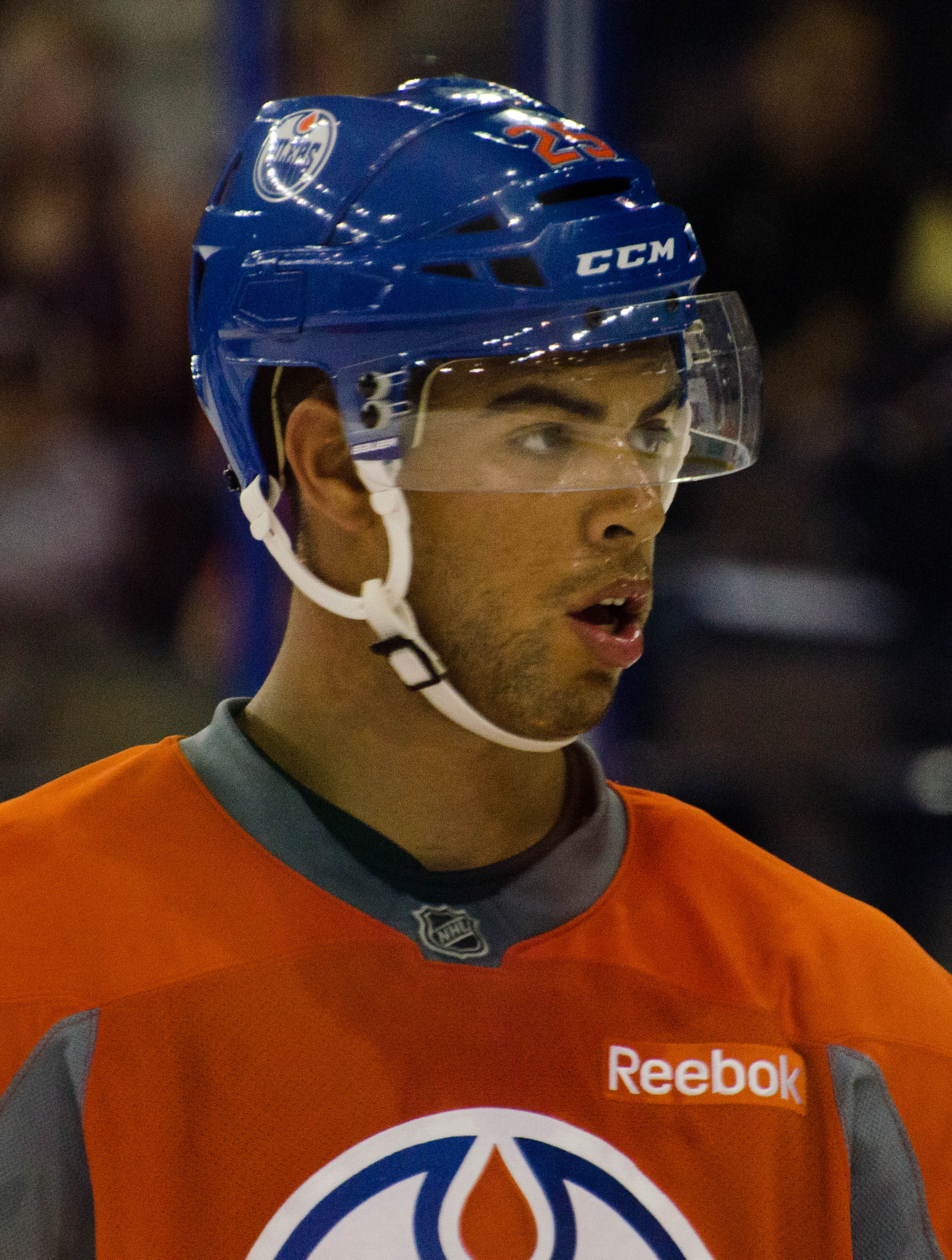
Nurse with the Oilers in 2015

Nurse made the Oilers' opening night roster for the 2014–15 season, but did not partake in the team's first three games. He made his NHL debut on October 14, 2014, in a 6–1 loss to the Los Angeles Kings. After skating in two games for the team, the Oilers sent Nurse back to the Greyhounds on October 17.

Nurse began the 2015–16 season with the Oilers' new AHL affiliate, the Bakersfield Condors. After six games with the Condors, the Oilers recalled Nurse on October 26, 2015. On October 27, Nurse scored his first NHL goal in a 4–3 loss to the Minnesota Wild. On March 10, 2016, Nurse was suspended three games for "serving as the aggressor" during an altercation with San Jose Sharks defenceman Roman Polák. He finished his rookie season skating in 69 games for the Oilers and nine for the Condors.

On December 12, 2016, the Oilers announced Nurse underwent successful ankle surgery that would sideline him for up to 12 weeks. After a 35-game absence, he returned on February 26, 2017, in a 5–4 loss to the Nashville Predators.

On September 17, 2018, the Oilers re-signed Nurse to a two-year, $6.4 million contract extension.

On October 1, 2019, Nurse, alongside Leon Draisaitl, was named an alternate captain for the Oilers. On February 10, 2020, the Oilers signed Nurse to a two-year, $11.2 million contract extension.

On August 6, 2021, Nurse signed an eight-year, $74 million extension with the Oilers.

=== San Jose Sharks ===
On July 1, 2026, Nurse was traded by the Oilers to the San Jose Sharks in exchange for Shakir Mukhamadullin and the rights to Zack Sharp.

On September 30, the Sharks named Nurse as alternate captain for road games during the 2026–27 season.

Nurse made his Sharks debut in the season opener on October 1. Two days later, he played his 800th NHL game, against the Los Angeles Kings.

== International play ==
Medal record

Men's ice hockey

Representing Canada

World Championships
Silver medal – second place	2019 Slovakia	

World Junior Championships
Gold medal – first place	2015 Canada	

World U18 Championships
Bronze medal – third place	2012 Brno	

During the 2011–12 season he won a bronze medal with Team Ontario at the 2012 World U-17 Hockey Challenge and was named to the Tournament All-Star Team. That same season, Nurse was one of only four underage players to play for Canada under-18 team at the 2012 World U18 Championships, winning the bronze medal.

During the 2012–13 season he again played for the under-18 team and won a gold medal at the 2012 Ivan Hlinka Memorial Tournament. Nurse was also an invited participant at the 2013 CHL Top Prospects Game.

He won gold with Canada junior team at the 2015 World Junior Championships and was named one of Canada's top three players, as well as the player of the match for the gold medal game against Russia.

On April 12, 2018, Nurse and teammates Connor McDavid and Ryan Nugent-Hopkins were named to Canada senior team's roster for the 2018 World Championship.

On April 29, 2019, Nurse returned to the international stage to be named to Canada's roster for the 2019 World Championship. Nurse helped Canada progress through to the playoff rounds before losing the final to Finland to finish with the silver medal on May 26. He completed the tournament posting 2 goals and 4 points from the blueline in 10 games.

On May 5, 2026, Nurse and Oilers teammate Evan Bouchard were added to Canada's roster for the 2026 World Championship.

== Activism ==
On August 1, 2020, after the murder of George Floyd, Nurse supported Matt Dumba when he became the first NHL player to kneel during the U.S. national anthem. Dumba, a Filipino-Canadian member of the Hockey Diversity Alliance, was a member of the Minnesota Wild but he was not playing that night. Two Black players from the teams who were playing placed their hands on his shoulders while he knelt: Nurse of the Edmonton Oilers and Malcolm Subban of the Chicago Blackhawks. The three of them remained in this position during both the American and Canadian national anthems. Dumba then gave a speech about racism while the screens in the rink displayed the messaged "END RACISM."

== Personal life ==
Nurse attended St. Thomas More Catholic Secondary School and St. Mary's College, where he was awarded the Bobby Smith Trophy for "OHL Scholastic Player of the Year" following the 2012–13 season.

Nurse and his wife have three sons.

=== Family sports connections ===
He is the son of former Canadian Football League wide receiver Richard Nurse. His sister, Kia, plays for the Toronto Tempo of the Women's National Basketball Association (WNBA). She won two NCAA championships with the Connecticut Huskies, and is a member of the Canada women's basketball team. His cousin Sarah Nurse won a gold medal at the 2022 Winter Olympics with Canada women's ice hockey team and silver medals at the 2018 Winter Olympics and 2026 Winter Olympics and is a forward for the Vancouver Goldeneyes of the Professional Women's Hockey League (PWHL). His uncle Donovan McNabb was an National Football League (NFL) quarterback who played in six Pro Bowls and had his number retired by the Philadelphia Eagles. Darnell's cousin Isaac is a professional ice hockey player for the Florida Everblades of the ECHL.

== Career statistics ==
=== Regular season and playoffs ===
			Regular season					Playoffs
Season	Team	League	GP	G	A	Pts	PIM	GP	G	A	Pts	PIM
2010–11	St. Michael's Buzzers	OJHL	2	0	0	0	4	—	—	—	—	—
2011–12	Sault Ste. Marie Greyhounds	OHL	53	1	9	10	61	—	—	—	—	—
2012–13	Sault Ste. Marie Greyhounds	OHL	68	12	29	41	116	6	1	3	4	6
2013–14	Sault Ste. Marie Greyhounds	OHL	64	13	37	50	91	9	3	5	8	12
2013–14	Oklahoma City Barons	AHL	4	0	1	1	0	3	0	1	1	7
2014–15	Edmonton Oilers	NHL	2	0	0	0	0	—	—	—	—	—
2014–15	Sault Ste. Marie Greyhounds	OHL	36	10	23	33	58	14	3	5	8	26
2015–16	Bakersfield Condors	AHL	9	0	2	2	7	—	—	—	—	—
2015–16	Edmonton Oilers	NHL	69	3	7	10	60	—	—	—	—	—
2016–17	Edmonton Oilers	NHL	44	5	6	11	33	13	0	2	2	6
2017–18	Edmonton Oilers	NHL	82	6	20	26	67	—	—	—	—	—
2018–19	Edmonton Oilers	NHL	82	10	31	41	87	—	—	—	—	—
2019–20	Edmonton Oilers	NHL	71	5	28	33	48	4	0	2	2	6
2020–21	Edmonton Oilers	NHL	56	16	20	36	57	4	0	1	1	2
2021–22	Edmonton Oilers	NHL	71	9	26	35	54	15	2	4	6	26
2022–23	Edmonton Oilers	NHL	82	12	31	43	64	11	0	4	4	21
2023–24	Edmonton Oilers	NHL	81	10	22	32	79	25	2	4	6	12
2024–25	Edmonton Oilers	NHL	76	5	28	33	72	22	3	5	8	31
2025–26	Edmonton Oilers	NHL	82	7	17	24	104	6	0	0	0	4
NHL totals			798	88	236	324	725	100	7	22	29	108

=== International ===
Year	Team	Event	Result	GP	G	A	Pts	PIM
2012	Canada Ontario	U17	3rd place, bronze medalist(s)	5	1	2	3	8
2012	Canada	U18	3rd place, bronze medalist(s)	7	0	0	0	14
2012	Canada	IH18	1st place, gold medalist(s)	5	0	0	0	4
2015	Canada	WJC	1st place, gold medalist(s)	7	0	1	1	6
2018	Canada	WC	4th	10	0	1	1	4
2019	Canada	WC	2nd place, silver medalist(s)	10	2	2	4	8
2026	Canada	WC	4th	10	0	6	6	2
Junior totals				24	1	3	4	32
Senior totals				30	2	9	11	14

== Awards and honours ==
Awards	Year	Ref
World U-17 Hockey Challenge All-Star Team	2012	
CHL Top Prospects Game	2013	

== See also ==
- Black players in ice hockey

Awards and achievements
Preceded by Nail Yakupov	Edmonton Oilers first round draft pick 2013	Succeeded by Leon Draisaitl
