= Victor Öhman =

Victor Öhman may refer to:

- Victor Öhman (ice hockey, born 1992), Swedish ice hockey player
- Victor Öhman (ice hockey, born 1995), Swedish ice hockey player
