= Robert Hägg =

Swedish ice hockey player (born 1995)

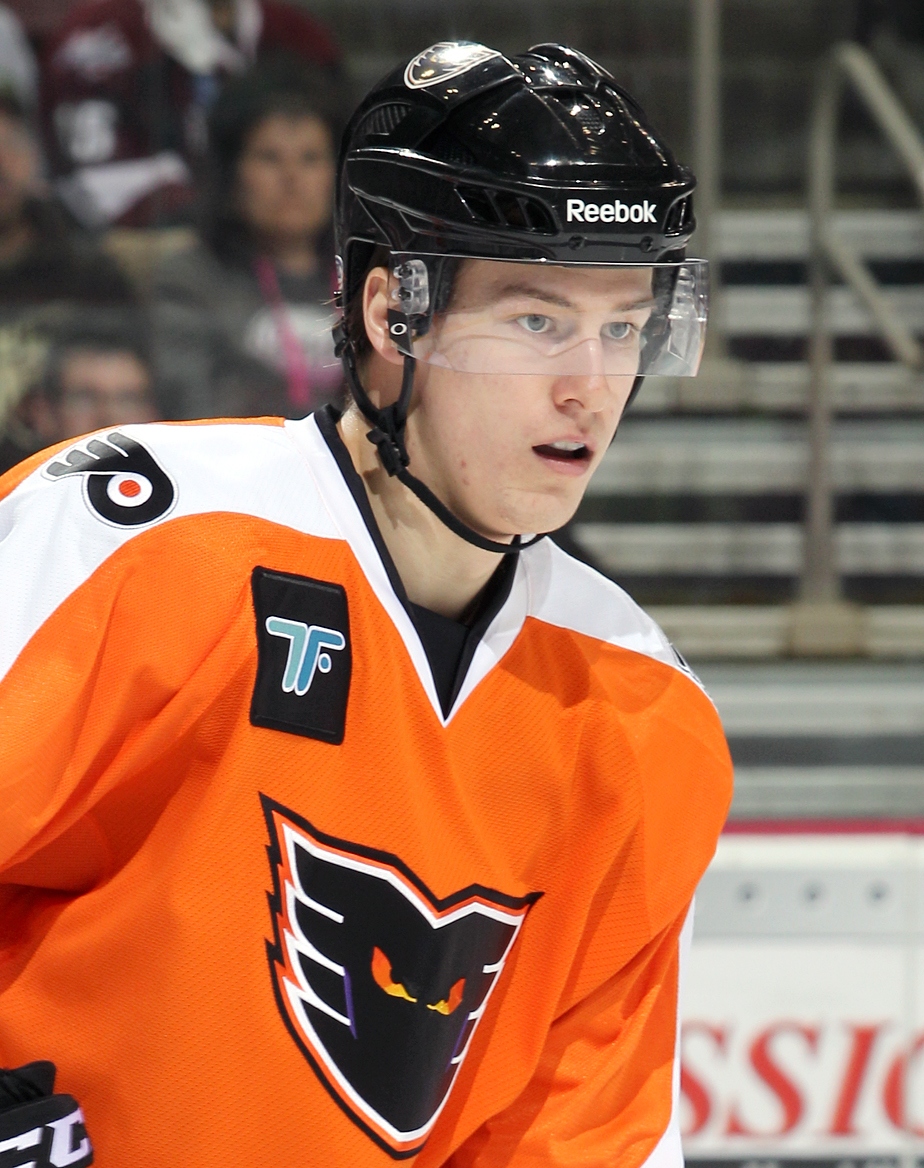
- Hägg with the Adirondack Phantoms in 2014
- Born: 8 February 1995 (age 31) Uppsala, Sweden
- Height: 6 ft 2 in (188 cm)
- Weight: 210 lb (95 kg; 15 st 0 lb)
- Position: Defence
- Shoots: Left
- SHL team Former teams: Brynäs IF; Modo Hockey; Philadelphia Flyers; Buffalo Sabres; Florida Panthers; Detroit Red Wings; Anaheim Ducks; Vegas Golden Knights
- National team: Sweden
- NHL draft: 41st overall, 2013; Philadelphia Flyers
- Playing career: 2012–present

Robert Hägg (born 8 February 1995) is a Swedish professional ice hockey player who is a defenceman for Brynäs IF of the Swedish Hockey League (SHL). He was drafted in the second round, 41st overall, by the Philadelphia Flyers in the 2013 NHL entry draft.

== Playing career ==
=== Junior ===
Hägg started his hockey career at age 13 playing for Gimo IF in Gimo. In his second season, at age 14, Hägg recorded 16 points in 32 games played for Gimo IF. In the 2010–11 season, playing for Modo under-16 team, Hägg had a breakout year, leading the under-16 league in assists and points by a defenceman. Additionally, he won the under-16 league's defenceman of the year award.

=== Professional ===
Hägg was selected by the Philadelphia Flyers of the National Hockey League (NHL) in the second round, 41st overall, of the 2013 NHL entry draft. On 21 March 2014, the Philadelphia Flyers signed Hägg to a three-year entry-level contract. Following the end of the 2013–14 season in the SHL, Hägg played the final ten games of the Flyers' American Hockey League (AHL) affiliate, the Adirondack Phantoms, season. For the 2014–15 season, he was assigned to the Flyers' new AHL affiliate, the Lehigh Valley Phantoms, to develop. Hägg made his NHL debut on 9 April 2017 against the Carolina Hurricanes in the last game of the Flyers regular season.

During the 2017–18 season Hägg recorded his first NHL goal in a 4–3 win over the Detroit Red Wings on 21 December 2017. Hägg led the NHL in hits with 232 and rookies in blocked shots before being pulled out of the lineup with a lower body injury on 10 March 2018. In the following 2018–19 season, Hägg played in all 82 games. However, in the 2019–20 season Hägg was a healthy scratch in 20 of Philadelphia's first 69 games. He finished the season appearing in 49 games, scoring three goals and 13 points. On 28 September 2020, Hägg signed a two-year $3.2 million contract extension with the Flyers. He appeared in 34 games during the 2020–21 season scoring two goals and five points. On 18 March 2021, Hägg suffered a shoulder injury in a 9–0 loss to the New York Rangers that kept him out of the lineup for two weeks.

On 23 July 2021, Hägg was traded by the Flyers to the Buffalo Sabres, along with a 2021 first-round pick and a 2023 second-round pick, in exchange for defenceman Rasmus Ristolainen. In the 2021–22 season, Hägg continued his role as a physical third-pairing defenceman for the Sabres. He was leading the team in hits and short-handed time on ice while collecting eight points through 48 regular season games. Hägg was traded by the Sabres before the NHL trade deadline to the Florida Panthers in exchange for a 2022 sixth-round pick on 20 March 2022. After joining the Panthers, Hägg was slotted into the third pairing alongside Brandon Montour. He made his Panthers debut against the Montreal Canadiens on 24 March, alongside fellow debutants Claude Giroux and Ben Chiarot and assisted on Aleksander Barkov's game-tying goal in a 4–3 win.

On 25 July 2022, Hägg signed a one-year, $800,000 contract with the Detroit Red Wings. He was signed by Detroit after it was announced that fellow new signing Mark Pysyk would miss the first half of the 2022–23 season due to an injury. Hägg missed part of training camp after being struck in the head by a puck. He made his Red Wings debut in 3–0 shutout win over the Montreal Canadiens on opening night, taking a minor penalty for slashing. Hägg was placed on injured reserve with an undisclosed injury on 13 December, after registering two points in 13 games with Detroit, and returned to action on 16 January 2023. Hägg scored his first goal for Detroit on 22 February, against Darcy Kuemper in a 3–1 win over the Washington Capitals. He appeared in 38 games with Detroit, recording two goals and five assists for seven points.

As an unrestricted free agent from the Red Wings, Hägg joined his fifth NHL team in signing a one-year, $775,000 contract with the Anaheim Ducks for the 2023–24 season on 4 July 2023. He was assigned to Anaheim's AHL affiliate, the San Diego Gulls, to start the season. Hägg was recalled on 25 October, but was scratched for all five games he was with the team for before being returned to the AHL on 5 November. He was recalled again on 9 January 2024, and made his season and team debut with Anaheim on 11 January, versus the Carolina Hurricanes. Hägg was returned to San Diego on 28 January, after appearing in five games, registering no points.

Following the 2023–24 season, Hägg signed a one-year contract with the Vegas Golden Knights on 2 July 2024. He was assigned to Vegas' AHL affiliate, the Henderson Silver Knights, for the 2024–25 season. After being recalled to the Golden Knights in mid-November, Hägg subsequently debuted for Vegas on 21 November, playing just under nine minutes in a 3–2 victory over the Ottawa Senators. He made one more appearance with Vegas in late in November, before spending the rest of the season with the Silver Knights.

On 28 May 2025, Hägg signed a one-year contract with Brynäs IF of the Swedish Hockey League.

== International play ==
Medal record

Men's ice hockey

Representing Sweden

World Junior Championships
Silver medal – second place	2013 Ufa	
Silver medal – second place	2014 Malmö	

Hägg played throughout his junior career at the international stage for Sweden junior team. He played for Sweden at the 2012 World U-17 Hockey Challenge, leading all defencemen in scoring during the event with six points. He won a bronze medal at the 2012 Ivan Hlinka Memorial Tournament and a silver medal at the 2013 World Junior Championships. Hägg won a second silver medal at the 2014 World Junior Championships. Hägg appeared in his third World Junior Championships in 2015 where Sweden finished in fourth place.

On 9 May 2019, Hägg was named to Sweden senior team for the 2019 World Championship. Sweden was defeated in the quarterfinals by Finland and finished the tournament in fifth place.

== Career statistics ==
=== Regular season and playoffs ===
			Regular season					Playoffs
Season	Team	League	GP	G	A	Pts	PIM	GP	G	A	Pts	PIM
2008–09	Gimo IF	SWE.4	23	0	0	0	6	—	—	—	—	—
2009–10	Gimo IF	SWE.4	32	7	9	16	28	—	—	—	—	—
2010–11	Tierps HK	SWE.3	30	2	9	11	30	—	—	—	—	—
2010–11	Modo Hockey	J18 Allsv	2	0	0	0	2	—	—	—	—	—
2011–12	Modo Hockey	J18	3	0	4	4	8	—	—	—	—	—
2011–12	Modo Hockey	J18 Allsv	2	1	0	1	2	1	0	0	0	0
2011–12	Modo Hockey	J20	44	4	13	17	46	8	1	1	2	2
2012–13	Modo Hockey	J20	28	11	13	24	24	7	1	1	2	4
2012–13	Modo Hockey	SEL	27	0	1	1	2	1	0	0	0	0
2012–13	Modo Hockey	J18 Allsv	—	—	—	—	—	2	1	1	2	0
2013–14	Modo Hockey	J20	8	1	6	7	6	2	1	0	1	2
2013–14	Modo Hockey	SHL	50	1	5	6	47	2	0	0	0	4
2013–14	Adirondack Phantoms	AHL	10	1	3	4	10	—	—	—	—	—
2014–15	Lehigh Valley Phantoms	AHL	69	3	17	20	42	—	—	—	—	—
2015–16	Lehigh Valley Phantoms	AHL	65	5	6	11	42	—	—	—	—	—
2016–17	Lehigh Valley Phantoms	AHL	58	7	8	15	48	5	0	1	1	0
2016–17	Philadelphia Flyers	NHL	1	0	0	0	0	—	—	—	—	—
2017–18	Philadelphia Flyers	NHL	70	3	6	9	32	2	0	0	0	0
2018–19	Philadelphia Flyers	NHL	82	5	15	20	63	—	—	—	—	—
2019–20	Philadelphia Flyers	NHL	49	3	10	13	30	12	0	3	3	6
2020–21	Philadelphia Flyers	NHL	34	2	3	5	18	—	—	—	—	—
2021–22	Buffalo Sabres	NHL	48	1	7	8	25	—	—	—	—	—
2021–22	Florida Panthers	NHL	16	0	1	1	10	—	—	—	—	—
2022–23	Detroit Red Wings	NHL	38	2	5	7	26	—	—	—	—	—
2023–24	San Diego Gulls	AHL	47	3	9	12	38	—	—	—	—	—
2023–24	Anaheim Ducks	NHL	5	0	0	0	4	—	—	—	—	—
2024–25	Henderson Silver Knights	AHL	57	7	22	29	44	—	—	—	—	—
2024–25	Vegas Golden Knights	NHL	2	0	0	0	0	—	—	—	—	—
2025–26	Brynäs IF	SHL	52	4	11	15	60	5	0	0	0	2
SHL totals			129	5	17	22	109	8	0	0	0	6
NHL totals			345	16	47	63	208	14	0	3	3	6

=== International ===
Year	Team	Event	Result	GP	G	A	Pts	PIM
2012	Sweden	U17	4th	6	2	4	6	16
2012	Sweden	IH18	3rd place, bronze medalist(s)	4	3	2	5	35
2013	Sweden	WJC	2nd place, silver medalist(s)	5	1	1	2	0
2013	Sweden	U18	5th	5	1	3	4	12
2014	Sweden	WJC	2nd place, silver medalist(s)	7	1	0	1	12
2015	Sweden	WJC	4th	7	0	2	2	2
2019	Sweden	WC	5th	8	0	0	0	4
2026	Sweden	WC	7th	8	1	1	2	2
Junior totals				34	8	12	20	77
Senior totals				16	1	1	2	6
