= Zbořil =

Zbořil (feminine: Zbořilová) is a Czech surname. Notable people with the surname include:

- Adam Zbořil (born 1995), Czech ice hockey player
- Jakub Zbořil (born 1997), Czech ice hockey player
