= Sergey Tolchinsky =

Russian professional ice hockey forward (born 1995)

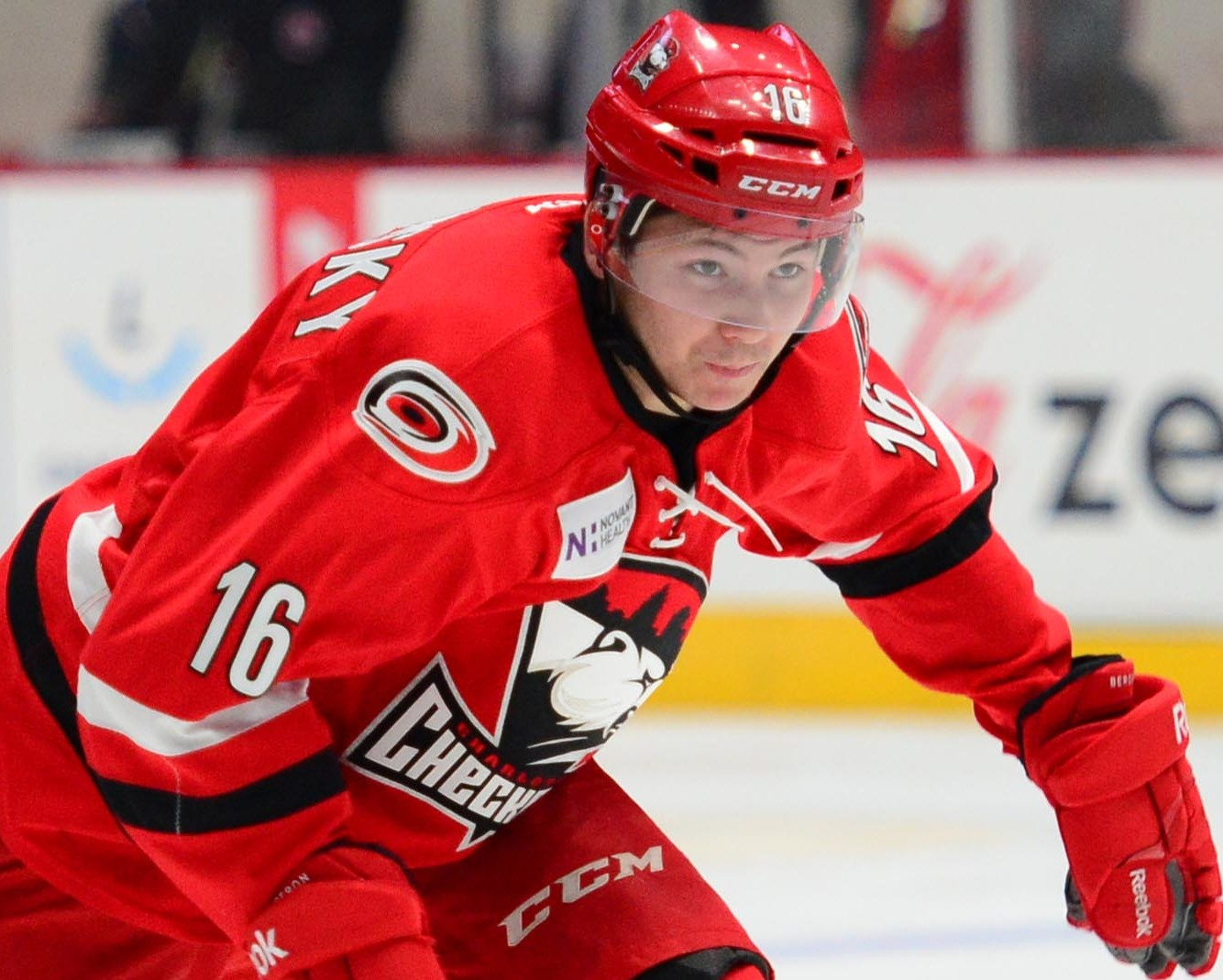
- Tolchinsky with the Charlotte Checkers in 2015
- Born: February 3, 1995 (age 31) Moscow, Russia
- Height: 5 ft 8 in (173 cm)
- Weight: 170 lb (77 kg; 12 st 2 lb)
- Position: Left wing
- Shoots: Left
- KHL team Former teams: Metallurg Magnitogorsk; Carolina Hurricanes; CSKA Moscow; Avangard Omsk; SKA Saint Petersburg
- National team: Russia
- NHL draft: Undrafted
- Playing career: 2014–present

Sergey Aleksandrovich Tolchinsky (Russian: Сергей Александрович Толчинский; born February 3, 1995) is a Russian professional ice hockey forward who is currently playing with Metallurg Magnitogorsk of the Kontinental Hockey League (KHL). He has formerly played with the Carolina Hurricanes of the National Hockey League (NHL).

== Playing career ==
Tolchinsky played in the 2008 Quebec International Pee-Wee Hockey Tournament with the HC CSKA Moscow youth team. Undrafted, Tolchinsky played with Krasnaya Armiya Moscow in the Minor Hockey League in Russia before opting to continue his junior career in North America with the Sault Ste. Marie Greyhounds of the Ontario Hockey League.

On August 22, 2013, Tolchinsky was signed to a three-year entry-level contract with the Carolina Hurricanes. He was returned to the Greyhounds of the OHL to continue his development in the 2013–14 season. At the conclusion of his second season with Sault Ste. Marie, Tolchinsky was signed to an amateur try-out contract with the Hurricanes AHL affiliate, the Charlotte Checkers to make his professional debut in a single game to end the year.

In the 2015–16 season, his first full professional year, Tolchinsky was recalled to make his NHL debut with the Carolina Hurricanes on March 31, 2016.

In his final year under contract with the Hurricanes, Tolchinsky continued with the Checkers in the AHL for the 2017–18 season. Unable to add to his NHL experience, Tolchinsky appeared in 43 regular season games for 26 points. On May 7, 2018, with Tolchinsky not appearing in the post-season, the Checkers confirmed that he had left the team at his request and returned to Russia as an impending restricted free agent from the Hurricanes.

On June 21, 2018, it was announced that Tolchinsky had returned to former club CSKA Moscow, on an initial try-out basis.

After two seasons within CSKA Moscow, Tolchinsky left at the conclusion of his contract to sign a two-year contract with his second KHL club, Avangard Omsk, on 8 May 2020. In the 2020–21 season, while playing on Avangard's top scoring line Tolchinsky broke out offensively, recording career best marks with 15 goals, 31 assists for 46 points through 51 regular season games. As the second placed Eastern conference team, Tolchinsky continued his standout play in the post-season with Avangard, leading the club with 20 points in 24 playoff games scoring. He scored the championship clinching goal, in a 1–0 victory, to help Avangard Omsk to their first Gagarin Cup on 29 April 2020. He was named as the KHL Playoffs MVP in collecting his second Gagarin cup.

Following three seasons with Avangard Omsk, Tolchinsky left the club as a free agent and transferred to SKA Saint Petersburg, by signing a five-year contract through 2028 on 23 May 2023.

After just two seasons with SKA, Tolchinsky opted to mutually leave the club and was signed to a two-year contract with Metallurg Magnitogorsk on 8 July 2025.

== Career statistics ==
=== Regular season and playoffs ===
			Regular season					Playoffs
Season	Team	League	GP	G	A	Pts	PIM	GP	G	A	Pts	PIM
2011–12	Krasnaya Armiya	MHL	51	19	15	34	26	15	2	2	4	6
2012–13	Sault Ste. Marie Greyhounds	OHL	62	26	25	51	12	6	2	2	4	4
2013–14	Sault Ste. Marie Greyhounds	OHL	66	31	60	91	22	9	2	4	6	4
2013–14	Charlotte Checkers	AHL	1	0	0	0	0	—	—	—	—	—
2014–15	Sault Ste. Marie Greyhounds	OHL	61	30	65	95	10	14	4	10	14	2
2015–16	Charlotte Checkers	AHL	72	14	22	36	28	—	—	—	—	—
2015–16	Carolina Hurricanes	NHL	2	0	1	1	0	—	—	—	—	—
2016–17	Charlotte Checkers	AHL	59	7	16	23	41	1	0	1	1	0
2016–17	Carolina Hurricanes	NHL	2	0	1	1	0	—	—	—	—	—
2017–18	Charlotte Checkers	AHL	43	7	19	26	22	—	—	—	—	—
2018–19	CSKA Moscow	KHL	37	9	4	13	10	—	—	—	—	—
2018–19	Zvezda Chekhov	VHL	6	1	3	4	0	5	0	1	1	4
2019–20	CSKA Moscow	KHL	40	14	8	22	22	3	0	0	0	2
2019–20	Zvezda Chekhov	VHL	4	3	1	4	27	—	—	—	—	—
2020–21	Avangard Omsk	KHL	51	15	31	46	20	24	6	14	20	12
2021–22	Avangard Omsk	KHL	30	5	22	27	14	13	2	5	7	4
2022–23	Avangard Omsk	KHL	68	16	40	56	20	14	5	2	7	4
2023–24	SKA Saint Petersburg	KHL	67	18	36	54	24	10	3	1	4	2
2024–25	SKA Saint Petersburg	KHL	48	7	9	16	18	4	0	0	0	0
2025–26	Metallurg Magnitogorsk	KHL	60	16	22	38	22	15	3	6	9	4
NHL totals			4	0	2	2	0	—	—	—	—	—
KHL totals			401	100	172	272	150	83	19	28	47	28

=== International ===
Year	Team	Event	Result	GP	G	A	Pts	PIM
2012	Russia	U17	1st place, gold medalist(s)	5	3	0	3	14
2012	Russia	IH18	5th	4	3	1	4	0
2013	Russia	U18	4th	7	3	1	4	2
2015	Russia	WJC	2nd place, silver medalist(s)	7	4	1	5	4
2021	ROC	WC	5th	7	3	2	5	2
Junior totals				23	13	3	16	20
Senior totals				7	3	2	5	2

== Awards and honors ==
Award	Year
OHL
Third All-Star Team	2015
KHL
Gagarin Cup (CSKA Moscow)	2019
Gagarin Cup (Avangard Omsk)	2021
Playoffs MVP	2021
