= Hudson Fasching =

American ice hockey player (born 1995)

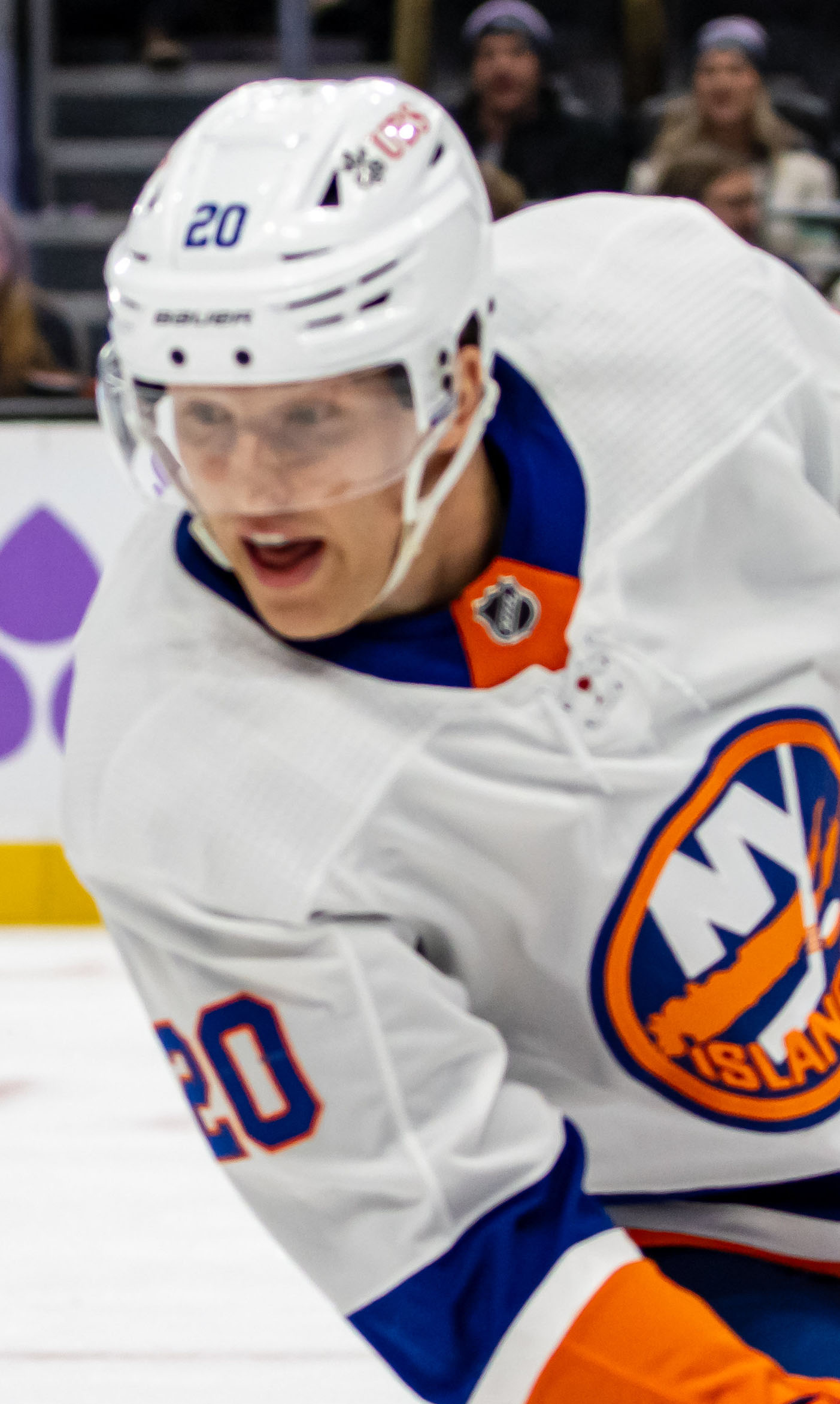
- Fasching with the New York Islanders in November 2023
- Born: July 28, 1995 (age 31) Milwaukee, Wisconsin, U.S.
- Height: 6 ft 2 in (188 cm)
- Weight: 207 lb (94 kg; 14 st 11 lb)
- Position: Right wing
- Shoots: Right
- SHL team Former teams: Skellefteå AIK; Buffalo Sabres; Arizona Coyotes; New York Islanders
- National team: United States
- NHL draft: 118th overall, 2013; Los Angeles Kings
- Playing career: 2016–present

Hudson Fasching (born July 28, 1995) is an American professional ice hockey winger who is currently under contract with Skellefteå AIK of the Swedish Hockey League (SHL).

== Playing career ==
=== Amateur ===
Fasching played high school hockey for Apple Valley High School in Apple Valley, Minnesota. He then played two seasons for the USA Hockey National Team Development Program in the United States Hockey League.

=== Collegiate ===
Fasching committed to the University of Minnesota in December 2011. He was named to the Big Ten Conference's All-Freshman team after the 2013–14 season.

As a member of the Golden Gophers, Fasching recorded 94 points (46 goals and 48 assists) in 115 career games. He helped the Gophers win three straight regular-season championships. His junior year, his final year at the school, he was an alternate captain and finished tied for first on the team in goals.

=== Professional ===
==== Buffalo Sabres ====
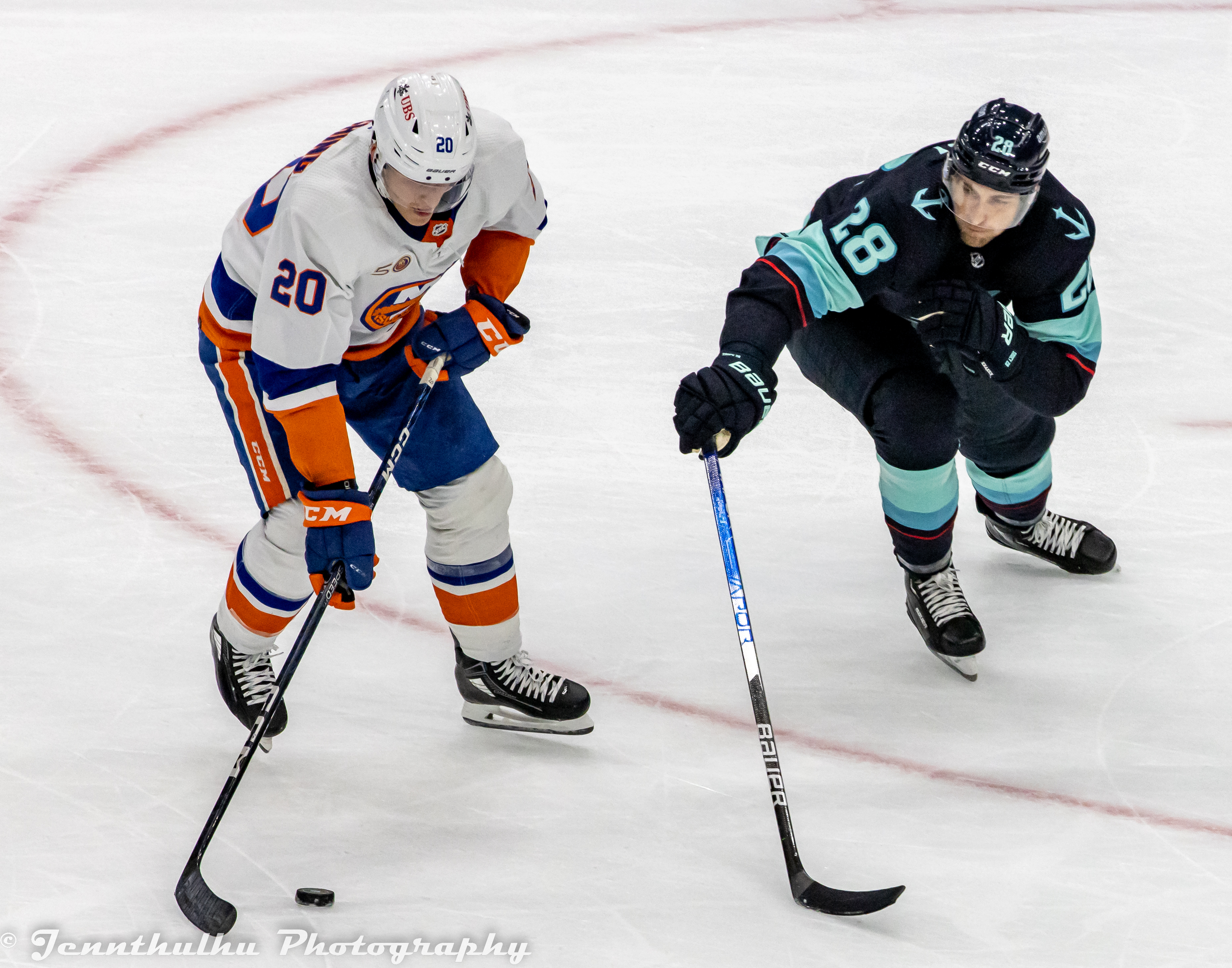
Fasching (left) and Carson Soucy during a game in 2023

Fasching was drafted by the Los Angeles Kings in the fourth round, 118th overall, of the 2013 NHL entry draft. On March 5, 2014, Fasching's rights were traded, along with Nicolas Deslauriers and a draft pick, to the Buffalo Sabres in exchange for Brayden McNabb, Jonathan Parker and two draft picks.

On March 21, 2016, Fasching was signed to an entry-level pro contract by the Sabres. He made his NHL debut with the team on March 26, scoring his first NHL goal at 8:37 of the first period in a game against the Winnipeg Jets. Fasching eventually fell out of favor with Sabres management when a new regime took over in 2017; his first goal would be his only goal in 22 appearances with the Sabres. By the end of the 2017–18 season, the Sabres' farm team, the Rochester Americans, designated him a healthy scratch.

==== Arizona Coyotes ====
On June 14, 2018, Fasching was traded, after two full seasons with the Sabres, to the Arizona Coyotes in exchange for Brandon Hickey and Mike Sislo.

==== New York Islanders ====
On August 23, 2022, having left the Coyotes as a free agent, Fasching signed a one-year, two-way contract with the New York Islanders. Fasching was called up from the Bridgeport Islanders on December 1, 2022, and became a regular in the lineup, scoring 10 goals for the team through the 2022–23 season.

On May 1, 2023, the Islanders signed Fasching to a two-year contract extension.

==== Columbus Blue Jackets ====
Following three seasons within the Islanders organization, Fasching left as a free agent and was signed to a one-year, two-way contract with the Columbus Blue Jackets for the 2025–26 season on August 18, 2025.

==== Skellefteå AIK ====
As a free agent after 11 professional seasons in North America, Fasching opted to sign his first contract abroad in signing a one-year contract with Swedish club, Skellefteå AIK of the SHL, on August 7, 2026.

== International play ==
Fasching represented the United States in the 2012 World U-17 Hockey Challenge, winning a silver medal. He also was part of the silver medal-winning American team at the 2013 IIHF World U18 Championships.

He played for the United States men's national junior ice hockey team at the IIHF World U20 Championship in both 2014 and 2015.

== Career statistics ==
=== Regular season and playoffs ===
			Regular season					Playoffs
Season	Team	League	GP	G	A	Pts	PIM	GP	G	A	Pts	PIM
2009–10	Apple Valley High School	HSMN	31	24	18	42	12	6	4	2	6	0
2010–11	Apple Valley High School	HSMN	28	18	32	50	16	3	2	3	5	2
2011–12	U.S. NTDP Juniors	USHL	37	7	14	21	38	1	1	1	2	2
2011–12	U.S. NTDP U17	USDP	54	16	20	36	52	—	—	—	—	—
2011–12	U.S. NTDP U18	USDP	1	0	0	0	0	—	—	—	—	—
2012–13	U.S. NTDP Juniors	USHL	25	4	7	11	8	—	—	—	—	—
2012–13	U.S. NTDP U18	USDP	62	10	23	33	43	—	—	—	—	—
2013–14	University of Minnesota	B1G	40	14	16	30	22	—	—	—	—	—
2014–15	University of Minnesota	B1G	38	12	14	26	24	—	—	—	—	—
2015–16	University of Minnesota	B1G	37	20	18	38	16	—	—	—	—	—
2015–16	Buffalo Sabres	NHL	7	1	1	2	4	—	—	—	—	—
2016–17	Buffalo Sabres	NHL	10	0	1	1	2	—	—	—	—	—
2016–17	Rochester Americans	AHL	34	7	4	11	8	—	—	—	—	—
2017–18	Rochester Americans	AHL	69	12	18	30	40	1	0	0	0	0
2017–18	Buffalo Sabres	NHL	5	0	0	0	2	—	—	—	—	—
2018–19	Tucson Roadrunners	AHL	64	16	17	33	16	—	—	—	—	—
2019–20	Tucson Roadrunners	AHL	57	19	16	35	15	—	—	—	—	—
2020–21	Arizona Coyotes	NHL	5	0	0	0	0	—	—	—	—	—
2020–21	Tucson Roadrunners	AHL	2	0	1	1	0	—	—	—	—	—
2021–22	Tucson Roadrunners	AHL	51	14	23	37	18	—	—	—	—	—
2021–22	Arizona Coyotes	NHL	11	0	0	0	0	—	—	—	—	—
2022–23	Bridgeport Islanders	AHL	18	7	4	11	4	—	—	—	—	—
2022–23	New York Islanders	NHL	49	10	9	19	10	6	0	0	0	2
2023–24	New York Islanders	NHL	45	4	10	14	6	4	0	0	0	2
2023–24	Bridgeport Islanders	AHL	3	1	0	1	0	—	—	—	—	—
2024–25	New York Islanders	NHL	43	2	2	4	6	—	—	—	—	—
2024–25	Bridgeport Islanders	AHL	7	1	1	2	4	—	—	—	—	—
2025–26	Cleveland Monsters	AHL	65	7	11	18	12	9	4	3	7	7
NHL totals			175	17	23	40	30	10	0	0	0	4

=== International ===
Year	Team	Event	Result	GP	G	A	Pts	PIM
2012	United States	U17	2nd place, silver medalist(s)	5	4	2	6	2
2013	United States	U18	2nd place, silver medalist(s)	7	0	6	6	4
2014	United States	WJC	5th	5	2	2	4	2
2015	United States	WJC	5th	5	1	2	3	4
2016	United States	WC	4th	10	0	2	2	0
Junior totals				22	7	12	19	12
Senior totals				10	0	2	2	0
