= Anthony Louis =

American ice hockey center (born 1995)

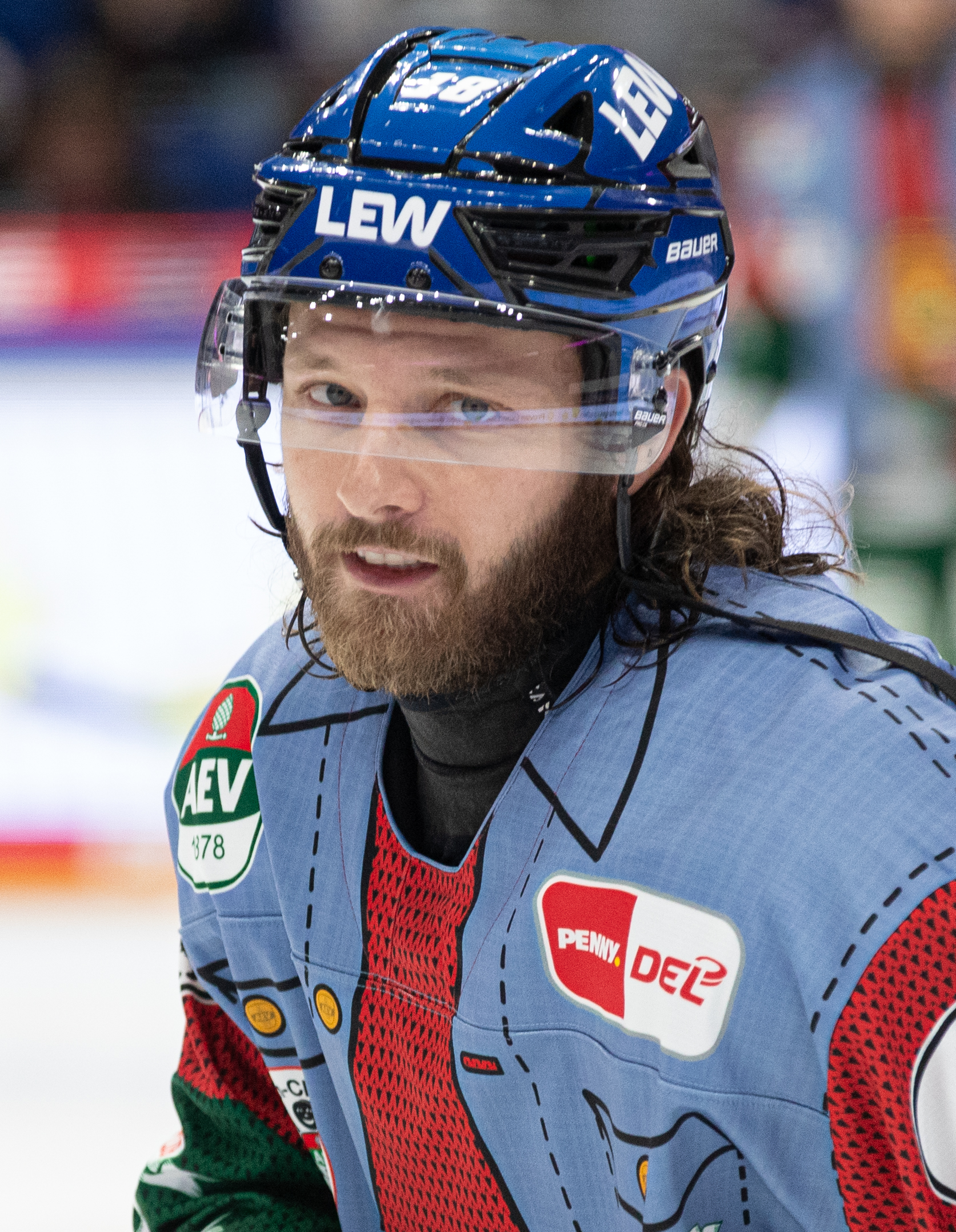
- Anthony Louis in 2025
- Born: February 10, 1995 (age 31) Winfield, Illinois, U.S.
- Height: 5 ft 7 in (170 cm)
- Weight: 150 lb (68 kg; 10 st 10 lb)
- Position: Center
- Shoots: Left
- DEL team Former teams: Augsburger Panther; Rockford IceHogs; Charlotte Checkers; Texas Stars; Barys Astana; SCL Tigers
- NHL draft: 181st overall, 2013; Chicago Blackhawks
- Playing career: 2017–present

Anthony Louis (born February 10, 1995) is an American professional ice hockey center currently playing under contract with Augsburger Panther of the Deutsche Eishockey Liga (DEL). He was drafted 181st overall by the Chicago Blackhawks in the 6th round of the 2013 NHL entry draft.

== Playing career ==
Louis played for Miami University from 2013–2017 until he was signed by the Chicago Blackhawks. During his collegiate career for the Miami RedHawks, Louis set a career highs in his senior season in 2016–17 season, with 14 goals and 39 points in 36 games. He amassed 46 goals and 80 assists in 145 career games across four seasons during his collegiate career.

On March 13, 2017, Louis embarked on his professional career, securing a two-year, entry-level contract with the Chicago Blackhawks. He immediately joined primary AHL affiliate, the Rockford IceHogs, on an amateur try-out deal for the remainder of the season.

As an impending restricted free agent, Louis was not tendered a qualifying offer by the Blackhawks, releasing him as a free agent on June 25, 2019. On August 8, 2019, Louis was signed to a one-year AHL contract with reigning champions, the Charlotte Checkers, affiliate to the Carolina Hurricanes. Louis began the 2019–20 season, registering just 1 goal in 8 games with the Checkers before he was traded to the Texas Stars, affiliate to the Dallas Stars, in exchange for future considerations on November 20, 2019.

After three seasons with the Texas Stars, Louis left as a free agent following the 2021–22 season. On July 15, 2022, his signed his first contract abroad in agreeing to a one-year contract with Kazakhstani club, Barys Nur-Sultan of the KHL.

At the conclusion of his contract with Barys, Louis left the KHL and moved to Switzerland in signing a one-year contract with SCL Tigers of the National League (NL) on August 4, 2023.

After his contract with SCL Tigers ended, Louis entered free agency and signed with Augsburger Panther of the DEL on July 16, 2024, as their tenth import of the season.

== Career statistics ==
=== Regular season and playoffs ===
| | | | Regular season | | | | | Playoffs |
| Season | Team | League | GP | G | A | Pts | PIM | GP | G | A | Pts | PIM |
|---|---|---|---|---|---|---|---|---|---|---|---|---|
| 2011–12 | U.S. National Development Team | USHL | 32 | 16 | 6 | 22 | 12 | — | — | — | — | — |
| 2012–13 | U.S. National Development Team | USHL | 24 | 10 | 15 | 25 | 10 | — | — | — | — | — |
| 2013–14 | Miami RedHawks | NCHC | 36 | 12 | 13 | 25 | 10 | — | — | — | — | — |
| 2014–15 | Miami RedHawks | NCHC | 37 | 9 | 27 | 36 | 8 | — | — | — | — | — |
| 2015–16 | Miami RedHawks | NCHC | 36 | 11 | 15 | 26 | 27 | — | — | — | — | — |
| 2016–17 | Miami RedHawks | NCHC | 36 | 14 | 25 | 39 | 20 | — | — | — | — | — |
| 2016–17 | Rockford IceHogs | AHL | 13 | 1 | 2 | 3 | 4 | — | — | — | — | — |
| 2017–18 | Rockford IceHogs | AHL | 70 | 14 | 30 | 44 | 8 | 9 | 0 | 5 | 5 | 0 |
| 2018–19 | Rockford IceHogs | AHL | 74 | 12 | 22 | 34 | 28 | — | — | — | — | — |
| 2019–20 | Charlotte Checkers | AHL | 8 | 1 | 0 | 1 | 2 | — | — | — | — | — |
| 2019–20 | Texas Stars | AHL | 38 | 9 | 11 | 20 | 10 | — | — | — | — | — |
| 2020–21 | Texas Stars | AHL | 35 | 11 | 15 | 26 | 8 | — | — | — | — | — |
| 2021–22 | Texas Stars | AHL | 66 | 24 | 31 | 55 | 22 | 2 | 0 | 0 | 0 | 0 |
| 2022–23 | Barys Astana | KHL | 57 | 9 | 21 | 30 | 6 | — | — | — | — | — |
| 2023–24 | SCL Tigers | NL | 14 | 3 | 4 | 7 | 0 | — | — | — | — | — |
| 2024–25 | Augsburger Panther | DEL | 44 | 6 | 23 | 29 | 24 | — | — | — | — | — |
| AHL totals | | | 304 | 72 | 111 | 183 | 82 | 11 | 0 | 5 | 5 | 0 |

=== International ===
| Year | Team | Event | Result | GP | G | A | Pts | PIM |
|---|---|---|---|---|---|---|---|---|
| 2012 | United States | U17 | 2nd place, silver medalist(s) | 5 | 3 | 4 | 7 | 2 |
| 2012 | United States | U18 | 1st place, gold medalist(s) | 6 | 0 | 1 | 1 | 2 |
| 2013 | United States | U18 | 2nd place, silver medalist(s) | 7 | 1 | 3 | 4 | 2 |
| 2015 | United States | WJC | 5th | 5 | 0 | 0 | 0 | 2 |
| Junior totals | | | | 23 | 4 | 8 | 12 | 8 |

== Awards and honors ==
| Award | Year |
|---|---|
College
| NCHC First All-Star Team | 2017 |
| NCHC Forward of the Year | 2017 |

Awards and achievements
| Preceded by Danton Heinen | NCHC Forward of the Year; 2016–17 | Succeeded by Henrik Borgström |
