= Max Domi =

Canadian ice hockey player (born 1995)

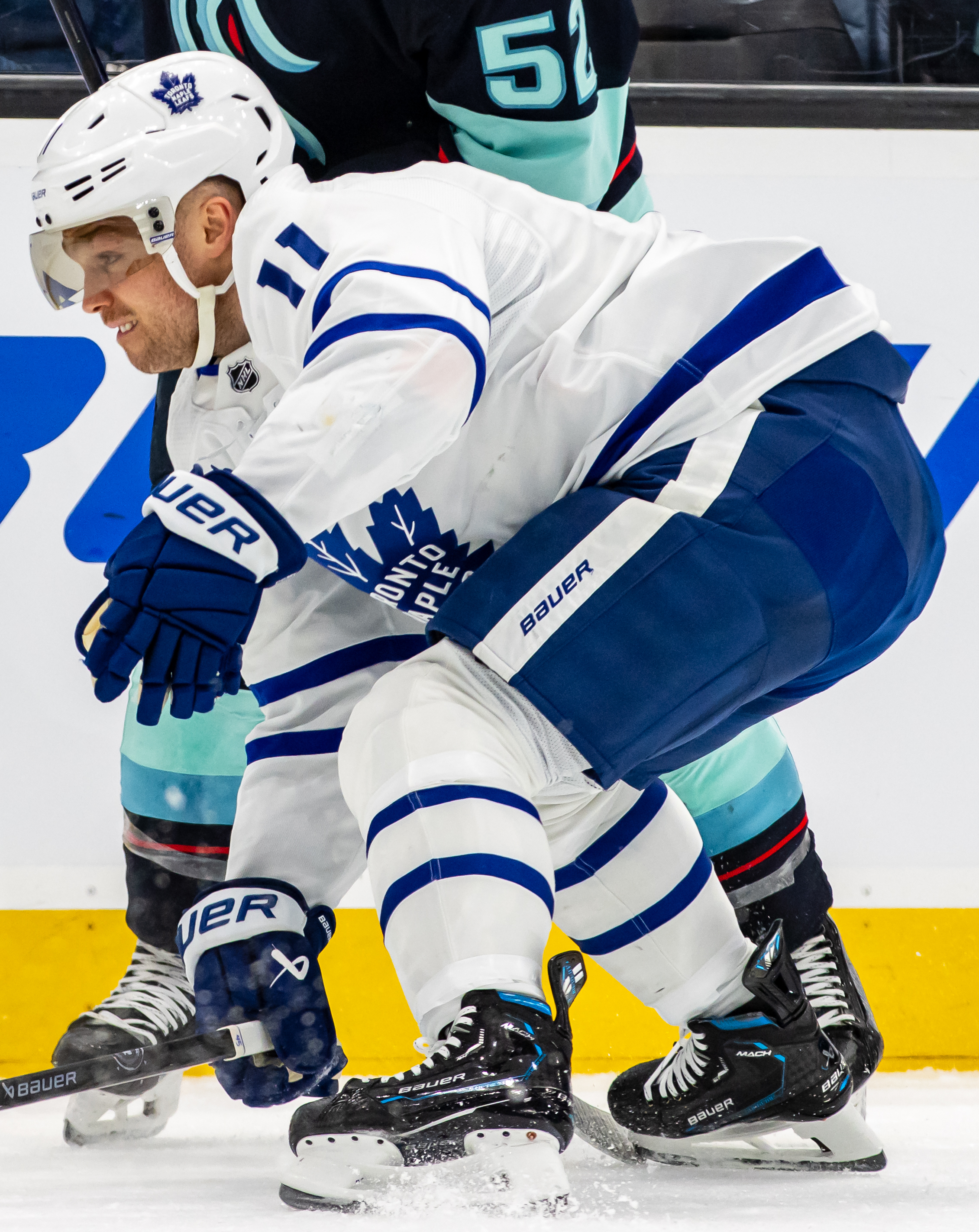
- Domi with the Toronto Maple Leafs in 2024
- Born: March 2, 1995 (age 31) Winnipeg, Manitoba, Canada
- Height: 5 ft 10 in (178 cm)
- Weight: 208 lb (94 kg; 14 st 12 lb)
- Position: Forward
- Shoots: Left
- NHL team Former teams: Toronto Maple Leafs; Arizona Coyotes; Montreal Canadiens; Columbus Blue Jackets; Carolina Hurricanes; Chicago Blackhawks; Dallas Stars
- National team: Canada
- NHL draft: 12th overall, 2013; Phoenix Coyotes
- Playing career: 2015–present

Maxwell Johannes Domi (born March 2, 1995) is a Canadian professional ice hockey player who is a forward for the Toronto Maple Leafs of the National Hockey League (NHL). He was selected in the first round, 12th overall, by the Phoenix Coyotes in the 2013 NHL entry draft. Domi has also previously played for the Montreal Canadiens, Columbus Blue Jackets, Carolina Hurricanes, Chicago Blackhawks, and Dallas Stars.

== Playing career ==
=== Amateur ===
He was selected by the Kingston Frontenacs with the eighth pick of the 2011 Ontario Hockey League (OHL) draft, but was subsequently traded for three second-round draft picks to the London Knights. In his OHL debut against the Saginaw Spirit, on September 23, 2011, Domi scored a hat trick and recorded an assist to lead the Knights in an 8–0 victory. During the 2011–12 season, he won a bronze medal with Team Ontario at the 2012 World U-17 Hockey Challenge, and helped the Knights capture the 2012 OHL Championship. Domi was rated as a top prospect who fulfilled the expectation to be a first round selection at the 2013 NHL entry draft.

During the 2012–13 season, Domi played with Team Canada to win a gold medal at the 2012 Ivan Hlinka Memorial Tournament, was an invited participant at the 2013 CHL Top Prospects Game and led his London Knights team to capture their second consecutive OHL Championship. He was also a part of the Canadian team that won gold at the 2015 World Junior Ice Hockey Championship, being named the tournament's Best Forward, and was selected for the tournament's All-Star Team.

=== Professional ===
==== Arizona Coyotes (2015–2018) ====
At the 2013 NHL Entry Draft, Domi was selected 12th overall by the Phoenix Coyotes. His father, Tie, had previously played for the franchise when it was known as the Winnipeg Jets (the team would move to Phoenix in 1996). On July 14, 2013, Domi signed a three-year, entry-level contract with Phoenix.

Coyotes' general manager Don Maloney confirmed fan speculation by saying he acquired prospect Anthony Duclair from the New York Rangers in the hopes he would develop line chemistry with Domi. This was due to the fact that during the 2015 World Junior Ice Hockey Championship both Duclair and Domi showed visible chemistry and were key components in leading team Canada to gold.

In his first NHL season, Domi developed instant line chemistry with Duclair, earning the duo the nickname "The Killer D's". Domi scored his first career assist and goal in his NHL debut against the Los Angeles Kings on October 9, 2015, against Jonathan Quick. On January 12, 2016, Domi recorded his first career NHL hat trick against the Edmonton Oilers. Two of his goals came on the power play, and defenceman Oliver Ekman-Larsson assisted on all three goals.

==== Montreal Canadiens (2018–2020) ====
On June 15, 2018, Domi was traded to the Montreal Canadiens in exchange for Alex Galchenyuk. The following day, Domi signed a two-year, $6.3 million contract extension with Montreal. In a preseason game against the Florida Panthers on September 19, Domi sucker punched Panthers defenceman Aaron Ekblad, resulting in Domi's suspension for the remainder of the preseason.

On October 3, 2018, Domi recorded two assists in the season opener as the Canadiens lost 3–2 in overtime to the Toronto Maple Leafs. On October 17, Domi scored his first goal for Montreal in a 3–2 victory over the St. Louis Blues. He ended the 2018–19 season with 72 points while spending the bulk of the season on the teams second line with Andrew Shaw and Tomáš Tatar. His 72 points made him the first player since Tomáš Plekanec in 2009–10 to score 70 points or more in a single season for the Canadiens.

==== Columbus Blue Jackets (2020–2022) ====
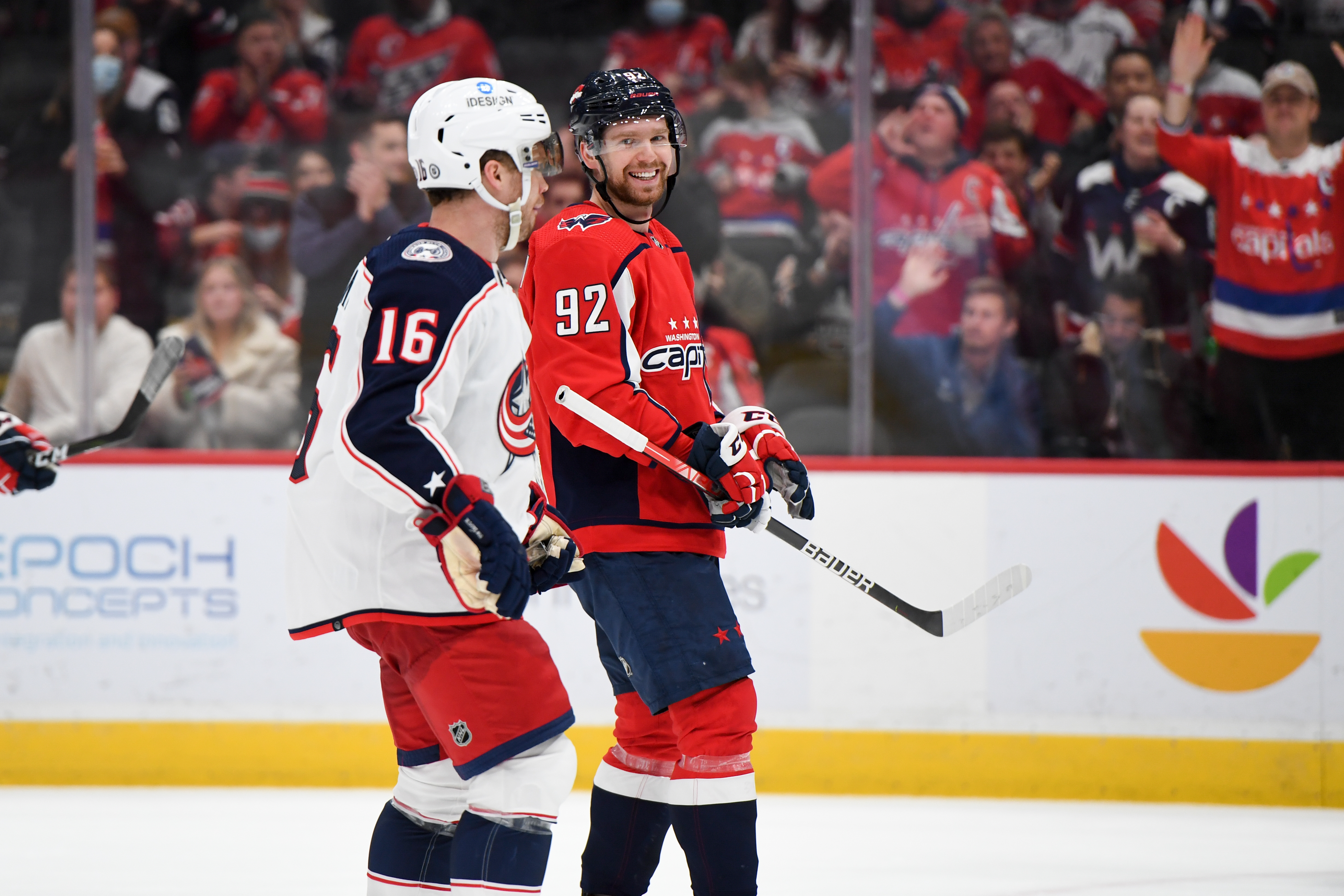
Domi during a game against the Washington Capitals.

As a restricted free agent, Domi and a third-round pick in the 2020 NHL entry draft were traded by Montreal to the Columbus Blue Jackets in exchange for forward Josh Anderson on October 6, 2020. On October 7, Domi signed a two-year, $10.6 million contract with the Blue Jackets.

==== Carolina Hurricanes (2022) ====
While in his final season under contract with the Blue Jackets, Domi was dealt by the Blue Jackets at the NHL trade deadline to the Carolina Hurricanes via the Florida Panthers in a three team trade on March 21, 2022. After posting two goals and five assists in nineteen regular season games with the Hurricanes, the team advanced into the 2022 Stanley Cup playoffs for a first round matchup with the Boston Bruins. Domi distinguished himself in Game 7, scoring two goals and recording a primary assist on a third in the team's 3–2 series-clinching victory over the Bruins. Many commentators called it the finest game of Domi's career to that point.

==== Chicago Blackhawks (2022–2023) ====
On July 13, 2022, Domi was signed to a one-year, $3 million contract with the Chicago Blackhawks.

==== Dallas Stars (2023) ====
On March 2, 2023, Domi’s 28th birthday, the Blackhawks traded the forward along with Dylan Wells to the Dallas Stars in exchange for Anton Khudobin and a second-round pick in the 2025 NHL Entry Draft.

==== Toronto Maple Leafs (2023–present) ====
As a free agent from the Stars, Domi agreed to a one-year, $3 million contract with the Toronto Maple Leafs on July 2, 2023. After putting up 9 goals and 38 assists in 2023–24, Domi signed a 4 year, $15 million extension with the Maple Leafs on June 30, 2024.

== Personal life ==
Domi was born in Winnipeg, Manitoba, when his father Tie Domi was a member of the original Winnipeg Jets franchise. Domi grew up in Toronto with his mother Leanne Domi and his sisters Carlin and Avery, as his father was traded to the Toronto Maple Leafs in April 1995, a month after he was born. Growing up, Domi's favourite team was the Maple Leafs, partially due to his father's many seasons with the club. Domi is of Albanian descent—his paternal grandparents immigrated to Canada during wars and tumult in Albania.

Domi has Type 1 Diabetes which was diagnosed at age 12 following a hockey tournament in Detroit. He regulates his blood sugar levels using an insulin pump attached to his hip. Domi wore the number 16 during his time in Arizona in homage to Bobby Clarke, a famed hockey player who also suffered with the condition. He switched to number 13 after a trade to Montreal due to 16 being retired, as well as to pay tribute to his godfather, Mats Sundin.

In 2019, Domi and author Jim Lang published a book, No Days Off: My Life with Type 1 Diabetes and Journey to the NHL.

Domi co-hosts the podcast In Range with research scientist Andrew Koutnik, in which they discuss living with Type 1 diabetes, health, and performance from both personal and scientific perspectives.

== International play ==
Medal record

Representing Canada Ontario

Ice hockey

World U-17 Hockey Challenge
Bronze medal – third place	2012 Windsor	

Representing Canada

Ivan Hlinka Memorial Tournament
Gold medal – first place	2012 Piešťany	

IIHF World Junior Championship
Gold medal – first place	2015 Canada	

Ice Hockey World Championships
Gold medal – first place	2016 Russia	

Domi represented Team Canada at the 2015 World Junior Ice Hockey Championships, winning gold. Domi later made his senior national debut with Canada at the 2016 World Championship, winning gold.

== Career statistics ==
=== Regular season and playoffs ===
			Regular season					Playoffs
Season	Team	League	GP	G	A	Pts	PIM	GP	G	A	Pts	PIM
2010–11	Don Mills Flyers	GTHL	30	27	30	57	45	—	—	—	—	—
2010–11	St. Michael's Buzzers	OJHL	2	1	1	2	0	—	—	—	—	—
2011–12	London Knights	OHL	62	21	28	49	48	19	4	5	9	10
2012–13	London Knights	OHL	64	39	48	87	71	21	11	21	32	26
2013–14	London Knights	OHL	61	34	59	93	90	9	4	6	10	8
2014–15	London Knights	OHL	57	32	70	102	66	9	5	4	9	16
2015–16	Arizona Coyotes	NHL	81	18	34	52	72	—	—	—	—	—
2016–17	Arizona Coyotes	NHL	59	9	29	38	40	—	—	—	—	—
2017–18	Arizona Coyotes	NHL	82	9	36	45	73	—	—	—	—	—
2018–19	Montreal Canadiens	NHL	82	28	44	72	80	—	—	—	—	—
2019–20	Montreal Canadiens	NHL	71	17	27	44	35	10	0	3	3	8
2020–21	Columbus Blue Jackets	NHL	54	9	15	24	75	—	—	—	—	—
2021–22	Columbus Blue Jackets	NHL	53	9	23	32	37	—	—	—	—	—
2021–22	Carolina Hurricanes	NHL	19	2	5	7	18	14	3	3	6	4
2022–23	Chicago Blackhawks	NHL	60	18	31	49	76	—	—	—	—	—
2022–23	Dallas Stars	NHL	20	2	5	7	6	19	3	10	13	52
2023–24	Toronto Maple Leafs	NHL	80	9	38	47	118	7	1	3	4	6
2024–25	Toronto Maple Leafs	NHL	74	8	25	33	76	13	3	4	7	33
2025–26	Toronto Maple Leafs	NHL	80	12	24	36	95	—	—	—	—	—
NHL totals			815	150	336	486	801	63	10	23	33	103

=== International ===
Year	Team	Event	Results	GP	G	A	Pts	PIM
2012	Canada Ontario	U17	3rd place, bronze medalist(s)	6	3	4	7	14
2012	Canada	IH18	1st place, gold medalist(s)	5	3	4	7	2
2015	Canada	WJC	1st place, gold medalist(s)	7	5	5	10	4
2016	Canada	WC	1st place, gold medalist(s)	10	1	0	1	4
Junior totals				18	11	13	24	20
Senior totals				10	1	0	1	4

== Awards and honours ==
Awards	Year
CHL Top Prospects Game	2013
World Junior Ice Hockey Championship Best Forward	2015

Awards and achievements
Preceded by Henrik Samuelsson	Phoenix Coyotes first-round draft pick 2013	Succeeded by Brendan Perlini
