= Rasmus Fyrpihl =

Swedish ice hockey player

- Born: 12 April 1995 (age 30) Örebro, Sweden
- Height: 6 ft 0 in (183 cm)
- Weight: 198 lb (90 kg; 14 st 2 lb)
- Position: Left wing
- Shot: Left
- Played for: Örebro HK
- Playing career: 2012–2017

Rasmus Fyrpihl (born 12 April 1995) is a Swedish former professional ice hockey player. He played with hometown club Örebro HK in the Swedish Hockey League (SHL).

Fyrpihl made his Swedish Hockey League debut playing with Örebro HK during the 2014–15 SHL season.
