= Johannes Fischer =

German physicist

Johannes Fischer (born 1887) was a German physicist.

== Education ==
Fischer studied under Arnold Sommerfeld at the Ludwig-Maximilians-Universität München. His thesis was on the theory of diffraction, and he was awarded his doctorate in 1922.

== Books ==
- Johannes Fischer Einführung in die klassische Elektrodynamik (Berlin: Springer, 1936)
- Johannes Fischer Größen und Einheiten der Elektrizitätslehre (Berlin: Springer-Verlag, 1961)
- Johannes Fischer Elektrodynamik. Ein Lehrbuch (Springer-Verlag, 1976)
