= Ivan Fischenko =

Russian professional ice hockey player

- Born: 19 July 1995 (age 30) Tyumen, Russia
- Height: 6 ft 2 in (188 cm)
- Weight: 201 lb (91 kg; 14 st 5 lb)
- Position: Forward
- Shoots: Left
- KHL team Former teams: Free Agent; Avangard Omsk; Admiral Vladivostok
- Playing career: 2015–present

Ivan Fischenko (born 19 July 1995) is a Russian professional ice hockey player. He is currently an unrestricted free agent who most recently played with Admiral Vladivostok of the Kontinental Hockey League (KHL).

On 28 February 2015, Fischenko made his Kontinental Hockey League debut playing with Avangard Omsk during the 2014–15 KHL season.
