= Leon Bristedt =

Swedish professional ice hockey forward

- Born: 14 March 1995 (age 30); Stockholm, Sweden
- Height: 173 cm (5 ft 8 in)
- Weight: 86 kg (190 lb; 13 st 8 lb)
- Position: Centre/Left wing
- Shoots: Left
- SHL team Former teams: Rögle BK; HC Davos
- NHL draft: Undrafted
- Playing career: 2018–present

Leon Bristedt (born 14 March 1995) is a Swedish professional ice hockey forward. He is currently playing with Rögle BK in the Swedish Hockey League (SHL).

Bristedt spent four years at the University of Minnesota in the Big Ten Conference before returning to Sweden and signing with Rögle BK of the SHL in 2018. Bristedt has also played two seasons in the Swiss National League (NL) with HC Davos.
