= Anton Blomberg =

Swedish ice hockey player

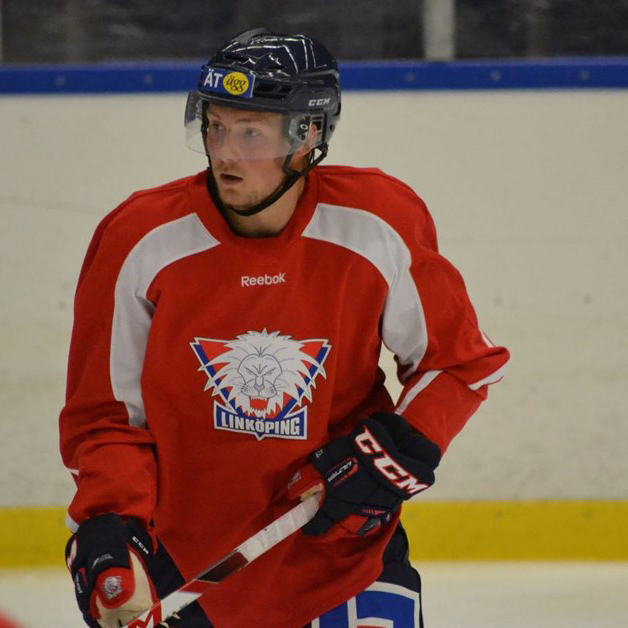
- Blomberg in 2015
- Born: June 17, 1995 (age 30) Motala, Sweden
- Height: 5 ft 11 in (180 cm)
- Weight: 176 lb (80 kg; 12 st 8 lb)
- Position: Right wing
- Shoots: Right
- SHL team: Linköpings HC
- NHL draft: Undrafted
- Playing career: 2014–present

Anton Blomberg (born June 17, 1995) is a Swedish ice hockey player. He is currently playing with Linköpings HC of the Swedish Hockey League (SHL).

Blomberg made his Swedish Hockey League debut playing with Linköpings HC during the 2013–14 SHL playoffs.
