= Adam Zbořil =

Czech ice hockey forward

- Born: August 28, 1995 (age 30) Brno, Czech Republic
- Height: 5 ft 7 in (170 cm)
- Weight: 185 lb (84 kg; 13 st 3 lb)
- Position: Forward
- Shoots: Left
- ELH team Former teams: BK Mladá Boleslav; SaiPa; HC Nové Zámky
- Playing career: 2016–present

Adam Zbořil (born August 28, 1995) is a Czech professional ice hockey forward currently playing for BK Mladá Boleslav of the Czech Extraliga. He is the older brother of Jakub Zbořil.

Zbořil began playing for HC Kometa Brno's various junior teams before spending one season in the Quebec Major Junior Hockey League in the 2012–13 season with Acadie–Bathurst Titan. He then joined SaiPa in 2013 and played one game in Liiga for them during the 2015-16 season.
