= Victor Öhman (ice hockey, born 1995) =

Swedish ice hockey player

- Born: July 1, 1995 (age 29); Örnsköldsvik, Sweden
- Height: 5 ft 9 in (175 cm)
- Weight: 174 lb (79 kg; 12 st 6 lb)
- Position: Forward
- Shoots: Left
- GET team Former teams: Sparta Warriors; Modo Hockey; IK Oskarshamn; Västerviks IK; IF Björklöven
- NHL draft: Undrafted
- Playing career: 2013–present

Victor Öhman (born July 1, 1995) is a Swedish ice hockey player. He plays with Sparta Warriors of the GET-ligaen (GET).

Öhman made his Swedish Hockey League debut playing with Modo Hockey during the 2012–13 SHL season.
