= 2012 Ivan Hlinka Memorial Tournament =

Tournament details
- Host countries: Slovakia; Czech Republic
- Venue(s): 2 (in 2 host cities)
- Dates: August 13–18, 2012
- Teams: 8

Final positions
- Champions: Canada
- Runner-up: Finland
- Third place: Sweden
- Fourth place: Czech Republic

Tournament statistics
- Games played: 18
- Goals scored: 129 (7.17 per game)
- Scoring leader(s): (Canada) Nathan MacKinnon (5 goals, 6 assists)

The 2012 Ivan Hlinka Memorial Tournament was an under-18 ice hockey tournament held in Břeclav, Czech Republic, and Piešťany, Slovakia, on August 13–18, 2012. As in the previous two years, the venues were Alcaplast Arena in Břeclav and Patrícia Ice Arena 37 in Piešťany.

== Preliminary round ==
=== Group A ===
Team	Pld	W	OTW	OTL	L	GF	GA	GD	Pts
Finland	3	2	0	0	1	11	13	−2	6
Czech Republic	3	2	0	0	1	9	6	+3	6
Russia	3	1	1	0	1	10	5	+5	5
United States	3	0	0	1	2	9	15	−6	1

=== Group B ===
Team	Pld	W	OTW	OTL	L	GF	GA	GD	Pts
Canada	3	3	0	0	0	14	8	+6	9
Sweden	3	2	0	0	1	20	14	+6	6
Switzerland	3	1	0	0	2	9	12	−3	3
Slovakia	3	0	0	0	3	5	14	−9	0

== Final round ==
=== Seventh place game ===
August 17, 2012	Slovakia	3–5	United States	Patrícia Ice Arena 37

=== Fifth place game ===
August 17, 2012	Russia	7–5	Switzerland	Alcaplast Arena

=== Semifinal 1 ===
August 17, 2012	Finland	5–4 (OT) (2–1, 0–3, 2–0, 1–0)	Sweden	Patrícia Ice Arena 37

=== Semifinal 2 ===
August 17, 2012	Canada	5–2 (1–1, 2–0, 2–1)	Czech Republic	Alcaplast Arena

=== Bronze medal game ===
August 18, 2012	Sweden	2–1 (0–0, 1–1, 1–0)	Czech Republic	Alcaplast Arena

Lucas Wallmark (Gunnarsson, Krupic)	1–0
	1–1	Petr Ceslik (Pokorny)
Andre Burakowsky (Crus Rydberg)	2–1

=== Gold medal game ===
August 18, 2012	Canada	4–0 (0–0, 3–0, 1–0)	Finland	Patrícia Ice Arena 37

Game reference

Zachary Fucale
Goalies
Ville Husso

Nathan MacKinnon (Drouin)	1–0
Nathan MacKinnon (Ritchie)	2–0
Curtis Lazar (Horvat, Domi)	3–0
Nathan MacKinnon (Morrissey, Drouin)	4–0

=== Final standings ===
Rk.	Team
1st place, gold medalist(s)	Canada
2nd place, silver medalist(s)	Finland
3rd place, bronze medalist(s)	Sweden
4.	Czech Republic
5.	Russia
6.	Switzerland
7.	United States
8.	Slovakia

== See also ==
- 2012 IIHF World U18 Championships
- 2012 World Junior Championships

Preceded by 2011 Ivan Hlinka Memorial Tournament	Ivan Hlinka Memorial Tournament; 2012	Succeeded by 2013 Ivan Hlinka Memorial Tournament
