= 2016 Stanley Cup playoffs =

Playoff tournament of the NHL

Tournament details
- Dates: April 13–June 12, 2016
- Teams: 16
- Defending champions: Chicago Blackhawks

Final positions
- Champions: Pittsburgh Penguins
- Runners-up: San Jose Sharks

Tournament statistics
- Scoring leader(s): Logan Couture (Sharks) (30 points)

Awards
- MVP: Sidney Crosby (Penguins)

The 2016 Stanley Cup playoffs was the playoff tournament of the National Hockey League (NHL) for the 2015–16 season. They began on April 13, 2016, and ended on June 12, 2016, with the Pittsburgh Penguins winning the cup by defeating the San Jose Sharks four games to two, for their fourth Stanley Cup in franchise history.

For only the second time in league history (1970 being the only other time), none of the NHL's seven Canadian-based teams qualified for the postseason. In addition, for the second season in a row and only the fifth (and most recent) time since joining the league in 1979, all four former WHA teams (the Edmonton Oilers, Arizona Coyotes, Carolina Hurricanes and Colorado Avalanche) missed the playoffs. The Washington Capitals made the playoffs as the Presidents' Trophy winners with the most points (i.e. best record) during the regular season. This was the final season of the Detroit Red Wings' 25-season playoff appearance streak, the longest streak at the time and tied for third longest in NHL history. The Florida Panthers qualified for the playoffs for only the second time since the 1999–2000 season—both times winning their division—and fifth time in franchise history. For the fourth time in six years, all three California-based teams made the playoffs in the same season. And, for only the second time ever (1996 being the only other time), both Florida-based teams made the playoffs in the same season.

For the first time since 2006, and only the third time in league history, all Original Six teams who made the playoffs (three in total) were eliminated in the first round. The New York Islanders won their first post-season series since the 1993 Stanley Cup playoffs, ending the third longest post-season win drought in NHL history. For the seventh consecutive season and eleventh out of thirteen seasons, a team from California was in the Western Conference final.

For the first time since 2002, no team lost in a four-game sweep in a playoff series.

== Playoff seeds ==
This was the third year in which the top three teams in each division make the playoffs, along with two wild cards in each conference (for a total of eight playoff teams from each conference).

The following teams qualified for the playoffs:

=== Eastern Conference ===
==== Atlantic Division ====
1. Florida Panthers, Atlantic Division champions – 103 points
2. Tampa Bay Lightning – 97 points
3. Detroit Red Wings – 93 points

==== Metropolitan Division ====
1. Washington Capitals, Metropolitan Division champions, Eastern Conference regular season champions, Presidents' Trophy winners – 120 points
2. Pittsburgh Penguins – 104 points
3. New York Rangers – 101 points

==== Wild cards ====
1. New York Islanders – 100 points
2. Philadelphia Flyers – 96 points

=== Western Conference ===
==== Central Division ====
1. Dallas Stars, Central Division champions, Western Conference regular season champions – 109 points
2. St. Louis Blues – 107 points
3. Chicago Blackhawks – 103 points

==== Pacific Division ====
1. Anaheim Ducks, Pacific Division champions – 103 points
2. Los Angeles Kings – 102 points
3. San Jose Sharks – 98 points

==== Wild cards ====
1. Nashville Predators – 96 points
2. Minnesota Wild – 87 points

== Playoff bracket ==
In each round, teams competed in a best-of-seven series following a 2–2–1–1–1 format (scores in the bracket indicate the number of games won in each best-of-seven series). The team with home ice advantage played at home for games one and two (and games five and seven, if necessary), and the other team was at home for games three and four (and game six, if necessary). The top three teams in each division made the playoffs, along with two wild cards in each conference, for a total of eight teams from each conference. The Wild Card seeded in the Western Conference were previously Central 1 vs Wild Card 1 and Pacific 1 vs Wild Card 2 in the 2014 and 2015 playoffs. In the 2016 playoffs the Wild Card seeded in the Western Conference swapped places Central 1 vs Wild Card 2 and Pacific 1 vs Wild Card 1, while the Eastern Conference Wild Card seeded remain to the same Atlantic 1 vs Wild Card 1 and Metropolitan 1 vs Wild Card 2.

In the first round, the lower seeded wild card in the conference played against the division winner with the best record while the other wild card played against the other division winner, and both wild cards were de facto #4 seeds. The other series matched the second and third place teams from the divisions. In the first two rounds, home ice advantage was awarded to the team with the better seed; in the last two rounds, it was awarded to the team that had the better regular season record.

First round	Second round
A1	Florida	2
WC1	NY Islanders	4
WC1	NY Islanders	1
A2	Tampa Bay	4
A2	Tampa Bay	4
A3	Detroit	1
Eastern Conference
M1	Washington	4
WC2	Philadelphia	2
M1	Washington	2
M2	Pittsburgh	4
M2	Pittsburgh	4
M3	NY Rangers	1
C1	Dallas	4
WC2	Minnesota	2
C1	Dallas	3
C2	St. Louis	4
C2	St. Louis	4
C3	Chicago	3
Western Conference
P1	Anaheim	3
WC1	Nashville	4
WC1	Nashville	3
P3	San Jose	4
P2	Los Angeles	1
P3	San Jose	4

Conference finals
A2	Tampa Bay	3
M2	Pittsburgh	4
C2	St. Louis	2
P3	San Jose	4

Stanley Cup Finals
M2	Pittsburgh	4
P3	San Jose	2

Legend

- A1, A2, A3 – The first, second, and third place teams from the Atlantic Division, respectively
- M1, M2, M3 – The first, second, and third place teams from the Metropolitan Division, respectively
- C1, C2, C3 – The first, second, and third place teams from the Central Division, respectively
- P1, P2, P3 – The first, second, and third place teams from the Pacific Division, respectively
- WC1, WC2 – The first and second place teams in the Wild Card, respectively

== First round ==
=== Eastern Conference first round ===
==== (A1) Florida Panthers vs. (WC1) New York Islanders ====
The Florida Panthers finished first in the Atlantic Division, earning 103 points. The New York Islanders finished as the Eastern Conference's first wild-card, earning 100 points. This was the first meeting between these two teams. Florida won two of the three games of the regular season series. This was the first time that a Stanley Cup playoff series was played at the Barclays Center. The series contained the two teams with the longest playoff win drought in the league (the Islanders had not won a series since 1993, and the Panthers since 1996). The team that both clubs defeated for their last respective playoff series victory were the Pittsburgh Penguins, of which Panthers' right winger Jaromir Jagr was a member.

The Islanders defeated the Panthers in six games and won a playoff series for the first time since 1993. John Tavares scored a goal and two assists for the Islanders in a 5–4 win in game one. In game two, Roberto Luongo recorded 41 saves in a 3–1 win to help the Panthers tie the series. The Islanders came back from a two-goal deficit in the second period to win game three in overtime on Thomas Hickey's wrist shot. In game four, Jaromir Jagr had an assist to reach 200 points overall in the playoffs. The Panthers won the game 2–1. Games five and six both ended in double-overtime with identical scores of 2–1 and New York winning both games. In game five, Alan Quine scored the game-winner on a power play 16:00 into the second overtime. Thomas Greiss made 47 saves in the victory. In game six, Tavares scored the first New York goal with 54 seconds left in the third period to send the game into overtime. In the second overtime, Tavares scored his second goal and the series winner.

April 14	New York Islanders	5–4	Florida Panthers	BB&T Center	Recap
Brock Nelson (1) – 06:39; Frans Nielsen (1) – pp – 16:46		First period	01:55 – Teddy Purcell (1); 13:51 – pp – Jussi Jokinen (1)
John Tavares (1) – 19:38		Second period	01:31 – Reilly Smith (1)
Kyle Okposo (1) – 02:33; Ryan Strome (1) – 06:01		Third period	06:56 – Reilly Smith (2)
Thomas Greiss 42 saves / 46 shots		Goalie stats	Roberto Luongo 21 saves / 26 shots

April 15	New York Islanders	1–3	Florida Panthers	BB&T Center	Recap
No scoring		First period	04:32 – Reilly Smith (3)
No scoring		Second period	06:17 – Nick Bjugstad (1)
John Tavares (2) – 16:27		Third period	19:50 – en – Dmitry Kulikov (1)
Thomas Greiss 28 saves / 30 shots		Goalie stats	Roberto Luongo 41 saves / 42 shots

April 17	Florida Panthers	3–4	OT	New York Islanders	Barclays Center	Recap
Reilly Smith (4) – 02:25		First period		No scoring
Aleksander Barkov (1) – 01:11; Nick Bjugstad (2) – 07:23		Second period		05:21 – pp – Ryan Pulock (1); 11:48 – Shane Prince (1); 16:55 – pp – Frans Nielsen (2)
No scoring		Third period		No scoring
No scoring		First overtime period		12:31 – Thomas Hickey (1)
Roberto Luongo 35 saves / 39 shots		Goalie stats		Thomas Greiss 36 saves / 39 shots

April 20	Florida Panthers	2–1	New York Islanders	Barclays Center	Recap
No scoring		First period	No scoring
Teddy Purcell (2) – pp – 15:18		Second period	19:44 – pp – John Tavares (3)
Alex Petrovic (1) – 09:25		Third period	No scoring
Roberto Luongo 26 saves / 27 shots		Goalie stats	Thomas Greiss 27 saves / 29 shots

April 22	New York Islanders	2–1	2OT	Florida Panthers	BB&T Center	Recap
Frans Nielsen (3) – 13:31		First period		No scoring
No scoring		Second period		No scoring
No scoring		Third period		01:59 – Aleksander Barkov (2)
Alan Quine (1) – pp – 16:00		Second overtime period		No scoring
Thomas Greiss 47 saves / 48 shots		Goalie stats		Roberto Luongo 40 saves / 42 shots

April 24	Florida Panthers	1–2	2OT	New York Islanders	Barclays Center	Recap
Jonathan Huberdeau (1) – 18:58		First period		No scoring
No scoring		Second period		No scoring
No scoring		Third period		19:06 – John Tavares (4)
No scoring		Second overtime period		10:41 – John Tavares (5)
Roberto Luongo 49 saves / 51 shots		Goalie stats		Thomas Greiss 41 saves / 42 shots

New York won series 4–2

==== (A2) Tampa Bay Lightning vs. (A3) Detroit Red Wings ====
The Tampa Bay Lightning finished second in the Atlantic Division, earning 97 points. The Detroit Red Wings earned 93 points to finish third in the Atlantic. This was the second meeting between these teams; their only previous meeting was in last year's Eastern Conference First Round which Tampa Bay won in seven games. The teams split their four-game regular season series this year.

The Lightning defeated the Red Wings in five games. Lightning forward Nikita Kucherov scored twice and goalie Ben Bishop made 34 saves in a 3–2 win in Game 1. Tyler Johnson recorded two goals in Game 2 in a 5–2 win for the Lightning. In Game 3, Detroit goalie Jimmy Howard was replaced with Petr Mrazek, who stopped all 16 shots in a 2–0 win. In Game 4, Kucherov had two goals and an assist and Jonathan Drouin assisted on all three goals scored by Tampa Bay in a 3–2 win. In the final game of the series, Alex Killorn scored with 1:43 left in the third period to give the Lightning a 1–0 lead and the series win.

Games 3 and 4 were the last playoff games ever played at Joe Louis Arena. The arena closed after the 2016-17 as the Red Wings moved into Little Caesars Arena. This was the last of 25 consecutive playoff appearances by the Red Wings, and is to date the last time in which they made the playoffs.

April 13	Detroit Red Wings	2–3	Tampa Bay Lightning	Amalie Arena	Recap
No scoring		First period	06:23 – Nikita Kucherov (1)
Mike Green (1) – 02:11; Justin Abdelkader (1) – 04:07		Second period	09:29 – Nikita Kucherov (2)
No scoring		Third period	08:52 – Alex Killorn (1)
Jimmy Howard 31 saves / 34 shots		Goalie stats	Ben Bishop 34 saves / 36 shots

April 15	Detroit Red Wings	2–5	Tampa Bay Lightning	Amalie Arena	Recap
No scoring		First period	15:17 – pp – Nikita Kucherov (3)
Dylan Larkin (1) – 03:30		Second period	06:46 – Brian Boyle (1)
Brad Richards (1) – pp – 04:27		Third period	06:32 – Tyler Johnson (1); 14:48 – Tyler Johnson (2); 17:16 – en – Alex Killorn (2)
Jimmy Howard 26 saves / 30 shots		Goalie stats	Ben Bishop 30 saves / 32 shots

April 17	Tampa Bay Lightning	0–2	Detroit Red Wings	Joe Louis Arena	Recap
No scoring		First period	No scoring
No scoring		Second period	12:42 – Andreas Athanasiou (1); 17:22 – Henrik Zetterberg (1)
No scoring		Third period	No scoring
Ben Bishop 28 saves / 30 shots		Goalie stats	Petr Mrazek 16 saves / 16 shots

April 19	Tampa Bay Lightning	3–2	Detroit Red Wings	Joe Louis Arena	Recap
Nikita Kucherov (4) – pp – 05:41		First period	No scoring
Nikita Kucherov (5) – pp – 10:31		Second period	14:53 – Darren Helm (1); 19:50 – Gustav Nyquist (1)
Ondrej Palat (1) – pp – 17:01		Third period	No scoring
Ben Bishop 26 saves / 28 shots		Goalie stats	Petr Mrazek 30 saves / 33 shots

April 21	Detroit Red Wings	0–1	Tampa Bay Lightning	Amalie Arena	Recap
No scoring		First period	No scoring
No scoring		Second period	No scoring
No scoring		Third period	18:17 – Alex Killorn (3)
Petr Mrazek 23 saves / 24 shots		Goalie stats	Ben Bishop 34 saves / 34 shots

Tampa Bay won series 4–1

==== (M1) Washington Capitals vs. (WC2) Philadelphia Flyers ====
The Washington Capitals earned the Presidents' Trophy as the NHL's best regular season team with 120 points. The Philadelphia Flyers finished as the Eastern Conference's second wild-card, earning 96 points. This was the fifth meeting between these teams; with both teams splitting the four previous series. They last met in the 2008 Eastern Conference quarterfinals, which Philadelphia won in seven games. These teams split the four-game regular season series.

The Capitals defeated the Flyers in six games. Capitals goalie Braden Holtby shut out the Flyers in game one, stopping all 19 shots he faced in a 2–0 win. In game two, Holtby made 41 saves and a fluke goal by Capitals forward Jason Chimera turned to be the game-winning goal in a 4–1 win. The Capitals scored a franchise record five power play goals to rout the Flyers 6–1 in game three. In game four, Philadelphia avoided elimination by switching goaltender Steve Mason, who gave up six goals in the previous game, to Michal Neuvirth who made 31 saves in a 2–1 win. The Flyers forced a sixth game after Neuvirth made 44 saves in a 2–0 win in game five; the Flyers had 11 shots in a playoff win, the fewest ever in franchise history. Nicklas Backstrom scored the only goal for the Capitals in game six for his team to move onto the second round.

April 14	Philadelphia Flyers	0–2	Washington Capitals	Verizon Center	Recap
No scoring		First period	No scoring
No scoring		Second period	16:21 – pp – John Carlson (1)
No scoring		Third period	16:36 – Jay Beagle (1)
Steve Mason 29 saves / 31 shots		Goalie stats	Braden Holtby 19 saves / 19 shots

April 16	Philadelphia Flyers	1–4	Washington Capitals	Verizon Center	Recap
No scoring		First period	14:09 – pp – John Carlson (2)
Jakub Voracek (1) – 09:37		Second period	02:26 – Jason Chimera (1); 17:21 – pp – Alexander Ovechkin (1)
No scoring		Third period	17:47 – Nicklas Backstrom (1)
Steve Mason 19 saves / 23 shots		Goalie stats	Braden Holtby 41 saves / 42 shots

April 18	Washington Capitals	6–1	Philadelphia Flyers	Wells Fargo Center	Recap
Marcus Johansson (1) – pp – 04:43		First period	00:57 – Michael Raffl (1)
Alexander Ovechkin (2) – 08:50		Second period	No scoring
Evgeny Kuznetsov (1) – pp – 01:58; John Carlson (3) – pp – 07:37; Alexander Ovechkin (3) – pp – 14:58; Jay Beagle (2) – pp – 18:20		Third period	No scoring
Braden Holtby 31 saves / 32 shots		Goalie stats	Steve Mason 21 saves / 27 shots

April 20	Washington Capitals	1–2	Philadelphia Flyers	Wells Fargo Center	Recap
No scoring		First period	05:51 – pp – Shayne Gostisbehere (1)
No scoring		Second period	03:51 – Andrew MacDonald (1)
T. J. Oshie (1) – 02:38		Third period	No scoring
Braden Holtby 23 saves / 25 shots		Goalie stats	Michal Neuvirth 31 saves / 32 shots

April 22	Philadelphia Flyers	2–0	Washington Capitals	Verizon Center	Recap
No scoring		First period	No scoring
Ryan White (1) – 07:52		Second period	No scoring
Chris VandeVelde (1) – en – 19:29		Third period	No scoring
Michal Neuvirth 44 saves / 44 shots		Goalie stats	Braden Holtby 9 saves / 10 shots

April 24	Washington Capitals	1–0	Philadelphia Flyers	Wells Fargo Center	Recap
No scoring		First period	No scoring
Nicklas Backstrom (2) – 08:59		Second period	No scoring
No scoring		Third period	No scoring
Braden Holtby 26 saves / 26 shots		Goalie stats	Michal Neuvirth 28 saves / 29 shots

Washington won series 4–2

==== (M2) Pittsburgh Penguins vs. (M3) New York Rangers ====
The Pittsburgh Penguins finished second in the Metropolitan Division, earning 104 points. The New York Rangers earned 101 points in the regular season to finish third in the Metropolitan. This was the seventh meeting between these teams, and the third meeting in three consecutive seasons, with Pittsburgh losing the last two but winning four of the six overall. They last met in last year's Eastern Conference First Round, which the Rangers won in five games. Pittsburgh won three of the four games of the regular season series.

The Penguins defeated the Rangers in five games. Penguins forward Patric Hornqvist scored a hat trick in a 5–2 win in game one. J. T. Miller had three assists to help the Rangers win 4–2 in game two. In game three, Pittsburgh scored three times after New York took a 1–0 lead to win 3–1. Evgeni Malkin scored two power play goals and Matt Murray made 31 saves in game four for the Penguins in a 5–0 win. In game five, after the Penguins' four-goal second period, of which Bryan Rust had two goals and an assist, Rangers head coach Alain Vigneault pulled Henrik Lundqvist, who had given up six goals on 23 shots. The Penguins ended the series with a 6–3 victory. It was the first time the Rangers were eliminated in the opening round since 2011, snapping a five-year advancement streak. This was also the first playoff series in which two goaltenders on the same team played in and subsequently won their playoff debut, with Jeff Zatkoff winning game one and Matt Murray winning game three.

April 13	New York Rangers	2–5	Pittsburgh Penguins	Consol Energy Center	Recap
No scoring		First period	19:42 – Patric Hornqvist (1)
No scoring		Second period	18:56 – Sidney Crosby (1)
Derek Stepan (1) – pp – 03:10; Derek Stepan (2) – 10:11		Third period	05:31 – sh – Tom Kuhnhackl (1); 08:02 – pp – Patric Hornqvist (2); 17:10 – en – Patric Hornqvist (3)
Henrik Lundqvist 10 saves / 11 shots Antti Raanta 16 saves / 19 shots		Goalie stats	Jeff Zatkoff 35 saves / 37 shots

April 16	New York Rangers	4–2	Pittsburgh Penguins	Consol Energy Center	Recap
No scoring		First period	No scoring
Keith Yandle (1) – 12:38; Derick Brassard (1) – 12:56; Mats Zuccarello (1) – 16:52		Second period	03:21 – pp – Phil Kessel (1)
Chris Kreider (1) – 00:39		Third period	05:42 – pp – Phil Kessel (2)
Henrik Lundqvist 29 saves / 31 shots		Goalie stats	Jeff Zatkoff 24 saves / 28 shots

April 19	Pittsburgh Penguins	3–1	New York Rangers	Madison Square Garden	Recap
No scoring		First period	No scoring
Sidney Crosby (2) – pp – 19:18		Second period	00:39 – sh – Rick Nash (1)
Matt Cullen (1) – 04:16; Kris Letang (1) – en – 19:47		Third period	No scoring
Matt Murray 16 saves / 17 shots		Goalie stats	Henrik Lundqvist 28 saves / 30 shots

April 21	Pittsburgh Penguins	5–0	New York Rangers	Madison Square Garden	Recap
Eric Fehr (1) – 01:09; Sidney Crosby (3) – pp – 07:11; Conor Sheary (1) – 16:12		First period	No scoring
Evgeni Malkin (1) – pp – 04:00		Second period	No scoring
Evgeni Malkin (2) – pp – 03:28		Third period	No scoring
Matt Murray 31 saves / 31 shots		Goalie stats	Henrik Lundqvist 14 saves / 18 shots Antti Raanta 13 saves / 14 shots

April 23	New York Rangers	3–6	Pittsburgh Penguins	Consol Energy Center	Recap
Rick Nash (2) – 01:02; Dominic Moore (1) – 10:35		First period	09:50 – Carl Hagelin (1); 11:39 – pp – Phil Kessel (3)
No scoring		Second period	05:21 – Bryan Rust (1); 09:26 – Matt Cullen (2); 16:18 – Conor Sheary (2); 19:01 – Bryan Rust (2)
Chris Kreider (2) – pp – 05:38		Third period	No scoring
Henrik Lundqvist 17 saves / 23 shots Antti Raanta 5 saves / 5 shots		Goalie stats	Matt Murray 38 saves / 41 shots

Pittsburgh won series 4–1

=== Western Conference first round ===
==== (C1) Dallas Stars vs. (WC2) Minnesota Wild ====
The Dallas Stars finished first in the Central Division, earning 109 points. The Minnesota Wild finished as the Western Conference's second wild-card, earning 87 points. This was the first meeting in the playoffs between Minnesota's current NHL franchise and its former NHL franchise (then known as the North Stars). Dallas won four of the five games of the regular season series.

The Stars defeated the Wild in six games. Jamie Benn scored a goal and two assists and goalie Kari Lehtonen made 22 saves for the Stars in game one in a 4–0 victory. Jamie Benn scored the game winner in game two in a 2–1 win for the Stars to take a 2–0 lead in the series. In game three, after Patrick Sharp scored two goals in the first period for the Stars, the Wild scored four consecutive goals to take the lead. Jason Pominville scored two of the Wild goals in a 5–3 win. Antti Niemi made 28 saves to help the Stars take a 3–1 series lead in a 3–2 win in game four. The Wild avoided elimination in game five when forward Mikko Koivu scored his second goal of the game at 4:55 of the first overtime period, in a 5–4 win. In Game six, the Stars took a four-goal lead before the Wild attempted a late comeback by scoring three goals in under five minutes during the third period. Alex Goligoski scored the eventual series-winner for Dallas halfway through the third period as the Stars hung on for a 5–4 victory.

April 14	Minnesota Wild	0–4	Dallas Stars	American Airlines Center	Recap
No scoring		First period	No scoring
No scoring		Second period	03:53 – Radek Faksa (1); 12:17 – Jason Spezza (1)
No scoring		Third period	14:16 – pp – Patrick Eaves (1); 16:00 – en – Jamie Benn (1)
Devan Dubnyk 28 saves / 31 shots		Goalie stats	Kari Lehtonen 22 saves / 22 shots

April 16	Minnesota Wild	1–2	Dallas Stars	American Airlines Center	Recap
No scoring		First period	No scoring
No scoring		Second period	03:54 – Antoine Roussel (1)
Marco Scandella (1) – pp – 12:42		Third period	10:23 – Jamie Benn (2)
Devan Dubnyk 26 saves / 28 shots		Goalie stats	Kari Lehtonen 25 saves / 26 shots

April 18	Dallas Stars	3–5	Minnesota Wild	Xcel Energy Center	Recap
Patrick Sharp (1) – 00:26; Patrick Sharp (2) – 04:10		First period	19:10 – Chris Porter (1)
No scoring		Second period	06:04 – Erik Haula (1); 19:13 – Jason Pominville (1)
Colton Sceviour (1) – 13:45		Third period	06:26 – pp – Mikko Koivu (1); 18:46 – en – Jason Pominville (2)
Kari Lehtonen 20 saves / 24 shots		Goalie stats	Devan Dubnyk 14 saves / 17 shots

April 20	Dallas Stars	3–2	Minnesota Wild	Xcel Energy Center	Recap
No scoring		First period	No scoring
Ales Hemsky (1) – pp – 09:11; Patrick Eaves (2) – pp – 13:24; Jason Spezza (2) – 18:51		Second period	05:01 – Jason Pominville (3); 10:14 – Charlie Coyle (1)
No scoring		Third period	No scoring
Antti Niemi 28 saves / 30 shots		Goalie stats	Devan Dubnyk 19 saves / 22 shots

April 22	Minnesota Wild	5–4	OT	Dallas Stars	American Airlines Center	Recap
Mikael Granlund (1) – 03:32; Jordan Schroeder (1) – 05:16		First period		17:18 – Johnny Oduya (1)
No scoring		Second period		No scoring
Nino Niederreiter (1) – 01:50; Mikko Koivu (2) – 16:51		Third period		01:00 – Jamie Benn (3); 08:28 – Jason Spezza (3); 08:56 – Alex Goligoski (1)
Mikko Koivu (3) – 04:55		First overtime period		No scoring
Devan Dubnyk 37 saves / 41 shots		Goalie stats		Antti Niemi 19 saves / 24 shots

April 24	Dallas Stars	5–4	Minnesota Wild	Xcel Energy Center	Recap
John Klingberg (1) – pp – 05:56; Jason Spezza (4) – 09:07; Patrick Sharp (3) – 18:11		First period	No scoring
Jamie Benn (4) – 19:36		Second period	No scoring
Alex Goligoski (2) – 10:28		Third period	03:48 – pp – Jared Spurgeon (1); 04:04 – Jonas Brodin (1); 08:39 – pp – Jared Spurgeon (2); 15:13 – Jason Pominville (4)
Kari Lehtonen 25 saves / 29 shots		Goalie stats	Devan Dubnyk 19 saves / 24 shots

Dallas won series 4–2

==== (C2) St. Louis Blues vs. (C3) Chicago Blackhawks ====
The St. Louis Blues finished second in the Central Division earning 107 points. The Chicago Blackhawks earned 103 points to finish third in the Central. This was the twelfth playoff meeting between these two rivals with Chicago winning eight of the eleven previous series. Their most recent meeting was the 2014 Western Conference First Round, which Chicago won in six games. St. Louis won three of the five games of the regular season series.

The Blues defeated the Blackhawks in seven games after nearly giving up a 3–1 series lead. In game one, neither team scored in regulation; David Backes scored 9:04 into the first overtime for the Blues as goalie Brian Elliott made 35 saves in the win. In game two, Patrick Kane had two assists to help the Blackhawks win 3–2. The Blues recovered in game three, as Elliot made 44 saves in a 3–2 win. Game four saw Blackhawks goalie Corey Crawford go after Blues rookie forward Robby Fabbri after the forward was bumped into the goaltender by Chicago captain Jonathan Toews. Five penalties were assessed and the Blackhawks scored on the power play that followed. Vladimir Tarasenko scored twice for the Blues as they won the game 4–3. Blackhawks forward Andrew Shaw was given a one-game suspension and a $5,000 fine after he used a homophobic slur. In game five, the Blues overcame a 3–1 deficit in the third period to send the game to overtime. In double-overtime, Patrick Kane scored the game-winner for the Blackhawks who avoided elimination with a 4–3 win. The Blackhawks came back from a 3–1 deficit in game six, scoring five unanswered goals in a 6–3 victory to force a seventh game. In game seven, the Blues took a two-goal lead in the first period before the Blackhawks tied the game on goals by Marian Hossa and Andrew Shaw. In the third period, Troy Brouwer scored the series-winner as the Blues advanced past the opening round of the playoffs for the first time since 2012 with a 3–2 win.

April 13	Chicago Blackhawks	0–1	OT	St. Louis Blues	Scottrade Center	Recap
No scoring		First period		No scoring
No scoring		Second period		No scoring
No scoring		Third period		No scoring
No scoring		First overtime period		09:04 – David Backes (1)
Corey Crawford 17 saves / 18 shots		Goalie stats		Brian Elliott 35 saves / 35 shots

April 15	Chicago Blackhawks	3–2	St. Louis Blues	Scottrade Center	Recap
No scoring		First period	No scoring
Duncan Keith (1) – 19:55		Second period	15:20 – Vladimir Tarasenko (1)
Andrew Shaw (1) – pp – 15:41; Artemi Panarin (1) – en – 18:34		Third period	19:58 – Kevin Shattenkirk (1)
Corey Crawford 29 saves / 31 shots		Goalie stats	Brian Elliott 26 saves / 28 shots

April 17	St. Louis Blues	3–2	Chicago Blackhawks	United Center	Recap
Colton Parayko (1) – pp – 12:11		First period	02:18 – pp – Brent Seabrook (1)
No scoring		Second period	01:04 – Artem Anisimov (1)
Patrik Berglund (1) – 05:15; Jaden Schwartz (1) – pp – 13:22		Third period	No scoring
Brian Elliott 44 saves / 46 shots		Goalie stats	Corey Crawford 33 saves / 36 shots

April 19	St. Louis Blues	4–3	Chicago Blackhawks	United Center	Recap
Vladimir Tarasenko (2) – 14:02		First period	No scoring
Vladimir Tarasenko (3) – pp – 17:31		Second period	09:12 – Andrew Shaw (2); 13:09 – pp – Duncan Keith (2)
Jaden Schwartz (2) – pp – 01:36; Alexander Steen (1) – 04:46		Third period	14:40 – Duncan Keith (3)
Brian Elliott 39 saves / 42 shots		Goalie stats	Corey Crawford 16 saves / 20 shots

April 21	Chicago Blackhawks	4–3	2OT	St. Louis Blues	Scottrade Center	Recap
No scoring		First period		No scoring
Marian Hossa (1) – sh – 11:32; Artem Anisimov (2) – 15:24; Artemi Panarin (2) – 19:59		Second period		12:29 – pp – Jaden Schwartz (3)
No scoring		Third period		06:57 – Robby Fabbri (1); 14:50 – David Backes (2)
Patrick Kane (1) – 03:07		Second overtime period		No scoring
Corey Crawford 43 saves / 46 shots		Goalie stats		Brian Elliott 31 saves / 35 shots

April 23	St. Louis Blues	3–6	Chicago Blackhawks	United Center	Recap
Scottie Upshall (1) – 06:18; Alex Pietrangelo (1) – 08:51; Vladimir Tarasenko (4) – 11:00		First period	03:47 – Andrew Ladd (1)
No scoring		Second period	04:13 – pp – Artem Anisimov (3); 12:21 – Trevor van Riemsdyk (1); 16:18 – Dale Weise (1)
No scoring		Third period	16:53 – pp – Andrew Shaw (3); 17:40 – en – Marian Hossa (2)
Brian Elliott 30 saves / 35 shots		Goalie stats	Corey Crawford 24 saves / 27 shots

April 25	Chicago Blackhawks	2–3	St. Louis Blues	Scottrade Center	Recap
Marian Hossa (3) – 18:30		First period	01:00 – Jori Lehtera (1); 13:43 – Colton Parayko (2)
Andrew Shaw (4) – pp – 03:20		Second period	No scoring
No scoring		Third period	08:31 – Troy Brouwer (1)
Corey Crawford 23 saves / 26 shots		Goalie stats	Brian Elliott 31 saves / 33 shots

St. Louis won series 4–3

==== (P1) Anaheim Ducks vs. (WC1) Nashville Predators ====
The Anaheim Ducks finished first in the Pacific Division, earning 103 points. The Nashville Predators finished as the Western Conference's first wild-card, earning 96 points. This was the second meeting between these teams in the playoffs; their only previous series was the 2011 Western Conference quarterfinals, which Nashville won in six games. Nashville won two of the three games of the regular season series.

For the fourth straight year, the Ducks were eliminated in a seventh game at home after having a 3–2 series lead. James Neal scored 35 seconds into game one and Pekka Rinne made 27 saves for the Predators' 3–2 win. In game two, Rinne again made 27 saves in another 3–2 win to take their first ever 2–0 series lead. Before game three, Anaheim replaced goaltender John Gibson with Frederik Andersen who stopped all 27 shots he faced in a 3–0 Ducks victory. Andersen made 30 saves in a 4–1 victory in game four to tie the series. Three players for the Ducks, Ryan Getzlaf, David Perron, and Sami Vatanen, had two points in a 5–2 win in game five to stake the Ducks to a 3–2 series lead. The Predators forced their first ever seventh game after Rinne made 26 saves in a 3–1 win. In game seven, Rinne stopped 36 shots for the Predators in a 2–1 win to advance to the second round.

April 15	Nashville Predators	3–2	Anaheim Ducks	Honda Center	Recap
James Neal (1) – 00:35		First period	17:39 – pp – Ryan Getzlaf (1)
Colin Wilson (1) – 07:55		Second period	00:48 – Ryan Kesler (1)
Filip Forsberg (1) – 10:25		Third period	No scoring
Pekka Rinne 27 saves / 29 shots		Goalie stats	John Gibson 30 saves / 33 shots

April 17	Nashville Predators	3–2	Anaheim Ducks	Honda Center	Recap
Mattias Ekholm (1) – 19:04		First period	14:20 – Andrew Cogliano (1)
Craig Smith (1) – 09:55; Shea Weber (1) – pp – 19:21		Second period	No scoring
No scoring		Third period	17:18 – Nate Thompson (1)
Pekka Rinne 27 saves / 29 shots		Goalie stats	John Gibson 24 saves / 27 shots

April 19	Anaheim Ducks	3–0	Nashville Predators	Bridgestone Arena	Recap
Jamie McGinn (1) – 10:05		First period	No scoring
Rickard Rakell (1) – 11:33; Chris Stewart (1) – 17:06		Second period	No scoring
No scoring		Third period	No scoring
Frederik Andersen 27 saves / 27 shots		Goalie stats	Pekka Rinne 18 saves / 21 shots

April 21	Anaheim Ducks	4–1	Nashville Predators	Bridgestone Arena	Recap
Ryan Getzlaf (2) – 01:02		First period	No scoring
Nate Thompson (2) – 17:04; Jamie McGinn (2) – 18:56		Second period	11:26 – Mike Fisher (1)
Andrew Cogliano (2) – 16:52		Third period	No scoring
Frederik Andersen 30 saves / 31 shots		Goalie stats	Pekka Rinne 21 saves / 25 shots

April 23	Nashville Predators	2–5	Anaheim Ducks	Honda Center	Recap
No scoring		First period	No scoring
Ryan Johansen (1) – 14:13		Second period	14:35 – David Perron (1); 16:23 – Ryan Garbutt (1)
Miikka Salomaki (1) – 13:29		Third period	08:34 – Sami Vatanen (1); 16:37 – pp – Cam Fowler (1); 18:14 – en – Ryan Kesler (2)
Pekka Rinne 27 saves / 31 shots		Goalie stats	Frederik Andersen 27 saves / 29 shots

April 25	Anaheim Ducks	1–3	Nashville Predators	Bridgestone Arena	Recap
No scoring		First period	No scoring
Ryan Kesler (3) – pp – 19:46		Second period	08:10 – Mattias Ekholm (2); 17:45 – James Neal (2)
No scoring		Third period	19:50 – en – Shea Weber (2)
Frederik Andersen 23 saves / 25 shots		Goalie stats	Pekka Rinne 26 saves / 27 shots

April 27	Nashville Predators	2–1	Anaheim Ducks	Honda Center	Recap
Colin Wilson (2) – 06:19; Paul Gaustad (1) – 15:53		First period	No scoring
No scoring		Second period	No scoring
No scoring		Third period	01:45 – pp – Ryan Kesler (4)
Pekka Rinne 36 saves / 37 shots		Goalie stats	Frederik Andersen 18 saves / 20 shots

Nashville won series 4–3

==== (P2) Los Angeles Kings vs. (P3) San Jose Sharks ====
The Los Angeles Kings finished second in the Pacific Division, earning 102 points. The San Jose Sharks earned 98 points to finish third in the Pacific. This was the fourth meeting between these two teams, with Los Angeles winning two of the three previous meetings. They last met in the 2014 Western Conference first round, which Los Angeles came back from a 3–0 deficit to defeat the Sharks in seven games. San Jose won three of the five games of the regular season series.

The Sharks defeated the Kings in five games. In game one, Joe Pavelski scored twice including the game-winner to help the Sharks win 4–3. Sharks goalie, and former Kings backup goalie, Martin Jones allowed one goal on 27 shots in game two in a 2–1 win. Game three in San Jose required overtime with the game tied 1–1 after regulation time, before Tanner Pearson scored the game-winner for the Kings at 3:47 of the first overtime. In game four, all three Sharks goals came on the power play before the Kings tried to make a comeback cutting the deficit to 3–2, but that was the final score of the game. In game five, the Sharks took a 3–0 lead until the Kings scored three goals to tie the game in the second period. Early in the third period, San Jose rookie Joonas Donskoi's second goal of the game, broke the tie to give the Sharks a 4–3 lead; Joe Pavelski and Melker Karlsson provided insurance goals as the Sharks ended the series with a 6–3 victory.

April 14	San Jose Sharks	4–3	Los Angeles Kings	Staples Center	Recap
Joe Pavelski (1) – pp – 06:25		First period	02:53 – Jake Muzzin (1)
Brent Burns (1) – 06:50; Tomas Hertl (1) – 17:48		Second period	07:30 – pp – Jeff Carter (1); 17:18 – sh – Trevor Lewis (1)
Joe Pavelski (2) – 00:17		Third period	No scoring
Martin Jones 21 saves / 24 shots		Goalie stats	Jonathan Quick 19 saves / 23 shots

April 16	San Jose Sharks	2–1	Los Angeles Kings	Staples Center	Recap
Joe Pavelski (3) – 03:37		First period	No scoring
Logan Couture (1) – pp – 08:44		Second period	No scoring
No scoring		Third period	14:59 – pp – Vincent Lecavalier (1)
Martin Jones 26 saves / 27 shots		Goalie stats	Jonathan Quick 21 saves / 23 shots

April 18	Los Angeles Kings	2–1	OT	San Jose Sharks	SAP Center	Recap
Anze Kopitar (1) – pp – 08:10		First period		00:30 – Joe Thornton (1)
No scoring		Second period		No scoring
No scoring		Third period		No scoring
Tanner Pearson (1) – 03:47		First overtime period		No scoring
Jonathan Quick 29 saves / 30 shots		Goalie stats		Martin Jones 22 saves / 24 shots

April 20	Los Angeles Kings	2–3	San Jose Sharks	SAP Center	Recap
No scoring		First period	No scoring
No scoring		Second period	02:09 – pp – Brent Burns (2); 09:21 – pp – Joe Pavelski (4)
Trevor Lewis (2) – 02:49; Luke Schenn (1) – 06:44		Third period	01:40 – pp – Patrick Marleau (1)
Jonathan Quick 26 saves / 29 shots		Goalie stats	Martin Jones 26 saves / 28 shots

April 22	San Jose Sharks	6–3	Los Angeles Kings	Staples Center	Recap
Joonas Donskoi (1) – 01:08; Chris Tierney (1) – 11:21		First period	No scoring
Matt Nieto (1) – 04:05		Second period	07:44 – Anze Kopitar (2); 11:26 – Jeff Carter (2); 16:36 – Kris Versteeg (1)
Joonas Donskoi (2) – 03:58; Joe Pavelski (5) – 12:24; Melker Karlsson (1) – en – 19:38		Third period	No scoring
Martin Jones 19 saves / 22 shots		Goalie stats	Jonathan Quick 22 saves / 27 shots

San Jose won series 4–1

== Second round ==
=== Eastern Conference second round ===
==== (A2) Tampa Bay Lightning vs. (WC1) New York Islanders ====
This was the second playoff meeting between these teams; their only previous series was in the 2004 Eastern Conference quarterfinals, which Tampa Bay won in five games. This was the first series in the current playoff format in which a wild-card team had more points than its opponent during the regular season and did not have home ice advantage. New York won two of the three games of the regular season series.

The Lightning defeated the Islanders in five games. The Islanders took game one by a score of 5–3 with two goals scored by Shane Prince. Tyler Johnson scored two goals in a 4–1 victory for the Lightning in game two to tie the series. Games three and four both ended in overtime with Lightning victories as well as Nikita Kucherov scoring the tying goal in the third period. In game three, Kucherov scored with 39 seconds left in the third period to send it to overtime. In overtime, Brian Boyle scored the game-winner for a 5–4 win. In game four, Kucherov scored 7:49 into the third period to tie the game. Jason Garrison scored the game-winner for the Lightning 1:49 into overtime in a 2–1 win. Victor Hedman scored twice and Ben Bishop stopped all 28 shots for the Lightning in game five to move on to the conference finals for the second season in a row and third in six seasons.

April 27	New York Islanders	5–3	Tampa Bay Lightning	Amalie Arena	Recap
Travis Hamonic (1) – 05:44; Shane Prince (2) – 17:28; Shane Prince (3) – 19:57		First period	03:05 – Ondrej Palat (2)
John Tavares (6) – pp – 08:59		Second period	No scoring
Cal Clutterbuck (1) – en – 19:05		Third period	07:41 – Nikita Kucherov (6); 17:28 – Valtteri Filppula (1)
Thomas Greiss 33 saves / 36 shots		Goalie stats	Ben Bishop 9 saves / 13 shots Andrei Vasilevskiy 8 saves / 8 shots

April 30	New York Islanders	1–4	Tampa Bay Lightning	Amalie Arena	Recap
Nikolay Kulemin (1) – pp – 15:15		First period	06:03 – Tyler Johnson (3); 11:55 – Jonathan Drouin (1)
No scoring		Second period	11:59 – pp – Victor Hedman (1)
No scoring		Third period	17:42 – en – Tyler Johnson (4)
Thomas Greiss 27 saves / 30 shots		Goalie stats	Ben Bishop 19 saves / 20 shots

May 3	Tampa Bay Lightning	5–4	OT	New York Islanders	Barclays Center	Recap
Ryan Callahan (1) – pp – 19:47		First period		07:55 – Josh Bailey (1)
Victor Hedman (2) – 08:10		Second period		14:50 – Nick Leddy (1)
Vladislav Namestnikov (1) – 03:25; Nikita Kucherov (7) – 19:21		Third period		02:27 – pp – Josh Bailey (2); 11:23 – Cal Clutterbuck (2)
Brian Boyle (2) – 02:48		First overtime period		No scoring
Ben Bishop 35 saves / 39 shots		Goalie stats		Thomas Greiss 36 saves / 41 shots

May 6	Tampa Bay Lightning	2–1	OT	New York Islanders	Barclays Center	Recap
No scoring		First period		04:20 – pp – Kyle Okposo (2)
No scoring		Second period		No scoring
Nikita Kucherov (8) – 07:49		Third period		No scoring
Jason Garrison (1) – 01:34		First overtime period		No scoring
Ben Bishop 27 saves / 28 shots		Goalie stats		Thomas Greiss 20 saves / 22 shots Jean-Francois Berube 2 saves / 2 shots

May 8	New York Islanders	0–4	Tampa Bay Lightning	Amalie Arena	Recap
No scoring		First period	13:49 – Victor Hedman (3); 18:41 – Brian Boyle (3)
No scoring		Second period	04:22 – pp – Victor Hedman (4)
No scoring		Third period	04:40 – Nikita Kucherov (9)
Thomas Greiss 21 saves / 25 shots		Goalie stats	Ben Bishop 28 saves / 28 shots

Tampa Bay won series 4–1

==== (M1) Washington Capitals vs. (M2) Pittsburgh Penguins ====
This was the ninth playoff meeting between these teams, with Pittsburgh winning seven of the eight previous series. Their most recent meeting was in the 2009 Eastern Conference semifinals, which Pittsburgh won in seven games. Pittsburgh won three of the five games of the regular season series.

The Penguins defeated the Capitals in six games. T. J. Oshie scored a hat-trick, his third goal being in overtime, in game one for the Capitals in a 4–3 win. Former Capitals forward Eric Fehr scored the game-winner in the third period for the Penguins to take game two by a score of 2–1. Matt Murray made 47 saves for the Penguins in game three for a 3–2 victory. In game four, Patric Hornqvist scored the game-winner for the Penguins in overtime as well as an assist in a 3–2 win. The Capitals avoided elimination in game five, with Braden Holtby stopping 30 of the 31 shots he faced in a 3–1 win. In game six, Pittsburgh took a 3–0 lead with two goals from Phil Kessel before the Capitals tied the game 3–3 late in the third period. In overtime, Nick Bonino scored the series-winner 6:32 into the first overtime period to send the Pittsburgh Penguins to the Eastern Conference Final.

April 28	Pittsburgh Penguins	3–4	OT	Washington Capitals	Verizon Center	Recap
No scoring		First period		10:13 – Andre Burakovsky (1)
Ben Lovejoy (1) – 10:40; Evgeni Malkin (3) – 11:37		Second period		12:10 – T. J. Oshie (2)
Nick Bonino (1) – 08:42		Third period		03:23 – T. J. Oshie (3)
No scoring		First overtime period		09:33 – T. J. Oshie (4)
Matt Murray 31 saves / 35 shots		Goalie stats		Braden Holtby 42 saves / 45 shots

April 30	Pittsburgh Penguins	2–1	Washington Capitals	Verizon Center	Recap
No scoring		First period	No scoring
Carl Hagelin (2) – 07:08		Second period	No scoring
Eric Fehr (2) – 15:32		Third period	04:08 – pp – Marcus Johansson (2)
Matt Murray 23 saves / 24 shots		Goalie stats	Braden Holtby 33 saves / 35 shots

May 2	Washington Capitals	2–3	Pittsburgh Penguins	Consol Energy Center	Recap
No scoring		First period	06:37 – Patric Hornqvist (4); 07:37 – Tom Kuhnhackl (2)
No scoring		Second period	15:03 – Carl Hagelin (3)
Alexander Ovechkin (4) – 08:02; Justin Williams (1) – 19:04		Third period	No scoring
Braden Holtby 20 saves / 23 shots		Goalie stats	Matt Murray 47 saves / 49 shots

May 4	Washington Capitals	2–3	OT	Pittsburgh Penguins	Consol Energy Center	Recap
Jay Beagle (3) – 02:58		First period		09:16 – Trevor Daley (1)
John Carlson (4) – 16:19		Second period		03:07 – Matt Cullen (3)
No scoring		Third period		No scoring
No scoring		First overtime period		02:34 – Patric Hornqvist (5)
Braden Holtby 30 saves / 33 shots		Goalie stats		Matt Murray 34 saves / 36 shots

May 7	Pittsburgh Penguins	1–3	Washington Capitals	Verizon Center	Recap
Chris Kunitz (1) – pp – 07:08		First period	04:04 – pp – Alexander Ovechkin (5)
		Second period	04:00 – pp – T. J. Oshie (5); 09:58 – Justin Williams (2)
No scoring		Third period	No scoring
Matt Murray 16 saves / 19 shots		Goalie stats	Braden Holtby 30 saves / 31 shots

May 10	Washington Capitals	3–4	OT	Pittsburgh Penguins	Consol Energy Center	Recap
No scoring		First period		05:41 – Phil Kessel (4)
T. J. Oshie (6) – pp – 18:30		Second period		07:05 – pp – Phil Kessel (5); 07:38 – pp – Carl Hagelin (4)
Justin Williams (3) – 07:23; John Carlson (5) – pp – 13:01		Third period		No scoring
No scoring		First overtime period		06:32 – Nick Bonino (2)
Braden Holtby 37 saves / 41 shots		Goalie stats		Matt Murray 36 saves / 39 shots

Pittsburgh won series 4–2

=== Western Conference second round ===
==== (C1) Dallas Stars vs. (C2) St. Louis Blues ====
This was the thirteenth playoff meeting between these teams; the two teams have split the twelve previous series. They last met in the 2001 Western Conference semifinals, which St. Louis won in a four-game sweep. St. Louis won four of the five games of the regular season series.

The Blues defeated the Stars in seven games. In game one, Radek Faksa scored with 4:44 left in the third period to give the Dallas Stars a 2–1 win. In game two, Dallas scored two goals in the third period to tie the game 3–3 after being down 3–1. In overtime, Blues' captain David Backes scored a power play goal to tie the series at a game apiece. Alexander Steen scored twice and Vladimir Tarasenko scored a goal and two assists to help the Blues rout the Stars 6–1 in game three. Jamie Benn had two assists in game four as well as the overtime-game-winner by Cody Eakin for the Stars in a 3–2 win. In game five, Paul Stastny had a goal and an assist and Brian Elliott made 27 saves in a 4–1 victory to take a 3–2 series lead. Dallas scored three goals in the first period in game six prompting St. Louis head coach Ken Hitchcock to replace Elliott who had only stopped four shots. Dallas won the game 3–2 to force a seventh game. In game seven, six different players scored a goal for the Blues in a 6–1 victory to make their first Conference finals since 2001.

April 29	St. Louis Blues	1–2	Dallas Stars	American Airlines Center	Recap
No scoring		First period	No scoring
No scoring		Second period	09:36 – Antoine Roussel (2)
Kevin Shattenkirk (2) – 11:32		Third period	15:16 – Radek Faksa (2)
Brian Elliott 40 saves / 42 shots		Goalie stats	Kari Lehtonen 31 saves / 32 shots

May 1	St. Louis Blues	4–3	OT	Dallas Stars	American Airlines Center	Recap
Patrik Berglund (2) – 04:11; Joel Edmundson (1) – 07:02; Troy Brouwer (2) – pp – 18:40		First period		03:36 – Alex Goligoski (3)
No scoring		Second period		No scoring
No scoring		Third period		04:35 – Mattias Janmark (1); 17:24 – Jamie Benn (5)
David Backes (3) – pp – 10:58		First overtime period		No scoring
Brian Elliott 31 saves / 34 shots		Goalie stats		Kari Lehtonen 2 saves / 5 shots Antti Niemi 19 saves / 20 shots

May 3	Dallas Stars	1–6	St. Louis Blues	Scottrade Center	Recap
Colton Sceviour (2) – 04:44		First period	05:41 – Alexander Steen (2); 16:10 – pp – David Backes (4)
No scoring		Second period	02:34 – Troy Brouwer (3); 03:50 – Vladimir Tarasenko (5); 18:03 – pp – Alexander Steen (3)
No scoring		Third period	18:06 – David Backes (5)
Antti Niemi 9 saves / 12 shots Kari Lehtonen 24 saves / 27 shots		Goalie stats	Brian Elliott 25 saves / 26 shots

May 5	Dallas Stars	3–2	OT	St. Louis Blues	Scottrade Center	Recap
No scoring		First period		10:17 – Vladimir Tarasenko (6)
Radek Faksa (3) – 04:05; Patrick Sharp (4) – pp – 05:14		Second period		13:06 – pp – Paul Stastny (1)
No scoring		Third period		No scoring
Cody Eakin (1) – 02:58		First overtime period		No scoring
Kari Lehtonen 24 saves / 26 shots		Goalie stats		Brian Elliott 25 saves / 28 shots

May 7	St. Louis Blues	4–1	Dallas Stars	American Airlines Center	Recap
Robby Fabbri (2) – 06:00		First period	10:58 – Alex Goligoski (4)
Dmitrij Jaskin (1) – 10:31; Troy Brouwer (4) – 17:42		Second period	No scoring
Paul Stastny (2) – en – 18:20		Third period	No scoring
Brian Elliott 27 saves / 28 shots		Goalie stats	Kari Lehtonen 18 saves / 21 shots

May 9	Dallas Stars	3–2	St. Louis Blues	Scottrade Center	Recap
Mattias Janmark (2) – 04:53; Vernon Fiddler (1) – 05:13; Jason Spezza (5) – pp – 16:49		First period	No scoring
No scoring		Second period	07:29 – Alexander Steen (4)
No scoring		Third period	08:59 – Patrik Berglund (3)
Kari Lehtonen 35 saves / 37 shots		Goalie stats	Brian Elliott 4 saves / 7 shots Jake Allen 7 saves / 7 shots

May 11	St. Louis Blues	6–1	Dallas Stars	American Airlines Center	Recap
Robby Fabbri (3) – pp – 05:23; Paul Stastny (3) – 18:22; Patrik Berglund (4) – 19:56		First period	No scoring
David Backes (6) – 03:50; Troy Brouwer (5) – 15:06		Second period	No scoring
Vladimir Tarasenko (7) – en – 15:20		Third period	05:15 – Patrick Eaves (3)
Brian Elliott 31 saves / 32 shots		Goalie stats	Kari Lehtonen 5 saves / 8 shots Antti Niemi 8 saves / 10 shots

St. Louis won series 4–3

==== (P3) San Jose Sharks vs. (WC1) Nashville Predators ====
This was the third playoff meeting between these teams, with San Jose winning both previous series. They last met in the 2007 Western Conference quarterfinals, which San Jose won in five games. Nashville won two of the three games of the regular season series.

The Sharks defeated the Predators in seven games. The home team won every game in the series. Logan Couture scored two goals in game one for the Sharks in a 5–2 win. In game two, Martin Jones made 37 saves for the Sharks in a 3–2 win. Shea Weber scored a goal and an assist and Pekka Rinne made 26 saves in a 4–1 win for the Predators in game three. The Predators played in their longest playoff game in game four going 11:12 into triple overtime. Mike Fisher scored his second goal of the game to end overtime and tie the series with a 4–3 win. Joe Pavelski scored twice for the Sharks in game five who took a 3–2 series lead with a 5–1 win. In game six, the Predators came back from an early 2–0 deficit, sending the game into overtime. In overtime, rookie Viktor Arvidsson scored the game-winner to force a seventh game in a 4–3 win. In game seven, Martin Jones stopped all 20 shots and Logan Couture scored a goal and two assists in a 5–0 win to send the Sharks onto the Western Conference Final.

April 29	Nashville Predators	2–5	San Jose Sharks	SAP Center	Recap
No scoring		First period	No scoring
Mike Fisher (2) – pp – 04:33		Second period	No scoring
Ryan Johansen (2) – 18:11		Third period	02:37 – pp – Tomas Hertl (2); 11:49 – Joel Ward (1); 15:40 – pp – Logan Couture (2); 18:31 – en – Logan Couture (3); 19:10 – en – Tommy Wingels (1)
Pekka Rinne 33 saves / 36 shots		Goalie stats	Martin Jones 29 saves / 31 shots

May 1	Nashville Predators	2–3	San Jose Sharks	SAP Center	Recap
No scoring		First period	No scoring
No scoring		Second period	18:36 – pp – Logan Couture (4)
Mattias Ekholm (3) – 12:56; Ryan Johansen (3) – 19:55		Third period	17:20 – Joe Pavelski (6); 19:04 – en – Joe Thornton (2)
Pekka Rinne 22 saves / 24 shots		Goalie stats	Martin Jones 37 saves / 39 shots

May 3	San Jose Sharks	1–4	Nashville Predators	Bridgestone Arena	Recap
Patrick Marleau (2) – 13:13		First period	No scoring
No scoring		Second period	05:11 – pp – James Neal (3); 14:44 – Shea Weber (3)
		Third period	06:55 – Colin Wilson (3); 15:49 – pp – Filip Forsberg (2)
Martin Jones 21 saves / 25 shots		Goalie stats	Pekka Rinne 26 saves / 27 shots

May 5	San Jose Sharks	3–4	3OT	Nashville Predators	Bridgestone Arena	Recap
Brent Burns (3) – 03:08		First period		00:41 – Colin Wilson (4); 09:50 – Mike Fisher (3)
Joonas Donskoi (3) – 14:09		Second period		No scoring
Brent Burns (4) – pp – 06:48		Third period		15:39 – James Neal (4)
No scoring		Third overtime period		11:12 – Mike Fisher (4)
Martin Jones 41 saves / 45 shots		Goalie stats		Pekka Rinne 44 saves / 47 shots

May 7	Nashville Predators	1–5	San Jose Sharks	SAP Center	Recap
Mike Fisher (5) – 15:40		First period	10:47 – Patrick Marleau (3); 17:21 – Joe Pavelski (7)
No scoring		Second period	00:35 – Logan Couture (5); 19:22 – pp – Joe Pavelski (8)
No scoring		Third period	19:10 – Melker Karlsson (2)
Pekka Rinne 23 saves / 27 shots Carter Hutton 1 save / 2 shots		Goalie stats	Martin Jones 24 saves / 25 shots

May 9	San Jose Sharks	3–4	OT	Nashville Predators	Bridgestone Arena	Recap
Chris Tierney (2) – 09:55; Chris Tierney (3) – 11:51		First period		15:27 – Roman Josi (1)
No scoring		Second period		01:25 – Ryan Johansen (4)
Logan Couture (6) – pp – 10:04		Third period		12:44 – Colin Wilson (5)
No scoring		First overtime period		02:03 – Viktor Arvidsson (1)
Martin Jones 28 saves / 32 shots		Goalie stats		Pekka Rinne 15 saves / 18 shots

May 12	Nashville Predators	0–5	San Jose Sharks	SAP Center	Recap
No scoring		First period	09:02 – pp – Joe Pavelski (9); 16:51 – Joel Ward (2)
No scoring		Second period	00:36 – Logan Couture (7)
No scoring		Third period	00:32 – pp – Joe Thornton (3); 03:54 – Patrick Marleau (4)
Pekka Rinne 21 saves / 26 shots Carter Hutton 1 save / 1 shot		Goalie stats	Martin Jones 20 saves / 20 shots

San Jose won series 4–3

== Conference finals ==
=== Eastern Conference final ===
==== (M2) Pittsburgh Penguins vs. (A2) Tampa Bay Lightning ====
This was the second playoff meeting between these teams. Their only previous series was the 2011 Eastern Conference quarterfinals, which Tampa Bay came back from a 3–1 series deficit to win in seven games. Pittsburgh last made the conference finals in 2013 where they were swept in four games by the Boston Bruins. This was Tampa Bay's second consecutive Conference finals appearance; they defeated the Presidents' Trophy-winning New York Rangers in seven games in the previous year. Tampa Bay won all three games of the regular season series.

The Penguins defeated the Lightning in seven games. In game one, Lightning goaltender Ben Bishop suffered an ACL tear in the first period, requiring him to leave the game on a stretcher. Andrei Vasilevskiy made 25 saves in relief to help the Lightning win 3–1. Four goals were scored in the first period, two by each team, in game two leaving the score tied going into overtime. Sidney Crosby scored 40 seconds into overtime for the Penguins to tie the series. Carl Hagelin and Phil Kessel both had a goal and an assist for the Penguins in a 4–2 feat in game three. The Lightning tied the series in game four in a 4–3 win with both Nikita Kucherov and Alex Killorn providing two assists each, including the game-winning goal, and the team preventing a third period comeback from the Penguins. The Penguins gave up leads of both 2–0 and 3–2 and lost in overtime when Tyler Johnson scored for the Lightning 53 seconds into the first overtime period of game five. Although Brian Boyle scored twice for the Lightning, Pittsburgh forced a seventh game after a 5–2 victory in which Crosby had a goal and an assist. In game seven, Bryan Rust scored both goals for Pittsburgh in a 2–1 victory to send the Penguins to the Stanley Cup Finals for the first time since 2009 and fifth time in franchise history and prevented the Lightning from clinching a second consecutive appearance in the Stanley Cup Finals and third time in franchise history altogether.

May 13	Tampa Bay Lightning	3–1	Pittsburgh Penguins	Consol Energy Center	Recap
Alex Killorn (4) – 18:46		First period	No scoring
Ondrej Palat (3) – pp – 02:33; Jonathan Drouin (2) – 18:25		Second period	19:05 – pp – Patric Hornqvist (6)
No scoring		Third period	No scoring
Ben Bishop 9 saves / 9 shots Andrei Vasilevskiy 25 saves / 26 shots		Goalie stats	Matt Murray 17 saves / 20 shots

May 16	Tampa Bay Lightning	2–3	OT	Pittsburgh Penguins	Consol Energy Center	Recap
Anton Stralman (1) – 16:37; Jonathan Drouin (3) – 19:10		First period		04:32 – Matt Cullen (4); 09:37 – Phil Kessel (6)
No scoring		Second period		No scoring
No scoring		Third period		No scoring
No scoring		First overtime period		00:40 – Sidney Crosby (4)
Andrei Vasilevskiy 37 saves / 40 shots		Goalie stats		Matt Murray 19 saves / 21 shots

May 18	Pittsburgh Penguins	4–2	Tampa Bay Lightning	Amalie Arena	Recap
No scoring		First period	No scoring
Carl Hagelin (5) – 19:50		Second period	No scoring
Phil Kessel (7) – 05:16; Sidney Crosby (5) – pp – 10:50; Chris Kunitz (2) – 13:12		Third period	05:30 – Tyler Johnson (5); 18:16 – Ondrej Palat (4)
Matt Murray 26 saves / 28 shots		Goalie stats	Andrei Vasilevskiy 44 saves / 48 shots

May 20	Pittsburgh Penguins	3–4	Tampa Bay Lightning	Amalie Arena	Recap
No scoring		First period	00:27 – Ryan Callahan (2); 14:28 – Andrej Sustr (1)
No scoring		Second period	14:38 – pp – Jonathan Drouin (4); 17:48 – Tyler Johnson (6)
Phil Kessel (8) – 01:18; Evgeni Malkin (4) – 11:13; Chris Kunitz (3) – pp – 13:08		Third period	No scoring
Matt Murray 26 saves / 30 shots Marc-Andre Fleury 7 saves / 7 shots		Goalie stats	Andrei Vasilevskiy 35 saves / 38 shots

May 22	Tampa Bay Lightning	4–3	OT	Pittsburgh Penguins	Consol Energy Center	Recap
No scoring		First period		19:59 – Brian Dumoulin (1)
Alex Killorn (5) – 13:15; Nikita Kucherov (10) – 14:25		Second period		01:30 – Patric Hornqvist (7); 19:10 – Chris Kunitz (4)
Nikita Kucherov (11) – 16:44		Third period		No scoring
Tyler Johnson (7) – 00:53		First overtime period		No scoring
Andrei Vasilevskiy 31 saves / 34 shots		Goalie stats		Marc-Andre Fleury 21 saves / 25 shots

May 24	Pittsburgh Penguins	5–2	Tampa Bay Lightning	Amalie Arena	Recap
Phil Kessel (9) – pp – 18:46		First period	No scoring
Kris Letang (2) – 07:40; Sidney Crosby (6) – 19:34		Second period	No scoring
Bryan Rust (3) – 17:52; Nick Bonino (3) – en – 19:06		Third period	05:30 – Brian Boyle (4); 12:43 – Brian Boyle (5)
Matt Murray 29 saves / 31 shots		Goalie stats	Andrei Vasilevskiy 29 saves / 33 shots

May 26	Tampa Bay Lightning	1–2	Pittsburgh Penguins	Consol Energy Center	Recap
No scoring		First period	No scoring
Jonathan Drouin (5) – 09:36		Second period	01:55 – Bryan Rust (4); 10:06 – Bryan Rust (5)
No scoring		Third period	No scoring
Andrei Vasilevskiy 37 saves / 39 shots		Goalie stats	Matt Murray 16 saves / 17 shots

Pittsburgh won series 4–3

=== Western Conference final ===
==== (C2) St. Louis Blues vs. (P3) San Jose Sharks ====
This was the fifth playoff meeting between these teams, with both teams splitting the four previous playoff series. They last met in the 2012 Western Conference quarterfinals, which St. Louis won in five games. St. Louis most recently made the conference finals in 2001, when they lost to the Colorado Avalanche in five games. San Jose last made the conference finals in 2011, where they lost in five games to the Vancouver Canucks. San Jose won two of the three games of the regular season series.

The Sharks defeated the Blues in six games. The Blues won game one 2–1 with help from goalie Brian Elliott who made 31 saves in the process. The Sharks bounced back in game two with Brent Burns scoring twice and goalie Martin Jones stopping all 26 shots he faced in a 4–0 win. In game three, Jones again shutout the Blues, blocking 22 shots; Tomas Hertl scored twice for the Sharks in their 3–0 victory at home. Troy Brouwer and Kyle Brodziak scored twice in a 6–3 victory for the Blues to tie the series in game four. Joe Pavelski and Joel Ward both scored twice in the Sharks' 6–3 victory in game five. The Sharks were able to advance to the Stanley Cup Finals for the first time in their 25-year history after game six with Joel Ward scoring the winning goal 3:01 into the third period in a 5–2 victory.

May 15	San Jose Sharks	1–2	St. Louis Blues	Scottrade Center	Recap
Tomas Hertl (3) – 15:38		First period	15:04 – pp – David Backes (7)
No scoring		Second period	09:15 – Jori Lehtera (2)
No scoring		Third period	No scoring
Martin Jones 21 saves / 23 shots		Goalie stats	Brian Elliott 31 saves / 32 shots

May 17	San Jose Sharks	4–0	St. Louis Blues	Scottrade Center	Recap
Tommy Wingels (2) – 02:07		First period	No scoring
Brent Burns (5) – pp – 07:04		Second period	No scoring
Brent Burns (6) – pp – 11:58; Dainius Zubrus (1) – en – 19:41		Third period	No scoring
Martin Jones 26 saves / 26 shots		Goalie stats	Brian Elliott 20 saves / 23 shots

May 19	St. Louis Blues	0–3	San Jose Sharks	SAP Center	Recap
No scoring		First period	15:53 – Tomas Hertl (4)
No scoring		Second period	11:44 – Joonas Donskoi (4)
No scoring		Third period	06:09 – Tomas Hertl (5)
Brian Elliott 11 saves / 14 shots Jake Allen 2 saves / 2 shots		Goalie stats	Martin Jones 22 saves / 22 shots

May 21	St. Louis Blues	6–3	San Jose Sharks	SAP Center	Recap
Troy Brouwer (6) – pp – 06:14; Jori Lehtera (3) – 10:11		First period	No scoring
Kyle Brodziak (1) – sh – 06:09; Kyle Brodziak (2) – 10:11		Second period	No scoring
Troy Brouwer (7) – pp – 03:55; Alex Pietrangelo (2) – en – 15:39		Third period	01:05 – Joe Pavelski (10); 06:57 – Chris Tierney (4); 16:28 – Melker Karlsson (3)
Jake Allen 31 saves / 34 shots		Goalie stats	Martin Jones 15 saves / 19 shots James Reimer 6 saves / 7 shots

May 23	San Jose Sharks	6–3	St. Louis Blues	Scottrade Center	Recap
Marc-Edouard Vlasic (1) – 03:51		First period	07:04 – Jaden Schwartz (4); 15:08 – Troy Brouwer (8)
Joel Ward (3) – pp – 04:37; Joe Pavelski (11) – pp – 18:33		Second period	11:58 – pp – Robby Fabbri (4)
Joe Pavelski (12) – 00:16; Chris Tierney (5) – en – 19:06; Joel Ward (4) – en – 19:27		Third period	No scoring
Martin Jones 18 saves / 21 shots		Goalie stats	Jake Allen 21 saves / 25 shots

May 25	St. Louis Blues	2–5	San Jose Sharks	SAP Center	Recap
No scoring		First period	03:57 – Joe Pavelski (13)
No scoring		Second period	05:02 – Joel Ward (5)
Vladimir Tarasenko (8) – 11:39; Vladimir Tarasenko (9) – 16:25		Third period	03:01 – Joel Ward (6); 08:11 – Joonas Donskoi (5); 19:40 – en – Logan Couture (8)
Brian Elliott 22 saves / 26 shots Jake Allen 0 saves / 0 shots		Goalie stats	Martin Jones 24 saves / 26 shots

San Jose won series 4–2

== Stanley Cup Finals ==
This was the first playoff meeting between these two teams. Pittsburgh made their fifth Stanley Cup Finals appearance; their most recent appearance was in 2009, when they defeated the Detroit Red Wings in seven games. San Jose made their first Finals appearance in their twenty-fifth season since entering the league in 1991–92. These teams split their two-game regular season series.

May 30	San Jose Sharks	2–3	Pittsburgh Penguins	Consol Energy Center	Recap
No scoring		First period	12:46 – Bryan Rust (6); 13:48 – Conor Sheary (3)
Tomas Hertl (6) – pp – 03:02; Patrick Marleau (5) – 18:12		Second period	No scoring
No scoring		Third period	17:27 – Nick Bonino (4)
Martin Jones 38 saves / 41 shots		Goalie stats	Matt Murray 24 saves / 26 shots

June 1	San Jose Sharks	1–2	OT	Pittsburgh Penguins	Consol Energy Center	Recap
No scoring		First period		No scoring
No scoring		Second period		08:20 – Phil Kessel (10)
Justin Braun (1) – 15:55		Third period		No scoring
No scoring		First overtime period		02:35 – Conor Sheary (4)
Martin Jones 28 saves / 30 shots		Goalie stats		Matt Murray 21 saves / 22 shots

June 4	Pittsburgh Penguins	2–3	OT	San Jose Sharks	SAP Center	Recap
Ben Lovejoy (2) – 05:29		First period		09:34 – Justin Braun (2)
Patric Hornqvist (8) – 19:07		Second period		No scoring
No scoring		Third period		08:48 – pp – Joel Ward (7)
No scoring		First overtime period		12:18 – Joonas Donskoi (6)
Matt Murray 23 saves / 26 shots		Goalie stats		Martin Jones 40 saves / 42 shots

June 6	Pittsburgh Penguins	3–1	San Jose Sharks	SAP Center	Recap
Ian Cole (1) – 07:36		First period	No scoring
Evgeni Malkin (5) – pp – 02:37		Second period	No scoring
Eric Fehr (3) – 17:58		Third period	08:07 – Melker Karlsson (4)
Matt Murray 23 saves / 24 shots		Goalie stats	Martin Jones 17 saves / 20 shots

June 9	San Jose Sharks	4–2	Pittsburgh Penguins	Consol Energy Center	Recap
Brent Burns (7) – 01:04; Logan Couture (9) – 02:43; Melker Karlsson (5) – 14:47		First period	04:44 – pp – Evgeni Malkin (6); 05:06 – Carl Hagelin (6)
No scoring		Second period	No scoring
Joe Pavelski (14) – en – 18:40		Third period	No scoring
Martin Jones 44 saves / 46 shots		Goalie stats	Matt Murray 18 saves / 21 shots

June 12	Pittsburgh Penguins	3–1	San Jose Sharks	SAP Center	Recap
Brian Dumoulin (2) – pp – 08:16		First period	No scoring
Kris Letang (3) – 07:46		Second period	06:27 – Logan Couture (10)
Patric Hornqvist (9) – en – 18:58		Third period	No scoring
Matt Murray 18 saves / 19 shots		Goalie stats	Martin Jones 24 saves / 26 shots

Pittsburgh won series 4–2

== Player statistics ==
=== Skaters ===
These are the top ten skaters based on points.

Player	Team	GP	G	A	Pts	+/–	PIM
Logan Couture	San Jose Sharks	24	10	20	30	+5	8
Brent Burns	San Jose Sharks	24	7	17	24	+11	12
Joe Pavelski	San Jose Sharks	24	14	9	23	+1	4
Phil Kessel	Pittsburgh Penguins	24	10	12	22	+5	4
Joe Thornton	San Jose Sharks	24	3	18	21	+2	10
Nikita Kucherov	Tampa Bay Lightning	17	11	8	19	+13	8
Sidney Crosby	Pittsburgh Penguins	24	6	13	19	–2	4
Evgeni Malkin	Pittsburgh Penguins	23	6	12	18	+1	18
Nick Bonino	Pittsburgh Penguins	24	4	14	18	+9	12
Tyler Johnson	Tampa Bay Lightning	17	7	10	17	+9	12

=== Goaltenders ===
This is a combined table of the top five goaltenders based on goals against average and the top five goaltenders based on save percentage, with at least 420 minutes played. The table is sorted by GAA, and the criteria for inclusion are bolded.

Player	Team	GP	W	L	SA	GA	GAA	SV%	SO	TOI
Braden Holtby	Washington Capitals	12	6	6	363	21	**1.72**	.942	2	731:32
Ben Bishop	Tampa Bay Lightning	11	8	2	297	18	**1.85**	.939	2	582:26
Roberto Luongo	Florida Panthers	6	2	4	227	15	**2.05**	.934	0	438:20
Matt Murray	Pittsburgh Penguins	21	15	6	575	44	**2.08**	.923	1	1267:16
Martin Jones	San Jose Sharks	24	14	10	684	53	**2.16**	.923	3	1473:18
Andrei Vasilevskiy	Tampa Bay Lightning	8	3	4	267	20	2.76	.925	0	434:25

== Television ==
This marked the fifth postseason under NBC Sports' 10-year contract for American television rights, and the second under Sportsnet and TVA Sports' current 12-year contract for Canadian television rights. In the United States, all playoff games were nationally televised by either NBC, NBCSN, CNBC, USA Network, and NHL Network. During the first round, these national telecasts co-existed with those of the regional rightsholders, after which NBC had exclusive rights to the remaining games.

In Canada, this marked the second postseason under Rogers Media's 12-year contract. Games aired across Sportsnet, SN1, SN360, FX, and CBC under the Hockey Night in Canada brand. Games also aired in French by TVA Sports.

With all seven of the NHL's Canadian teams out of the playoffs, media sources predicted that Rogers would take a massive decline in viewership. During the regular season, the Sunday-night Hometown Hockey games saw ratings drop 34 percent, while Hockey Night in Canada fell 18 per cent, culminating in the season closer on April 9 that attracted just 721,000 viewers. To cut production costs, Rogers only employed three full-time play-by-play crews, along with a fourth on spot duty, during the first round. In the second round, Rogers only sent a crew for games broadcast on CBC, while simulcasting NBC's feeds for all other games (which aired on Sportsnet). The Hockey News estimated that Rogers saved CA$100,000 per game if they simulcasted a U.S. feed instead of producing their own separate broadcast.

Ratings were also down in the United States, with the conference finals down by 9%, and ratings for the finals down to an average of 4 million viewers, making it the third-lowest-rated finals since 2006. The decline was credited to multiple factors, including the lack of Original Six teams or teams from key media markets such as Chicago, Los Angeles, and New York, and heavy competition from the 2016 NBA Playoffs and Game of Thrones (which aired against the series-ending game 6).

Preceded by 2015 Stanley Cup playoffs	Stanley Cup playoffs 2016	Succeeded by 2017 Stanley Cup playoffs
