= Robby Fabbri =

Canadian ice hockey player (born 1996)

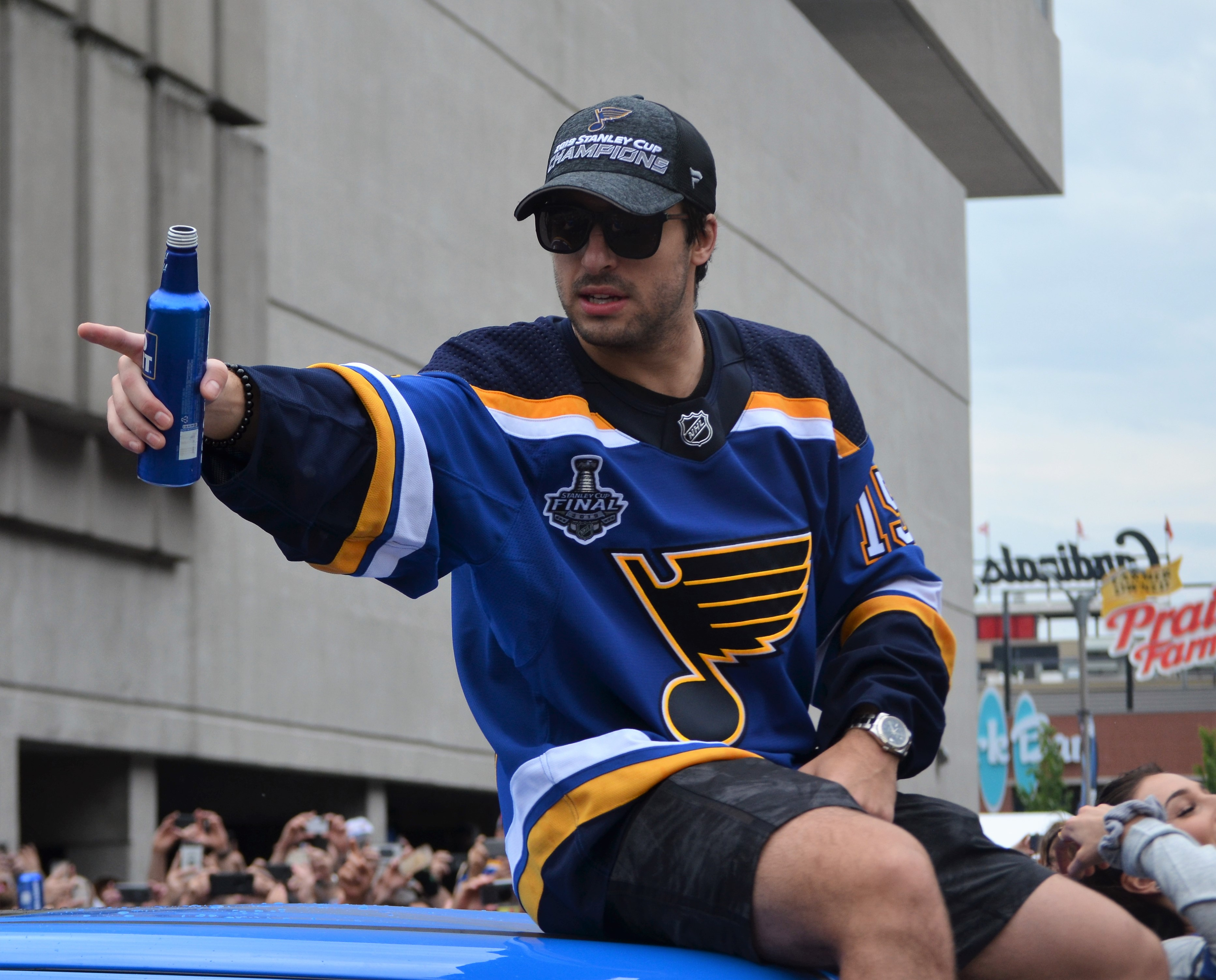
- Fabbri with the St. Louis Blues in 2019
- Born: January 22, 1996 (age 30) Mississauga, Ontario, Canada
- Height: 5 ft 10 in (178 cm)
- Weight: 185 lb (84 kg; 13 st 3 lb)
- Position: Forward
- Shoots: Left
- NHL team Former teams: Free agent St. Louis Blues; Detroit Red Wings; Anaheim Ducks; Minnesota Wild
- NHL draft: 21st overall, 2014; St. Louis Blues
- Playing career: 2015–present

Robert Fabbri (born January 22, 1996) is a Canadian professional ice hockey player who is a forward and current unrestricted free agent. He most recently played for the Minnesota Wild of the National Hockey League (NHL). He was drafted in the first round, 21st overall, by the St. Louis Blues in the 2014 NHL entry draft, and has also played for the Detroit Red Wings and Anaheim Ducks

Growing up in Mississauga, Fabbri played youth hockey for the Minor Atom Mississauga Senators and Mississauga Rebels before being drafted sixth overall by the Guelph Storm during the 2012 Ontario Hockey League (OHL) draft. During his tenure with the team, he earned the Wayne Gretzky 99 Award as playoff MVP before beginning his professional career with the St. Louis Blues. Fabbri joined the Blues during their 2015–16 season, setting a franchise record as the youngest player to score a goal for the team and second youngest Blues player to record a hat trick. He later won the Stanley Cup as a member of the Blues in 2019 before being traded to the Detroit Red Wings. After one season with the Anaheim Ducks, Fabbri returned to the Blues in 2025, before being claimed off waivers by the Wild later that season.

== Early life ==
Fabbri was born on January 22, 1996, in Mississauga, Ontario, to parents Len and Stef Fabbri. He is of Italian descent from his grandparents. Fabbri considers his older brother Lenny "the most influential person in his hockey career." Growing up, he attended Our Lady of Mercy Elementary School and St. Aloysius Gonzaga Secondary School.

== Playing career ==
=== Youth ===
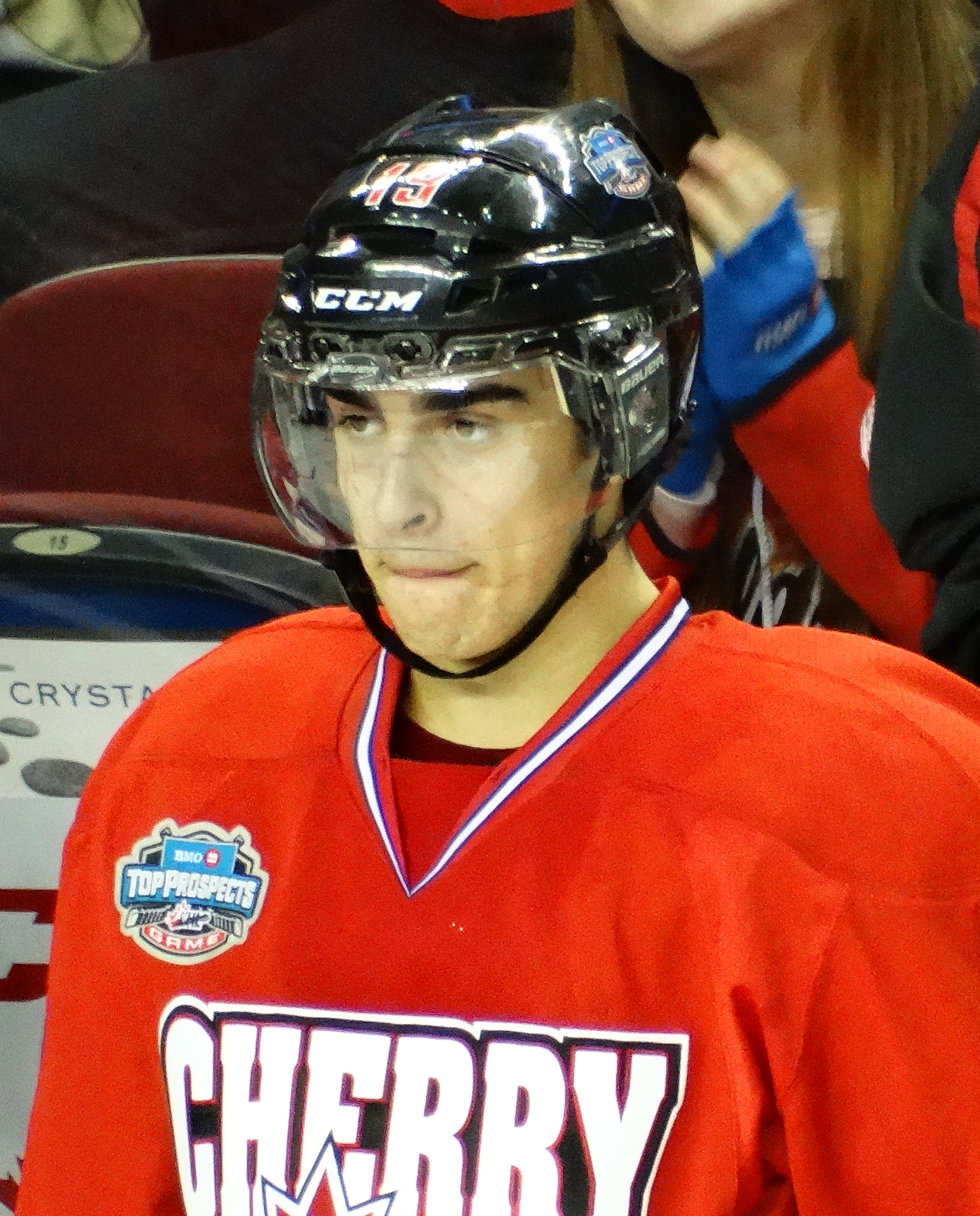
Fabbri at the 2014 CHL/NHL Top Prospects Game

As a child growing up in Mississauga, Fabbri began playing ice hockey as a result of his older brother Lenny. He soon surpassed his older brother when he was enrolled in youth hockey programs and began playing with the year above his in the Minor Atom Mississauga Senators. He began his junior ice hockey career with the Mississauga Rebels in the Greater Toronto Hockey League (GTHL) before being drafted by the Guelph Storm in the first round, sixth overall, of the 2012 Ontario Hockey League (OHL) Priority Selection. When reflecting on their selections, Guelph's general manager Mike Kelly stated that Fabbri "has a high, high, high compete level. He's cut from the same cloth as Hunter Garlent, only he's a little bit bigger." On the day of his draft, Fabbri weighed 150 pounds (68 kg) but gained up to 160 pounds (73 kg) by the start of the season.

In his first year with the Guelph Storm, Fabbri recorded 33 points in 59 games. He recorded his first career major junior goal on September 6, 2012, in a 6–2 win over the Mississauga Steelheads. By November, Fabbri collected 11 points in 18 games and recorded his first career hat-trick during a 9–4 loss to the Niagara IceDogs. A few days later, Fabbri and prospect Matthew Mancina were selected to compete for Canada Ontario at the 2013 World U-17 Hockey Challenge. Upon returning from the tournament empty handed, Fabbri was selected to replace Rebels' first line during a 6–3 win over the Windsor Spitfires, where he recorded one assist. After the Storm lost in the OHL playoffs, Fabbri was named the team's Rookie of the Year.

As a result of his successful rookie campaign, Fabbri was invited to compete with the Canadian National U18 team at the 2013 Ivan Hlinka Memorial Tournament. He returned to the Storm for his sophomore season with a gold medal from the tournament. Leading up to the 2014 NHL entry draft, Fabbri was ranked 21st for North American skaters in the NHL Central Scouting Bureau's final rankings. On November 9, 2013, Fabbri was suspended for 10 games as a result of a check to the head during a game against the Kitchener Rangers. Returning from his suspension, Fabbri was chosen to compete at the 2014 CHL/NHL Top Prospects Game. Fabbri and the Storm qualified for the 2014 OHL playoffs where they competed against the Plymouth Whalers in the first round. During the second period of Game 1, Fabbri was hit from behind by Whalers defenceman Yannick Rathgeb, resulting in a 10-game suspension. The Storm beat the Whalers and Fabbri went on to record 28 points in 16 games to help the team win their third J. Ross Robertson Cup in franchise history. After concluding the season with a career-high 87 points in 58 games, Fabbri was selected in the first round, 21st overall, by the St. Louis Blues. Prior to his selection, he stated that he'd enjoy studying business at the University of Guelph after graduating from Our Lady of Lourdes Catholic School.

On September 3, 2014, Fabbri signed a three-year, two way entry-level contract with the Blues but returned to the Storm for his final year of major junior hockey. He was invited to participate in the 2015 World Junior Championships where he suffered an ankle injury during the quarterfinals against Denmark and was held to only 30 games for the OHL season. Fabbri returned to the lineup after missing two months in a 5–2 loss to the Sarnia Sting on March 9, 2015. He would bounce back a few games later with a five-point night against the Windsor Spitfires in a 9–3 win. The Storm qualified for the 2015 OHL playoffs where they were eventually eliminated in the Western Conference semifinals by the Sault Ste. Marie Greyhounds. At the time, Fabbri was named the 10th best forward in Guelph Storm's history with 171 points in 147 regular season games.

=== Professional ===
==== St. Louis Blues ====
At the conclusion of the 2014–15 season with the Storm, Fabbri was reassigned by the Blues to their American Hockey League (AHL) affiliate, the Chicago Wolves, on April 15, 2015. He was expected to replace injured Ty Rattie on a line with Jeremy Welsh and Adam Cracknell. He made his AHL debut on April 17 against the Rockford IceHogs, where he also became the first player in franchise history to record two points in his debut. A few days later, he made his postseason debut with the team as they entered Game 1 against the Utica Comets for the 2015 Calder Cup playoffs.

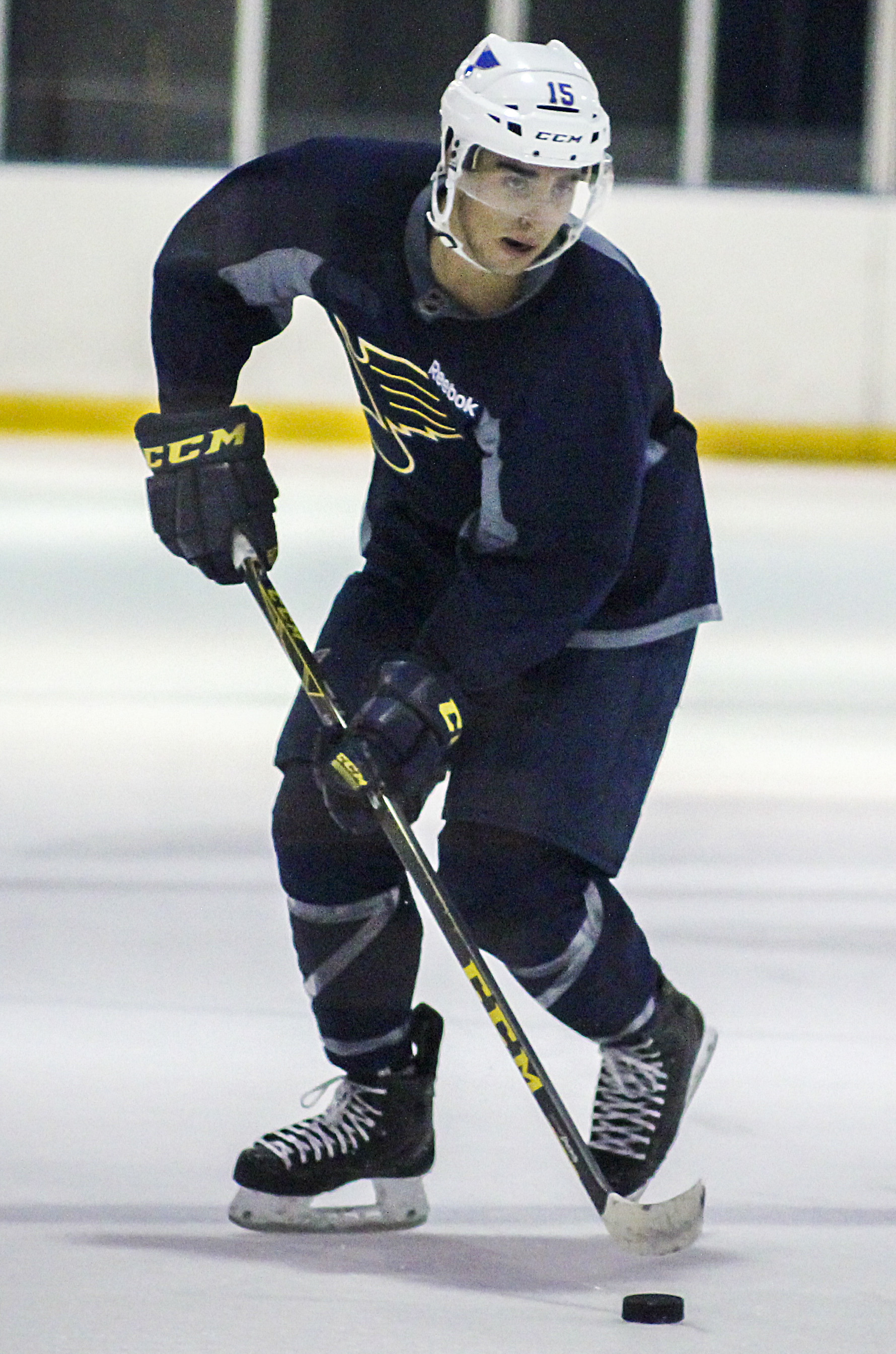
Fabbri practicing with the Blues in 2015

Following his season with the Wolves, Fabbri made the Blues' opening night roster for the 2015–16 season. He made his NHL debut on October 8, 2015, against the Edmonton Oilers at 19 years, 259 days, becoming the youngest player in franchise history to score his first NHL goal. By December, he had recorded nine goals, securing him a spot in seventh place amongst rookie goalscorers. Blues' Head Coach Ken Hitchcock praised Fabbri's goalscoring ability by saying "If you look at his goals, there's maybe one that the goalie could have saved. All the rest just flat beat (the goalie). That's pretty impressive. Now he's up to the pace of the game and he's going to be a threat all the time." His scoring improved and by February 14, 2016, he was tied for third amongst rookie scorers and became the first Blues player to participate in a fight since April 5, 2011. He continued to set records throughout his rookie season and soon became the first Blues rookie since Patrik Berglund in 2008–09 to reach the 15-goal mark. Shortly after reaching the 15-goal mark, Fabbri suffered a lower body injury as a result of a cross-check from Colorado Avalanche forward Jack Skille and was listed as day-to-day. He ended up missing four games before returning to the lineup for the Blues' last game of the regular season against the Washington Capitals. The Blues qualified for the 2016 Stanley Cup playoffs and Fabbri helped the team beat the Chicago Blackhawks during the Western Conference First Round. In seven games he had recorded five points and was fourth on the team in scoring.

The following season, Fabbri was once again named to the Blues' opening night roster for the 2016–17 season. After going seven games without a goal, Fabbri scored his first career NHL hat-trick on December 28, 2016, in a 6–3 win over the Philadelphia Flyers. He subsequently became the second youngest Blues player to record a hat trick, just behind Bernie Federko who achieved the feat at 20 years, 269 days. In spite of his early success, his season was cut short after he incurred an injury during a game against the Pittsburgh Penguins on February 4, 2017. Midway through the first period, he suffered a torn ACL in his left knee and was out for the remainder of the regular season and 2017 Stanley Cup playoffs. At the time of his injury, he had scored 11 goals and 18 assists for 29 points in 51 games played. Fabbri underwent surgery in Chicago on February 28, 2016, and was medically cleared to play on July 31. He returned to the Blues' roster for their training camp leading up to the 2017–18 season, but re-injured his left knee and was out for the entirety of the season.

Following a second surgery and being medically cleared to play, Fabbri signed a one-year, $925,000 contract with the St. Louis Blues for the 2018–19 season. He attended the BioSteel Hockey camp in August where Dallas Stars forward Tyler Seguin called him a "very determined guy" and said, "I know he's a good teammate for the guys in St. Louis, and I wouldn't be surprised if he had a heck of a year." Fabbri also attended the Blues' training camp where Head Coach Mike Yeo said he "looked good...He's skating, he's shooting, he's doing the things you hoped he could do and is showing his skill level… We've got a lot of belief in Robby and in his capabilities." In spite of this, he was reassigned to their AHL affiliate the San Antonio Rampage on a conditioning assignment, with the expectation he would rejoin the Blues eventually. Fabbri made his return to the Blues lineup on November 1, 2018, recording an assist in a 5–3 win over the Vegas Golden Knights. A few days later, he scored his first goal since December 28, 2016, en route to a 4–1 win over the Carolina Hurricanes. In spite of his hot start, by January 2019, the Blues were in last place around the entire league, which resulted in a coaching and goaltender change. Following the coaching change, the Blues qualified for the 2019 Stanley Cup playoffs. Fabbri recorded one goal in 10 postseason games to help the Blues defeat the Boston Bruins to win the 2019 Stanley Cup. On July 12, 2019, following their Stanley Cup win, Fabbri signed a one-year, $900,000 contract to stay with the Blues before spending his day with the Cup in his hometown of Mississauga.

Fabbri re-joined the team for their 2019–20 season and played nine games for them before being traded to the Detroit Red Wings in exchange for Jacob de la Rose on November 6, 2019.

==== Detroit Red Wings ====
Fabbri made his debut for the Red Wings on November 8, in a game against the Boston Bruins. He scored two power play goals in the 4–2 win, becoming the seventh player in franchise history to do so in their first game with the team. Following a 4–1 loss to the Toronto Maple Leafs on December 21, 2019, Fabbri was fined $2,419.35 for spearing Alexander Kerfoot. After enduring a seven-game scoring drought, Fabbri recorded his 12th goal of the season to tie for third on the team in goals during a 4–2 loss to the New York Rangers on January 30, 2020. His scoring slowed down during the month of February due to two injuries. He first suffered a lower-body injury during a game against the Boston Bruins on February 9, and was then reinjured after colliding with New Jersey Devils forward Jack Hughes. By the conclusion of the regular season, a few games early due to the coronavirus pandemic, Fabbri had recorded 31 points in 52 games for the team.

On August 24, 2020, Fabbri signed a two-year, $5.9 million contract extension with the Red Wings. He played centre for the first two games of the delayed 2020–21 season before testing positive for COVID-19 and spending two weeks in isolation. Upon returning in February, he was remanded to winger with Dylan Larkin and Bobby Ryan. During his first season with the team, Fabbri was limited to 30 games but recorded 10 goals and eight assists. His eight-game winning goals led the Red Wings and he was in a three-way tie for best plus-minus rating.

Fabbri returned to the Red Wings for the 2021–22 season. On December 13, 2021, Fabbri signed a three-year, $12 million contract extension with the Red Wings. Shortly following this extension, Fabbri again tested positive for COVID and was placed on the league's COVID protocol. After completing the mandatory 10-day quarantine, Fabbri returned to the Red Wings lineup on December 26. His season was cut short in March 2022 after suffering his third career ACL tear during a 6–5 shootout loss to the Minnesota Wild. At the time of the injury, Fabbri had accumulated 17 goals and 30 points through 56 games and was maintaining a three-game goal streak.

After recovering from his third career ACL tear, Fabbri made his 2022–23 season debut on January 4, 2023, against the New Jersey Devils. He added seven goals and nine assists for 16 points before sustaining a lower-body injury against the Chicago Blackhawks on March 8. He underwent surgery that month, leaving him unavailable for the remainder of Detroit's regular season.

==== Anaheim Ducks ====
Fabbri was traded to the Anaheim Ducks along with a conditional fourth round 2025 draft pick (either Boston or Detroit's own selection) on July 3, 2024, by the Red Wings in exchange for goaltender Gage Alexander.

==== Return to St. Louis ====
The Ducks did not re-sign Fabbri following the 2024–25 NHL season, making him a free agent. Fabbri signed a professional tryout (PTO) with the Pittsburgh Penguins on September 17, 2025. Fabbri did not make Pittsburgh's final roster, and subsequently signed another PTO with the AHL's Charlotte Checkers on December 1. After just three games played in Charlotte, however, Fabbri returned to the NHL, signing a one-year contract to return to the St. Louis Blues on December 10.

==== Minnesota Wild ====
On March 1, 2026, Fabbri was waived by the Blues, and subsequently claimed by the Minnesota Wild the following day.

== Personal life ==
Fabbri became engaged to his girlfriend in June 2020.

== Career statistics ==
Medal record

Men's ice hockey

Representing Canada

Ivan Hlinka Memorial Tournament
Gold medal – first place	2013 Piešťany	

World Junior Championships
Gold medal – first place	2015 Canada	

=== Regular season and playoffs ===
			Regular season					Playoffs
Season	Team	League	GP	G	A	Pts	PIM	GP	G	A	Pts	PIM
2011–12	Mississauga Rebels	GTHL	60	57	48	105	75	—	—	—	—	—
2011–12	Toronto Jr. Canadiens	OJHL	1	0	3	3	0	1	0	0	0	0
2012–13	Guelph Storm	OHL	59	10	23	33	38	5	0	1	1	4
2013–14	Guelph Storm	OHL	58	45	42	87	55	16	13	15	28	12
2014–15	Guelph Storm	OHL	30	25	26	51	40	9	1	3	4	17
2014–15	Chicago Wolves	AHL	3	1	3	4	2	3	0	0	0	0
2015–16	St. Louis Blues	NHL	72	18	19	37	25	20	4	11	15	6
2016–17	St. Louis Blues	NHL	51	11	18	29	27	—	—	—	—	—
2018–19	San Antonio Rampage	AHL	3	1	1	2	4	—	—	—	—	—
2018–19	St. Louis Blues	NHL	32	2	4	6	6	10	1	0	1	0
2019–20	St. Louis Blues	NHL	9	1	0	1	2	—	—	—	—	—
2019–20	Detroit Red Wings	NHL	52	14	17	31	18	—	—	—	—	—
2020–21	Detroit Red Wings	NHL	30	10	8	18	16	—	—	—	—	—
2021–22	Detroit Red Wings	NHL	56	17	13	30	35	—	—	—	—	—
2022–23	Detroit Red Wings	NHL	28	7	9	16	22	—	—	—	—	—
2023–24	Detroit Red Wings	NHL	68	18	14	32	32	—	—	—	—	—
2024–25	Anaheim Ducks	NHL	44	8	8	16	20	—	—	—	—	—
2025–26	Charlotte Checkers	AHL	3	1	1	2	0	—	—	—	—	—
2025–26	St. Louis Blues	NHL	15	1	3	4	12	—	—	—	—	—
2025–26	Minnesota Wild	NHL	6	1	0	1	4	—	—	—	—	—
NHL totals			463	108	113	221	219	30	5	11	16	6

=== International ===
Year	Team	Event	Result	GP	G	A	Pts	PIM
2013	Canada Ontario	U17	6th	5	3	1	4	27
2013	Canada	IH18	1st place, gold medalist(s)	5	0	1	1	4
2015	Canada	WJC	1st place, gold medalist(s)	5	2	4	6	0
Junior totals				15	5	6	11	31

== Awards and honours ==
Award	Year	Ref
OHL
Wayne Gretzky 99 Award	2014	
NHL
Stanley Cup champion	2019	

Awards and achievements
Preceded by Jordan Schmaltz	St. Louis Blues first-round draft pick 2014	Succeeded by Tage Thompson
