= Eva Björklund =

Swedish politician (born 1942)

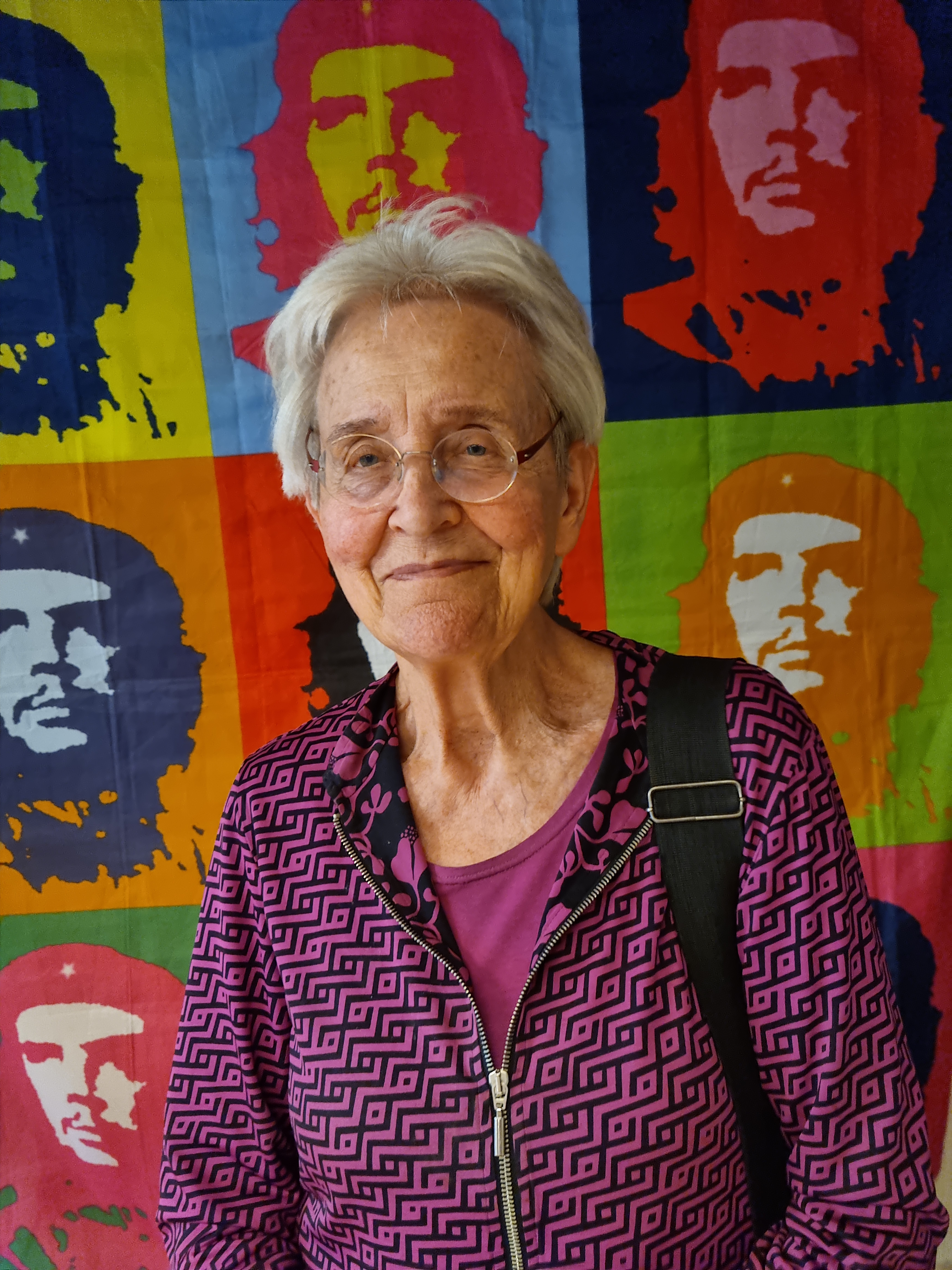
Eva Björklund in 2022

Eva Birgitta Björklund (born November 12, 1942, in Lycksele, Västerbotten County) is a Swedish Left Party politician. She is currently a substitute to the board of the Left Party, and editor of the periodical Kuba ("Cuba") which is published by the Swedish-Cuban Association. She is a former chairman of the Swedish-Cuban Association. She has also translated many texts by Che Guevara into Swedish.
