= Lycksele =

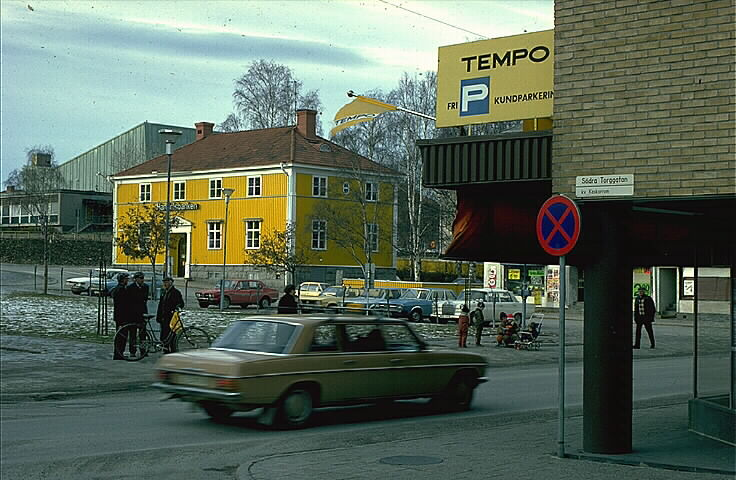
- Late 1970s in Lycksele

- Location within Västerbotten Location within Sweden
- Coordinates: 64°36′N 18°40′E
- Country: Sweden
- Province: Lapland
- County: Västerbotten County
- Municipality: Lycksele Municipality

Area
  - Total: 8.53 km^{2} (3.29 sq mi)

Population (31 December 2010)
  - Total: 8,513
  - Density: 998/km^{2} (2,580/sq mi)
- Time zone: UTC+1 (CET)
  - Summer (DST): UTC+2 (CEST)

Lycksele (Swedish: [ˈlʏ̌kːsɛlɛ]; Southern Sami: Liksjoe; Ume Sami: Likssjuo) is a locality and the seat of Lycksele Municipality in Västerbotten County, province of Lapland, Sweden with 8,513 inhabitants in 2010.

== History ==
Until the 1600s there were no settled communities in southern Lapland. The area was used as grazing land by the forest Sami but had no permanent population. As the Swedish government sought to strengthen its position, the need for permanent meeting places arose. Churches and marketplaces were established at these locations, where Sami, traders, and settlers could meet. Additionally, taxes were also collected there.

This took place on a peninsula in the Ume River, upstream from the present city center, at Öhn (now known as Gammplatsen, which had previously served as a major winter settlement for the Sami in the area). Öhn was designated as a church and marketplace in southern Lapland by Charles IX in 1607, and Lycksele thus celebrated its 400th anniversary in 2007.

As the settlement expanded around the church, it became clear that the relatively small peninsula was no longer suitable for further growth. In 1785, the parish assembly decided to build a new church and moved the marketplace to a location known as Heden a bit downstream. In 1926, Lycksele was granted municipal status (Lycksele köping), two years after the section of the railway line between Hällnäs and Storuman was completed. The remaining section to Storuman was finished in 1930. Lycksele was granted city rights in 1946, becoming the first city in Lapland. The town is often referred to as "Lappstockholm" and markets itself as "the city in Lapland," highlighting both its status as Lapland's first city and its early importance as a meeting place.

After the arrival of the railway, Lycksele developed into a typical small town with smaller industries and important public institutions such as a hospital, a high school, and a district court. The first Swedish Sami school, Skytteanska skolan, was built here already in 1634.

After a population peak in the 1970s, the town's population declined, but this trend has recently slowed due to the expanding mining industry. However, the town still faces depopulation, although perhaps to a slightly lesser extent than comparable towns in the interior of Norrland. In the year 2000, Lycksele had 8,692 residents. Five years later, the number had decreased to 8,597.

== Sports ==
The following sports clubs are based in Lycksele:

- Betsele IF
- Lycksele IF
- Lycksele SK
- Öråns SK

== Notable people ==
- Eva Björklund, politician
- Elisabeth Svantesson, Minister for finance
- Levi Borgstrom, carver
- Melker Karlsson, ice hockey player
- John Lindgren, cross-country skier
- Figge Norling, actor
- David Rundblad, ice hockey player and Stanley Cup winner
- Maic Sema, football player
- Linn Svahn, cross-country skier
- Andreas Wingerli, ice hockey player

== Climate ==
Lycksele has a subarctic climate (Dfc) with short mild summers and long cold and snowy winters. Despite its extremely northern latitude, the climate is relatively mild compared to other places at similar latitude because of the Gulf Stream.

Climate data for Lycksele (2002–2020 averages; extremes since 1945)
Month	Jan	Feb	Mar	Apr	May	Jun	Jul	Aug	Sep	Oct	Nov	Dec	Year
Record high °C (°F)	9.5 (49.1)	9.9 (49.8)	14.7 (58.5)	20.4 (68.7)	29.0 (84.2)	31.9 (89.4)	33.2 (91.8)	30.9 (87.6)	26.2 (79.2)	21.6 (70.9)	13.0 (55.4)	9.2 (48.6)	33.2 (91.8)
Mean maximum °C (°F)	3.9 (39.0)	5.1 (41.2)	8.9 (48.0)	15.2 (59.4)	23.9 (75.0)	26.8 (80.2)	28.4 (83.1)	26.4 (79.5)	20.5 (68.9)	13.1 (55.6)	7.2 (45.0)	4.9 (40.8)	29.5 (85.1)
Mean daily maximum °C (°F)	−5.7 (21.7)	−4.0 (24.8)	1.2 (34.2)	7.2 (45.0)	14.0 (57.2)	18.8 (65.8)	21.6 (70.9)	19.4 (66.9)	13.7 (56.7)	5.7 (42.3)	−0.4 (31.3)	−3.1 (26.4)	7.4 (45.3)
Daily mean °C (°F)	−10.7 (12.7)	−9.5 (14.9)	−4.6 (23.7)	1.7 (35.1)	7.6 (45.7)	12.6 (54.7)	15.5 (59.9)	14.6 (58.3)	8.7 (47.7)	1.9 (35.4)	−3.9 (25.0)	−7.6 (18.3)	2.2 (35.9)
Mean daily minimum °C (°F)	−15.7 (3.7)	−15.0 (5.0)	−10.4 (13.3)	−3.9 (25.0)	1.1 (34.0)	6.4 (43.5)	9.4 (48.9)	7.7 (45.9)	3.6 (38.5)	−1.9 (28.6)	−7.4 (18.7)	−12.0 (10.4)	−3.2 (26.3)
Mean minimum °C (°F)	−31.5 (−24.7)	−30.7 (−23.3)	−25.7 (−14.3)	−13.3 (8.1)	−5.7 (21.7)	−1.0 (30.2)	1.9 (35.4)	−0.2 (31.6)	−3.8 (25.2)	−13.2 (8.2)	−20.1 (−4.2)	−26.7 (−16.1)	−34.5 (−30.1)
Record low °C (°F)	−43.0 (−45.4)	−41.0 (−41.8)	−37.2 (−35.0)	−25.6 (−14.1)	−12.3 (9.9)	−4.2 (24.4)	−1.1 (30.0)	−4.6 (23.7)	−8.9 (16.0)	−25.0 (−13.0)	−33.2 (−27.8)	−39.1 (−38.4)	−43.0 (−45.4)
Average precipitation mm (inches)	29.3 (1.15)	21.8 (0.86)	19.4 (0.76)	23.3 (0.92)	39.1 (1.54)	53.3 (2.10)	76.6 (3.02)	71.2 (2.80)	53.6 (2.11)	43.5 (1.71)	32.7 (1.29)	38.9 (1.53)	502.7 (19.79)
Source 1: SMHI Open Data
Source 2: SMHI climate data 2002–2020

== See also ==
- Blue Highway, an international tourist route
