= Swedish–Cuban Association =

Sweden-based organization supporting strengthened political ties with Cuba

The Swedish–Cuban Association (Swedish: Svensk–kubanska föreningen) is a Sweden-based organization supporting strengthened political ties between Sweden and Cuba. The Swedish–Cuban Association presents itself as a "politically unrestricted friendship association" with the objective of "supporting the socialist revolution on Cuba and the Cuban people's struggle against imperialism and promoting contacts and cooperation between the Swedish and the Cuban people".

The association has departments in various towns around Sweden. The national board, consisting of representatives for the local work, the board's working committees and the association's secretariat with förbundssekreterare, carries out the central work. The chairman of the association is Martin Österlin.

The Swedish–Cuban Association publishes the paper Kuba whose editor and responsible publisher is Eva Björklund, alternate national board member of the Swedish Left Party. Several other conductive members of the Left Party are current or former members of the organization, among them the party leader Lars Ohly. He declared in September 2005 that he was leaving the association, saying that he was not interested in being a lasting member in an organization which "slavishly follows what the Cuban regime says".
