= Levi Borgstrom =

Swedish-New Zealand carver

- Born: Levi Petrus Borgstrom; 7 November 1919; Lycksele, Sweden
- Died: 25 July 2001 (aged 81); Titirangi, New Zealand
- Known for: Woodturning, carving

Levi Petrus Borgstrom (7 November 1919 – 25 July 2001) was a Swedish-New Zealand carver.

== Early life ==
Borgstrom was born in Lycksele, Sweden in 1919. As a teenager, he began using his father's tools to carve wooden cutlery and crockery and was strongly influenced by Saami and Norrland settler culture. His career was largely focused upon spoon carving.

== Career ==
In 1951, he moved to New Zealand and began incorporating New Zealand resources into his Scandinavian-influenced works. He used New Zealand and introduced timbers in his works, including kōwhai, tānekaha, akeake, rewarewa, mānuka, macrocarpa, cherry wood, privet, mangrove, and silky oak.

Borgstrom worked by drawing a design on a piece of wood and roughly creating the shape using a Scandinavian bow saw. He would then use knives and chisels to further refine the carving, followed by work with files and rasps. The final stages of creating a spoon included sanding, waxing and oiling.

== Collections ==
His work is held in the collection of the Auckland War Memorial Museum and the Powerhouse Museum in Sydney, Australia.
