= Brian Elliott =

Canadian ice hockey player (born 1985)

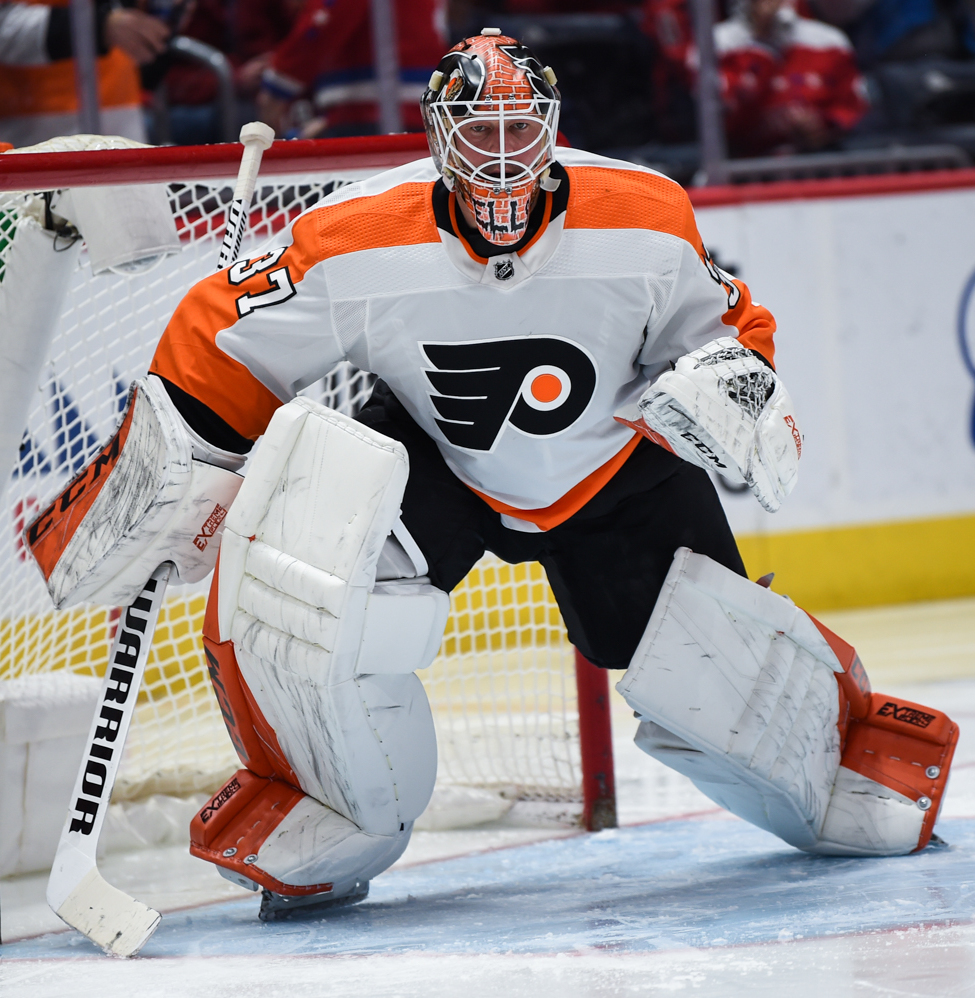
- Elliott with the Philadelphia Flyers in 2020
- Born: April 9, 1985 (age 41) Newmarket, Ontario, Canada
- Height: 6 ft 2 in (188 cm)
- Weight: 198 lb (90 kg; 14 st 2 lb)
- Position: Goaltender
- Caught: Left
- Played for: Ottawa Senators; Colorado Avalanche; St. Louis Blues; Calgary Flames; Philadelphia Flyers; Tampa Bay Lightning
- NHL draft: 291st overall, 2003; Ottawa Senators
- Playing career: 2006–2023

Brian Elliott (born April 9, 1985) is a Canadian former professional ice hockey goaltender who played parts of 16 seasons in the National Hockey League (NHL). He was drafted by the Ottawa Senators in the ninth round, 291st overall, of the 2003 NHL entry draft. A two-time NHL All-Star in 2012 and 2015, Elliott played in the NHL for the Senators, Colorado Avalanche, St. Louis Blues, Calgary Flames, Philadelphia Flyers, and Tampa Bay Lightning.

== Playing career ==
=== Junior ===
Elliott grew up in Newmarket, Ontario, playing minor hockey for the Newmarket Redmen AA and the York-Simcoe Express AAA teams in the Ontario Minor Hockey Association. Elliott was not drafted by an Ontario Hockey League (OHL) team in 2001 and returned to York-Simcoe for Major Midget the following season. After a solid season in the Eastern AAA Hockey League, Elliott was signed by the Ajax Axemen of the Ontario Provincial Junior A Hockey League in 2002–03.

=== NCAA ===
After a standout season with the Ajax Axemen in 2002–03, Elliott was drafted in the ninth round, 291st overall, in the 2003 NHL entry draft by the Ottawa Senators. The second-last player selected in the draft, Elliott was not expected to progress to the NHL. After being drafted, he would spend four seasons with the University of Wisconsin–Madison, serving as a backup for his first two seasons before securing the starting goaltender position in the 2005–06 season. For his efforts, he was selected as a finalist for the 2005–06 Hobey Baker Memorial Award, collecting eight shutouts in 33 appearances, and leading the Badgers to the 2006 NCAA National Championship. He was then signed by the American Hockey League (AHL)'s Binghamton Senators – an affiliate of the Ottawa Senators – on March 23, 2007, and played in eight games with Binghamton near the end of the 2006–07 season.

=== Professional ===
==== Ottawa Senators ====
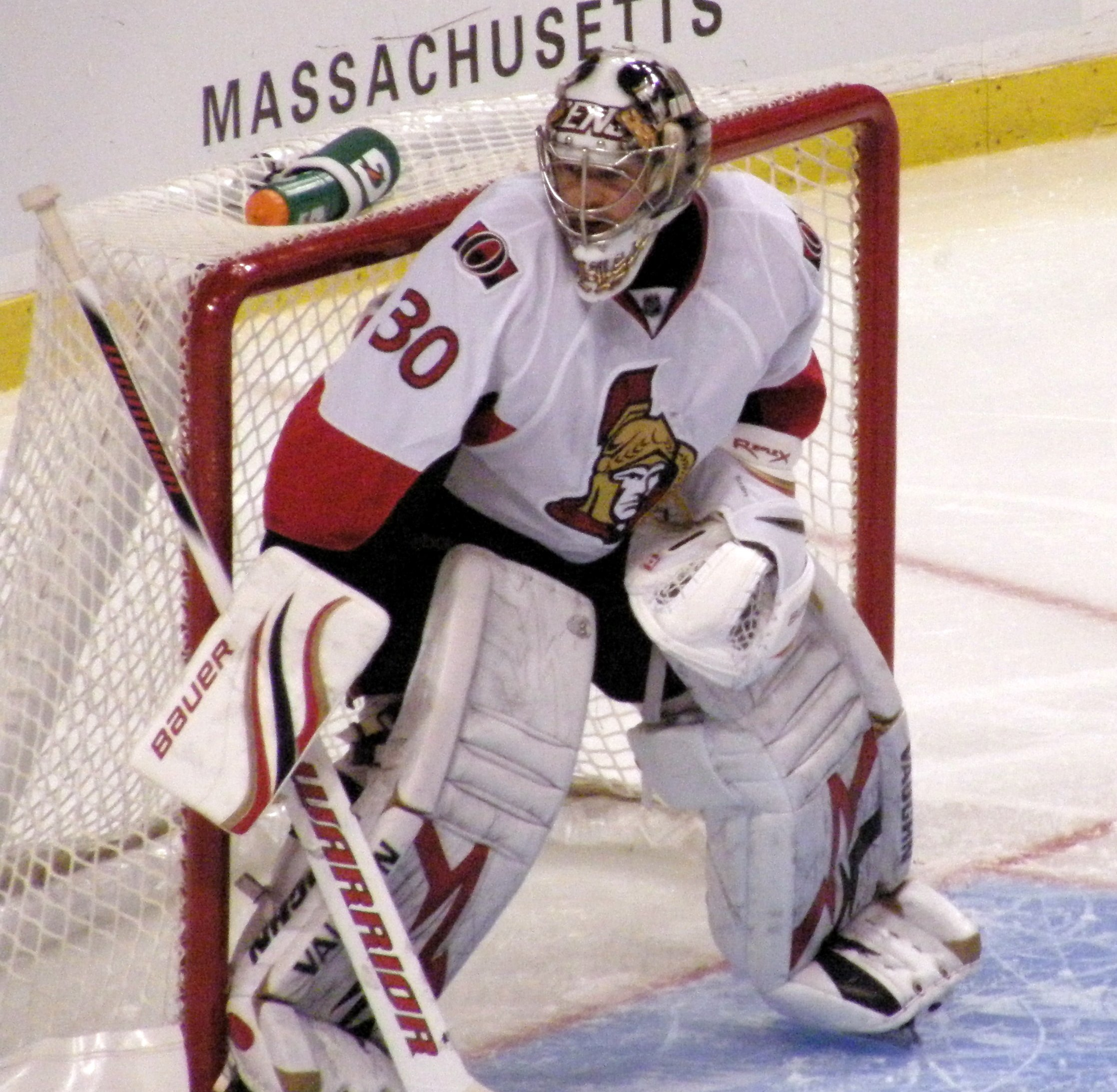
Elliott in goal during his tenure with Ottawa.

Elliott was invited to the Ottawa Senators' 2007–08 training camp, but was ultimately assigned to Binghamton on September 25, 2007. He was recalled to Ottawa four days later to back up Martin Gerber, as starting goaltender Ray Emery was recovering from wrist surgery. On October 10, Elliott played in his first NHL game and earned the win against the Atlanta Thrashers. Upon Emery's return, Elliott was sent back to Binghamton, where he played in 44 games that season.

On January 9, 2009, Elliott was recalled by Ottawa after being named the AHL's Goalie of the Month for December. He had been a standout in Binghamton, posting an 18–8–1 record with a 2.31 goals against average (GAA) and .926 save percentage. His play earned him the starting position for the Canadian team in the 2009 AHL All-Star Game.

Elliott made an immediate impact in Ottawa. The team had struggled all season, with inconsistent goaltending being an issue. Craig Hartsburg, Ottawa's head coach at the time, said of the move, "We need some saves, some big saves, and he's done it down there [in Binghamton]." Elliott would finish the season in Ottawa, sharing goaltending duties with veteran Alex Auld. Elliott's emergence effectively made Martin Gerber expendable to the team, and he would later be claimed on waivers by the Toronto Maple Leafs.

Elliott was nominated for the NHL's Rookie of the Month award for March 2009, though he would lose out to St. Louis Blues forward T. J. Oshie. In January 2010, he was awarded the NHL's First Star of the Week for January 18–24, and named the League's Second Star of the Week for January 25–31.

==== Colorado Avalanche ====
Prior to the trade deadline of the 2010–11 season, Elliott was traded as a part of Ottawa's rebuilding process to the Colorado Avalanche on February 18, 2011, in exchange for goaltender Craig Anderson.

After winning just two of his 12 starts with the Avalanche, combined with a sub-par 3.83 GAA, Elliott was released as a free agent after Colorado declined his qualifying offer.

==== St. Louis Blues ====
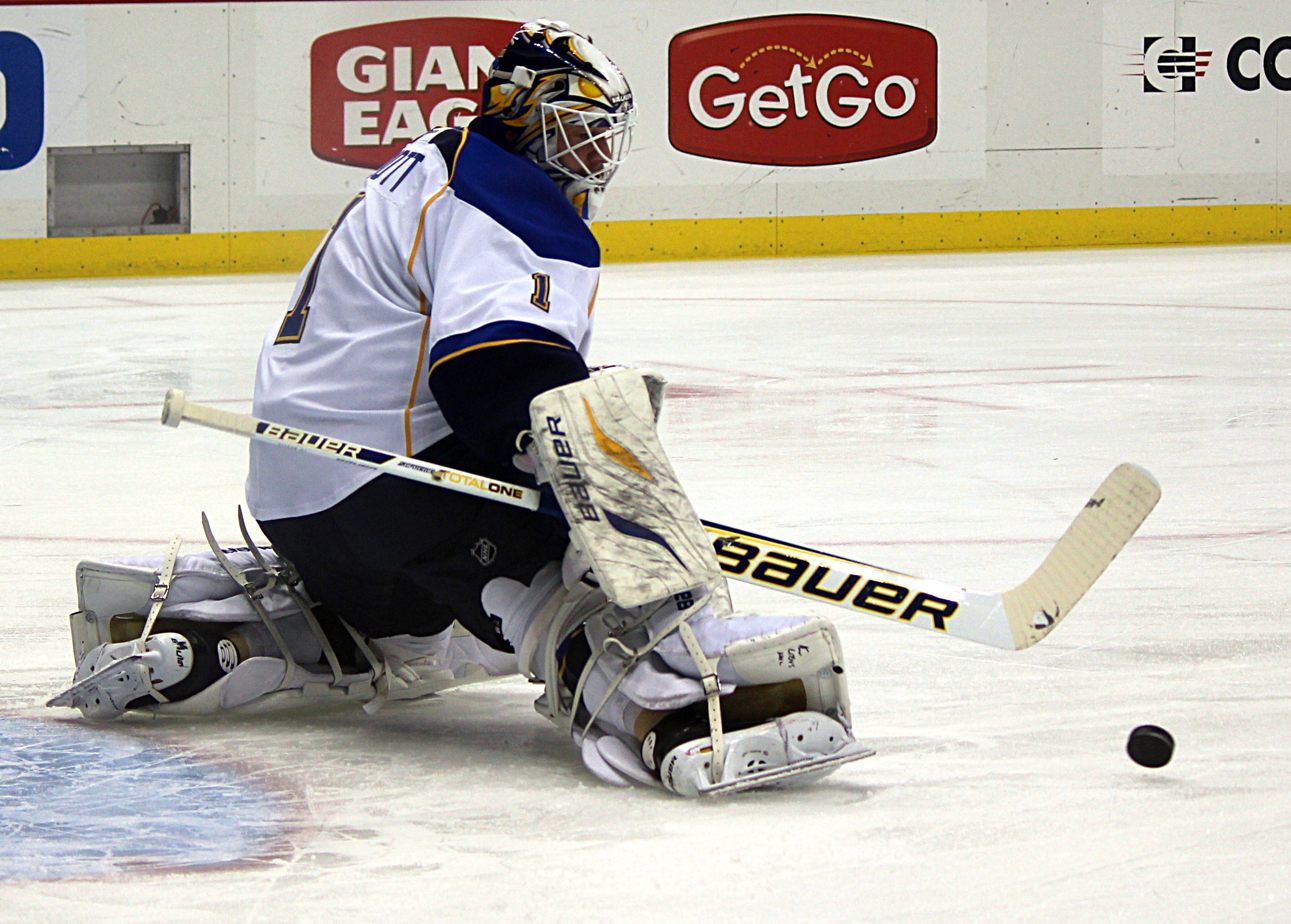
Elliott playing for the Blues in 2014.

Elliott signed a one-year contract worth $600,000 with the St. Louis Blues on July 1, 2011. Forming a formidable goaltending tandem with Jaroslav Halák, Elliott revitalized his career, posting a 23–10–4 record while sporting a 1.56 GAA. He was also chosen to participate in the 2012 NHL All-Star Game in Ottawa.

On January 18, 2012, Elliott signed a two-year contract extension with the Blues. The deal carried an average annual value of $1.8 million. Elliott reportedly earned $1.7 million in 2012–13 and $1.9 million in 2013–14. After taking over for the injured Halák during the first round of the 2012 Stanley Cup playoffs, Elliott led the Blues to a series victory over the San Jose Sharks before ultimately being swept in round two by the eventual Stanley Cup champions, the Los Angeles Kings.

On May 19, 2014, Elliott signed a three-year contract extension to remain in St. Louis. The deal has an average annual value of $2.5 million. On January 22, 2015, Elliott was named to the 2015 NHL All-Star Game in Columbus, replacing Columbus Blue Jackets' goaltender Sergei Bobrovsky, who pulled out due to injury.

On March 12, 2015, Elliott tied Jaroslav Halák for the Blues' franchise record in shutouts. Five days later, on March 17, Elliott surpassed Halák for the Blues' shutout franchise record.

A 23–8–6 record during the 2015–16 NHL season earned Elliott the starting role for the Blues for the 2016 Stanley Cup playoffs. He led the Blues to a first round victory over the defending Stanley Cup champion Chicago Blackhawks. He made 31 saves in the deciding Game 7 victory on April 25. Elliott and the Blues would then move on to face the Western Conference's top overall team, the Dallas Stars. Again, the Blues prevailed in seven games. Elliott's only faltering occurred in Game 6 of the series, when he was pulled in favor of Jake Allen after allowing three goals on seven shots. He rebounded the next game, making 31 saves in a decisive 6–1 victory that propelled St. Louis to the Western Conference Finals for the first time since 2001 where they lost to the San Jose Sharks. Elliott started in all but two games in the 2016 playoffs (games 4 and 5 of the Western Conference Finals).

==== Calgary Flames ====
During the 2016 NHL entry draft, Elliott was traded by the Blues to the Calgary Flames in exchange for a 2016 second-round pick (Jordan Kyrou) and a 2018 conditional third-round pick on June 24, 2016. On October 24, 2016, he won his first game as a Flame against Chicago in a shootout. However, he struggled with the team early, prompting them to switch to Chad Johnson as the team's regular starter. Elliott regained the starting job after starting the season off 3–9–1 with a 3.31 GAA and a save percentage of .885. On June 17, 2017, GM Brad Treliving informed Elliott that he will not be returning to the team for the 2017–18 season.

==== Philadelphia Flyers ====
On July 1, 2017, Elliott officially signed a two-year, $5.5 million contract with the Philadelphia Flyers. During the 2017–18 season, Elliott was named the third star of the week for the week of December 17 after he helped the Flyers earn six consecutive wins following a losing streak of 10 games. Despite missing a few months due to injury, the Flyers qualified for the 2018 Stanley Cup playoffs. Elliott was replaced during their series against the Pittsburgh Penguins and the Flyers lost in the first round 4 games to 2.

On June 26, 2019, Elliott re-signed with the Flyers, signing a one-year contract worth $2 million.

On October 3, 2020, the Flyers re-signed Elliott to a one-year contract extension worth $1.5 million.

On May 4, 2021, Elliott played his 500th game in the NHL, the 77th goaltender to do so.

==== Tampa Bay Lightning ====
On July 28, 2021, Elliott was signed as a free agent to a one-year, $900,000 contract with the Tampa Bay Lightning.

The Lightning placed Elliott and Andrei Vasilevskiy, their two regular goalies, into the NHL Covid protocol on December 26, 2021. Elliott was the first one eligible to exit the Covid-protocol on December 31. He played that night against the New York Rangers, his third start of the season. He allowed 3 goals on 23 shots, and the game eventually went into a shootout. Elliott gave up the only goal in the shootout to Mika Zibanejad, which was enough to earn New York a 4–3 win.

== Post-playing career ==
After spending the 2023–24 season unsigned, Elliott returned to the St. Louis Blues as a goaltending scout and development coach on June 17, 2024, marking the end of his playing career.

== Personal life ==
While attending Newmarket High School, he took the school's boys hockey team to the championship, winning it in 2000. He also attended Newmarket High School with former Blues teammate B. J. Crombeen.

Elliott's father, Bill, is a television director who has worked on numerous Canadian television programs, including The Red Green Show. He resides in Wisconsin during the off-season. Elliott has one brother named Dan.

Elliott was taught the art of moose calling by the late Owen Scott, a champion moose caller. He paid tribute to Scott with a moose painted on the back of his goaltender mask. Due to this, his nickname among teammates is "Moose." Elliott also had Casey Jones from Teenage Mutant Ninja Turtles painted on his mask.

During the 2015–16 NHL season, Elliott began wearing all blue pads as a tribute to former Blues goaltender Curtis Joseph, and also had his mask painted with the same design that Joseph wore.

Elliott's wife, Amanda, enrolled in the University of Wisconsin's Reserve Officers' Training Corps (ROTC) before commissioning as an intelligence officer in the United States Air Force. The couple have three sons together.

== Career statistics ==
			Regular season										Playoffs
Season	Team	League	GP	W	L	T	OTL	MIN	GA	SO	GAA	SV%	GP	W	L	MIN	GA	SO	GAA	SV%
2002–03	Ajax Axemen	OPJHL	39	—	—	—	—	2097	135	0	3.86	.903	4	—	—	—	—	—	3.62	—
2003–04	University of Wisconsin–Madison	WCHA	6	3	3	0	—	336	12	0	2.14	.912	—	—	—	—	—	—	—	—
2004–05	University of Wisconsin–Madison	WCHA	9	6	2	1	—	467	9	3	1.16	.945	—	—	—	—	—	—	—	—
2005–06	University of Wisconsin–Madison	WCHA	33	25	5	3	—	2008	52	8	1.55	.938	—	—	—	—	—	—	—	—
2006–07	University of Wisconsin–Madison	WCHA	36	15	17	2	—	2053	72	5	2.10	.923	—	—	—	—	—	—	—	—
2006–07	Binghamton Senators	AHL	8	3	4	—	0	425	30	0	4.24	.886	—	—	—	—	—	—	—	—
2007–08	Ottawa Senators	NHL	1	1	0	—	0	60	1	0	1.01	.966	—	—	—	—	—	—	—	—
2007–08	Binghamton Senators	AHL	44	18	19	—	1	2394	112	2	2.81	.915	—	—	—	—	—	—	—	—
2008–09	Binghamton Senators	AHL	30	18	8	—	1	1691	65	2	2.31	.926	—	—	—	—	—	—	—	—
2008–09	Ottawa Senators	NHL	31	16	8	—	3	1667	77	1	2.77	.902	—	—	—	—	—	—	—	—
2009–10	Ottawa Senators	NHL	55	29	18	—	4	3038	130	5	2.57	.909	4	1	2	203	14	0	4.14	.853
2010–11	Ottawa Senators	NHL	43	13	19	—	8	2293	122	3	3.19	.894	—	—	—	—	—	—	—	—
2010–11	Colorado Avalanche	NHL	12	2	8	—	1	690	44	0	3.83	.891	—	—	—	—	—	—	—	—
2011–12	St. Louis Blues	NHL	38	23	10	—	4	2235	58	9	1.56	.940	8	3	4	455	18	0	2.37	.904
2012–13	St. Louis Blues	NHL	24	14	8	—	1	1292	49	3	2.28	.907	6	2	4	378	12	0	1.90	.919
2012–13	Peoria Rivermen	AHL	2	1	1	—	0	119	3	1	1.51	.946	—	—	—	—	—	—	—	—
2013–14	St. Louis Blues	NHL	31	18	6	—	2	1624	53	4	1.96	.922	—	—	—	—	—	—	—	—
2014–15	St. Louis Blues	NHL	46	26	14	—	3	2546	96	5	2.26	.917	1	0	0	26	1	0	2.31	.857
2015–16	St. Louis Blues	NHL	42	23	8	—	6	2263	78	4	2.07	.930	18	9	9	1058	43	1	2.44	.921
2016–17	Calgary Flames	NHL	49	26	18	—	3	2845	121	2	2.55	.910	4	0	3	185	12	0	3.89	.880
2017–18	Philadelphia Flyers	NHL	43	23	11	—	7	2522	112	1	2.66	.909	4	1	3	178	14	0	4.75	.856
2018–19	Philadelphia Flyers	NHL	26	11	11	—	1	1397	69	1	2.96	.907	—	—	—	—	—	—	—	—
2018–19	Lehigh Valley Phantoms	AHL	2	1	1	—	0	121	7	0	3.47	.877	—	—	—	—	—	—	—	—
2019–20	Philadelphia Flyers	NHL	31	16	7	—	4	1674	80	2	2.87	.899	3	1	1	140	5	0	2.15	.911
2020–21	Philadelphia Flyers	NHL	30	15	9	—	2	1608	82	2	3.06	.889	—	—	—	—	—	—	—	—
2021–22	Tampa Bay Lightning	NHL	19	11	4	—	3	1064	43	1	2.43	.912	—	—	—	—	—	—	—	—
2022–23	Tampa Bay Lightning	NHL	22	12	8	—	2	1325	75	2	3.40	.891	—	—	—	—	—	—	—	—
NHL totals			543	279	167	—	54	30,141	1,290	45	2.57	.909	48	17	26	2,622	119	1	2.72	.904

== Awards and achievements ==
Award	Year
College
All-WCHA Second Team	2005–06
AHCA West First-Team All-American	2005–06
All-NCAA All-Tournament Team	2006
All-WCHA Second Team	2006–07
NHL
William M. Jennings Trophy	2011–12
All-Star Game	2012, 2015
Lowest GAA (1.56)	2011–12

Awards and achievements
Preceded by Roberto Luongo; Cory Schneider	Winner of the William M. Jennings Trophy (with Jaroslav Halák); 2011–12	Succeeded by Corey Crawford; Ray Emery
