= Öråns SK =

Sports club in Lycksele, Sweden

- Full name: Öråns sportklubb
- Sport: badminton, table tennis, track and field athletics, floorball, skiing
- Founded: 1970
- Based in: Lycksele, Sweden

Öråns SK is a sports club in Lycksele, Sweden. Established in 1970, The club won the Swedish national women's table tennis team championship during the season of 1998-1999.
