= Melker Karlsson =

Swedish ice hockey player (born 1990)

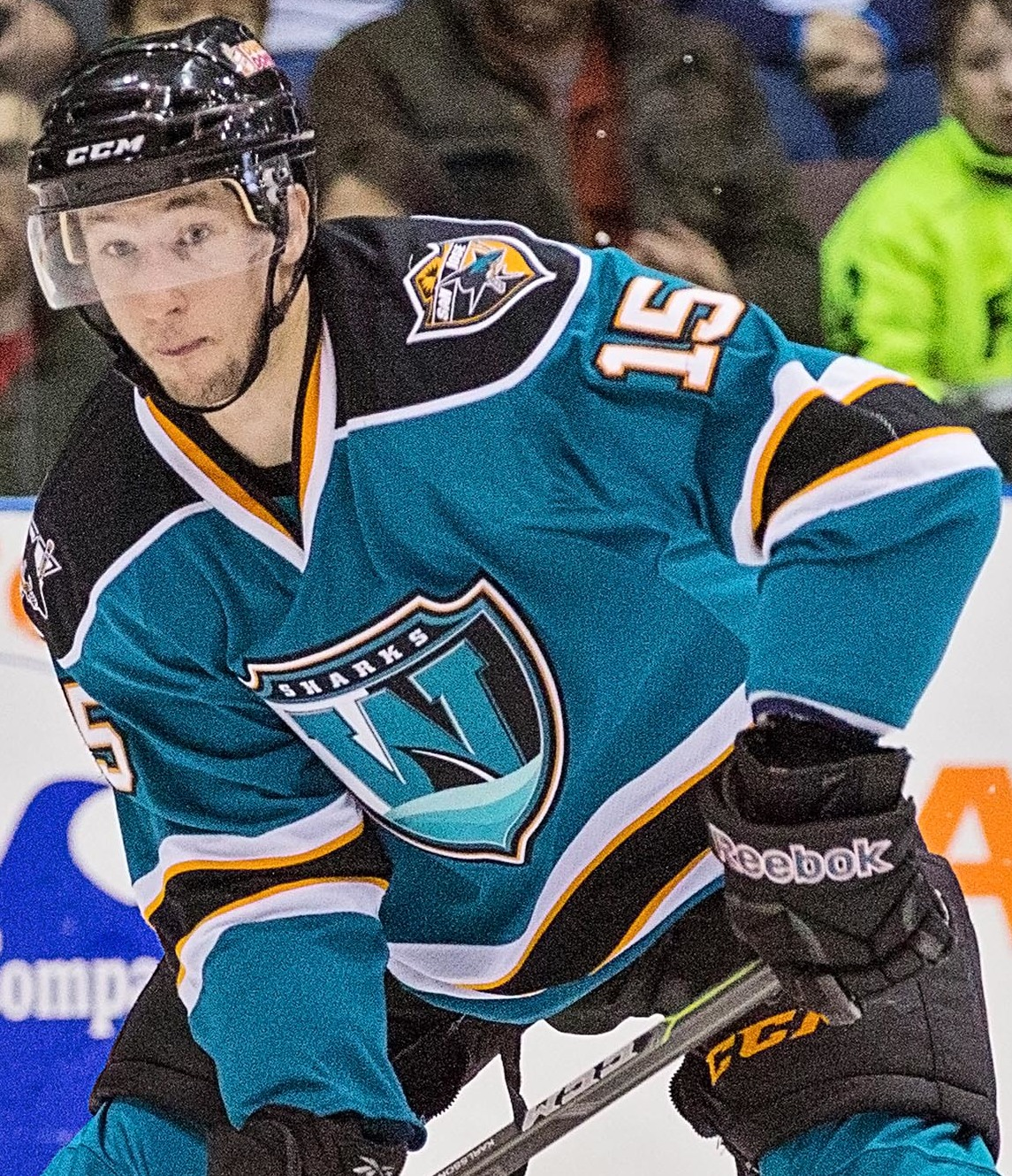
- Karlsson with the Worcester Sharks in 2014
- Born: 18 July 1990 (age 36) Lycksele, Sweden
- Height: 6 ft 0 in (183 cm)
- Weight: 180 lb (82 kg; 12 st 12 lb)
- Position: Right wing
- Shoots: Right
- SHL team Former teams: Skellefteå AIK; San Jose Sharks
- NHL draft: Undrafted
- Playing career: 2009–present

Melker Karlsson (born 18 July 1990), nicknamed the Melkman, is a Swedish professional ice hockey winger who is currently playing for Skellefteå AIK of the Swedish Hockey League (SHL). He previously played for the San Jose Sharks of the National Hockey League (NHL). During Karlsson's first tenure with Skellefteå AIK, he was a two-time Le Mat Trophy champion, winning the Swedish Championship in 2013 and 2014.

== Playing career ==
On 30 May 2014, Karlsson signed a one-year contract with the San Jose Sharks.

After beginning the subsequent season with the Worcester Sharks of the American Hockey League, on 9 December 2014, it was announced that Karlsson would make his NHL debut that night in a game against the Edmonton Oilers. Karlsson scored his first NHL goal on 22 December 2014, against Frederik Andersen of the Anaheim Ducks.

On 12 May 2017, it was announced the Sharks had re-signed Karlsson to a three-year, $6 million contract.

As a free agent from the Sharks after six-seasons with the club, Karlsson remained un-signed into the 2020–21 season, as the North American season was delayed due to the COVID-19 pandemic. On 15 December 2020, Karlsson opted to remain in his native Sweden, returning to his original club, Skellefteå AIK of the SHL, for the remainder of the season.

== Career statistics ==
			Regular season					Playoffs
Season	Team	League	GP	G	A	Pts	PIM	GP	G	A	Pts	PIM
2005–06	Lycksele SK	SWE.4	9	1	2	3	0	—	—	—	—	—
2006–07	Skellefteå AIK	J18 Allsv	14	5	4	9	20	—	—	—	—	—
2006–07	Skellefteå AIK	J20	1	0	0	0	0	—	—	—	—	—
2007–08	Skellefteå AIK	J18	16	10	8	18	4	—	—	—	—	—
2007–08	Skellefteå AIK	J18 Allsv	14	11	5	16	16	—	—	—	—	—
2007–08	Skellefteå AIK	J20	9	4	2	6	0	2	1	0	1	0
2008–09	Skellefteå AIK	J20	34	10	14	24	58	6	1	3	4	2
2008–09	Skellefteå AIK	SEL	4	0	0	0	0	1	0	0	0	0
2009–10	Skellefteå AIK	J20	27	14	21	35	10	2	1	1	2	0
2009–10	Skellefteå AIK	SEL	36	2	0	2	8	8	0	2	2	0
2010–11	Skellefteå AIK	J20	5	3	1	4	0	—	—	—	—	—
2010–11	Skellefteå AIK	SEL	40	4	2	6	2	16	1	3	4	2
2010–11	Örebro HK	Allsv	10	2	4	6	12	—	—	—	—	—
2011–12	Skellefteå AIK	SEL	44	3	2	5	8	19	2	2	4	4
2012–13	Skellefteå AIK	SEL	44	13	15	28	14	13	2	8	10	10
2013–14	Skellefteå AIK	SHL	48	9	16	25	14	14	4	8	12	12
2014–15	Worcester Sharks	AHL	20	5	5	10	6	—	—	—	—	—
2014–15	San Jose Sharks	NHL	53	13	11	24	20	—	—	—	—	—
2015–16	Worcester Sharks	AHL	4	0	2	2	0	—	—	—	—	—
2015–16	San Jose Sharks	NHL	65	10	9	19	16	24	5	3	8	10
2016–17	San Jose Sharks	NHL	67	11	11	22	22	6	1	0	1	6
2017–18	San Jose Sharks	NHL	71	8	11	19	26	10	0	3	3	2
2018–19	San Jose Sharks	NHL	79	12	4	16	26	20	0	2	2	4
2019–20	San Jose Sharks	NHL	61	6	6	12	20	—	—	—	—	—
SHL totals			256	42	42	84	84	71	9	23	32	28
NHL totals			396	60	52	112	130	60	6	8	14	22
