= Victor Rydberg =

Victor Rydberg may refer to:

- Viktor Rydberg (1828–1895), Swedish writer and a member of the Swedish Academy
- Victor Crus Rydberg (born 1995), Swedish ice hockey player
