= 2013–14 OHL season =

- League: Ontario Hockey League
- Sport: Hockey
- Duration: Preseason; August 2013 – September 2013; Regular season September 19, 2013 – March 17, 2014; Playoffs; March 20, 2014 – May 9, 2014
- Teams: 20
- TV partner(s): Rogers TV, TVCogeco, Shaw TV

Draft
- Top draft pick: Travis Konecny
- Picked by: Ottawa 67's

Regular season
- Hamilton Spectator Trophy: Guelph Storm (4)
- Season MVP: Connor Brown (Erie Otters)
- Top scorer: Connor Brown (Erie Otters)

Playoffs
- Playoffs MVP: Robby Fabbri (Storm)
- Finals champions: Guelph Storm (3)
- Runners-up: North Bay Battalion

OHL seasons
- 2012–13 2014–15

2013–14 CHL season
- League: Canadian Hockey League
- Sport: Hockey
- Duration: OHL; September 19, 2013 – March 17, 2014; QMJHL; September 2013 – March 2014; WHL; September 2013 – March 2014
- Teams: 60
- TV partner(s): RDS; Rogers Sportsnet; Rogers TV; Shaw TV
- Season MVP: Anthony Mantha (Val-d'Or Foreurs) (QMHL)
- Top scorer: Connor Brown (Erie Otters) (OHL)

Memorial Cup
- Finals champions: Edmonton Oil Kings (WHL)
- Runners-up: Guelph Storm (OHL)

The 2013–14 OHL season was the 34th season of the Ontario Hockey League. The Brampton Battalion relocated to North Bay and became the North Bay Battalion, playing at the North Bay Memorial Gardens. The first two outdoor games in OHL history were held this season, when the Saginaw Spirit, Windsor Spitfires, Plymouth Whalers, and London Knights played at Comerica Park in Detroit, Michigan as part of the Hockeytown Winter Festival on December 29. On March 11, 2014 Terry Trafford of the Saginaw Spirit, who had been missing for eight days, was found dead in his vehicle at a Wal-Mart in Saginaw, Michigan. His death was ruled a suicide as a result of self-inflicted asphyxiation. Twenty teams played 68 games each according to the regular season schedule, from September 19, 2013 to March 17, 2014. The Guelph Storm won the J. Ross Robertson Cup for the third time in franchise history, and the first time since 2004, as they defeated the North Bay Battalion in five games, and represented the OHL at the 2014 Memorial Cup held at Budweiser Gardens in London, Ontario. The London Knights also qualified for the tournament as the host team.

== Regular season ==
=== Final standings ===
Note: DIV = Division; GP = Games played; W = Wins; L = Losses; OTL = Overtime losses; SL = Shootout losses; GF = Goals for; GA = Goals against; PTS = Points; x = clinched playoff berth; y = clinched division title; z = clinched conference title

=== Eastern conference ===
Rank	Team	DIV	GP	W	L	OTL	SL	PTS	GF	GA
1	z-Oshawa Generals	East	68	42	20	0	6	90	232	187
2	y-North Bay Battalion	Central	68	38	24	4	2	82	220	189
3	x-Kingston Frontenacs	East	68	39	23	3	3	84	301	255
4	x-Barrie Colts	Central	68	37	28	1	2	77	266	218
5	x-Sudbury Wolves	Central	68	33	24	3	8	77	219	228
6	x-Peterborough Petes	East	68	32	30	0	6	70	233	269
7	x-Niagara IceDogs	Central	68	24	35	3	6	57	223	284
8	x-Mississauga Steelheads	Central	68	24	38	1	5	54	167	267
9	Belleville Bulls	East	68	23	38	4	3	53	206	285
10	Ottawa 67's	East	68	23	39	3	3	52	222	308

=== Western conference ===
Rank	Team	DIV	GP	W	L	OTL	SL	PTS	GF	GA
1	z-Guelph Storm	Midwest	68	52	12	2	2	108	340	191
2	y-Sault Ste. Marie Greyhounds	West	68	44	17	2	5	95	267	198
3	x-Erie Otters	Midwest	68	52	14	2	0	106	312	170
4	x-London Knights	Midwest	68	49	14	1	4	103	316	203
5	x-Windsor Spitfires	West	68	37	28	3	0	77	251	235
6	x-Saginaw Spirit	West	68	33	30	4	1	71	254	248
7	x-Owen Sound Attack	Midwest	68	31	29	3	5	70	205	237
8	x-Plymouth Whalers	West	68	28	33	0	7	63	187	238
9	Kitchener Rangers	Midwest	68	22	41	2	3	49	200	280
10	Sarnia Sting	West	68	17	44	2	5	41	211	341

=== Scoring leaders ===
Note: GP = Games played; G = Goals; A = Assists; Pts = Points; PIM = Penalty minutes

Player	Team	GP	G	A	Pts	PIM
Connor Brown	Erie Otters	68	45	83	128	22
Dane Fox	Erie Otters	67	64	43	107	122
Scott Kosmachuk	Guelph Storm	68	48	52	100	83
Connor McDavid	Erie Otters	56	28	71	99	20
Andreas Athanasiou	Barrie Colts	66	49	46	95	52
Michael Dal Colle	Oshawa Generals	67	39	56	95	34
Nikolay Goldobin	Sarnia Sting	67	38	56	94	21
Max Domi	London Knights	61	34	59	93	90
Sam Bennett	Kingston Frontenacs	57	36	55	91	118
Sergey Tolchinsky	Sault Ste. Marie Greyhounds	66	31	60	91	22

=== Leading goaltenders ===
Note: GP = Games played; Mins = Minutes played; W = Wins; L = Losses: OTL = Overtime losses; SL = Shootout losses; GA = Goals Allowed; SO = Shutouts; GAA = Goals against average

Player	Team	GP	Mins	W	L	OTL	SL	GA	SO	Sv%	GAA
Oscar Dansk	Erie Otters	42	2405	29	9	1	0	96	6	0.909	2.39
Anthony Stolarz	London Knights	35	1927	25	5	1	1	81	4	0.926	2.52
Jacob Smith	North Bay Battalion	42	2337	23	12	3	1	98	4	0.904	2.52
Daniel Altshuller	Oshawa Generals	52	2907	31	13	0	3	124	2	0.917	2.56
Devin Williams	Erie Otters	31	1682	23	5	1	0	72	5	0.905	2.57
Matt Murray	Sault Ste. Marie Greyhounds	49	2984	32	11	1	5	128	6	0.921	2.57

== Playoffs ==
Conference quarterfinals	Conference semifinals
1	Oshawa	4
8	Mississauga	0
1	Oshawa	4
6	Peterborough	0
2	North Bay	4
7	Niagara	3
Eastern conference
3	Kingston	3
6	Peterborough	4
2	North Bay	4
4	Barrie	2
4	Barrie	4
5	Sudbury	1
Note: Pairings are re-seeded after the first round.
1	Guelph	4
8	Plymouth	1
1	Guelph	4
4	London	1
2	Sault Ste. Marie	4
7	Owen Sound	1
Western conference
3	Erie	4
6	Saginaw	1
2	Sault Ste. Marie	0
3	Erie	4
4	London	4
5	Windsor	0

Conference finals
1	Oshawa	0
2	North Bay	4
1	Guelph	4
3	Erie	1

Finals
E2	North Bay	1
W1	Guelph	4

=== Conference quarterfinals ===
==== Eastern Conference ====
===== (1) Oshawa Generals vs. (8) Mississauga Steelheads =====
March 21	Oshawa Generals	6 – 0	Mississauga Steelheads	General Motors Centre	Recap
19:21 - pp - Josh Sterk (1)		First period	No scoring
9:16 - pp - Michael Dal Colle (1); 14:05 - Hunter Smith (1)		Second period	No scoring
0:41 - pp - Josh Sterk (2); 10:44 - Michael Dal Colle (2); 16:08 - Justice Dundas (1)		Third period	No scoring
Daniel Altshuller (21 saves / 21 shots)		Goalie stats	Spencer Martin (33 saves / 38 shots); Chase Marchand (5 saves / 6 shots)

March 23	Oshawa Generals	3 – 2	OT	Mississauga Steelheads	General Motors Centre	Recap
No scoring		First period		Lucas Venuto (1) - pp - 15:28
15:54 - Bradley Latour (1)		Second period		Brett Foy (1) - 6:38
4:16 - pp - Josh Sterk (3)		Third period		No scoring
6:48 - pp - Cole Cassels (1)		First overtime period		No scoring
Daniel Altshuller (22 saves / 24 shots)		Goalie stats		Spencer Martin (36 saves / 39 shots)

March 25	Mississauga Steelheads	5 – 6	2OT	Oshawa Generals	Hershey Centre	Recap
16:13 - pp - Semyon Babintsev (1)		First period		Cole Cassels (2) - pp - 19:11
5:18 - Austin Gerhart (1); 7:44 - Semyon Babintsev (2)		Second period		Michael Dal Colle (3) - 8:02
9:45 - pp - Lucas Venuto (2); 18:30 - Semyon Babintsev (3)		Third period		Scott Laughton (1) - 0:41; Dylan Smoskowitz (1) - 2:26; Michael Dal Colle (4) - 3:50
No scoring		Second overtime period		Josh Sterk (4) - 11:23
Spencer Martin (58 saves / 64 shots)		Goalie stats		Daniel Altshuller (28 saves / 33 shots)

March 27	Mississauga Steelheads	3 – 4	OT	Oshawa Generals	Hershey Centre	Recap
4:30 - Bryson Cianfrone (1); 14:59 - Josh Burnside (1)		First period		Josh Sterk (5) - 1:38; Michael Dal Colle (5) - pp - 16:45
No scoring		Second period		Scott Laughton (2) - pp - 16:29
18:52 - Semyon Babintsev (4)		Third period		No scoring
No scoring		First overtime period		Hunter Smith (2) - pp - 1:37
Spencer Martin (37 saves / 41 shots)		Goalie stats		Daniel Altshuller (26 saves / 29 shots)

Oshawa wins series 4 – 0

===== (2) North Bay Battalion vs. (7) Niagara IceDogs =====
March 21	North Bay Battalion	4 – 0	Niagara IceDogs	North Bay Memorial Gardens	Recap
No scoring		First period	No scoring
4:11 - pp - Dylan Blujus (1); 4:40 - Connor Jarvis (1); 12:48 - sh - Barclay Goodrow (1); 16:07 - Alexander Henriksson		Second period	No scoring
No scoring		Third period	No scoring
Jacob Smith (28 saves / 28 shots)		Goalie stats	Brent Moran (23 saves / 27 shots)

March 23	North Bay Battalion	2 – 3	Niagara IceDogs	North Bay Memorial Gardens	Recap
No scoring		First period	Jordan Maletta (1) - 0:39
No scoring		Second period	Anthony DiFruscia (1) - 14:53
3:53 - Nick Paul (1); 4:25 - Brenden Miller (1)		Third period	Carter Verhaeghe (1) - 19:19
Jacob Smith (18 saves / 21 shots)		Goalie stats	Brent Moran (34 saves / 36 shots)

March 25	Niagara IceDogs	2 – 0	North Bay Battalion	Gatorade Garden City Complex	Recap
No scoring		First period	No scoring
No scoring		Second period	No scoring
13:11 - Billy Jenkins (1); 19:55 - en - Eric Ming (1)		Third period	No scoring
Brent Moran (42 saves / 42 shots)		Goalie stats	Jacob Smith (24 saves / 25 shots)

March 27	Niagara IceDogs	5 – 3	North Bay Battalion	Gatorade Garden City Complex	Recap
12:31 - Mitchell Fitzmorris (1)		First period	Nick Paul (2) - 5:10
9:07 - pp - Eric Ming (2); 11:50 - sh - Jordan Maletta (2)		Second period	No scoring
4:00 - Eric Ming (3); 11:46 - Carter Verhaeghe (2)		Third period	Connor Jarvis (2) - 10:19; Kyle Wood (1) - 19:30
Brent Moran (36 saves / 39 shots)		Goalie stats	Jacob Smith (21 saves / 26 shots)

March 28	North Bay Battalion	4 – 3	Niagara IceDogs	North Bay Memorial Gardens	Recap
9:42 - Alex Henriksson (2); 18:03 - Nick Paul (3)		First period	Matt Gillard (1) - 9:21
5:00 - Alex Henriksson (3)		Second period	Matt Gillard (2) - 17:07
3:35 - Nick Paul (4)		Third period	Blake Siebenaler (1) - 11:54
Jacob Smith (10 saves / 13 shots)		Goalie stats	Brent Moran (32 saves / 36 shots)

March 30	Niagara IceDogs	1 – 5	North Bay Battalion	Gatorade Garden City Complex	Recap
No scoring		First period	Dylan Blujus (2) - pp - 4:19; Barclay Goodrow (2) - 13:30
13:10 - Matt Gillard (3)		Second period	Michael Amadio (1) - 17:21
No scoring		Third period	Michael Amadio (2) - 15:41; Brett McKenzie (1) - 16:51
Brent Moran (34 saves / 39 shots)		Goalie stats	Jacob Smith (22 saves / 23 shots)

April 1	North Bay Battalion	2 – 1	Niagara IceDogs	North Bay Memorial Gardens	Recap
No scoring		First period	Eric Ming (4) - 18:25
No scoring		Second period	No scoring
6:05 - Alex Henriksson (4); 9:50 - Nick Paul (5)		Third period	No scoring
Jacob Smith (16 saves / 17 shots)		Goalie stats	Brent Moran (32 saves / 34 shots)

North Bay wins series 4 – 3

===== (3) Kingston Frontenacs vs. (6) Peterborough Petes =====
March 21	Kingston Frontenacs	4 – 1	Peterborough Petes	Rogers K-Rock Centre	Recap
6:30 - Corey Pawley (1); 9:01 - Darcy Greenaway (1)		First period	No scoring
9:26 - Henri Ikonen (1)		Second period	Greg Betzold (1) - 15:51
18:56 - Sam Schutt (1)		Third period	No scoring
Matt Mahalak (28 saves / 29 shots)		Goalie stats	Andrew D'Agostini (41 saves / 45 shots)

March 23	Kingston Frontenacs	5 – 4	OT	Peterborough Petes	Rogers K-Rock Centre	Recap
2:41 - Robert Polesello (1); 14:13 - Ryan Kujawinski (1)		First period		Michael Clarke (1) - 0:31; Greg Betzold (2) - 19:55
No scoring		Second period		Eric Cornel (1) - 10:37
0:22 - Sam Bennett (1); 19:11 - Robert Polesello (2)		Third period		Eric Cornel (2) - 9:55
8:27 - pp - Roland McKeown (1)		First overtime period		No scoring
Matt Mahalak (25 saves / 29 shots)		Goalie stats		Andrew D'Agostini (39 saves / 44 shots)

March 25	Peterborough Petes	2 – 4	Kingston Frontenacs	Peterborough Memorial Centre	Recap
12:52 - pp - Nick Ritchie (1)		First period	Mike Moffat (1) - pp - 16:20; Samuel Schutt (2) - 19:05
6:35 - Steven Lorentz (1)		Second period	Samuel Schutt (3) - 5:39
No scoring		Third period	Sam Bennett (2) - en - 19:33
Andrew D'Agostini (44 saves / 47 shots)		Goalie stats	Matt Mahalak (43 saves / 45 shots)

March 27	Peterborough Petes	3 – 1	Kingston Frontenacs	Peterborough Memorial Centre	Recap
No scoring		First period	No scoring
19:20 - Steven Lorentz (2)		Second period	No scoring
11:20 - Josh MacDonald (1); 19:42 - en - Hunter Garlent (1)		Third period	Darcy Greenaway (2) - pp - 1:55
Andrew D'Agostini (46 saves / 47 shots)		Goalie stats	Matt Mahalak (37 saves / 39 shots)

March 28	Kingston Frontenacs	5 – 6	OT	Peterborough Petes	Rogers K-Rock Centre	Recap
9:00 - Ryan Verbeek (1); 10:21 - Sam Bennett (3); 13:06 - Spencer Watson (1)		First period		Eric Cornel (3) - 6:13; Josh MacDonald (2) - 16:26; Clark Seymour (1) - pp - 19:07
3:49 - Conor McGlynn (1)		Second period		Stephen Nosad (1) - 16:46
8:04 - pp - Darcy Greenaway (3)		Third period		Nick Ritchie (2) - pp - 4:32
No scoring		First overtime period		Josh MacDonald (3) - 16:15
Matt Mahalak (35 saves / 41 shots)		Goalie stats		Andrew D'Agostini (41 saves / 46 shots)

March 30	Peterborough Petes	5 – 4	Kingston Frontenacs	Peterborough Memorial Centre	Recap
11:22 - sh - Nick Ritchie (3); 12:15 - Eric Cornel (4)		First period	Mike Moffat (2) - pp - 6:30; Mikko Vainonen (1) - pp - 8:44; Sam Bennett (4) - 9:44; Evan McEneny (1) - pp - 16:58
13:47 - Nick Ritchie (4)		Second period	No scoring
12:01 - Matt McCartney (1); 16:17 - Hunter Garlent (2)		Third period	No scoring
Andrew D'Agostini (35 saves / 39 shots)		Goalie stats	Matt Mahalak (3 saves / 5 shots); Lucas Peressini (34 saves / 37 shots)

April 1	Kingston Frontenacs	1 – 2	OT	Peterborough Petes	Rogers K-Rock Centre	Recap
0:59 - Sam Bennett (5)		First period		No scoring
No scoring		Second period		Hunter Garlent (3) - pp - 2:40
No scoring		Third period		No scoring
No scoring		First overtime period		Nick Ritchie (5) - 12:17
Matt Mahalak (31 saves / 33 shots)		Goalie stats		Andrew D'Agostini (39 saves / 40 shots)

Peterborough wins series 4 – 3

===== (4) Barrie Colts vs. (5) Sudbury Wolves =====
March 20	Barrie Colts	3 – 2	Sudbury Wolves	Barrie Molson Centre	Recap
15:11 - Justin Scott (1)		First period	No scoring
2:19 - Kevin Labanc (1); 16:32 - Zach Hall (1)		Second period	Nathan Pancel (1) - pp - 9:26
No scoring		Third period	Nathan Pancel (2) - 6:53
Mackenzie Blackwood (29 saves / 31 shots)		Goalie stats	Franky Palazzese (34 saves / 37 shots)

March 22	Barrie Colts	4 – 3	OT	Sudbury Wolves	Barrie Molson Centre	Recap
13:42 - pp - Jake Dotchin (1)		First period		Ray Huether (1) - sh - 12:40
18:55 - sh - Zach Hall (2)		Second period		Dominik Kahun (1) - 1:25
18:03 - Justin Scott (2)		Third period		Mathew Campagna (1) - 19:49
1:17 - Zach Hall (3)		First overtime period		No scoring
Mackenzie Blackwood (29 saves / 32 shots)		Goalie stats		Franky Palazzese (30 saves / 34 shots)

March 25	Sudbury Wolves	4 – 6	Barrie Colts	Sudbury Community Arena	Recap
3:40 - Nicholas Baptiste (1)		First period	Jake Dotchin (2) - sh - 8:58; Andrew Mangiapane (1) - pp - 19:31
9:49 - pp - Brody Silk (1)		Second period	Aaron Ekblad (1) - pp - 2:43
7:44 - pp - Radek Faksa (1); 19:15 - Connor Crisp (1)		Third period	Andrew Mangiapane (2) - 0:33; Brendan Lemieux (1) - 14:38; Brendan Lemieux (2) - en - 19:38
Franky Palazzese (27 saves / 32 shots)		Goalie stats	Mackenzie Blackwood (32 saves / 36 shots)

March 27	Sudbury Wolves	2 – 1	Barrie Colts	Sudbury Community Arena	Recap
4:40 - pp - Trevor Carrick (1)		First period	No scoring
10:10 - Danny Desrochers (1)		Second period	Zach Hall (4) - pp - 12:36
No scoring		Third period	No scoring
Franky Palazzese (31 saves / 32 shots)		Goalie stats	Mackenzie Blackwood (21 saves / 23 shots)

March 28	Barrie Colts	7 – 0	Sudbury Wolves	Barrie Molson Centre	Recap
4:49 - pp - Brendan Lemieux (3); 6:42 - Tyson Fawcett (1); 11:19 - Andreas Athanasiou (1)		First period	No scoring
16:36 - pp - Kevin Labanc (2); 19:02 - Andreas Athanasiou (2)		Second period	No scoring
2:05 - Jonathan Laser (1); 18:12 - Kevin Labanc (3)		Third period	No scoring
Mackenzie Blackwood (24 saves / 24 shots)		Goalie stats	Franky Palazzese (29 saves / 36 shots)

Barrie wins series 4 – 1

==== Western conference quarterfinals ====
===== (1) Guelph Storm vs. (8) Plymouth Whalers =====
March 21	Guelph Storm	5 – 2	Plymouth Whalers	Sleeman Centre	Recap
6:47 - pp - Brock McGinn (1)		First period	Carter Sandlak (1) - pp - 6:47
7:30 - Pius Suter (1)		Second period	No scoring
3:02 - Jason Dickinson (1); 12:36 - Stephen Pierog (1); 19:56 - en - Scott Kosmachuk (1)		Third period	Connor Chatham (1) - pp - 19:20
Justin Nichols (19 saves / 21 shots)		Goalie stats	Alex Nedeljkovic (34 saves / 38 shots)

March 22	Guelph Storm	3 – 0	Plymouth Whalers	Sleeman Centre	Recap
4:39 - Matt Finn (1)		First period	No scoring
5:33 - Nick Ebert (1)		Second period	No scoring
17:45 - en - Brock McGinn (2)		Third period	No scoring
Justin Nichols (30 saves / 30 shots)		Goalie stats	Alex Nedeljkovic (35 saves / 37 shots)

March 25	Plymouth Whalers	2 – 1	Guelph Storm	Compuware Arena	Recap
No scoring		First period	Ryan Horvat (1) - 15:32
6:17 - Victor Crus Rydberg (1)		Second period	No scoring
8:00 - Zach Lorentz (1)		Third period	No scoring
Alex Nedeljkovic (52 saves / 53 shots)		Goalie stats	Justin Nichols (25 saves / 27 shots)

March 26	Plymouth Whalers	2 – 7	Guelph Storm	Compuware Arena	Recap
11:45 - Bryce Yetman (1)		First period	No scoring
7:09 - Connor Chatham (2)		Second period	Jason Dickinson (2) - 0:58; Nick Ebert (2) - pp - 13:24; Zack Mitchell (1) - pp - 14:45; Justin Auger (1) - 17:37
No scoring		Third period	Tyler Bertuzzi (1) - 1:45; Pius Suter (2) - 6:50; Jason Dickinson (3) - 8:12
Alex Nedeljkovic (40 saves / 46 shots); Zack Bowman (5 saves / 6 shots)		Goalie stats	Justin Nichols (40 saves / 42 shots)

March 28	Guelph Storm	8 – 3	Plymouth Whalers	Sleeman Centre	Recap
3:18 - Zack Mitchell (2); 14:32 - Nick Ebert (3)		First period	No scoring
13:32 - Tyler Bertuzzi (2)		Second period	Zach Lorentz (2) - 6:39
1:12 - Scott Kosmachuk (2); 3:06 - pp - Kerby Rychel (1); 4:37 - Ryan Horvat (2); 5:57 - Tyler Bertuzzi (3); 14:02 - Nick Ebert (4)		Third period	Zach Lorentz (3) - pp - 7:49; Connor Chatham (3) - 12:42
Justin Nichols (30 saves / 33 shots)		Goalie stats	Alex Nedeljkovic (29 saves / 36 shots); Zack Bowman (6 saves / 7 shots)

Guelph wins series 4 – 1

===== (2) Sault Ste. Marie Greyhounds vs. (7) Owen Sound Attack =====
March 21	Sault Ste. Marie Greyhounds	4 – 5	OT	Owen Sound Attack	Essar Centre	Recap
3:07 - Bryan Moore (1)		First period		No scoring
No scoring		Second period		Santino Centorame (1) - pp - 2:36
1:09 - Jared McCann (1); 6:55 - Jared McCann (2); 8:23 - Jean Dupuy (1)		Third period		Daniel Milne (1) - 1:04; Zach Nastasiuk (1) - 8:30; Zach Nastasiuk (2) - 13:10
No scoring		First overtime period		Kyle Platzer (1) - 2:40
Matt Murray (30 saves / 35 shots)		Goalie stats		Brandon Hope (31 saves / 35 shots)

March 22	Sault Ste. Marie Greyhounds	7 – 3	Owen Sound Attack	Essar Centre	Recap
4:10 - Sergey Tolchinsky (1); 14:27 - Michael Bunting (1)		First period	No scoring
1:14 - Andrew Fritsch (1); 4:32 - Bryan Moore (2); 15:16 - Tyler Gaudet (1); 19:01 - Jean Dupuy (2)		Second period	Santino Centorame (2) - pp - 9:55
17:51 - pp - Michael Bunting (2)		Third period	Santino Centorame (3) - pp - 8:57; Justin Brack (1) - 12:30
Matt Murray (15 saves / 18 shots)		Goalie stats	Brandon Hope (15 saves / 19 shots); Jack Flinn (15 saves / 18 shots)

March 24	Owen Sound Attack	3 – 5	Sault Ste. Marie Greyhounds	Bayshore Community Centre	Recap
No scoring		First period	No scoring
17:02 - Kyle Hope (1)		Second period	Darnell Nurse (1) - pp - 11:26; Andrew Fritsch (2) - pp - 12:58; Jean Dupuy (3) - 13:36
3:10 - Zach Nastasiuk (3); 9:36 - pp - Thomas Schemitsch (1)		Third period	Darnell Nurse (2) - sh - 8:37; Dylan Corson (1) - 15:51
Brandon Hope (27 saves / 32 shots)		Goalie stats	Matt Murray (35 saves / 38 shots)

March 26	Owen Sound Attack	0 – 2	Sault Ste. Marie Greyhounds	Bayshore Community Centre	Recap
No scoring		First period	No scoring
No scoring		Second period	Jørgen Karterud (1) - 13:55
No scoring		Third period	Patrick Watling (1) - sh - 10:24
Jack Flinn (31 saves / 33 shots)		Goalie stats	Matt Murray (24 saves / 24 shots)

March 28	Sault Ste. Marie Greyhounds	6 – 1	Owen Sound Attack	Essar Centre	Recap
1:38 - Alex Gudbranson (1); 3:16 - Tyler Gaudet (2); 9:46 - pp - Michael Bunting (3)		First period	No scoring
1:55 - pp - Michael Bunting (4)		Second period	Chris Bigras (1) - 15:04
13:30 - pp - Michael Bunting (5); 19:33 - pp - Andrew Fritsch (3)		Third period	No scoring
Matt Murray (30 saves / 31 shots)		Goalie stats	Jack Flinn (25 saves / 31 shots)

Sault Ste. Marie wins series 4 – 1

===== (3) Erie Otters vs. (6) Saginaw Spirit =====
March 21	Erie Otters	4 – 3	Saginaw Spirit	Erie Insurance Arena	Recap
15:17 - pp - Connor Brown (1)		First period	Eric Locke (1) - 1:04; Luke Cairns (1) - 6:18
6:25 - pp - André Burakovsky (1)		Second period	Kristoff Kontos (1) - 16:30
5:09 - André Burakovsky (2); 18:18 - pp - Dane Fox (1)		Third period	No scoring
Devin Williams (25 saves / 28 shots)		Goalie stats	Jake Paterson (44 saves / 48 shots)

March 22	Erie Otters	4 – 3	OT	Saginaw Spirit	Erie Insurance Arena	Recap
9:40 - André Burakovsky (3)		First period		No scoring
4:26 - Dane Fox (2); 18:55 - Adam Pelech (1)		Second period		Justin Sefton (1) - 18:12
No scoring		Third period		Luke Cairns (2) - 6:39; Cody Payne (1) - 17:19
2:12 - Dane Fox (3)		First overtime period		No scoring
Devin Williams (22 saves / 25 shots)		Goalie stats		Jake Paterson (38 saves / 42 shots)

March 24	Saginaw Spirit	7 – 6	OT	Erie Otters	Dow Event Center	Recap
1:00 - Eric Locke (2); 4:44 - Dylan Sadowy (1)		First period		André Burakovsky (4) - 2:16
2:48 - Dylan Sadowy (2); 14:38 - Jacob Ringuette (1)		Second period		André Burakovsky (5) - 1:26; Spencer Abraham (1) - 3:03; Brendan Gaunce (1) - 7:19; Adam Pelech (2) - 12:44
5:42 - Jimmy Lodge (1); 14:52 - Jimmy Lodge (2)		Third period		Brendan Gaunce (2) - 19:27
4:13 - Cody Payne (2)		First overtime period		No scoring
Jake Paterson (46 saves / 52 shots)		Goalie stats		Oscar Dansk (20 saves / 25 shots); Devin Williams (11 saves / 13 shots)

March 26	Saginaw Spirit	3 – 7	Erie Otters	Dow Event Center	Recap
3:19 - Blake Clarke (1)		First period	Dane Fox (4) - pp - 9:55; Dane Fox (5) - 14:46; Connor Brown (2) - pp - 17:39
12:03 - pp - Cody Payne (3)		Second period	André Burakovsky (6) - 4:41
9:31 - Dylan Sadowy (3)		Third period	Dane Fox (6) - 10:14; Connor McDavid (1) - 13:27; Joel Wigle (1) - 14:10
Jake Paterson (29 saves / 36 shots)		Goalie stats	Devin Williams (29 saves / 32 shots)

March 27	Saginaw Spirit	2 – 3	OT	Erie Otters	Dow Event Center	Recap
Dylan Sadowy (4) - 17:41; Justin Kea (1) - 18:08		First period		5:29 - Connor McDavid (2)
No scoring		Second period		10:56 - Brendan Gaunce (3)
No scoring		Third period		No scoring
No scoring		First overtime period		2:57 - Michael Curtis (1)
Jake Paterson (36 saves / 39 shots)		Goalie stats		Devin Williams (22 saves / 24 shots)

Erie wins series 4 – 1

===== (4) London Knights vs. (5) Windsor Spitfires =====
March 21	London Knights	6 – 1	Windsor Spitfires	Budweiser Gardens	Recap
7:08 - Michael McCarron (1); 13:41 - pp - Gemel Smith (1); 17:45 - pp - Chris Tierney (1)		First period	No scoring
17:41 - Bo Horvat (1); 18:41 - Owen MacDonald (1)		Second period	No scoring
16:39 - Josh Anderson (1)		Third period	Ben Johnson (1) - sh - 5:48
Anthony Stolarz (26 saves / 27 shots)		Goalie stats	Alex Fotinos (31 saves / 37 shots)

March 22	London Knights	6 – 3	Windsor Spitfires	Budweiser Gardens	Recap
14:14 - Nikita Zadorov (1); 16:49 - Max Domi (1); 19:41 - Nikita Zadorov (2)		First period	No scoring
5:23 - pp - Chris Tierney (2); 9:39 - Brett Welychka (1)		Second period	Brady Vail (1) - sh - 15:49
14:07 - Bo Horvat (2)		Third period	Nikita Yazkov (1) - 7:37; Ben Johnson (2) - pp - 10:37
Anthony Stolarz (33 saves / 36 shots)		Goalie stats	Alex Fotinos (47 saves / 53 shots)

March 25	Windsor Spitfires	2 – 10	London Knights	WFCU Centre	Recap
No scoring		First period	Michael McCarron (2) - 4:39; Bo Horvat (3) - 5:03; Mitch Marner (1) - 11:32; Chris Tierney (3) - sh - 18:14
0:57 - pp - Ben Johnson (3)		Second period	Zach Bell (1) - 3:49; Nikita Zadorov (3) - 7:35; Ryan Rupert (1) - 12:10; Josh Anderson (2) - pp - 13:58
18:52 - pp - Josh Ho-Sang (1)		Third period	Matt Rupert (1) - pp - 14:26; C.J. Yakimowicz (1) - 19:07
Dalen Kuchmey (18 saves / 26 shots); Alex Fotinos (11 saves / 13 shots)		Goalie stats	Anthony Stolarz (24 saves / 26 shots)

March 27	Windsor Spitfires	3 – 4	London Knights	WFCU Centre	Recap
No scoring		First period	Brady Austin (1) - 7:09
0:13 - Ben Johnson (4)		Second period	Gemel Smith (2) - 4:13
5:23 - Sam Povorozniouk (1); 19:22 - Ryan Foss (1)		Third period	Max Domi (2) - 0:43; Bo Horvat (4) - 12:58
Alex Fotinos (31 saves / 35 shots)		Goalie stats	Jake Patterson (34 saves / 37 shots)

London wins series 4 – 0

=== Conference semifinals ===
==== Eastern conference semifinals ====
===== (1) Oshawa Generals vs. (6) Peterborough Petes =====
April 4	Oshawa Generals	3 – 0	Peterborough Petes	General Motors Centre	Recap
No scoring		First period	No scoring
1:42 - pp - Hunter Smith (3)		Second period	No scoring
12:18 - pp - Scott Laughton (3); 13:51 - pp - Cole Cassels (3)		Third period	No scoring
Daniel Altshuller (18 saves / 18 shots)		Goalie stats	Andrew D'Agostini (40 saves / 43 shots)

April 6	Oshawa Generals	2 – 0	Peterborough Petes	General Motors Centre	Recap
2:10 - pp - Dylan Smoskowitz (2); 9:57 - Jacob Busch (1)		First period	No scoring
No scoring		Second period	No scoring
No scoring		Third period	No scoring
Daniel Altshuller (22 saves / 22 shots)		Goalie stats	Andrew D'Agostini (30 saves / 32 shots)

April 8	Peterborough Petes	1 – 3	Oshawa Generals	Peterborough Memorial Centre	Recap
No scoring		First period	No scoring
No scoring		Second period	Cole Cassels (4) - 14:29
19:32 - pp - Greg Betzold (3)		Third period	Aidan Wallace (1) - sh - en - 19:00; Cole Cassels (5) - en - 19:56
Andrew D'Agostini (28 saves / 29 shots)		Goalie stats	Daniel Altshuller (36 saves / 37 shots)

April 10	Peterborough Petes	2 – 5	Oshawa Generals	Peterborough Memorial Centre	Recap
1:19 - Clark Seymour (2)		First period	Jacob Busch (2) - 5:37
5:28 - pp - Hunter Garlent (4)		Second period	Cole Cassels (6) - 2:01; Mitchell Vande Sompel (1) - 6:16; Bradley Latour (2) - 9:40
No scoring		Third period	Bradley Latour (3) - en - 18:54
Andrew D'Agostini (32 saves / 36 shots)		Goalie stats	Daniel Altshuller (27 saves / 29 shots)

Oshawa wins series 4 – 0

===== (2) North Bay Battalion vs. (4) Barrie Colts =====
April 4	North Bay Battalion	1 – 0	Barrie Colts	North Bay Memorial Gardens	Recap
No scoring		First period	No scoring
No scoring		Second period	No scoring
15:28 - Alex Henriksson (5)		Third period	No scoring
Jacob Smith (21 saves / 21 shots)		Goalie stats	Mackenzie Blackwood (25 saves / 26 shots)

April 6	North Bay Battalion	4 – 1	Barrie Colts	North Bay Memorial Gardens	Recap
No scoring		First period	No scoring
No scoring		Second period	No scoring
4:54 - Barclay Goodrow (3); 7:43 - Barclay Goodrow (4); 8:07 - Vincent Praplan (1); 9:05 - pp - Dylan Blujus (3)		Third period	Andreas Athanasiou (3) - 13:59
Jacob Smith (25 saves / 26 shots)		Goalie stats	Mackenzie Blackwood (24 saves / 28 shots); Daniel Gibl (3 saves / 3 shots)

April 8	Barrie Colts	2 – 1	North Bay Battalion	Barrie Molson Centre	Recap
14:52 - Jake Dotchin (3)		First period	No scoring
8:03 - sh - Zach Hall (5)		Second period	No scoring
No scoring		Third period	Alex Henriksson (6) - 18:21
Mackenzie Blackwood (20 saves / 21 shots)		Goalie stats	Jacob Smith (30 saves / 32 shots)

April 10	Barrie Colts	7 – 4	North Bay Battalion	Barrie Molson Centre	Recap
14:29 - Brendan Lemieux (4)		First period	Ben Thomson (1) - 6:18; Barclay Goodrow (5) - 7:01; Michael Amadio (3) - 9:23
8:41 - pp - Brendan Lemieux (5); 11:58 - pp - Brendan Lemieux (6); 14:04 - Tyson Fawcett (2)		Second period	Kyle Wood (2) - 5:22
4:37 - Tyson Fawcett (3); 13:20 - pp - Zach Hall (6); 18:28 - Garrett Hooey (1)		Third period	No scoring
Mackenzie Blackwood (3 saves / 7 shots); Daniel Gibl (23 saves / 23 shots)		Goalie stats	Jacob Smith (26 saves / 33 shots)

April 11	North Bay Battalion	4 – 1	Barrie Colts	North Bay Memorial Gardens	Recap
No scoring		First period	No scoring
No scoring		Second period	No scoring
5:18 - Nick Paul (6); 5:50 - pp - Marcus McIvor (1); 8:37 - Barclay Goodrow (6); 14:57 - pp - Ben Thomson (2)		Third period	Brendan Lemieux (7) - 0:42
Jacob Smith (25 saves / 26 shots)		Goalie stats	Daniel Gibl (18 saves / 22 shots)

April 13	Barrie Colts	2 – 3	North Bay Battalion	Barrie Molson Centre	Recap
1:23 - Garrett Hooey (2)		First period	Nick Paul (7) - pp - 12:04
No scoring		Second period	Ben Thomson (3) - 0:25
19:47 - Aaron Ekblad (2)		Third period	Ben Thomson (4) - sh - 9:48
Mackenzie Blackwood (19 saves / 22 shots)		Goalie stats	Jacob Smith (29 saves / 31 shots)

North Bay wins series 4 – 2

==== Western conference semifinals ====
===== (1) Guelph Storm vs. (4) London Knights =====
April 4	Guelph Storm	6 – 4	London Knights	Sleeman Centre	Recap
12:02 - sh - Pius Suter (3); 12:52 - sh - Robby Fabbri (1); 17:44 - pp - Matt Finn (2)		First period	No scoring
2:02 - pp - Scott Kosmachuk (3)		Second period	Ryan Rupert (2) - pp - 9:04; Max Domi (3) - pp - 11:45
17:54 - Justin Auger (2); 19:50 - en - Kerby Rychel (2)		Third period	Max Domi (4) - 8:12; Michael McCarron (3) - 10:50
Justin Nichols (34 saves / 37 shots)		Goalie stats	Jake Patterson (35 saves / 39 shots)

April 6	Guelph Storm	2 – 7	London Knights	Sleeman Centre	Recap
6:47 - Tyler Bertuzzi (4)		First period	Mitch Marner (2) - 2:03; Chris Tierney (4) - pp - 5:48
No scoring		Second period	Ryan Rupert (3) - 0:44; Josh Anderson (3) - pp - 5:07
1:28 - Pius Suter (4)		Third period	Nikita Zadorov (4) - sh - 7:47; Chris Tierney (5) - pp - 9:06; Brett Welychka (2) - pp - 15:24
Justin Nichols (14 saves / 18 shots); Matthew Mancina (12 saves / 15 shots)		Goalie stats	Jake Patterson (32 saves / 34 shots)

April 8	London Knights	2 – 4	Guelph Storm	Budweiser Gardens	Recap
4:59 - Bo Horvat (5)		First period	No scoring
No scoring		Second period	Phil Baltisberger (1) - 14:24
3:31 - pp - Chris Tierney (6)		Third period	Robby Fabbri (2) - pp - 9:29; Robby Fabbri (3) - 11:42; Phil Baltisberger (2) - en - 18:56
Jake Patterson (47 saves / 50 shots)		Goalie stats	Justin Nichols (39 saves / 41 shots)

April 10	London Knights	3 – 6	Guelph Storm	Budweiser Gardens	Recap
No scoring		First period	Scott Kosmachuk (4) - 7:09; Scott Kosmachuk (5) - 15:29
4:01 - Dakota Mermis (1)		Second period	No scoring
12:58 - pp - Gemel Smith (3); 14:50 - Chandler Yakimowicz (2)		Third period	Zack Mitchell (3) - pp - 0:29; Zack Mitchell (4) - sh - 3:47; Ben Harpur (1) - 9:17; Robby Fabbri (4) - pp - 11:22
Jake Patterson (22 saves / 27 shots); Justin Tugwell (5 saves / 6 shots)		Goalie stats	Justin Nichols (35 saves / 39 shots)

April 11	Guelph Storm	5 – 4	London Knights	Sleeman Centre	Recap
5:05 - Jason Dickinson (4); 10:24 - Zack Mitchell (5)		First period	Mitch Marner (3) - 9:52; Josh Anderson (4) - 18:08
10:07 - Tyler Bertuzzi (5); 11:24 - pp - Robby Fabbri (5); 16:24 - Scott Kosmachuk (6)		Second period	Matt Rupert (2) - ps - 3:31; Josh Anderson (5) - pp - 16:17
No scoring		Third period	No scoring
Justin Nichols (29 saves / 33 shots)		Goalie stats	Jake Patterson (31 saves / 36 shots)

Guelph wins series 4 – 1

===== (2) Sault Ste. Marie Greyhounds vs. (3) Erie Otters =====
April 2	Sault Ste. Marie Greyhounds	1 – 3	Erie Otters	Essar Centre	Recap
No scoring		First period	Michael Curtis (2) - 1:50
No scoring		Second period	Dylan Strome (1) - 11:53
16:14 - Kyle Jenkins (1)		Third period	Connor Brown (3) - 15:58
Matt Murray (23 saves / 26 shots)		Goalie stats	Devin Williams (26 saves / 27 shots)

April 4	Sault Ste. Marie Greyhounds	0 – 4	Erie Otters	Essar Centre	Recap
No scoring		First period	Connor McDavid (3) - 12:13
No scoring		Second period	Brendan Gaunce (4) - pp - 3:02; Dane Fox (7) - pp - 3:31; Connor McDavid (4) - 18:38
No scoring		Third period	No scoring
Matt Murray (36 saves / 40 shots)		Goalie stats	Devin Williams (33 saves / 33 shots)

April 7	Erie Otters	2 – 0	Sault Ste. Marie Greyhounds	Erie Insurance Arena	Recap
No scoring		First period	No scoring
6:13 - Troy Donnay (1)		Second period	No scoring
18:44 - André Burakovsky (7)		Third period	No scoring
Devin Williams (29 saves / 29 shots)		Goalie stats	Matt Murray (29 saves / 31 shots)

April 8	Erie Otters	3 – 2	OT	Sault Ste. Marie Greyhounds	Erie Insurance Arena	Recap
No scoring		First period		Darnell Nurse (3) - pp - 5:49
9:23 - Connor Brown (4)		Second period		Sergey Tolchinsky (2) - 4:45
11:57 - André Burakovsky (8)		Third period		No scoring
7:22 - Joel Wigle (2)		First overtime period		No scoring
Devin Williams (31 saves / 33 shots)		Goalie stats		Matt Murray (35 saves / 38 shots)

Erie wins series 4 – 0

=== Conference finals ===
==== Eastern conference finals ====
===== (1) Oshawa Generals vs. (2) North Bay Battalion =====
April 18	Oshawa Generals	0 – 1	North Bay Battalion	General Motors Centre	Recap
No scoring		First period	No scoring
No scoring		Second period	No scoring
No scoring		Third period	Nick Paul (8) - 15:40
Daniel Altshuller (50 saves / 51 shots)		Goalie stats	Jacob Smith (24 saves / 24 shots)

April 20	Oshawa Generals	2 – 5	North Bay Battalion	General Motors Centre	Recap
5:34 - pp - Dylan Smoskowitz (3)		First period	Barclay Goodrow (7) - 1:30; Nick Paul (9) - sh - 19:13
No scoring		Second period	Brenden Miller (2) - 7:59; Barclay Goodrow (8) - sh - 18:42
17:49 - Stephen Desrocher (1)		Third period	Barclay Goodrow (9) - en - 19:28
Daniel Altshuller (24 saves / 28 shots)		Goalie stats	Jacob Smith (21 saves / 23 shots)

April 22	North Bay Battalion	5 – 3	Oshawa Generals	North Bay Memorial Gardens	Recap
18:27 - pp - Michael Amadio (4); 18:55 - Barclay Goodrow (10)		First period	Michael Dal Colle (6) - 12:05
4:11 - Brenden Miller (3)		Second period	Scott Laughton (4) - pp - 14:59
5:47 - Barclay Goodrow (11); 19:09 - pp - en - Vincent Praplan (2)		Third period	Michael Dal Colle (7) - pp - 16:50
Jacob Smith (15 saves / 18 shots)		Goalie stats	Daniel Altshuller (25 saves / 29 shots)

April 23	North Bay Battalion	3 – 2	Oshawa Generals	North Bay Memorial Gardens	Recap
16:22 - Marcus McIvor (2)		First period	Michael Dal Colle (8) - pp - 19:44
16:35 - pp - Alex Henriksson (7)		Second period	No scoring
14:27 - Jamie Lewis (1)		Third period	Dylan Smoskowitz (4) - 11:07
Jacob Smith (31 saves / 33 shots)		Goalie stats	Ken Appleby (25 saves / 28 shots)

North Bay wins series 4 – 0

==== Western conference finals ====
===== (1) Guelph Storm vs. (3) Erie Otters =====
April 17	Guelph Storm	5 – 4	Erie Otters	Sleeman Centre	Recap
12:54 - Jason Dickinson (5)		First period	Connor Brown (5) - pp - 11:13
1:32 - Tyler Bertuzzi (6); 15:33 - Kerby Rychel (3)		Second period	Brendan Gaunce (5) - 11:30; Dylan Strome (2) - 11:59
2:49 - Tyler Bertuzzi (7); 6:00 - Ryan Horvat (3)		Third period	André Burakovsky (9) - 2:24
Josh Nichols (23 saves / 27 shots)		Goalie stats	Devin Williams (21 saves / 26 shots)

April 18	Guelph Storm	7 – 2	Erie Otters	Sleeman Centre	Recap
9:33 - Scott Kosmachuk (7); 12:32 - Kerby Rychel (4); 15:16 - sh - Zack Mitchell (6)		First period	No scoring
10:04 - Kerby Rychel (5); 18:21 - Scott Kosmachuk (8)		Second period	Cory Genovese (1) - 2:52; André Burakovsky (10) - 18:39
6:23 - Zack Mitchell (7); 16:08 - Robby Fabbri (6)		Third period	No scoring
Josh Nichols (34 saves / 36 shots)		Goalie stats	Oscar Dansk (23 saves / 30 shots)

April 21	Erie Otters	1 – 7	Guelph Storm	Erie Insurance Arena	Recap
13:36 - pp - Connor Brown (6)		First period	Scott Kosmachuk (9) - 0:18; Robby Fabbri (7) - 8:16
No scoring		Second period	Tyler Bertuzzi (8) - 3:10; Robby Fabbri (8) - pp - 17:12
No scoring		Third period	Brock McGinn (3) - sh - 1:06; Kerby Rychel (6) - pp - 2:55; Robby Fabbri (9) - pp - 12:33
Devin Williams (22 saves / 27 shots); Oscar Dansk (12 saves / 14 shots)		Goalie stats	Josh Nichols (23 saves / 24 shots)

April 22	Erie Otters	5 – 2	Guelph Storm	Erie Insurance Arena	Recap
4:48 - Dylan Strome (3); 9:44 - Connor Brown (7); 12:11 - Joel Wigle (3); 17:21 - Dane Fox (8)		First period	Zack Mitchell (8) - 1:15; Kerby Rychel (7) - 12:48
No scoring		Second period	No scoring
19:46 - en - Connor Brown (8)		Third period	No scoring
Devin Williams (26 saves / 28 shots)		Goalie stats	Josh Nichols (8 saves / 11 shots); Matthew Mancina (31 saves / 32 shots)

April 25	Guelph Storm	5 – 0	Erie Otters	Sleeman Centre	Recap
8:42 - pp - Kerby Rychel (8); 11:45 - pp - Matt Finn (3); 19:52 - sh - Nick Ebert (5)		First period	No scoring
No scoring		Second period	No scoring
2:25 - Zack Mitchell (9); 15:30 - sh - en - Zack Mitchell (10)		Third period	No scoring
Josh Nichols (40 saves / 40 shots)		Goalie stats	Devin Williams (35 saves / 39 shots)

Guelph wins series 4 – 1

=== J. Ross Robertson Cup ===
==== (W1) Guelph Storm vs. (E2) North Bay Battalion ====
May 1	Guelph Storm	3 – 2	OT	North Bay Battalion	Sleeman Centre	Recap
No scoring		First period		No scoring
4:07 - Brock McGinn (4)		Second period		Ben Thomson (5) - pp - 3:06
12:23 - Zack Mitchell (11)		Third period		Jamie Lewis (2) - 3:35
0:57 - Jason Dickinson (6)		First overtime period		No scoring
Justin Nichols (32 saves / 34 shots)		Goalie stats		Jacob Smith (27 saves / 30 shots)

May 2	Guelph Storm	3 – 4	OT	North Bay Battalion	Sleeman Centre	Recap
1:16 - Steven Trojanovic (1); 11:56 - Robby Fabbri (10)		First period		Marcus McIvor (3) - pp - 16:01
15:57 - Robby Fabbri (11)		Second period		Mathew Santos (1) - 9:17
No scoring		Third period		Nick Paul (10) - pp - 14:32
No scoring		First overtime period		Barclay Goodrow (12) - 2:30
Justin Nichols (37 saves / 41 shots)		Goalie stats		Jacob Smith (21 saves / 24 shots)

May 6	North Bay Battalion	3 – 4	Guelph Storm	North Bay Memorial Gardens	Recap
14:01 - Mathew Santos (2)		First period	No scoring
16:07 - pp - Barclay Goodrow (13)		Second period	Tyler Bertuzzi (9) - 8:58
Dylan Blujus (4) - 9:03		Third period	Robby Fabbri (12) - pp - 6:47; Zack Mitchell (12) - 19:30; Brock McGinn (5) - 19:49
Jacob Smith (23 saves / 26 shots)		Goalie stats	Justin Nichols (40 saves / 44 shots)

May 7	North Bay Battalion	1 – 10	Guelph Storm	North Bay Memorial Gardens	Recap
No scoring		First period	Pius Suter (5) - 4:24; Scott Kosmachuk (10) - 10:57; Pius Suter (6) - sh - 14:16
No scoring		Second period	Zac Leslie (1) - 3:50; Jason Dickinson (7) - 5:22; Robby Fabbri (13) - 11:24; Tyler Bertuzzi (10) - 18:11; Jason Dickinson (8) - 19:13
10:09 - pp - Nick Paul (11)		Third period	Kerby Rychel (9) - pp - 3:49; Matt Finn (4) - pp - 18:47
Jacob Smith (16 saves / 23 shots); Brendan O'Neill (14 saves / 17 shots)		Goalie stats	Justin Nichols (22 saves / 23 shots)

May 9	Guelph Storm	4 – 3	North Bay Battalion	Sleeman Centre	Recap
17:08 - Brock McGinn (6)		First period	Nick Paul (12) - pp - 16:18; Brett McKenzie (2) - 19:00
19:00 - Matt Finn (5)		Second period	Barclay Goodrow (14) - sh - 6:39
15:31 - Kerby Rychel (10); 19:33 - Kerby Rychel (10)		Third period	No scoring
Justin Nichols (23 saves / 26 shots)		Goalie stats	Jacob Smith (34 saves / 38 shots)

Guelph wins series 4–1

=== J. Ross Robertson Cup Champions Roster ===
2013-14 Guelph Storm
Goaltenders: (Canada) 31 – Matthew Mancina; (Canada) 39 – Justin Nichols	Defencemen: (Canada) 3 – Steven Trojanovic; (Canada) 4 – Matt Finn – C; (Switzerland) 6 – Phil Baltisberger; (Canada) 7 – Ben Harpur; (Canada) 8 – Zac Leslie; (United States) 10 – Nick Ebert; (Canada) 26 – Chadd Bauman; (Canada) 27 – Garrett McFadden	Wingers: (Canada) 11 – Jason Dickinson; (Canada) 13 – Adam Craievich; (Canada) 15 – Marc Stevens; (Canada) 16 – Kerby Rychel; (Canada) 17 – Tyler Bertuzzi; (Canada) 20 – Justin Auger; (Canada) 21 – Brock McGinn – A; (Canada) 23 – Zack Mitchell – A; (Canada) 24 – Scott Kosmachuk	Centres: (Canada) 9 – Robby Fabbri; (Canada) 12 – Ryan Horvat – A; (Canada) 19 – Stephen Pierog; (Switzerland) 22 – Pius Suter; Coach: (Canada) Scott Walker; General Manager: (Canada) Mike Kelly

=== Playoff scoring leaders ===
Note: GP = Games played; G = Goals; A = Assists; Pts = Points; PIM = Penalty minutes

Player	Team	GP	G	A	Pts	PIM
Kerby Rychel	Guelph Storm	20	11	21	32	23
Zack Mitchell	Guelph Storm	20	12	18	30	12
Robby Fabbri	Guelph Storm	16	13	15	28	12
Scott Kosmachuk	Guelph Storm	20	10	18	28	27
Barclay Goodrow	North Bay Battalion	22	14	10	24	23
Jason Dickinson	Guelph Storm	20	8	16	24	6
Michael Dal Colle	Oshawa Generals	12	8	12	20	0
Brenden Miller	North Bay Battalion	21	3	17	20	27
Dane Fox	Erie Otters	14	8	11	19	26
Connor McDavid	Erie Otters	14	4	15	19	2

=== Playoff leading goaltenders ===
Note: GP = Games played; Mins = Minutes played; W = Wins; L = Losses: OTL = Overtime losses; SL = Shootout losses; GA = Goals Allowed; SO = Shutouts; GAA = Goals against average

Player	Team	GP	Mins	W	L	GA	SO	Sv%	GAA
Daniel Altshuller	Oshawa Generals	11	699	8	3	22	3	0.931	1.89
Jake Smith	North Bay Battalion	22	1299	13	9	55	3	0.905	2.54
Mackenzie Blackwood	Barrie Colts	10	552	5	4	24	1	0.904	2.61
Devin Williams	Erie Otters	13	731	9	4	32	2	0.912	2.63
Justin Nichols	Guelph Storm	20	1119	16	4	49	2	0.919	2.63
Matt Murray	Sault Ste. Marie Greyhounds	9	547	4	5	24	1	0.915	2.63

== Awards ==
J. Ross Robertson Cup:	Guelph Storm
Hamilton Spectator Trophy:	Guelph Storm
Bobby Orr Trophy:	North Bay Battalion
Wayne Gretzky Trophy:	Guelph Storm
Emms Trophy:	North Bay Battalion
Leyden Trophy:	Oshawa Generals
Holody Trophy:	Guelph Storm
Bumbacco Trophy:	Sault Ste. Marie Greyhounds
Red Tilson Trophy:	Connor Brown, Erie Otters
Eddie Powers Memorial Trophy:	Connor Brown, Erie Otters
Matt Leyden Trophy:	D. J. Smith, Oshawa Generals
Jim Mahon Memorial Trophy:	Connor Brown, Erie Otters
Max Kaminsky Trophy:	Aaron Ekblad, Barrie Colts
OHL Goaltender of the Year:	Alex Nedeljkovic, Plymouth Whalers
Jack Ferguson Award:	Jakob Chychrun, Sarnia Sting
Dave Pinkney Trophy:	Oscar Dansk & Devin Williams, Erie Otters
OHL Executive of the Year:
Emms Family Award:	Travis Konecny, Ottawa 67's
F. W. "Dinty" Moore Trophy:	Matthew Mancina, Guelph Storm
Dan Snyder Memorial Trophy:	Scott Simmonds, Belleville Bulls
William Hanley Trophy:	Connor McDavid, Erie Otters
Leo Lalonde Memorial Trophy:	Dane Fox, Erie Otters
Bobby Smith Trophy:	Connor McDavid, Erie Otters
Roger Neilson Memorial Award:	Patrick Watling, Sault Ste. Marie Greyhounds
Ivan Tennant Memorial Award:	Adam Craievich, Guelph Storm
Mickey Renaud Captain's Trophy:	Matt Finn, Guelph Storm
Tim Adams Memorial Trophy:	Michael McLeod, Toronto Marlboros
Wayne Gretzky 99 Award:	Robby Fabbri, Guelph Storm

== All-Star teams ==
The OHL All-Star Teams were selected by the OHL's General Managers.

=== First team ===
- Scott Laughton, Centre, Oshawa Generals
- Dane Fox, Left Wing, Erie Otters
- Connor Brown, Right Wing, Erie Otters
- Aaron Ekblad, Defence, Barrie Colts
- Slater Koekkoek, Defence, Windsor Spitfires
- Alex Nedeljkovic, Goaltender, Plymouth Whalers
- D. J. Smith, Coach, Oshawa Generals

=== Second team ===
- Connor McDavid, Centre, Erie Otters
- Michael Dal Colle, Left Wing, Oshawa Generals
- Scott Kosmachuk, Right Wing, Guelph Storm
- Adam Pelech, Defence, Erie Otters
- Nikita Zadorov, Defence, London Knights
- Matt Murray, Goaltender, Sault Ste. Marie Greyhounds
- Kris Knoblauch, Coach, Erie Otters

=== Third team ===
- Sam Bennett, Centre, Kingston Frontenacs
- Max Domi, Left Wing, London Knights
- Nicholas Baptiste, Right Wing, Sudbury Wolves
- Darnell Nurse, Defence, Sault Ste. Marie Greyhounds
- Matt Finn, Defence, Guelph Storm
- Oscar Dansk, Goaltender, Erie Otters
- Scott Walker, Coach, Guelph Storm

== 2014 OHL Priority Selection ==
On April 5, 2014, the OHL conducted the 2014 Ontario Hockey League Priority Selection. The Sarnia Sting held the first overall pick in the draft and selected Jakob Chychrun from the Toronto Jr. Canadiens of the GTHL. Chychrun was awarded the Jack Ferguson Award, awarded to the top pick in the draft.

Below are the players who were selected in the first round of the 2014 Ontario Hockey League Priority Selection.

#	Player	Nationality	OHL team	Hometown	Minor team
1	Jakob Chychrun (D)	/ (United States) Canada/USA	Sarnia Sting	Boca Raton, Florida	Toronto Jr. Canadiens
2	Adam Mascherin (RW)	Canada	Kitchener Rangers	Maple, Ontario	Vaughan Kings
3	Travis Barron (LW)	Canada	Ottawa 67's	Belfountain, Ontario	Toronto Jr. Canadiens
4	Brandon Saigeon (C)	Canada	Belleville Bulls	Grimsby, Ontario	Hamilton Jr. Bulldogs
5	Michael McLeod (C)	Canada	Mississauga Steelheads	Mississauga, Ontario	Toronto Marlboros
6	Logan Brown (C)	United States	Niagara IceDogs	Chesterfield, Missouri	Indiana Ice
7	William Bitten (RW)	Canada	Plymouth Whalers	Gloucester, Ontario	Ottawa Jr. 67's
8	Victor Mete (D)	Canada	Owen Sound Attack	Woodbridge, Ontario	Toronto Jr. Canadiens
9	Jonathan Ang (RW)	Canada	Peterborough Petes	Markham, Ontario	Markham Waxers
10	Tye Felhaber (C)	Canada	Ottawa 67's	Pembroke, Ontario	Ottawa Valley Titans
11	Michael Pezzetta (LW)	Canada	Sudbury Wolves	Toronto, Ontario	Mississauga Senators
12	Logan Stanley (D)	Canada	Windsor Spitfires	Waterloo, Ontario	Waterloo Wolves
13	Givani Smith (LW)	Canada	Barrie Colts	Brampton, Ontario	Mississauga Senators
14	Zachary Poirier (C)	Canada	North Bay Battalion	Mountain, Ontario	Upper Canada Cyclones
15	Reagan O'Grady (D)	Canada	Kingston Frontenacs	Lindsay, Ontario	Toronto Marlboros
16	Cliff Pu (RW)	Canada	Oshawa Generals	Richmond Hill, Ontario	Toronto Marlboros
17	Anthony Salinitri (LW)	Canada	Sault Ste. Marie Greyhounds	Windsor, Ontario	Windsor AAA Zone
18	Max Jones (LW)	United States	London Knights	Rochester, Michigan	Detroit HoneyBaked 18U
19	Taylor Raddysh (RW)	Canada	Erie Otters	Caledon, Ontario	Toronto Marlboros
20	Matthew Hotchkiss (C)	Canada	Guelph Storm	Whitby, Ontario	Whitby Wildcats

== 2014 NHL entry draft ==
On June 27–28, 2014, the National Hockey League conducted the 2014 NHL entry draft held at the Wells Fargo Center in Philadelphia, Pennsylvania. In total, 41 players from the Ontario Hockey League were selected in the draft. Aaron Ekblad of the Barrie Colts was the first player from the OHL to be selected, as he was taken with the first overall pick by the Florida Panthers.

Below are the players selected from OHL teams at the NHL Entry Draft.

Round	#	Player	Nationality	NHL team	Hometown	OHL team
1	1	Aaron Ekblad (D)	Canada	Florida Panthers	Belle River, Ontario	Barrie Colts
1	4	Sam Bennett (C)	Canada	Calgary Flames	Holland Landing, Ontario	Kingston Frontenacs
1	5	Michael Dal Colle (LW)	Canada	New York Islanders	Woodbridge, Ontario	Oshawa Generals
1	10	Nick Ritchie (LW)	Canada	Anaheim Ducks	Orangeville, Ontario	Peterborough Petes
1	12	Brendan Perlini (LW)	Canada	Arizona Coyotes	Sault Ste. Marie, Ontario	Niagara IceDogs
1	19	Tony DeAngelo (D)	United States	Tampa Bay Lightning	Sewell, New Jersey	Sarnia Sting
1	21	Robby Fabbri (C)	Canada	St. Louis Blues	Mississauga, Ontario	Guelph Storm
1	24	Jared McCann (C)	Canada	Vancouver Canucks	London, Ontario	Sault Ste. Marie Greyhounds
1	27	Nikolay Goldobin (RW)	Russia	San Jose Sharks	Moscow, Russia	Sarnia Sting
1	28	Joshua Ho-Sang (RW)	Canada	New York Islanders	Thornhill, Ontario	Windsor Spitfires
2	31	Brendan Lemieux (LW)	Canada	Buffalo Sabres	Paradise Valley, Arizona	Barrie Colts
2	37	Alex Nedeljkovic (G)	United States	Carolina Hurricanes	Parma, Ohio	Plymouth Whalers
2	43	Ryan MacInnis (C)	United States	Arizona Coyotes	St. Louis, Missouri	Kitchener Rangers
2	44	Eric Cornel (RW)	Canada	Buffalo Sabres	Kemptville, Ontario	Peterborough Petes
2	50	Roland McKeown (D)	Canada	Los Angeles Kings	Listowel, Ontario	Kingston Frontenacs
2	54	Hunter Smith (RW)	Canada	Calgary Flames	Windsor, Ontario	Oshawa Generals
2	58	Christian Dvorak (LW)	United States	Arizona Coyotes	Frankfort, Illinois	London Knights
2	59	Brandon Halverson (G)	United States	New York Rangers	Traverse City, Michigan	Sault Ste. Marie Greyhounds
2	60	Alex Lintuniemi (D)	Finland	Los Angeles Kings	Helsinki, Finland	Ottawa 67's
3	71	Connor Chatham (RW)	United States	New Jersey Devils	Shiloh, Illinois	Plymouth Whalers
3	75	Alex Peters (D)	Canada	Dallas Stars	Blyth, Ontario	Plymouth Whalers
3	77	Blake Siebenaler (D)	United States	Columbus Blue Jackets	Fort Wayne, Indiana	Niagara IceDogs
3	81	Dylan Sadowy (LW)	Canada	San Jose Sharks	Woodbridge, Ontario	Saginaw Spirit
3	84	Kyle Wood (D)	Canada	Colorado Avalanche	Waterloo, Ontario	North Bay Battalion
3	90	Michael Amadio (C)	Canada	Los Angeles Kings	Sault Ste. Marie, Ontario	North Bay Battalion
4	93	Nick Magyar (RW)	United States	Colorado Avalanche	Mentor, Ohio	Kitchener Rangers
4	96	Josh Wesley (D)	United States	Carolina Hurricanes	Raleigh, North Carolina	Plymouth Whalers
4	115	Brent Moran (G)	Canada	Dallas Stars	Orleans, Ontario	Niagara IceDogs
4	117	Michael Bunting (LW)	Canada	Arizona Coyotes	Scarborough, Ontario	Sault Ste. Marie Greyhounds
6	154	Aaron Haydon (D)	United States	Dallas Stars	Plymouth, Michigan	Niagara IceDogs
6	156	Kyle Pettit (C)	Canada	Vancouver Canucks	Komoka, Ontario	Erie Otters
6	157	Jake Marchment (C)	Canada	Los Angeles Kings	Courtice, Ontario	Belleville Bulls
6	170	Cristiano DiGiacinto (LW)	Canada	Tampa Bay Lightning	Hamilton, Ontario	Windsor Spitfires
6	171	Kevin Labanc (LW)	United States	San Jose Sharks	Staten Island, New York	Barrie Colts
6	172	Chandler Yakimowicz (C)	United States	St. Louis Blues	Kingston, Pennsylvania	London Knights
6	173	Jaden Lindo (RW)	Canada	Pittsburgh Penguins	Brampton, Ontario	Owen Sound Attack
6	180	Matt Mistele (LW)	Canada	Los Angeles Kings	Whitby, Ontario	Plymouth Whalers
7	187	Kyle Jenkins (D)	Canada	Carolina Hurricanes	Brampton, Ontario	Sault Ste. Marie Greyhounds
7	195	Patrick Sanvido (D)	Canada	Dallas Stars	Guelph, Ontario	Windsor Spitfires
7	209	Spencer Watson (RW)	Canada	Los Angeles Kings	London, Ontario	Kingston Frontenacs
7	210	Jacob Middleton (D)	Canada	Los Angeles Kings	Stratford, Ontario	Ottawa 67's

== 2014 CHL Import Draft ==
On July 2, 2014, the Canadian Hockey League conducted the 2014 CHL Import Draft, in which teams in all three CHL leagues participate in. The Sarnia Sting held the first pick in the draft by a team in the OHL and selected Pavel Zacha from the Czech Republic with the selection.

Below are the players who were selected in the first round by Ontario Hockey League teams in the 2014 CHL Import Draft.

#	Player	Nationality	OHL team	Hometown	Last team
1	Pavel Zacha (C)	Czech Republic	Sarnia Sting	Brno, Czech Republic	HC Bili Tygri Liberec
4	Gustaf Franzen (C)	Sweden	Kitchener Rangers	Valdemarsvik, Sweden	HV71 Jr.
7	Artur Tyanulin (RW)	Russia	Ottawa 67's	Kazan, Russia	Irbis Kazan
10	David Pastrnak (RW)	Czech Republic	Belleville Bulls	Havířov, Czech Republic	Sodertalje SK
13	William Nylander (C)	Sweden	Mississauga Steelheads	Stockholm, Sweden	Modo Hockey
16	Mikkel Aagaard (LW)	Denmark	Niagara IceDogs	Frederikshavn, Denmark	Frederikshavn White Hawks
19	No selection made		Plymouth Whalers		
22	Petrus Palmu (LW)	Finland	Owen Sound Attack	Joensuu, Finland	Jokerit B
25	Dominik Masin (D)	Czech Republic	Peterborough Petes	Městec Králové, Czech Republic	HC Slavia Praha Jr.
28	Artyom Artyomov (RW)	Russia	Saginaw Spirit	Moscow, Russia	Chicago Steel
31	Pavel Jenys (C)	Czech Republic	Sudbury Wolves	Brno, Czech Republic	HC Kometa Brno
34	Markus Soberg (RW)	Norway	Windsor Spitfires	Oslo, Norway	Vastra Frolunda HC Jr. 18
37	Rasmus Andersson (D)	Sweden	Barrie Colts	Malmö, Sweden	Malmo IF Redhawks Jr.
40	Hampus Olsson (RW)	Sweden	North Bay Battalion	Angelholm, Sweden	Rogle BK Jr.
43	Juho Lammikko (LW)	Finland	Kingston Frontenacs	Noormarkku, Finland	Assat Jr.
46	Tobias Lindberg (RW)	Sweden	Oshawa Generals	Stockholm, Sweden	Djurgardens IF Jr.
49	Gustav Bouramman (D)	Sweden	Sault Ste. Marie Greyhounds	Stockholm, Sweden	Lulea HF Jr.
52	Julius Bergman (D)	Sweden	London Knights	Karlskrona, Sweden	Vastra Frolunda HC Jr.
55	Anton Karlsson (LW)	Sweden	Erie Otters	Lerum, Sweden	Vastra Frolunda HC Jr.
57	No selection made		Guelph Storm		

Preceded by 2012–13 OHL season	OHL seasons	Succeeded by 2014–15 OHL season
