= Thomas Schemitsch =

Canadian ice hockey player

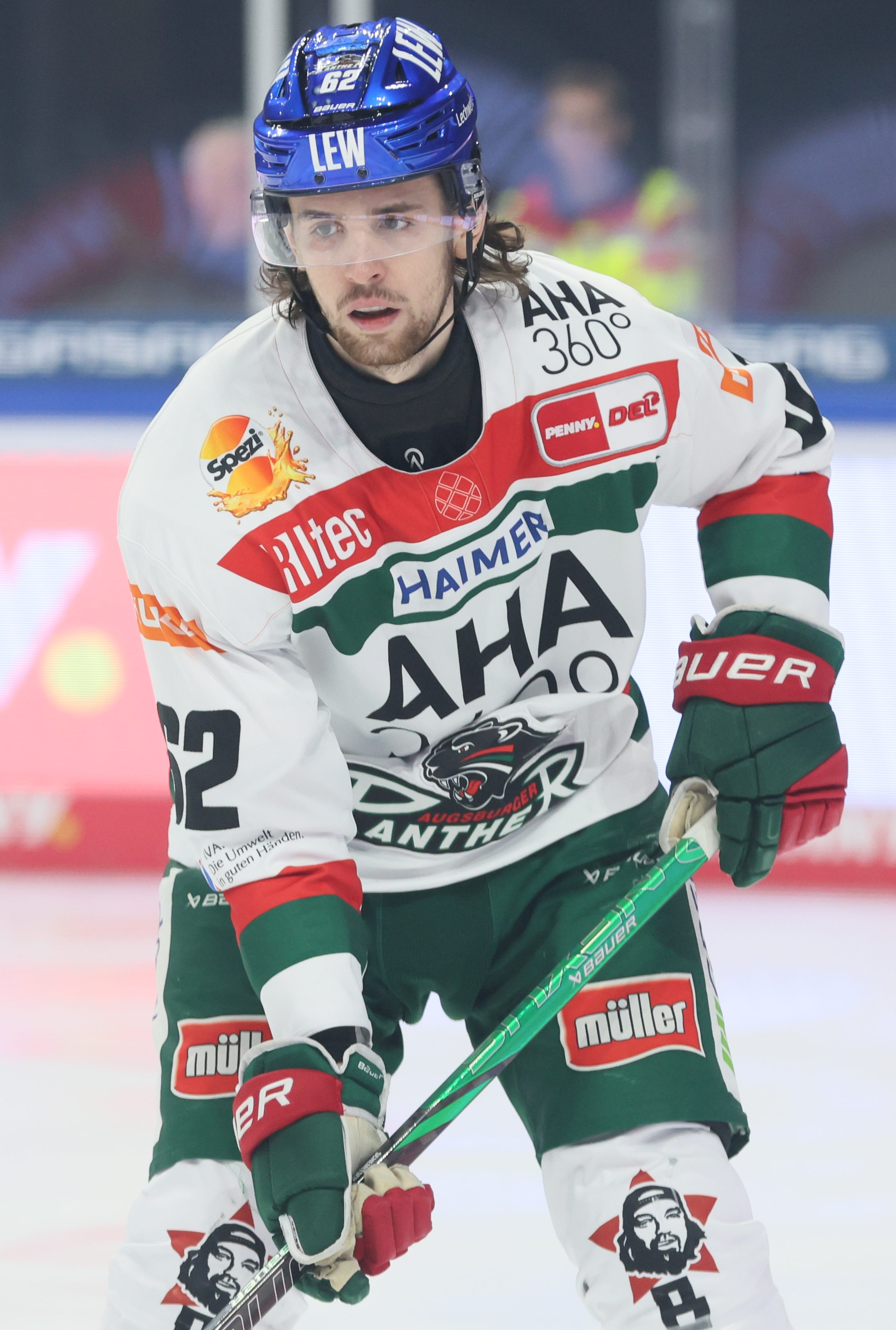
- Schemitsch in 2025
- Born: 26 October 1996 (age 29) Thornhill, Ontario, Canada
- Height: 6 ft 4 in (193 cm)
- Weight: 204 lb (93 kg; 14 st 8 lb)
- Position: Defence
- Shoots: Right
- DEL team Former teams: Augsburger Panther; Springfield Thunderbirds; Cleveland Monsters; Malmö Redhawks; Eisbären Berlin
- NHL draft: 88th overall, 2015; Florida Panthers
- Playing career: 2016–present

Thomas Schemitsch (born 26 October 1996) is a Canadian professional ice hockey defenceman who is currently playing with Augsburger Panther in the Deutsche Eishockey Liga (DEL). He was drafted 88th overall by the Florida Panthers in the third round of the 2015 NHL entry draft and previously played for the Springfield Thunderbirds and Cleveland Monsters in the American Hockey League (AHL).

== Playing career ==
=== Junior ===
After playing junior hockey in the Greater Toronto Hockey League (GTHL) and the Ontario Junior Hockey League (OJHL), Schemitsch was drafted 91st overall in the fifth round of the 2012 OHL Priority Selection. The Owen Sound Attack of the Ontario Hockey League (OHL) signed him on 1 August 2013.

In his OHL debut on 20 September 2013, Schemitsch made his first OHL assist in a 5–3 win against the Mississauga Steelheads. On 5 October 2013, he made his first OHL goal in a 4–2 win against the Kitchener Rangers. Overall, he played 63 games with six goals and 11 assists in his rookie OHL season. He improved his numbers in his sophomore season, playing 68 seasons with 14 goals and 35 assists. Prior to his final OHL season, Schemitsch was named as an alternate captain of the Owen Sound Attack, playing 51 games with nine goals and 22 assists.

=== Professional ===
After being drafted 88th overall by the Florida Panthers in the third round of the 2015 NHL Entry Draft, the Panthers signed Schemitsch to a three-year entry-level contract on 8 October 2016.

On 15 October 2016, he made his professional debut in a 4–2 loss to the Lehigh Valley Phantoms, which was the first game the Springfield Thunderbirds, the Panthers' AHL affiliate, ever played. He scored his first professional goal on 4 April 2017, in a 2–1 loss to the Bridgeport Sound Tigers. In his rookie AHL season, he played 37 games with one goal and three assists and was recalled temporarily for 17 games to the Manchester Monarchs in the third-tier East Coast Hockey League (ECHL). In his next season, he improved his numbers, appearing in 69 games with ten goals and nine assists for the Thunderbirds. In the 2018–19 AHL season, he played 56 games with nine goals and 15 assists.

On 17 July 2019, the Panthers re-signed Schemitsch to a one-year two-way contract, and he played 57 games with four goals and 11 assists for the Thunderbirds in the 2019–20 AHL season. After his contract with the Panthers expired, he did not receive a qualifying offer. On 21 October 2020, Schemitsch signed a one-year AHL contract with the Cleveland Monsters, ultimately playing 28 games with two goals and 16 assists in the shortened season. The Monsters re-signed him a one-year AHL contract on 12 July 2021.

Following his sixth season in the AHL, Schemitsch opted to pursue a career abroad in agreeing to a one-year contract with Swedish club, Malmö Redhawks of the SHL, on August 17, 2022.

== Personal life ==
Schemitsch's brother, Geoffrey, is a former ice hockey defenceman who also played for the Owen Sound Attack and was drafted 96th overall by the Tampa Bay Lightning in the fourth round of the 2010 NHL entry draft.

== Career statistics ==
			Regular season					Playoffs
Season	Team	League	GP	G	A	Pts	PIM	GP	G	A	Pts	PIM
2012–13	Toronto Lakeshore Patriots	OJHL	4	0	0	0	0	1	0	0	0	0
2013–14	Owen Sound Attack	OHL	63	6	11	17	26	5	1	0	1	2
2014–15	Owen Sound Attack	OHL	68	14	35	49	36	5	0	2	2	2
2015–16	Owen Sound Attack	OHL	51	9	22	31	22	6	0	4	4	2
2016–17	Springfield Thunderbirds	AHL	37	1	3	4	4	—	—	—	—	—
2016–17	Manchester Monarchs	ECHL	17	1	7	8	6	16	0	6	6	8
2017–18	Springfield Thunderbirds	AHL	69	10	9	19	40	—	—	—	—	—
2018–19	Springfield Thunderbirds	AHL	56	9	15	24	31	—	—	—	—	—
2019–20	Springfield Thunderbirds	AHL	57	4	11	15	40	—	—	—	—	—
2020–21	Cleveland Monsters	AHL	28	2	16	18	19	—	—	—	—	—
2021–22	Cleveland Monsters	AHL	71	6	17	23	46	—	—	—	—	—
2022–23	Malmö Redhawks	SHL	49	3	11	14	56	—	—	—	—	—
2023–24	Eisbären Berlin	DEL	5	1	3	4	0	15	0	4	4	8
2024–25	Augsburger Panther	DEL	47	11	16	27	81	—	—	—	—	—
AHL totals			318	32	71	103	180	—	—	—	—	—

== Awards and honours ==
Award	Year
DEL
Champions (Eisbären Berlin)	2024
