= Ben Johnson (ice hockey) =

American professional ice hockey player (born 1994)

- Born: June 7, 1994 (age 32) Calumet, Michigan, U.S.
- Height: 6 ft 0 in (183 cm)
- Weight: 190 lb (86 kg; 13 st 8 lb)
- Position: Forward
- Shot: Left
- ECHL team Former teams: Free agent Albany Devils; Orlando Solar Bears; Adirondack Thunder; Cincinnati Cyclones; Kansas City Mavericks; HC Nové Zámky; HK Dukla Michalovce; HK Spisska Nova Ves
- NHL draft: 90th overall, 2012; New Jersey Devils
- Playing career: 2014–2026

Benjamin Johnson (born June 7, 1994) is an American professional ice hockey player who is currently a free agent.

He was selected by the New Jersey Devils in the 3rd round (90th overall) of the 2012 NHL entry draft. His contract was terminated by the Devils shortly after he was convicted in September 2016 for a 2013 sexual assault. After a stint in prison, Johnson later played in the ECHL for the Cincinnati Cyclones and Kansas City Mavericks and in the Slovak Extraliga with HK Dukla Michalovce and HK Spisska Nova Ves.

== Career ==
=== Amateur hockey ===
Johnson attended Calumet High School in Calumet, Michigan where he played on the high school hockey team. He was recognized for his outstanding play during the 2010–11 season when he was named a co-winner of Michigan's Mr. Hockey as the Top High School Player in Michigan, becoming only the second junior to win the award (Justin Abdelkader won the award as a junior in 2004).

With the 2011–12 season, Johnson joined the Windsor Spitfires of the Ontario Hockey League. Playing three seasons of major junior hockey with the Spitfires, Johnson scored 66 goals and 62 assists for 128 points, while earning 106 penalty minutes, in 191 games played.

=== Professional hockey ===
On April 3, 2014, Johnson signed an amateur tryout contract with the Albany Devils, and played five games with the AHL team near the end of the 2013–14 season. On May 20, 2014, the New Jersey Devils of the National Hockey League signed Johnson to a three-year entry-level contract.

=== Sexual assault conviction ===
In March 2013, Johnson was charged with two counts of sexual assault in connection with two separate incidents that took place in Windsor. The first occurred against a 16-year-old girl in the washroom of Mynt nightclub during the Spitfires' end of season St. Patrick's Day party. Johnson forced her to perform oral sex in a bathroom stall while she was intoxicated before he raped her, causing vaginal bleeding. During the course of the investigation, a second woman, aged 20, came forward and told police that she had also been sexually assaulted by Johnson in the washroom of a second bar weeks prior.

In November 2015, Johnson was acquitted of sexual assaulting the second woman, with the judge finding that while there had been an incident between them in the bar washroom, it was not proven beyond a reasonable doubt that he had forced her to touch his penis. In September 2016, Johnson was convicted of the charge related to events at the Mynt nightclub. That same day, the Devils initiated the process to terminate Johnson's contract. On October 25, 2016, he was sentenced to a 3-year prison term for the sexual assault. Before being released into Watertown, New York in 2018, Johnson served one month in jail at Windsor and 12 months in a prison in Kingston, Ontario.

=== Subsequent career ===
On December 7, 2018 Johnson resumed his professional career in the ECHL signing a contract for the remainder of the 2018–19 ECHL season with the Cincinnati Cyclones.

Following a two-season stint with the Cyclones, Johnson sat out for the COVID-19 pandemic affected 2020–21 season. He made his return to the ECHL during the 2021–22 season, agreeing to a contract with the Kansas City Mavericks on December 5, 2021. The Mavericks extended a qualifying contract offer to Johnson for the 2022–23 ECHL season, but Johnson had already committed to playing in the Slovak Extraliga for that season.

In the 2024–25 Slovak Extraliga season, Johnson played with HK Dukla Michalovce and HK Spisska Nova Ves and had 34 points in 39 games.

On November 18, 2025, the ECHL's Adirondack Thunder coaching staff agreed to sign Johnson, but the decision was reversed within 24 hours after backlash by team ownership. In mid December, Johnson made an Instagram post saying that he went to prison for "things that were alleged to have happened" and "damaging accusations" and criticized the NHL for being "pro cancel and pro silencing" and that were stopping him from being a professional hockey player in the United States. On December 29, 2025, Johnson was signed to an amateur tryout with the Allen Americans of the ECHL. The following day, again after backlash, he was released from the contract.

== Personal life ==
Johnson lives in Minneapolis with his wife and two daughters. Johnson was baptized at a Lutheran church in his youth. While in prison for sexual assault in Windsor, Ontario, Johnson said that he rediscovered his faith and founded a Christian non-profit organization called Defend the Truth Ministries. Johnson also has a TikTok devoted to reading scripture.

== Career statistics ==
			Regular season					Playoffs
Season	Team	League	GP	G	A	Pts	PIM	GP	G	A	Pts	PIM
2010–11	Calumet High	USHS	30	37	40	77	12	—	—	—	—	—
2010–11	Fargo Force	USHL	5	0	0	0	2	—	—	—	—	—
2010–11	U.S. National Development Team	USHL	2	1	0	1	0	—	—	—	—	—
2011–12	Windsor Spitfires	OHL	68	18	20	38	44	4	0	2	2	0
2012–13	Windsor Spitfires	OHL	64	20	17	37	32	—	—	—	—	—
2013–14	Windsor Spitfires	OHL	59	28	25	53	30	4	4	2	6	2
2013–14	Albany Devils	AHL	5	0	1	1	0	—	—	—	—	—
2014–15	Albany Devils	AHL	28	1	1	2	8	—	—	—	—	—
2014–15	Orlando Solar Bears	ECHL	12	2	6	8	0	4	2	2	4	0
2015–16	Albany Devils	AHL	16	5	2	7	6	—	—	—	—	—
2015–16	Adirondack Thunder	ECHL	13	3	3	6	6	12	2	5	7	20
2018–19	Cincinnati Cyclones	ECHL	44	10	18	28	29	11	3	1	4	6
2019–20	Cincinnati Cyclones	ECHL	60	21	31	52	49	—	—	—	—	—
2021–22	Kansas City Mavericks	ECHL	53	24	25	49	37	—	—	—	—	—
2022–23	HC Nové Zámky	Slovak	50	15	25	40	48	5	2	3	5	2
2023–24	HC Nové Zámky	Slovak	33	4	5	9	18	—	—	—	—	—
2024–25	HK Dukla Michalovce	Slovak	26	6	15	21	10	—	—	—	—	—
2024–25	HK Spišská Nová Ves	Slovak	13	5	8	13	4	6	0	1	1	0
ECHL totals			182	60	83	143	121	27	7	8	15	26
Slovakia totals			122	30	53	83	80	11	2	4	6	2
AHL totals			49	6	4	10	14	—	—	—	—	—

== Awards and honors ==
Awards	Year
Michigan Mr. Hockey - Top High School Player in Michigan	2011
