= Ryan Horvat =

Canadian ice hockey player

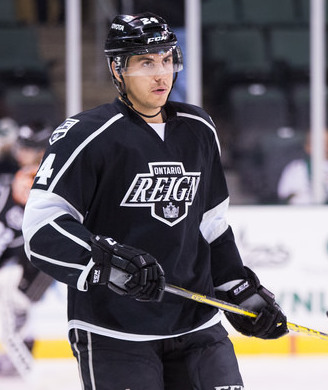
- Horvat with the Ontario Reign
- Born: February 9, 1993 (age 33) Simcoe, Ontario, Canada
- Height: 5 ft 11 in (180 cm)
- Weight: 185 lb (84 kg; 13 st 3 lb)
- Position: Left wing
- Shoots: Left
- Played for: Manchester Monarchs; Ontario Reign; Springfield Thunderbirds; WBS Penguins; Charlotte Checkers; Nottingham Panthers
- NHL draft: Undrafted
- Playing career: 2014–present

Ryan Horvat (born February 9, 1993) is a Canadian ice hockey left wing who last played for the Nottingham Panthers of the Elite Ice Hockey League (EIHL).

== Playing career ==
=== Major junior ===
Horvat was drafted 111th overall by Guelph Storm in the 2009 Ontario Hockey League Priority Selection. He started the 2009–10 season with the Listowel Cyclones but was called up to the OHL in January 2010. Horvat was called up again the following season but was not a consistent member of Storm's line-up until the 2011–12 season. At the conclusion of the 2012–13 season, Horvat was nominated for the Roger Neilson Memorial Award as the post-secondary player in the OHL with the best grades. He was awarded the Mike Kelly Humanitarian Award, and the Fay Scott Memorial Award for his community service and academic achievements. The following season, Horvat was awarded the Winmar Community Hero Award by the team. In his final year of major junior hockey, Horvat helped guide Guelph Storm to the J. Ross Robertson Cup, beating North Bay Battalion 4–3. They lost the 2014 Memorial Cup Finals to the Edmonton Oil Kings 6–4.

=== Professional ===
Horvat signed his first professional contract with the Manchester Monarchs in the American Hockey League (AHL) on August 22, 2014. He helped guide the Monarch to a Calder Cup, the only Calder Cup the Monarchs ever won as the team relocated to Ontario, California the following season. Horvat rejoined the Monarchs, renamed the Ontario Reign, before the 2015–16 season.

Horvat joined the Springfield Thunderbirds for the 2016–17 season and signed a one way contract with the Thunderbirds on June 8, 2017. On November 15, Horvat was taken out of the Thunderbirds line-up due to a lingering shoulder injury. He returned to the ice on December 15 to help lead the Thunderbirds past the Bridgeport Sound Tigers.

Following training camp, Horvat joined the Wilkes-Barre/Scranton Penguins for the 2018–19 season. After appearing in just 6 games with the Penguins through November, Horvat was released from his try-out and returned to former club, the Springfield Thunderbirds on November 21, 2018. He remained with the club for the remainder of the season, notching 10 points in 41 regular season games.

As a free agent in the off-season, Horvat was signed to an ECHL contract with the Greenville Swamp Rabbits on September 17, 2019. Prior to the 2019–20 season, Horvat was added to the defending champion's Charlotte Checkers roster on a professional try-out on October 3, 2019. He appeared in 7 games with the Checkers, registering 1 assist before he was released from his PTO on November 8, 2019. In December of that year, it was announced that he had signed with the Nottingham Panthers of the EIHL, marking Horvat's first contract outside of North America.

== Personal life ==
Horvat studied policing at the University of Guelph while playing with Guelph Storm. His father, Zonk, is in law enforcement.

== Career statistics ==
			Regular season					Playoffs
Season	Team	League	GP	G	A	Pts	PIM	GP	G	A	Pts	PIM
2009–10	Listowel Cyclones	GOJHL	49	9	16	25	60	6	1	1	2	6
2009–10	Guelph Storm	OHL	4	0	1	1	0	—	—	—	—	—
2010–11	Listowel Cyclones	GOJHL	40	21	29	50	72	—	—	—	—	—
2010–11	Guelph Storm	OHL	9	0	0	0	0	—	—	—	—	—
2011–12	Guelph Storm	OHL	55	7	18	25	63	—	—	—	—	—
2012–13	Guelph Storm	OHL	58	10	19	29	69	5	0	0	0	6
2013–14	Guelph Storm	OHL	59	15	14	29	50	20	3	4	7	19
2014–15	Manchester Monarchs	AHL	52	3	8	11	89	9	0	1	1	4
2015–16	Ontario Reign	AHL	59	5	10	15	91	5	0	0	0	2
2016–17	Springfield Thunderbirds	AHL	47	5	12	17	73	—	—	—	—	—
2017–18	Springfield Thunderbirds	AHL	57	4	17	21	51	—	—	—	—	—
2018–19	Wilkes-Barre/Scranton Penguins	AHL	6	0	1	1	9	—	—	—	—	—
2018–19	Springfield Thunderbirds	AHL	41	1	9	10	69	—	—	—	—	—
2019–20	Charlotte Checkers	AHL	7	0	1	1	9	—	—	—	—	—
2019–20	Nottingham Panthers	EIHL	27	3	10	13	29	—	—	—	—	—
AHL totals			269	18	58	76	391	14	1	0	1	6

== Awards and honours ==
Award	Year
OHL
Mike Kelly Humanitarian Award	2013
Fay Scott Memorial Award	2013
AHL
Calder Cup (Manchester Monarchs)	2015
