= Zack Mitchell =

Canadian ice hockey player (born 1993)

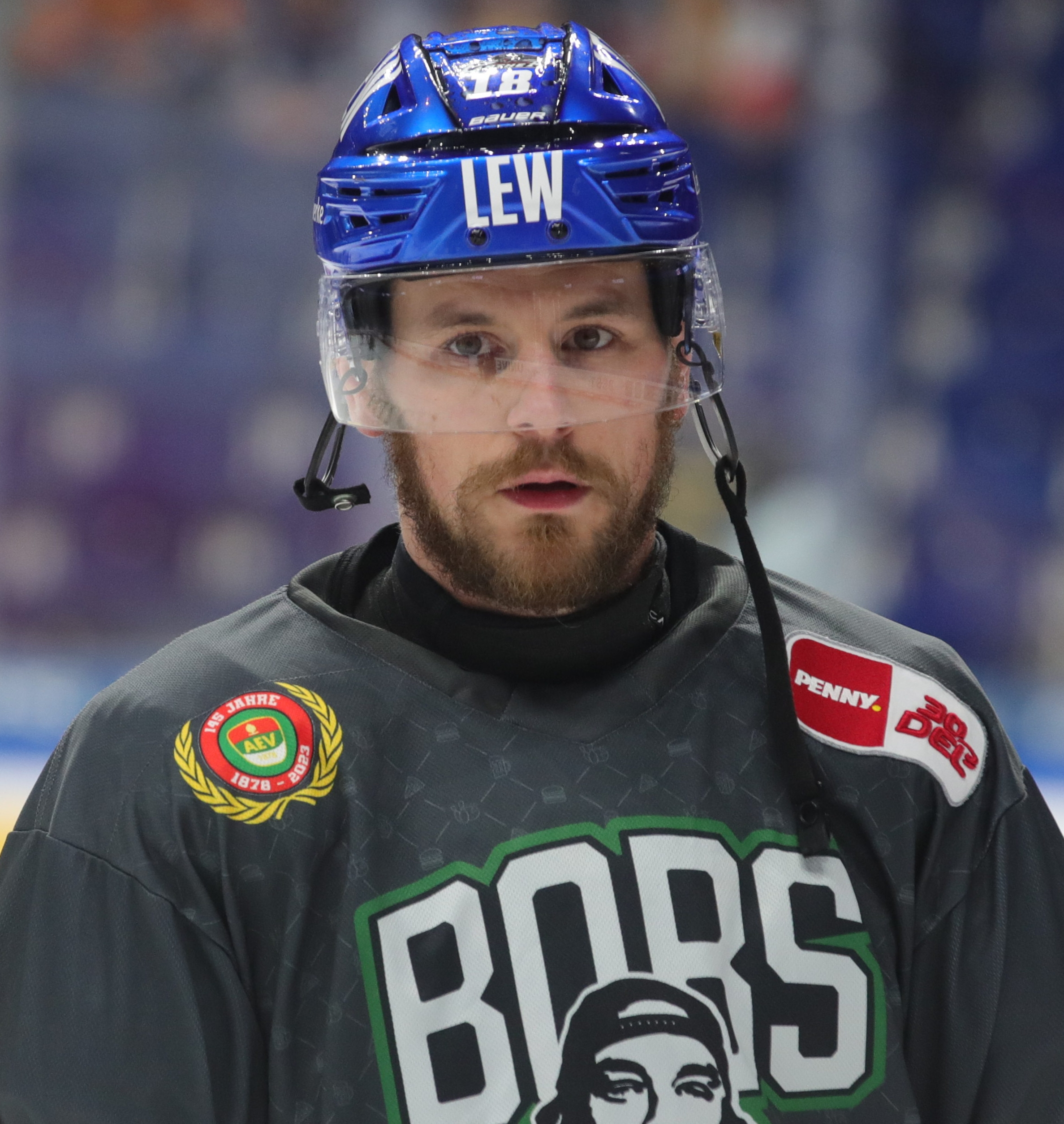
- Mitchell with the Augsburger Panther during the 2023-24 season
- Born: 7 January 1993 (age 33) Orangeville, Ontario, Canada
- Height: 6 ft 0 in (183 cm)
- Weight: 185 lb (84 kg; 13 st 3 lb)
- Position: Centre
- Shoots: Right
- team Former teams: Free agent Iowa Wild; Minnesota Wild; Ontario Reign; Neftekhimik Nizhnekamsk; Dinamo Riga; Dinamo Minsk; SC Rapperswil-Jona Lakers; HC Ambrì-Piotta; Augsburger Panther
- NHL draft: Undrafted
- Playing career: 2014–present

Zachery "Zack" Mitchell (born 7 January 1993) is a Canadian professional ice hockey forward who is currently a free agent. He has previously played in the National Hockey League (NHL) with the Minnesota Wild.

== Playing career ==
Mitchell played major junior hockey in his native Ontario with the Guelph Storm of the Ontario Hockey League. Undrafted, Mitchell scored 83 points in 67 games in the 2013–14 season with the Storm. He completed his junior career with the Storm as the franchise leader in games played with 322 before he was signed by the Minnesota Wild to a three-year entry-level contract on 4 March 2014.

After attending his first training camp with the Wild, Mitchell was assigned to begin the 2014–15 season and his professional career with their affiliate, the Iowa Wild of the AHL, on 27 September 2014. In his rookie season with Iowa, Mitchell was the only player to appear in every regular season game, contributing with 17 goals and 35 points in 76 contests.

In the final year of his rookie contract, Mitchell received his first recall to the Wild in the 2016–17 season, on 9 November 2016. He made his debut the following night, in a victory over the Pittsburgh Penguins on 10 November 2016. He went on to appear in 11 games for Minnesota over the course of the season.

In the 2017–18 season, on 26 October 2017, Mitchell recorded his first NHL goal in an eventual 6-4 win against the New York Islanders, along with fellow rookie Luke Kunin. Mitchell was reassigned to Iowa later but Kunin stayed up. Mitchell was recalled from Iowa on 21 November 2017, while Joel Eriksson Ek and Luke Kunin were sent down. On 1 January 2018, Mitchell was placed on waivers by the Wild, and was then assigned to their AHL affiliate, the Iowa Wild, on 2 January. Mitchell finished the season playing in a career best 23 games with Minnesota, contributing with 3 goals and 5 points.

As a free agent from the Wild in the off-season, Mitchell joined his second NHL club in agreeing to a one-year, two-way contract with the Los Angeles Kings on 14 July 2018. In the 2018–19 season, Mitchell played exclusively with the Kings' AHL affiliate, the Ontario Reign, posting 15 goals and 31 points in 61 games.

Leaving the Kings organization at the conclusion of his contract, Mitchell opted to sign his first contract abroad in agreeing to a one-year deal with HC Neftekhimik Nizhnekamsk of the KHL on 1 July 2019. In his first season abroad in the 2019–20 season, Mitchell made a successful transition away from the North American style, registering 17 goals and 26 points in 54 regular season games with Nizhnekamsk.

At the conclusion of his contract, Mitchell left Nizhnekamsk as a free agent but continued in the KHL after securing a one-year contract with Latvian-based club Dinamo Riga, on 4 August 2020. Registering 6 goals and 9 points in 24 games, Mitchell was traded mid-season from Dinamo Riga to HC Dinamo Minsk on 28 December 2020.

After one season in the Swiss National League (NL) with SC Rapperswil-Jona Lakers, Mitchell returned to the KHL in agreeing to a one-year deal with HC Vityaz on 14 June 2022. Mitchell was released from his contract with Vityaz before making an appearance with the club and returned to the Swiss NL, playing just one game in the 2022–23 season with HC Ambrì-Piotta before he was sidelined due to a shoulder injury.

On 21 June 2023, Mitchell opted to sign a one-year contract with Augsburger Panther of the DEL. He put up 5 goals and 18 assists for 23 points in 48 games.

== Career statistics ==
=== Regular season and playoffs ===
			Regular season					Playoffs
Season	Team	League	GP	G	A	Pts	PIM	GP	G	A	Pts	PIM
2008–09	Toronto Marlboros	GTMMHL	77	42	48	90	74	—	—	—	—	—
2009–10	Guelph Storm	OHL	59	3	7	10	25	5	2	0	2	0
2010–11	Guelph Storm	OHL	61	9	10	19	24	6	1	6	7	2
2011–12	Guelph Storm	OHL	67	37	38	75	32	6	2	2	4	2
2012–13	Guelph Storm	OHL	68	22	34	56	34	5	1	1	2	4
2013–14	Guelph Storm	OHL	67	31	52	83	40	20	12	18	30	12
2014–15	Iowa Wild	AHL	76	17	18	35	12	—	—	—	—	—
2015–16	Iowa Wild	AHL	70	22	20	42	26	—	—	—	—	—
2016–17	Iowa Wild	AHL	62	11	11	22	10	—	—	—	—	—
2016–17	Minnesota Wild	NHL	11	0	0	0	0	—	—	—	—	—
2017–18	Iowa Wild	AHL	42	16	17	33	10	—	—	—	—	—
2017–18	Minnesota Wild	NHL	23	3	2	5	4	—	—	—	—	—
2018–19	Ontario Reign	AHL	61	15	16	31	33	—	—	—	—	—
2019–20	Neftekhimik Nizhnekamsk	KHL	54	17	9	26	14	4	0	0	0	0
2020–21	Dinamo Riga	KHL	24	6	3	9	6	—	—	—	—	—
2020–21	Dinamo Minsk	KHL	21	5	12	17	10	5	0	0	0	4
2021–22	SC Rapperswil-Jona Lakers	NL	51	11	12	23	8	6	1	2	3	0
2022–23	HC Ambrì-Piotta	NL	1	0	0	0	0	—	—	—	—	—
2023–24	Augsburger Panther	DEL	48	5	18	23	10	—	—	—	—	—
NHL totals			34	3	2	5	4	—	—	—	—	—
KHL totals			99	28	24	52	30	9	0	0	0	4

=== International ===
Year	Team	Event	Result	GP	G	A	Pts	PIM
2010	Canada Ontario	U17	2nd place, silver medalist(s)	6	1	0	1	2
Junior totals				6	1	0	1	2
