= Justin Auger =

Canadian ice hockey player (born 1994)

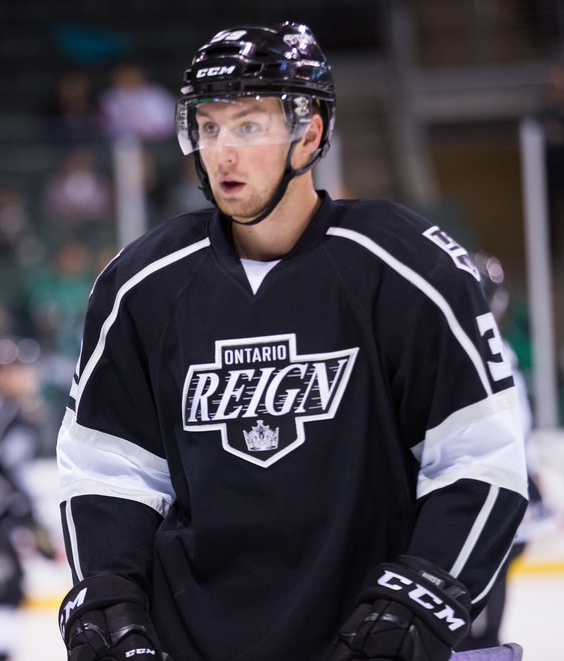
- Auger with the Ontario Reign in 2015
- Born: May 14, 1994 (age 32) Waterloo, Ontario, Canada
- Height: 6 ft 7 in (201 cm)
- Weight: 229 lb (104 kg; 16 st 5 lb)
- Position: Right wing
- Shot: Right
- Played for: Los Angeles Kings
- NHL draft: 103rd, overall, 2013; Los Angeles Kings
- Playing career: 2014–2020

Justin Auger (born May 14, 1994) is a Canadian former professional ice hockey forward who played with the Los Angeles Kings of the National Hockey League (NHL).

== Playing career ==
Auger first played junior hockey with the Waterloo Siskins in the Greater Ontario Junior Hockey League. He was selected in the 2010 OHL Priority Draft, 112th overall by the Guelph Storm. He later made his debut in the Ontario Hockey League with the Storm in the 2011–12 season before he was selected by the Los Angeles Kings in the fourth round, 103rd overall, in the 2013 NHL entry draft.

On October 6, 2014, Auger turned pro for the 2014–15 season, after he was signed by the Kings to a three-year, entry-level contract. He was assigned to AHL affiliate, the Manchester Monarchs, and with using his size to his advantage he quickly adapted to become entrenched in a checking-line role. Adding 29 points 70 games, Auger appeared in 19 post-season games, as the Monarchs claimed the Calder Cup in their last season in the AHL.

Auger played two further seasons as a regular in the AHL with new affiliate the Ontario Reign, before he was re-signed to a one-year, two-way contract extension on July 14, 2017. In the 2017–18 season, after three games with the Reign, Auger received his first recall to the Los Angeles Kings on October 17, 2017. He made his NHL debut with the Kings the following day, in a 5-1 victory over the Montreal Canadiens. After two scoreless games with the Kings, Auger was returned for the remainder of the season to the Ontario Reign, posting 25 points in 65 games.

As an impending restricted free agent, Auger was surprisingly not tendered a qualifying offer by the Kings and was released to free agency. Unable to attract a contract offer, Auger accepted an invite to the Calgary Flames 2018 training camp on a professional try-out basis. On September 22, 2018, Auger was released from his try-out with the Flames, and invited to AHL affiliate, the Stockton Heat, training camp.

Auger did not catch on with the Heat and prior to the opening of the 2018–19 ECHL season, he agreed to a one-year contract with the Florida Everblades on October 18, 2018.

== Career statistics ==
			Regular season					Playoffs
Season	Team	League	GP	G	A	Pts	PIM	GP	G	A	Pts	PIM
2010–11	Waterloo Siskins	GOJHL	42	22	15	37	57	4	2	5	7	2
2011–12	Guelph Storm	OHL	58	7	7	14	39	6	0	0	0	0
2012–13	Guelph Storm	OHL	68	16	17	33	39	5	0	0	0	0
2013–14	Guelph Storm	OHL	53	11	12	23	61	20	2	5	7	15
2014–15	Manchester Monarchs	AHL	70	13	16	29	59	19	1	1	2	8
2015–16	Ontario Reign	AHL	68	19	17	36	57	13	3	2	5	6
2016–17	Ontario Reign	AHL	61	11	9	20	58	5	2	1	3	6
2017–18	Ontario Reign	AHL	65	11	14	25	39	4	1	0	1	0
2017–18	Los Angeles Kings	NHL	2	0	0	0	0	—	—	—	—	—
2018–19	Florida Everblades	ECHL	23	12	9	21	14	16	3	7	10	20
2018–19	Rockford IceHogs	AHL	9	2	0	2	6	—	—	—	—	—
2018–19	Belleville Senators	AHL	2	0	0	0	0	—	—	—	—	—
2019–20	Florida Everblades	ECHL	59	26	20	46	42	—	—	—	—	—
NHL totals			2	0	0	0	0	—	—	—	—	—

== Awards and honors ==
Award	Year
AHL
Calder Cup (Manchester Monarchs)	2015
