= Dane Fox =

Canadian professional ice hockey Center

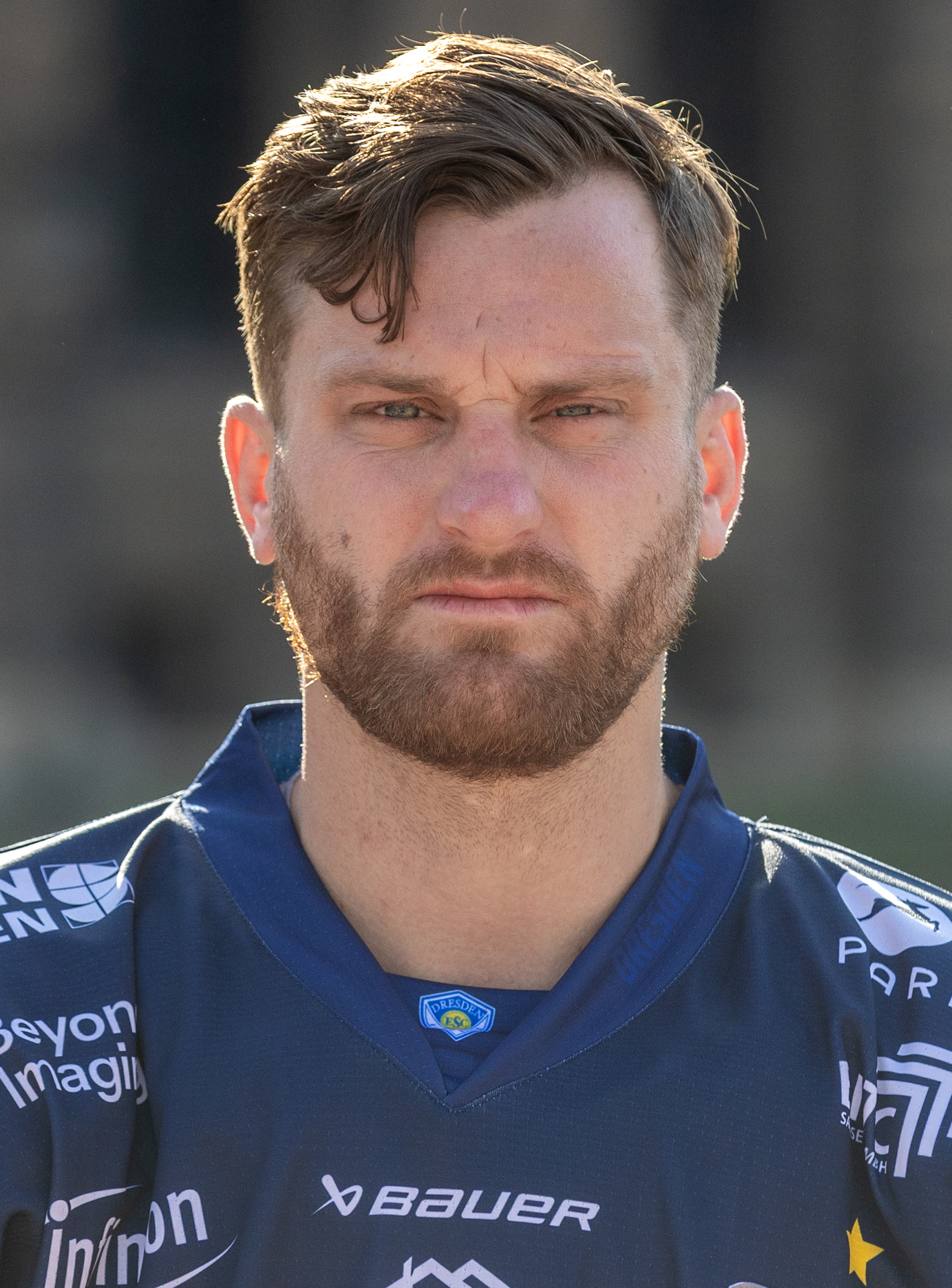
- Fox in 2026
- Born: October 13, 1993 (age 32) Chatham, Ontario, Canada
- Height: 6 ft 1 in (185 cm)
- Weight: 190 lb (86 kg; 13 st 8 lb)
- Position: Centre
- Shoots: Left
- DEL team Former teams: Dresdner Eislöwen; Utica Comets; Charlotte Checkers; Kansas City Mavericks; Nürnberg Ice Tigers; Frederikshavn White Hawks
- NHL draft: Undrafted
- Playing career: 2014–present

Dane Fox (born October 13, 1993) is a Canadian professional ice hockey center who plays for Dresdner Eislöwen of the Deutsche Eishockey Liga (DEL).

== Playing career ==
On December 28, 2013, the Vancouver Canucks signed Fox as a free-agent to an entry-level contract, and he was assigned to continue playing with the Erie Otters where, during the 2013–14 OHL season, he registered a career-high 64 goals in 67 games to lead the OHL in goals scored.

During the 2015–16 season, his second professional year within the Canucks organization, Fox was primarily assigned to secondary affiliate, the Kalamazoo Wings of the ECHL. In leading the Wings in scoring with 50 points in 53 games, Fox was still unable to gain promotion to the AHL with the Utica Comets on a full-time basis and on March 7, 2016, Fox was traded by the Canucks to the Carolina Hurricanes in exchange for future considerations, in which a minor-league loan of players was completed. Fox was directly assigned to the AHL with the Charlotte Checkers.

As a free agent in the off-season from the Hurricanes, Fox opted to continue in the ECHL, signing a one-year deal with the Missouri Mavericks on August 25, 2016.

Approaching his fourth European season, Fox after a one-year stint in the Danish Metal Ligaen with the Frederikshavn White Hawks, opted to return to former club and newly renamed, Nürnberg Ice Tigers of the DEL, on August 16, 2020.

== Personal ==
Dane Fox was born in Chatham, Ontario on October 13, 1993, to Carla and Kevin Fox. He was raised at his family's soy bean farm in Thamesville, Ontario alongside his sister Megan and brother Trent.

== Career statistics ==
| | | | Regular season | | | | | Playoffs |
| Season | Team | League | GP | G | A | Pts | PIM | GP | G | A | Pts | PIM |
|---|---|---|---|---|---|---|---|---|---|---|---|---|
| 2009–10 | London Knights | OHL | 26 | 1 | 6 | 7 | 13 | 2 | 0 | 1 | 1 | 0 |
| 2010–11 | London Knights | OHL | 51 | 11 | 11 | 22 | 55 | 6 | 1 | 0 | 1 | 6 |
| 2011–12 | London Knights | OHL | 34 | 13 | 19 | 32 | 54 | 0 | 0 | 0 | 0 | 0 |
| 2011–12 | Erie Otters | OHL | 28 | 10 | 12 | 22 | 33 | 0 | 0 | 0 | 0 | 0 |
| 2012–13 | Erie Otters | OHL | 37 | 19 | 17 | 36 | 78 | 0 | 0 | 0 | 0 | 0 |
| 2013–14 | Erie Otters | OHL | 67 | 64 | 43 | 107 | 122 | 14 | 8 | 11 | 19 | 26 |
| 2014–15 | Kalamazoo Wings | ECHL | 70 | 30 | 15 | 45 | 110 | 3 | 0 | 1 | 1 | 4 |
| 2015–16 | Kalamazoo Wings | ECHL | 53 | 26 | 24 | 50 | 87 | — | — | — | — | — |
| 2015–16 | Utica Comets | AHL | 1 | 0 | 0 | 0 | 0 | — | — | — | — | — |
| 2015–16 | Charlotte Checkers | AHL | 1 | 0 | 1 | 1 | 0 | — | — | — | — | — |
| 2016–17 | Missouri Mavericks | ECHL | 71 | 34 | 42 | 76 | 138 | — | — | — | — | — |
| 2017–18 | Thomas Sabo Ice Tigers | DEL | 52 | 16 | 14 | 30 | 58 | 12 | 4 | 5 | 9 | 12 |
| 2018–19 | Thomas Sabo Ice Tigers | DEL | 34 | 6 | 6 | 12 | 53 | 7 | 1 | 1 | 2 | 16 |
| 2019–20 | Frederikshavn White Hawks | DEN | 48 | 24 | 35 | 59 | 116 | — | — | — | — | — |
| 2020–21 | Nürnberg Ice Tigers | DEL | 35 | 8 | 5 | 13 | 40 | — | — | — | — | — |
| 2021–22 | Nürnberg Ice Tigers | DEL | 52 | 19 | 20 | 39 | 78 | 3 | 3 | 0 | 3 | 2 |
| 2022–23 | Nürnberg Ice Tigers | DEL | 55 | 18 | 21 | 39 | 64 | 2 | 0 | 0 | 0 | 2 |
| 2023–24 | Nürnberg Ice Tigers | DEL | 50 | 8 | 18 | 26 | 59 | 2 | 0 | 0 | 0 | 36 |
| DEL totals | | | 278 | 75 | 84 | 159 | 352 | 26 | 8 | 6 | 14 | 68 |

== Awards and honours ==
| Award | Year |
|---|---|
OHL
| Most Goals Scored (64) | 2013–14 |
| Leo Lalonde Memorial Trophy - OHL Overage Player of Year | 2013–14 |
| First All-Star Team | 2013–14 |
