= Scott Kosmachuk =

Canadian ice hockey player (born 1994)

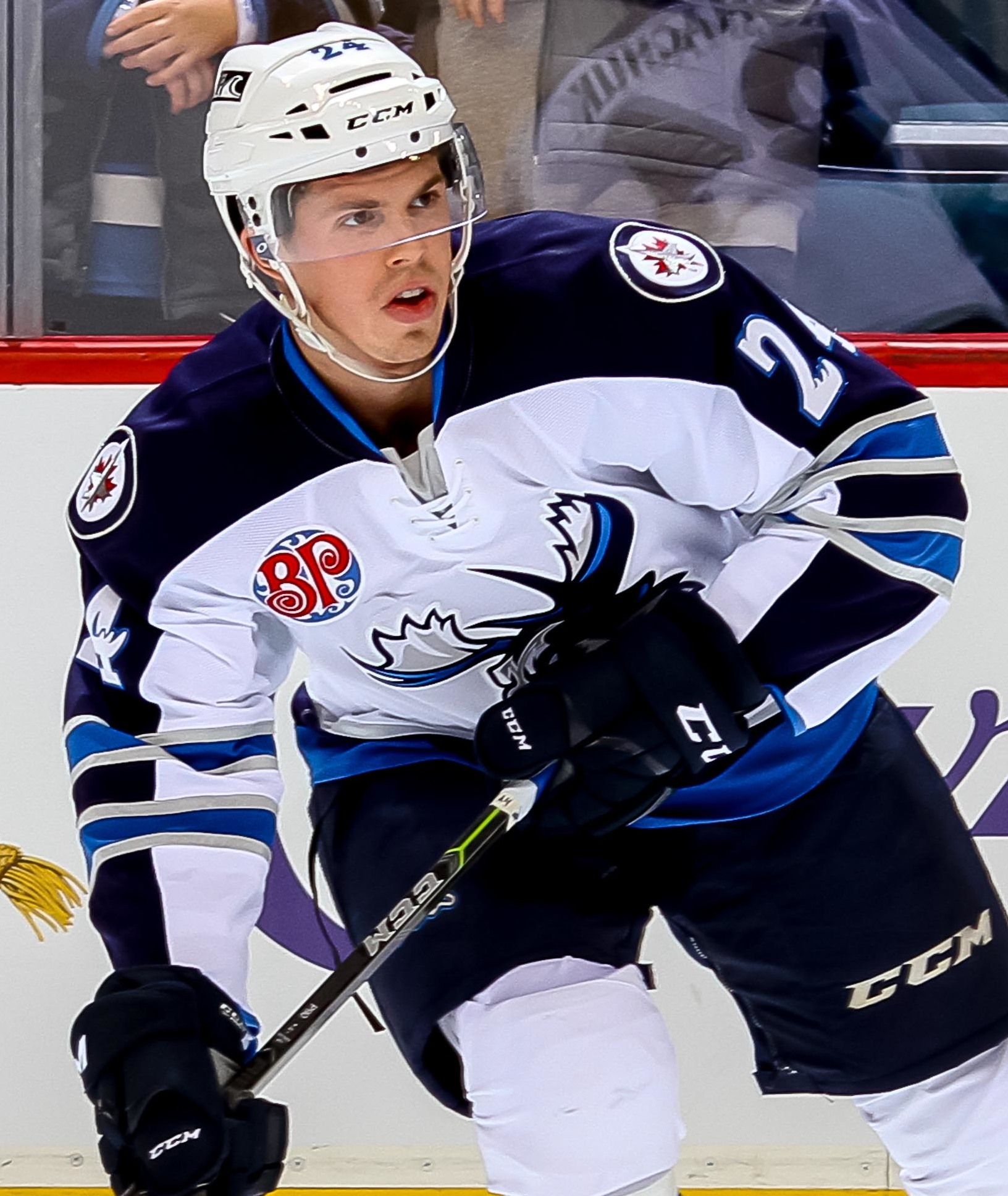
- Kosmachuk with the Manitoba Moose during the 2015-16 season
- Born: January 24, 1994 (age 32) Richmond Hill, Ontario, Canada
- Height: 5 ft 11 in (180 cm)
- Weight: 185 lb (84 kg; 13 st 3 lb)
- Position: Right wing
- Shoots: Right
- ICEHL team Former teams: Vienna Capitals; Winnipeg Jets; Hartford Wolf Pack; Colorado Eagles; Augsburger Panther; EC VSV; HC TPS; Lada Togliatti; EC Red Bull Salzburg; Vlci Žilina
- NHL draft: 70th overall, 2012; Winnipeg Jets
- Playing career: 2014–present

Scott Kosmachuk (born January 24, 1994) is a Canadian professional ice hockey forward who currently plays for the Vienna Capitals of the ICE Hockey League (ICEHL). He was originally drafted 70th overall in the 2012 NHL entry draft by the Winnipeg Jets.

== Playing career ==
Kosmachuk was born and raised in the Greater Toronto Area and played junior hockey with the Ontario Hockey League's Guelph Storm. In his fourth and final season with the Storm, Kosmachuk finished third in league scoring with 101 points and helped lead the team to the OHL championship. The Storm advanced as far as the 2014 Memorial Cup final, which they lost to the Edmonton Oil Kings.

The Winnipeg Jets drafted Kosmachuk in the third round of the 2012 NHL entry draft and returned him to the Storm for his final two years of junior eligibility. After attending his first training camp with the Jets in 2014, Kosmachuk was assigned to the St. John's IceCaps, the Jets' American Hockey League affiliate for the 2014–15 season. The IceCaps relocated to Winnipeg the following summer, where Kosmachuk played the next season with the Manitoba Moose.

During the 2015–16 season, on March 8, 2016, the Jets recalled Kosmachuk on an emergency basis to replace the injured Joel Armia. With the Jets out of playoff contention, he made his NHL debut that evening against the Nashville Predators. In his third game, he recorded his first NHL point, making the game-winning assist in a 3-2 victory over the Colorado Avalanche on March 13, 2016.

After the 2016–17 season, Kosmachuk was not tendered a qualifying offer by the Jets, releasing him to free agency. On September 13, 2017, Kosmachuk agreed to a one-year AHL contract with the Hartford Wolf Pack. He was also invited to partake in the training camp of the Wolf Pack's NHL parent affiliate, the New York Rangers. After attending the Rangers training camp, Kosmachuk was returned to the Wolf Pack to begin the 2017–18 season. Used in a top-six offensive role, Kosmachuk rebounded offensively ranking second on the team with 15 goals and 42 points in 70 games.

On July 2, 2018, as a free agent, Kosmachuk agreed to a one-year, two-way contract with the Colorado Avalanche. In the 2018–19 season, Kosmachuk played exclusively with the Avalanche's affiliate, the Colorado Eagles, during their inaugural season in the AHL. Among the Eagles' top-9 forwards, Kosmachuk posted 12 goals and 23 points in 54 games. As an impending free agent, Kosmachuk's expiring NHL rights were included in a trade by the Avalanche, along with 2020 second and third-round picks, to the Washington Capitals in exchange for André Burakovsky on June 28, 2019.

An unsigned free agent over the summer, Kosmachuk belatedly signed abroad during the 2019–20 season, agreeing to a contract with the German club Augsburger Panther of the DEL, on November 21, 2019. Following the season, Kosmachuk remained in Europe, continuing in the neighbouring ICE Hockey League with EC VSV.

On June 9, 2022, Kosmachuk signed with HC TPS of the Liiga for the following 2022–23 season. After contributing offensively with TPS, notching 17 points through 29 regular season games, Kosmachuk left Finland as a free agent and secured a one-year deal with reinstated KHL club HC Lada Togliatti, on July 24, 2023.

== International play ==
Medal record

Ice hockey

Representing Canada

IIHF World U18 Championship
Bronze medal – third place	2012 Czech Republic	

Kosmachuk was selected to play for Team Canada at the 2012 IIHF World U18 Championships in the Czech Republic.

== Career statistics ==
=== Regular season and playoffs ===
			Regular season					Playoffs
Season	Team	League	GP	G	A	Pts	PIM	GP	G	A	Pts	PIM
2009–10	Toronto Marlboros	GTMMHL	80	33	40	73	108	—	—	—	—	—
2010–11	Guelph Storm	OHL	68	6	15	21	25	6	1	0	1	5
2011–12	Guelph Storm	OHL	67	30	29	59	110	6	2	3	5	12
2012–13	Guelph Storm	OHL	68	35	30	65	105	5	1	0	1	13
2013–14	Guelph Storm	OHL	68	49	52	101	83	20	10	18	28	27
2014–15	St. John's IceCaps	AHL	70	14	14	28	62	—	—	—	—	—
2015–16	Manitoba Moose	AHL	67	19	17	36	41	—	—	—	—	—
2015–16	Winnipeg Jets	NHL	8	0	3	3	2	—	—	—	—	—
2016–17	Manitoba Moose	AHL	58	11	17	28	47	—	—	—	—	—
2017–18	Hartford Wolf Pack	AHL	70	15	27	42	77	—	—	—	—	—
2018–19	Colorado Eagles	AHL	54	12	11	23	47	4	0	0	0	6
2019–20	Augsburger Panther	DEL	32	10	15	25	22	—	—	—	—	—
2020–21	EC VSV	ICEHL	44	19	24	43	34	4	1	2	3	11
2021–22	EC VSV	ICEHL	46	26	24	50	42	12	7	6	13	16
2022–23	HC TPS	Liiga	29	9	8	17	22	—	—	—	—	—
2023–24	Lada Togliatti	KHL	41	9	15	24	28	5	1	2	3	6
2024–25	EC Red Bull Salzburg	ICEHL	26	11	16	27	41	13	2	2	4	11
NHL totals			8	0	3	3	2	—	—	—	—	—

=== International ===
Year	Team	Event	Result	GP	G	A	Pts	PIM
2012	Canada	WJC18	3rd place, bronze medalist(s)	7	0	0	0	4
Junior totals				7	0	0	0	4
