= Eric Cornel =

Canadian professional ice hockey centre

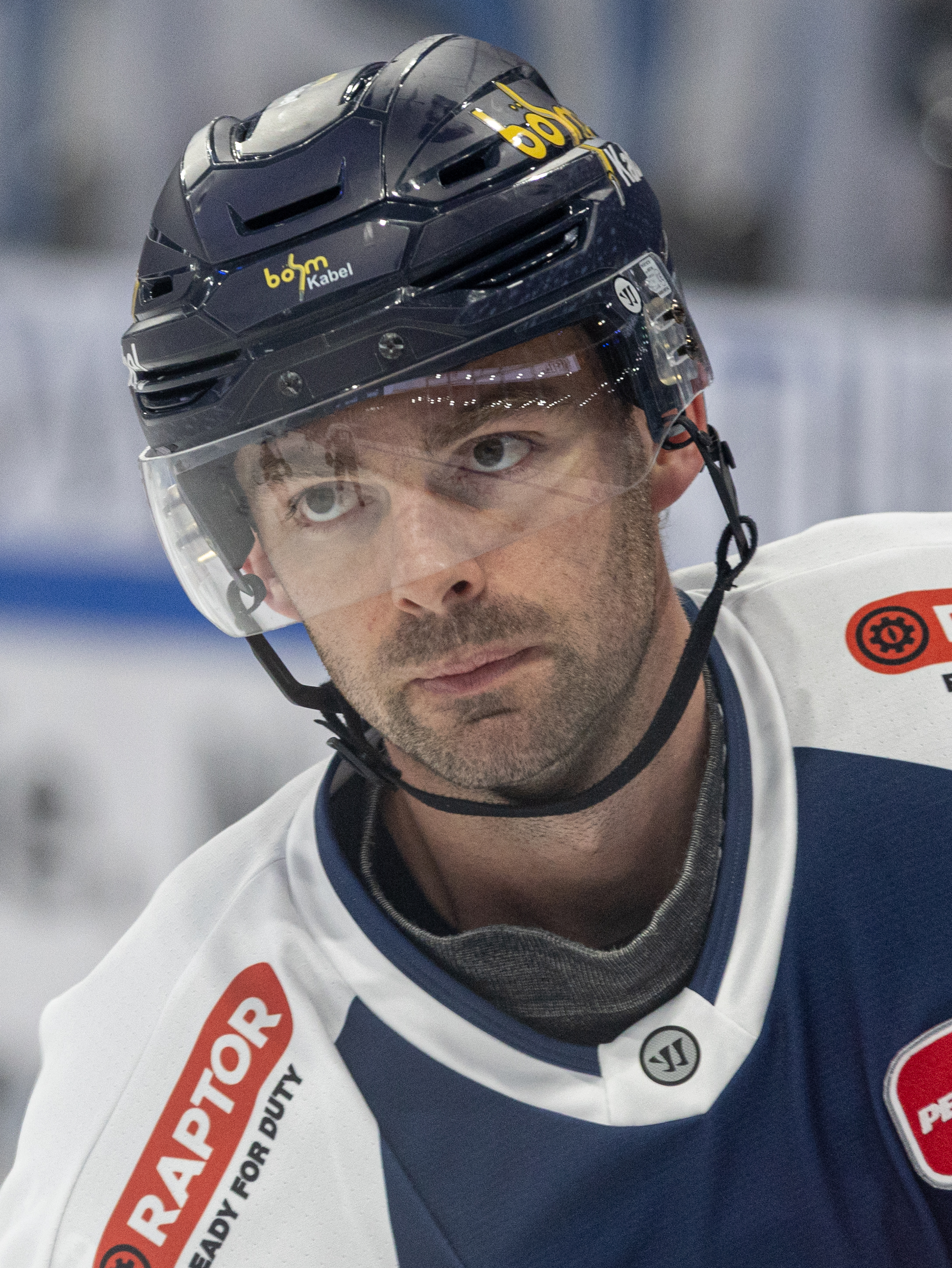
- Cornel in 2025
- Born: April 11, 1996 (age 30) Kemptville, Ontario, Canada
- Height: 6 ft 2 in (188 cm)
- Weight: 198 lb (90 kg; 14 st 2 lb)
- Position: Centre
- Shoots: Right
- DEL team Former teams: Iserlohn Roosters; Rochester Americans; Nürnberg Ice Tigers
- NHL draft: 44th overall, 2014; Buffalo Sabres
- Playing career: 2015–present

Eric Cornel (born April 11, 1996) is a Canadian professional ice hockey centre who currently plays for the Iserlohn Roosters of the Deutsche Eishockey Liga (DEL).

== Playing career ==
Following the conclusion of his entry-level deal with the Sabres, on June 25, 2019, Cornel was not tendered a qualifying offer by Buffalo, releasing him to free agency.

Following the completion of his fifth season with the Rochester Americans in the American Hockey League, having made 277 appearances for 78 points, Cornel left the club as a free agent. With the following North American season delayed due to the COVID-19 pandemic, Cornel opted to sign his first contract abroad in agreeing to a one-year contract with German outfit, the Nürnberg Ice Tigers of the DEL for the 2020–21 season, on November 27, 2020.

On July 14, 2021, Cornel left the Ice Tigers but continued in the DEL by signing a two-year contract with the Iserlohn Roosters.

== Career statistics ==
=== Regular season and playoffs ===
			Regular season					Playoffs
Season	Team	League	GP	G	A	Pts	PIM	GP	G	A	Pts	PIM
2011–12	Kemptville 73's	CCHL	8	1	3	4	0	—	—	—	—	—
2012–13	Peterborough Petes	OHL	63	4	12	16	13	—	—	—	—	—
2013–14	Peterborough Petes	OHL	68	25	37	62	25	11	4	3	7	4
2014–15	Peterborough Petes	OHL	66	14	38	52	35	5	0	1	1	2
2014–15	Rochester Americans	AHL	6	0	1	1	0	—	—	—	—	—
2015–16	Peterborough Petes	OHL	68	27	56	83	18	7	1	4	5	4
2015–16	Rochester Americans	AHL	6	0	1	1	2	—	—	—	—	—
2016–17	Rochester Americans	AHL	67	5	9	14	29	—	—	—	—	—
2017–18	Rochester Americans	AHL	61	9	9	18	25	2	0	0	0	0
2018–19	Rochester Americans	AHL	76	9	13	22	34	1	0	0	0	0
2019–20	Rochester Americans	AHL	61	12	10	22	6	—	—	—	—	—
2020–21	Nürnberg Ice Tigers	DEL	36	7	9	16	0	—	—	—	—	—
2021–22	Iserlohn Roosters	DEL	52	17	26	43	16	—	—	—	—	—
2022–23	Iserlohn Roosters	DEL	56	18	17	35	10	—	—	—	—	—
2023–24	Iserlohn Roosters	DEL	52	7	20	27	10	—	—	—	—	—
2024–25	Iserlohn Roosters	DEL	52	6	22	28	12	—	—	—	—	—
AHL totals			277	35	43	78	96	3	0	0	0	0

=== International ===
Year	Team	Event	Result	GP	G	A	Pts	PIM
2013	Canada Ontario	U17	6th	5	0	3	3	0
Junior totals				5	0	3	3	0
