= Dylan Blujus =

American ice hockey player (born 1994)

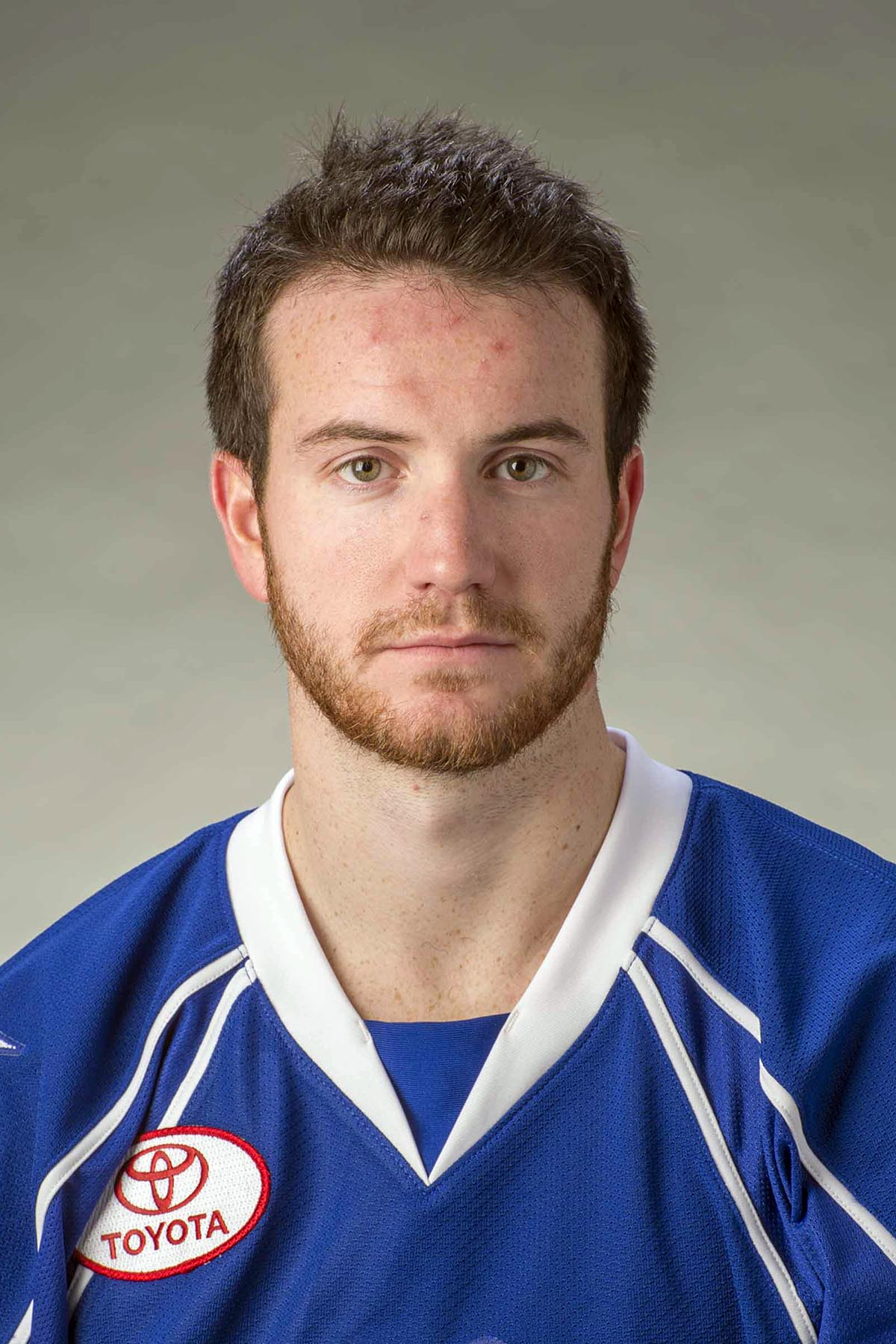
- Blujus in 2016
- Born: January 22, 1994 (age 32) Buffalo, New York, U.S.
- Height: 6 ft 3 in (191 cm)
- Weight: 207 lb (94 kg; 14 st 11 lb)
- Position: Defense
- Shot: Right
- Played for: Syracuse Crunch; Utica Comets; Rochester Americans; Milwaukee Admirals; Belleville Senators
- NHL draft: 40th overall, 2012; Tampa Bay Lightning
- Playing career: 2014–2023

Dylan Blujus (born January 22, 1994) is an American former professional ice hockey defenseman. He is currently a linesperson for the American Hockey League.

== Playing career ==
Blujus originally played major junior hockey with the Brampton Battalion in the Ontario Hockey League (OHL). Following his second season with the Battalion in 2011–12, contributing 7 goals and 34 points in 66 games, Blujus was selected by the Tampa Bay Lightning in the second round, 40th overall, in the 2012 NHL entry draft.

In his fourth and final junior season in 2013–14, moving with the Battalion franchise to North Bay, Blujus recorded 30 points in 50 games from the blueline. Helping the Battalion reach the OHL finals against the Guelph Storm, he registered a career high 4 goals and 10 post-season points in 22 games. On May 22, 2014, Blujus was signed to a three-year, entry-level contract with the Tampa Bay Lightning.

Blujus played the duration of his entry-level contract primarily with the Lightning's AHL affiliate, the Syracuse Crunch. In his final season under contract with the Lightning in the 2016–17 season, Blujus was limited to just 28 games through injury. Unable to progress up the depth chart with Tampa Bay, he was not tendered a qualifying offer at the conclusion of his contract, becoming a free agent.

Un-signed over the following summer, Blujus agreed to begin the 2017–18 season in the ECHL, joining the Jacksonville Icemen on October 14, 2017. In a top-pairing role, Blujus registered 7 points through 21 games before returning to the AHL in securing a professional try-out contract with the Utica Comets, affiliate to the Vancouver Canucks, on December 13, 2017. Enjoying a successful loan period, contributing with 8 points in 14 games from the blueline, Blujus was signed to an AHL contract for the remainder of the season with Utica on January 17, 2018. Enjoying a rebound season with the Comets, Blujus was signed to a one-year contract extension with the club on June 7, 2018.

In the 2018–19 season, adding a veteran presence Blujus collected 8 points through 43 games, he agreed to return for his third season with the Comets, signing a one-year contract extension on June 17, 2019.

As a free agent entering the pandemic-delayed 2020–21 season, Blujus opted to stay close to home in signing a one-year contract with his third AHL club, the Rochester Americans on January 18, 2021. In 21 games from the blueline with the Americans, Blujus contributed with 2 points.

On September 17, 2021, Blujus was signed as a free agent to a one-year contract to continue in the AHL with the Milwaukee Admirals. In the 2021–22 season, Blujus appeared in 43 regular season games contributing with 11 points. He was loaned briefly to the ECHL with the Florida Everblades before returning to the Admirals and making 7 playoff appearances.

As a free agent, Blujus left the Admirals and returned for a second tenure with the Utica Comets on July 18, 2022. Blujus made 19 appearances with the Comet in the 2022–23 season before he was traded by the Comets to the Belleville Senators in exchange for future considerations on March 10, 2023.

== Career statistics ==
			Regular season					Playoffs
Season	Team	League	GP	G	A	Pts	PIM	GP	G	A	Pts	PIM
2009–10	Buffalo Regals	T1EHL	48	5	17	22	36	4	0	0	0	0
2010–11	Brampton Battalion	OHL	67	4	22	26	26	4	0	0	0	0
2011–12	Brampton Battalion	OHL	66	7	27	34	38	8	1	4	5	4
2012–13	Brampton Battalion	OHL	68	2	27	29	57	5	2	2	4	2
2013–14	North Bay Battalion	OHL	55	4	26	30	56	22	4	6	10	20
2014–15	Syracuse Crunch	AHL	67	4	18	22	18	3	0	0	0	4
2015–16	Syracuse Crunch	AHL	61	6	13	19	33	—	—	—	—	—
2016–17	Syracuse Crunch	AHL	23	1	7	8	16	1	0	0	0	2
2017–18	Jacksonville Icemen	ECHL	21	1	6	7	20	—	—	—	—	—
2017–18	Utica Comets	AHL	45	4	12	16	24	5	0	2	2	8
2018–19	Utica Comets	AHL	43	1	7	8	41	—	—	—	—	—
2019–20	Utica Comets	AHL	35	4	5	9	26	—	—	—	—	—
2020–21	Rochester Americans	AHL	21	1	1	2	14	—	—	—	—	—
2021–22	Milwaukee Admirals	AHL	43	1	10	11	30	7	0	0	0	12
2021–22	Florida Everblades	ECHL	6	0	1	1	10	—	—	—	—	—
2022–23	Utica Comets	AHL	19	1	4	5	14	—	—	—	—	—
2022–23	Belleville Senators	AHL	5	0	0	0	2	—	—	—	—	—
AHL totals			362	23	77	100	218	16	0	2	2	26
