= Victor Crus Rydberg =

Swedish ice hockey player

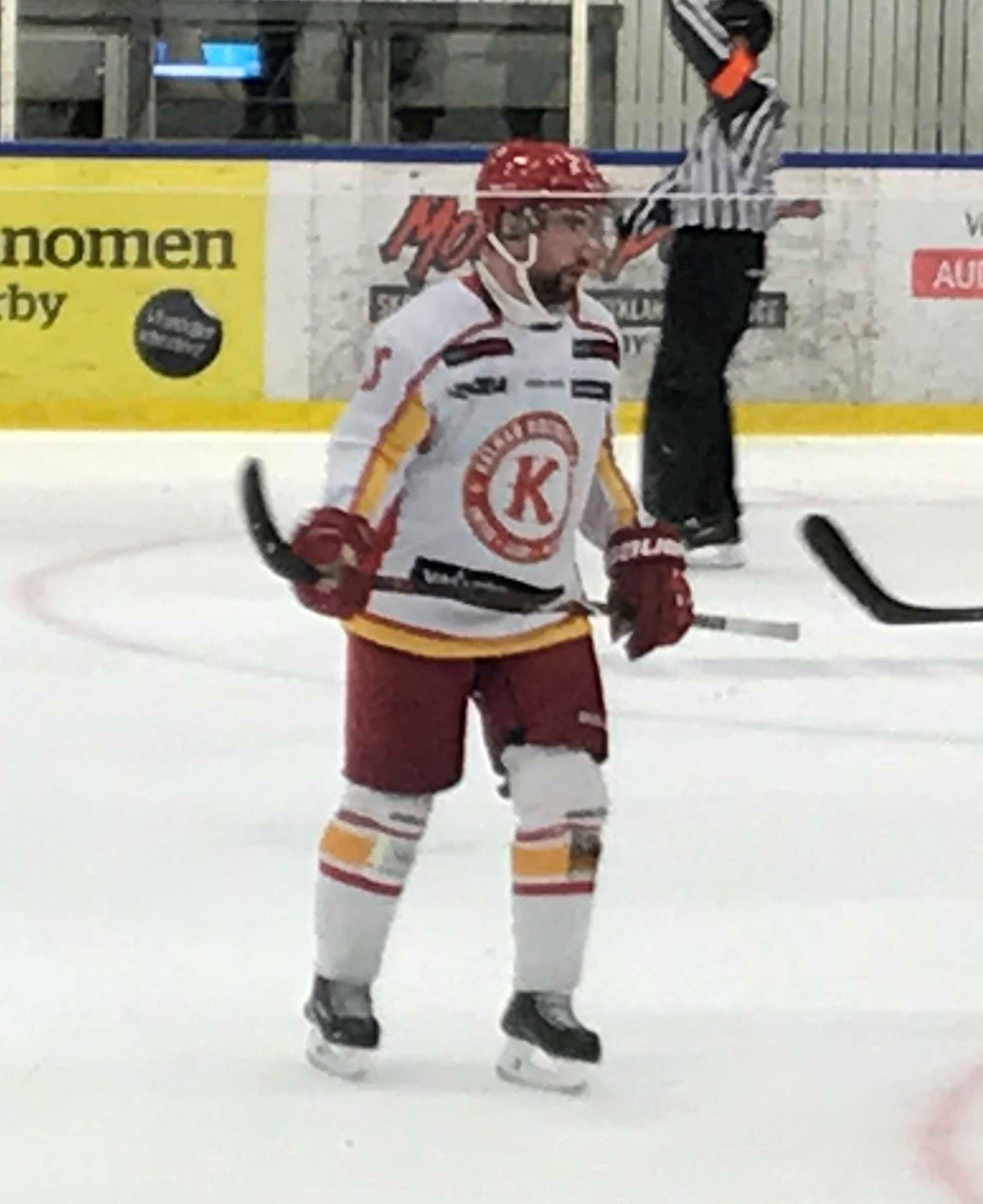
- Born: March 21, 1995 (age 31) Växjö, Sweden
- Height: 5 ft 11 in (180 cm)
- Weight: 203 lb (92 kg; 14 st 7 lb)
- Position: Centre
- Shoots: Right
- Div.1 team Former teams: Kalmar HC; Linköpings HC; Bridgeport Sound Tigers
- NHL draft: 136th overall, 2013; New York Islanders
- Playing career: 2013–present

Victor Crus Rydberg (born March 21, 1995) is a Swedish ice hockey player. He is currently playing with the Kalmar HC of the Hockeyettan (Division.1). He previously played originally with Linköpings in the Swedish J20 SuperElit and Elitserien. Rydberg was selected by the New York Islanders in the 5th round (136th overall) of the 2013 NHL entry draft.

== Playing career ==
He made his Elitserien debut playing with Linköpings HC during the 2012–13 Elitserien season. After his first major junior North American season in 2013–14 with the Plymouth Whalers of the Ontario Hockey League, Rydberg joined Islanders' affiliate, the Bridgeport Sound Tigers on an amateur try-out for the remainder of the year on March 31, 2014.

At the conclusion of his major junior career with the Whalers, Cruc Rydberg returned to Sweden in signing with HockeyAllsvenskan club, HC Vita Hästen. In the 2015–16 season, Rydberg contributed with 8 goals and 12 points in 45 games. In the following off-season, Rydberg as a free agent opted to continue his playing career in the third-tier Hockeyettan with Vimmerby HC on June 23, 2016.

== Career statistics ==
=== Regular season and playoffs ===
			Regular season					Playoffs
Season	Team	League	GP	G	A	Pts	PIM	GP	G	A	Pts	PIM
2009–10	Tingsryds AIF	J20	2	0	0	0	0	—	—	—	—	—
2010–11	Tingsryds AIF	J20	30	6	9	15	8	—	—	—	—	—
2011–12	Linköping HC	J20	10	0	2	2	6
2012–13	Linköping HC	J20	35	12	23	35	24	4	2	0	2	0
2012–13	Linköping HC	SEL	1	0	0	0	0	—	—	—	—	—
2013–14	Plymouth Whalers	OHL	62	12	25	37	20	5	1	2	3	6
2013–14	Bridgeport Sound Tigers	AHL	7	0	0	0	0	—	—	—	—	—
2014–15	Plymouth Whalers	OHL	55	15	30	45	34	—	—	—	—	—
2015–16	HC Vita Hästen	Allsv	45	8	4	12	14	—	—	—	—	—
2016–17	Vimmerby HC	Div.1	36	10	6	16	39	7	1	0	1	2
2017–18	Kalmar HC	Div.2	35	18	22	40	6	13	4	10	14	4
2018–19	Kalmar HC	Div.1	31	7	10	17	12	—	—	—	—	—
2019–20	Kalmar HC	Div.1	37	14	26	40	10	—	—	—	—	—
2019–20	Nybro Vikings IF	Div.1	2	1	1	2	2	5	2	2	4	0
2020–21	Kalmar HC	Div.1	25	12	17	29	14	—	—	—	—	—
SHL totals			1	0	0	0	0	—	—	—	—	—

=== International ===
Year	Team	Event	Result	GP	G	A	Pts	PIM
2012	Sweden	IH18	3rd place, bronze medalist(s)	5	2	3	5	0
2013	Sweden	WJC18	5th	4	0	1	1	8
Junior totals				9	2	4	6	8
