= Semyon Babintsev =

Russian ice hockey player (born 1994)

- Born: 8 October 1994 (age 31) Moscow, Russia
- Height: 6 ft 0 in (183 cm)
- Weight: 190 lb (86 kg; 13 st 8 lb)
- Position: Right wing
- Shot: Left
- Played for: Nomad Astana; HC Sochi; HC Litvínov; Utah Grizzlies; Newfoundland Growlers; Podhale Nowy Targ; Fort Wayne Komets
- NHL draft: Undrafted
- Playing career: 2015–2022

Semyon Sergeyevich Babintsev (Russian: Семен Сергеевич Бабинцев; born 8 October 1994) is a Russian former professional ice hockey right winger who played for the Fort Wayne Komets of the ECHL.

== Playing career ==
Babintsev played three seasons at junior level with the Mississauga Steelheads of the Ontario Hockey League before joining Nomad Astana of the Kazakhstan Hockey Championship in 2015. In the 2016–17 season, Babintsev played in the Kontinental Hockey League for HC Sochi and in the Czech Extraliga for HC Litvínov.

After a spell with Sokol Krasnoyarsk of the Supreme Hockey League, Babintsev signed for the Utah Grizzlies of the ECHL on 13 February 2018. On 14 August 2018, Babintsev signed with ECHL expansion team the Newfoundland Growlers. He was released from the team on 11 March 2019.

Following two seasons in China and Poland, Babintsev returned to North America and the ECHL, linking up with defending champions the Fort Wayne Komets on 26 August 2021.
