= Kulda =

Family name

Origin
- Origin: Latvian

Kulda is a Latvian surname. Individuals with the surname include:

- Artūrs Kulda (born 1988), Latvian ice hockey player
- Edgars Kulda (born 1994), Latvian ice hockey player
