= Blake Orban =

Canadian-Hungarian ice hockey defenceman

- Born: 28 January 1994 (age 32) Calgary, Alberta, Canada
- Height: 6 ft 1 in (185 cm)
- Weight: 199 lb (90 kg; 14 st 3 lb)
- Position: Defence
- Shot: Right
- Played for: MAC Budapest
- Playing career: 2019–2021

Blake Orban (born 28 January 1994) is a Canadian-Hungarian former professional ice hockey defenceman. He played professional hockey in Central Europe for MAC Budapest within the Slovak Tipsport Liga and the multinational Erste Liga. At the junior tier, he captured both a Western Hockey League (WHL) title and the Memorial Cup national championship as a member of the Edmonton Oil Kings.

== Playing career ==
=== Junior ===
Orban began his major junior development in the Western Hockey League (WHL) after being drafted 65th overall by the Vancouver Giants. He skated for parts of four seasons with the Giants from 2010 to 2014, establishing himself as a physical, stay-at-home presence on the back end.

In January 2014, mid-way through the 2013–14 WHL season, Orban was acquired by the Edmonton Oil Kings to serve as a reliable depth piece for their postseason championship aspirations. He made 29 regular-season appearances for Edmonton down the stretch, followed by 16 playoff games as the Oil Kings captured the Ed Chynoweth Cup as WHL champions. The team advanced to the 2014 Memorial Cup national tournament in London, Ontario, where Orban and the Oil Kings defeated the Guelph Storm in the championship game to claim the Canadian Hockey League title. Orban returned to Edmonton for an overage senior season in 2014–15, logging an alternate captaincy role and posting a junior career-high 25 points in 72 games.

=== Collegiate ===
Following his junior career, Orban opted to use his CHL scholarship packages to pursue university hockey in Canada. He committed to the University of Lethbridge, joining the Pronghorns men's ice hockey program in U Sports. He played four full seasons of Canadian university hockey from 2015 to 2019, appearing in 97 career games for Lethbridge while anchoring their primary penalty-killing units and shutdown pairings.

=== Professional ===
Upon wrapping up his collegiate timeline, Orban signed his first professional contract overseas ahead of the 2019–20 season, traveling to Europe to join Hungarian club MAC Budapest (then competing as MAC Újbuda). The move allowed him to skate alongside his cousin, forward Brance Orban.

During his rookie professional campaign, Orban played at the highest level in Slovakia, competing within the Tipsport Liga against regional rivals such as DVTK Jegesmedvék. He skated in 45 regular-season games for the club, recording two goals and eight assists from the blue line. Following a structural league shift for the organization, Orban transferred to DEAC of the multinational Erste Liga for the 2020–21 tournament schedule, where he made an additional 25 professional appearances before concluding his stint abroad.

== Career statistics ==
=== Regular season and playoffs ===
			Regular season					Playoffs				
Season	Team	League	GP	G	A	Pts	PIM	GP	G	A	Pts	PIM
2011–12	Vancouver Giants	WHL	43	1	3	4	67	6	0	0	0	2
2012–13	Vancouver Giants	WHL	67	4	10	14	120	—	—	—	—	—
2013–14	Vancouver Giants	WHL	38	4	11	15	75	—	—	—	—	—
2013–14	Edmonton Oil Kings	WHL	29	1	6	7	62	16	0	2	2	17
2014–15	Edmonton Oil Kings	WHL	72	6	19	25	113	5	1	1	2	4
2015–16	U. of Lethbridge	U Sports	26	3	14	17	36	—	—	—	—	—
2016–17	U. of Lethbridge	U Sports	28	0	10	10	64	—	—	—	—	—
2017–18	U. of Lethbridge	U Sports	28	3	12	15	62	—	—	—	—	—
2018–19	U. of Lethbridge	U Sports	25	1	5	6	30	—	—	—	—	—
2019–20	MAC Budapest	Slovak	45	2	8	10	58	—	—	—	—	—
2020–21	DEAC	Erste	25	1	4	5	—	—	—	—	—	—
