= Tyler Bertuzzi =

Canadian ice hockey player (born 1995)

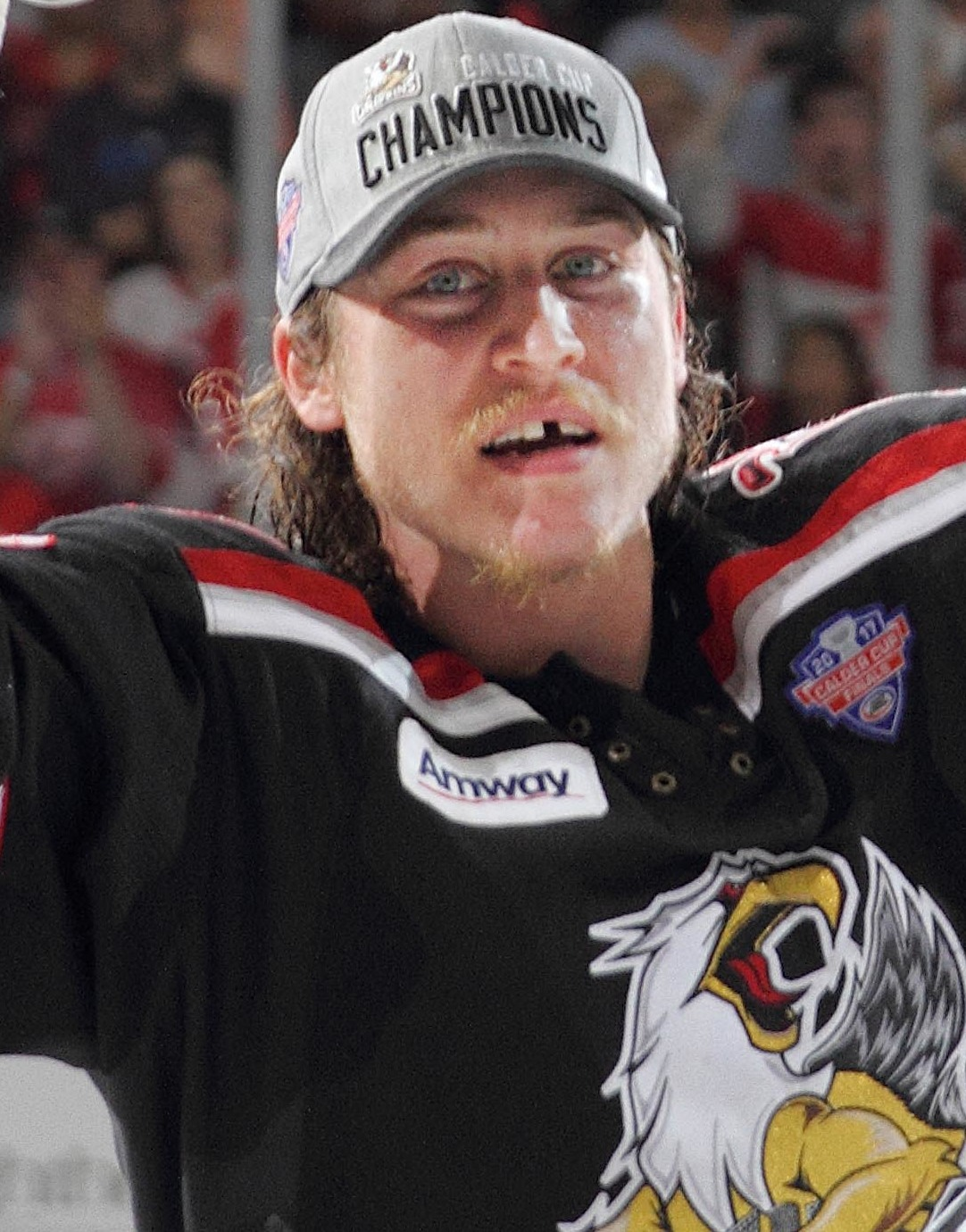
- Bertuzzi with the Grand Rapids Griffins in 2017
- Born: February 24, 1995 (age 31) Sudbury, Ontario, Canada
- Height: 6 ft 2 in (188 cm)
- Weight: 200 lb (91 kg; 14 st 4 lb)
- Position: Left wing
- Shoots: Left
- NHL team Former teams: Chicago Blackhawks; Detroit Red Wings; Boston Bruins; Toronto Maple Leafs
- National team: Canada
- NHL draft: 58th overall, 2013; Detroit Red Wings
- Playing career: 2015–present

Tyler Bertuzzi (born February 24, 1995) is a Canadian professional ice hockey player who is a left winger and alternate captain for the Chicago Blackhawks of the National Hockey League (NHL). Bertuzzi was drafted 58th overall by the Detroit Red Wings in the 2013 NHL entry draft. He has also previously played for the Boston Bruins and Toronto Maple Leafs.

== Playing career ==
=== Junior ===
Bertuzzi was drafted by the Guelph Storm of the Ontario Hockey League (OHL) in the fourth round, 78th overall, of the 2011 OHL entry draft. In his first full year in the OHL with Guelph during the 2011–12 season, Bertuzzi played in 61 games, scoring six goals. He had six fights in his first nine games, becoming known as someone who played tough. Bertuzzi played in all six of Guelph's playoff games, finishing the series with two assists.

During the 2012–13 season, Bertuzzi had 13 goals and had nine assists in 43 games. Bertuzzi played in all five playoff games with Guelph, finishing with no points and 14 penalty minutes. He missed 25 to games to shoulder, neck and head injuries. During the 2013–14 season, Bertuzzi only played in 29 games, missing significant time with the same injuries to his head, neck and shoulder that were aggravated in a game on December 8, 2013. He finished the season with 10 goals and 25 assists, rejoining the Storm in the playoffs capture the J. Ross Robertson Cup as OHL champions. Guelph played 18 playoff games, with Bertuzzi playing in all, scoring ten goals, seven assists, and a +24 rating. As champions, the Storm were invited to the Canadian Hockey League's 2014 Memorial Cup tournament. Bertuzzi led the Memorial Cup with five goals in four games, as the Storm made the final, but lost to the Edmonton Oil Kings to finish second in the tournament.

During the 2014–15 season, Bertuzzi was named an assistant captain of the Storm. He had his best season of his junior career, leading Guelph in scoring with 98 points while playing in all of the team's 68 games, finishing tenth in the league in scoring. Through nine games in the playoffs, Bertuzzi tied the team in scoring with six goals and eight points. Bertuzzi was named to the OHL's Second All-Star Team in 2015.

=== Professional ===
==== Detroit Red Wings (2014–2023) ====
Bertuzzi was selected by the Detroit Red Wings of the National Hockey League (NHL) in the second round, 58th overall, in the 2013 NHL entry draft. On October 17, 2014, the Red Wings signed Bertuzzi to a three-year entry-level contract. After finishing his season with Guelph Storm, Bertuzzi was assigned to Detroit's American Hockey League (AHL) affiliate, the Grand Rapids Griffins, to finish the 2014–15 season. He made his professional debut for the Griffins on April 17, 2015, in a game against the Lake Erie Monsters and scored his first professional goal against goaltender Calvin Pickard. He played in two regular season games with Grand Rapids. The Griffins made the 2015 Calder Cup playoffs and he played in 14 playoff games, adding seven goals and 12 points.

In his first full professional season, Bertuzzi was assigned to Grand Rapids for the 2015–16 season. On October 31, he was suspended two games by the AHL for a slew foot infraction against Kasperi Kapanen of the Toronto Marlies. He finished the season playing 71 games with Grand Rapids, scoring 12 goals and 30 points. The Griffins made the 2016 Calder Cup playoffs and he added seven goals and eight points in nine playoff games. He was assigned to Grand Rapids to start the 2016–17 season and played in nine games scoring two goals and two assists. On November 7, 2016, Bertuzzi was recalled by the Detroit Red Wings after Thomas Vanek was placed on injured reserve. He made his NHL debut the next day in a 3–2 victory over the Philadelphia Flyers. On November 15, Bertuzzi was returned to Grand Rapids after appearing in three games for the Red Wings, going scoreless. Bertuzzi was recalled by the Red Wings on November 17. He remained with Detroit until December 28 when he was returned to the AHL, appearing in four games, going scoreless, but had not played since November 29 due to an injured ankle. Bertuzzi recorded 12 goals and 25 assists in 48 games for Grand Rapids during the regular season. During the 2017 Calder Cup playoffs, he recorded nine goals and 10 assists in 19 games, to help lead the Griffins to the Calder Cup, and was awarded the Jack A. Butterfield Trophy as the most valuable player. He set the Griffins' franchise record with 23 career playoff goals.

He missed the entire 2017 preseason with inflammation in his wrist and the entire first month of the 2017–18 season, missing nine games in total. He was recalled by the Red Wings for the first time on December 8 to replace an injured David Booth. He made his NHL season debut on December 9 in a 6–1 loss to the St. Louis Blues. He was returned to Grand Rapids on December 12. He recorded seven goals and seven assists in 16 games for the Griffins prior to being recalled by Detroit on December 21. He recorded his first NHL point assisting on Justin Abdelkader's goal in a 3–1 loss to the New Jersey Devils on December 27. Bertuzzi recorded his first career NHL goal against Jeff Glass of the Chicago Blackhawks on January 14, 2018. During the 2017–18 NHL season he recorded seven goals and 17 assists in 48 games for the Red Wings.

On June 25, 2018, the Red Wings signed Bertuzzi to a two-year contract extension. He made the Red Wings' opening night roster out of training camp, scoring in the season opener versus the Columbus Blue Jackets on October 4. On January 12, 2019, Bertuzzi recorded his first career hat-trick against Devan Dubnyk of the Minnesota Wild. Bertuzzi was named the NHL Second Star of the week, for the week ending April 1. He shared the league lead with three goals and seven assists in four games. He registered three straight three-point performances, posting two goals and one assist, including his first career overtime goal, in a 5–4 victory over the Buffalo Sabres on March 28, one goal and two assists in a 4–0 victory over the New Jersey Devils on March 29 and three assists in a 6–3 victory over the Boston Bruins on March 31. Bertuzzi became the first Detroit player to record three consecutive three-point games since Steve Yzerman in 1992–93. On April 2, Bertuzzi recorded two goals and one assist in a 4–1 victory over the Pittsburgh Penguins. He became the first player in Red Wings franchise history to record four consecutive three-point games. He finished the season 21 goals and 47 points in 73 games.

To begin the 2019–20 season, he scored two goals and four points in the season opener playing on the top line with Dylan Larkin and Anthony Mantha in a 5–3 victory over the Nashville Predators on October 5. He was selected to play in the 2020 NHL All-Star Game. He played in 71 games with the Red Wings, scoring 21 goals and 48 points before the NHL suspended the season due to the COVID-19 pandemic on March 12, 2020. A restricted free agent in the off-season, the Red Wings and Bertuzzi could not agree on a contract and opted for salary arbitration. On October 28, Bertuzzi was awarded a one-year, $3.5 million contract by the arbitrator, which the Red Wings signed. In the pandemic-delayed 2020–21 season, he appeared in just nine regular season games, collecting seven points, before he was ruled out for the remainder of the season due to a back injury. It was announced that he underwent back surgery on April 30, 2021. On July 31, the Red Wings signed Bertuzzi to a two-year contract extension.

He began the 2021–22 season with four goals against Andrei Vasilevskiy in a 7–6 opening night loss to the Tampa Bay Lightning in overtime on October 14. He had a second four-point night on November 6 against the Buffalo Sabres, scoring two goals and registering two assists in a 4–3 overtime win. He scored 30 goals and 62 points in 68 games with the Red Wings. During the 2022–23 season, he had his hand broken blocking a shot on October 15 in the second game of the season. He missed a month and returned, but had his left hand broken by a shot from teammate Ben Chiarot on November 30 in a game against the Buffalo Sabres. He was limited to 29 games due to the injuries, recording four goals and ten assists.

==== Boston Bruins (2023) ====
On March 2, 2023, Bertuzzi was traded to the Boston Bruins in exchange for a conditional first-round pick in the 2024 NHL entry draft and a fourth-round pick in the 2025 NHL entry draft. He made his Bruins' debut on March 4 playing on a line with Charlie Coyle and Trent Frederic. The Bruins won the game 4–2 over the New York Rangers and Bertuzzi picked up his first point with the team, assisting on Coyle's first period goal. He scored his first goal for Boston against Jake Allen on March 23 in a 4–2 win over the Montreal Canadiens. He also registered an assist in the game. In 21 regular-season games, Bertuzzi scored four goals and 16 points. The Bruins made the 2023 Stanley Cup playoffs as the top seed in the Eastern Conference, won the Presidents' Trophy by finishing with 135 points, and set an NHL record for most wins, with 65.

Bertuzzi made his NHL playoff debut on April 17 during the Bruins' first round series against the Florida Panthers, assisting on two goals in a 3–1 Game 1 victory. He scored his first NHL playoff goal against Alex Lyon in game 2 on April 19, a 6–3 loss in Game 2. In a Game 4 win, he scored a goal and assisted on a Brad Marchand power play goal. In Game 6, Bertuzzi scored two goals and added an assist in a 7–6 loss. In a winner-take-all Game 7, Bertuzzi scored a power play goal in the third period, but the Bruins ultimately lost in overtime, blowing a 3-1 series lead. Bertuzzi registered five goals and ten points in seven playoff games.

==== Toronto Maple Leafs (2023–2024) ====
Bertuzzi, considered one of the top unrestricted free agents, was signed to a one-year, $5.5 million contract with the Toronto Maple Leafs on July 2. He made his Maple Leafs debut in the 2023–24 season opening 6–5 victory over the Montreal Canadiens on October 11. He scored his first goal for Toronto against Filip Gustavsson in the next game on October 14, a 7–4 victory over the Minnesota Wild. Following the death of professional hockey player Adam Johnson from a skate blade cut to the neck in the middle of a game, Bertuzzi donned a neck guard in a game against the Chicago Blackhawks on November 24, becoming the first active NHL player to wear a neck guard in a game since Johnson's death. He registered three assists in a 7–0 victory over the Pittsburgh Penguins on December 16, tying a career high. He finished the season with 21 goals and 43 points in 80 games for Toronto in the regular season.

The Maple Leafs made the 2024 Stanley Cup playoffs and faced Bertuzzi's former team, the Boston Bruins, in the first round. He scored his only goal of the series in game 3 on April 24, a 4–2 loss to Boston. The Bruins eliminated the Maple Leafs in seven games. In the seven games, Bertuzzi scored the one goal and registered four points.

==== Chicago Blackhawks (2024–present) ====
On July 1, 2024, Bertuzzi signed as an unrestricted free agent to a four-year, $22 million contract with the Chicago Blackhawks.

== International play ==
Medal record

Ice hockey

Representing Canada

World Championships
Silver medal – second place	2019 Slovakia	

On April 29, 2019, Bertuzzi was selected to make his international debut after he was named to the Team Canada roster for the 2019 IIHF World Championship, held in Slovakia. He helped Canada progress through to the playoff rounds before losing the final to Finland to finish with the silver medal on May 26. Bertuzzi finished the tournament going scoreless through five games.

== Personal life ==
Bertuzzi is the son of Angela Bertuzzi, an educational assistant, and Adrian Gedye, a talent agent and businessman. He has two brothers: Evan and Matthew Gedye. His cousins, Tag and Jaden Bertuzzi, also play hockey. Tag was selected second overall by Guelph Storm in the 2017 OHL draft. Bertuzzi is the nephew of former NHL player Todd Bertuzzi.

In September 2021, it came out that Bertuzzi was not vaccinated against COVID-19. As a result, he was not allowed to cross the border to play in Canada and had to surrender more than $450,000 of his $4.75 million salary.

== Career statistics ==
=== Regular season and playoffs ===
			Regular season					Playoffs
Season	Team	League	GP	G	A	Pts	PIM	GP	G	A	Pts	PIM
2011–12	Guelph Storm	OHL	61	6	11	17	117	6	0	2	2	7
2012–13	Guelph Storm	OHL	43	13	9	22	68	5	0	0	0	14
2013–14	Guelph Storm	OHL	29	10	25	35	49	18	10	7	17	24
2014–15	Guelph Storm	OHL	68	43	55	98	91	9	6	2	8	10
2014–15	Grand Rapids Griffins	AHL	2	1	0	1	0	14	7	5	12	10
2015–16	Grand Rapids Griffins	AHL	71	12	18	30	133	9	7	1	8	8
2016–17	Grand Rapids Griffins	AHL	48	12	25	37	37	19	9	10	19	50
2016–17	Detroit Red Wings	NHL	7	0	0	0	0	—	—	—	—	—
2017–18	Grand Rapids Griffins	AHL	16	7	7	14	34	—	—	—	—	—
2017–18	Detroit Red Wings	NHL	48	7	17	24	39	—	—	—	—	—
2018–19	Detroit Red Wings	NHL	73	21	26	47	36	—	—	—	—	—
2019–20	Detroit Red Wings	NHL	71	21	27	48	40	—	—	—	—	—
2020–21	Detroit Red Wings	NHL	9	5	2	7	4	—	—	—	—	—
2021–22	Detroit Red Wings	NHL	68	30	32	62	47	—	—	—	—	—
2022–23	Detroit Red Wings	NHL	29	4	10	14	23	—	—	—	—	—
2022–23	Boston Bruins	NHL	21	4	12	16	6	7	5	5	10	26
2023–24	Toronto Maple Leafs	NHL	80	21	22	43	53	7	1	3	4	6
2024–25	Chicago Blackhawks	NHL	82	23	23	46	51	—	—	—	—	—
2025–26	Chicago Blackhawks	NHL	79	32	26	58	42	—	—	—	—	—
NHL totals			567	168	197	365	341	14	6	8	14	32

=== International ===
Year	Team	Event	Result	GP	G	A	Pts	PIM
2019	Canada	WC	2nd place, silver medalist(s)	5	0	0	0	0
Senior totals				5	0	0	0	0

== Awards and honours ==
Award	Year
OHL
Second All-Star Team	2015
AHL
Jack A. Butterfield Trophy	2017
Calder Cup champion	2017
NHL
All-Star Game	2020
