= 2014 Memorial Cup =

Canadian junior men's ice hockey championship

2014 Mastercard Memorial Cup

Tournament details
- Venue(s): Budweiser Gardens; London, Ontario
- Dates: May 16–25, 2014
- Teams: 4
- Host team: London Knights (OHL)
- TV partner(s): Sportsnet, TVA Sports

Final positions
- Champions: Edmonton Oil Kings (WHL) (1st title)
- Runners-up: Guelph Storm (OHL)

Tournament statistics
- Games played: 8
- Attendance: 70,593 (8,824 per game)
- Scoring leader: Henrik Samuelsson (Oil Kings) (8 points)

Awards
- MVP: Edgars Kulda (Oil Kings)

The Memorial Cup trophy

The 2014 Memorial Cup was a four-team, round-robin format tournament played from May 16–25, 2014 in London, Ontario. It was the 96th Memorial Cup championship and determined the champion of the Canadian Hockey League (CHL). The tournament featured the Guelph Storm, champions of the Ontario Hockey League; the Val-d'Or Foreurs, champions of the Quebec Major Junior Hockey League; the Edmonton Oil Kings, champions of the Western Hockey League; and the London Knights, who won the right to host the tournament over bids by the Barrie Colts and the Windsor Spitfires. London last hosted the Memorial Cup in 2005.

The semi-final match on May 23 between Val-d'Or and Edmonton was, at 102 minutes and 42 seconds, the longest game in Memorial Cup history and to date is the only game to go into triple overtime.

Edmonton defeated Guelph 6–3 on May 25 to win the Memorial Cup. The victory was the first Memorial Cup for the Western Hockey League since the Spokane Chiefs won the Memorial Cup in 2008, and, as of 2025, the most recent WHL team to win the Memorial Cup. Guelph became the first team since the Sault Ste. Marie Greyhounds in 1992 to lose the final after going 3–0 in the round robin.

== Round-robin standings ==
Pos	Team	Pld	W	L	GF	GA	
1	Guelph Storm (OHL)	3	3	0	18	7	Advanced directly to the championship game
2	Val-d'Or Foreurs (QMJHL)	3	2	1	8	9	Advanced to the semifinal game
3	Edmonton Oil Kings (WHL)	3	1	2	10	11	Advanced to the semifinal game
4	London Knights (OHL/Host)	3	0	3	4	13	

== Schedule ==
All times local (UTC −5)

=== Round robin ===
May 16	Val-d'Or Foreurs	1 – 0	London Knights	Budweiser Gardens, London, Ontario	Recap
Anthony Mantha (1) - 16:20		First period	No scoring
No scoring		Second period	No scoring
No scoring		Third period	No scoring
Antoine Bibeau 51 saves / 51 shots		Goalie stats	Anthony Stolarz 27 saves / 28 shots

May 17	Guelph Storm	5 – 2	Edmonton Oil Kings	Budweiser Gardens, London, Ontario	Recap
Kerby Rychel (1) - pp - 19:55		First period	No scoring
Kerby Rychel (2) - pp - 7:40; Brock McGinn (1) - 14:52		Second period	1:19 - Henrik Samuelsson (1); 1:46 - Ashton Sautner (1)
Tyler Bertuzzi (1) - 5:46; Tyler Bertuzzi (2) - 15:49		Third period	No scoring
Justin Nichols 37 saves / 39 shots		Goalie stats	Tristan Jarry 27 saves / 32 shots

May 18	London Knights	2 – 5	Edmonton Oil Kings	Budweiser Gardens, London, Ontario	Recap
No scoring		First period	9:42 - Reid Petryk (1)
Alex Basso (1) - 16:12		Second period	6:05 - Edgars Kulda (1); 18:04 - Edgars Kulda (2)
Dakota Mermis (1) - 9:27		Third period	5:54 - Luke Bertolucci (1); 18:23 - pp - Luke Bertolucci (2)
Anthony Stolarz 27 saves / 30 shots Jake Patterson 11 saves / 13 shots		Goalie stats	Tristan Jarry 38 saves / 40 shots

May 19	Guelph Storm	6 – 3	Val-d'Or Foreurs	Budweiser Gardens, London, Ontario	Recap
Kerby Rychel (3) - 0:59; Zack Mitchell (1) - 4:00; Jason Dickinson (1) - 5:50		First period	No scoring
Pius Suter (1) - 8:13; Robby Fabbri (1) - 16:04; Tyler Bertuzzi (3) - 19:52		Second period	11:59 - pp - Randy Gazzola (1); 12:55 - Timotej Sille (1)
No scoring		Third period	12:32 - pp - Anthony Beauregard (1)
Justin Nichols 30 saves / 33 shots		Goalie stats	Antoine Bibeau 30 saves / 36 shots Keven Bouchard 13 saves / 13 shots

May 20	Edmonton Oil Kings	3 – 4	2OT	Val-d'Or Foreurs	Budweiser Gardens, London, Ontario	Recap
Reid Petryk (2) - 6:22; Curtis Lazar (1) - pp - 9:00		First period		17:04 - Shawn Ouellette-St-Amant (1)
No scoring		Second period		9:38 - sh - Pierre-Maxime Poudrier (1)
Henrik Samuelsson (2) - 5:46		Third period		15:49 - Samuel Henley (1)
No scoring		Second overtime period		1:15 - Anthony Richard (1)
Tristan Jarry 29 saves / 33 shots		Goalie stats		Antoine Bibeau 47 saves / 50 shots

May 21	London Knights	2 – 7	Guelph Storm	Budweiser Gardens, London, Ontario	Recap
Brett Welychka (1) - pp - 17:05		First period	5:56 - Scott Kosmachuk (1); 12:44 - pp - Scott Kosmachuk (2)
Josh Anderson (1) - 5:34		Second period	2:23 - pp - Tyler Bertuzzi (4); 16:05 - Tyler Bertuzzi (5)
No scoring		Third period	1:20 - pp - Jason Dickinson (2); 8:01 - Scott Kosmachuk (3); 17:14 - Marc Stevens (1)
Anthony Stolarz 14 saves / 17 shots Jake Patterson 17 saves / 21 shots		Goalie stats	Justin Nichols 45 saves / 47 shots

=== Playoff round ===
==== Semi-final ====
May 23	Edmonton Oil Kings	4 – 3	3OT	Val-d'Or Foreurs	Budweiser Gardens, London, Ontario	Recap
Mads Eller (1) - 9:00		First period		1:49 - Phil Pietroniro (1)
Mitchell Moroz (1) - pp - 6:34; Edgars Kulda (3) - 9:45		Second period		17:52 - Randy Gazzola (2)
No scoring		Third period		19:24 - Guillaume Gelinas (1)
Curtis Lazar (2) - 2:42		Third overtime period		No scoring
Tristan Jarry 46 saves / 49 shots		Goalie stats		Antoine Bibeau 51 saves / 55 shots

==== Final ====
May 25	Edmonton Oil Kings	6 – 3	Guelph Storm	Budweiser Gardens, London, Ontario	Recap
Cody Corbett (1) - pp - 9:38		First period	1:00 - Robby Fabbri (2); 16:36 - Stephen Pierog (1)
Tyler Robertson (1) - 1:58; Edgars Kulda (4) - pp - 6:06; Mitchell Moroz (2) - 14:19		Second period	No scoring
Henrik Samuelsson (3) - 5:00; Henrik Samuelsson (4) - 18:34		Third period	3:23 - Zack Mitchell (2)
Tristan Jarry 32 saves / 35 shots		Goalie stats	Justin Nichols 39 saves / 44 shots

== Statistical leaders ==
=== Skaters ===
Player	Team	GP	G	A	Pts	PIM
Henrik Samuelsson	Edmonton Oil Kings	5	4	4	8	4
Edgars Kulda	Edmonton Oil Kings	5	4	3	7	4
Kerby Rychel	Guelph Storm	4	3	4	7	0
Robby Fabbri	Guelph Storm	4	2	4	6	4
Cody Corbett	Edmonton Oil Kings	5	1	5	6	2
Tyler Bertuzzi	Guelph Storm	4	5	0	5	10
Scott Kosmachuk	Guelph Storm	4	3	2	5	4
Jason Dickinson	Guelph Storm	4	2	3	5	2
Zack Mitchell	Guelph Storm	4	2	3	5	5
Brock McGinn	Guelph Storm	4	1	4	5	2

GP = Games played; G = Goals; A = Assists; Pts = Points; PIM = Penalty minutes

=== Goaltending ===
This is a combined table of the top goaltenders based on goals against average and save percentage with at least sixty minutes played. The table is sorted by GAA.

Player	Team	GP	W	L	SA	GA	GAA	SV%	SO	TOI
Antoine Bibeau	Val-d'Or Foreurs	4	2	2	191	13	2.76	.932	1	282:25
Tristan Jarry	Edmonton Oil Kings	5	3	2	189	17	2.80	.910	0	363:57
Justin Nichols	Guelph Storm	4	3	1	163	12	3.02	.926	0	238:46
Anthony Stolarz	London Knights	3	0	3	75	7	3.49	.907	0	120:27

GP = Games played; W = Wins; L = Losses; SA = Shots against; GA = Goals against; GAA = Goals against average; SV% = Save percentage; SO = Shutouts; TOI = Time on ice (minutes:seconds)

== Awards ==
- Stafford Smythe Memorial Trophy (MVP): Edgars Kulda, Edmonton Oil Kings
- Ed Chynoweth Trophy (Leading Scorer): Henrik Samuelsson, Edmonton Oil Kings
- George Parsons Trophy (Sportsmanlike): Curtis Lazar, Edmonton Oil Kings
- Hap Emms Memorial Trophy (Top Goalie): Antoine Bibeau, Val-d'Or Foreurs
- All-Star Team:

Goaltender: Antoine Bibeau, Val-d'Or Foreurs
Defence: Cody Corbett (Edmonton Oil Kings), Matt Finn (Guelph Storm)
Forwards: Edgars Kulda (Edmonton Oil Kings), Kerby Rychel (Guelph Storm), Henrik Samuelsson (Edmonton Oil Kings)

== Rosters ==
=== London Knights (Host) ===
- Head coach: Dale Hunter

Pos.	No.	Player
GK	35	Jake Patterson
GK	43	Anthony Stolarz
D	7	Zach Bell
D	44	Dakota Mermis
D	52	Alex Basso
D	55	Tim Bender
D	57	Brady Austin
D	65	Nikita Zadorov
D	74	Aiden Jamieson
F	10	Christian Dvorak
F	11	Owen MacDonald
F	14	Gemel Smith
F	16	Max Domi
F	18	Tristen Elie
F	21	Chandler Yakimowicz
F	24	Michael McCarron
F	26	Tait Seguin
F	27	Brett Welychka
F	46	Matt Rupert
F	53	Bo Horvat
F	64	Ryan Rupert
F	71	Chris Tierney
F	77	Josh Anderson
F	93	Mitch Marner

=== Guelph Storm (OHL) ===
- Head coach: Scott Walker

Pos.	No.	Player
GK	31	Matthew Mancina
GK	39	Justin Nichols
D	3	Steven Trojanovic
D	4	Matt Finn
D	6	Phil Baltisberger
D	7	Ben Harpur
D	8	Zac Leslie
D	10	Nick Ebert
D	26	Chadd Bauman
D	27	Garrett McFadden
F	9	Robby Fabbri
F	11	Jason Dickinson
F	12	Ryan Horvat
F	13	Adam Craievich
F	15	Marc Stevens
F	16	Kerby Rychel
F	17	Tyler Bertuzzi
F	19	Stephen Pierog
F	20	Justin Auger
F	21	Brock McGinn
F	22	Pius Suter
F	23	Zack Mitchell
F	24	Scott Kosmachuk

=== Edmonton Oil Kings (WHL) ===
- Head coach: Derek Laxdal

Pos.	No.	Player
GK	30	Tristan Jarry
GK	35	Tyler Santos
D	2	Cody Corbett
D	4	Blake Orban
D	5	Ashton Sautner
D	8	Griffin Reinhart
D	22	Ben Carroll
D	24	Aaron Irving
D	28	Jesse Mills
D	37	Dysin Mayo
F	10	Henrik Samuelsson
F	11	Luke Bertolucci
F	12	Cole Benson
F	13	Brandon Baddock
F	14	Riley Kieser
F	17	Brandon Ralph
F	18	Reid Petryk
F	20	Mads Eller
F	21	Tyler Robertson
F	23	Edgars Kulda
F	25	Lane Bauer
F	27	Curtis Lazar
F	29	Mitchell Moroz
F	36	Mitchell Walter
F	39	Brett Pollock

=== Val-d'Or Foreurs (QMJHL) ===
- Head coach: Mario Durocher

Pos.	No.	Player
GK	30	Antoine Bibeau
GK	33	Keven Bouchard
D	2	Randy Gazzola
D	4	Maxime Gravel
D	5	Guillaume Gelinas
D	18	Keven Larouche
D	20	Ryan Graves
D	24	Jeremie Fraser
D	26	Oliver Galipeau
F	7	Phil Pietroniro
F	8	Anthony Mantha
F	9	Anthony Richard
F	11	Louick Marcotte
F	12	Julien Gauthier
F	14	Samuel Henley
F	16	Nicolas Aube-Kubel
F	19	Maxime Presseault
F	21	Anthony Beauregard
F	27	Timotej Sille
F	28	Shawn Ouellette-St-Amant
F	47	Owen Bennington
F	72	Pierre-Maxime Poudrier

== Road to the Cup ==
=== WHL Playoffs ===
Conference Quarterfinals	Conference Semifinals
1	Edmonton	4
8	Prince Albert	0
1	Edmonton	4
7	Brandon	1
2	Regina	0
7	Brandon	4
Eastern
3	Calgary	2
6	Kootenay	4
4	Medicine Hat	4
6	Kootenay	3
4	Medicine Hat	4
5	Swift Current	2
Note: Pairings are re-seeded after the first round.
1	Kelowna	4
8	Tri-City	1
1	Kelowna	4
4	Seattle	0
2	Portland	4
7	Vancouver	0
Western
3	Victoria	4
6	Spokane	0
2	Portland	4
3	Victoria	1
4	Seattle	4
5	Everett	1

Conference Finals
1	Edmonton	4
4	Medicine Hat	1
1	Kelowna	1
2	Portland	4

WHL Championship
E1	Edmonton	4
W2	Portland	3

=== OHL Playoffs ===
Conference Quarter-finals	Conference Semi-finals
1	Oshawa	4
8	Mississauga	0
1	Oshawa	4
6	Peterborough	0
2	North Bay	4
7	Niagara	3
Eastern Conference
3	Kingston	3
6	Peterborough	4
2	North Bay	4
4	Barrie	2
4	Barrie	4
5	Sudbury	1
Note: Pairings are re-seeded after the first round.
1	Guelph	4
8	Plymouth	1
1	Guelph	4
4	London	1
2	Sault Ste. Marie	4
7	Owen Sound	1
Western Conference
3	Erie	4
6	Saginaw	1
2	Sault Ste. Marie	0
3	Erie	4
4	London	4
5	Windsor	0

Conference Finals
1	Oshawa	0
2	North Bay	4
1	Guelph	4
3	Erie	1

OHL Championship
E2	North Bay	1
W1	Guelph	4

=== QMJHL Playoffs ===
Round 1
1	Baie-Comeau	4
16	Shawinigan	0
2	Halifax	4
15	Charlottetown	0
3	Val-d'Or	4
14	Acadie–Bathurst	0
4	Rimouski	4
13	Chicoutimi	0
Note: Pairings are re-seeded after the first and second rounds.
5	Blainville-Boisbriand	4
12	Moncton	2
6	Drummondville	4
11	Victoriaville	1
7	Quebec	1
10	Rouyn-Noranda	4
8	Gatineau	4
9	Cape Breton	0

Quarter-finals
1	Baie-Comeau	4
10	Rouyn-Noranda	0
2	Halifax	4
8	Gatineau	1
3	Val-d'Or	4
6	Drummondville	2
4	Rimouski	3
5	Blainville-Boisbriand	4

Semi-finals
1	Baie-Comeau	4
5	Blainville-Boisbriand	3
2	Halifax	3
3	Val-d'Or	4

President's Cup Championship
1	Baie-Comeau	3
3	Val-d'Or	4
