= Antoine Bibeau =

Canadian ice hockey player

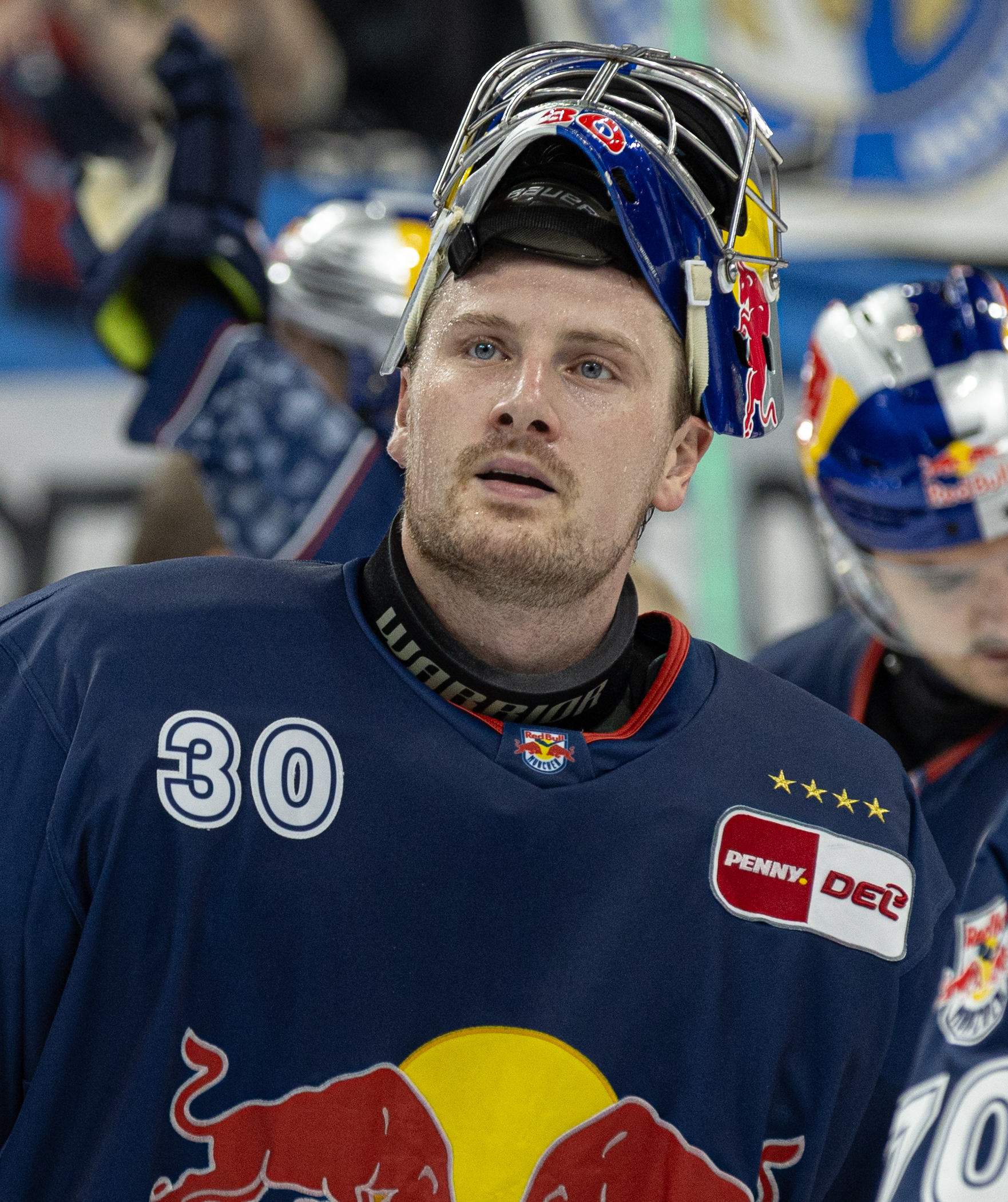
- Bibeau with EHC Red Bull München in 2025
- Born: May 1, 1994 (age 32) Victoriaville, Quebec, Canada
- Height: 6 ft 2 in (188 cm)
- Weight: 210 lb (95 kg; 15 st 0 lb)
- Position: Goaltender
- Catches: Left
- DEL team Former teams: EHC München; Toronto Maple Leafs; Colorado Avalanche; AIK; KooKoo
- NHL draft: 172nd overall, 2013; Toronto Maple Leafs
- Playing career: 2014–present

Antoine Bibeau (born May 1, 1994) is a Canadian professional ice hockey goaltender for EHC Red Bull München of the Deutsche Eishockey Liga (DEL). Bibeau was selected by the Toronto Maple Leafs in the sixth round, 172nd overall, of the 2013 NHL entry draft.

== Playing career ==
=== Junior ===
As a youth, Bibeau played in the 2006 and 2007 Quebec International Pee-Wee Hockey Tournaments with the Victoriaville Tigres minor ice hockey team. Bibeau played in the Quebec Major Junior Hockey League (QMJHL) from 2011 to 2014. He played with the Charlottetown Islanders until his final year of major junior hockey when he was traded to the Val-d'Or Foreurs. He went on to capture the 2014 President's Cup with the Foreurs and was recognized for his outstanding play when he was awarded the Guy Lafleur Trophy as the QMJHL Playoffs Most Valuable Player. The Foreurs then went on to play in the Memorial Cup where Bibeau was named the tournament's outstanding goaltender.

=== Professional ===
Bibeau was selected in the 6th round, 172nd overall in the 2013 NHL entry draft by the Toronto Maple Leafs. He was invited to his first training camp in 2013, but was sent back to his junior team in the first round of cuts. On July 3, 2014, the Maple Leafs signed Bibeau to an entry-level contract. He attended training camp in 2014 and had a successful rookie tournament, but was demoted to the teams' American Hockey League (AHL) affiliate, the Toronto Marlies, on September 29. Bibeau was called up on an emergency basis in February 2015 to replace a Jonathan Bernier who was out with an illness but did not play. Bibeau was recalled on December 1, 2015, when James Reimer was announced as injured. He was reassigned to the Marlies on December 10. The following season he attended the 2016 Maple Leafs training camp and was returned to the Marlies. He was recalled in December 2016 to replace the struggling Jhonas Enroth and made his NHL debut on December 11, in a match up against the Colorado Avalanche. Despite a solid performance by both Bibeau and the team, where they recorded 52 shots to Colorado's 29, the Maple Leafs would lose 3–1. He was demoted again until being recalled on December 27. Bibeau's first NHL win came in his second game, where he would make 25 saves in a 3–2 overtime win against the Tampa Bay Lightning on December 29. He was returned to the Marlies in January 2017. At the completion of his entry-level contract with the Maple Leafs, Bibeau was not tendered a qualifying offer as a restricted free agent on June 26, 2017. Bibeau finished his career with the Leafs with a 1–1–0 record and .927 save percentage. He played in 104 games with the Marlies, finishing with a 56–33–11 record and a save percentage of .906.

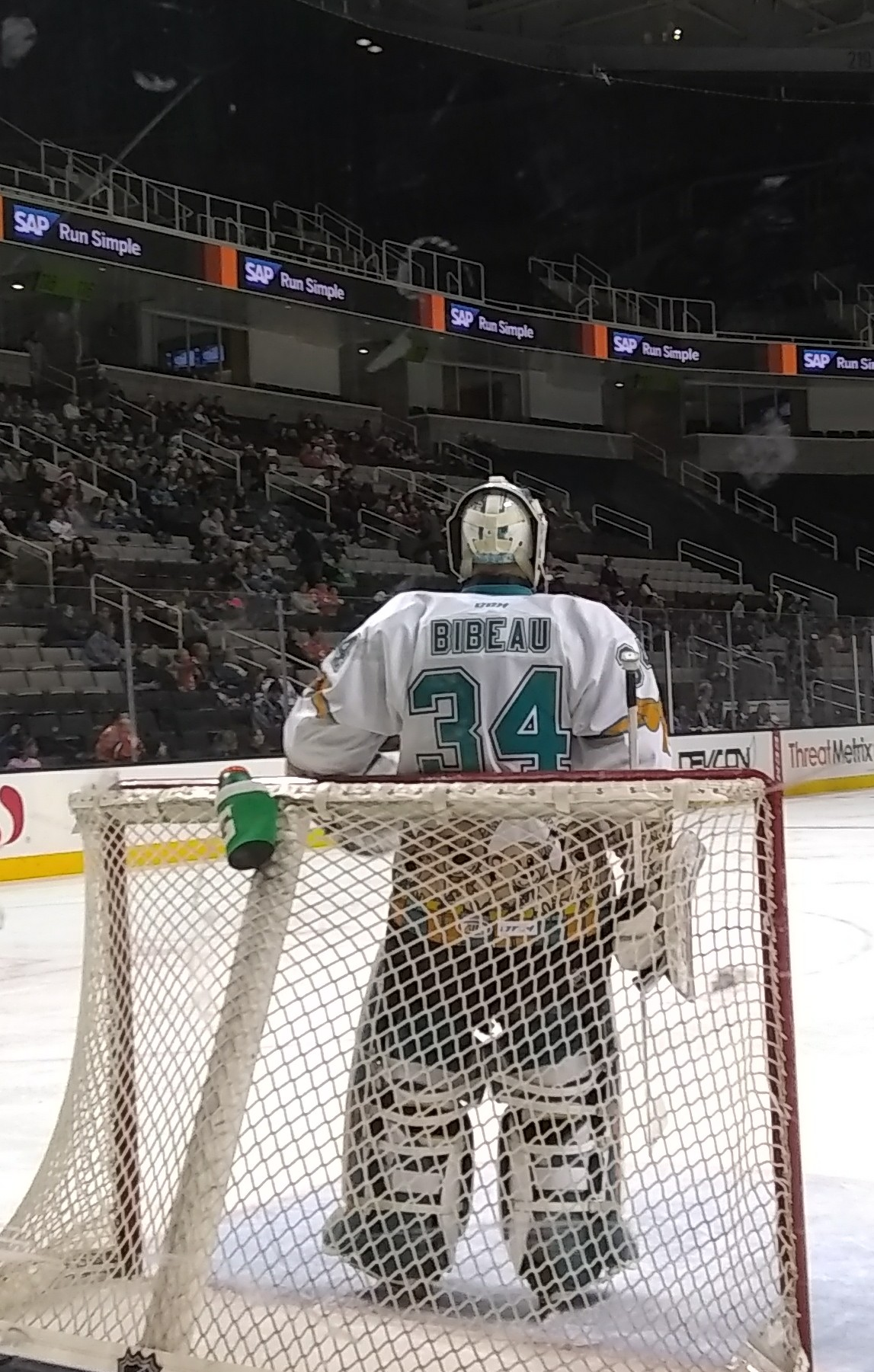
Bibeau on Teddy Bear Toss night for the San Jose Barracuda of the AHL.

On July 1, 2017, Bibeau as a free agent signed a one-year, two-way contract with the San Jose Sharks. After reporting to his first training camp with the Sharks, Bibeau was assigned to AHL affiliate, the San Jose Barracuda, and posted a 23–14–4 record in his first season with the Barracuda in 2017–18. He had a .919 save percentage and a 2.37 goals-against average, earning a spot on the Pacific Division's All-Star Team. On March 13, 2018, Bibeau signed a two-year contract extension with the Sharks. On October 2, 2018, he was assigned by the Sharks to continue with the San Jose Barracuda. He spent the 2018–19 season in the AHL, where he went 16–13–5 with a .904 save percentage and a 2.89 goals-against average.

Prior to the 2019–20 season, Bibeau was traded by the Sharks to the Colorado Avalanche in exchange for Nicolas Meloche on September 27, 2019. He was directly assigned to report to the Colorado Eagles' training camp. In his Eagles debut on October 4, 2019, Bibeau allowed five goals in an opening night defeat to the Stockton Heat, while also suffering a hip injury which placed him on the injured reserve. After a month of rehabilitation, Bibeau was recalled by the Avalanche due to multiple injuries in goal and made his debut with the Avalanche in replacing Adam Werner during a 6–2 defeat to the Edmonton Oilers on November 14, 2019. On November 16, 2019, he became the fourth goaltender to start a game with the Avalanche and also record a win in backstopping Colorado to a 5–4 overtime decision over the Vancouver Canucks. In returning to the AHL, during his first game back with the Eagles on November 23, Bibeau suffered a re-occurrence of his hip injury and opted to undergo season-ending hip surgery effectively ending his brief but eventful stint within the Avalanche organization.

As a free agent on October 22, 2020, Bibeau signed a one-year, two-way contract with the Carolina Hurricanes. Bibeau never featured with the Hurricanes in the shortened 2020–21 season, posting 5 wins through 8 games in his assignment to the Chicago Wolves of the AHL.

On August 20, 2021, Bibeau signed as a free agent to a one-year, two-way contract with expansion club, the Seattle Kraken. In the following 2021–22 season, Bibeau endured a disjointed season, joining shared AHL affiliate, the Charlotte Checkers, and splitting the season with the Allen Americans of the ECHL.

At the conclusion of his contract with the Kraken, Bibeau left as a free agent and was signed to a one-year, two-way contract with the Ottawa Senators on July 14, 2022. Bibeau was assigned to Ottawa's AHL affiliate, the Belleville Senators and was paired with Mads Søgaard as the goaltending duo for the team to start the season. On November 26, 2022, Bibeau set a career high in saves in a single game, making 49 of them in a 4–1 win over the Laval Rocket, which also became the Belleville Senators' franchise record. Bibeau went down with a broken finger followed by another injury roughly when Ottawa was going through an injury crisis among their goaltenders too in January 2023. Following his return from injury, management sought to use younger goalies in net and Bibeau's ice time declined. He then broke another finger and missed more time. At the end of the season, he was told he would not return with Belleville.

As a free agent, Bibeau opted to pursue a contract in Europe for the first time in his career and later agreed to an optional two-year contract with Swedish second tier club, AIK IF of the Allsvenskan on July 23, 2023. In the 2023–24 season, Bibeau backstopped AIK to the playoffs, posting 16 wins through 29 appearances.

After AIK's elimination through the qualification playoffs, Bibeau left Sweden and AIK to sign a one-year contract with Finnish top flight club, KooKoo of the Liiga, on June 12, 2024. Bibeau enjoyed a lone season with KooKoo before extending his European career by signing a one-year deal with German outfit, EHC München of the DEL, on October 8, 2025.

== Career statistics ==
			Regular season									Playoffs
Season	Team	League	GP	W	L	OTL	MIN	GA	SO	GAA	SV%	GP	W	L	MIN	GA	SO	GAA	SV%
2010–11	Lewiston Maineiacs	QMJHL	3	2	0	0	144	5	0	2.10	.914	—	—	—	—	—	—	—	—
2011–12	PEI Rocket	QMJHL	29	7	9	1	1183	88	0	4.46	.868	—	—	—	—	—	—	—	—
2012–13	PEI Rocket	QMJHL	46	28	11	3	2521	118	5	2.81	.911	6	2	4	374	21	0	3.37	.907
2013–14	Charlottetown Islanders	QMJHL	26	8	11	5	1424	78	1	3.29	.911	—	—	—	—	—	—	—	—
2013–14	Val d'Or Foreurs	QMJHL	22	13	7	1	1267	64	1	3.03	.900	24	16	8	1476	69	1	2.80	.913
2014–15	Toronto Marlies	AHL	31	15	10	5	1809	81	4	2.69	.913	1	0	1	57	3	0	3.13	.929
2015–16	Toronto Marlies	AHL	40	28	9	1	2354	106	3	2.70	.909	12	6	5	682	31	1	2.73	.900
2016–17	Toronto Marlies	AHL	32	13	14	5	1892	97	3	3.08	.894	1	0	1	37	2	0	3.23	.882
2016–17	Toronto Maple Leafs	NHL	2	1	1	0	121	4	0	1.98	.927	—	—	—	—	—	—	—	—
2017–18	San Jose Barracuda	AHL	43	23	14	4	2406	95	5	2.37	.919	4	1	3	212	13	0	3.68	.865
2018–19	San Jose Barracuda	AHL	35	16	13	5	2055	99	1	2.89	.904	1	0	0	10	3	0	17.48	.625
2019–20	Colorado Eagles	AHL	2	0	2	0	80	8	0	6.02	.765	—	—	—	—	—	—	—	—
2019–20	Colorado Avalanche	NHL	2	1	0	0	92	5	0	3.27	.881	—	—	—	—	—	—	—	—
2020–21	Chicago Wolves	AHL	8	5	2	1	483	20	0	2.49	.912	—	—	—	—	—	—	—	—
2021–22	Charlotte Checkers	AHL	10	4	1	2	484	20	0	2.48	.905	—	—	—	—	—	—	—	—
2021–22	Allen Americans	ECHL	14	7	4	2	816	38	0	2.79	.923	—	—	—	—	—	—	—	—
2022–23	Belleville Senators	AHL	23	9	10	2	1179	69	0	3.51	.894	—	—	—	—	—	—	—	—
2023–24	AIK	Allsv	29	16	11	0	1604	66	6	2.47	.921	5	2	3	337	13	0	2.31	.938
2024–25	KooKoo	Liiga	35	20	13	0	2050	89	0	2.60	.905	1	0	1	58	3	0	3.10	.842
2025–26	EHC München	DEL	29	23	6	0	1715	55	4	1.92	.923	9	3	6	528	27	0	3.07	.884
NHL totals			4	2	1	0	213	9	0	2.54	.907	—	—	—	—	—	—	—	—

== Awards and honors ==
Award	Year
QMJHL
Guy Lafleur Trophy – Playoffs MVP	2013–14
Hap Emms Memorial Trophy – Memorial Cup Most Outstanding Goaltender	2014
CHL Memorial Cup All-Star Team	2014
AHL
All-Star Game	2018
