= Henrik Samuelsson =

American ice hockey player

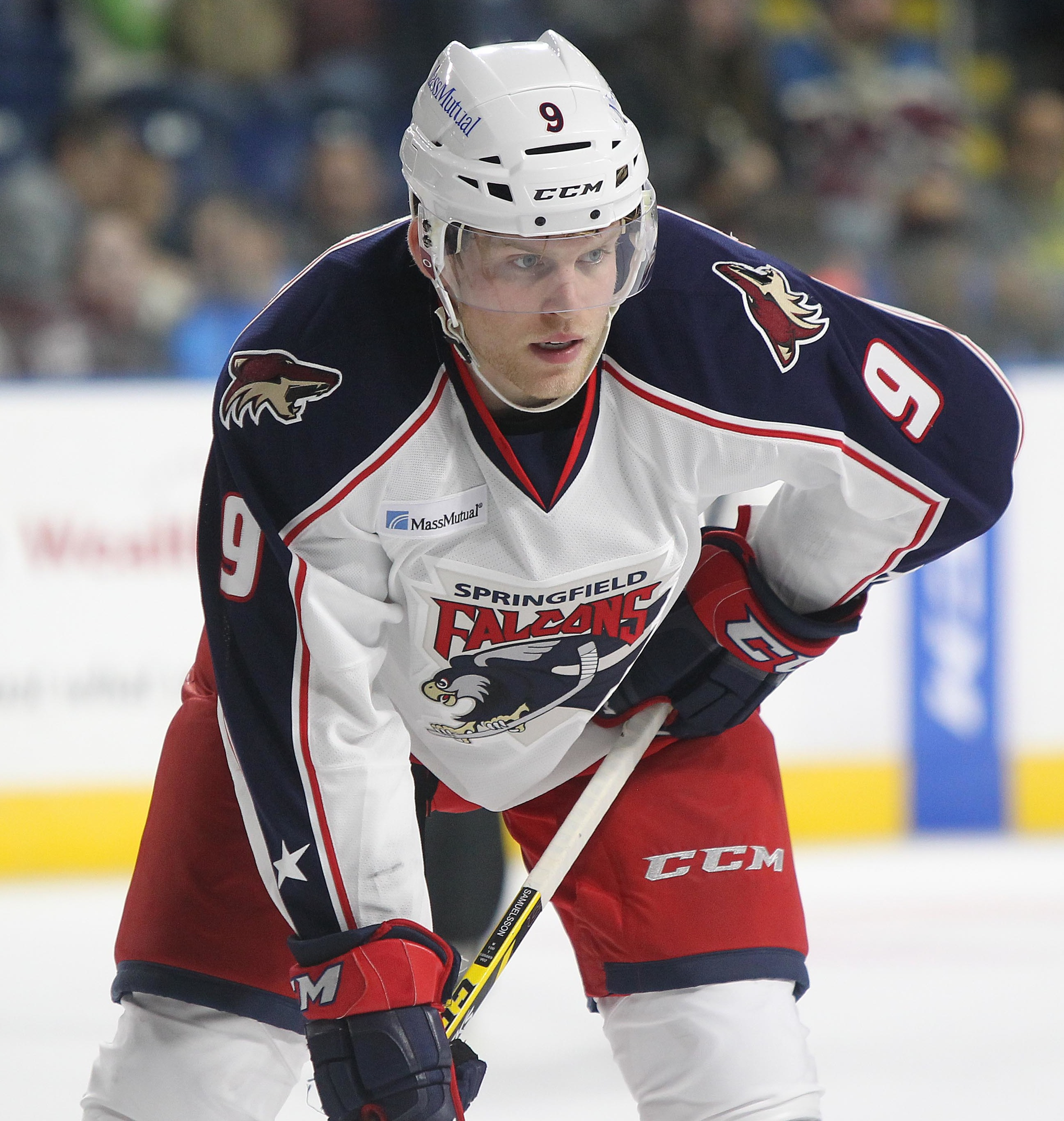
- Samuelsson with the Springfield Falcons in 2015
- Born: February 7, 1994 (age 32) Pittsburgh, Pennsylvania, U.S.
- Height: 6 ft 2 in (188 cm)
- Weight: 192 lb (87 kg; 13 st 10 lb)
- Position: Right wing
- Shot: Right
- Played for: Modo Hockey; Arizona Coyotes; Manchester Storm; HK Levice
- NHL draft: 27th overall, 2012; Phoenix Coyotes
- Playing career: 2014–2020

Henrik Samuelsson (born February 7, 1994) is a Swedish-American former professional ice hockey player. Samuelsson most notably played with Modo Hockey in the Swedish Hockey League and the Arizona Coyotes in the National Hockey League (NHL).

== Playing career ==
As a youth, Samuelsson played in the 2007 Quebec International Pee-Wee Hockey Tournament with a minor ice hockey team from Phoenix, Arizona.

Samuelsson was drafted twenty-seventh overall by the Phoenix Coyotes in the 2012 NHL entry draft whilst playing major junior hockey for the Edmonton Oil Kings of the Western Hockey League. On March 11, 2013, he was signed to a three-year entry-level contract with the Coyotes.

On February 26, 2015, Henrik made his NHL debut in a game against the New York Rangers. His father, Ulf, was in attendance as an assistant coach for the Rangers.

During the 2016–17 season, having contributed with just 2 goals in 20 games with AHL affiliate the Tucson Roadrunners, Samuelsson was traded by the Coyotes to the Edmonton Oilers, in exchange for a former junior teammate, Mitch Moroz, on February 1, 2017. With the Oilers AHL affiliate, the Bakersfield Condors, Samuelsson appeared in 5 scoreless games.

As a free agent, Samuelsson opted to continue his career in the ECHL, agreeing to a one-year deal with the Idaho Steelheads on September 7, 2017.

As of January 2020, Samuelsson was playing for the Manchester Storm in the EIHL.

Samuelsson originally agreed to a move to Saryarka Karagandy of the VHL for the 2020–21 season. However, Samuelsson instead moved to Slovak 1. Liga side HK Levice and closed out his professional career after just 1 appearance with the club.

== Personal life ==
Henrik is the son of two-time Penguins Stanley Cup winner Ulf Samuelsson and his older brother Philip currently plays for IK Oskarshamn in the SHL. Samuelsson was born in Pittsburgh while his father was a member of the Penguins. As a result of his father's career, Samuelsson lived in four different cities before settling in Scottsdale, Arizona, following his father's playing career.

== Career statistics ==
=== Regular season and playoffs ===
			Regular season					Playoffs
Season	Team	League	GP	G	A	Pts	PIM	GP	G	A	Pts	PIM
2010–11	U.S. NTDP Juniors	USHL	27	4	7	11	78	—	—	—	—	—
2010–11	U.S. NTDP U17	USDP	38	12	16	28	98	—	—	—	—	—
2010–11	U.S. NTDP U18	USDP	16	3	4	7	14	—	—	—	—	—
2011–12	Modo Hockey	J18	3	4	1	5	8	—	—	—	—	—
2011–12	Modo Hockey	J20	16	4	5	9	22	—	—	—	—	—
2011–12	Modo Hockey	SEL	15	0	2	2	12	—	—	—	—	—
2011–12	Edmonton Oil Kings	WHL	28	7	16	23	42	17	4	10	14	20
2012–13	Edmonton Oil Kings	WHL	69	33	47	80	97	22	11	8	19	43
2013–14	Edmonton Oil Kings	WHL	65	35	60	95	97	21	8	15	23	51
2014–15	Portland Pirates	AHL	68	18	22	40	56	5	2	3	5	13
2014–15	Arizona Coyotes	NHL	3	0	0	0	2	—	—	—	—	—
2015–16	Springfield Falcons	AHL	43	3	9	12	30	—	—	—	—	—
2016–17	Tucson Roadrunners	AHL	20	2	1	3	16	—	—	—	—	—
2016–17	Bakersfield Condors	AHL	5	0	0	0	4	—	—	—	—	—
2017–18	Idaho Steelheads	ECHL	49	16	27	43	96	—	—	—	—	—
2017–18	Rockford IceHogs	AHL	25	9	3	12	33	4	0	0	0	2
2018–19	Rockford IceHogs	AHL	40	2	5	7	33	—	—	—	—	—
2018–19	Idaho Steelheads	ECHL	23	5	5	10	24	11	5	3	8	16
2019–20	Manchester Storm	EIHL	31	5	7	12	24	—	—	—	—	—
2020–21	HK Levice	SVK.2	1	0	0	0	0	—	—	—	—	—
AHL totals			201	34	40	74	172	9	2	3	5	15
NHL totals			3	0	0	0	2	—	—	—	—	—

=== International ===
Year	Team	Event	Result	GP	G	A	Pts	PIM
2011	United States	U17	2nd place, silver medalist(s)	5	6	4	10	6
2011	United States	U18	1st place, gold medalist(s)	6	0	1	1	4
Junior totals				11	6	5	11	10

== Awards and honors ==
Honors	Year
CHL Memorial Cup All-Star Team	2012, 2014
Memorial Cup Champion	2014

Awards and achievements
Preceded by Connor Murphy	Arizona Coyotes first-round draft pick 2012	Succeeded by Max Domi
