= Artūrs Kulda =

Latvian ice hockey player (born 1988)

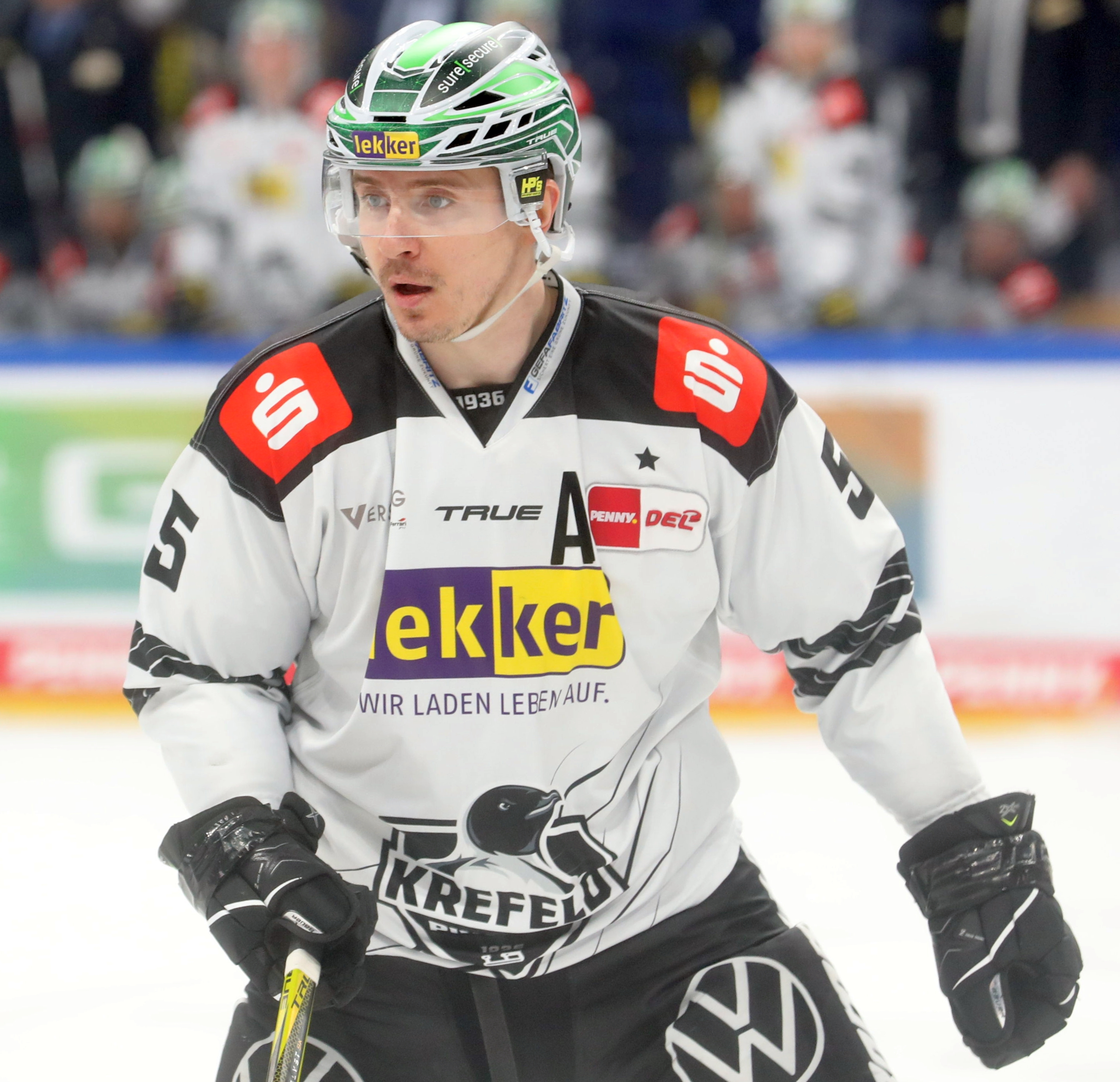
- Kulda in 2022
- Born: 25 July 1988 (age 38) Leipzig, East Germany
- Height: 6 ft 2 in (188 cm)
- Weight: 215 lb (98 kg; 15 st 5 lb)
- Position: Defence
- Shoots: Left
- ICEHL team Former teams: EC VSV; Atlanta Thrashers; Winnipeg Jets; Sibir Novosibirsk; Salavat Yulaev Ufa; Jokerit; Kunlun Red Star; HC Sparta Praha; Severstal Cherepovets; Dinamo Riga; Nürnberg Ice Tigers; Krefeld Pinguine
- National team: Latvia
- NHL draft: 200th overall, 2006; Atlanta Thrashers
- Playing career: 2005–present

Artūrs Kulda (born 25 July 1988) is a Latvian professional ice hockey player who is a defenceman for EC VSV of the ICE Hockey League (ICEHL). He is the older brother of Edgars Kulda.

== Playing career ==
Kulda was a seventh-round 200th selection of the Atlanta Thrashers in 2006. He made his National Hockey League (NHL) debut with the Thrashers on 12 February 2010 against the Minnesota Wild. He was a member of the Chicago Wolves' Calder Cup championship team in 2008.

While playing for Latvia at the 2011 World Championships, in Bratislava, Slovakia, Kulda checked Radek Martínek of the Czech Republic into the boards, knocking him unconscious and requiring him to be hospitalized. Kulda was suspended three games for the hit because he made contact with Martínek's head and left his feet to deliver the hit.

On 15 July 2012, Kulda signed a one-year contract with Sibir Novosibirsk of the Kontinental Hockey League. At the end of 2012–13 season with Novosibirsk, Kulda signed a pro-rated one-year contract to return with the Winnipeg Jets of the NHL. Kulda did not dress for any game before returning abroad.

On 15 July 2013, Kulda signed a two-year contract with his second KHL club, Salavat Yulaev Ufa.

== Career statistics ==
=== Regular season and playoffs ===
			Regular season					Playoffs
Season	Team	League	GP	G	A	Pts	PIM	GP	G	A	Pts	PIM
2003–04	Prizma/Rīga 86	LAT	11	0	0	0	8	2	0	0	0	0
2004–05	SDYUSHOR CSKA Moscow	MosJHL	25	1	11	12	14	—	—	—	—	—
2005–06	CSKA–2 Moscow	RUS.3	40	3	9	12	24	—	—	—	—	—
2005–06	SDYUSHOR CSKA Moscow	MosJHL	2	0	2	2	2	—	—	—	—	—
2006–07	Peterborough Petes	OHL	58	2	9	11	83	—	—	—	—	—
2007–08	Peterborough Petes	OHL	55	7	27	34	87	5	1	3	4	6
2007–08	Chicago Wolves	AHL	5	0	1	1	10	21	1	4	5	32
2008–09	Chicago Wolves	AHL	57	1	14	15	59	—	—	—	—	—
2009–10	Chicago Wolves	AHL	66	6	19	25	46	14	1	4	5	8
2009–10	Atlanta Thrashers	NHL	4	0	2	2	2	—	—	—	—	—
2010–11	Chicago Wolves	AHL	69	5	12	17	73	—	—	—	—	—
2010–11	Atlanta Thrashers	NHL	2	0	0	0	2	—	—	—	—	—
2011–12	St. John's IceCaps	AHL	63	6	14	20	62	13	0	1	1	8
2011–12	Winnipeg Jets	NHL	9	0	0	0	4	—	—	—	—	—
2012–13	Sibir Novosibirsk	KHL	50	9	6	15	55	7	0	1	1	0
2013–14	Salavat Yulaev Ufa	KHL	43	1	9	10	42	18	1	4	5	18
2014–15	Salavat Yulaev Ufa	KHL	45	4	5	9	28	5	0	0	0	2
2015–16	Jokerit	KHL	42	1	5	6	36	6	0	0	0	4
2016–17	Jokerit	KHL	44	0	11	11	28	3	0	1	1	4
2017–18	Kunlun Red Star	KHL	47	2	4	6	33	—	—	—	—	—
2017–18	HC Sparta Praha	ELH	3	0	0	0	0	3	0	0	0	2
2018–19	Severstal Cherepovets	KHL	59	2	5	7	42	—	—	—	—	—
2019–20	Dinamo Rīga	KHL	6	0	2	2	0	—	—	—	—	—
2019–20	Severstal Cherepovets	KHL	20	1	4	5	8	—	—	—	—	—
2020–21	Nürnberg Ice Tigers	DEL	33	1	17	18	40	—	—	—	—	—
2021–22	Krefeld Pinguine	DEL	55	4	9	13	30	—	—	—	—	—
2022–23	EC VSV	ICEHL	46	5	20	25	51	5	0	0	0	2
NHL totals			15	0	2	2	8	—	—	—	—	—
KHL totals			356	20	51	71	272	39	1	6	7	28

=== International ===
Year	Team	Event	GP	G	A	Pts	PIM
2004	Latvia	WJC18 D1	5	0	1	1	6
2005	Latvia	WJC18 D1	5	0	2	2	18
2006	Latvia	WJC	6	0	1	1	6
2006	Latvia	WJC18 D1	5	1	2	3	12
2007	Latvia	WJC D1	5	0	2	2	27
2008	Latvia	WJC D1	5	1	4	5	12
2010	Latvia	WC	3	0	0	0	2
2011	Latvia	WC	3	0	0	0	6
2013	Latvia	OGQ	3	0	0	0	0
2013	Latvia	WC	7	1	1	2	8
2014	Latvia	OG	5	0	1	1	2
2014	Latvia	WC	6	4	1	5	4
2016	Latvia	OGQ	3	0	0	0	0
2017	Latvia	WC	7	0	1	1	6
2019	Latvia	WC	7	0	1	1	2
2021	Latvia	WC	4	0	0	0	2
2022	Latvia	OG	3	0	0	0	0
2022	Latvia	WC	5	1	0	1	4
Junior totals			31	2	12	14	81
Senior totals			56	6	5	11	36
