= Timotej Šille =

Slovak ice hockey player

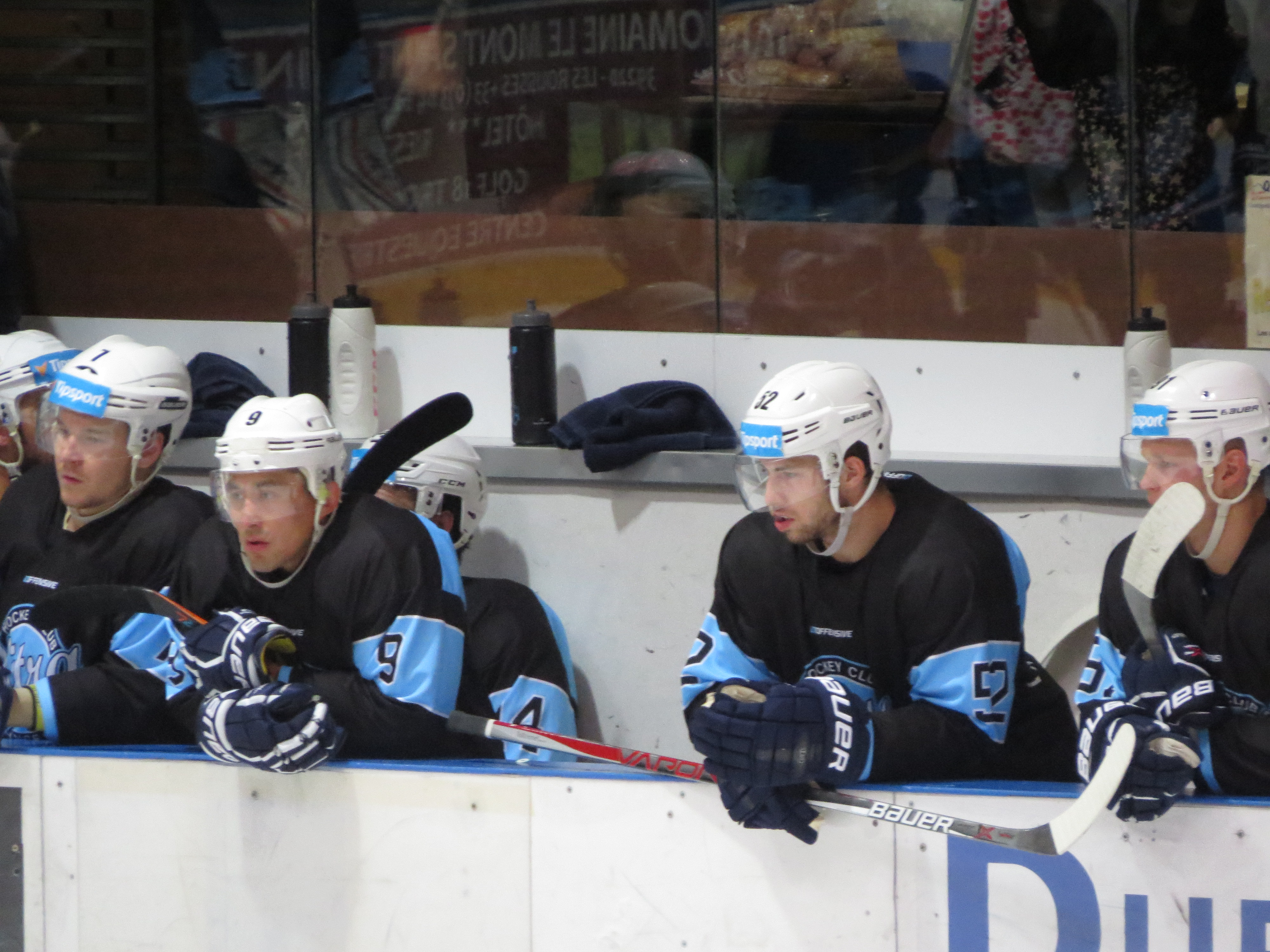
- Born: 22 June 1995 (age 30) Bratislava, Slovakia
- Height: 6 ft 3 in (191 cm)
- Weight: 209 lb (95 kg; 14 st 13 lb)
- Position: Centre / Left wing
- Shoots: Left
- Slovak team Former teams: HC Slovan Bratislava; HK 36 Skalica; Fehérvár AV19; HK Nitra; HC Nové Zámky; HC 05 Banská Bystrica; EHC Freiburg; JoKP
- NHL draft: Undrafted
- Playing career: 2012–present

Timotej Šille (born 22 June 1995) is Slovak professional ice hockey player who is currently playing for HC Slovan Bratislava of the Slovak Extraliga.

Šille originally made his professional debut in the Slovak Extraliga debut playing with HK 36 Skalica during the 2012–13 Slovak Extraliga season. He was also member of Slovakia U18 national team at 2013 World Junior U18 Championships in Sochi, Russia.

In the 2013–14 season he won the President's cup in the QMJHL league and participated in 2014 Memorial Cup.

He is currently living in Drummondville, QC.

== Career statistics ==
=== Regular season and playoffs ===
			Regular season					Playoffs
Season	Team	League	GP	G	A	Pts	PIM	GP	G	A	Pts	PIM
