= Edgars Kulda =

Latvian ice hockey player

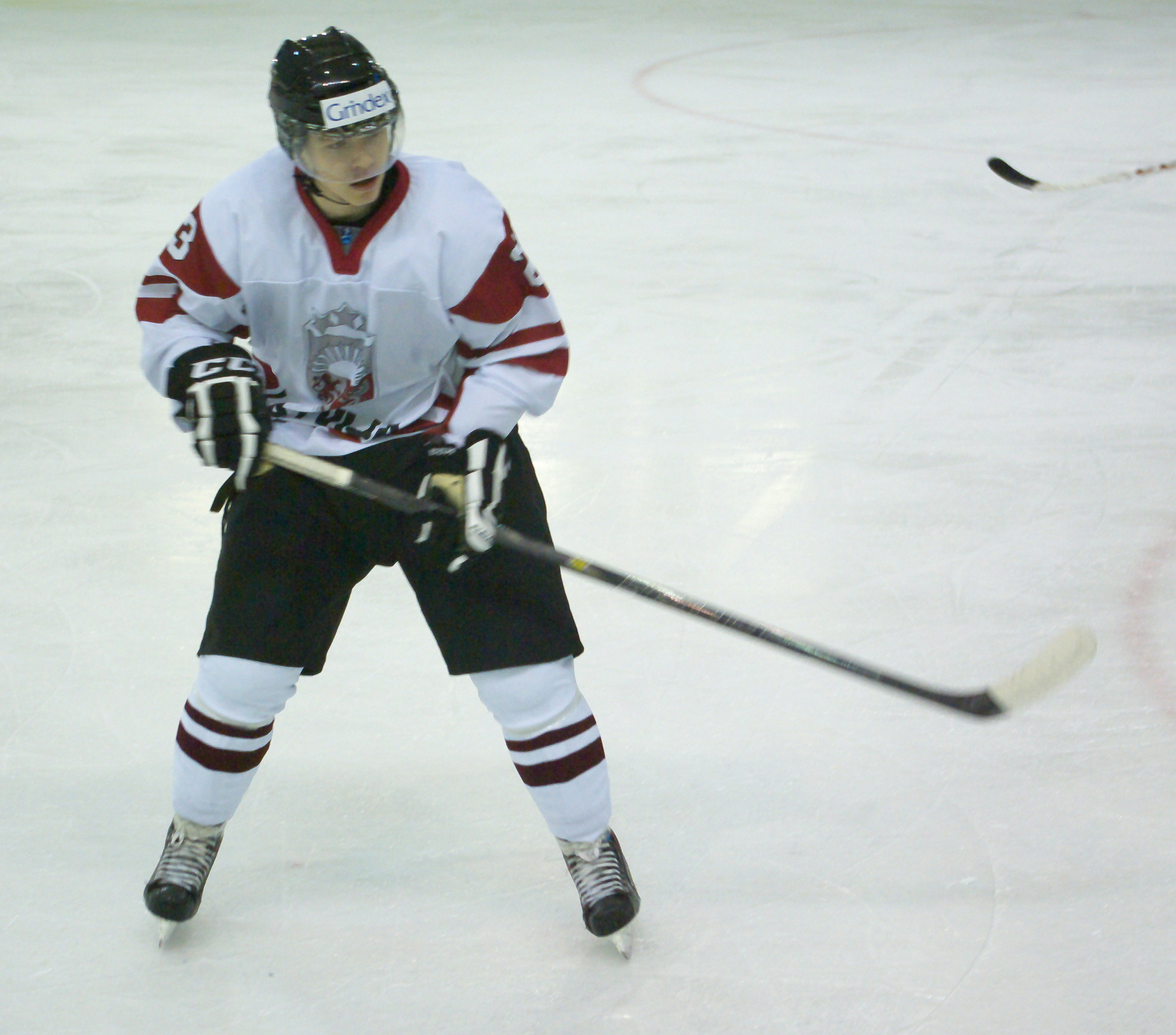
- Kulda with Latvia in 2013
- Born: 13 November 1994 (age 31) Riga, Latvia
- Height: 6 ft 0 in (183 cm)
- Weight: 192 lb (87 kg; 13 st 10 lb)
- Position: Left wing
- Shoots: Left
- KHL team Former teams: Dinamo Riga; PSG Berani Zlín
- National team: Latvia
- NHL draft: 193rd overall, 2014; Arizona Coyotes
- Playing career: 2011–present

Edgars Kulda (born 13 November 1994) is a Latvian professional ice hockey winger currently playing for Dinamo Riga in the Kontinental Hockey League (KHL). He was selected 193rd overall in the 2014 NHL entry draft by the Arizona Coyotes. He played in Latvian minor and youth leagues.

== Playing career ==
=== Junior ===
Kulda began playing hockey in BHS hockey school and founded by former Dinamo Rīga player Helmuts Balderis.

In 2011–12 season Kulda moved to North America to play for Edmonton Oil Kings of WHL. His most successful season as Oil King was 2013–14, when Oil Kings won Memorial Cup and Kulda received Stafford Smythe Memorial Trophy as Memorial Cup Most Valuable Player.

=== Professional ===
In 2015–16 season Kulda moved back to Latvia and joined his hometown club Dinamo Riga of KHL. He made his KHL debut on 3 September 2015, in overtime loss against Medveščak Zagreb.

After a three-year absence, highlighted with a lone season with PSG Berani Zlín of the Czech Extraliga, Kulda returned to Dinamo Riga on a one-year contract as a free agent on 7 August 2021.

== International play ==
Kulda represented Latvia in junior and U18 championships. In 2016, he made his debut in 2016 World Championships in opening match overtime loss against Sweden.

== Personal life ==
Edgars Kulda is the younger brother of Arturs Kulda.

== Career statistics ==
=== Regular season and playoffs ===
			Regular season					Playoffs
Season	Team	League	GP	G	A	Pts	PIM	GP	G	A	Pts	PIM
2009–10	SK Rīga 18	LAT U18	17	36	27	63	8	—	—	—	—	—
2011–12	HK Rīga	MHL	1	0	0	0	0	—	—	—	—	—
2011–12	HK Juniors Rīga	MHL B	33	15	11	26	81	7	2	9	11	4
2011–12	HK Juniors Rīga	LAT	25	21	15	36	18	5	3	2	5	0
2012–13	Edmonton Oil Kings	WHL	64	6	11	17	34	22	2	12	14	10
2013–14	Edmonton Oil Kings	WHL	66	30	30	60	57	21	10	12	22	12
2014–15	Edmonton Oil Kings	WHL	47	13	17	30	35	5	0	2	2	4
2015–16	Dinamo Rīga	KHL	39	4	3	7	23	—	—	—	—	—
2016–17	Dinamo Rīga	KHL	39	3	6	9	6	—	—	—	—	—
2017–18	Dinamo Rīga	KHL	31	1	0	1	33	—	—	—	—	—
2017–18	HK Liepāja	LAT	—	—	—	—	—	5	2	3	5	0
2018–19	PSG Berani Zlín	ELH	52	11	11	22	32	5	0	0	0	2
2019–20	Saryarka Karaganda	VHL	37	12	8	20	16	6	2	1	3	0
2020–21	Metallurg Novokuznetsk	VHL	41	8	8	16	14	14	2	5	7	5
2021–22	Dinamo Rīga	KHL	18	0	3	3	6	—	—	—	—	—
2021–22	HK Zemgale/LLU	LAT	16	10	20	30	4	10	4	8	12	0
KHL totals			127	8	12	20	68	—	—	—	—	—

=== International ===
Year	Team	Event	Result	GP	G	A	Pts	PIM
2012	Latvia	WJC18	9th	6	1	1	2	14
2013	Latvia	WJC	10th	6	2	4	6	0
2014	Latvia	WJC D1A	12th	5	1	6	7	2
2016	Latvia	WC	13th	7	0	0	0	0
Junior totals				29	8	15	23	22
Senior totals				7	0	0	0	0

== Awards and honours ==
Award	Year	Ref
WHL
Memorial Cup champion	2014	
Stafford Smythe Memorial Trophy	2014	
