= Edmonton Oil Kings =

Western Hockey League team in Edmonton, Alberta

- City: Edmonton, Alberta, Canada
- League: Western Hockey League
- Conference: Eastern
- Division: Central
- Founded: 2006
- Home arena: Rogers Place
- Colours: Red, royal blue, gold, white
- Owner: Oilers Entertainment Group
- General manager: Kirt Hill
- Head coach: Jason Smith
- Website: chl.ca/whl-oilkings

Championships
- Regular season titles: 1 (2011–12)
- Playoff championships: Memorial Cup: 1 (2014); Ed Chynoweth Cup: 3 (2012, 2014, 2022); Conference Championships: 4 (2011–12, 2012–13, 2013–14, 2021–22)

Current uniform

The Edmonton Oil Kings are a Canadian junior ice hockey team based in Edmonton that play in the Western Hockey League (WHL). The team, founded in 2006, shares an ownership group with the National Hockey League's Edmonton Oilers. The team is the fourth WHL team based in Edmonton, and its identity connects to the original Oil Kings club, which was one of the league's founding franchises in 1966. The Oil Kings are three-time WHL champions and won the 2014 Memorial Cup.

== Franchise history ==
=== Earlier Edmonton teams ===
Edmonton has a long history in the Western Hockey League. The original Oil Kings, owned and managed by Bill Hunter, were one of the league's founding franchises in 1966, and one of its most successful, winning back-to-back championships in 1970 and 1971. However, the arrival of the Edmonton Oilers in the World Hockey Association led to the Oil Kings relocating to Portland in 1976, becoming the Winter Hawks. The Oil Kings were briefly resurrected for a single season in 1978–79, when the Flin Flon Bombers played in Edmonton before moving on to Great Falls, Montana. Edmonton was awarded an expansion franchise in 1996—the Edmonton Ice—but the team survived only two seasons before moving to Cranbrook, British Columbia, and becoming the Kootenay Ice—the team had found itself in conflict with the Oilers and was barred from playing at Northlands Coliseum, playing instead at the Northlands Agricom. These challenges, along with similar difficulties in Calgary, Vancouver, and Winnipeg, suggested that the WHL struggled to compete with professional hockey in Western Canada's largest markets.

Alternate logo introduced by the team in 2013.

=== Return of the Kings ===
In 2004, with the Calgary Hitmen—owned by the Calgary Flames—leading the WHL in attendance for the fourth consecutive season, and the Vancouver Giants also proving to be a success, the ownership group of the Oilers put out an open offer of $5 million to purchase and relocate any existing WHL franchise. With no takers, and with the 2004–05 NHL lockout looming, the Oilers chose to relocate their American Hockey League affiliate to Rexall Place. Despite finishing third in the AHL in attendance and having publicly promised to operate the team in Edmonton for at least three seasons, the Oilers suspended the Edmonton Road Runners after only one season with the return of the NHL. The Oilers then resumed their quest for a WHL team.

When the sale of the Tri-City Americans to interests in Chilliwack, British Columbia, failed, the WHL placed an expansion team in Chilliwack instead. While the league had earlier stopped considering further expansion, believing 20 teams was an ideal size, the addition of the Chilliwack Bruins left the league with an odd number of franchises. Preferring an even number of teams, the league announced its return to Edmonton on March 16, 2006, with the granting of an expansion franchise, named the Oil Kings in homage to the former franchise. Moreover, the team adopted an updated version of the original Oil Kings' crown logo and jerseys.

=== Early success ===
The team began play in the 2007–08 WHL season. The Oil Kings struggled in their first four seasons, missing the playoffs twice and failing to win a playoff round. However, beginning in 2011–12, their fifth season, and led by the likes of Griffin Reinhart, Curtis Lazar, and Tristan Jarry, they began a three-year run of success. That season, they captured the Scotty Munro Memorial Trophy with the best regular season record, and advanced all the way to the championship series, where they defeated the Portland Winterhawks—the successor to the original Oil Kings—in seven games for the Ed Chynoweth Cup. At the 2012 Memorial Cup, the Oil Kings won their first game but then dropped two straight and were eliminated in a tie breaker against the Shawinigan Cataractes. The following season, Edmonton again topped the Eastern Conference and faced Portland again for the league championship. This time, Portland prevailed in a six-game series. In 2013–14, the Oil Kings and Winterhawks faced off for a third consecutive year in the playoff final; it was only the second time two teams contested the final three years in a row, with the first occurrence between the original Oil Kings and the Flin Flon Bombers from 1969 to 1971. In the 2014 meeting, the Oil Kings avenged the previous year's loss in a seven-game series, earning a berth in their second Memorial Cup tournament in three seasons.

At the 2014 Memorial Cup, the Oil Kings again dropped two of their preliminary round games. However, their one win was good enough to advance to the semi-final, where they defeated the Val-d'Or Foreurs in triple overtime—it was the longest game in Memorial Cup history—to advance to the final. In the final, Edmonton defeated the Guelph Storm 6–3 to capture the championship, Edmonton's first since the original Oil Kings won in 1966.

=== Second run of success ===
After four seasons near the bottom of the Central Division, including two years out of the playoffs, the Oil Kings topped the division four seasons in a row beginning in 2018–19. Their run of success was disrupted by the COVID-19 pandemic, which cut the 2019–20 season short and resulted in a shortened 2020–21 campaign that was played in-division only and without playoffs. Regular play resumed in 2021–22; led by Dylan Guenther and Sebastian Cossa, that season the Oil Kings won their third Ed Chynoweth Cup as WHL champions, defeating the Seattle Thunderbirds in the finals and advancing to the 2022 Memorial Cup. With only an overtime win over the Saint John Sea Dogs in three preliminary round games, the Oil Kings were eliminated from the tournament.

== Season-by-season record ==
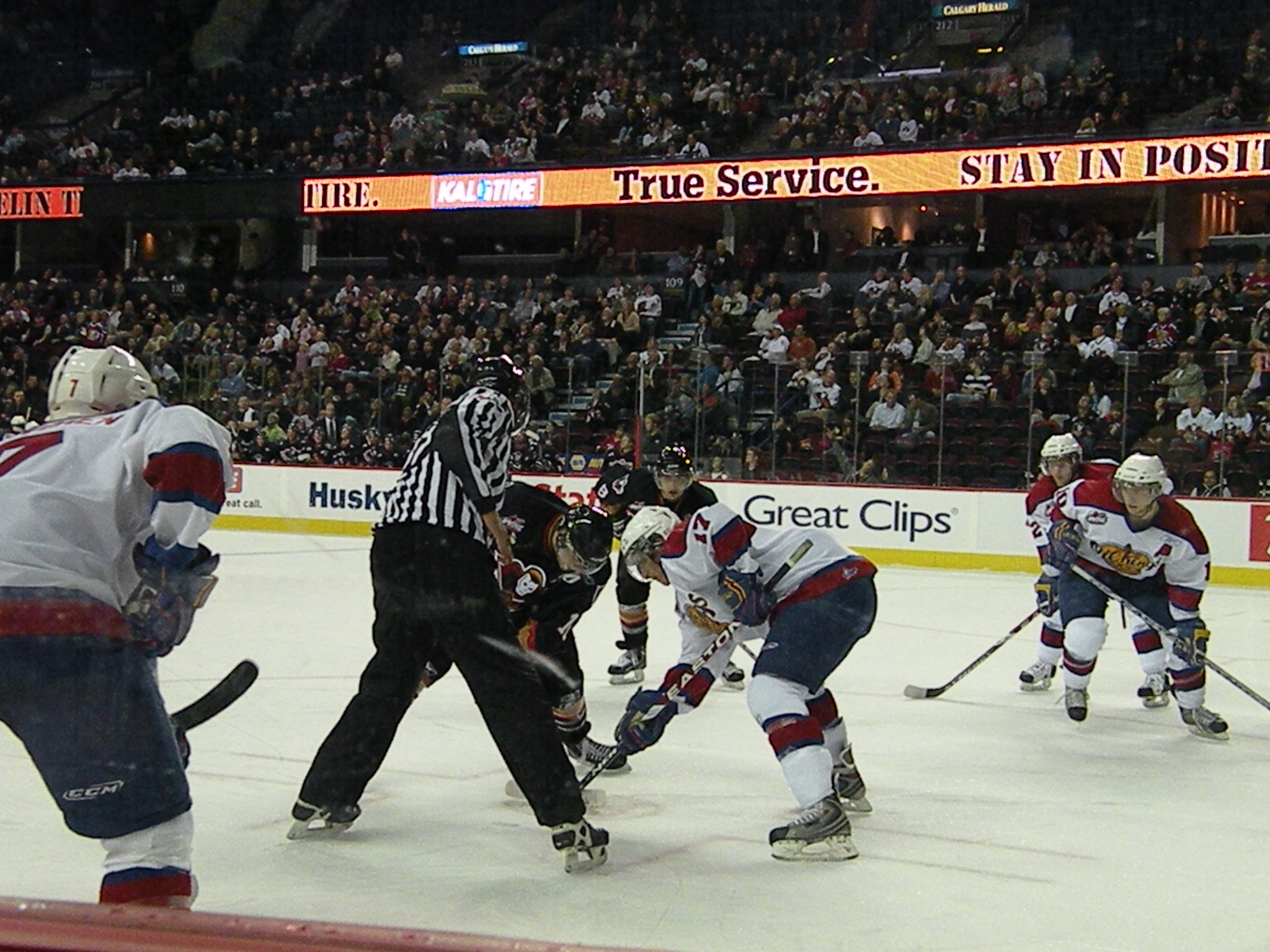
The Oil Kings face the Calgary Hitmen in the WHL's Battle of Alberta.

Note: GP = Games played, W = Wins, L = Losses, OTL = Overtime losses, SOL = Shootout losses Pts = Points, GF = Goals for, GA = Goals against

Season	GP	W	L	OTL	SOL	GF	GA	Points	Finish	Playoffs
2007–08	72	22	39	4	7	162	241	55	5th Central	Did not qualify
2008–09	72	29	34	4	5	191	252	67	5th Central	Lost Eastern Conference quarterfinal (Hitmen)
2009–10	72	16	43	4	9	169	285	45	6th Central	Did not qualify
2010–11	72	31	34	2	5	249	252	69	4th Central	Lost Eastern Conference quarterfinal (Rebels)
2011–12	72	50	15	3	4	310	193	107	1st Central	Won Championship (Winterhawks)
2012–13	72	51	15	2	4	278	155	108	1st Central	Lost Final (Winterhawks)
2013–14	72	50	19	2	1	290	179	103	1st Central	Won Championship (Winterhawks); Won Memorial Cup (Storm)
2014–15	72	34	31	4	3	217	204	75	5th Central	Lost Eastern Conference quarterfinal (Wheat Kings)
2015–16	72	29	36	6	1	197	238	65	4th Central	Lost Eastern Conference quarterfinal (Wheat Kings)
2016–17	72	23	43	5	1	193	292	52	5th Central	Did not qualify
2017–18	72	22	42	6	2	204	315	52	6th Central	Did not qualify
2018–19	68	42	18	4	4	259	196	92	1st Central	Lost Eastern Conference final (Raiders)
2019–20	64	42	12	6	4	239	167	94	1st Central	Cancelled due to the COVID-19 pandemic
2020–21	23	20	2	0	1	104	41	41	1st Central	No playoffs due to the COVID-19 pandemic
2021–22	68	50	14	3	1	295	182	104	1st Central	Won Championship (Thunderbirds)
2022–23	68	10	54	4	0	131	338	24	6th Central	Did not qualify
2023–24	68	27	37	3	1	227	301	58	6th Central	Did not qualify
2024–25	68	37	27	2	2	248	211	78	4th Central	Lost Eastern Conference quarterfinal (Raiders)
2025–26	68	45	18	3	2	287	205	95	2nd Central	Lost Eastern Conference quarterfinal (Blades)

== Championship history ==
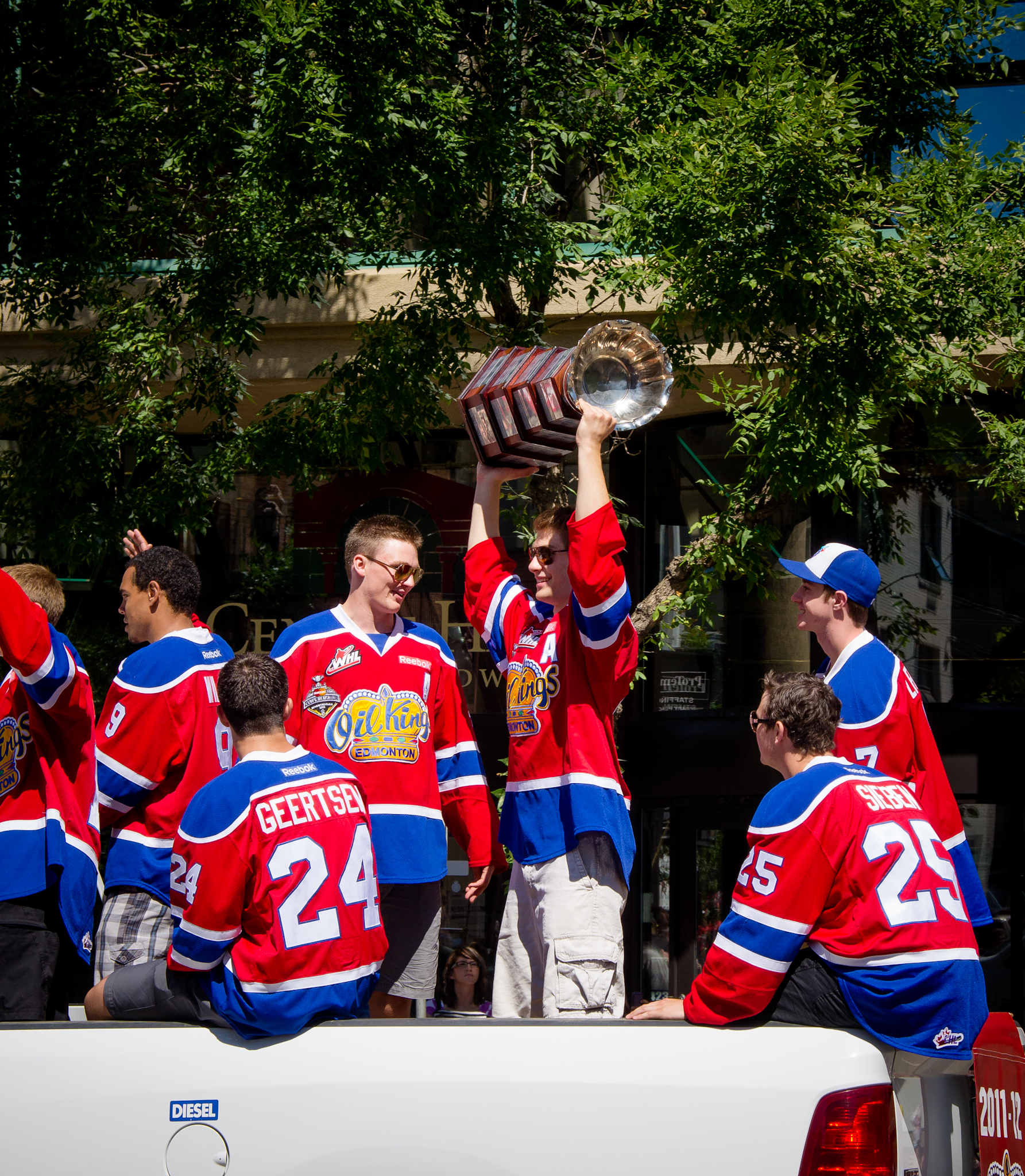
- The Oil Kings celebrating their 2012 championship.
  Memorial Cup (1): 2014
- Ed Chynoweth Cup (3): 2011–12, 2013–14, 2021–22
- Scotty Munro Memorial trophy (1): 2011-12
- Conference titles (4): 2011–12, 2012–13, 2013–14, 2021–22
- Division titles (7): 2011–12, 2012–13, 2013–14, 2018–19, 2019–20, 2020–21, 2021–22

=== WHL Championship finals ===
- 2011–12: Win, 4–3 vs Portland Winterhawks
- 2012–13: Loss, 2–4 vs Portland Winterhawks
- 2013–14: Win, 4–3 vs Portland Winterhawks
- 2021–22: Win, 4–2 vs Seattle Thunderbirds

=== Memorial Cup finals ===
- 2014: Win, 6–3 vs Guelph Storm

== Players ==
=== NHL alumni ===
- Brandon Baddock
- Laurent Brossoit
- Sebastian Cossa
- Trey Fix-Wolansky
- Mason Geertsen
- Dylan Guenther
- Kaiden Guhle
- Tristan Jarry
- Curtis Lazar
- Keegan Lowe
- Dysin Mayo
- David Musil
- Jake Neighbours
- Mark Pysyk
- Griffin Reinhart
- Matthew Robertson
- Henrik Samuelsson
- Ashton Sautner
- Justin Sourdif
- Tomas Vincour

=== NHL first-round draft picks ===
- 2010: Mark Pysyk, 23rd overall, Buffalo Sabres
- 2012: Griffin Reinhart, 4th overall, New York Islanders
- 2012: Henrik Samuelsson, 27th overall, Phoenix Coyotes
- 2013: Curtis Lazar, 17th overall, Ottawa Senators
- 2020: Kaiden Guhle, 16th overall, Montreal Canadiens
- 2020: Jake Neighbours, 26th overall, St. Louis Blues
- 2021: Dylan Guenther, 9th overall, Arizona Coyotes
- 2021: Sebastian Cossa, 15th overall, Detroit Red Wings

== Awards ==
Jim Piggott Memorial Trophy

- Dylan Guenther: 2019–20

WHL Plus-Minus Award

- Ashton Sautner: 2013–14

Brad Hornung Trophy

- Dylan Wruck: 2012–13

WHL Playoff MVP

- Laurent Brossoit: 2011–12
- Griffin Reinhart: 2013–14
- Kaiden Guhle: 2021–22

Dunc McCallum Memorial Trophy

- Brad Lauer: 2019–20

Lloyd Saunders Memorial Trophy

- Bob Green: 2011–12, 2012–13

St. Clair Group Trophy

- 2018–19

Doug Wickenheiser Memorial Trophy

- Will Warm: 2018–19
- Luke Prokop: 2021–22

=== Memorial Cup awards ===
Stafford Smythe Memorial Trophy

- Edgars Kulda: 2014

Ed Chynoweth Trophy

- Henrik Samuelsson: 2014

George Parsons Trophy

- Curtis Lazar: 2014

== See also ==
- List of ice hockey teams in Alberta
