= Colton Sissons =

Canadian ice hockey player (born 1993)

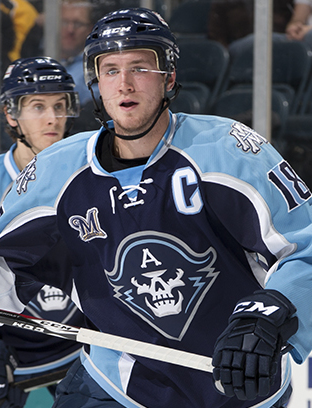
- Sissons with the Milwaukee Admirals in 2015
- Born: November 5, 1993 (age 33) North Vancouver, British Columbia, Canada
- Height: 6 ft 1 in (185 cm)
- Weight: 200 lb (91 kg; 14 st 4 lb)
- Position: Centre
- Shoots: Right
- NHL team Former teams: Toronto Maple Leafs; Nashville Predators; Vegas Golden Knights
- NHL draft: 50th overall, 2012; Nashville Predators
- Playing career: 2013–present

Colton Sissons (born November 5, 1993) is a Canadian professional ice hockey player who is a centre for the Toronto Maple Leafs of the National Hockey League (NHL). Sissons was selected by the Nashville Predators in the second round, 50th overall, of the 2012 NHL entry draft, with whom he played the first eleven seasons of his career.

Growing up in North Vancouver, British Columbia, Sissons played with the Vancouver NW Giants of the BC Hockey Major Midget League and Westside Warriors of the British Columbia Hockey League. Following this, he joined the Kelowna Rockets of the Western Hockey League (WHL) for three seasons. During his 2012–13 season with the Rockets, Sissons scored 28 goals and 39 assists through 61 games and was named team MVP and the top defensive forward for the season.

Sissons concluded his major junior ice hockey career in 2013 upon joining the Predators' American Hockey League (AHL) affiliate, the Milwaukee Admirals. While centering the Admirals' first line, Sissons was selected for the 2014 AHL All-Star Game after being tied for second amongst league rookies with 13 goals. Sissons completed his first professional season by appearing in 17 NHL games and tallying four points with the Predators. Prior to the start of the 2015–16 season, Sissons became the youngest player in franchise history to be named captain of the Admirals.

== Early life ==
Sissons was born on November 5, 1993, in North Vancouver, British Columbia, to parents Doug and Debbie. Growing up, he played minor ice hockey with the North Vancouver and North Shore Winter Club. As a youth, he played in the 2006 Quebec International Pee-Wee Hockey Tournament with his North Vancouver team.

== Playing career ==
=== Amateur ===
During the 2008–09 season, Sissons was the youngest forward on the Vancouver NW Giants of the BC Hockey Major Midget League. During this season, he ranked fifth overall in scoring across the league with 54 points as he led them to the BC Major Midget League Championships. At the age of 15, Sissons was drafted by the Saskatoon Blades of the Western Hockey League (WHL) but he was unsure if he wanted to forgo his NCAA eligibility by signing with them. While playing midget ice hockey in Vancouver, he was teammates with future Edmonton Oilers player Ryan Nugent-Hopkins. Following this, Sissons competed with the British Columbia Hockey League's Westside Warriors, where he tallied six goals and 22 points through 58 games. In 2010, Sissons's playing rights were traded to the Kelowna Rockets in exchange for Curt Gogol.

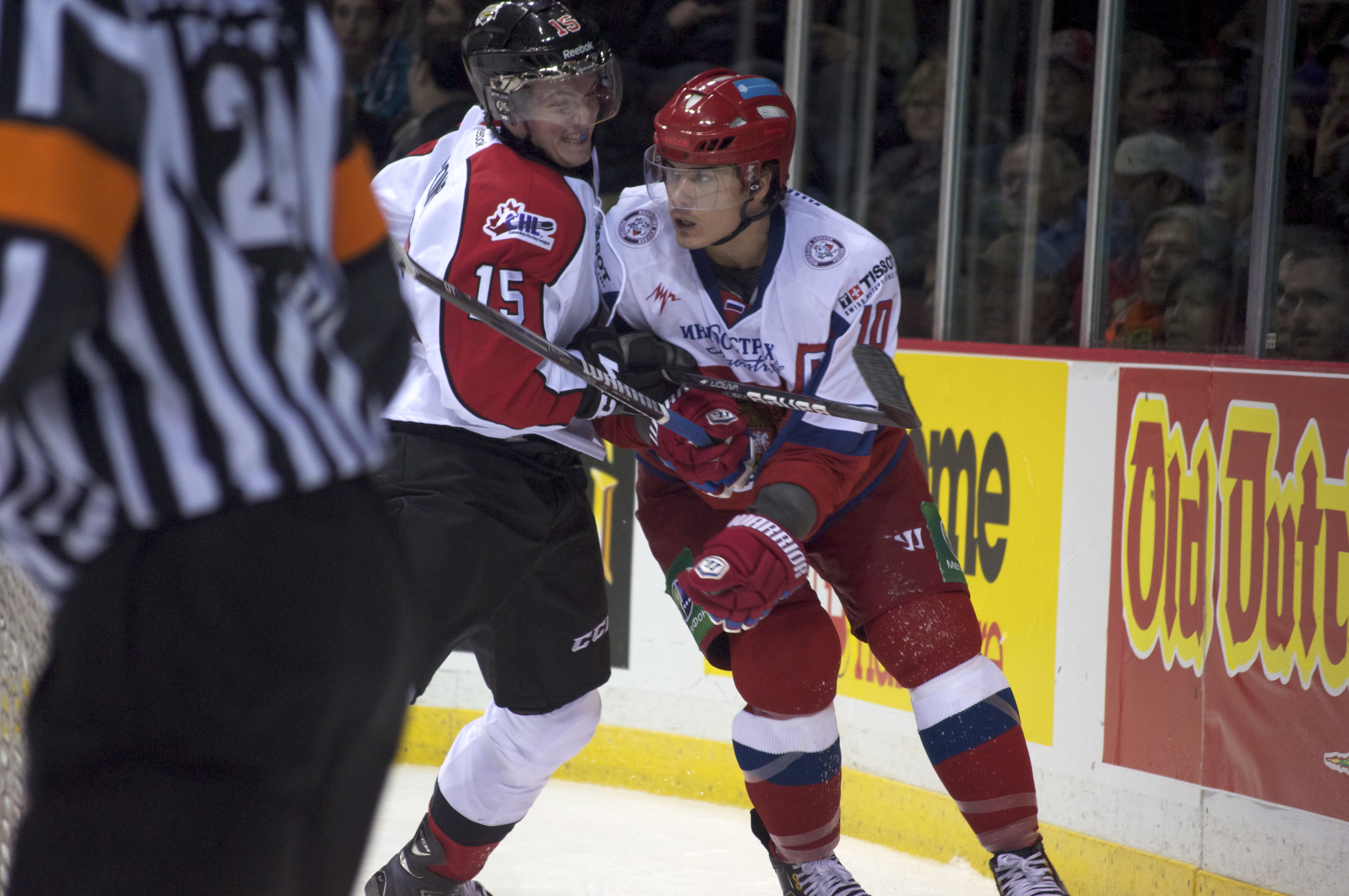
Sissons (left) checking Nail Yakupov during the CHL Canada/Russia Series

Sissons joined the Kelowna Rockets for the 2010–11 season, his rookie season. During the season, he recorded a hat-trick on February 16, 2011, to help the Rockets jump into first place in the WHL BC division. The goals, which were his 12th, 13th, and 14th of the season, also helped the Rockets improve to 32–23–0–1 in the season. In March, Sissons missed three games for the Rockets while recovering from a leg injury. At the conclusion of the season, Sissons won the Rockets' Rookie of the Year Award and Plus/Minus Award. He was also invited to participate in the NHL Research, Development and Orientation Camp.

In his first year of NHL draft eligibility, Sissons finished his second season in the WHL with 26 goals, including a team-leading 13 power play, through 58 games as the Rockets finished in sixth place in the Western Conference. He was named captain of Team Orr for the CHL/NHL Top Prospects Game after tallying 25 goals and 36 points through 48 games. Leading up to the 2012 NHL entry draft, Sissons was ranked 14th amongst all North American skaters by the NHL Central Scouting Bureau. He was eventually drafted 50th overall by the Nashville Predators and signed a three-year entry-level contract with the team. Sissons was returned to the Rockets for the 2012–13 season, where he scored 28 goals and 39 assists through 61 games. During the season, he was invited to participate in Team Canada's national junior team training camp but had to pull out after suffering a left arm injury. Despite this, he was named the Rockets MVP and top defensive forward for the season.

=== Professional ===
==== Nashville Predators ====
After attending the Predators' 2013 training camp, Sissons was re-assigned to their American Hockey League (AHL) affiliate, the Milwaukee Admirals, for the 2013–14 season. While centering the Admirals first line, he tallied his first professional point, an assist, in his debut game. Prior to turning 20, Sissons had recorded four goals and two assists in his first eight games to be tied for second in scoring across the team. His maturity earned him praise from Admirals coach Dean Evason, who said: "It's as if he's been a 10-year pro in how he goes about his business, how he prepares for games, and how he is with his teammates off the ice." As the season continued, Sissons continued to produce and recorded a five-game point streak from November 9 through November 13. By January, he was tied for second amongst league rookies with 13 goals and was subsequently selected for the 2014 AHL All-Star Game. As a result of his play, Sissons earned his first NHL recall on January 27, 2014, He subsequently made his NHL debut the following evening, registering an assist to help the Predators to a 4–3 win over the Winnipeg Jets. Sissons played 10:49 of ice time and finished with a +1 rating. His point marked the first assist from a Predators rookie in his NHL debut since Nick Spaling in 2009. Sissons was returned to the AHL after playing in three games but was recalled again on February 8. In his 14th NHL game, Sissons scored his first career NHL goal against Matt Hackett in a 6–1 win over the Buffalo Sabres. The goal came at 6:26 in the first period to give the Predators a 1–0 lead. Sissons completed his first professional season by appearing in 17 games and tallying four points with the Predators.

Upon concluding his rookie season, the Predators fired Barry Trotz and replaced him with Peter Laviolette. Following the coaching change, Sissons said it helped boost his excitement level for his 2014–15 season in the AHL. He spent the entirety of the season with the Admirals, where he became the first Admirals player in their AHL history to record back-to-back 25-goal seasons to start his career.

Prior to the start of the 2015–16 season, Sissons became the first forward since Tony Hrkac to be named captain for the Admirals alongside alternates Cody Bass and Coner Allen. Following the announcement, Sissons also became the youngest captain in Admirals history. After an 18-months absence, Sissons made a return to the NHL, receiving a recall from the AHL by the Predators on November 10, 2015. He appeared later that night, playing on the fourth line in a high-scoring 7–5 victory over the Ottawa Senators. He posted the Predators' opening goal of the evening at 6:55 of the first period to beat goaltender Craig Anderson. Sissons played in eight games before being re-assigned to the AHL after Eric Nystrom was activated off injured reserve. By February 2016, Sissons had tallied two points through 19 appearances for the Predators and had a 59 percent success rate in face-offs to rank the best among all NHLers taking at least 100 draws. As a result, Sissons signed a three-year, $1.875 million contract extension to remain with the Predators organization. The following month, Sissons was recalled to the NHL level and changed his jersey number from 84 to 10 because "Eighty-four was a little bit too skilled of a number." On March 8, his first game following his recall, Sissons recorded a goal and an assist in the 4–2 win over the Winnipeg Jets for his first multi-point game. As well, he continued to succeed in the face-off circle and ranked second on the team in face-off wins. Sissons and the Predators qualified for the 2016 Stanley Cup playoffs, where they faced the Anaheim Ducks in the first round. Through 10 post-season games, Sissons remained pointless.

Sissons returned to the Predators for their pre-season action, where he played in two exhibition games and logged 12:49 minutes of ice time. In the first year of his new contract, Sissons began the 2016–17 season on the Predators' fourth-line before moving up the lineup. He was eventually teamed up with captain Mike Fisher and Austin Watson for the Predators shutdown line and scored his first career NHL hat-trick in January. His hat-trick came in a 6–1 win over the Tampa Bay Lightning at Amalie Arena. After being scratched for seven games between February 23 and March 7, Sisson returned to the Predators lineup and broke out offensively. During a game against the Calgary Flames on March 27, Sisson scored a goal to help lead the team to a 3–1 win in his 100th career NHL game.

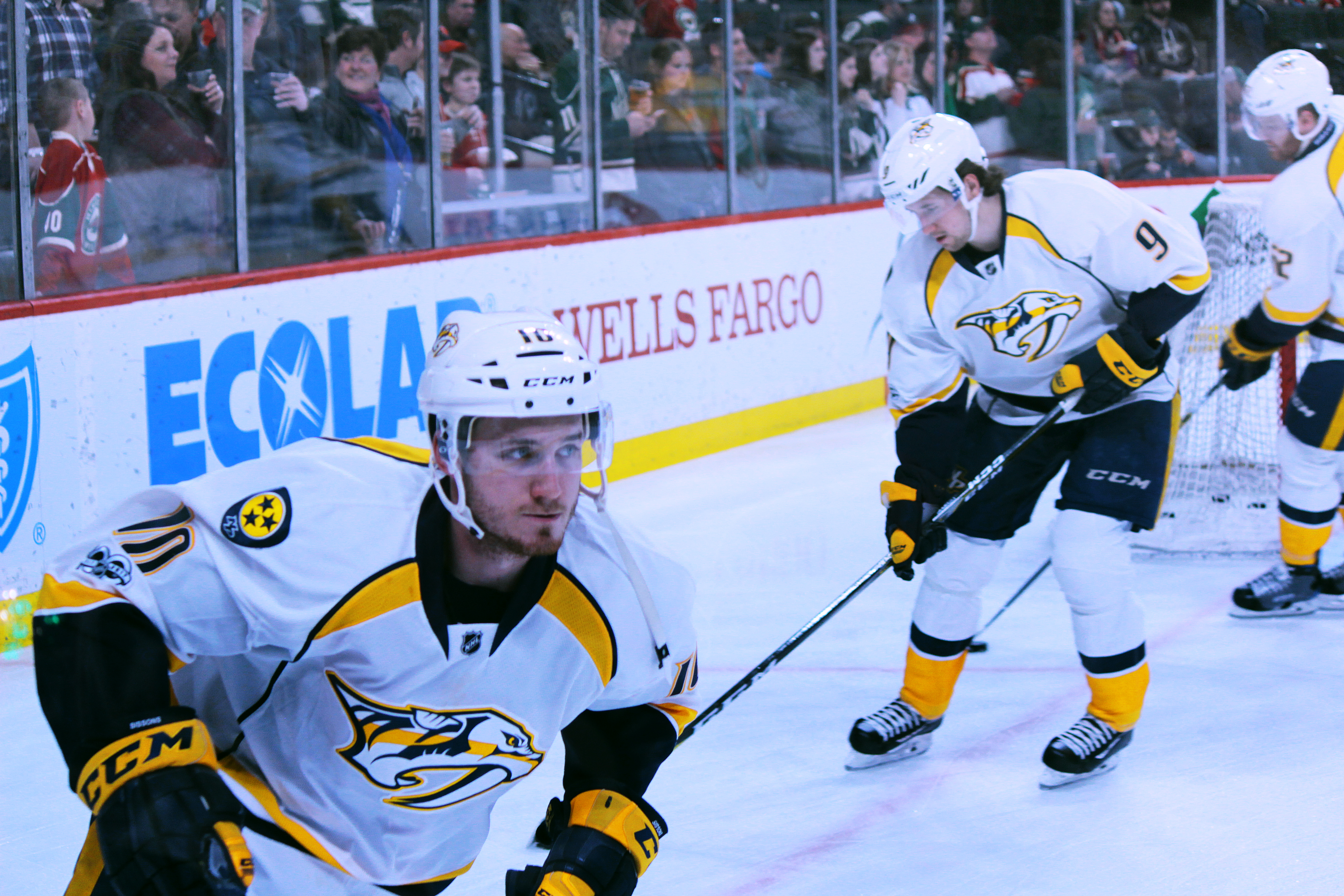
Sissons (left) and Filip Forsberg in 2017

As the Predators narrowly qualified for the 2017 playoffs as the eighth seed in the Western Conference, they met the top-seeded Chicago Blackhawks in the first round. In Game 2, Sissons scored his first career playoff goal on Blackhawks' goaltender Corey Crawford to become one of four Predators players (besides Ryan Ellis, Kevin Fiala and Harry Zolnierczyk, respectively) to score their first career playoff goals and lead the team to a 5–0 win in the game for a 2–0 series lead. Sissons continued to produce and scored another goal in Game 4 to lead the Predators to a four game sweep of the Blackhawks. Following this win, Sissons and the Predators met the St. Louis Blues in Round Two. After tallying two assists in a Game 3 win over the Blues, Sissons had recorded two goals and four assists through seven games. With his assistance, the Predators beat the Blues and met with the Anaheim Ducks in the 2017 Western Conference Final. Due to injuries to top-line forwards Ryan Johansen and Mike Fisher, Sissons was elevated to the first-line role in Game 5 of the Western Conference Final. During Game 6, he scored a hat-trick—including the game-winning goal—as the Predators defeated the Ducks 6–3 to win the Clarence S. Campbell Bowl trophy and advance to the Stanley Cup Finals for the first time in franchise history. Sissons also set another record by becoming the first player to score a hat trick in a series-clinching win in the conference final since Patrick Kane in 2013. He remained in this shutdown role as the Predators met the Pittsburgh Penguins in the 2017 Stanley Cup Finals. During Game 5 of the Finals, which the Penguins won 6–0, Sissons received a Match penalty after cross-checking Olli Maatta with 34 seconds remaining in the period. He was not suspended following the game and remained eligible to play in Game 6. Following the Predator's elimination from the playoffs, they released their 2017 NHL expansion draft for the Vegas Golden Knights which did not include Sissons.

In the Predators home opener for the 2017–18 season, Sissons and Roman Josi each missed the game due to injuries. Following an injury to Nick Bonino in October, Sissons took on increased responsibility including penalty killing. On March 17, 2018, Sissons scored two goals to help the Predators become the first team to clinch a playoff spot. During their first round playoff series against the Colorado Avalanche, Sissons played on the Predators top-line alongside Nick Bonino and Austin Watson. By Game 4, Sissons had accumulated three goals and two assists for five points as a top-line winger while his line combined for nine goals and 19 points as the series concluded. With his assistance, the Predators beat the Avalanche in Game 6 and qualified for the Western Conference Second Round against the Winnipeg Jets. He finished the post-season with seven points through 13 games.

Following his third playoff run, Sissons returned to the Predators for their 2018 training camp and pre-season games. He played in four pre-season games and took 23 faceoffs, winning 16 of them. He continued to lead the team in faceoff wins as the season continued and finished second behind Ryan Johansen by winning 53.1 percent of his draws. Sissons began the month of October on the Predators fourth line between Zac Rinaldo and Miikka Salomaki as the team held a 5–1–0 record. On October 25, 2018, during a game against the New Jersey Devils, Sissons played in his 200th NHL game while teammate Mattias Ekholm played in his 400th. A few weeks later, on November 8, 2018, Sissons ended a 13 game-drought with his second career hat-trick in a 4–1 win over the Colorado Avalanche to help the Predators to their fourth consecutive win. Following his hat-trick, Sissons picked up in scoring and tallied six points, three goals and three assists, in five games in December. One of those goals came in overtime to lead the Predators to their 21st win of the season. By December 21, Sissons had scored seven goals and nine assists for 16 points before being injured during a game against the Chicago Blackhawks. Sissons remained out of the Predators lineup for seven games before returning on January 5, 2019, for a 4–1 win over the Montreal Canadiens. During the 2018–19 season, Sissons was one of the Predators' top penalty-killers and averaged the most time on ice when shorthanded with two minutes per game. Due to his on-ice success, the Predators re-signed Sissons to a seven-year, $20 million contract extension.

In the first year of his newest contract, Sissons dropped in production and tallied nine goals and six assists for 15 points through 57 games. On December 28, 2019, Sissons was placed on Injured Reserve to recover from a lower-body injury. On January 21, 2020, Sissons was re-assigned to the Milwaukee Admirals on a conditioning stint while recovering from his lower-body injury. When the season was paused due to the COVID-19 pandemic, Sissons had tallied nine goals and six assists for 15 points through 57 games. This marked the third consecutive season in which he reached at least the 15-point mark. He also placed fourth on the team in faceoff wins by winning 51.3 percent. Once the season resumed, Sissons and the Predators faced the Arizona Coyotes in the Stanley Cup Qualifiers. While staying in the Edmonton Bubble, Sissons worked with Predators reporter Adam Vingan to write a diary entry for The Athletic depicting his experiences.

As a result of the delayed start of the 2020 Stanley Cup playoffs, the 2020–21 season began in January 2021. The Predators began the season strong and won six consecutive games before losing to the Dallas Stars. In the losing game, Sissons scored the Predators lone goal in the eventual 4–1 loss. A few games later, Sissons tallied his 100th career NHL point with an assist on Nick Cousins's goal to beat the Detroit Red Wings 7–1. At the end of the month, Sissons was tied with Rocco Grimaldi for fourth in scoring on the Predators with seven, behind Mikael Granlund, Viktor Arvidsson, and Roman Josi. He suffered a lower body injury in early May and missed one game before returning to the ice for a loss to the Columbus Blue Jackets. In his return, Sissons recorded three shots on net through 15:28 minutes of ice time. As the Predators qualified for the 2021 Stanley Cup playoffs against the Carolina Hurricanes, he was one of ten players on their roster who had also helped them reach the Stanley Cup Finals in 2017. He collected two points through six games as the Predators lost to the Hurricanes. Following their elimination, the Predators released their player protection list ahead of the 2021 NHL expansion draft which did not include Sissons.

Sissons returned to the Predators for the 2021–22 season as part of the Predators physical unit with some combination of Sissons, Tanner Jeannot, Yakov Trenin, and Mathieu Olivier. On December 4, 2021, during a 4–3 win over the Montreal Canadiens, Sissons played in his 400th career NHL game.

==== Vegas Golden Knights ====
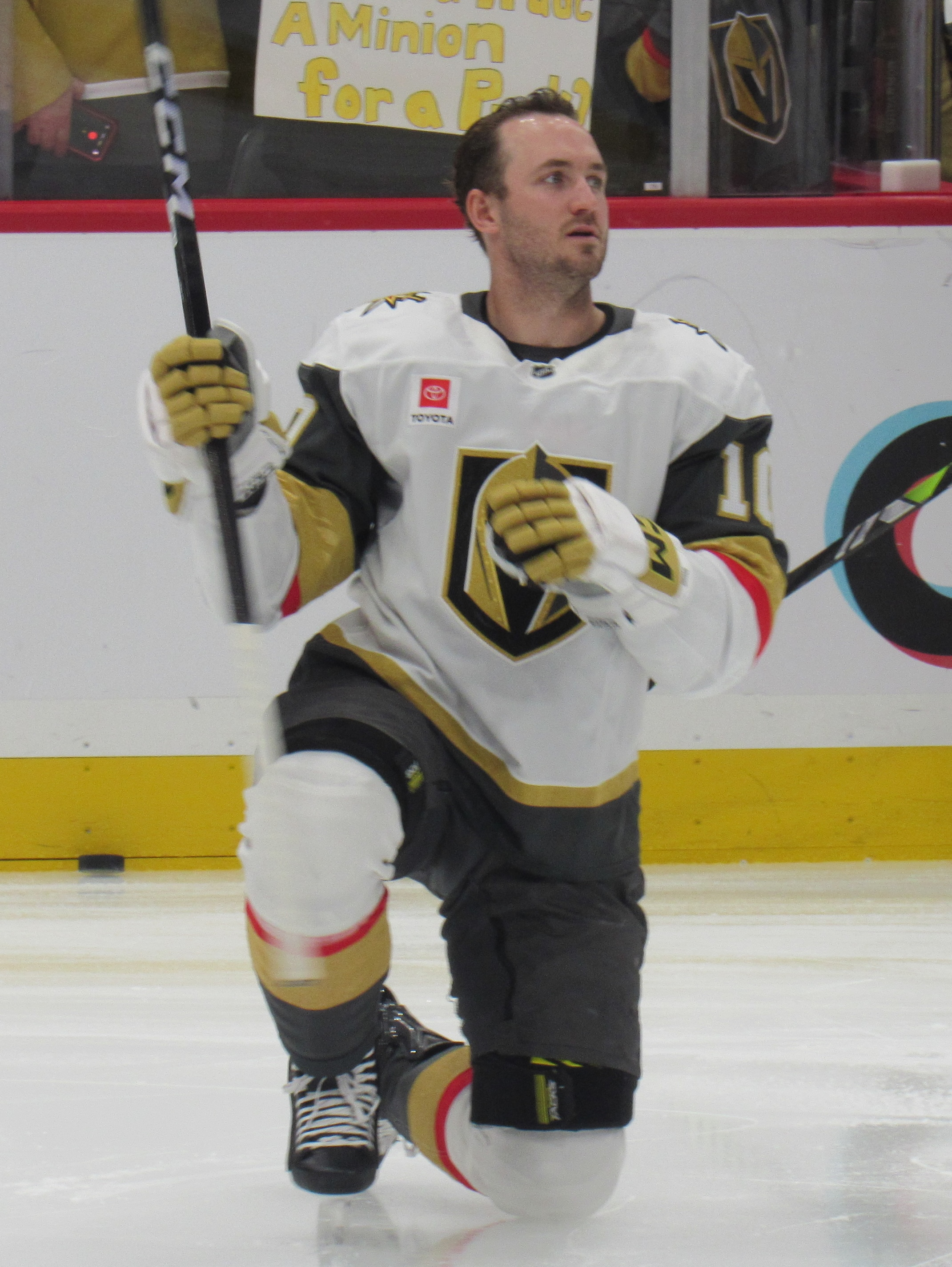
Sissons with the Golden Knights in 2026

Following the 2024–25 season, Sissons was traded to the Vegas Golden Knights alongside Jeremy Lauzon, in exchange for Nicolas Hague and a conditional third-round pick in 2027, ending his 12-year tenure with the Predators organization. Sissons recorded his first point with Vegas in a 6–5 win over the Boston Bruins on October 16, 2025, assisting on a first-period Cole Reinhardt goal. On November 29, Sissons scored his first goal with Vegas in a 4–3 win over the San Jose Sharks.

==== Toronto Maple Leafs ====
On July 1, 2026, Sissons signed a two-year, $8.5 million contract with the Toronto Maple Leafs.

== Career statistics ==
			Regular season					Playoffs
Season	Team	League	GP	G	A	Pts	PIM	GP	G	A	Pts	PIM
2008–09	Vancouver NW Giants	BCMML	39	30	24	54	44	—	—	—	—	—
2009–10	Westside Warriors	BCHL	58	6	16	22	78	11	1	1	2	4
2010–11	Kelowna Rockets	WHL	63	17	24	41	46	10	3	3	6	6
2011–12	Kelowna Rockets	WHL	58	26	15	41	62	4	1	1	2	2
2012–13	Kelowna Rockets	WHL	61	28	39	67	54	—	—	—	—	—
2013–14	Milwaukee Admirals	AHL	62	25	19	44	8	3	0	1	1	2
2013–14	Nashville Predators	NHL	17	1	3	4	4	—	—	—	—	—
2014–15	Milwaukee Admirals	AHL	76	25	17	42	27	—	—	—	—	—
2015–16	Milwaukee Admirals	AHL	38	8	11	19	31	—	—	—	—	—
2015–16	Nashville Predators	NHL	34	4	2	6	12	10	0	0	0	8
2016–17	Nashville Predators	NHL	58	8	2	10	12	22	6	6	12	16
2017–18	Nashville Predators	NHL	81	9	18	27	42	13	3	4	7	8
2018–19	Nashville Predators	NHL	75	15	15	30	23	6	0	0	0	6
2019–20	Nashville Predators	NHL	57	9	6	15	20	4	0	1	1	0
2020–21	Nashville Predators	NHL	54	8	7	15	18	6	0	2	2	2
2021–22	Nashville Predators	NHL	79	7	21	28	30	4	0	2	2	0
2022–23	Nashville Predators	NHL	82	12	18	30	20	—	—	—	—	—
2023–24	Nashville Predators	NHL	81	15	20	35	38	6	1	0	1	6
2024–25	Nashville Predators	NHL	72	7	14	21	22	—	—	—	—	—
2025–26	Vegas Golden Knights	NHL	66	6	5	11	28	22	2	6	8	6
NHL totals			756	101	131	232	269	93	12	21	33	52

== Awards and honours ==
Honours	Year
CHL Top Prospects Game – Captain of Team Orr	2012
