= Trevor Daley =

Canadian ice hockey player (born 1983)

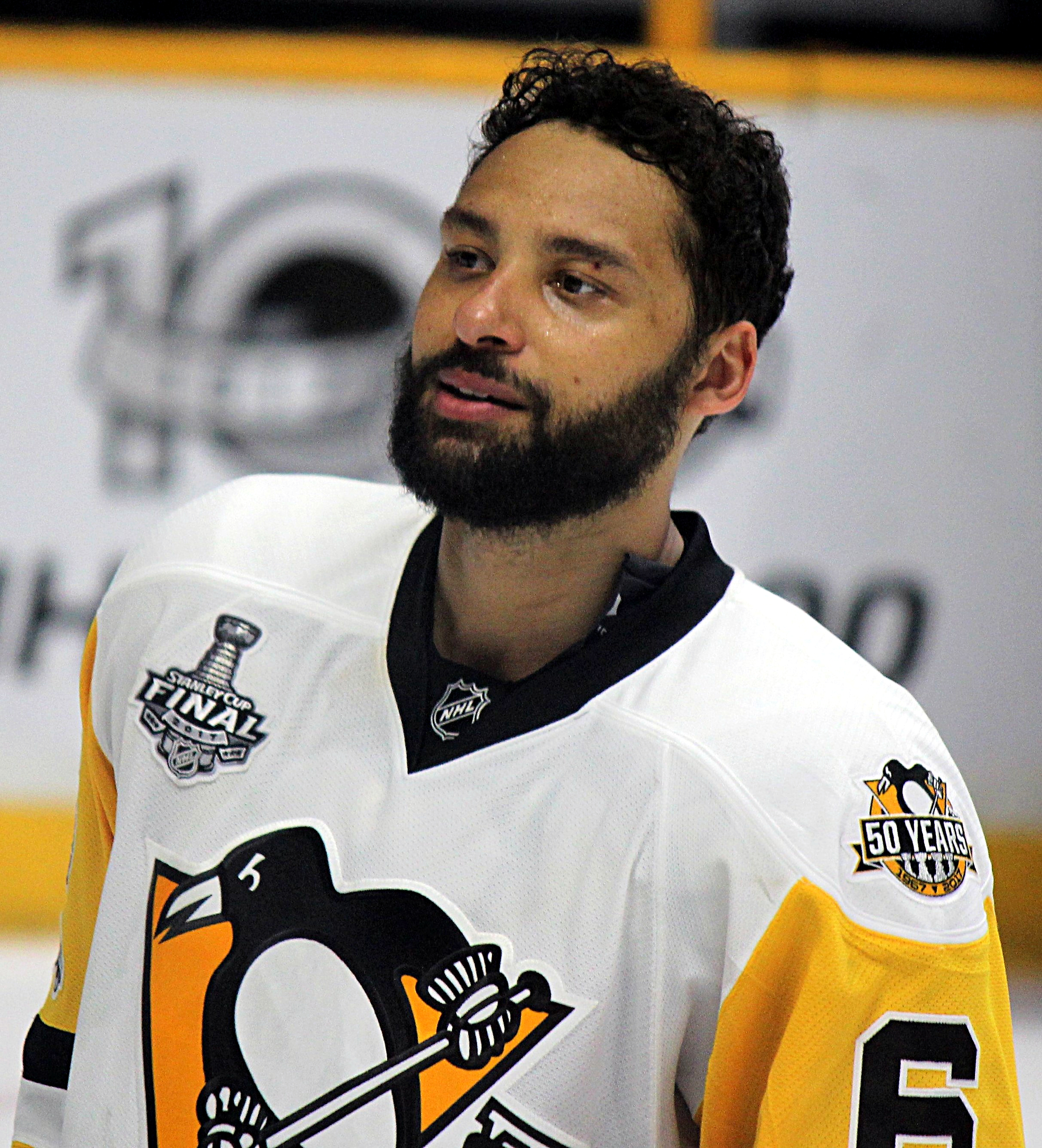
- Daley with the Pittsburgh Penguins in 2017
- Born: October 9, 1983 (age 42) Toronto, Ontario, Canada
- Height: 5 ft 11 in (180 cm)
- Weight: 195 lb (88 kg; 13 st 13 lb)
- Position: Defence
- Shot: Left
- Played for: Dallas Stars; Chicago Blackhawks; Pittsburgh Penguins; Detroit Red Wings
- National team: Canada
- NHL draft: 43rd overall, 2002; Dallas Stars
- Playing career: 2003–2022

Trevor Daley (born October 9, 1983) is a Canadian former professional ice hockey defenceman, currently serving as a special assistant to the president of hockey operations for the Pittsburgh Penguins of the National Hockey League (NHL). He played sixteen seasons in the NHL for the Dallas Stars, Chicago Blackhawks, Pittsburgh Penguins and Detroit Red Wings. He won the Stanley Cup twice, both with the Penguins, in 2016 and 2017.

== Playing career ==
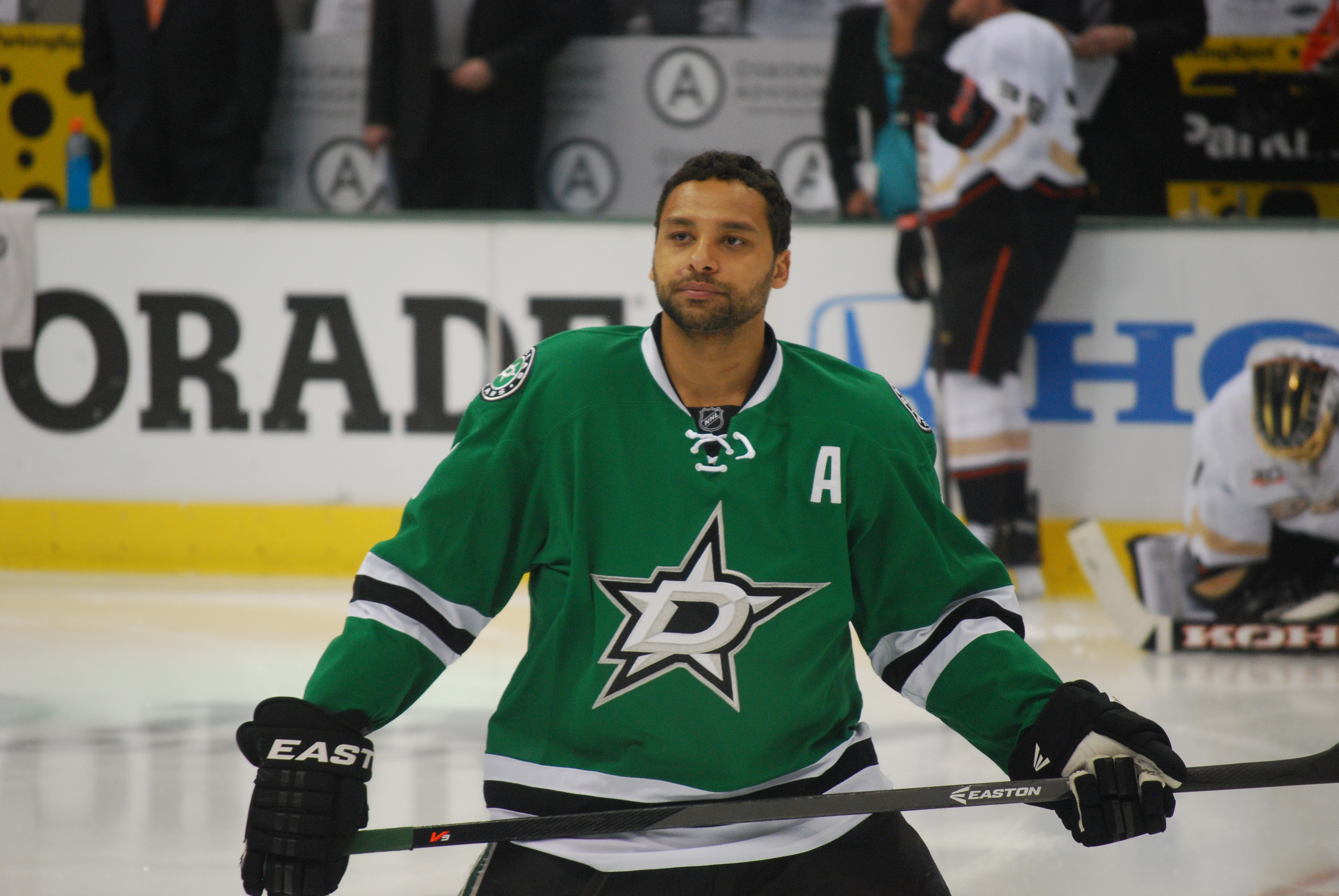
Daley with the Dallas Stars in April 2014 during the first round of the 2014 Stanley Cup playoffs

Daley was drafted by the Dallas Stars in the 2002 NHL entry draft, 43rd overall, in the second round from the Sault Ste. Marie Greyhounds of the Ontario Hockey League.

In his final year with the Greyhounds and as captain, Daley found himself the victim of a racial slur by then coach and general manager, former NHL goaltender John Vanbiesbrouck. Daley quit the team and upon the resignation of Vanbiesbrouck returned to the team three days later to finish out the 2002–03 season.

Daley made his NHL debut with the Stars in the 2003–04 season and established himself as a regular in the 2005–06 season when he played in a career-high 81 games and was named to the Canadian squad for the 2006 World Championships.

He played his 500th career NHL game on October 8, 2011, all with the Dallas Stars.

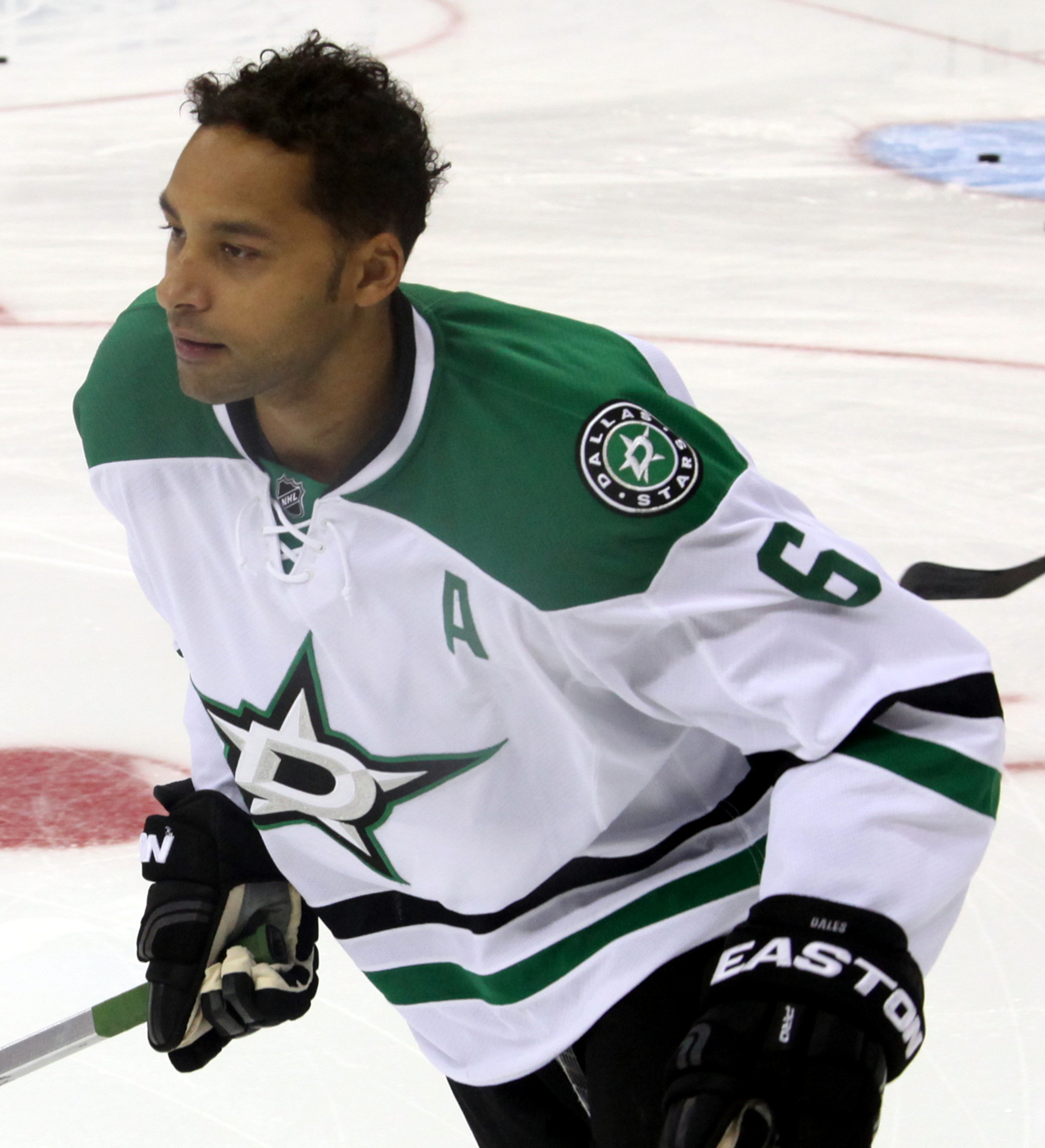
Daley in October 2014

On July 10, 2015, Daley and teammate Ryan Garbutt were traded to the Blackhawks in exchange for Patrick Sharp and Stephen Johns.

On December 14, 2015, he was traded to the Pittsburgh Penguins in exchange for Rob Scuderi. Daley scored his first goal with the Penguins on December 18, 2015 against the Boston Bruins. Daley was injured on May 20, 2016 and missed the remainder of the 2016 Stanley Cup playoffs, after suffering a broken left ankle in Game 4 of the Eastern Conference Final against the Tampa Bay Lightning. Daley won his first Stanley Cup when the Penguins defeated the Sharks in six games in the 2016 Stanley Cup Final.

On February 23, 2017, Daley underwent arthroscopic knee surgery following an injury during a game against the Carolina Hurricanes on February 21. Daley was expected to miss six weeks of play. He returned to the ice to play against the New Jersey Devils on April 6. He won his second straight Stanley Cup on June 11, 2017 when the Pittsburgh Penguins defeated the Nashville Predators.

On July 1, 2017, Daley signed a three-year contract with the Detroit Red Wings worth $9.534 million. On December 23, 2018, Daley played in his 1,000th career NHL game, becoming the 330th player in league history to reach the milestone.

On June 8, 2020, Daley became an inaugural executive board member of the Hockey Diversity Alliance, whose goal is to address intolerance and racism in hockey.

After not playing ice hockey for more than a year and having accepted several executive roles in the sport, Daley signed with the Florida Everblades of the ECHL on January 6, 2022.

== Post-playing career ==
On October 26, 2020, Daley announced his retirement from professional hockey, and joined the Penguins' front office as a hockey operations advisor. He assisted in player evaluations at both the NHL and minor league level as well as on-ice player development, and on August 4, 2023 was promoted by Penguins President of hockey operations and general manager, Kyle Dubas as a special assistant. His role includes an increased focus on player personnel and development, as well as minor league operations.

In 2021, Daley was a member of an ownership group that purchased the Soo Thunderbirds of the Northern Ontario Junior Hockey League.

== Career statistics ==
=== Regular season and playoffs ===
			Regular season					Playoffs
Season	Team	League	GP	G	A	Pts	PIM	GP	G	A	Pts	PIM
1998–99	Vaughan Vipers	OPJHL	44	10	36	46	79	—	—	—	—	—
1999–00	Sault Ste. Marie Greyhounds	OHL	54	16	30	46	77	15	3	7	10	12
2000–01	Sault Ste. Marie Greyhounds	OHL	58	14	27	41	105	—	—	—	—	—
2001–02	Sault Ste. Marie Greyhounds	OHL	47	9	39	48	38	6	2	2	4	4
2002–03	Sault Ste. Marie Greyhounds	OHL	57	20	33	53	128	1	0	0	0	2
2003–04	Utah Grizzlies	AHL	40	8	6	14	76	—	—	—	—	—
2003–04	Dallas Stars	NHL	27	1	5	6	14	1	0	0	0	0
2004–05	Hamilton Bulldogs	AHL	78	7	27	34	109	4	0	1	1	2
2005–06	Dallas Stars	NHL	81	3	11	14	87	3	0	0	0	0
2006–07	Dallas Stars	NHL	74	4	8	12	63	7	1	0	1	4
2007–08	Dallas Stars	NHL	82	5	19	24	85	18	1	0	1	20
2008–09	Dallas Stars	NHL	75	7	18	25	73	—	—	—	—	—
2009–10	Dallas Stars	NHL	77	6	16	22	25	—	—	—	—	—
2010–11	Dallas Stars	NHL	82	8	19	27	34	—	—	—	—	—
2011–12	Dallas Stars	NHL	79	4	21	25	42	—	—	—	—	—
2012–13	Dallas Stars	NHL	44	4	9	13	14	—	—	—	—	—
2013–14	Dallas Stars	NHL	67	9	16	25	38	6	2	3	5	16
2014–15	Dallas Stars	NHL	68	16	22	38	34	—	—	—	—	—
2015–16	Chicago Blackhawks	NHL	29	0	6	6	8	—	—	—	—	—
2015–16	Pittsburgh Penguins	NHL	53	6	16	22	26	15	1	5	6	10
2016–17	Pittsburgh Penguins	NHL	56	5	14	19	37	21	1	4	5	24
2017–18	Detroit Red Wings	NHL	77	9	7	16	36	—	—	—	—	—
2018–19	Detroit Red Wings	NHL	44	2	6	8	12	—	—	—	—	—
2019–20	Detroit Red Wings	NHL	43	0	7	7	20	—	—	—	—	—
2021–22	Florida Everblades	ECHL	2	0	0	0	0	—	—	—	—	—
NHL totals			1,058	89	220	309	648	71	6	12	18	74

=== International ===
Year	Team	Event	Result	GP	G	A	Pts	PIM
2000	Canada Ontario	U17	2nd place, silver medalist(s)	6	5	3	8	0
2000	Canada	U18	1st place, gold medalist(s)	3	0	1	1	0
2006	Canada	WC	4th	7	0	1	1	10
Junior totals				9	5	4	9	0
Senior totals				7	0	1	1	10

== Awards and honours ==
Awards	Year
NHL
Stanley Cup champion	2016, 2017

== See also ==
- Black players in ice hockey
