= 2017 Stanley Cup Final =

2017 ice hockey championship series

	1	2	3	4	5	6	Total
Nashville Predators	3	1	5	4	0	0	2
Pittsburgh Penguins	5	4	1	1	6	2	4
- Location(s): Nashville: Bridgestone Arena (3, 4, 6); Pittsburgh: PPG Paints Arena (1, 2, 5)
- Coaches: Nashville: Peter Laviolette; Pittsburgh: Mike Sullivan
- Captains: Nashville: Mike Fisher; Pittsburgh: Sidney Crosby
- National anthems: Nashville: Martina McBride (3), Dierks Bentley (4), Faith Hill (6); Pittsburgh: Jeff Jimerson
- Referees: Wes McCauley (1, 3, 5); Brad Meier (1, 3, 5); Dan O'Halloran (2, 4, 6); Kevin Pollock (2, 4, 6)
- Dates: May 29 – June 11, 2017
- MVP: Sidney Crosby (Penguins)
- Series-winning goal: Patric Hornqvist (18:25, third)
- Hall of Famers: Predators: Pekka Rinne (2026)
- Networks: Canada: (English): CBC/Sportsnet (French): TVA Sports; United States: (English): NBC (1, 4–6), NBCSN (2–3)
- Announcers: (CBC/SN) Jim Hughson and Craig Simpson (TVA) Felix Seguin and Patrick Lalime (NBC/NBCSN) Mike Emrick, Eddie Olczyk, and Pierre McGuire (NHL International) Steve Mears and Kevin Weekes (NBC Sports Radio & NHL Radio) Kenny Albert, Joe Micheletti, and Ray Ferraro

The 2017 Stanley Cup Final was the championship series of the National Hockey League's (NHL) 2016–17 season, and the culmination of the 2017 Stanley Cup playoffs. The Eastern Conference champion and defending Stanley Cup champion Pittsburgh Penguins defeated the Western Conference champion Nashville Predators, four games to two to repeat as Stanley Cup champions. Penguins captain Sidney Crosby was awarded the Conn Smythe Trophy as the most valuable player of the playoffs for the second consecutive year. The Penguins won the Stanley Cup in their opponent's rink for the fifth time.

During the regular season, the Penguins finished second in the league with 111 points, which gave them home ice advantage in the series. The series began on May 29 and concluded on June 11. The Penguins made their second consecutive Finals appearance, marking the third time in their history they had done this, following their appearances in 1991–1992 and 2008–2009. This was the first time since 2009, a rematch between the Penguins and Detroit Red Wings, that any team appeared in consecutive Finals. The Penguins also became the first team since the Red Wings (in 1997 and 1998) to win the Stanley Cup in consecutive years and the first to do so since the introduction of the salary cap. They also became the fifth franchise to accomplish this feat more than once.

This marked the second consecutive season in which a Western Conference team made their first appearance in the Finals; the San Jose Sharks made their Finals debut the year prior. This was the first time in NHL history that two United States–born head coaches faced off against each other in the Stanley Cup Final.

The Penguins won the first two games of the series despite being massively outshot by the Predators in both games. Nashville tied the series at two with a pair of convincing wins at home. However, Penguins goaltender Matt Murray shut out the Predators for the remainder of the series. Penguins coach Mike Sullivan became the third coach in NHL history to win the Stanley Cup in his first two seasons as a coach with his team, joining Pete Green of the original Ottawa Senators (in 1920 and 1921) and Toe Blake of the Montreal Canadiens (in 1956 and 1957). This was the first Finals since 1983 in which no game was decided by one goal, and the second Finals in three years to have none of its games reach overtime.

As of 2026, this is the most recent major professional sports championship won by a Pittsburgh-based team.

== Paths to the Finals ==
=== Pittsburgh Penguins ===
Bryan Rust of the Pittsburgh Penguins scores the series-winning goal against the Washington Capitals in Game 7 of the Eastern Conference Second Round

This was Pittsburgh's second consecutive Finals appearance, and sixth overall. The Penguins did not make any major transactions during the offseason, instead of signing head coach Mike Sullivan to a three-year extension. At the deadline, Pittsburgh acquired defensemen Ron Hainsey and Mark Streit via trade, which proved helpful for depth when star Kris Letang suffered a season-ending injury just weeks before the playoffs started.

Pittsburgh finished with 111 points (50–21–11) during the regular season to finish second in the Metropolitan Division and second overall among playoff teams. Center and team captain Sidney Crosby led the Penguins with 89 points, which ranked second in the league, and won the Rocket Richard Trophy with 44 goals. Phil Kessel led the team in assists with 47.

In the playoffs, the Penguins defeated the Columbus Blue Jackets in five games, eliminated the back-to-back Presidents' Trophy-winning Washington Capitals for a second consecutive year, this time in seven games, and edged the Ottawa Senators in seven games in the Eastern NHL Conference Finals after Chris Kunitz scored in double overtime of game seven.

=== Nashville Predators ===
This was Nashville's first Stanley Cup Final appearance in its 19-year history. They were also the first major professional sports team from Tennessee to play for a championship since the also Nashville-based Tennessee Titans made Super Bowl XXXIV in 2000.

During the offseason, Nashville traded defenceman and long-time team captain Shea Weber to Montreal for defenceman P. K. Subban, and during the regular season, traded for forwards Cody McLeod and Vernon Fiddler. The Predators also re-signed forward Filip Forsberg during the offseason.

Nashville finished with 94 points (41–29–12) during the regular season, finishing as the eighth seed and second wild card team in the Western Conference, and the 16th overall. Forsberg and Viktor Arvidsson tied for the team lead in regular-season goal-scoring with 31 each. Ryan Johansen led the team in assists with 47. Arvidsson and Johansen tied for the team lead in points with 61.

The Predators started the playoffs by upsetting the top-seeded Chicago Blackhawks in a sweep, becoming the second team in NHL history to be the lowest seed in their conference to sweep the top seeded team in the opening round (1993 St. Louis Blues). They followed that up by eliminating the St. Louis Blues and Anaheim Ducks, both in six games. Kevin Fiala and Johansen sustained serious leg injuries in the second and third rounds respectively, and both missed the remainder of the playoffs. The Predators became the third team to be the lowest seed in their conference in NHL history to reach the Stanley Cup Final, joining the 2006 Edmonton Oilers and the 2012 Los Angeles Kings. The Predators were also the third different franchise that head coach Peter Laviolette led to the Stanley Cup Final. He won the Cup with the Carolina Hurricanes in 2006, and also took the Philadelphia Flyers to the 2010 Stanley Cup Final.

== Game summaries ==
Number in parentheses represents the player's total in goals or assists to that point of the entire four rounds of the playoffs

=== Game one ===
May 29	Nashville Predators	3–5	Pittsburgh Penguins	PPG Paints Arena	Recap

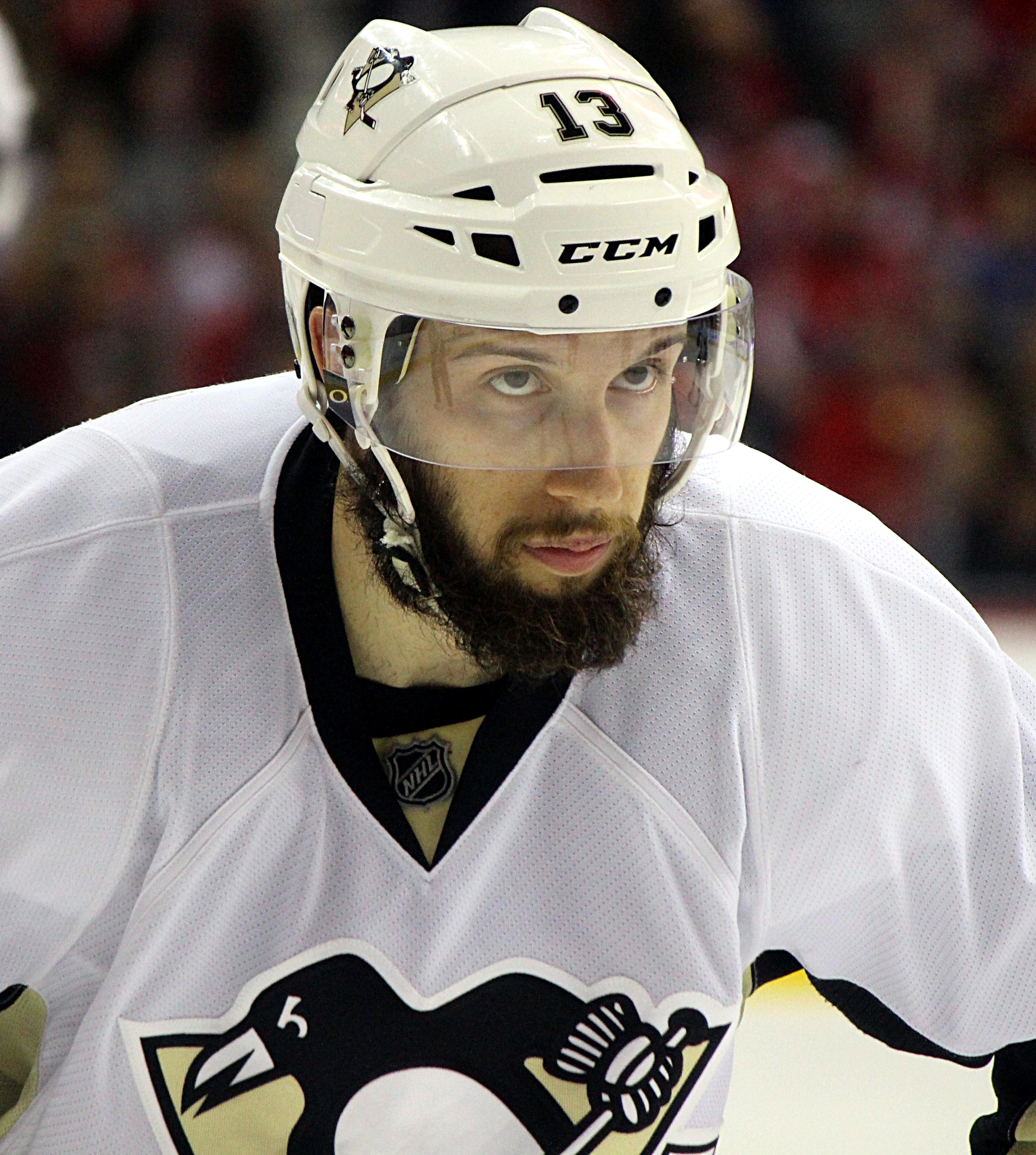
Nick Bonino scored two goals in Game 1.

Late in the first period, penalties from Nashville forwards Calle Jarnkrok and James Neal gave Pittsburgh a full two-minute 5-on-3 power play, and Evgeni Malkin scored to make it 1–0. Just 1:15 later, Conor Sheary scored into an open net after a cross-ice pass from Chris Kunitz caught Nashville's defence off guard. In the final seconds of the period, a centring pass from Nick Bonino deflected off Mattias Ekholm and into the net to give Pittsburgh a 3–0 lead. Following Bonino's goal, the Penguins went 37 consecutive minutes without a shot on goal, including the entire second period. The Predators used power-play goals from Ryan Ellis and Colton Sissons to make it 3–2, and Frederick Gaudreau scored immediately following a Penguins power play to tie the game midway through the third. Soon afterwards, Pittsburgh's first shot since the first period resulted in a Jake Guentzel goal to give Pittsburgh the lead again. Bonino scored again into an empty net to clinch the victory for Pittsburgh.

Scoring summary
Period	Team	Goal	Assist(s)	Time	Score
1st	PIT	Evgeni Malkin (8) – pp	Trevor Daley (3) and Sidney Crosby (14)	15:32	1–0 PIT
1st	PIT	Conor Sheary (1)	Chris Kunitz (4) and Sidney Crosby (15)	16:37	2–0 PIT
1st	PIT	Nick Bonino (3)	Brian Dumoulin (3)	19:43	3–0 PIT
2nd	NSH	Ryan Ellis (5) – pp	P. K. Subban (9) and Mike Fisher (1)	08:21	3–1 PIT
3rd	NSH	Colton Sissons (6) – pp	Roman Josi (6) and Calle Jarnkrok (3)	10:06	3–2 PIT
3rd	NSH	Frederick Gaudreau (1)	Austin Watson (3) and Mike Fisher (2)	13:29	3–3
3rd	PIT	Jake Guentzel (10)	Matt Cullen (6) and Justin Schultz (8)	16:43	4–3 PIT
3rd	PIT	Nick Bonino (4) – en	Chris Kunitz (5)	18:58	5–3 PIT
Penalty summary
Period	Team	Player	Penalty	Time	PIM
1st	NSH	Calle Jarnkrok	Interference	13:50	2:00
1st	NSH	James Neal	Cross-checking	13:50	2:00
2nd	PIT	Olli Maatta	Interference	03:43	2:00
2nd	PIT	Ian Cole	Roughing	06:39	2:00
3rd	PIT	Evgeni Malkin	Slashing	09:36	2:00
3rd	NSH	P. K. Subban	Delay of game (puck over glass)	11:24	2:00

Shots by period
Team	1	2	3	Total
Nashville	11	9	6	26
Pittsburgh	8	0	4	12

=== Game two ===
May 31	Nashville Predators	1–4	Pittsburgh Penguins	PPG Paints Arena	Recap

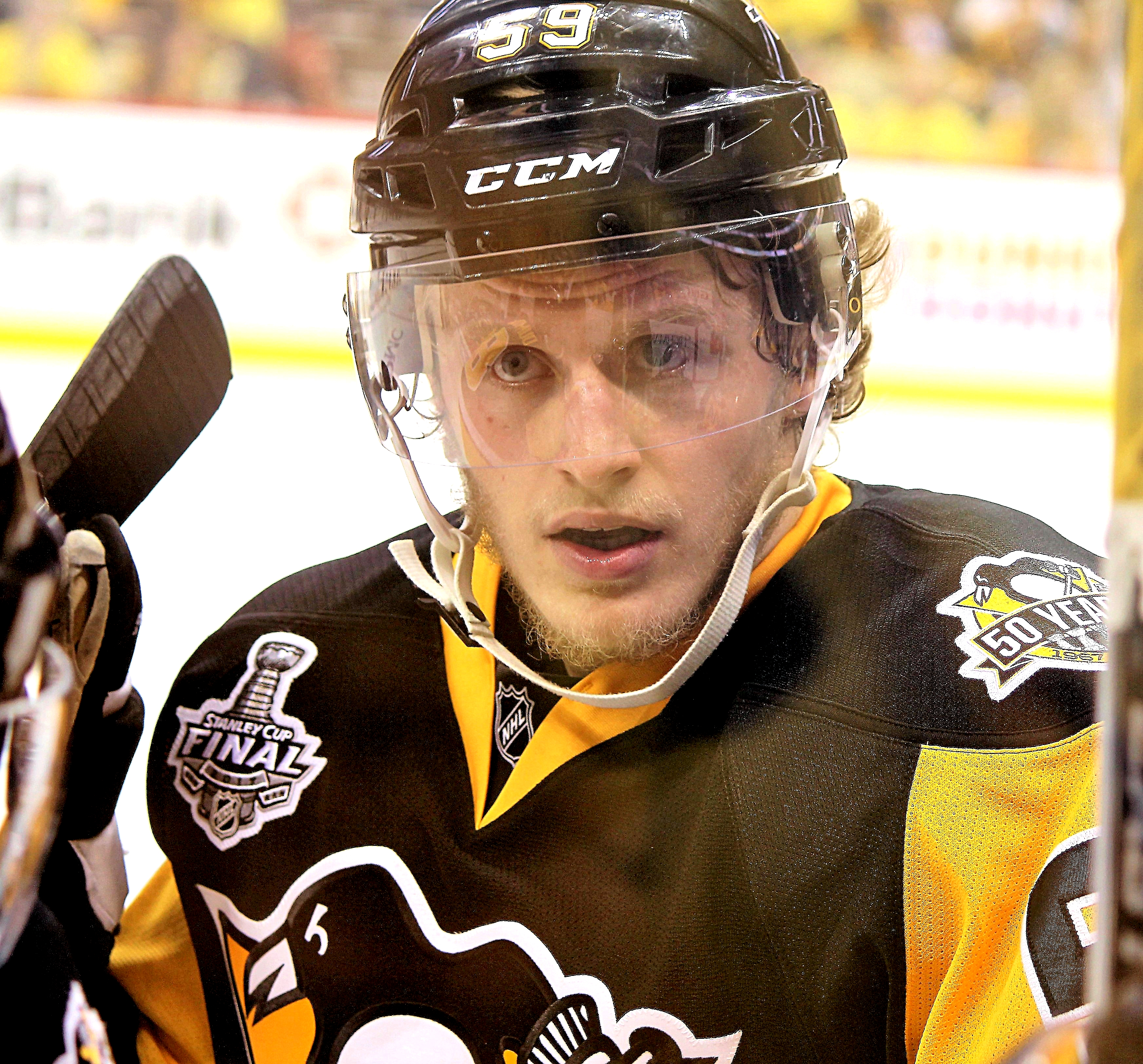
Jake Guentzel scored twice, including his second-consecutive game-winning goal, in Game 2.

Midway through the first, the Predators took their first-ever lead in a Stanley Cup Final game when Pontus Aberg scored around Olli Maatta. The Penguins tied it late in the period when a Guentzel tip sneaked past Pekka Rinne. After a scoreless second period in which the Predators took twice as many shots as the Penguins, Pittsburgh came out firing in the third, scoring three goals in 3:18. The first was Guentzel's twelfth of the playoffs, making him the first rookie since Dino Ciccarelli in 1981 to score twelve times in a single postseason. The next two goals came 15 seconds apart and prompted Predators head coach Peter Laviolette to replace Rinne with backup Juuse Saros. Despite Nashville heavily outshooting Pittsburgh, goaltender Matt Murray stood his ground, making 37 saves. Nashville never cut into the deficit as Pittsburgh won the game by 4–1.

Scoring summary
Period	Team	Goal	Assist(s)	Time	Score
1st	NSH	Pontus Aberg (2)	Viktor Arvidsson (9) and Mike Fisher (3)	12:57	1–0 NSH
1st	PIT	Jake Guentzel (11)	Conor Sheary (5) and Chris Kunitz (6)	16:36	1–1
2nd	None				
3rd	PIT	Jake Guentzel (12)	Bryan Rust (2) and Ron Hainsey (5)	00:10	2–1 PIT
3rd	PIT	Scott Wilson (3)	Phil Kessel (13) and Matt Cullen (7)	03:13	3–1 PIT
3rd	PIT	Evgeni Malkin (9)	Chris Kunitz (7) and Ian Cole (8)	03:28	4–1 PIT
Penalty summary
Period	Team	Player	Penalty	Time	PIM
1st	NSH	Craig Smith	Cross-checking	02:04	2:00
1st	PIT	Chris Kunitz	Cross-checking	09:36	2:00
1st	PIT	Evgeni Malkin	Hooking	09:36	2:00
1st	NSH	Mike Fisher	Interference	10:34	2:00
1st	NSH	Roman Josi	Cross-checking	14:32	2:00
2nd	NSH	Austin Watson	Interference	11:48	2:00
2nd	NSH	Cody McLeod	High-sticking	17:25	2:00
3rd	NSH	Pontus Aberg	Slashing	04:51	2:00
3rd	PIT	Sidney Crosby	Interference	09:20	2:00
3rd	PIT	Evgeni Malkin	Fighting – major	12:14	5:00
3rd	PIT	Evgeni Malkin (served by Scott Wilson)	Roughing	12:14	2:00
3rd	NSH	P. K. Subban	Fighting – major	12:14	5:00
3rd	NSH	Cody McLeod	Interference	18:01	2:00
3rd	PIT	Chris Kunitz	Slashing	18:29	2:00

Shots by period
Team	1	2	3	Total
Nashville	18	14	6	38
Pittsburgh	12	7	8	27

=== Game three ===
June 3	Pittsburgh Penguins	1–5	Nashville Predators	Bridgestone Arena	Recap

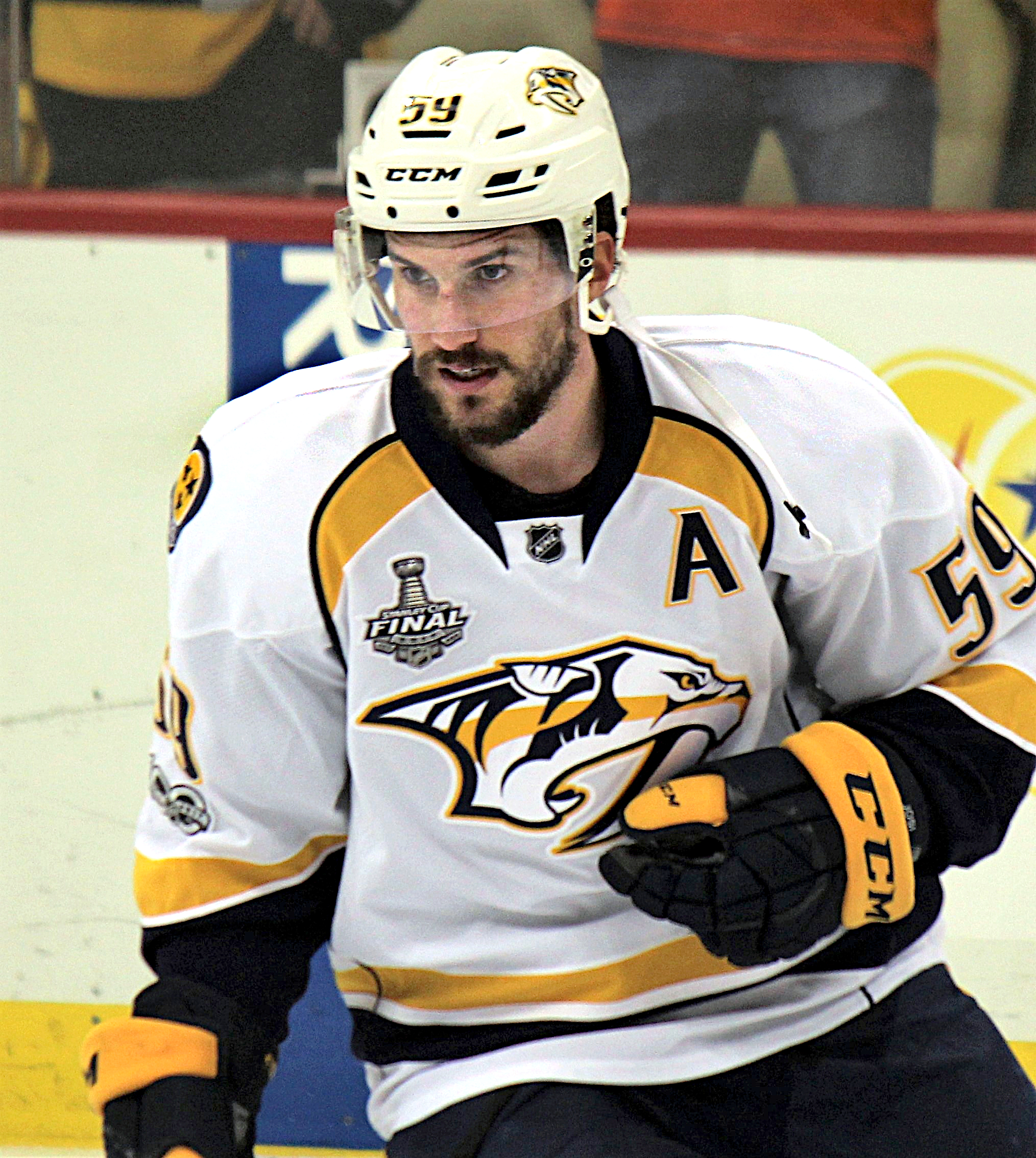
Roman Josi scored a goal and three points in Game 3.

Jake Guentzel came within one goal of Dino Ciccarelli's rookie playoff record when a shot 2:46 into the game got past Pekka Rinne. In the second period, Roman Josi and Frederick Gaudreau scored only 42 seconds apart to quickly give Nashville the lead. Neal scored with 23 seconds left in the second to give the Predators a two-goal lead. In the third period, a breakaway by Craig Smith and a goal by Ekholm provided insurance in a 5–1 victory for Nashville. Pekka Rinne made 27 saves to record his first career victory over Pittsburgh, as he had a previously had a career record of 0-7-2 against them. Near the end of the game, several misconducts were assessed after a cross-checking by Phil Kessel drew a crowd and fights broke out.

Scoring summary
Period	Team	Goal	Assist(s)	Time	Score
1st	PIT	Jake Guentzel (13)	Ian Cole (9) and Sidney Crosby (16)	02:46	1–0 PIT
2nd	NSH	Roman Josi (6) – pp	Calle Jarnkrok and Mattias Ekholm (9)	05:51	1–1
2nd	NSH	Frederick Gaudreau (2)	Austin Watson (4) and Roman Josi (7)	06:33	2–1 NSH
2nd	NSH	James Neal (6)	Viktor Arvidsson (10) and Roman Josi (8)	19:37	3–1 NSH
3rd	NSH	Craig Smith (1)	Unassisted	04:54	4–1 NSH
3rd	NSH	Mattias Ekholm (1) – pp	Calle Jarnkrok (5) and Colton Sissons (6)	13:10	5–1 NSH
Penalty summary
Period	Team	Player	Penalty	Time	PIM
1st	NSH	P. K. Subban	Holding	04:50	2:00
1st	NSH	Bench (served by James Neal)	Too many men on the ice	12:44	2:00
2nd	PIT	Justin Schultz	Holding	04:13	2:00
2nd	NSH	Ryan Ellis	Boarding	16:37	2:00
3rd	PIT	Carl Hagelin	Roughing	10:42	2:00
3rd	NSH	Mattias Ekholm	Roughing	10:42	2:00
3rd	PIT	Sidney Crosby	Boarding	12:43	2:00
3rd	PIT	Evgeni Malkin	Cross-checking	12:43	2:00
3rd	NSH	Filip Forsberg	Cross-checking	12:43	2:00
3rd	PIT	Trevor Daley	Holding	15:24	2:00
3rd	NSH	Viktor Arvidsson	Holding	15:24	2:00
3rd	NSH	James Neal	Unsportsmanlike conduct	15:24	2:00
3rd	PIT	Ian Cole	Roughing	15:24	2:00
3rd	PIT	Patric Hornqvist	Misconduct	15:38	10:00
3rd	NSH	Mattias Ekholm	Misconduct	15:38	10:00
3rd	PIT	Phil Kessel	Cross-checking	17:01	2:00
3rd	PIT	Chris Kunitz	Misconduct	17:01	10:00
3rd	NSH	Austin Watson	Misconduct	17:01	10:00
3rd	PIT	Matt Cullen	Misconduct	17:01	10:00

Shots by period
Team	1	2	3	Total
Pittsburgh	6	13	9	28
Nashville	12	16	5	33

=== Game four ===
June 5	Pittsburgh Penguins	1–4	Nashville Predators	Bridgestone Arena	Recap

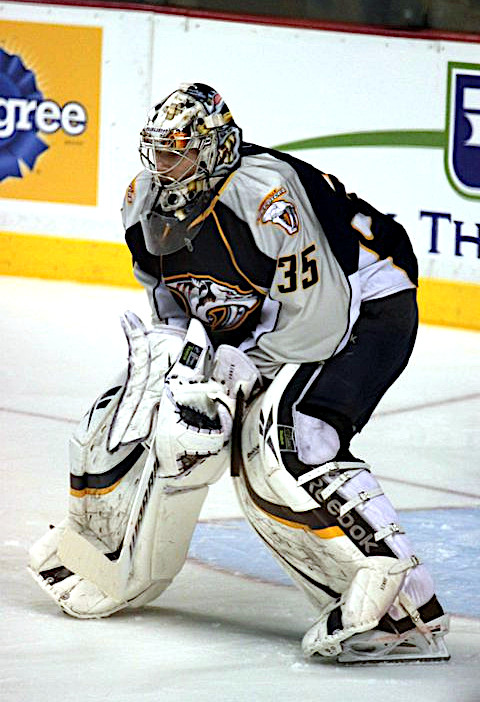
Pekka Rinne saved 23 of 24 shots faced in Game 4.

Calle Jarnkrok gave Nashville an early lead, but a breakaway goal by Sidney Crosby tied the score at one. In the second period, after a Penguins breakaway was stopped by Rinne, Gaudreau's wrap-around shot appeared to be stopped by Matt Murray, but video review showed the puck sneak under Murray's paddle and across the goal line before Murray sent it back out. A breakaway goal by Viktor Arvidsson gave the Predators their third goal of the game. Rinne would stop all nine shots faced in the third period and an empty-net goal by Filip Forsberg gave Nashville a 4–1 win and tied the series 2–2.

Scoring summary
Period	Team	Goal	Assist(s)	Time	Score
1st	NSH	Calle Jarnkrok (2)	Craig Smith (2) and Austin Watson (5)	14:51	1–0 NSH
1st	PIT	Sidney Crosby (8)	Brian Dumoulin (4)	15:57	1–1
2nd	NSH	Frederick Gaudreau (3)	Ryan Ellis (8) and Harry Zolnierczyk (2)	03:45	2–1 NSH
2nd	NSH	Viktor Arvidsson (3)	Mike Fisher (4) and James Neal (3)	13:08	3–1 NSH
3rd	NSH	Filip Forsberg (9) – en	Unassisted	16:37	4–1 NSH
Penalty summary
Period	Team	Player	Penalty	Time	PIM
1st	PIT	Patric Hornqvist	Tripping	07:15	2:00
1st	NSH	James Neal	Interference	19:18	2:00
2nd	PIT	Ron Hainsey	High-sticking	06:15	2:00
3rd	NSH	Mattias Ekholm	Roughing	18:21	2:00
3rd	PIT	Josh Archibald	Roughing	18:21	2:00
3rd	NSH	Mattias Ekholm	Slashing	18:21	2:00
3rd	NSH	Ryan Ellis	Cross-checking	19:35	2:00

Shots by period
Team	1	2	3	Total
Pittsburgh	6	8	10	24
Nashville	7	8	11	26

=== Game five ===
June 8	Nashville Predators	0–6	Pittsburgh Penguins	PPG Paints Arena	Recap

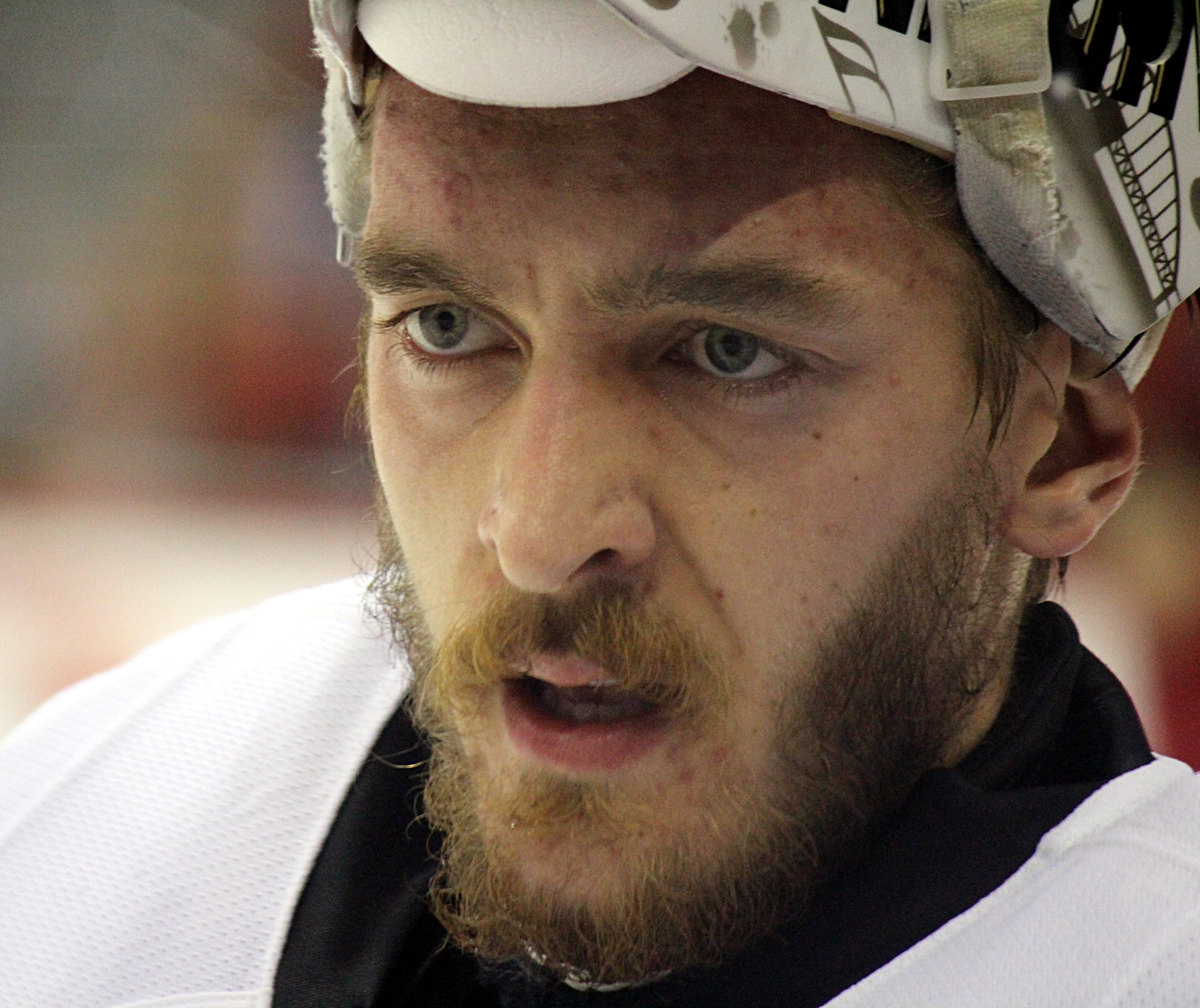
Matt Murray registered a 24-save shutout, his first of back-to-back shutouts, in Game 5.

Justin Schultz scored for Pittsburgh early in the first period on the power play. Two more goals from the Penguins caused Nashville to again replace Rinne with Saros in net to start the second period. Pittsburgh scored three more times in the second, the first from Conor Sheary. Guentzel assisted on Sheary's goal, tying Dino Ciccarelli's record for most points by a rookie in a single postseason (21). Kessel and Ron Hainsey scored the last of Pittsburgh's six goals; Kessel and Crosby both ended the game with three points. Neither team scored in the third period, and Matt Murray stopped all 24 shots he faced to record his second shutout of the postseason. Murray also became the first rookie since Cam Ward in 2006 to record a shutout in the Stanley Cup Final. During the third period, 20 penalties were assessed, the most in one period since the third game of the 2011 Stanley Cup Final.

Scoring summary
Period	Team	Goal	Assist(s)	Time	Score
1st	PIT	Justin Schultz (4) – pp	Sidney Crosby (17) and Patric Hornqvist (4)	01:31	1–0 PIT
1st	PIT	Bryan Rust (7)	Chris Kunitz (8) and Trevor Daley (4)	06:43	2–0 PIT
1st	PIT	Evgeni Malkin (10)	Phil Kessel (14) and Ron Hainsey (6)	19:49	3–0 PIT
2nd	PIT	Conor Sheary (2)	Sidney Crosby (18) and Jake Guentzel (8)	01:19	4–0 PIT
2nd	PIT	Phil Kessel (8)	Olli Maatta (6) and Sidney Crosby (19)	08:02	5–0 PIT
2nd	PIT	Ron Hainsey (2)	Evgeni Malkin (18) and Phil Kessel (15)	16:40	6–0 PIT
3rd	None				
Penalty summary
Period	Team	Player	Penalty	Time	PIM
1st	NSH	Ryan Ellis	Holding	00:50	2:00
1st	PIT	Bench (served by Scott Wilson)	Too many men on ice	10:06	2:00
1st	NSH	P. K. Subban	Holding	18:28	2:00
1st	PIT	Sidney Crosby	Holding	18:28	2:00
2nd	NSH	Filip Forsberg	Goaltender interference	13:02	2:00
3rd	PIT	Bryan Rust	Tripping	03:45	2:00
3rd	NSH	James Neal	Cross-checking	07:31	2:00
3rd	PIT	Evgeni Malkin	Roughing – double minor	11:32	4:00
3rd	NSH	P. K. Subban	Unsportsmanlike conduct	11:32	2:00
3rd	NSH	Roman Josi	Interference	11:32	2:00
3rd	PIT	Patric Hornqvist	Unsportsmanlike conduct	11:32	2:00
3rd	NSH	Roman Josi	Roughing – double minor	11:32	4:00
3rd	NSH	Viktor Arvidsson	Fighting – major	11:32	5:00
3rd	NSH	Viktor Arvidsson	Misconduct	11:32	10:00
3rd	PIT	Carl Hagelin	Misconduct	11:32	10:00
3rd	PIT	Carl Hagelin	Fighting – major	11:32	5:00
3rd	NSH	Austin Watson	Charging	12:40	2:00
3rd	NSH	Colton Sissons	Match penalty	19:26	10:00
3rd	NSH	Yannick Weber	Fighting – major	19:26	5:00
3rd	NSH	Austin Watson	Misconduct	19:26	10:00
3rd	PIT	Trevor Daley	Misconduct	19:26	10:00
3rd	PIT	Chris Kunitz	Fighting – major	19:26	5:00

Shots by period
Team	1	2	3	Total
Nashville	9	6	9	24
Pittsburgh	9	10	5	24

=== Game six ===
June 11	Pittsburgh Penguins	2–0	Nashville Predators	Bridgestone Arena	Recap

External videos
- Game 6 Full replay (NHL International's feed) on the NHL's official YouTube channel

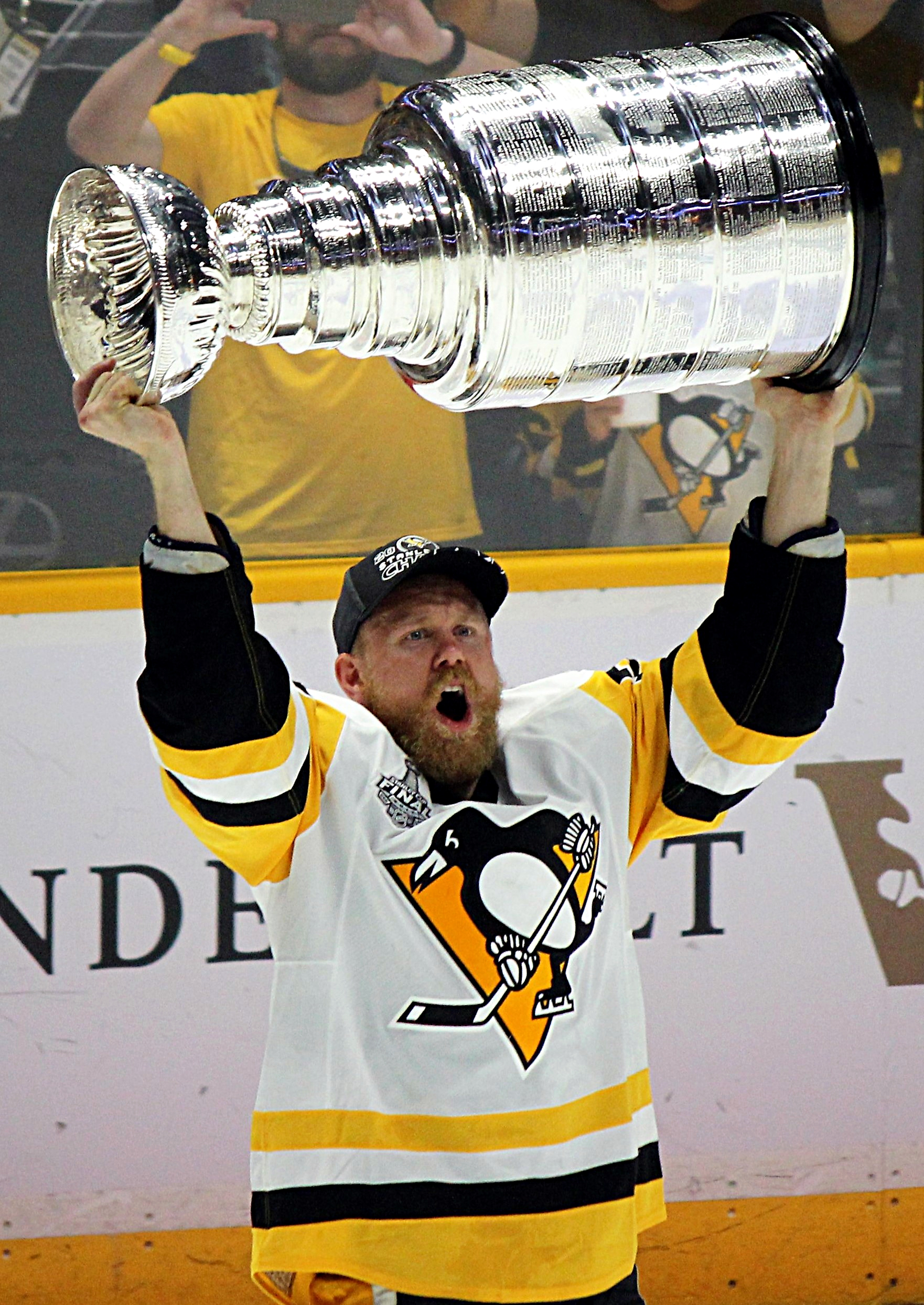
Patric Hornqvist scored the Stanley Cup-clinching goal in Game 6.

Although game six remained scoreless through two periods, a quick whistle prevented a Predators' scoring chance that almost certainly would have resulted in a goal. Referee Kevin Pollock thought Matt Murray had covered a Filip Forsberg shot, but the puck was, in fact, loose in the goal crease, when Colton Sissons tapped it in. The game remained scoreless until the final two minutes of the third period when former Predator Patric Hornqvist scored with 1:35 left in the game. Nashville challenged for goaltender interference, but the on-ice ruling was upheld. Carl Hagelin added an empty net goal with 15 seconds remaining whilst the Penguins would win their second consecutive Stanley Cup becoming the first since the Red Wings did it against the Flyers and the Capitals in 1997 and 1998 respectively. Coach Mike Sullivan became the first American-born coach to win two Stanley Cups. Matt Murray made 27 saves in net for Pittsburgh, making him the first goaltender since Terry Sawchuk in 1952 to close out a Stanley Cup Final with back-to-back shutouts. Sidney Crosby was awarded the Conn Smythe Trophy as MVP of the playoffs for the second consecutive season, becoming the first player since Mario Lemieux in 1991 and 1992 to be awarded the trophy in back-to-back years.

Scoring summary
Period	Team	Goal	Assist(s)	Time	Score
1st	None				
2nd	None				
3rd
3rd	PIT	Patric Hornqvist (5)	Justin Schultz (2) and Chris Kunitz (6)	18:25	1–0 PIT
3rd	PIT	Carl Hagelin (2) – en	Brian Dumoulin (5)	19:46	2–0 PIT
Penalty summary
Period	Team	Player	Penalty	Time	PIM
1st	PIT	Ian Cole	Interference	13:14	2:00
2nd	PIT	Conor Sheary	Tripping	04:38	2:00
3rd	PIT	Olli Maatta	Tripping	07:19	2:00
3rd	PIT	Trevor Daley	Roughing	08:47	2:00

Shots by period
Team	1	2	3	Total
Pittsburgh	9	13	7	29
Nashville	8	11	8	27

== Team rosters ==
=== Nashville Predators ===
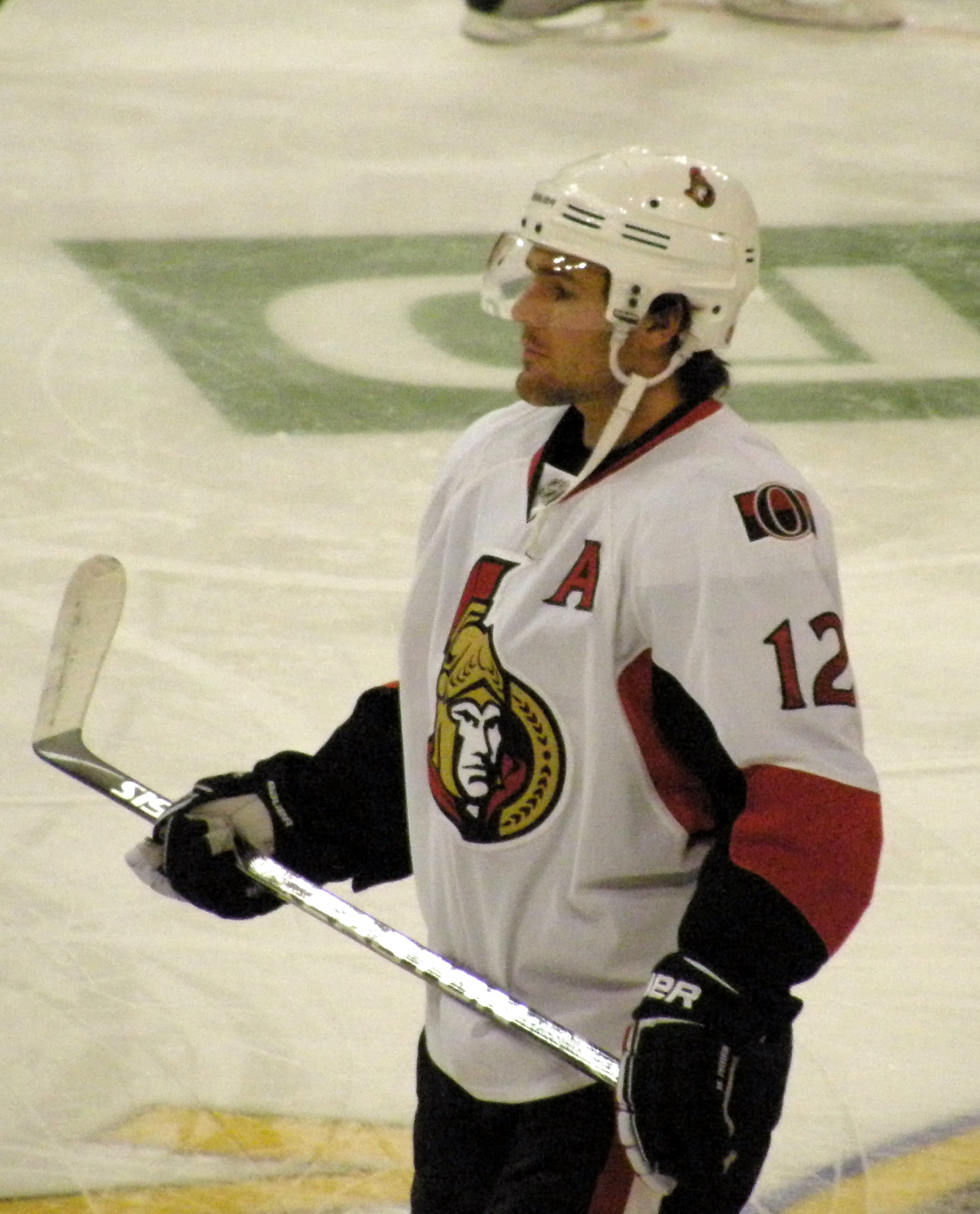
Mike Fisher (pictured with Ottawa) captained the Predators to their first Stanley Cup Final appearance in franchise history

#	Nat	Player	Position	Hand	Age	Acquired	Place of birth	Finals appearance
46	(Sweden)	Pontus Aberg	LW	R	23	2012	Stockholm, Sweden	first
38	(Sweden)	Viktor Arvidsson	LW	R	24	2014	Skellefteå, Sweden	first
14	(Sweden)	Mattias Ekholm	D	L	27	2009	Borlänge, Sweden	first
4	(Canada)	Ryan Ellis – A	D	R	26	2009	Hamilton, Ontario	first
83	(Canada)	Vernon Fiddler	C	L	37	2017	Edmonton, Alberta	first
12	(Canada)	Mike Fisher – C	C	R	36	2011	Peterborough, Ontario	second (2007)
9	(Sweden)	Filip Forsberg	LW	R	22	2013	Östervåla, Sweden	first
32	(Canada)	Frederick Gaudreau	C	R	24	2016	Bromont, Quebec	first
52	(Canada)	Matt Irwin	D	L	29	2016	Victoria, British Columbia	first
19	(Sweden)	Calle Jarnkrok	C	R	25	2014	Gävle, Sweden	first
59	(Switzerland)	Roman Josi – A	D	L	26	2008	Bern, Switzerland	first
55	(Canada)	Cody McLeod	LW	L	32	2017	Binscarth, Manitoba	first
18	(Canada)	James Neal – A	RW	L	29	2015	Whitby, Ontario	first
11	(Canada)	P. A. Parenteau	RW	R	34	2017	Hull, Quebec	first
35	(Finland)	Pekka Rinne	G	L	34	2004	Kempele, Finland	first
20	(Finland)	Miikka Salomaki	RW	L	24	2011	Raahe, Finland	first
74	(Finland)	Juuse Saros	G	L	22	2013	Forssa, Finland	first
10	(Canada)	Colton Sissons	C	R	23	2012	North Vancouver, British Columbia	first
15	(United States)	Craig Smith	RW	R	27	2009	Madison, Wisconsin	first
76	(Canada)	P. K. Subban	D	R	28	2016	Toronto, Ontario	first
51	(United States)	Austin Watson	W/C	R	25	2010	Ann Arbor, Michigan	first
7	(Switzerland)	Yannick Weber	D	R	28	2016	Morges, Switzerland	first
33	(United States)	Colin Wilson	LW	L	27	2008	Greenwich, Connecticut	first
26	(Canada)	Harry Zolnierczyk	LW	L	29	2016	Toronto, Ontario	first

=== Pittsburgh Penguins ===
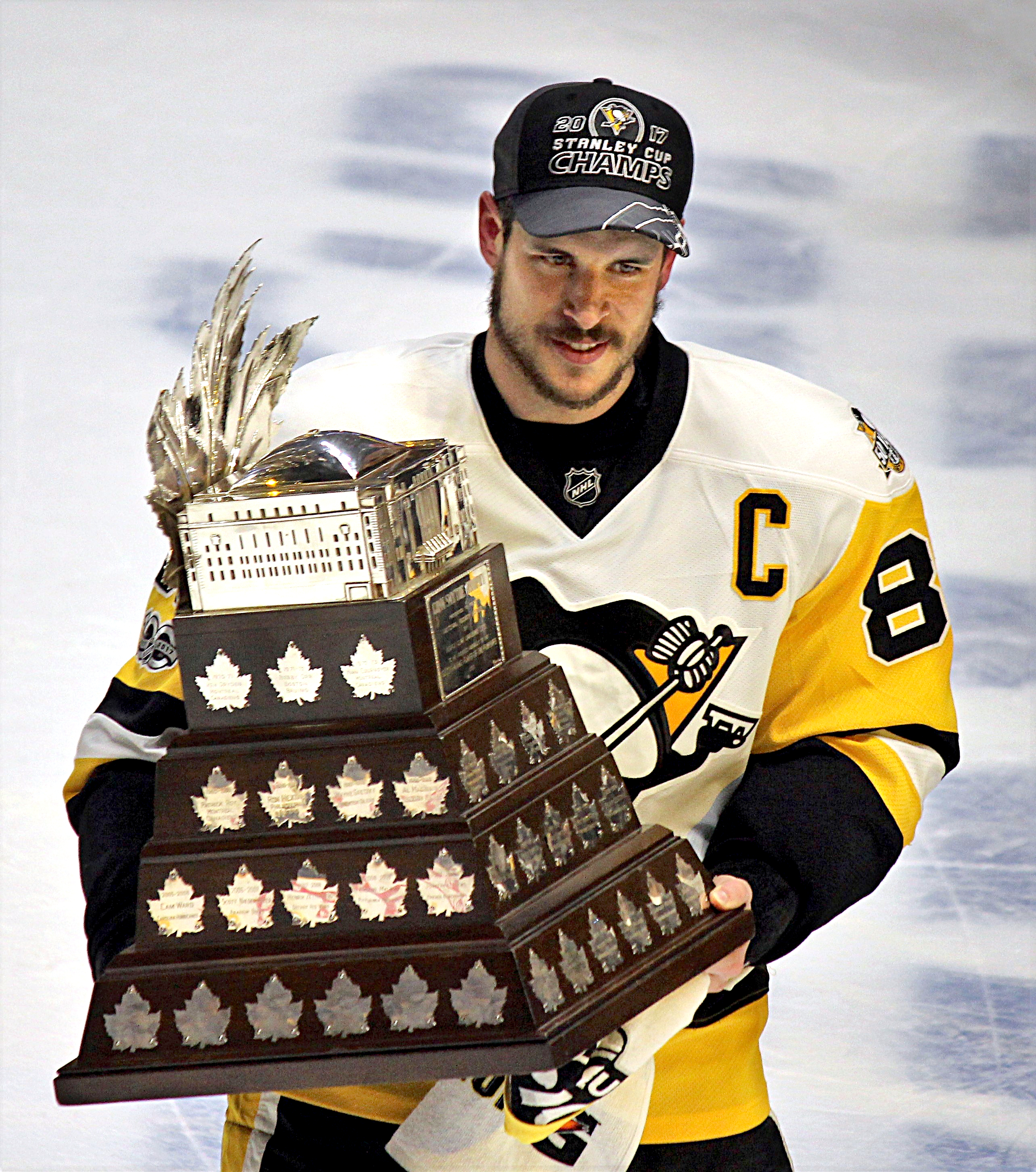
Sidney Crosby captained the Penguins to their second-consecutive Stanley Cup championship and fourth Finals appearance in ten seasons

#	Nat	Player	Position	Hand	Age	Acquired	Place of birth	Finals appearance
45	(United States)	Josh Archibald	RW	R	24	2011	Regina, Saskatchewan	first
13	(United States)	Nick Bonino	C	L	29	2015	Hartford, Connecticut	second (2016)
28	(United States)	Ian Cole	D	L	28	2015	Ann Arbor, Michigan	second (2016)
87	(Canada)	Sidney Crosby – C	C	L	29	2005	Cole Harbour, Nova Scotia	fourth (2008, 2009, 2016)
7	(United States)	Matt Cullen	C	L	40	2015	Virginia, Minnesota	third (2006, 2016)
6	(Canada)	Trevor Daley	D	L	33	2015	Toronto, Ontario	second (2016)
8	(United States)	Brian Dumoulin	D	L	25	2012	Biddeford, Maine	second (2016)
29	(Canada)	Marc-Andre Fleury	G	L	32	2003	Sorel-Tracy, Quebec	fourth (did not play; 2008, 2009, 2016)
59	(United States)	Jake Guentzel	C/LW	L	22	2013	Omaha, Nebraska	first
62	(Sweden)	Carl Hagelin	LW	L	28	2016	Södertälje, Sweden	third (2014, 2016)
65	(United States)	Ron Hainsey	D	L	36	2017	Bolton, Connecticut	first
72	(Sweden)	Patric Hornqvist	RW	R	30	2014	Sollentuna, Sweden	second (2016)
81	(United States)	Phil Kessel	RW	R	29	2015	Madison, Wisconsin	second (2016)
34	(Germany)	Tom Kuhnhackl	LW	L	25	2010	Landshut, Germany	second (2016)
14	(Canada)	Chris Kunitz – A	LW	L	37	2009	Regina, Saskatchewan	fourth (2007, 2009, 2016)
58	(Canada)	Kris Letang	D	R	30	2005	Montreal, Quebec	fourth (did not play; 2008, 2009, 2016)
3	(Finland)	Olli Maatta	D	L	22	2012	Jyväskylä, Finland	second (2016)
71	(Russia)	Evgeni Malkin – A	C	L	30	2004	Magnitogorsk, Soviet Union	fourth (2008, 2009, 2016)
30	(Canada)	Matt Murray	G	L	23	2012	Thunder Bay, Ontario	second (2016)
37	(Canada)	Carter Rowney	RW/C	R	28	2016	Sexsmith, Alberta	first
17	(United States)	Bryan Rust	RW	R	25	2010	Pontiac, Michigan	second (2016)
4	(Canada)	Justin Schultz	D	R	26	2016	Kelowna, British Columbia	second (2016)
43	(United States)	Conor Sheary	LW	L	24	2015	Melrose, Massachusetts	second (2016)
32	(Switzerland)	Mark Streit	D	L	39	2017	Bern, Switzerland	first (did not play)
23	(Canada)	Scott Wilson	LW	L	25	2011	Oakville, Ontario	first

== Stanley Cup engraving ==
The 2017 Stanley Cup was presented to Penguins captain Sidney Crosby by NHL Commissioner Gary Bettman following the Penguins 2–0 win over the Predators in game six

The following Penguins players and staff had their names engraved on the Stanley Cup

2016–17 Pittsburgh Penguins

=== Players ===
Centres

- 7 Matt Cullen
- 13 Nick Bonino
- 59 Jake Guentzel*
- 71 Evgeni Malkin (A)
- 87 Sidney Crosby (Captain)

Wingers

- 14 Chris Kunitz (A)
- 17 Bryan Rust
- 23 Scott Wilson
- 34 Tom Kuhnhackl
- 37 Carter Rowney*
- 43 Conor Sheary
- 45 Josh Archibald
- 62 Carl Hagelin
- 72 Patric Hornqvist
- 81 Phil Kessel

Defencemen

- 3 Olli Maatta
- 4 Justin Schultz
- 6 Trevor Daley
- 8 Brian Dumoulin
- 28 Ian Cole
- 32 Mark Streit ‡
- 58 Kris Letang †
- 65 Ron Hainsey

Goaltenders

- 29 Marc-Andre Fleury
- 30 Matt Murray
- * Played both centre and wing.
- † Did not play or dress in the Final.
- ‡ Exemption granted to engrave the name of a player who did not automatically qualify. (Note: Automatic qualification for a player's name to be engraved on the Stanley Cup: Playing in (for a goaltender, dressing for) at least one Stanley Cup Final game or at least half of regular season games for the Stanley Cup winning team.)

=== Coaching and administrative staff ===
- Mario Lemieux (Chairman/Co-Owner/Alt. Governor), Ronald Burkle (Co-Owner/Alt. Governor), William Kassling (Co-Owner/Alt. Governor)
- David Morehouse (President/Governor), Travis Williams (Chief Operating Officer/Alt. Governor), Jim Rutherford (Exe. Vice President/General Manager)
- Jason Botterill (Asst. General Manager), Bill Guerin (Asst. General Manager), Jason Karmanos (Vice President of Hockey Operations)
- Mark Recchi (Player Development Coach), Mike Sullivan (Head Coach), Rick Tocchet (Asst. Coach)
- Jacques Martin (Asst. Coach), Mike Bales (Goaltending Coach), Andy Saucier (Video Coach),
- Sergei Gonchar (Defense Coach), Dr. Dharmesh Vyas (Head Team Physician), Chris Stewart (Athletic Trainer)
- Curtis Bell (Asst. Athletic Trainer), Patrick Steidle (Asst. Athletic Trainer), Andy O'Brien (Director of Sport Science & Performance)
- Dana Heinze (Equipment Manager), J.C. Ihrig (Asst. Equipment Manager), Jon Taglianetti (Asst. Equipment Manager)
- Jim Britt (Director of Team Operations), Randy Sexton (Director of Amateur Scouting), Derek Clancey (Director of Pro Scouting)

=== Engraving notes ===
- #58 Kris Letang (D) – played in 41 regular season games, but none in the playoffs due to a herniated disk in his neck that required surgery. As he played in half of the regular season games with Pittsburgh, he automatically qualified to have his name engraved on the Stanley Cup.
- #32 Mark Streit (D) – played in 19 regular season games and 3 playoff games (all in the Eastern Conference Finals) for Pittsburgh, previously 49 regular season games for Philadelphia. As he did not automatically qualify, Pittsburgh successfully requested an exemption to engrave his name. Streit became the third Swiss player (and first non-goaltender Swiss player) to win the Stanley Cup.
- Mario Lemieux is the only one to have his name engraved on the Stanley Cup for their titles in 1991, 1992, 2009, 2016, and 2017.
- Sergei Gonchar (Defense Coach) was left off the Stanley Cup engraving of the 2016 title, but included on the 2017 title engraving.
- The Penguins fill the last spot on the bottom ring of the Stanley Cup. The top ring, featuring winners from 1954 to 1965, was removed after the Capitals were added in 2018.
- Matt Murray became the first goalie to win the Stanley Cup-clinching game as a Rookie 2 years in a row. In 2016 Murray only played 13 regular season games but started all 6 games of the Finals for Pittsburgh. So in 2017 he was still a rookie (having not played 25 regular season games in a season) when he started all 6 games of the Finals for Pittsburgh.
- Alex Trinca (Strength & Conditioning Coach) (on Cup in 2016) and Danny Kroll (Assistant Equipment Manager) (on Cup in 2009) were left off the 2017 Stanley Cup engraving, but included in the team picture.

=== Player notes ===
- Fourteen players were on the roster during the playoffs, but left off the Stanley Cup engraving due to not qualifying.
  - #2 Chad Ruhwedel (D) – played 34 regular-season games and 11 playoff games. (plus 27 games in the minors). Missed last 2 games of Conference and all 6 games of the finals due to a concussion.
  - #25 Tom Sestito (LW) – 13 regular season games and none in the playoffs
  - #24 Cameron Gaunce (D) – played 12 regular season games and none in the playoffs
  - #35 Tristan Jarry (G) – dressed for 11 playoff games while Matt Murray was injured (Jarry received his second Stanley Cup ring, despite only playing one NHL game) – name not engraved on Cup
  - #51 Derrick Pouliot (D) – played 11 regular season games and none in the playoffs
  - #40 Oskar Sundqvist (C) – played 10 regular season games and none in the playoffs
  - #5 David Warsofsky (D) – played 7 regular season games and none in the playoffs
  - #11 Kevin Porter (C) – played 7 regular season games and none in the playoffs
  - #20 Frank Corrado (D) – played 2 regular season games and none in the playoffs
  - #49 Dominik Simon (C) – played 2 regular season games and none in the playoffs
  - #39 Jean-Sébastien Dea (C) – played 1 regular season game and none in the playoffs
  - #19 Garrett Wilson (LW) – did not play in the regular season or playoffs
  - #31 Sean Maguire (G) – did not play in the regular season or playoffs
  - #41 Daniel Sprong (RW) – did not play in the regular season or playoffs

== Television and radio ==
In Canada, the series was broadcast by Sportsnet and simulcast by CBC Television in English, and TVA Sports in French. In the U.S., NBC broadcast most of the games; games two and three were aired by NBCSN. In the U.S., the games were seen by an average of 4.762 million viewers, an increase of 19% over the 2016 finals, and the highest-rated finals without an Original Six team. Despite competition from the 2017 Tony Awards broadcast and the return of ABC's Sunday-night game show block, game six achieved a total viewership of 7.086 million.

The NHL on Westwood One/NBC Sports Radio carried the games throughout the United States on radio and through online streaming, while the home calls of Nashville (WPRT-FM/Predators Radio Network) and Pittsburgh (WXDX-FM/Penguins Radio Network) was available both over the air in their home markets and through online streaming.

== Notes ==
Preceded by Pittsburgh Penguins; 2016	Pittsburgh Penguins; Stanley Cup champions 2017	Succeeded by Washington Capitals; 2018
