= Ron Hainsey =

American ice hockey player (born 1981)

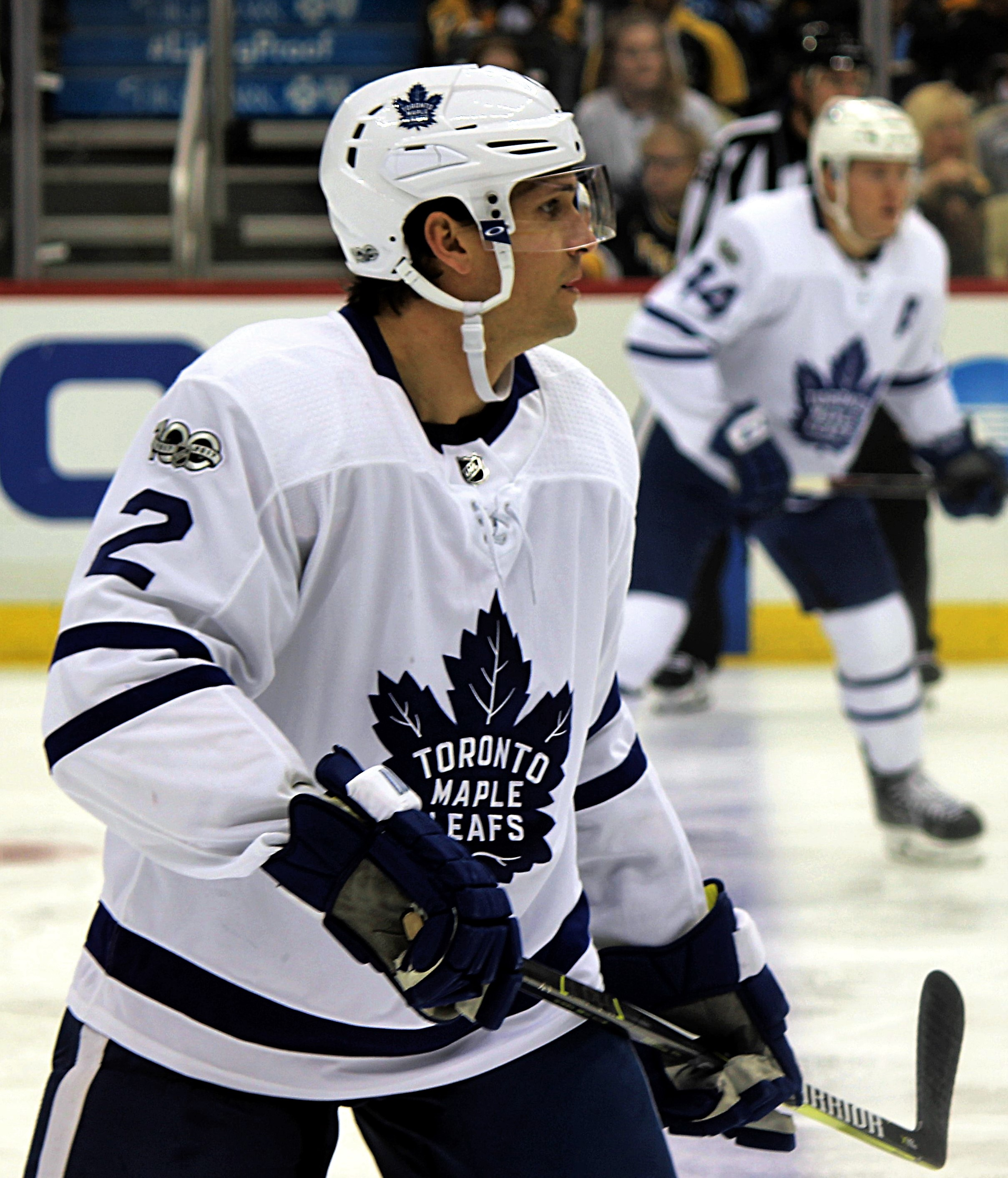
- Hainsey with the Toronto Maple Leafs in 2017
- Born: March 24, 1981 (age 45) Bolton, Connecticut, U.S.
- Height: 6 ft 3 in (191 cm)
- Weight: 210 lb (95 kg; 15 st 0 lb)
- Position: Defense
- Shot: Left
- Played for: Montreal Canadiens; Columbus Blue Jackets; Atlanta Thrashers; Winnipeg Jets; Carolina Hurricanes; Pittsburgh Penguins; Toronto Maple Leafs; Ottawa Senators
- National team: United States
- NHL draft: 13th overall, 2000; Montreal Canadiens
- Playing career: 2001–2020

Ronald Martin Hainsey (born March 24, 1981) is an American former professional ice hockey defenseman. He played seventeen years in the National Hockey League (NHL) for the Montreal Canadiens, Columbus Blue Jackets, Atlanta Thrashers, Winnipeg Jets, Carolina Hurricanes, Pittsburgh Penguins, Toronto Maple Leafs and the Ottawa Senators, playing over 1,100 career NHL games.

Hainsey played in the NHL for nearly 16 years (907 games) before a late season trade to the 2016–17 Pittsburgh Penguins saw him play on a team that made the playoffs, longer than any other player in league history, beating the previous record of 799 games held by Olli Jokinen. He won that season's Stanley Cup with the Penguins in his debut playoff appearance, finishing second in ice time for the playoffs in place of the injured Kris Letang. His non-playoffs record was passed by Jeff Skinner in 2023.

== Early life ==
Hainsey was born on March 24, 1981, in Bolton, Connecticut, to Marty and Kerry Hainsey. He learned how to skate at the Bolton Ice Palace.

== Playing career ==
=== Early career ===
As a youth, Hainsey played in the 1995 Quebec International Pee-Wee Hockey Tournament with a minor ice hockey team from Springfield, Massachusetts.

Hainsey was drafted in the first round, 13th overall, by the Montreal Canadiens in the 2000 NHL entry draft, from the University of Massachusetts Lowell (1999-2001) of the Hockey East NCAA conference. He began his professional career with Montreal's American Hockey League (AHL) affiliates, the Quebec Citadelles and Hamilton Bulldogs, and played in the Calder Cup finals against the Houston Aeros, which the Bulldogs lost. Hainsey made his NHL debut for the Canadiens on October 11, 2002, versus the New York Rangers in New York.

=== Columbus Blue Jackets ===
After spending three seasons with the Canadiens organization, Hainsey was claimed off waivers on November 29, 2005, by the Columbus Blue Jackets, where he established himself as a solid two-way defenseman.

=== Atlanta Thrashers / Winnipeg Jets ===
On July 2, 2008, as a free agent, Hainsey signed a five-year, $22.5 million contract with the Atlanta Thrashers. He recorded 6 goals and 33 assists in his first season in Atlanta. He would go on to record 45 points in the next two seasons with the Thrashers. After their relocation to Winnipeg, Manitoba, to become the Winnipeg Jets to start the 2011–12 season, Hainsey recorded 10 assists in 56 games.

Hainsey also played a role in the negotiations of the 2012–13 NHL lockout. After a day of marathon bargaining sessions on December 5, 2012, Hainsey emerged to tell the media that both sides planned to meet again the next day. He was a key part of the negotiating team for the National Hockey League Players' Association (NHLPA) in the lockout. On January 6, 2013, an agreement was reached to end the lockout. He finished the 2012–13 season with no goals and 13 points in 47 games with the Jets.

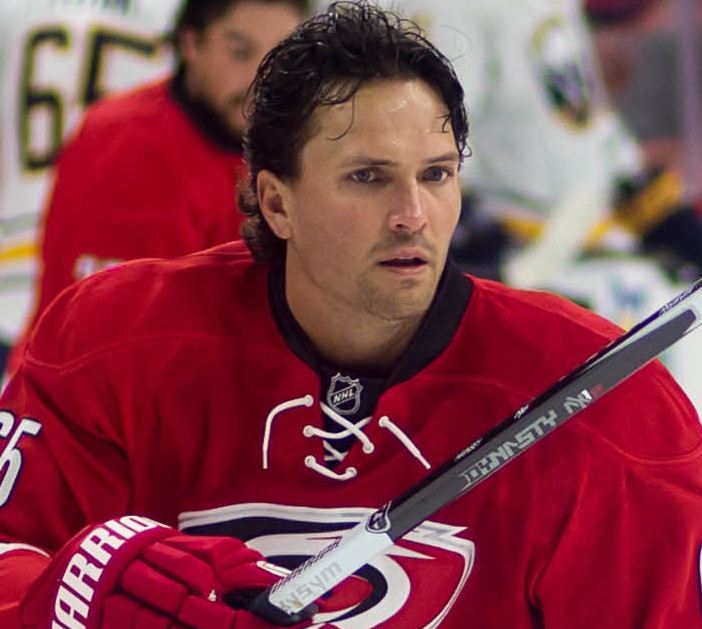
Hainsey with the Hurricanes in 2014.

=== Carolina Hurricanes ===
On September 12, 2013, Hainsey signed a one-year, $2 million contract with the Carolina Hurricanes after the team announced that defenseman Joni Pitkänen would miss the season due to injury. On June 24, 2014, Hainsey signed a new three-year, $8.5 million contract with the Hurricanes. Hainsey was named an alternate captain of the Hurricanes during the 2015–16 season. He marked his 200th NHL assist against the Pittsburgh Penguins on January 20, 2017.

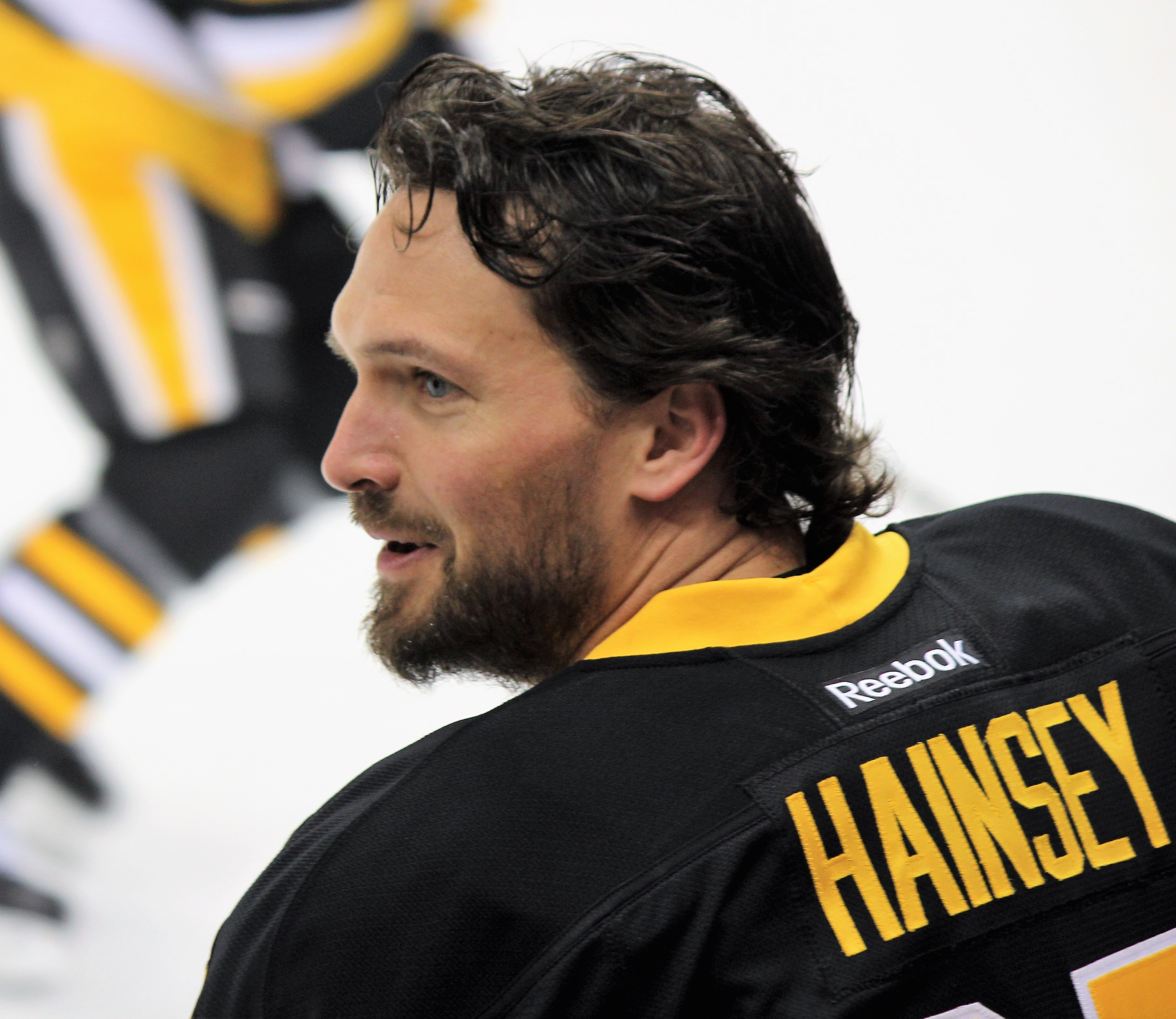
Hainsey with the Penguins in 2017, where he made his playoff debut and won the Stanley Cup.

=== Pittsburgh Penguins ===
On February 23, 2017, Hainsey, in the final year of his contract, was traded to the Pittsburgh Penguins in exchange for a second-round pick in the 2017 NHL entry draft and Danny Kristo. It was the first time that he had been traded in his career. It was with the Penguins that on April 12, 2017, after 907 career NHL games and surpassing Olli Jokinen's previous playoff games drought "record", Hainsey made his Stanley Cup playoff debut, doing so against the Columbus Blue Jackets. Hainsey and the Penguins went on to win the Stanley Cup over the Nashville Predators in the Final. He was the first player captain Sidney Crosby handed the trophy to, following the victory.

=== Toronto Maple Leafs ===
An unrestricted free agent following the season, Hainsey signed a two-year, $6 million contract with the Toronto Maple Leafs on July 1, 2017. He was signed to replace the departing Matt Hunwick, who coincidentally signed with the Penguins that same day. Hainsey was often played alongside Morgan Rielly on the Leafs top defence pairing. On November 1, 2018, Hainsey played in his 1,000 career NHL game.

=== Ottawa Senators ===
On July 1, 2019, Hainsey signed a one-year, $3.5 million contract with the Ottawa Senators. For the 2019–20 season, Hainsey was named an alternate captain for the Senators. On December 10, 2019, Hainsey played in his 1,100th game, playing against the team which drafted him, the Montreal Canadiens in Montreal. On December 19, 2019, it was announced that Hainsey suffered a knee injury in the 5–4 overtime victory over the Nashville Predators. He missed seven games before returning to the ice on January 9, 2020. On April 1, 2021, Hainsey announced his retirement from the NHL.

== Career statistics ==
=== Regular season and playoffs ===
			Regular season					Playoffs
Season	Team	League	GP	G	A	Pts	PIM	GP	G	A	Pts	PIM
1996–97	New England Jr. Whalers	EJHL
1997–98	US NTDP U17	USDP	18	2	7	9	28	—	—	—	—	—
1997–98	US NTDP Juniors	USHL	3	0	0	0	0	—	—	—	—	—
1997–98	US NTDP U18	NAHL	40	4	7	11	16	5	0	1	1	0
1998–99	US NTDP Juniors	USHL	48	5	12	17	45	—	—	—	—	—
1999–2000	University of Massachusetts Lowell	HE	30	3	8	11	20	—	—	—	—	—
2000–01	University of Massachusetts Lowell	HE	33	10	26	36	51	—	—	—	—	—
2000–01	Quebec Citadelles	AHL	4	1	0	1	0	1	0	0	0	0
2001–02	Quebec Citadelles	AHL	63	7	24	31	26	3	0	0	0	0
2002–03	Montreal Canadiens	NHL	21	0	0	0	2	—	—	—	—	—
2002–03	Hamilton Bulldogs	AHL	33	2	11	13	26	23	1	10	11	20
2003–04	Montreal Canadiens	NHL	11	1	1	2	4	—	—	—	—	—
2003–04	Hamilton Bulldogs	AHL	54	7	24	31	35	10	0	5	5	6
2004–05	Hamilton Bulldogs	AHL	68	9	14	23	45	4	1	1	2	0
2005–06	Hamilton Bulldogs	AHL	22	3	14	17	19	—	—	—	—	—
2005–06	Columbus Blue Jackets	NHL	55	2	15	17	43	—	—	—	—	—
2006–07	Columbus Blue Jackets	NHL	80	9	25	34	69	—	—	—	—	—
2007–08	Columbus Blue Jackets	NHL	78	8	24	32	25	—	—	—	—	—
2008–09	Atlanta Thrashers	NHL	81	6	33	39	32	—	—	—	—	—
2009–10	Atlanta Thrashers	NHL	80	5	21	26	39	—	—	—	—	—
2010–11	Atlanta Thrashers	NHL	82	3	16	19	24	—	—	—	—	—
2011–12	Winnipeg Jets	NHL	56	0	10	10	23	—	—	—	—	—
2012–13	Winnipeg Jets	NHL	47	0	13	13	10	—	—	—	—	—
2013–14	Carolina Hurricanes	NHL	82	4	11	15	45	—	—	—	—	—
2014–15	Carolina Hurricanes	NHL	81	2	8	10	16	—	—	—	—	—
2015–16	Carolina Hurricanes	NHL	81	5	14	19	37	—	—	—	—	–
2016–17	Carolina Hurricanes	NHL	56	4	10	14	17	—	—	—	—	—
2016–17	Pittsburgh Penguins	NHL	16	0	3	3	4	25	2	6	8	6
2017–18	Toronto Maple Leafs	NHL	80	4	19	23	20	7	0	1	1	4
2018–19	Toronto Maple Leafs	NHL	81	5	18	23	21	7	0	1	1	2
2019–20	Ottawa Senators	NHL	64	1	11	12	12	—	—	—	—	—
NHL totals			1,132	59	252	311	443	39	2	8	10	12

=== International ===
Year	Team	Event	Result	GP	G	A	Pts	PIM
1999	United States	WJC18	7th	6	2	1	3	8
2000	United States	WJC	4th	7	1	1	2	4
2001	United States	WJC	5th	7	0	5	5	2
2009	United States	WC	4th	9	2	4	6	2
Junior totals				20	3	7	10	14
Senior totals				9	2	4	6	2

== Awards and honors ==
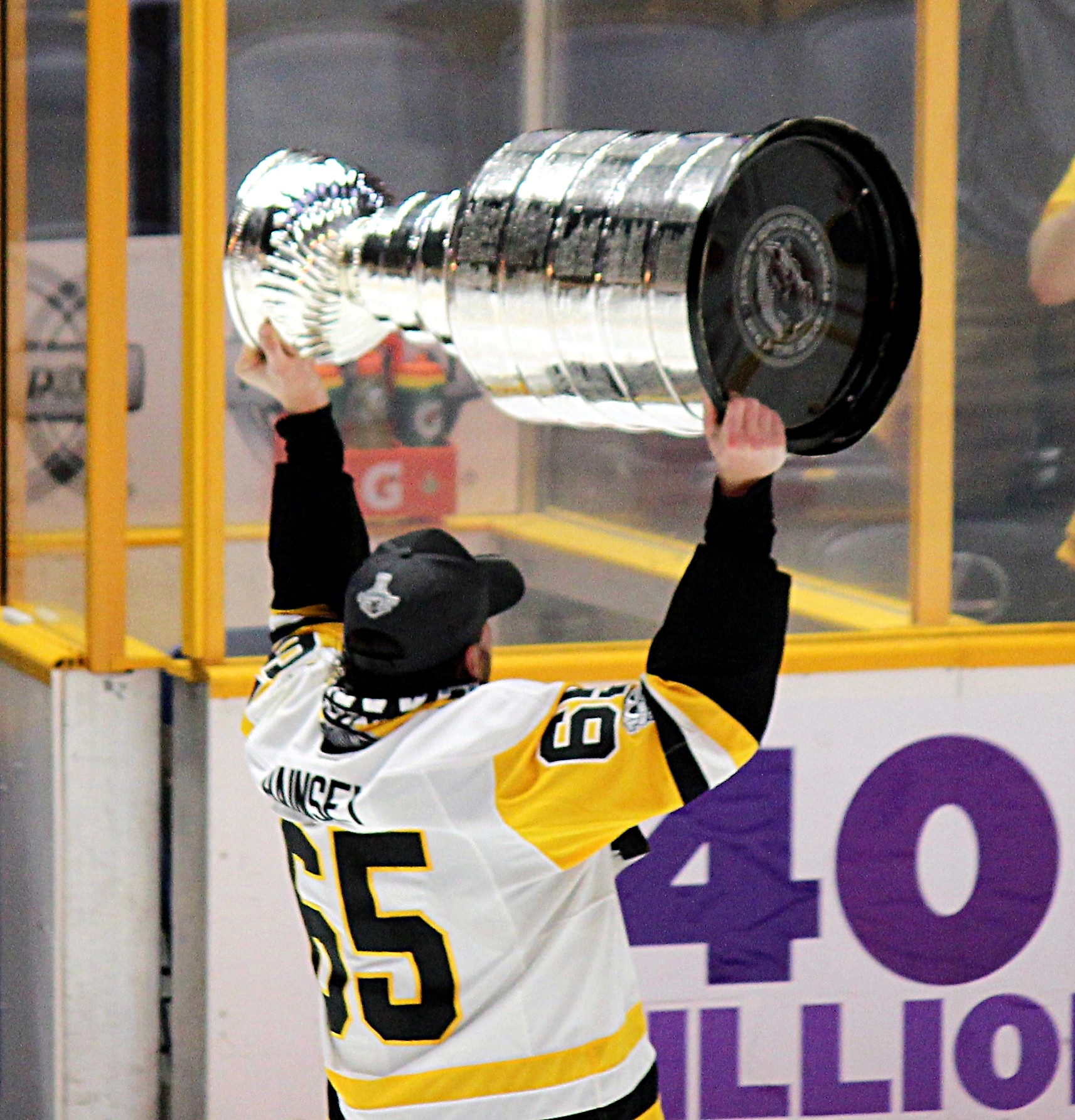
Hainsey with the Stanley Cup, after winning the 2017 Stanley Cup Final with the Pittsburgh Penguins.

Award	Year
College
All-Hockey East Rookie Team	2000
All-Hockey East First Team	2001
AHCA East Second-Team All-American	2001
AHL
All-Star Game	2002
All-Rookie Team	2002
NHL
Stanley Cup champion	2017

== Personal life ==
Hainsey and his wife Hayley have three children. Hainsey met his wife in Hamilton, Ontario, when he was playing for the Hamilton Bulldogs. Following his retirement from the NHL, Hainsey became an executive in the NHLPA.

Awards and achievements
Preceded by Eric Chouinard	Montreal Canadiens first-round draft pick 2000	Succeeded by Marcel Hossa
