= NHL Research, Development and Orientation Camp =

The NHL Research, Development and Orientation Camp is an annual two-day event held by the National Hockey League for the purpose of testing potential changes to the rules of the game of ice hockey, ranging from the subtle variety to the more drastic kind.

The event allows the NHL to experiment with potential changes to the game, while using top prospects for the NHL entry draft as guinea pigs in the on-ice experiments.

NHL commissioner Gary Bettman describes the event as “an opportunity to try new things, look at things, even if we never implement them”.
