= Mattias Ekholm =

Swedish ice hockey player (born 1990)

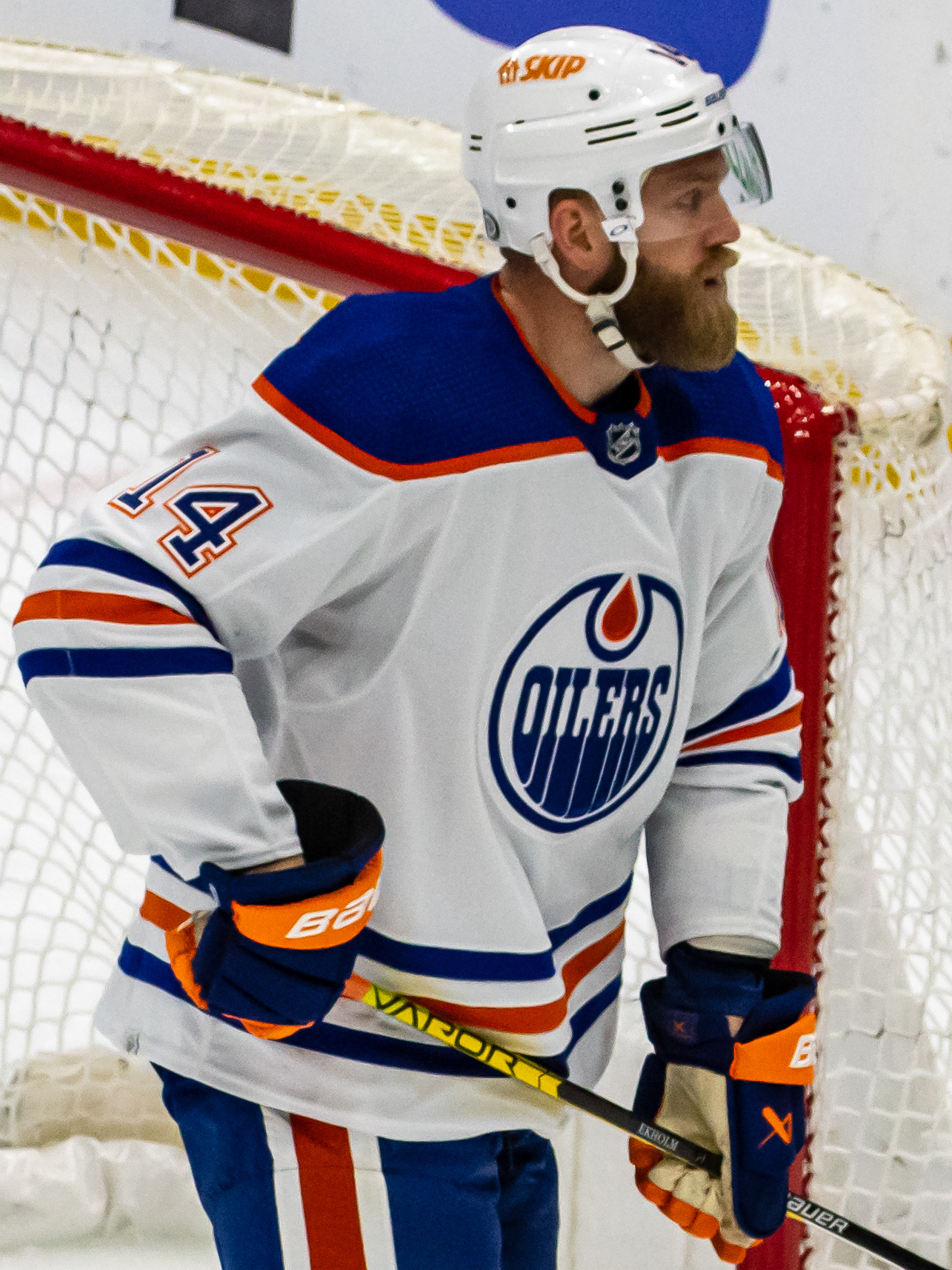
- Ekholm with the Oilers in March 2023
- Born: 24 May 1990 (age 36) Borlänge, Sweden
- Height: 6 ft 4 in (193 cm)
- Weight: 211 lb (96 kg; 15 st 1 lb)
- Position: Defence
- Shoots: Left
- NHL team Former teams: Edmonton Oilers; Mora IK; Brynäs IF; Nashville Predators
- National team: Sweden
- NHL draft: 102nd overall, 2009; Nashville Predators
- Playing career: 2007–present

Mattias Hans Ekholm (born 24 May 1990) is a Swedish professional ice hockey player who is a defenceman for the Edmonton Oilers of the National Hockey League (NHL). He was drafted in the fourth round, 102nd overall, of the 2009 NHL entry draft by the Nashville Predators.

== Playing career ==
While playing with Mora IK in Sweden, Ekholm was drafted in the fourth round, 102nd overall, by the Nashville Predators of the National Hockey League (NHL). Following the draft, he participated in Predators 2009 Development Camp. After recording a blazing start with 7 goals and 5 assists in his first 14 games with Brynäs, Ekholm was announced to be the first of four Elitserien Rookie of the Year candidates for the 2010–11 season. He would go on to win the award.

=== Nashville Predators ===
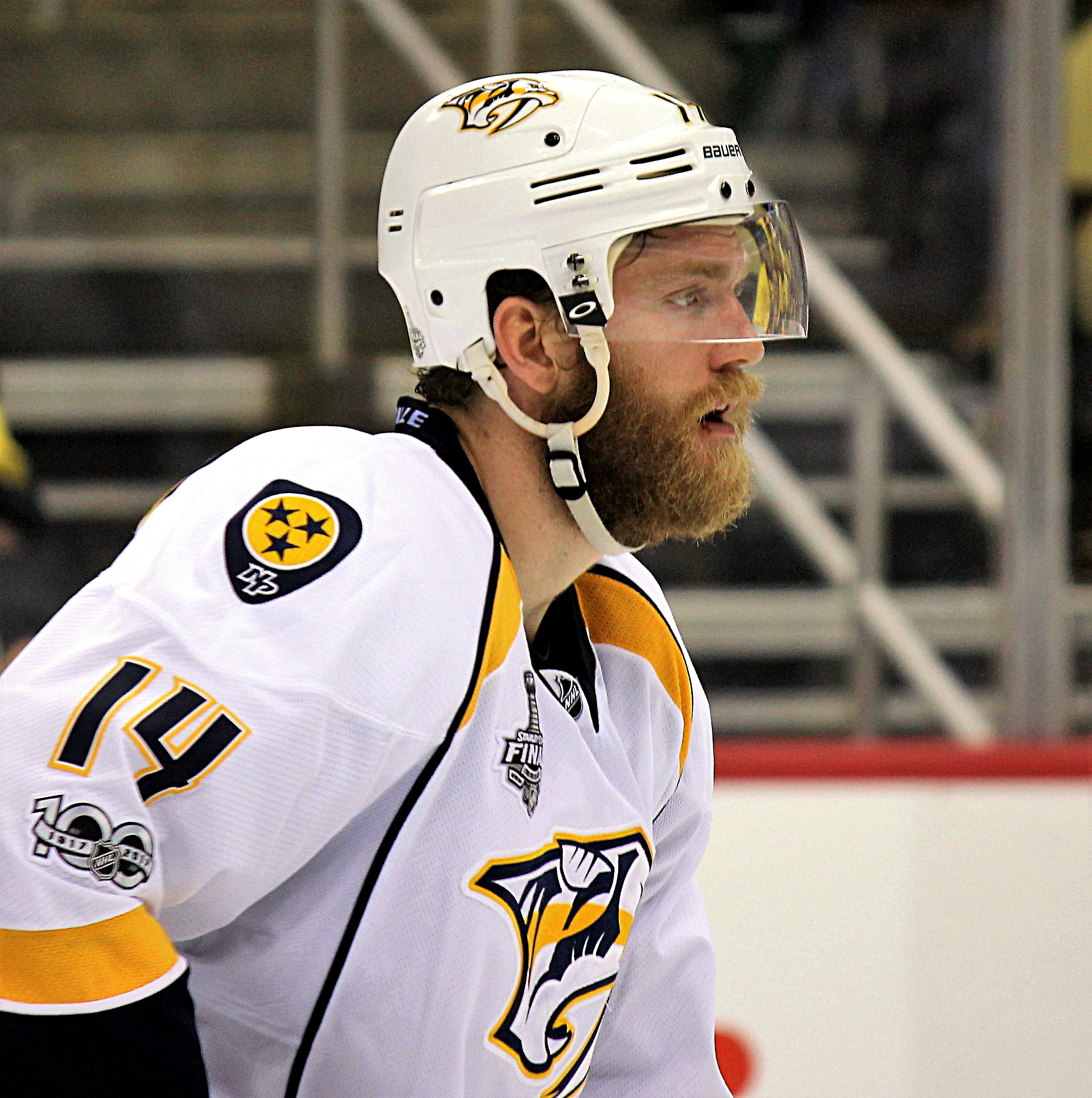
Ekholm as member of the Nashville Predators in 2017

Following the 2010–11 season, Ekholm signed a three-year entry-level contract to play with the Predators for the 2011–12 season. After attending their training camp, Ekholm was named to the Predators opening night roster for his North America debut. However, Ekholm was a healthy scratch for the first five games of the 2011–12 season before making his debut in their home opener against the Phoenix Coyotes. He played two games with the Predators before returning to Brynäs for the remainder of the season. This was due to a predetermined deal Ekholm made with the Predators during the summer. Ekholm tallied one goal and one assists in his first six games back in Sweden. He continued to produce and won the Borje Salming Award as the top defenceman in the Swedish Elite League after talling eight goals and 16 points in 40 regular-season games.

Ekholm returned to the Predators for the 2012–13 season but was re-assigned to their American Hockey League (AHL) affiliate, the Milwaukee Admirals on 12 September 2012. By December, Ekholm was leading all Milwaukee defencemen in scoring with four goals and seven assists for 11 points. Due to injuries, Ekholm earned an emergency recall to the NHL level on 15 April 2013. At the time, he had tallied 27 points through 55 games. He logged 16:05 minutes of ice time during a game against the Vancouver Canucks before being reassigned to the Admirals the following day. Ekholm ended the season with 32 points through 59 games.

In the second full year of his contract, Ekholm joined the Predators for the start of their 2013–14 season. He played on the Predators third line along with Seth Jones and Shea Weber. Ekholm scored his first NHL goal in a 3–2 win over the San Jose Sharks on 7 January 2014. He finished the season with nine points through 62 games and was one of six NHL defencemen to play at least 50 games and be assessed 10 or fewer penalty minutes. As such, Ekholm signed a two-year, $2.075 million contract with the Predators as a restricted free agent.

In the first year of his new contract, Ekholm changed his jersey number to 14 to match his World Championship number. Ekholm set career-highs in goals, assists, and points during the season with seven goals and 11 assists for 18 points.

Ekholm made his Stanley Cup Final debut on 29 May 2017, against the Pittsburgh Penguins. Nashville fell to Pittsburgh in six games.

Ekholm was named an alternate captain for the Predators on 19 September 2017, along with Ryan Johansen and Filip Forsberg.

On 11 February 2021, Ekholm was listed as week to week with an undisclosed injury following a game against the Tampa Bay Lightning.

On 13 October 2021, Ekholm signed a four-year, $25 million contract extension with the Predators with an annual average value of $6.25 million.

=== Edmonton Oilers ===
During the 2022–23 season, on 28 February 2023, Ekholm and a 2023 sixth-round pick were traded to the Edmonton Oilers in exchange for a 2023 first-round draft pick, a 2024 fourth-round pick, defenceman Tyson Barrie and forward prospect Reid Schaefer. Ekholm made his Oilers debut on 1 March, a 5–2 victory over the Toronto Maple Leafs. He scored his first goal as an Oiler on 11 March, in another game against the Leafs, this time a 7–4 defeat.

In the 2023-24 season, his first full season with the Oilers, Ekholm put up a career high in goals, points, and plus-minus, with 11, 45, and +44. His +44 plus-minus was the third-highest in the league that year. He finished the season 12th in Norris Trophy voting. His season ended with his second career trip to the Stanley Cup Final, losing in seven games to the Florida Panthers.

Injuries shortened his 2024–25 season to 65 games. His season once again ended in the Stanley Cup Final against Florida, this time losing in six games.

On 8 October 2025, Ekholm signed a three-year, $12 million contract extension with the Oilers that would go into effect during the 2026–27 season. On 26 January 2026, Ekholm scored his first hat-trick in his 938th career game, a 7–4 win over the Anaheim Ducks. His three goals marked the first time in NHL history where a team had two different defencemen score a hat-trick in consecutive games, with Evan Bouchard scoring his first hat-trick just two days prior.

== International play ==
On 6 May 2026, Ekholm was added to Sweden senior team's roster for the 2026 World Championship.

== Personal life ==
Ekholm is married to Ida Björnstad, a former sports broadcaster, and they share three children together.

== Career statistics ==
=== Regular season and playoffs ===
			Regular season					Playoffs
Season	Team	League	GP	G	A	Pts	PIM	GP	G	A	Pts	PIM
2006–07	Mora IK	J18	5	2	2	4	6	—	—	—	—	—
2006–07	Mora IK	J20	36	0	4	4	28	2	0	0	0	0
2007–08	Mora IK	J18	9	4	5	9	12	—	—	—	—	—
2007–08	Mora IK	J20	37	5	7	12	54	—	—	—	—	—
2007–08	Mora IK	SEL	1	0	0	0	0	—	—	—	—	—
2008–09	Mora IK	J20	21	3	5	8	32	—	—	—	—	—
2008–09	Mora IK	Allsv	38	2	11	13	12	3	0	0	0	4
2009–10	Mora IK	Allsv	41	1	21	22	54	2	0	0	0	6
2010–11	Brynäs IF	SEL	55	10	23	33	38	5	0	4	4	10
2011–12	Nashville Predators	NHL	2	0	0	0	0	—	—	—	—	—
2011–12	Brynäs IF	SEL	41	9	8	17	55	17	1	8	9	12
2012–13	Milwaukee Admirals	AHL	59	10	22	32	30	4	0	1	1	0
2012–13	Nashville Predators	NHL	1	0	0	0	0	—	—	—	—	—
2013–14	Nashville Predators	NHL	62	1	8	9	10	—	—	—	—	—
2014–15	Nashville Predators	NHL	80	7	11	18	52	6	1	0	1	2
2015–16	Nashville Predators	NHL	82	8	27	35	44	14	3	4	7	4
2016–17	Nashville Predators	NHL	82	3	20	23	34	22	1	10	11	38
2017–18	Nashville Predators	NHL	81	10	24	34	46	13	1	7	8	12
2018–19	Nashville Predators	NHL	80	8	36	44	47	6	0	2	2	12
2019–20	Nashville Predators	NHL	68	8	25	33	32	4	0	1	1	0
2020–21	Nashville Predators	NHL	48	6	17	23	14	6	0	3	3	6
2021–22	Nashville Predators	NHL	76	6	25	31	44	4	0	2	2	0
2022–23	Nashville Predators	NHL	57	5	13	18	24	—	—	—	—	—
2022–23	Edmonton Oilers	NHL	21	4	10	14	4	12	1	6	7	8
2023–24	Edmonton Oilers	NHL	79	11	34	45	47	25	5	5	10	6
2024–25	Edmonton Oilers	NHL	65	9	24	33	30	7	1	5	6	14
2025–26	Edmonton Oilers	NHL	82	6	35	41	30	6	0	2	2	0
NHL totals			966	92	309	401	458	125	13	47	60	102
SHL totals			97	19	31	50	93	22	1	12	13	22

=== International ===
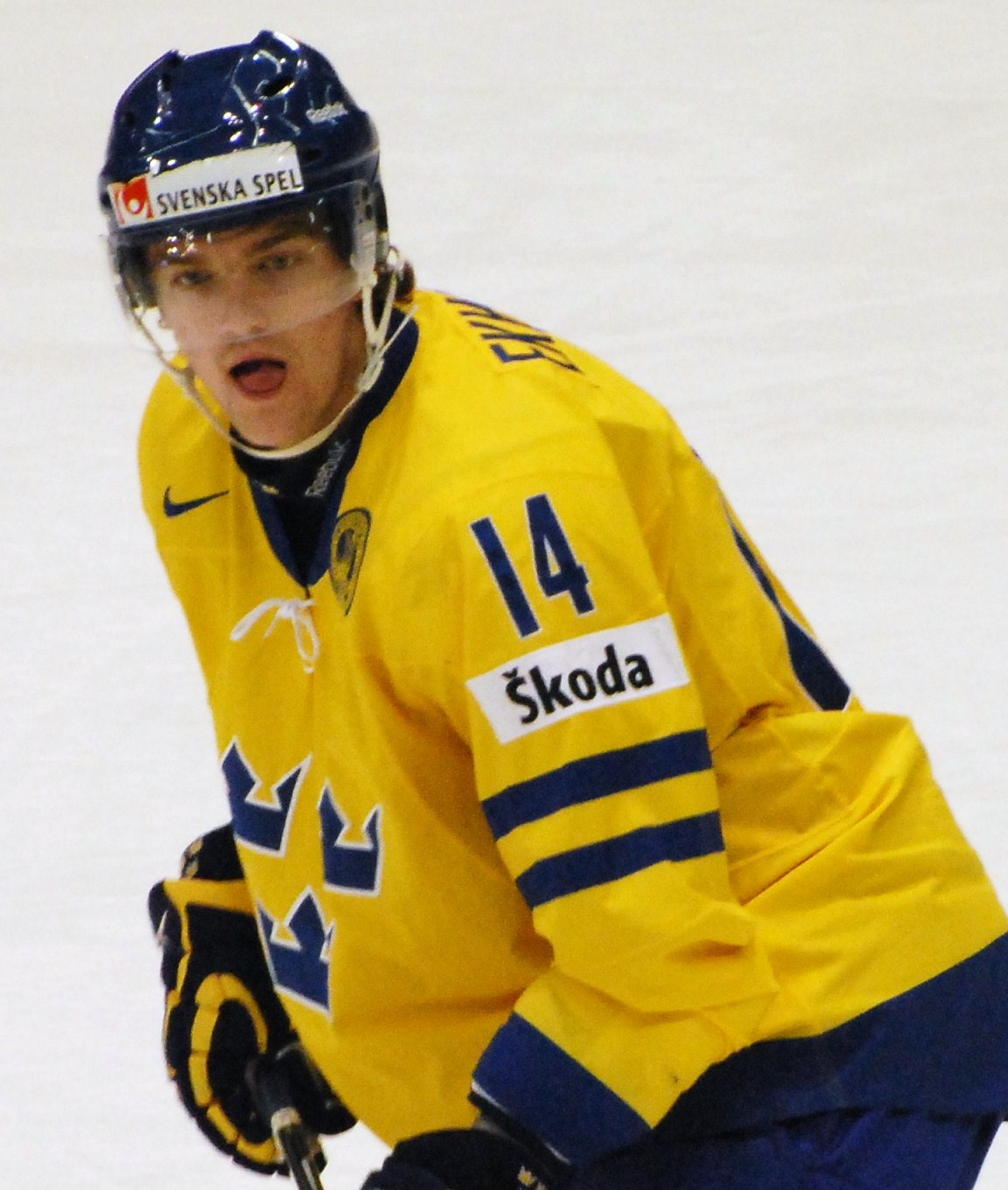

Medal record

Men's ice hockey

Representing Sweden

World Championships
Gold medal – first place	2018 Denmark	
Bronze medal – third place	2014 Belarus	

World Junior Championships
Bronze medal – third place	2010 Canada	

Year	Team	Event	Result	GP	G	A	Pts	PIM
2007	Sweden	IH18	1st place, gold medalist(s)	4	1	1	2	2
2008	Sweden	U18	4th	6	1	0	1	2
2010	Sweden	WJC	3rd place, bronze medalist(s)	6	1	0	1	6
2014	Sweden	WC	3rd place, bronze medalist(s)	10	2	5	7	8
2015	Sweden	WC	5th	8	0	3	3	6
2016	Sweden	WC	6th	2	1	0	1	2
2016	Sweden	WCH	3rd	4	0	0	0	2
2018	Sweden	WC	1st place, gold medalist(s)	4	1	2	3	2
2019	Sweden	WC	5th	8	0	2	2	4
2025	Sweden	4NF	3rd	3	0	1	1	0
2026	Sweden	WC	7th	8	3	2	5	0
Junior totals				16	3	1	4	10
Senior totals				47	7	15	22	24

== Awards and honours ==
Award	Year
Elitserien Rookie of the Year	2011
Le Mat Trophy champion	2012
Salming Trophy	2012
The Hockey News, Rod Langway Award	2018
