= Ryan Dzingel =

American ice hockey player (born 1992)

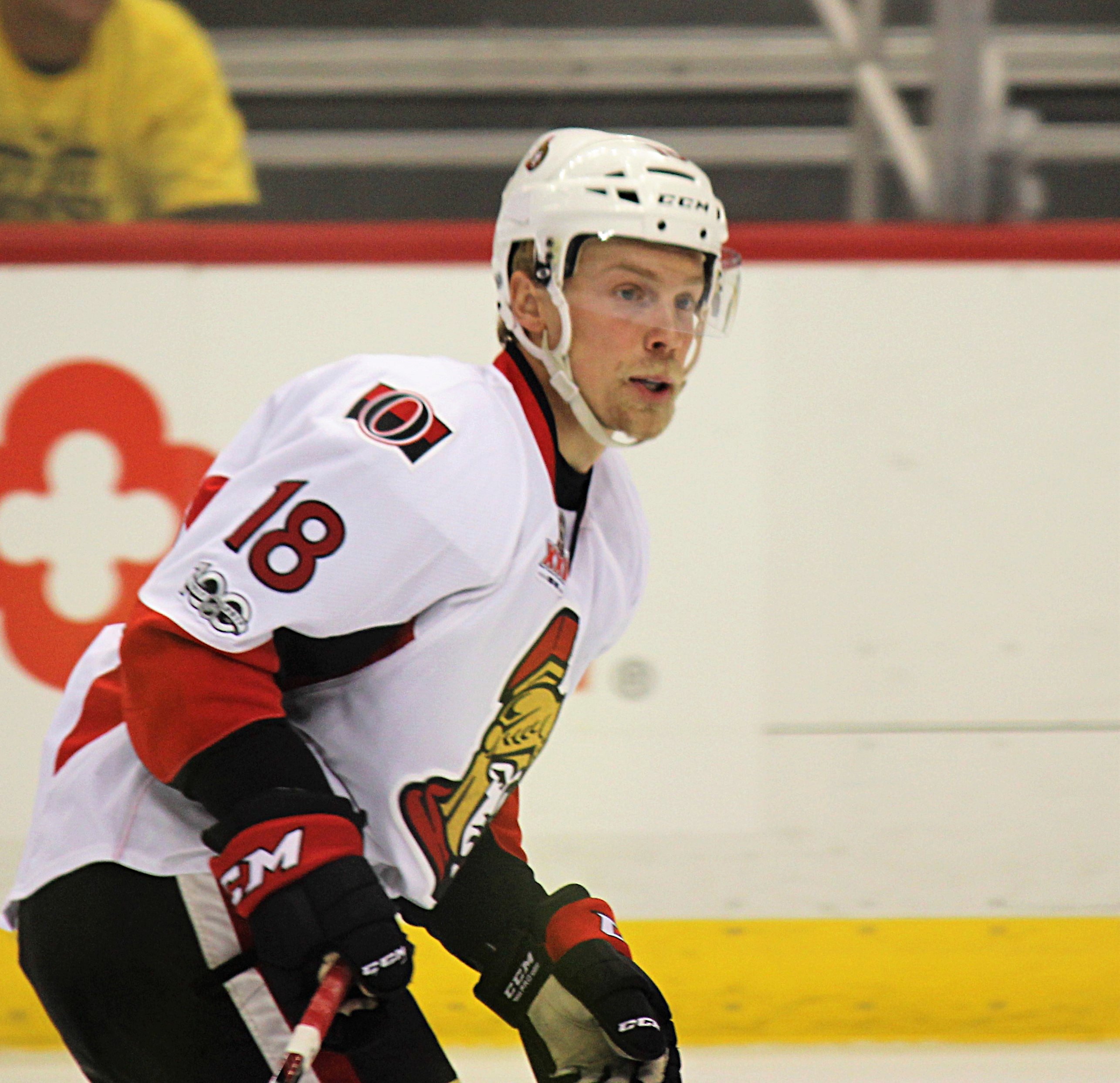
- Dzingel with the Ottawa Senators during the 2017 Stanley Cup playoffs
- Born: March 9, 1992 (age 34) Wheaton, Illinois, U.S.
- Height: 6 ft 0 in (183 cm)
- Weight: 190 lb (86 kg; 13 st 8 lb)
- Position: Forward
- Shot: Left
- Played for: Ottawa Senators; Columbus Blue Jackets; Carolina Hurricanes; Arizona Coyotes; San Jose Sharks
- NHL draft: 204th overall, 2011; Ottawa Senators
- Playing career: 2014–2024

Ryan Michael Dzingel (born March 9, 1992) is an American former professional ice hockey forward. He played for the Ottawa Senators, Columbus Blue Jackets, Carolina Hurricanes, Arizona Coyotes and San Jose Sharks of the National Hockey League (NHL). He was drafted by the Senators in the seventh round (204th overall) of the 2011 NHL entry draft. Prior to becoming professional, Dzingel played three seasons of college hockey with the Ohio State Buckeyes where he was named to the 2013–14 All-Big Ten First Team and West First-Team All-American.

== Playing career ==
=== Amateur ===
As a youth, Dzingel played in the 2005 Quebec International Pee-Wee Hockey Tournament with the Chicago Mission minor ice hockey team.

While playing with the Lincoln Stars in the United States Hockey League, Dzingel was drafted 204th overall by the Ottawa Senators and committed to play for the Ohio State University.

On January 10, 2014, Dzingel recorded the first hat trick in Big Ten history to help lead the Ohio State Buckeyes to a 5–3 win over Michigan State. Following an outstanding junior year with the Buckeyes, Dzingel was named to the 2013–14 All-Big Ten First Team. Prior to his senior year, Dzingel signed an entry-level contract with the Senators on April 2, 2014 and reported to their American Hockey League (AHL) affiliate, the Binghamton Senators, ending his collegiate career.

=== Professional ===
==== Ottawa Senators ====
On December 22, 2015, Dzingel made his NHL debut with Ottawa versus the Florida Panthers as a replacement for injured Bobby Ryan. He scored his first career NHL goal on February 16, 2016, in a 2–1 shootout win over the Buffalo Sabres.

During the 2016–17 season, his first full year with the Senators, Dzingel recorded 14 goals and 32 points in 81 games. On July 21, 2017, the Senators re-signed Dzingel to a two-year, $3.6 million contract worth $1.8 million annually, avoiding arbitration. During the 2018–19 season, Dzingel played well with new linemate Matt Duchene, scoring 22 goals and 44 points in 57 games. However, he rejected the Senators' contract extension offer and was made available for trade.

==== Columbus Blue Jackets ====
On February 24, 2019, Dzingel, along with a 2019 seventh-round pick, was traded to the Columbus Blue Jackets in exchange for Anthony Duclair and second-round picks in 2020 and 2021. He had four goals and 12 points in the final 21 games with Columbus, but only scored one goal in 9 games in the 2019 Stanley Cup Playoffs.

==== Carolina Hurricanes ====
On July 12, 2019, Dzingel signed as an unrestricted free agent to a two-year, $6.75 million contract with the Carolina Hurricanes.

==== Return to Ottawa ====
In his final year under contract with the Hurricanes in the pandemic delayed 2020–21 season, Dzingel was unable to have the desired impact producing just 2 goals and 4 points in 11 games before he was traded back to the Senators in exchange for Alex Galchenyuk and Cédric Paquette on February 13, 2021. Dzingel played out the remainder of his contract with the Senators, posting 6 goals and 9 points in 29 games.

==== Arizona Coyotes ====
On July 28, 2021, as a free agent from the Senators, Dzingel was signed to a one-year, $1.1 million contract with his fourth NHL club, the Arizona Coyotes. He recorded seven points in 26 games with Arizona.

==== San Jose Sharks ====
On February 19, 2022, Dzingel was traded along with Ilya Lyubushkin to the Toronto Maple Leafs in exchange for Nick Ritchie and either a third-round pick in 2023 or a second-round pick in 2025. The next day, Toronto placed him on waivers. Dzingel was subsequently claimed off waivers by the San Jose Sharks. He added one point in six games with the Sharks.

==== AHL ====
On July 25, 2022, Dzingel returned as a free agent to the Carolina Hurricanes and was signed to a one-year, two-way $750,000 contract. On October 6, 2022, Dzingel was among the final players cut from training camp and assigned to the Chicago Wolves of the AHL. He was named an alternate captain with the Wolves. While with the Wolves, Dzingel suffered a serious back injury on November 20, 2022. He returned to action in March 2023. He appeared in 22 games with the Wolves, scoring two goals and 11 points.

An unrestricted free agent, he signed a professional tryout agreement with the Arizona Coyotes in the offseason, but was released from the team during training camp. He remained unattached until signing a professional tryout with the Henderson Silver Knights of the AHL on March 12, 2024.

== Personal life ==
Dzingel was born in Wheaton, Illinois, to parents Rick and Linda, along with two siblings. His father Rick played baseball growing up, including within the St. Louis Cardinals organization.

== Career statistics ==
			Regular season					Playoffs
Season	Team	League	GP	G	A	Pts	PIM	GP	G	A	Pts	PIM
2007–08	Team Illinois 16U AAA	T1EHL	31	6	14	20	20	—	—	—	—	—
2008–09	Team Illinois 16U AAA	T1EHL	31	18	15	33	30	—	—	—	—	—
2009–10	Team Illinois 18U AAA	T1EHL	31	19	27	46	28	—	—	—	—	—
2009–10	Lincoln Stars	USHL	36	11	15	26	38	—	—	—	—	—
2010–11	Lincoln Stars	USHL	54	23	44	67	8	2	1	0	1	2
2011–12	Ohio State Buckeyes	CCHA	33	7	17	24	32	—	—	—	—	—
2012–13	Ohio State Buckeyes	CCHA	40	16	22	38	22	—	—	—	—	—
2013–14	Ohio State Buckeyes	B1G	37	22	24	46	34	—	—	—	—	—
2013–14	Binghamton Senators	AHL	9	2	5	7	9	1	0	0	0	0
2014–15	Binghamton Senators	AHL	66	17	17	34	50	—	—	—	—	—
2015–16	Binghamton Senators	AHL	44	12	24	36	22	—	—	—	—	—
2015–16	Ottawa Senators	NHL	30	3	6	9	11	—	—	—	—	—
2016–17	Ottawa Senators	NHL	81	14	18	32	30	15	2	1	3	4
2017–18	Ottawa Senators	NHL	79	23	18	41	35	—	—	—	—	—
2018–19	Ottawa Senators	NHL	57	22	22	44	29	—	—	—	—	—
2018–19	Columbus Blue Jackets	NHL	21	4	8	12	0	9	1	0	1	2
2019–20	Carolina Hurricanes	NHL	64	8	21	29	30	4	0	0	0	2
2020–21	Carolina Hurricanes	NHL	11	2	2	4	2	—	—	—	—	—
2020–21	Ottawa Senators	NHL	29	6	3	9	19	—	—	—	—	—
2021–22	Arizona Coyotes	NHL	26	4	3	7	35	—	—	—	—	—
2021–22	San Jose Sharks	NHL	6	1	0	1	0	—	—	—	—	—
2022–23	Chicago Wolves	AHL	22	2	9	11	12	—	—	—	—	—
2023–24	Henderson Silver Knights	AHL	12	4	1	5	4	—	—	—	—	—
NHL totals			404	87	101	188	191	28	3	1	4	8

Medal record

Ice hockey

Representing (United States) USA

World Junior A Challenge
Gold medal – first place	2010 Penticton	

== Awards and honors ==
Award	Year
College
All-Big Ten First Team	2014
AHCA West First-Team All-American	2014
