= 2017 Stanley Cup playoffs =

Playoff tournament of the NHL

Tournament details
- Dates: April 12–June 11, 2017
- Teams: 16
- Defending champions: Pittsburgh Penguins

Final positions
- Champions: Pittsburgh Penguins (5th title)
- Runners-up: Nashville Predators

Tournament statistics
- Scoring leader(s): Evgeni Malkin (Penguins) (28 points)

Awards
- MVP: Sidney Crosby (Penguins)

The 2017 Stanley Cup playoffs was the playoff tournament of the National Hockey League (NHL) for the 2016–17 regular season. They began on April 12, 2017, after the regular season, and they concluded on June 11, 2017, with the Pittsburgh Penguins defeating the Nashville Predators four games to two in the Finals. The Penguins won their fifth overall Stanley Cup, and became the first team to win back-to-back championships since the 1998 Detroit Red Wings.

The Washington Capitals qualified for the playoffs as the Presidents' Trophy winners for the second consecutive year with the most points (i.e. best record) during the regular season. The Detroit Red Wings failed to make the playoffs for the first time since the 1989–90 season, ending both the NHL's and the Major North American Sports longest active playoff streak at 25 consecutive seasons; the streak was also tied for the third-longest streak in NHL history. The San Antonio Spurs of the NBA now owned the longest playoffs streak at 20 years in Major North American Sports. The longest active NHL playoff streak was assumed by the Penguins with eleven consecutive appearances. The Edmonton Oilers made the playoffs for the first time since 2006, ending a then-record-tying playoff drought for a team with ten years missed (the Florida Panthers also missed the playoffs between 2001 and 2011 inclusively. Buffalo set the record in 2022 missing eleven consecutive postseasons). For the first time since 2006, both Alberta teams, the Oilers and the Calgary Flames, qualified for the postseason in the same year. For the first time since 2013, and the fourth time since 2002, all three Eastern Canadian teams (Montreal Canadiens, Ottawa Senators, and Toronto Maple Leafs) qualified for the playoffs. In all, five Canadian-based teams made the playoffs, matching 2004 and 2015, after a season in which none of the seven teams in Canada contended. Five Original Six teams made the playoffs, with only the previously mentioned Red Wings failing to make it.

The first round saw eighteen overtime games, eclipsing the previous record of seventeen overtime games in the first round set in 2013. There were 27 total overtime games in these playoffs, one short of the record set in 1993. It was also the first time since 2001 that no first round series went the full seven games.

For the eighth season in a row (and the twelfth time in the last fourteen seasons), a California-based team advanced the Western Conference final.

== Playoff seeds ==
This was the fourth year in which the top three teams in each division make the playoffs, along with two wild cards in each conference (for a total of eight playoff teams from each conference).

The following teams qualified for the playoffs:

=== Eastern Conference ===
==== Atlantic Division ====
1. Montreal Canadiens, Atlantic Division champions – 103 points
2. Ottawa Senators – 98 points
3. Boston Bruins – 95 points (42 ROWs)

==== Metropolitan Division ====
1. Washington Capitals, Metropolitan Division champions, Eastern Conference regular season champions, Presidents' Trophy winners – 118 points
2. Pittsburgh Penguins – 111 points
3. Columbus Blue Jackets – 108 points

==== Wild cards ====
1. New York Rangers – 102 points
2. Toronto Maple Leafs – 95 points (39 ROWs)

=== Western Conference ===
==== Central Division ====
1. Chicago Blackhawks, Central Division champions, Western Conference regular season champions – 109 points
2. Minnesota Wild – 106 points
3. St. Louis Blues – 99 points

==== Pacific Division ====
1. Anaheim Ducks, Pacific Division champions – 105 points
2. Edmonton Oilers – 103 points
3. San Jose Sharks – 99 points

==== Wild cards ====
1. Calgary Flames – 94 points (41 ROWs)
2. Nashville Predators – 94 points (39 ROWs)

== Playoff bracket ==
In each round, teams competed in a best-of-seven series following a 2–2–1–1–1 format (scores in the bracket indicate the number of games won in each best-of-seven series). The team with home ice advantage played at home for games one and two (and games five and seven, if necessary), and the other team was at home for games three and four (and game six, if necessary). The top three teams in each division made the playoffs, along with two wild cards in each conference, for a total of eight teams from each conference.

In the first round, the lower seeded wild card in the conference played against the division winner with the best record while the other wild card played against the other division winner, and both wild cards were de facto #4 seeds. The other series matched the second and third place teams from the divisions. In the first two rounds, home ice advantage was awarded to the team with the better seed; in the last two rounds, it was awarded to the team that had the better regular season record.

First round | Second round
A1 | Montreal | 2
WC1 | NY Rangers | 4
WC1 | NY Rangers | 2
A2 | Ottawa | 4
A2 | Ottawa | 4
A3 | Boston | 2
Eastern Conference
M1 | Washington | 4
WC2 | Toronto | 2
M1 | Washington | 3
M2 | Pittsburgh | 4
M2 | Pittsburgh | 4
M3 | Columbus | 1
C1 | Chicago | 0
WC2 | Nashville | 4
WC2 | Nashville | 4
C3 | St. Louis | 2
C2 | Minnesota | 1
C3 | St. Louis | 4
Western Conference
P1 | Anaheim | 4
WC1 | Calgary | 0
P1 | Anaheim | 4
P2 | Edmonton | 3
P2 | Edmonton | 4
P3 | San Jose | 2

Conference finals
A2 | Ottawa | 3
M2 | Pittsburgh | 4
WC2 | Nashville | 4
P1 | Anaheim | 2

Stanley Cup Finals
M2 | Pittsburgh | 4
WC2 | Nashville | 2

Legend

- A1, A2, A3 – The first, second, and third place teams from the Atlantic Division, respectively
- M1, M2, M3 – The first, second, and third place teams from the Metropolitan Division, respectively
- C1, C2, C3 – The first, second, and third place teams from the Central Division, respectively
- P1, P2, P3 – The first, second, and third place teams from the Pacific Division, respectively
- WC1, WC2 – The first and second place teams in the Wild Card, respectively

== First round ==
=== Eastern Conference first round ===
==== (A1) Montreal Canadiens vs. (WC1) New York Rangers ====
The Montreal Canadiens finished first in the Atlantic Division earning 103 points. The New York Rangers finished as the Eastern Conference's first wild-card, earning 102 points. This was the sixteenth playoff meeting between these two teams with New York winning eight of the fifteen previous series. They last met in the 2014 Eastern Conference final, which New York won in six games. Montreal won all three games in this year's regular-season series.

The Rangers eliminated the Canadiens in six games. In the first game of the series, Tanner Glass and Michael Grabner scored the only goals of the games as the Rangers won the game 2–0 on Henrik Lundqvist's 31-save shutout. In game two, the Canadiens tied the game with 18 seconds left, then in overtime, Alexander Radulov pushed it past the Rangers' goaltender to give Montreal a 4–3 victory. Radulov continued his scoring into game three, getting a goal and an assist to help the Canadiens achieve a 3–1 victory. The Rangers ended a six-game home-losing streak after game four, winning 2–1 over the Canadiens to tie the series 2–2. Mika Zibanejad got the overtime-winner for the Rangers in game five after Chris Kreider deflected a pass off of Canadiens defenceman Alexei Emelin, landing towards the forward who put it past goaltender Carey Price in a 3–2 win. Mats Zuccarello scored twice in game six as the Rangers eliminated the Canadiens in a 3–1 victory to advance to the second round.

| April 12 | New York Rangers | 2–0 | Montreal Canadiens | Centre Bell | Recap |
| Tanner Glass (1) – 09:50 | | First period | No scoring |
| No scoring | | Second period | No scoring |
| Michael Grabner (1) – en – 18:50 | | Third period | No scoring |
| Henrik Lundqvist 31 saves / 31 shots | | Goalie stats | Carey Price 29 saves / 30 shots |

| April 14 | New York Rangers | 3–4 | OT | Montreal Canadiens | Centre Bell | Recap |
| Michael Grabner (2) – 13:48 | | First period | | 04:05 – Jeff Petry (1); 15:42 – Paul Byron (1) |
| Rick Nash (1) – 09:58; Mats Zuccarello (1) – 14:47 | | Second period | | No scoring |
| No scoring | | Third period | | 19:42 – Tomas Plekanec (1) |
| No scoring | | First overtime period | | 18:34 – Alexander Radulov (1) |
| Henrik Lundqvist 54 saves / 58 shots | | Goalie stats | | Carey Price 35 saves / 38 shots |

| April 16 | Montreal Canadiens | 3–1 | New York Rangers | Madison Square Garden | Recap |
| No scoring | | First period | No scoring |
| Artturi Lehkonen (1) – pp – 17:37 | | Second period | No scoring |
| Shea Weber (1) – pp – 07:42; Alexander Radulov (2) – 15:35 | | Third period | 17:04 – Brady Skjei (1) |
| Carey Price 20 saves / 21 shots | | Goalie stats | Henrik Lundqvist 26 saves / 29 shots |

| April 18 | Montreal Canadiens | 1–2 | New York Rangers | Madison Square Garden | Recap |
| Torrey Mitchell (1) – 18:37 | | First period | 11:39 – Jesper Fast (1) |
| No scoring | | Second period | 04:28 – Rick Nash (2) |
| No scoring | | Third period | No scoring |
| Carey Price 30 saves / 32 shots | | Goalie stats | Henrik Lundqvist 23 saves / 24 shots |

| April 20 | New York Rangers | 3–2 | OT | Montreal Canadiens | Centre Bell | Recap |
| Jesper Fast (2) – sh – 15:56 | | First period | | 12:07 – Artturi Lehkonen (2); 16:20 – pp – Brendan Gallagher (1) |
| Brady Skjei (2) – 18:28 | | Second period | | No scoring |
| No scoring | | Third period | | No scoring |
| Mika Zibanejad (1) – 14:22 | | First overtime period | | No scoring |
| Henrik Lundqvist 34 saves / 36 shots | | Goalie stats | | Carey Price 33 saves / 36 shots |

| April 22 | Montreal Canadiens | 1–3 | New York Rangers | Madison Square Garden | Recap |
| Alexei Emelin (1) – 06:19 | | First period | No scoring |
| No scoring | | Second period | 02:26 – pp – Mats Zuccarello (2); 13:31 – Mats Zuccarello (3) |
| No scoring | | Third period | 19:42 – Derek Stepan - en - (1) |
| Carey Price 20 saves / 22 shots | | Goalie stats | Henrik Lundqvist 27 saves / 28 shots |

| New York won series 4–2 |

==== (A2) Ottawa Senators vs. (A3) Boston Bruins ====
The Ottawa Senators finished second in the Atlantic Division, earning 98 points. The Boston Bruins earned 95 points in the regular season to finish third in the Atlantic. This was the first playoff meeting between the contemporary Ottawa franchise and Boston, and the first Boston-Ottawa series since the 1927 Stanley Cup Finals. Ottawa won all four games in this year's regular season series.

The Senators eliminated the Bruins in six games. In the first game, the Senators gained a 1–0 lead into the third on Bobby Ryan's goal in the second period, however, the Bruins scored twice in the final period with Brad Marchand having the final tally 2:33 before the game ended 2–1 for Boston. In game two, Ottawa came back from a two-goal deficit in the third period and won via Dion Phaneuf whose goal in overtime helped tie the series 1–1 after a 4–3 conquest. In game three, Ottawa had a three-goal lead with Mike Hoffman scoring twice, but the Bruins came back with three goals in the third period. In overtime, Bruins forward Riley Nash took a roughing penalty and on the ensuing power play, Bobby Ryan tipped in a pass from Kyle Turris ending the game 4–3 for the Senators. Bobby Ryan scored the only goal in game four, at the 5:49 mark of the third period, allowing the Senators to achieve a 3–1 series lead. Boston came back from an early 2–0 deficit in game five and the game would go to overtime. In double-overtime, Bruins rookie Sean Kuraly scored his second goal of the game, completing the comeback in a 3–2 feat. In game six, Clarke MacArthur scored the series-winning goal on the power play in overtime for Ottawa to advance to the second round.

| April 12 | Boston Bruins | 2–1 | Ottawa Senators | Canadian Tire Centre | Recap |
| No scoring | | First period | No scoring |
| No scoring | | Second period | 10:28 – Bobby Ryan (1) |
| Frank Vatrano (1) – 04:55; Brad Marchand (1) – 17:27 | | Third period | No scoring |
| Tuukka Rask 26 saves / 27 shots | | Goalie stats | Craig Anderson 23 saves / 25 shots |

| April 15 | Boston Bruins | 3–4 | OT | Ottawa Senators | Canadian Tire Centre | Recap |
| No scoring | | First period | | No scoring |
| Drew Stafford (1) – 09:47; Tim Schaller (1) – sh – 12:39; Patrice Bergeron (1) – pp – 16:01 | | Second period | | 10:57 – pp – Clarke MacArthur (1) |
| No scoring | | Third period | | 05:28 – Chris Wideman (1); 07:48 – Derick Brassard (1) |
| No scoring | | First overtime period | | 01:59 – Dion Phaneuf (1) |
| Tuukka Rask 25 saves / 29 shots | | Goalie stats | | Craig Anderson 26 saves / 29 shots |

| April 17 | Ottawa Senators | 4–3 | OT | Boston Bruins | TD Garden | Recap |
| Mike Hoffman (1) – 07:15; Derick Brassard (2) – 07:40 | | First period | | No scoring |
| Mike Hoffman (2) – pp – 03:42 | | Second period | | 06:05 – Noel Acciari (1); 06:47 – David Backes (1); 13:51 – pp – David Pastrnak (1) |
| No scoring | | Third period | | No scoring |
| Bobby Ryan (2) – pp – 05:43 | | First overtime period | | No scoring |
| Craig Anderson 17 saves / 20 shots | | Goalie stats | | Tuukka Rask 28 saves / 32 shots |

| April 19 | Ottawa Senators | 1–0 | Boston Bruins | TD Garden | Recap |
| No scoring | | First period | No scoring |
| No scoring | | Second period | No scoring |
| Bobby Ryan (3) – 05:49 | | Third period | No scoring |
| Craig Anderson 22 saves / 22 shots | | Goalie stats | Tuukka Rask 26 saves / 27 shots |

| April 21 | Boston Bruins | 3–2 | 2OT | Ottawa Senators | Canadian Tire Centre | Recap |
| No scoring | | First period | | 11:19 – Mark Stone (1) |
| David Pastrnak (2) – 08:40; Sean Kuraly (1) – 17:05 | | Second period | | 00:30 – Jean-Gabriel Pageau (1) |
| No scoring | | Third period | | No scoring |
| Sean Kuraly (2) – 10:19 | | Second overtime period | | No scoring |
| Tuukka Rask 41 saves / 43 shots | | Goalie stats | | Craig Anderson 36 saves / 39 shots |

| April 23 | Ottawa Senators | 3–2 | OT | Boston Bruins | TD Garden | Recap |
| No scoring | | First period | | 18:13 – pp – Drew Stafford (2) |
| Bobby Ryan (4) – pp – 03:26; Kyle Turris (1) – 08:32 | | Second period | | No scoring |
| No scoring | | Third period | | 01:57 – Patrice Bergeron (1) |
| Clarke MacArthur (2) – pp – 06:30 | | First overtime period | | No scoring |
| Craig Anderson 28 saves / 30 shots | | Goalie stats | | Tuukka Rask 26 saves / 29 shots |

| Ottawa won series 4–2 |

==== (M1) Washington Capitals vs. (WC2) Toronto Maple Leafs ====
The Washington Capitals earned the Presidents' Trophy for the second consecutive year as the NHL's best regular season team this time with 118 points. The Toronto Maple Leafs finished as the Eastern Conference's second wild-card, earning 95 points. This was the first playoff meeting between these two teams. Washington won two of the three games in this year's regular season series.

This became only the third playoff series in NHL history in which five games were decided in overtime (the first being the 1951 Stanley Cup Finals between the Toronto Maple Leafs and the Montreal Canadiens and the second occurring in the 2012 Western Conference quarterfinals between the Phoenix Coyotes and the Chicago Blackhawks).

The Capitals defeated the Maple Leafs in six games. Although Toronto had a two-goal lead in the first ten minutes of the first game, Washington scored two goals, both from Justin Williams, and won the game 3–2 in overtime from Tom Wilson's goal. In game two, rookie Kasperi Kapanen scored twice including the game-winner in double-overtime leading the Maple Leafs to a 4–3 victory. Washington took two two-goal leads in game three; the first pick in the 2016 NHL Draft, Auston Matthews, helped soften the lead with his first playoff goal, but after the Capitals got a 3–1 lead, the Maple Leafs scored twice to tie the game. Then in overtime, Tyler Bozak tipped a shot past the Capitals' goaltender to give the Leafs a 2–1 series lead. Game four was the only game of the series not to go into overtime; Tom Wilson and T. J. Oshie both scored two goals and Oshie's second goal proved to be the game-winner in a 5–4 victory after an attempted comeback by Toronto was thwarted. Game five featured the fourth overtime game of this series with Justin Williams scoring for Capitals in a 2–1, taking a 3–2 series lead in the process. In game six, the game went to overtime for the fifth time this series and at 6:31 of the first overtime period Marcus Johansson scored his second goal for the Capitals in a 2–1 victory and another trip to the second round.

| April 13 | Toronto Maple Leafs | 2–3 | OT | Washington Capitals | Verizon Center | Recap |
| Mitch Marner (1) – 01:35; Jake Gardiner (1) – 09:44 | | First period | | 12:24 – pp – Justin Williams (1) |
| No scoring | | Second period | | 16:00 – Justin Williams (2) |
| No scoring | | Third period | | No scoring |
| No scoring | | First overtime period | | 05:15 – Tom Wilson (1) |
| Frederik Andersen 41 saves / 44 shots | | Goalie stats | | Braden Holtby 35 saves / 37 shots |

| April 15 | Toronto Maple Leafs | 4–3 | 2OT | Washington Capitals | Verizon Center | Recap |
| James van Riemsdyk (1) – 17:34 | | First period | | No scoring |
| Kasperi Kapanen (1) – 14:25; Morgan Rielly (1) – pp – 19:46 | | Second period | | 03:47 – pp – Alexander Ovechkin (1); 11:06 – pp – John Carlson (1) |
| No scoring | | Third period | | 12:39 – Nicklas Backstrom (1) |
| Kasperi Kapanen (2) – 11:53 | | Second overtime period | | No scoring |
| Frederik Andersen 47 saves / 50 shots | | Goalie stats | | Braden Holtby 47 saves / 51 shots |

| April 17 | Washington Capitals | 3–4 | OT | Toronto Maple Leafs | Air Canada Centre | Recap |
| Nicklas Backstrom (2) – 02:43; Alexander Ovechkin (2) – 04:49 | | First period | | 14:08 – Auston Matthews (1) |
| Evgeny Kuznetsov (1) – 05:39 | | Second period | | 15:13 – Nazem Kadri (1); 19:20 – William Nylander (1) |
| No scoring | | Third period | | No scoring |
| No scoring | | First overtime period | | 01:37 – pp – Tyler Bozak (1) |
| Braden Holtby 24 saves / 28 shots | | Goalie stats | | Frederik Andersen 23 saves / 26 shots |

| April 19 | Washington Capitals | 5–4 | Toronto Maple Leafs | Air Canada Centre | Recap |
| T. J. Oshie (1) – 02:58; Alexander Ovechkin (3) – pp – 04:34; Tom Wilson (2) – 13:41; Tom Wilson (3) – 16:04 | | First period | 05:16 – Zach Hyman (1) |
| No scoring | | Second period | 05:39 – pp – James van Riemsdyk (2) |
| T. J. Oshie (2) – 12:59 | | Third period | 12:00 – Auston Matthews (2); 19:33 – Tyler Bozak (2) |
| Braden Holtby 30 saves / 34 shots | | Goalie stats | Frederik Andersen 22 saves / 27 shots |

| April 21 | Toronto Maple Leafs | 1–2 | OT | Washington Capitals | Verizon Center | Recap |
| No scoring | | First period | | 18:15 – pp – T. J. Oshie (3) |
| Auston Matthews (3) – 06:00 | | Second period | | No scoring |
| No scoring | | Third period | | No scoring |
| No scoring | | First overtime period | | 01:04 – Justin Williams (3) |
| Frederik Andersen 26 saves / 28 shots | | Goalie stats | | Braden Holtby 24 saves / 25 shots |

| April 23 | Washington Capitals | 2–1 | OT | Toronto Maple Leafs | Air Canada Centre | Recap |
| No scoring | | First period | | No scoring |
| No scoring | | Second period | | No scoring |
| Marcus Johansson (1) – 12:49 | | Third period | | 07:45 – Auston Matthews (4) |
| Marcus Johansson (2) – 06:31 | | First overtime period | | No scoring |
| Braden Holtby 37 saves / 38 shots | | Goalie stats | | Frederik Andersen 34 saves / 36 shots |

| Washington won series 4–2 |

==== (M2) Pittsburgh Penguins vs. (M3) Columbus Blue Jackets ====
The Pittsburgh Penguins finished second in the Metropolitan Division earning 111 points. The Columbus Blue Jackets earned 108 points to finish third in the Metropolitan. This was the second playoff meeting between these teams; they last met in the 2014 Eastern Conference first round, which Pittsburgh won in six games. The teams split this year's four-game regular season series.

The Penguins defeated the Blue Jackets in five games. Before game one began, Matt Murray, the starting goaltender for the Penguins, injured himself during warm-ups forcing Marc-Andre Fleury, who had been demoted to the backup for the season, to start the game; his team would win the game 3–1, making 31 saves in the process. Sidney Crosby got a goal and two assists in game two as the Penguins defeated the Blue Jackets 4–1 and took a 2–0 series lead. In game three, Jake Guentzel scored a hat-trick, his third being the overtime-winner as the Penguins came back from a two-goal deficit and defeated the Blue Jackets 5–4 and take a 3–0 series lead. Columbus avoided a sweep in game four, scoring with five different players in a 5–4 victory; this was also the franchise's first playoff win in regulation. In game five, Bryan Rust scored twice, including the series-winner, and Fleury made 49 saves in a 5–2 win for the Penguins to advance to the second round.

| April 12 | Columbus Blue Jackets | 1–3 | Pittsburgh Penguins | PPG Paints Arena | Recap |
| No scoring | | First period | No scoring |
| No scoring | | Second period | 01:15 – Bryan Rust (1); 03:35 – pp – Phil Kessel (1); 16:25 – Nick Bonino (1) |
| Matt Calvert (1) – 12:41 | | Third period | No scoring |
| Sergei Bobrovsky 26 saves / 29 shots | | Goalie stats | Marc-Andre Fleury 31 saves / 32 shots |

| April 14 | Columbus Blue Jackets | 1–4 | Pittsburgh Penguins | PPG Paints Arena | Recap |
| No scoring | | First period | 08:31 – Sidney Crosby (1) |
| Brandon Saad (1) – 07:00 | | Second period | 07:51 – Jake Guentzel (1) |
| No scoring | | Third period | 02:01 – Evgeni Malkin (1); 19:14 – en – Patric Hornqvist (1) |
| Sergei Bobrovsky 28 saves / 31 shots | | Goalie stats | Marc-Andre Fleury 39 saves / 40 shots |

| April 16 | Pittsburgh Penguins | 5–4 | OT | Columbus Blue Jackets | Nationwide Arena | Recap |
| Jake Guentzel (2) – 03:17 | | First period | | 00:11 – Cam Atkinson (1); 05:02 – Cam Atkinson (2); 06:10 – pp – Zach Werenski (1) |
| Bryan Rust (2) – 05:21; Evgeni Malkin (2) – 13:25 | | Second period | | No scoring |
| Jake Guentzel (3) – pp – 11:48 | | Third period | | 15:11 – Brandon Dubinsky (1) |
| Jake Guentzel (4) – 13:10 | | First overtime period | | No scoring |
| Marc-Andre Fleury 33 saves / 37 shots | | Goalie stats | | Sergei Bobrovsky 42 saves / 47 shots |

| April 18 | Pittsburgh Penguins | 4–5 | Columbus Blue Jackets | Nationwide Arena | Recap |
| No scoring | | First period | 11:46 – Jack Johnson (1); 18:56 – Josh Anderson (1) |
| Patric Hornqvist (2) – pp – 06:43; Ron Hainsey (1) – 16:24 | | Second period | 04:48 – Markus Nutivaara (1) |
| Tom Kuhnhackl (1) – 02:10; Jake Guentzel (5) – sh – 19:32 | | Third period | 00:27 – William Karlsson (1); 05:37 – Boone Jenner (1) |
| Marc-Andre Fleury 29 saves / 34 shots | | Goalie stats | Sergei Bobrovsky 27 saves / 31 shots |

| April 20 | Columbus Blue Jackets | 2–5 | Pittsburgh Penguins | PPG Paints Arena | Recap |
| No scoring | | First period | 09:07 – pp – Phil Kessel (2) |
| William Karlsson (2) – 09:30; Boone Jenner (2) – pp – 12:24 | | Second period | 01:07 – Bryan Rust (3); 03:50 – Bryan Rust (4) |
| No scoring | | Third period | 05:31 – pp – Sidney Crosby (2); 06:22 – Scott Wilson (1) |
| Sergei Bobrovsky 27 saves / 32 shots | | Goalie stats | Marc-Andre Fleury 49 saves / 51 shots |

| Pittsburgh won series 4–1 |

=== Western Conference first round ===
==== (C1) Chicago Blackhawks vs. (WC2) Nashville Predators ====
The Chicago Blackhawks finished first in the Central Division earning 109 points. The Nashville Predators finished as the Western Conference's second wild-card, earning 94 points. This was the third playoff meeting between these teams with Chicago winning both previous series. They last met in the 2015 Western Conference first round, which Chicago won in six games. Chicago won four of the five games in this year's regular season series.

The Predators defeated the Blackhawks in a four-game sweep; this was the first time since 1993 that an eighth-seeded team swept a playoff series against the top seed in their conference. Viktor Arvidsson scored the only goal in game one as the Predators shut out the Blackhawks, stopping all 29 shots they faced. The Blackhawks remained scoreless after game two, instead being outscored 5–0 with Pekka Rinne not only stopping all 30 shots he faced, but also providing two assists. Chicago finally scored a goal in game three and they maintained a two-goal lead throughout the second period, but in the third period, Filip Forsberg scored twice for Nashville to tie the game and send it to overtime. In overtime, Nashville forward Kevin Fiala skated around Chicago goalie Corey Crawford and put the puck past the Chicago netminder to complete the comeback in a 3–2 victory giving them their first 3–0 series lead. In game four, Roman Josi scored twice in a 4–1 victory and Rinne made 30 saves for the Predators, who swept a playoff opponent for the first time in franchise history.

| April 13 | Nashville Predators | 1–0 | Chicago Blackhawks | United Center | Recap |
| Viktor Arvidsson (1) – 07:52 | | First period | No scoring |
| No scoring | | Second period | No scoring |
| No scoring | | Third period | No scoring |
| Pekka Rinne 29 saves / 29 shots | | Goalie stats | Corey Crawford 19 saves / 20 shots |

| April 15 | Nashville Predators | 5–0 | Chicago Blackhawks | United Center | Recap |
| Ryan Ellis (1) – 03:44 | | First period | No scoring |
| Harry Zolnierczyk (1) – 02:51; Colton Sissons (1) – 13:00 | | Second period | No scoring |
| Ryan Johansen (1) – 13:46; Kevin Fiala (1) – pp – 18:13 | | Third period | No scoring |
| Pekka Rinne 30 saves / 30 shots | | Goalie stats | Corey Crawford 24 saves / 29 shots |

| April 17 | Chicago Blackhawks | 2–3 | OT | Nashville Predators | Bridgestone Arena | Recap |
| No scoring | | First period | | No scoring |
| Dennis Rasmussen (1) – 01:05; Patrick Kane (1) – pp – 11:15 | | Second period | | No scoring |
| No scoring | | Third period | | 04:24 – Filip Forsberg (1); 14:08 – Filip Forsberg (2) |
| No scoring | | First overtime period | | 16:44 – Kevin Fiala (2) |
| Corey Crawford 46 saves / 49 shots | | Goalie stats | | Pekka Rinne 34 saves / 36 shots |

| April 20 | Chicago Blackhawks | 1–4 | Nashville Predators | Bridgestone Arena | Recap |
| No scoring | | First period | No scoring |
| No scoring | | Second period | 09:41 – Roman Josi (1) |
| Jonathan Toews (1) – pp – 14:42 | | Third period | 08:52 – Colton Sissons (2); 10:21 – Roman Josi (2); 18:12 – en – Viktor Arvidsson (2) |
| Corey Crawford 22 saves / 25 shots | | Goalie stats | Pekka Rinne 30 saves / 31 shots |

| Nashville won series 4–0 |

==== (C2) Minnesota Wild vs. (C3) St. Louis Blues ====
The Minnesota Wild finished second in the Central Division earning 106 points. The St. Louis Blues earned 99 points to finish third in the Central. This was the second playoff meeting between these teams; their only previous meeting was the 2015 Western Conference first round, which Minnesota won in six games. St. Louis won three of the five games in this year's regular season series.

The Blues defeated the Wild in five games. St. Louis won the first game of the series 2–1 17:48 into overtime from Joel Edmundson's wrist shot after the Wild tied the game in the final minute of the game, Jake Allen made 51 saves in the process. In game two, Jaden Schwartz scored the game-winner with 2:27 left in the third period, giving the Blues another 2–1 victory over the Wild. The Wild continued to score only one goal in each game this series, losing the game nevertheless, this time 3–1 as Allen made 40 saves and the Blues took a 3–0 series lead. Devan Dubnyk kept the Wild alive in the series, stopping all 28 shots he faced in a 2–0 victory in game four. In game five, the Blues took a 3–1 lead in the third period only to see the Wild tie it up in the last ten minutes. However, in overtime, Magnus Paajarvi ended the game for St. Louis, defeating the Wild 4–3 to advance to the second round.

| April 12 | St. Louis Blues | 2–1 | OT | Minnesota Wild | Xcel Energy Center | Recap |
| No scoring | | First period | | No scoring |
| Vladimir Sobotka (1) – 06:21 | | Second period | | No scoring |
| No scoring | | Third period | | 19:37 – Zach Parise (1) |
| Joel Edmundson (1) – 17:48 | | First overtime period | | No scoring |
| Jake Allen 51 saves / 52 shots | | Goalie stats | | Devan Dubnyk 24 saves / 26 shots |

| April 14 | St. Louis Blues | 2–1 | Minnesota Wild | Xcel Energy Center | Recap |
| No scoring | | First period | No scoring |
| Joel Edmundson (2) – 03:51 | | Second period | 17:44 – pp – Zach Parise (2) |
| Jaden Schwartz (1) – 17:33 | | Third period | No scoring |
| Jake Allen 21 saves / 22 shots | | Goalie stats | Devan Dubnyk 22 saves / 24 shots |

| April 16 | Minnesota Wild | 1–3 | St. Louis Blues | Scottrade Center | Recap |
| No scoring | | First period | 03:25 – Colton Parayko (1) |
| Charlie Coyle (1) – 12:59 | | Second period | 15:19 – pp – Jaden Schwartz (2) |
| No scoring | | Third period | 18:49 – en – Alexander Steen (1) |
| Devan Dubnyk 28 saves / 30 shots | | Goalie stats | Jake Allen 40 saves / 41 shots |

| April 19 | Minnesota Wild | 2–0 | St. Louis Blues | Scottrade Center | Recap |
| Charlie Coyle (2) – 16:50 | | First period | No scoring |
| Martin Hanzal (1) – 16:41 | | Second period | No scoring |
| No scoring | | Third period | No scoring |
| Devan Dubnyk 28 saves / 28 shots | | Goalie stats | Jake Allen 26 saves / 28 shots |

| April 22 | St. Louis Blues | 4–3 | OT | Minnesota Wild | Xcel Energy Center | Recap |
| Vladimir Tarasenko (1) – 07:16; Alexander Steen (2) – 10:31 | | First period | | 18:31 – pp – Ryan Suter (1) |
| No scoring | | Second period | | No scoring |
| Paul Stastny (1) – 07:23 | | Third period | | 10:38 – pp – Mikko Koivu (1); 14:59 – Jason Zucker (1) |
| Magnus Paajarvi (1) – 09:42 | | First overtime period | | No scoring |
| Jake Allen 34 saves / 37 shots | | Goalie stats | | Devan Dubnyk 23 saves / 27 shots |

| St. Louis won series 4–1 |

==== (P1) Anaheim Ducks vs. (WC1) Calgary Flames ====
The Anaheim Ducks finished first in the Pacific Division for the fifth consecutive year, this time earning 105 points. The Calgary Flames finished as the Western Conference's first wild-card, earning 94 points. This was the third playoff meeting between these teams with Anaheim winning both previous series. They last met in the 2015 Western Conference second round which Anaheim won in five games. Anaheim won four of the five games in this year's regular season series. Anaheim has also won 25 straight regular-season home games against Calgary.

The Ducks defeated the Flames in a four-game sweep. In game one, both Ryan Getzlaf and Jakob Silfverberg had a goal and an assist, the latter of whom had the game-winning goal in a 3–2 victory for the Ducks. Anaheim continued their home-dominance over Calgary defeating the Flames 3–2 with a goal and an assist by Getzlaf again. The Flames had a lead of 4–1 in game three, forcing Ducks goaltender John Gibson to be replaced by Jonathan Bernier. The Ducks came back in this game, scoring three times, in what would become the fourth overtime game of this night. Corey Perry then threw the puck towards the net and it bounced off both Calgary goaltender Brian Elliott and defenceman Michael Stone and into the net, to give the Ducks a 3–0 series lead. In game four, Gibson stopped 36 shots by the Flames, but allowed only one goal as the Ducks ended the series with a 3–1 win.

| April 13 | Calgary Flames | 2–3 | Anaheim Ducks | Honda Center | Recap |
| Sean Monahan (1) – pp – 08:43 | | First period | 00:52 – pp – Ryan Getzlaf (1) |
| Sam Bennett (1) – 09:46 | | Second period | 13:53 – Rickard Rakell (1); 17:47 – pp – Jakob Silfverberg (1) |
| No scoring | | Third period | No scoring |
| Brian Elliott 38 saves / 41 shots | | Goalie stats | John Gibson 30 saves / 32 shots |

| April 15 | Calgary Flames | 2–3 | Anaheim Ducks | Honda Center | Recap |
| Mikael Backlund (1) – sh – 18:24 | | First period | 03:21 – Jakob Silfverberg (2); 06:44 – Rickard Rakell (2) |
| Sean Monahan (2) – pp – 07:01 | | Second period | No scoring |
| No scoring | | Third period | 15:14 – pp – Ryan Getzlaf (2) |
| Brian Elliott 26 saves / 29 shots | | Goalie stats | John Gibson 35 saves / 37 shots |

| April 17 | Anaheim Ducks | 5–4 | OT | Calgary Flames | Scotiabank Saddledome | Recap |
| Nick Ritchie (1) – 15:33 | | First period | | 02:10 – pp – Sean Monahan (3); 09:18 – pp – Kris Versteeg (1) |
| Shea Theodore (1) – 19:11 | | Second period | | 04:34 – Michael Stone (1); 08:33 – pp – Sam Bennett (2) |
| Nate Thompson (1) – 11:14; Shea Theodore (2) – 15:39 | | Third period | | No scoring |
| Corey Perry (1) – 01:30 | | First overtime period | | No scoring |
| John Gibson 12 saves / 16 shots Jonathan Bernier 16 saves / 16 shots | | Goalie stats | | Brian Elliott 22 saves / 27 shots |

| April 19 | Anaheim Ducks | 3–1 | Calgary Flames | Scotiabank Saddledome | Recap |
| Patrick Eaves (1) – 05:38; Nate Thompson (2) – 06:46 | | First period | No scoring |
| No scoring | | Second period | 16:07 – pp – Sean Monahan (4) |
| Ryan Getzlaf (3) – en – 19:53 | | Third period | No scoring |
| John Gibson 36 saves / 37 shots | | Goalie stats | Brian Elliott 2 saves / 3 shots Chad Johnson 20 saves / 21 shots |

| Anaheim won series 4–0 |

==== (P2) Edmonton Oilers vs. (P3) San Jose Sharks ====
The Edmonton Oilers finished second in the Pacific Division with 103 points. The San Jose Sharks earned 99 points in the regular season to finish third in the Pacific. Edmonton started a playoff series at home for the first time since the 1991 Campbell Conference final. This was the second playoff meeting between these teams; their only previous series was the 2006 Western Conference semifinals, which Edmonton won in six games. Edmonton won three of the five games in this year's regular season series.

The Oilers defeated the Sharks in six games. In Edmonton's first playoff game since 2006, the Oilers took a 2–0 lead in the first period, but the Sharks scored three goals over the second, third, and first overtime period winning the game 3–2 from Melker Karlsson's goal. The Oilers scored two shorthanded goals in game two as they blanked San Jose 2–0. The shutout streak continued in game three, as Zack Kassian scored the only goal for the Oilers and Cam Talbot stopped 23 shots. Logan Couture and Joe Pavelski scored two goals each and Martin Jones stopped all 23 shots as the Sharks blanked the Oilers 7–0 in game four to tie the series at two. The Sharks gained a 3–1 lead over the Oilers in game five, but both Mark Letestu and Oscar Klefbom scored to tie the game and send it to overtime. David Desharnais would end it at 18:15 of overtime to give the Oilers a 4–3 triumph and a 3–2 series lead. In game six, the Oilers scored twice in the second period, both on breakaways, and closed out the series with a 3–1 win.

| April 12 | San Jose Sharks | 3–2 | OT | Edmonton Oilers | Rogers Place | Recap |
| No scoring | | First period | | 06:44 – Oscar Klefbom (1); 17:07 – pp – Milan Lucic (1) |
| Joel Ward (1) – pp – 01:43 | | Second period | | No scoring |
| Paul Martin (1) – 05:22 | | Third period | | No scoring |
| Melker Karlsson (1) – 03:22 | | First overtime period | | No scoring |
| Martin Jones 17 saves / 19 shots | | Goalie stats | | Cam Talbot 41 saves / 44 shots |

| April 14 | San Jose Sharks | 0–2 | Edmonton Oilers | Rogers Place | Recap |
| No scoring | | First period | No scoring |
| No scoring | | Second period | 00:42 – sh – Zack Kassian (1) |
| No scoring | | Third period | 10:31 – sh – Connor McDavid (1) |
| Martin Jones 34 saves / 36 shots | | Goalie stats | Cam Talbot 16 saves / 16 shots |

| April 16 | Edmonton Oilers | 1–0 | San Jose Sharks | SAP Center | Recap |
| No scoring | | First period | No scoring |
| No scoring | | Second period | No scoring |
| Zack Kassian (2) – 10:45 | | Third period | No scoring |
| Cam Talbot 22 saves / 22 shots | | Goalie stats | Martin Jones 21 saves / 22 shots |

| April 18 | Edmonton Oilers | 0–7 | San Jose Sharks | SAP Center | Recap |
| No scoring | | First period | 00:15 – Joe Pavelski (1); 11:02 – pp – Logan Couture (1) |
| No scoring | | Second period | 02:02 – pp – Patrick Marleau (1); 09:46 – Marcus Sorensen (1); 12:52 – Logan Couture (2); 16:46 – pp – Joe Pavelski (2) |
| No scoring | | Third period | 06:45 – pp – David Schlemko (1) |
| Cam Talbot 19 saves / 24 shots Laurent Brossoit 6 saves / 8 shots | | Goalie stats | Martin Jones 23 saves / 23 shots |

| April 20 | San Jose Sharks | 3–4 | OT | Edmonton Oilers | Rogers Place | Recap |
| Mikkel Boedker (1) – 10:12; Patrick Marleau (2) – 15:52 | | First period | | 05:28 – Patrick Maroon (1) |
| David Schlemko (2) – 08:58 | | Second period | | 18:33 – pp – Mark Letestu (1) |
| No scoring | | Third period | | 17:14 – Oscar Klefbom (2) |
| No scoring | | First overtime period | | 18:15 – David Desharnais (1) |
| Martin Jones 44 saves / 48 shots | | Goalie stats | | Cam Talbot 27 saves / 30 shots |

| April 22 | Edmonton Oilers | 3–1 | San Jose Sharks | SAP Center | Recap |
| No scoring | | First period | No scoring |
| Leon Draisaitl (1) – 00:54; Anton Slepyshev (1) – 01:50 | | Second period | No scoring |
| Connor McDavid (2) – en – 19:59 | | Third period | 12:12 – Patrick Marleau (3) |
| Cam Talbot 27 saves / 28 shots | | Goalie stats | Martin Jones 18 saves / 20 shots |

| Edmonton won series 4–2 |

== Second round ==
=== Eastern Conference second round ===
==== (A2) Ottawa Senators vs. (WC1) New York Rangers ====
This was the second playoff meeting between these two teams; their only previous series was in the 2012 Eastern Conference quarterfinals, which New York won in seven games. This was the second time under the current playoff format and the second year in a row in which a wild-card team had more points than its opponent during the regular season but did not have home ice advantage; the other time was the Tampa Bay Lightning and the New York Islanders in the previous year's Eastern Conference second round. Ottawa won two of the three games in this year's regular season series.

The Senators defeated the Rangers in six games. In the first game, goaltender Craig Anderson made 34 saves in a 2–1 victory for the Senators. The Rangers had leads of 3–1, 4–2, and 5–3 in game two only to have the Senators tie up the game on Jean-Gabriel Pageau's hat-trick goal with 1:02 remaining. In double-overtime, Pageau's fourth goal of the game gave the Senators a 6–5 win and a 2–0 series lead. In doing this, he became the first player to score four goals in a playoff game since Johan Franzen scored four goals for the Detroit Red Wings in game four of their 2010 second round series against the San Jose Sharks. Mats Zuccarello had a goal and an assist in game three as the Rangers won the affair 4–1. The Rangers defeated the Senators 4–1 again in game four, tying the series 2–2; Oscar Lindberg scored twice in the victory. The Rangers got an early two-goal lead in game five, but the Senators came back scoring three goals in return. The Rangers regained the lead, but former Ranger Derick Brassard tied the game in the final minutes to send it to overtime. Kyle Turris ended the game 6:28 into overtime to give the Senators a 5–4 victory and a 3–2 series lead. In game six, Erik Karlsson netted the series-winning goal and added an assist for the Senators who advanced to the conference finals for the first time in ten years after a 4–2 victory.

| April 27 | New York Rangers | 1–2 | Ottawa Senators | Canadian Tire Centre | Recap |
| No scoring | | First period | No scoring |
| Ryan McDonagh (1) – pp – 07:10 | | Second period | 18:39 – pp – Ryan Dzingel (1) |
| No scoring | | Third period | 15:49 – Erik Karlsson (1) |
| Henrik Lundqvist 41 saves / 43 shots | | Goalie stats | Craig Anderson 34 saves / 35 shots |

| April 29 | New York Rangers | 5–6 | 2OT | Ottawa Senators | Canadian Tire Centre | Recap |
| Michael Grabner (3) – sh – 04:16 | | First period | | 13:59 – Jean-Gabriel Pageau (2) |
| Chris Kreider (1) – 10:39; Derek Stepan (2) – sh – 13:10; Brady Skjei (3) – 15:51 | | Second period | | 14:00 – Marc Methot (1) |
| Brady Skjei (4) – 05:10 | | Third period | | 01:28 – Mark Stone (2); 16:41 – Jean-Gabriel Pageau (3); 18:58 – Jean-Gabriel Pageau (4) |
| No scoring | | Second overtime period | | 02:54 – Jean-Gabriel Pageau (5) |
| Henrik Lundqvist 28 saves / 34 shots | | Goalie stats | | Craig Anderson 43 saves / 48 shots |

| May 2 | Ottawa Senators | 1–4 | New York Rangers | Madison Square Garden | Recap |
| No scoring | | First period | 05:31 – Mats Zuccarello (4); 13:24 – Michael Grabner (4) |
| Jean-Gabriel Pageau (6) – 18:49 | | Second period | 12:21 – Rick Nash (3); 18:17 – Oscar Lindberg (1) |
| No scoring | | Third period | No scoring |
| Craig Anderson 26 saves / 30 shots | | Goalie stats | Henrik Lundqvist 26 saves / 27 shots |

| May 4 | Ottawa Senators | 1–4 | New York Rangers | Madison Square Garden | Recap |
| No scoring | | First period | 14:04 – Nick Holden (1) |
| No scoring | | Second period | 02:01 – Oscar Lindberg (2); 15:54 – Oscar Lindberg (3) |
| Kyle Turris (2) – 13:34 | | Third period | 10:45 – pp – Chris Kreider (2) |
| Craig Anderson 17 saves / 20 shots Mike Condon 9 saves / 10 shots | | Goalie stats | Henrik Lundqvist 22 saves / 23 shots |

| May 6 | New York Rangers | 4–5 | OT | Ottawa Senators | Canadian Tire Centre | Recap |
| Jesper Fast (3) – 04:07; Nick Holden (2) – 05:13 | | First period | | 06:03 – Mark Stone (3) |
| Ryan McDonagh (2) – 17:49 | | Second period | | 08:17 – Mike Hoffman (3); 08:50 – Tom Pyatt (1) |
| Jimmy Vesey (1) – 12:48 | | Third period | | 18:34 – Derick Brassard (3) |
| No scoring | | First overtime period | | 06:28 – Kyle Turris (3) |
| Henrik Lundqvist 32 saves / 37 shots | | Goalie stats | | Craig Anderson 29 saves / 33 shots |

| May 9 | Ottawa Senators | 4–2 | New York Rangers | Madison Square Garden | Recap |
| Mike Hoffman (4) – 04:27; Mark Stone (4) – 14:44 | | First period | No scoring |
| Erik Karlsson (2) – 15:53 | | Second period | 13:32 – Mika Zibanejad (2) |
| Jean-Gabriel Pageau (7) – en – 19:53 | | Third period | 00:53 – Chris Kreider (3) |
| Craig Anderson 37 saves / 39 shots | | Goalie stats | Henrik Lundqvist 22 saves / 25 shots |

| Ottawa won series 4–2 |

==== (M1) Washington Capitals vs. (M2) Pittsburgh Penguins ====
Bryan Rust of the Pittsburgh Penguins scores the series-winning goal in Game 7 of the Eastern Conference second round

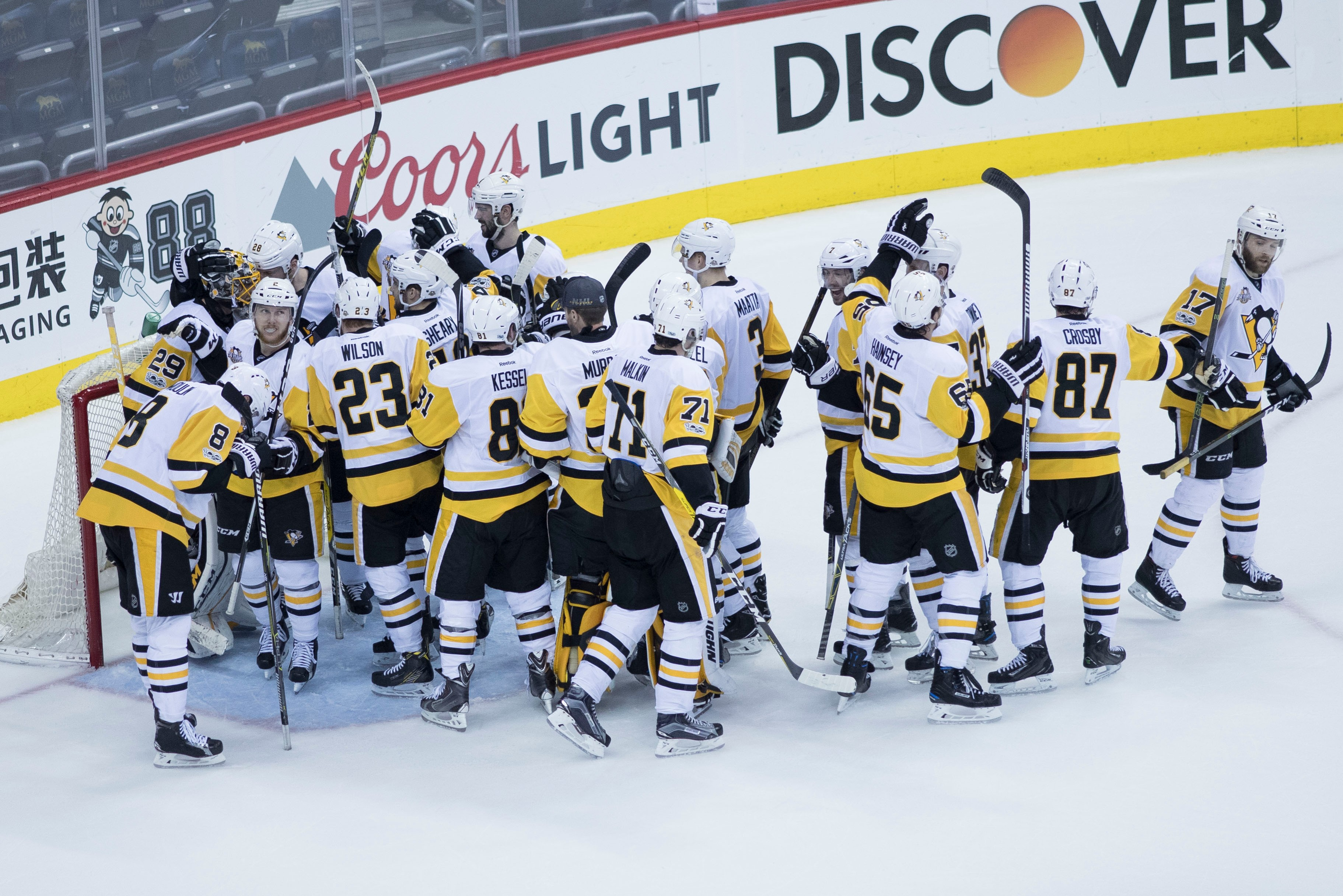
The Penguins celebrate after winning game seven of their series against the Washington Capitals.

This was the tenth playoff meeting between these teams and the second consecutive in the second round. Pittsburgh had won eight of the nine previous series including the previous year's confrontation which ended in six games. These teams split their four-game regular season series.

The Penguins defeated the Capitals in seven games after they gave up a 3–1 series lead. In the final eight minutes of game one, Nick Bonino scored the game-winning goal as the Penguins once led 2–0 only to have Washington score twice to tie the game, then with 8:24 left in the third period Bonino gave the Penguins a 3–2 lead and thus the victory. Phil Kessel and Jake Guentzel both scored twice for the Penguins in a 6–2 victory, gaining a 2–0 series lead as a result. The Capitals got an early 1–0 lead in game three, then a goal by Evgeny Kuznetsov put them up by two goals, however, in the final two minutes of the game, the Penguins tied the score 2–2. In overtime, Trevor Daley of the Penguins was penalized for holding and on the ensuing power play, Kevin Shattenkirk scored to give the Capitals a 3–2 victory. Pittsburgh lead 2–0 in game four only to have Washington tie the game, however, 2:49 after Nate Schmidt tied the game for Washington, Justin Schultz on the power play gave the Penguins a 3–2 lead and the victory. Washington scored three times in the third period of game five after being down one goal to win 4–2. Andre Burakovsky scored twice in game six, forcing a seventh game in Washington's 5–2 triumph. In game seven, Marc-Andre Fleury stopped all 29 shots and Bryan Rust scored the series-winning goal to defeat the Capitals 2–0 and advance to the conference finals for the second consecutive year.

| April 27 | Pittsburgh Penguins | 3–2 | Washington Capitals | Verizon Center | Recap |
| No scoring | | First period | No scoring |
| Sidney Crosby (3) – 00:12; Sidney Crosby (4) – 01:04 | | Second period | 18:17 – Alexander Ovechkin (4) |
| Nick Bonino (2) – 12:36 | | Third period | 08:05 – Evgeny Kuznetsov (2) |
| Marc-Andre Fleury 33 saves / 35 shots | | Goalie stats | Braden Holtby 18 saves / 21 shots |

| April 29 | Pittsburgh Penguins | 6–2 | Washington Capitals | Verizon Center | Recap |
| No scoring | | First period | No scoring |
| Matt Cullen (1) – sh – 01:15; Phil Kessel (3) – 13:04; Jake Guentzel (6) – 16:14 | | Second period | 02:09 – pp – Matt Niskanen (1) |
| Phil Kessel (4) – pp – 02:19; Evgeni Malkin (3) – 05:31; Jake Guentzel (7) – en – 19:17 | | Third period | 03:44 – Nicklas Backstrom (3) |
| Marc-Andre Fleury 34 saves / 36 shots | | Goalie stats | Braden Holtby 11 saves / 14 shots Philipp Grubauer 7 saves / 9 shots |

| May 1 | Washington Capitals | 3–2 | OT | Pittsburgh Penguins | PPG Paints Arena | Recap |
| Nicklas Backstrom (4) – pp – 13:05 | | First period | | No scoring |
| No scoring | | Second period | | No scoring |
| Evgeny Kuznetsov (3) – 09:46 | | Third period | | 18:07 – Evgeni Malkin (4); 18:55 – Justin Schultz (1) |
| Kevin Shattenkirk (1) – pp – 03:13 | | First overtime period | | No scoring |
| Braden Holtby 28 saves / 30 shots | | Goalie stats | | Marc-Andre Fleury 30 saves / 33 shots |

| May 3 | Washington Capitals | 2–3 | Pittsburgh Penguins | PPG Paints Arena | Recap |
| No scoring | | First period | 04:39 – Patric Hornqvist (3) |
| Evgeny Kuznetsov (4) – 07:21; Nate Schmidt (1) – 08:33 | | Second period | 03:51 – Jake Guentzel (8); 11:24 – pp – Justin Schultz (2) |
| No scoring | | Third period | No scoring |
| Braden Holtby 16 saves / 19 shots | | Goalie stats | Marc-Andre Fleury 36 saves / 38 shots |

| May 6 | Pittsburgh Penguins | 2–4 | Washington Capitals | Verizon Center | Recap |
| Carl Hagelin (1) – 10:24 | | First period | 19:30 – Andre Burakovsky (1) |
| Phil Kessel (5) – pp – 04:20 | | Second period | No scoring |
| No scoring | | Third period | 02:49 – Nicklas Backstrom (5); 07:20 – Evgeny Kuznetsov (5); 07:47 – Alexander Ovechkin (5) |
| Marc-Andre Fleury 28 saves / 32 shots | | Goalie stats | Braden Holtby 20 saves / 22 shots |

| May 8 | Washington Capitals | 5–2 | Pittsburgh Penguins | PPG Paints Arena | Recap |
| T. J. Oshie (4) – pp – 12:41 | | First period | No scoring |
| Andre Burakovsky (2) – 06:36 | | Second period | No scoring |
| Nicklas Backstrom (6) – 00:16; John Carlson (2) – pp – 11:17; Andre Burakovsky (3) – 12:29 | | Third period | 16:38 – Jake Guentzel (9); 17:30 – Evgeni Malkin (5) |
| Braden Holtby 16 saves / 18 shots | | Goalie stats | Marc-Andre Fleury 21 saves / 26 shots |

| May 10 | Pittsburgh Penguins | 2–0 | Washington Capitals | Verizon Center | Recap |
| No scoring | | First period | No scoring |
| Bryan Rust (5) – 08:49 | | Second period | No scoring |
| Patric Hornqvist (4) – 04:14 | | Third period | No scoring |
| Marc-Andre Fleury 29 saves / 29 shots | | Goalie stats | Braden Holtby 26 saves / 28 shots |

| Pittsburgh won series 4–3 |

=== Western Conference second round ===
==== (C3) St. Louis Blues vs. (WC2) Nashville Predators ====
This was the first playoff meeting between these teams. Nashville won three of the five games in this year's regular season series.

The Predators defeated the Blues in six games. The first game of the series had Nashville gain a 3–1 lead, St. Louis then scored twice in the third period to tie the game, but with 5:05 left in the third period, Vernon Fiddler gave the Predators 4–3 lead as well a 1–0 series lead. During the game, Kevin Fiala fractured his left leg after being checked by Robert Bortuzzo; Fiala would require a stretcher to get off the ice. In game two, Vladimir Tarasenko scored twice including the game-winner, tying the series 1–1 in a 3–2 triumph. The Predators continued their home-winning streak dating back to last year's first round winning game three, by a final score of 3–1 with Colton Sissons assisting twice, increasing the streak to seven home games. Nashville won their eighth consecutive playoff home game after game four, defeating the Blues 2–1 and Pekka Rinne making 32 saves. Jaden Schwartz broke a 1–1 tie in the third period of the fifth game and maintained the 2–1 lead to a victory. In game six, Ryan Johansen scored the series-winning goal in a 3–1 victory as the Predators moved onto the conference finals for the first time in franchise history after nineteen years in the league. This left the Columbus Blue Jackets as the only team that has never made it to the conference finals, after the Winnipeg Jets beat the Predators in the 2018 Western Conference Second Round to make it to the conference finals.

| April 26 | Nashville Predators | 4–3 | St. Louis Blues | Scottrade Center | Recap |
| Colin Wilson (1) – pp – 11:24 | | First period | No scoring |
| P. K. Subban (1) – 02:22; Filip Forsberg (3) – pp – 12:11 | | Second period | 08:04 – Colton Parayko (2) |
| Vernon Fiddler (1) – 14:55 | | Third period | 06:48 – Jaden Schwartz (3); 09:22 – Vladimir Sobotka (2) |
| Pekka Rinne 27 saves / 30 shots | | Goalie stats | Jake Allen 28 saves / 32 shots |

| April 28 | Nashville Predators | 2–3 | St. Louis Blues | Scottrade Center | Recap |
| James Neal (1) – 07:49 | | First period | 19:40 – pp – Vladimir Tarasenko (2) |
| No scoring | | Second period | No scoring |
| Ryan Ellis (2) – 03:07 | | Third period | 07:39 – Jori Lehtera (1); 16:09 – Vladimir Tarasenko (3) |
| Pekka Rinne 17 saves / 20 shots | | Goalie stats | Jake Allen 22 saves / 24 shots |

| April 30 | St. Louis Blues | 1–3 | Nashville Predators | Bridgestone Arena | Recap |
| No scoring | | First period | 10:34 – Ryan Ellis (3) |
| Alexander Steen (3) – 12:59 | | Second period | 02:29 – Cody McLeod (1) |
| No scoring | | Third period | 14:11 – Roman Josi (3) |
| Jake Allen 31 saves / 34 shots | | Goalie stats | Pekka Rinne 22 saves / 23 shots |

| May 2 | St. Louis Blues | 1–2 | Nashville Predators | Bridgestone Arena | Recap |
| No scoring | | First period | No scoring |
| No scoring | | Second period | No scoring |
| Joel Edmundson (3) – 16:11 | | Third period | 05:09 – pp – Ryan Ellis (4); 13:03 – James Neal (2) |
| Jake Allen 23 saves / 25 shots | | Goalie stats | Pekka Rinne 32 saves / 33 shots |

| May 5 | Nashville Predators | 1–2 | St. Louis Blues | Scottrade Center | Recap |
| No scoring | | First period | No scoring |
| James Neal (3) – pp – 13:50 | | Second period | 05:43 – Dmitrij Jaskin (1) |
| No scoring | | Third period | 00:25 – Jaden Schwartz (4) |
| Pekka Rinne 30 saves / 32 shots | | Goalie stats | Jake Allen 21 saves / 22 shots |

| May 7 | St. Louis Blues | 1–3 | Nashville Predators | Bridgestone Arena | Recap |
| Paul Stastny (2) – 02:04 | | First period | No scoring |
| No scoring | | Second period | 00:35 – Roman Josi (4) |
| No scoring | | Third period | 03:15 – Ryan Johansen (2); 19:00 – en – Calle Jarnkrok (1) |
| Jake Allen 15 saves / 17 shots | | Goalie stats | Pekka Rinne 23 saves / 24 shots |

| Nashville won series 4–2 |

==== (P1) Anaheim Ducks vs. (P2) Edmonton Oilers ====
This was the second playoff meeting between these teams; their only previous series was in the 2006 Western Conference final, which Edmonton won in five games. Edmonton won three of the five games in this year's regular season series.

The Ducks defeated the Oilers in seven games. In the first game, Mark Letestu scored twice and Leon Draisaitl had a goal and three assists as the Oilers, who once gained a 3–1 lead in the third period only to see the Ducks tie the game in less than three minutes, scored twice in the final five minutes to achieve a 5–3 lead and thus the victory. Goalie Cam Talbot stopped 39 shots and former-Duck Patrick Maroon scored the game-winning goal in game two for the Oilers' 2–1 victory. Anaheim took an early 3–0 lead in game three only to see the Oilers tie the game. The Ducks took the lead back in the second period with Chris Wagner's goal, then Jakob Silfverberg scored his second of the game and Ryan Kesler provided an insurance goal to close out the game 6–3. In game four, Ryan Getzlaf scored twice to take the lead for the Ducks after being down 2–0 in the game, then in 45 seconds into overtime, Silfverberg scored to give the Ducks the victory and the series tie. The Oilers gained a 3–0 lead in game five, but with 3:16 left in the game, the Ducks scored three times to tie the game becoming the first team to score three goals in that span of time left to tie the game. The comeback was complete at 6:57 of double-overtime when Corey Perry gave Ducks a 4–3 victory and a 3–2 series lead. The Oilers scored five times in the first period of game six and Draisaitl had a hat trick along with two assists to defeat the Ducks 7–1 and force a seventh game. In game seven, Nick Ritchie's third-period goal proved to be the series-winner as the Ducks were able to win a series via seventh game for the first time since 2006 and advance to the conference finals with a 2–1 victory.

| April 26 | Edmonton Oilers | 5–3 | Anaheim Ducks | Honda Center | Recap |
| No scoring | | First period | No scoring |
| Mark Letestu (2) – pp – 06:22 | | Second period | 00:37 – pp – Ryan Getzlaf (4) |
| Mark Letestu (3) – pp – 06:23; Adam Larsson (1) – 08:03; Adam Larsson (2) – 15:20; Leon Draisaitl (2) – en – 18:55 | | Third period | 09:22 – Patrick Eaves (2); 10:47 – Jakob Silfverberg (3) |
| Cam Talbot 33 saves / 36 shots | | Goalie stats | John Gibson 27 saves / 31 shots |

| April 28 | Edmonton Oilers | 2–1 | Anaheim Ducks | Honda Center | Recap |
| Andrej Sekera (1) – 01:05 | | First period | No scoring |
| Patrick Maroon (2) – pp – 06:41 | | Second period | 15:34 – pp – Jakob Silfverberg (4) |
| No scoring | | Third period | No scoring |
| Cam Talbot 39 saves / 40 shots | | Goalie stats | John Gibson 21 saves / 23 shots |

| April 30 | Anaheim Ducks | 6–3 | Edmonton Oilers | Rogers Place | Recap |
| Rickard Rakell (3) – 00:25; Jakob Silfverberg (5) – 05:33; Ryan Getzlaf (5) – 11:51 | | First period | 19:20 – Patrick Maroon (3) |
| Chris Wagner (1) – 09:28 | | Second period | 01:28 – Anton Slepyshev (2); 08:40 – Connor McDavid (3) |
| Jakob Silfverberg (6) – 04:56; Ryan Kesler (1) – 10:38 | | Third period | No scoring |
| John Gibson 24 saves / 27 shots | | Goalie stats | Cam Talbot 22 saves / 28 shots |

| May 3 | Anaheim Ducks | 4–3 | OT | Edmonton Oilers | Rogers Place | Recap |
| No scoring | | First period | | 15:38 – pp – Milan Lucic (2); 17:43 – Connor McDavid (4) |
| Ryan Getzlaf (6) – 01:37; Rickard Rakell (4) – 05:33; Ryan Getzlaf (7) – 14:25 | | Second period | | No scoring |
| No scoring | | Third period | | 18:18 – Drake Caggiula (1) |
| Jakob Silfverberg (7) – 00:45 | | First overtime period | | No scoring |
| John Gibson 29 saves / 32 shots | | Goalie stats | | Cam Talbot 35 saves / 39 shots |

| May 5 | Edmonton Oilers | 3–4 | 2OT | Anaheim Ducks | Honda Center | Recap |
| No scoring | | First period | | No scoring |
| Leon Draisaitl (3) – 00:15; Connor McDavid (5) – pp – 02:55; Drake Caggiula (2) – 12:28 | | Second period | | No scoring |
| No scoring | | Third period | | 16:44 – Ryan Getzlaf (8); 17:19 – Cam Fowler (1); 19:45 – Rickard Rakell (5) |
| No scoring | | Second overtime period | | 06:57 – Corey Perry (2) |
| Cam Talbot 60 saves / 64 shots | | Goalie stats | | John Gibson 35 saves / 38 shots |

| May 7 | Anaheim Ducks | 1–7 | Edmonton Oilers | Rogers Place | Recap |
| No scoring | | First period | 02:45 – Leon Draisaitl (4); 07:22 – Leon Draisaitl (5); 08:25 – Zack Kassian (3); 11:39 – Mark Letestu (4); 18:49 – pp – Mark Letestu (5) |
| Rickard Rakell (6) – 08:56 | | Second period | 00:45 – Anton Slepyshev (3); 15:27 – pp – Leon Draisaitl (6) |
| No scoring | | Third period | No scoring |
| John Gibson 3 saves / 6 shots Jonathan Bernier 25 saves / 29 shots | | Goalie stats | Cam Talbot 34 saves / 35 shots |

| May 10 | Edmonton Oilers | 1–2 | Anaheim Ducks | Honda Center | Recap |
| Drake Caggiula (3) – 03:31 | | First period | No scoring |
| No scoring | | Second period | 08:55 – Andrew Cogliano (1) |
| No scoring | | Third period | 03:21 – Nick Ritchie (2) |
| Cam Talbot 28 saves / 30 shots | | Goalie stats | John Gibson 23 saves / 24 shots |

| Anaheim won series 4–3 |

== Conference finals ==
=== Eastern Conference final ===
==== (M2) Pittsburgh Penguins vs. (A2) Ottawa Senators ====
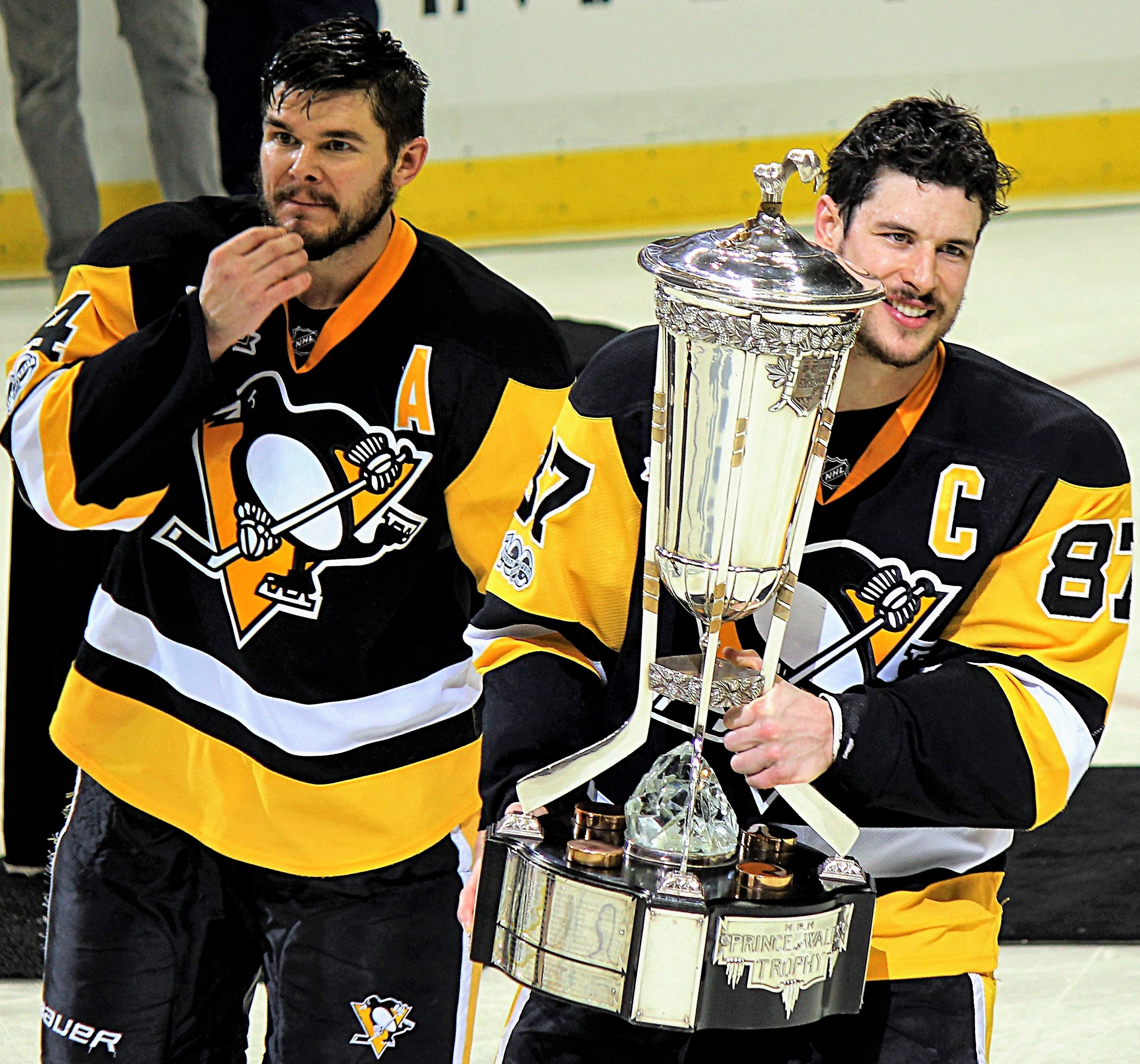
Chris Kunitz (left) and Captain Sidney Crosby (right) with the Prince of Wales Trophy after winning game seven of the Eastern Conference Final.

This was the fifth playoff meeting between these teams with Pittsburgh winning three of the four previous series. They last met in the 2013 Eastern Conference semifinals, which Pittsburgh won in five games. This was the second consecutive conference finals appearance for Pittsburgh who defeated the Tampa Bay Lightning the previous year in seven games. Ottawa last went to the conference finals in 2007; they defeated the Buffalo Sabres in five games. Ottawa won two of the three games in this year's regular season series.

The Penguins defeated the Senators in seven games. In game one, the Senators held onto a one-goal lead until Evgeni Malkin tied the game in the third period, but in overtime, Bobby Ryan scored to give Ottawa a 2–1 victory. The second game remained scoreless until Phil Kessel scored with 6:55 left in the game to give the Penguins a 1–0 lead and the victory; Marc-Andre Fleury made 23 saves in the process. In the first period of game three, the Senators scored four times including three goals in a span of 2:18, prompting Pittsburgh to replace goaltender Fleury with Matt Murray, who had not played since his injury before the first game of the playoffs. Ottawa went on to win 5–1 to take the series lead. Making his first start of the playoffs in game four, Murray made 24 saves and held off an Ottawa comeback attempt as Pittsburgh won 3–2 to even the series. Murray stopped all 26 shots and the Penguins routed the Senators 7–0 in game five to take a 3–2 series lead. Craig Anderson made 45 saves in game six, forcing a seventh game in a 2–1 victory. In game seven, Chris Kunitz of the Penguins and Mark Stone of the Senators started the scoring 20 seconds apart in the second period. After both Justin Schultz and Ryan Dzingel scored in the third period to make the game 2–2, the match headed into overtime. In double-overtime, Kunitz scored his second of the game, set up by Sidney Crosby, to send the Pittsburgh Penguins to the Finals for the second consecutive year.

| May 13 | Ottawa Senators | 2–1 | OT | Pittsburgh Penguins | PPG Paints Arena | Recap |
| Jean-Gabriel Pageau (8) – 14:32 | | First period | | No scoring |
| No scoring | | Second period | | No scoring |
| No scoring | | Third period | | 14:25 – Evgeni Malkin (6) |
| Bobby Ryan (5) – 04:59 | | First overtime period | | No scoring |
| Craig Anderson 27 saves / 28 shots | | Goalie stats | | Marc-Andre Fleury 33 saves / 35 shots |

| May 15 | Ottawa Senators | 0–1 | Pittsburgh Penguins | PPG Paints Arena | Recap |
| No scoring | | First period | No scoring |
| No scoring | | Second period | No scoring |
| No scoring | | Third period | 13:05 – Phil Kessel (6) |
| Craig Anderson 28 saves / 29 shots | | Goalie stats | Marc-Andre Fleury 23 saves / 23 shots |

| May 17 | Pittsburgh Penguins | 1–5 | Ottawa Senators | Canadian Tire Centre | Recap |
| No scoring | | First period | 00:48 – Mike Hoffman (5); 10:34 – Marc Methot (2); 12:28 – Derick Brassard (4); 12:52 – Zack Smith (1) |
| No scoring | | Second period | 18:18 – Kyle Turris (4) |
| Sidney Crosby (5) – pp – 06:07 | | Third period | No scoring |
| Marc-Andre Fleury 5 saves / 9 shots Matt Murray 19 saves / 20 shots | | Goalie stats | Craig Anderson 25 saves / 26 shots |

| May 19 | Pittsburgh Penguins | 3–2 | Ottawa Senators | Canadian Tire Centre | Recap |
| Olli Maatta (1) – 19:14 | | First period | No scoring |
| Sidney Crosby (6) – pp – 07:41; Brian Dumoulin (1) – 11:30 | | Second period | 18:22 – Clarke MacArthur (3) |
| No scoring | | Third period | 14:59 – Tom Pyatt (2) |
| Matt Murray 24 saves / 26 shots | | Goalie stats | Craig Anderson 32 saves / 35 shots |

| May 21 | Ottawa Senators | 0–7 | Pittsburgh Penguins | PPG Paints Arena | Recap |
| No scoring | | First period | 08:14 – Olli Maatta (2); 12:03 – pp – Sidney Crosby (7); 16:04 – Bryan Rust (6); 18:17 – Scott Wilson (2) |
| No scoring | | Second period | 01:54 – Matt Cullen (2) |
| No scoring | | Third period | 00:50 – pp – Phil Kessel (7); 08:49 – pp – Trevor Daley (1) |
| Craig Anderson 10 saves / 14 shots Mike Condon 19 saves / 22 shots | | Goalie stats | Matt Murray 25 saves / 25 shots |

| May 23 | Pittsburgh Penguins | 1–2 | Ottawa Senators | Canadian Tire Centre | Recap |
| No scoring | | First period | No scoring |
| Evgeni Malkin (7) – 04:51 | | Second period | 13:15 – pp – Bobby Ryan (6) |
| No scoring | | Third period | 01:34 – Mike Hoffman (6) |
| Matt Murray 28 saves / 30 shots | | Goalie stats | Craig Anderson 45 saves / 46 shots |

| May 25 | Ottawa Senators | 2–3 | 2OT | Pittsburgh Penguins | PPG Paints Arena | Recap |
| No scoring | | First period | | No scoring |
| Mark Stone (5) – 10:15 | | Second period | | 09:55 – Chris Kunitz (1) |
| Ryan Dzingel (2) – 14:41 | | Third period | | 11:44 – pp – Justin Schultz (3) |
| No scoring | | Second overtime period | | 05:09 – Chris Kunitz (2) |
| Craig Anderson 39 saves / 42 shots | | Goalie stats | | Matt Murray 27 saves / 29 shots |

| Pittsburgh won series 4–3 |

=== Western Conference final ===
==== (P1) Anaheim Ducks vs. (WC2) Nashville Predators ====
This was the second consecutive playoff meeting and the third overall between these teams with Nashville winning both previous series, including a seven-game win in the previous year's first round. This was Anaheim's fifth conference finals appearance. They last made the conference finals in 2015 where they were defeated in seven games by the Chicago Blackhawks. This was Nashville's first conference finals appearance in their 19-year history. Anaheim won two of the three games in this year's regular season series.

The Predators defeated the Ducks in six games. The first game of the series went into overtime, and at 9:24 James Neal put the puck past the Ducks goaltender to take game one, 3–2. In game two, the Ducks rallied from an early-two-goal deficit to defeat the Predators 5–3 and Ryan Getzlaf assisted thrice in the victory. Nashville kept their home playoff win streak alive in game three, winning 2–1; after a pair of goals were disallowed due to goaltender interference, Roman Josi scored for the Predators with 2:43 left in the game. Although Nashville tied the game after being down by two goals in game four, Anaheim won the game on Corey Perry's goal 10:25 into overtime, tying the series 2–2 in a 3–2 victory. Pekka Rinne made 32 saves in game five for the Predators as Nashville took a 3–2 series lead in a 3–1 victory. In game six, Colton Sissons' hat trick goal was the series-winning goal in a 6–3 victory, putting the Nashville Predators in the Finals for the first time in their 19-year history. The Predators became the third eighth seeded team to reach the Stanley Cup Finals, joining the 2006 Edmonton Oilers and the 2012 Los Angeles Kings.

| May 12 | Nashville Predators | 3–2 | OT | Anaheim Ducks | Honda Center | Recap |
| Filip Forsberg (4) – 12:34 | | First period | | 05:15 – Jakob Silfverberg (8) |
| Austin Watson (1) – 02:42 | | Second period | | No scoring |
| No scoring | | Third period | | 07:21 – Hampus Lindholm (1) |
| James Neal (4) – 09:24 | | First overtime period | | No scoring |
| Pekka Rinne 27 saves / 29 shots | | Goalie stats | | John Gibson 43 saves / 46 shots |

| May 14 | Nashville Predators | 3–5 | Anaheim Ducks | Honda Center | Recap |
| Ryan Johansen (3) – 04:18; James Neal (5) – pp – 08:32 | | First period | 19:00 – pp – Sami Vatanen (1) |
| Filip Forsberg (5) – 07:59 | | Second period | 00:39 – Jakob Silfverberg (9); 10:41 – Ondrej Kase (1); 17:07 – Nick Ritchie (3) |
| No scoring | | Third period | 19:16 – en – Antoine Vermette (1) |
| Pekka Rinne 22 saves / 26 shots | | Goalie stats | John Gibson 30 saves / 33 shots |

| May 16 | Anaheim Ducks | 1–2 | Nashville Predators | Bridgestone Arena | Recap |
| No scoring | | First period | No scoring |
| Corey Perry (3) – pp – 15:35 | | Second period | No scoring |
| No scoring | | Third period | 03:54 – Filip Forsberg (6); 17:17 – pp – Roman Josi (5) |
| John Gibson 38 saves / 40 shots | | Goalie stats | Pekka Rinne 19 saves / 20 shots |

| May 18 | Anaheim Ducks | 3–2 | OT | Nashville Predators | Bridgestone Arena | Recap |
| Rickard Rakell (7) – 11:30 | | First period | | No scoring |
| Nick Ritchie (4) – 10:22 | | Second period | | No scoring |
| No scoring | | Third period | | 13:33 – P. K. Subban (2); 19:24 – Filip Forsberg (7) |
| Corey Perry (4) – 10:25 | | First overtime period | | No scoring |
| John Gibson 32 saves / 34 shots | | Goalie stats | | Pekka Rinne 33 saves / 36 shots |

| May 20 | Nashville Predators | 3–1 | Anaheim Ducks | Honda Center | Recap |
| No scoring | | First period | No scoring |
| Colin Wilson (2) – pp – 19:19 | | Second period | 12:46 – Chris Wagner (2) |
| Pontus Aberg (1) – 11:01; Austin Watson (2) – en – 19:12 | | Third period | No scoring |
| Pekka Rinne 32 saves / 33 shots | | Goalie stats | John Gibson 10 saves / 10 shots Jonathan Bernier 16 saves / 18 shots |

| May 22 | Anaheim Ducks | 3–6 | Nashville Predators | Bridgestone Arena | Recap |
| No scoring | | First period | 01:21 – Austin Watson (3); 08:47 – Colton Sissons (3) |
| Ondrej Kase (2) – 04:45 | | Second period | No scoring |
| Chris Wagner (3) – 05:00; Cam Fowler (2) – 08:52 | | Third period | 03:00 – Colton Sissons (4); 14:00 – Colton Sissons (5); 17:38 – en – Filip Forsberg (8); 18:26 – en – Austin Watson (4) |
| Jonathan Bernier 12 saves / 16 shots | | Goalie stats | Pekka Rinne 38 saves / 41 shots |

| Nashville won series 4–2 |

== Stanley Cup Finals ==
This was the first playoff meeting between these two teams. Pittsburgh made their second consecutive Stanley Cup Finals appearance and their sixth overall; they won in the previous year defeating the San Jose Sharks in six games. Nashville made their first Finals appearance in their franchise's history. These teams split their two-game regular season series.

| May 29 | Nashville Predators | 3–5 | Pittsburgh Penguins | PPG Paints Arena | Recap |
| No scoring | | First period | 15:38 – pp – Evgeni Malkin (8); 16:37 – Conor Sheary (1); 19:43 – Nick Bonino (3) |
| Ryan Ellis (5) – pp – 08:21 | | Second period | No scoring |
| Colton Sissons (6) – pp – 10:06; Frederick Gaudreau (1) – 13:29 | | Third period | 16:43 – Jake Guentzel (10); 18:58 – en – Nick Bonino (4) |
| Pekka Rinne 7 saves / 11 shots | | Goalie stats | Matt Murray 23 saves / 26 shots |

| May 31 | Nashville Predators | 1–4 | Pittsburgh Penguins | PPG Paints Arena | Recap |
| Pontus Aberg (2) – 12:57 | | First period | 16:36 – Jake Guentzel (11) |
| No scoring | | Second period | No scoring |
| No scoring | | Third period | 00:10 – Jake Guentzel (12); 03:13 – Scott Wilson (3); 03:28 – Evgeni Malkin (9) |
| Pekka Rinne 21 saves / 25 shots Juuse Saros 2 saves / 2 shots | | Goalie stats | Matt Murray 37 saves / 38 shots |

| June 3 | Pittsburgh Penguins | 1–5 | Nashville Predators | Bridgestone Arena | Recap |
| Jake Guentzel (13) – 02:46 | | First period | No scoring |
| No scoring | | Second period | 05:51 – pp – Roman Josi (6); 06:33 – Frederick Gaudreau (2); 19:37 – James Neal (6) |
| No scoring | | Third period | 04:54 – Craig Smith (1); 13:10 – pp – Mattias Ekholm (1) |
| Matt Murray 28 saves / 33 shots | | Goalie stats | Pekka Rinne 27 saves / 28 shots |

| June 5 | Pittsburgh Penguins | 1–4 | Nashville Predators | Bridgestone Arena | Recap |
| Sidney Crosby (8) – 15:57 | | First period | 14:51 – Calle Jarnkrok (2) |
| No scoring | | Second period | 03:45 – Frederick Gaudreau (3); 13:08 – Viktor Arvidsson (3) |
| No scoring | | Third period | 16:37 – en – Filip Forsberg (9) |
| Matt Murray 22 saves / 25 shots | | Goalie stats | Pekka Rinne 23 saves / 24 shots |

| June 8 | Nashville Predators | 0–6 | Pittsburgh Penguins | PPG Paints Arena | Recap |
| No scoring | | First period | 01:31 – pp – Justin Schultz (4); 06:43 – Bryan Rust (7); 19:49 – Evgeni Malkin (10) |
| No scoring | | Second period | 01:19 – Conor Sheary (2); 08:02 – Phil Kessel (8); 16:40 – Ron Hainsey (2) |
| No scoring | | Third period | No scoring |
| Pekka Rinne 6 saves / 9 shots Juuse Saros 12 saves / 15 shots | | Goalie stats | Matt Murray 24 saves / 24 shots |

| June 11 | Pittsburgh Penguins | 2–0 | Nashville Predators | Bridgestone Arena | Recap |
| No scoring | | First period | No scoring |
| No scoring | | Second period | No scoring |
| Patric Hornqvist (5) – 18:25; Carl Hagelin (2) – en – 19:46 | | Third period | No scoring |
| Matt Murray 27 saves / 27 shots | | Goalie stats | Pekka Rinne 27 saves / 28 shots |

| Pittsburgh won series 4–2 |

== Player statistics ==
=== Skaters ===
These are the top ten skaters based on points.

| Player | Team | GP | G | A | Pts | +/– | PIM |
|---|---|---|---|---|---|---|---|
| Evgeni Malkin | Pittsburgh Penguins | 25 | 10 | 18 | 28 | +9 | 53 |
| Sidney Crosby | Pittsburgh Penguins | 24 | 8 | 19 | 27 | +4 | 10 |
| Phil Kessel | Pittsburgh Penguins | 25 | 8 | 15 | 23 | +12 | 2 |
| Jake Guentzel | Pittsburgh Penguins | 25 | 13 | 8 | 21 | +1 | 10 |
| Ryan Getzlaf | Anaheim Ducks | 17 | 8 | 11 | 19 | +7 | 8 |
| Erik Karlsson | Ottawa Senators | 19 | 2 | 16 | 18 | +13 | 10 |
| Filip Forsberg | Nashville Predators | 22 | 9 | 7 | 16 | +14 | 14 |
| Leon Draisaitl | Edmonton Oilers | 13 | 6 | 10 | 16 | +8 | 19 |
| Bobby Ryan | Ottawa Senators | 19 | 6 | 9 | 15 | +1 | 14 |
| Jakob Silfverberg | Anaheim Ducks | 17 | 9 | 5 | 14 | –4 | 6 |
| Roman Josi | Nashville Predators | 22 | 6 | 8 | 14 | +2 | 12 |

=== Goaltenders ===
This is a combined table of the top five goaltenders based on goals against average and the top five goaltenders based on save percentage, with at least 420 minutes played. The table is sorted by GAA, and the criteria for inclusion are bolded.

| Player | Team | GP | W | L | SA | GA | GAA | SV% | SO | TOI |
|---|---|---|---|---|---|---|---|---|---|---|
| Matt Murray | Pittsburgh Penguins | 11 | 7 | 3 | 303 | 19 | **1.70** | **.937** | 3 | 668:55 |
| Jake Allen | St. Louis Blues | 11 | 6 | 5 | 336 | 22 | **1.96** | **.935** | 0 | 674:56 |
| Pekka Rinne | Nashville Predators | 22 | 14 | 8 | 599 | 42 | **1.96** | **.930** | 2 | 1288:44 |
| Henrik Lundqvist | New York Rangers | 12 | 6 | 6 | 395 | 29 | **2.25** | **.927** | 1 | 774:34 |
| Craig Anderson | Ottawa Senators | 19 | 11 | 8 | 590 | 46 | **2.34** | .922 | 1 | 1178:08 |
| Cam Talbot | Edmonton Oilers | 13 | 7 | 6 | 437 | 33 | 2.48 | **.924** | 2 | 799:23 |
| Marc-Andre Fleury | Pittsburgh Penguins | 15 | 9 | 6 | 490 | 37 | 2.56 | **.924** | 2 | 866:31 |

== Television ==
This marked the sixth postseason under NBC Sports' current 10-year contract for American television rights to the NHL. All national coverage of games aired on either NBCSN, the NBC broadcast network, NHL Network, USA Network, or CNBC. During the first round, excluding games exclusively broadcast on NBC, the regional rightsholders of each participating U.S. team produced local telecasts of their respective games; NBCUniversal held exclusive rights to all games from the second round onward. Unlike past seasons, the national broadcasts were no longer blacked out on television in the markets of participating teams, and they could co-exist with the local broadcasts (however, NBC-provided streaming was still restricted in Boston and Pittsburgh).

For first-round games involving Chicago, San Jose and Washington—teams whose regional rights are held by the co-owned NBC Sports Regional Networks—the national broadcasts shared the same video as the local broadcasts but overdubbed with national commentators. This was done so NBC would not have to bring additional equipment to these games to produce an entirely separate telecast for the national audience.

In Canada, this marked the third postseason under Rogers Media's 12-year contract. Games aired across Sportsnet, SN1, SN360, FX, and CBC under the Hockey Night in Canada brand. Games were also streamed on Sportsnet Now, CBCSports.ca (for games televised by CBC), or the subscription service Rogers NHL GameCentre Live. French-language coverage was on TVA Sports. Rogers agreed not to schedule games on CBC for the first four Sunday nights of the playoffs, so that the network could broadcast Canada: The Story of Us, a documentary series it had commissioned as part of programming commemorating the 150th anniversary of Canadian confederation.

| Preceded by 2016 Stanley Cup playoffs | Stanley Cup playoffs 2017 | Succeeded by 2018 Stanley Cup playoffs |
