= Jean-Gabriel Pageau =

Canadian ice hockey player (born 1992)

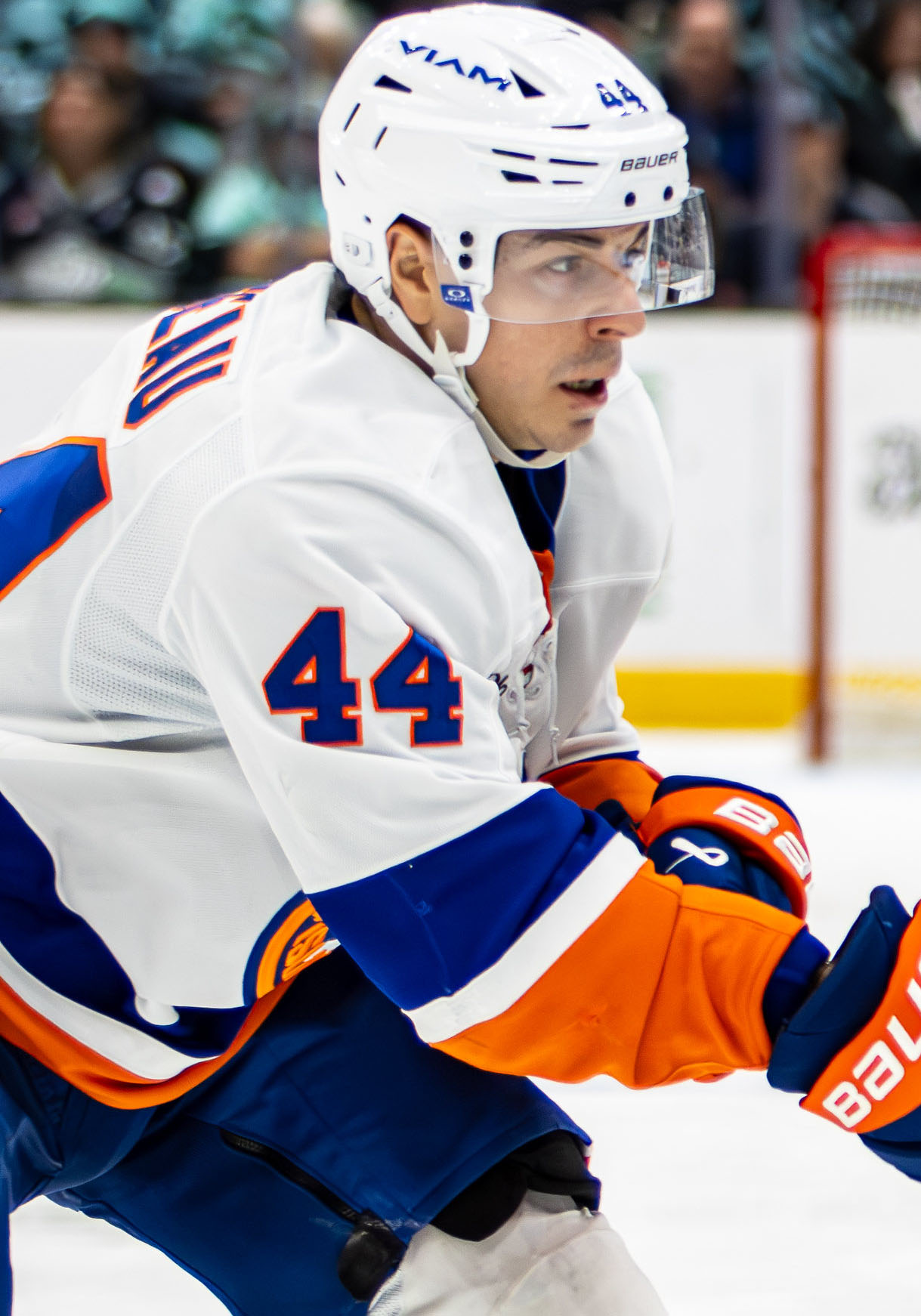
- Pageau with the New York Islanders in 2024
- Born: November 11, 1992 (age 33) Ottawa, Ontario, Canada
- Height: 5 ft 9 in (175 cm)
- Weight: 172 lb (78 kg; 12 st 4 lb)
- Position: Centre
- Shoots: Right
- NHL team Former teams: New York Islanders; Ottawa Senators
- National team: Canada
- NHL draft: 96th overall, 2011; Ottawa Senators
- Playing career: 2012–present

Jean-Gabriel Pageau (/pæˈʒoʊ/; born November 11, 1992) is a Canadian professional ice hockey player who is a centre for the New York Islanders of the National Hockey League (NHL). He was selected by the Ottawa Senators in the fourth round, 96th overall, of the 2011 NHL entry draft with whom he spent the first part of his NHL career prior to his trade to the Islanders in 2020.

== Playing career ==
=== Junior ===
Pageau was born in Ottawa and raised in neighbouring Hull, Quebec. As a youth, he played in the 2005 Quebec International Pee-Wee Hockey Tournament with a minor ice hockey team from Gatineau. He later played with the Gatineau Olympiques and Chicoutimi Saguenéens of the Quebec Major Junior Hockey League (QMJHL).

=== Ottawa Senators ===
Selected by his hometown Ottawa Senators in the 2011 NHL entry draft, Pageau began his professional career in 2012–13 with Ottawa's American Hockey League (AHL) affiliate, the Binghamton Senators, registering seven goals and 29 points in 69 games before being called-up to Ottawa on April 10, 2013. Pageau stayed in Ottawa for the remainder of the season, registering two goals and four points in nine regular season games. On May 5, he scored a hat-trick in game 3 of the conference final series as the Senators defeated the Montreal Canadiens 6–1, and he became just the second Senators player to score a hat-trick in the Stanley Cup playoffs after Daniel Alfredsson.

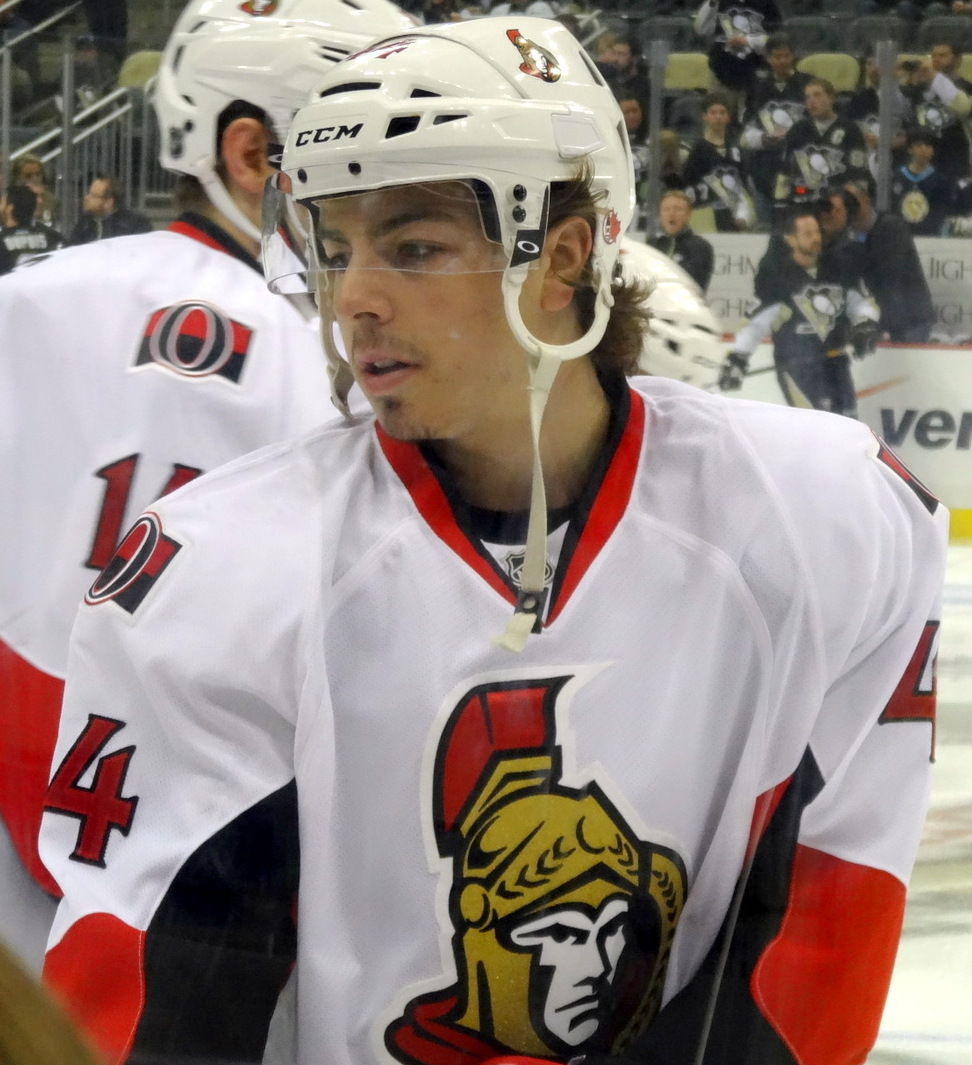
Pageau with the Senators during a game in the 2013 Stanley Cup playoffs

Following the season, Pageau was honoured by his hometown; on June 18, 2013, he signed the official guestbook at the start of the Gatineau City Council meeting and received a plaque. Mayor of Gatineau Marc Bureau called him "a true ambassador for the city".

Pageau would only appear in parts of the 2013–14 and 2014–15 seasons under head coach Paul MacLean. Upon MacLean being fired, new head coach Dave Cameron would allow Pageau to play more games during the 2014–15 season, including all six of the Senators' 2015 playoff games. In June 2015, it was announced Pageau signed a two-year, one-way contract with the Senators worth an annual average of $900,000. Pageau would play in all 82 games during the 2015–16 season and achieve career highs in goals (19), assists (24) and points (43), and led the NHL in short-handed goals with seven. During the 2017 playoffs, Pageau scored four goals in game 2 of the second round series against the New York Rangers, including the game-winner in double overtime.

On July 17, 2017, Pageau signed a new three-year, $9.3 million contract worth $3.1 million annually, avoiding arbitration.

In the final year of his contract with the Senators in the 2019–20 season, Pageau emerged as the club's top line centre, scoring at a career-high pace with 24 goals and 40 points in 60 games.

=== New York Islanders ===
With the Senators out of playoff contention and as a potential free agent, Pageau ended his eight-year tenure with Ottawa when he was traded to the New York Islanders at the NHL trade deadline on February 24, 2020, in exchange for a conditional first-round pick and a second-round pick in 2020 and a conditional third-round selection in 2021. He was immediately signed to a six-year, $30 million contract extension to remain with the Islanders through 2026. In his debut with the Islanders on February 25, he received a 10-minute game misconduct, scored his NHL career-high 25th goal of the season, and skated 12:07 on the third line with Josh Bailey and Michael Dal Colle. Prior to the NHL's pause in play due to the ongoing COVID-19 pandemic, the Islanders had failed to qualify for the 2020 Stanley Cup playoffs as they lost seven straight games leading up to March 12. However, they were made eligible for the newly-created Stanley Cup qualifiers when the NHL resumed play. Over the lengthy pause, Pageau returned to Ottawa to spend quarantine until the NHL resumed play.

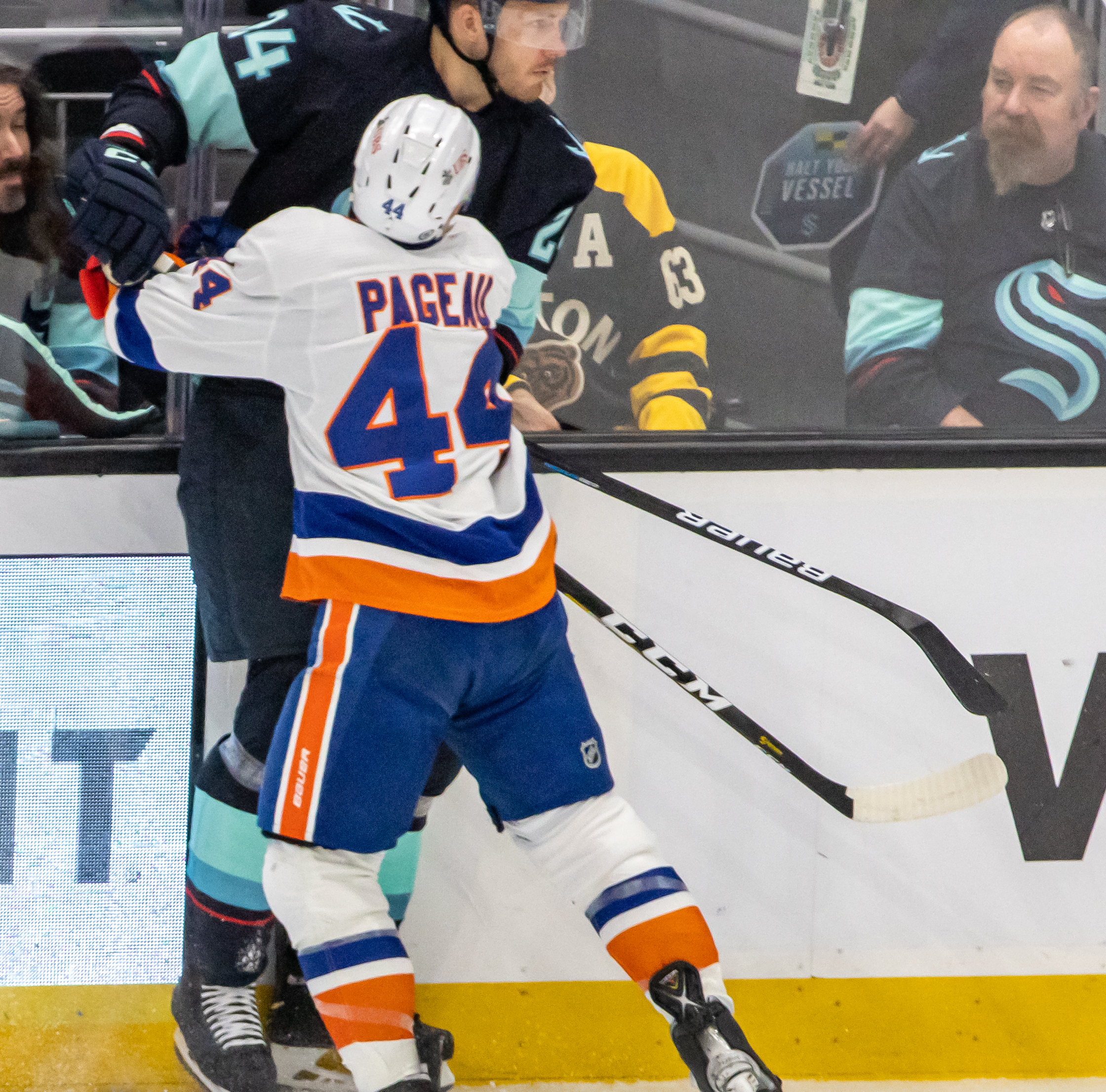
Pageau checking Seattle Kraken player Jamie Oleksiak in 2023.

Pageau and the Islanders met with the Florida Panthers in the qualifying round. He played an important role for the Islanders during their series against the Panthers. He scored the first goal of game 1 against the Panthers and won 80 percent of his faceoffs while skating in all situations including the power play and penalty kill. Throughout the first three games against the Panthers, Pageau played on a line with Tom Kühnhackl and Derick Brassard before Kühnhackl was replaced by Leo Komarov. As the Islanders eliminated the Panthers, Pageau ended the series tied for the team lead in goals with Anthony Beauvillier. He also finished the series logging the most shorthanded time of ice among Islanders forwards with a total of 8:19 and played 7:38 on the power play. Following their series win, the Islanders faced off against the Washington Capitals in the first round. As Pageau remained on a line with Brassard and Komarov through the Capitals series, they helped push the Capitals to the brink of elimination by winning the first three games of the series. Despite an attempted comeback, the Islanders eliminated the Capitals in five games to advance to the second round. The Islanders then faced the Philadelphia Flyers whom they eliminated in seven games to advance to the conference finals for the first time since 1993. During their conference finals series against the Tampa Bay Lightning, Pageau was moved onto a line with Matt Martin and Cal Clutterbuck in games 3 and 4 after Komarov and Casey Cizikas were injured.

On March 25, 2021, Pageau recorded his 100th career goal in a 4–3 win over the Boston Bruins. On August 7, Pageau was voted the winner of the Bob Nystrom Award for the 2020–21 season.

On March 6, 2026, Pageau was re-signed to a three-year, $14.55 million contract.

== International play ==
On April 12, 2018, Pageau was one of the 18 players to be named to the 2018 World Championship to represent Canada, where he scored one goal and tallied three assists.

== Career statistics ==
=== Regular season and playoffs ===
			Regular season					Playoffs
Season	Team	League	GP	G	A	Pts	PIM	GP	G	A	Pts	PIM
2009–10	Gatineau Olympiques	QMJHL	62	16	15	31	20	4	1	0	1	0
2010–11	Gatineau Olympiques	QMJHL	67	32	47	79	22	24	13	16	29	20
2011–12	Gatineau Olympiques	QMJHL	23	23	16	39	12	—	—	—	—	—
2011–12	Chicoutimi Saguenéens	QMJHL	23	9	17	26	13	16	4	10	14	6
2012–13	Binghamton Senators	AHL	69	7	22	29	33	—	—	—	—	—
2012–13	Ottawa Senators	NHL	9	2	2	4	0	10	4	2	6	8
2013–14	Binghamton Senators	AHL	46	20	24	44	23	4	1	0	1	2
2013–14	Ottawa Senators	NHL	28	2	0	2	12	—	—	—	—	—
2014–15	Binghamton Senators	AHL	27	11	10	21	27	—	—	—	—	—
2014–15	Ottawa Senators	NHL	50	10	9	19	9	6	0	0	0	0
2015–16	Ottawa Senators	NHL	82	19	24	43	26	—	—	—	—	—
2016–17	Ottawa Senators	NHL	82	12	21	33	24	19	8	2	10	16
2017–18	Ottawa Senators	NHL	78	14	15	29	34	—	—	—	—	—
2018–19	Ottawa Senators	NHL	39	4	8	12	14	—	—	—	—	—
2019–20	Ottawa Senators	NHL	60	24	16	40	32	—	—	—	—	—
2019–20	New York Islanders	NHL	7	2	0	2	17	21	8	3	11	21
2020–21	New York Islanders	NHL	54	14	14	28	10	19	3	10	13	6
2021–22	New York Islanders	NHL	77	18	21	39	30	—	—	—	—	—
2022–23	New York Islanders	NHL	70	13	27	40	14	6	0	1	1	0
2023–24	New York Islanders	NHL	82	11	22	33	13	4	1	1	2	0
2024–25	New York Islanders	NHL	79	14	28	42	23	—	—	—	—	—
2025–26	New York Islanders	NHL	74	17	18	35	4	—	—	—	—	—
NHL totals			871	176	225	401	264	86	24	19	43	51

=== International ===
Year	Team	Event	Result	GP	G	A	Pts	PIM
2018	Canada	WC	4th	10	1	4	5	12
Senior totals				10	1	4	5	12
