= Bobby Ryan =

American ice hockey player (born 1987)

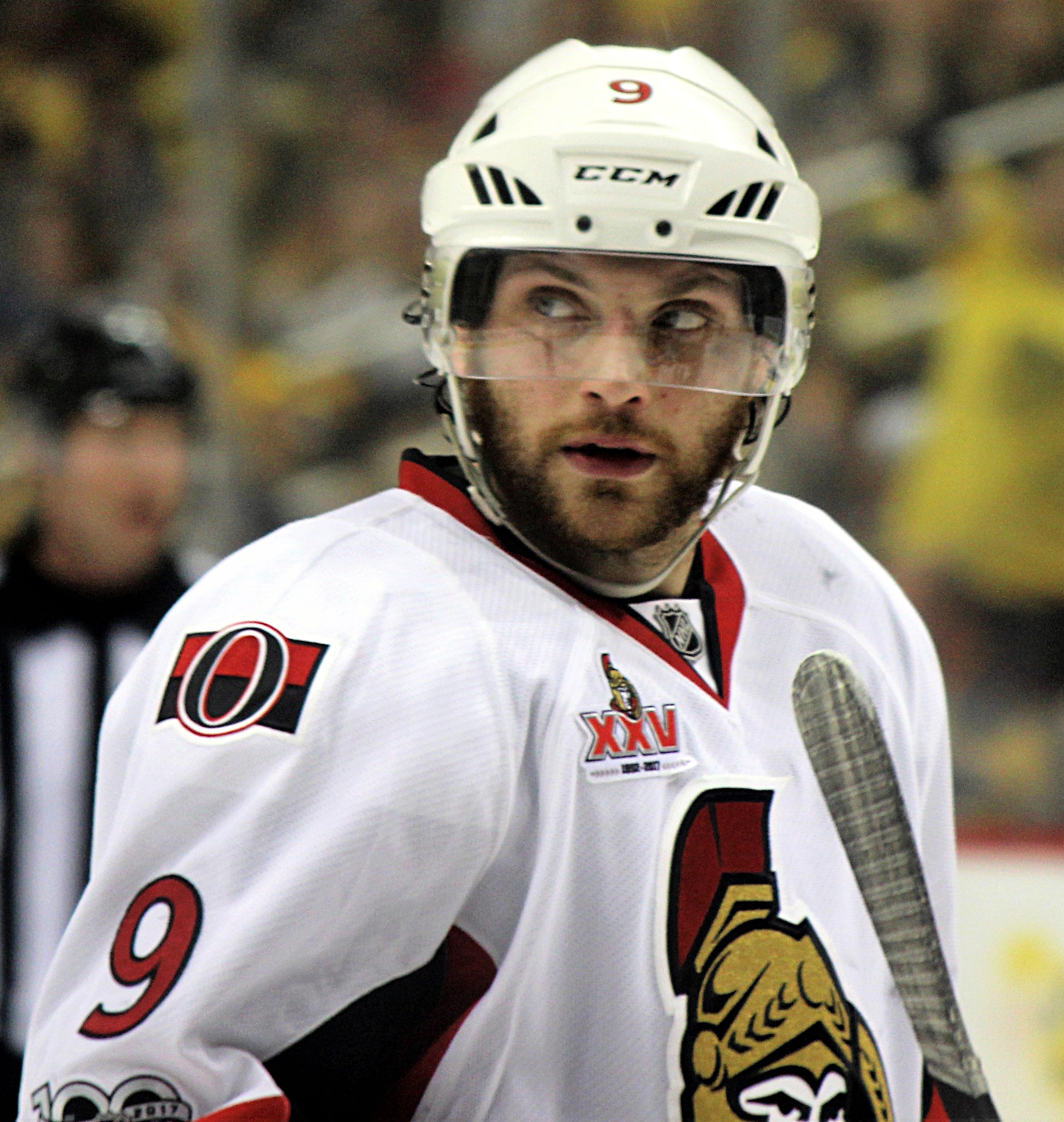
- Ryan with the Ottawa Senators in 2017
- Born: March 17, 1987 (age 39) Cherry Hill, New Jersey, U.S.
- Height: 6 ft 2 in (188 cm)
- Weight: 207 lb (94 kg; 14 st 11 lb)
- Position: Right wing
- Shot: Right
- Played for: Anaheim Ducks; Ottawa Senators; Detroit Red Wings
- National team: United States
- NHL draft: 2nd overall, 2005; Mighty Ducks of Anaheim
- Playing career: 2007–2021
Medal record
Ice hockey
Representing United States
Olympic Games
Silver medal – second place	2010 Vancouver

Robert Shane Ryan (né Stevenson; March 17, 1987) is an American former professional ice hockey winger. He played for the Anaheim Ducks, Ottawa Senators and Detroit Red Wings in the National Hockey League (NHL). He was drafted second overall by the Mighty Ducks of Anaheim in the 2005 NHL entry draft.

He played six seasons with the Ducks before being traded to the Senators in 2013, and one season with Detroit in 2020–21. He has also represented the United States in international and Olympic hockey.

== Playing career ==
=== Junior ===
After winning national championships with his minor hockey team, the Los Angeles Junior Kings, Ryan initially committed to playing for the USA Hockey's National Team Development Program at the under-18 level. Despite telling Ontario Hockey League (OHL) teams he would not play major junior, Ryan was selected by the Owen Sound Attack seventh overall in the 2003 OHL Selection Draft. He was ultimately persuaded to play for the team and immediately began his major junior career with a 39-point rookie campaign in 2003–04. After improving to 89 points the following season, Ryan was drafted second overall by the Mighty Ducks of Anaheim in the 2005 NHL entry draft.

=== Professional ===
==== Anaheim Ducks ====
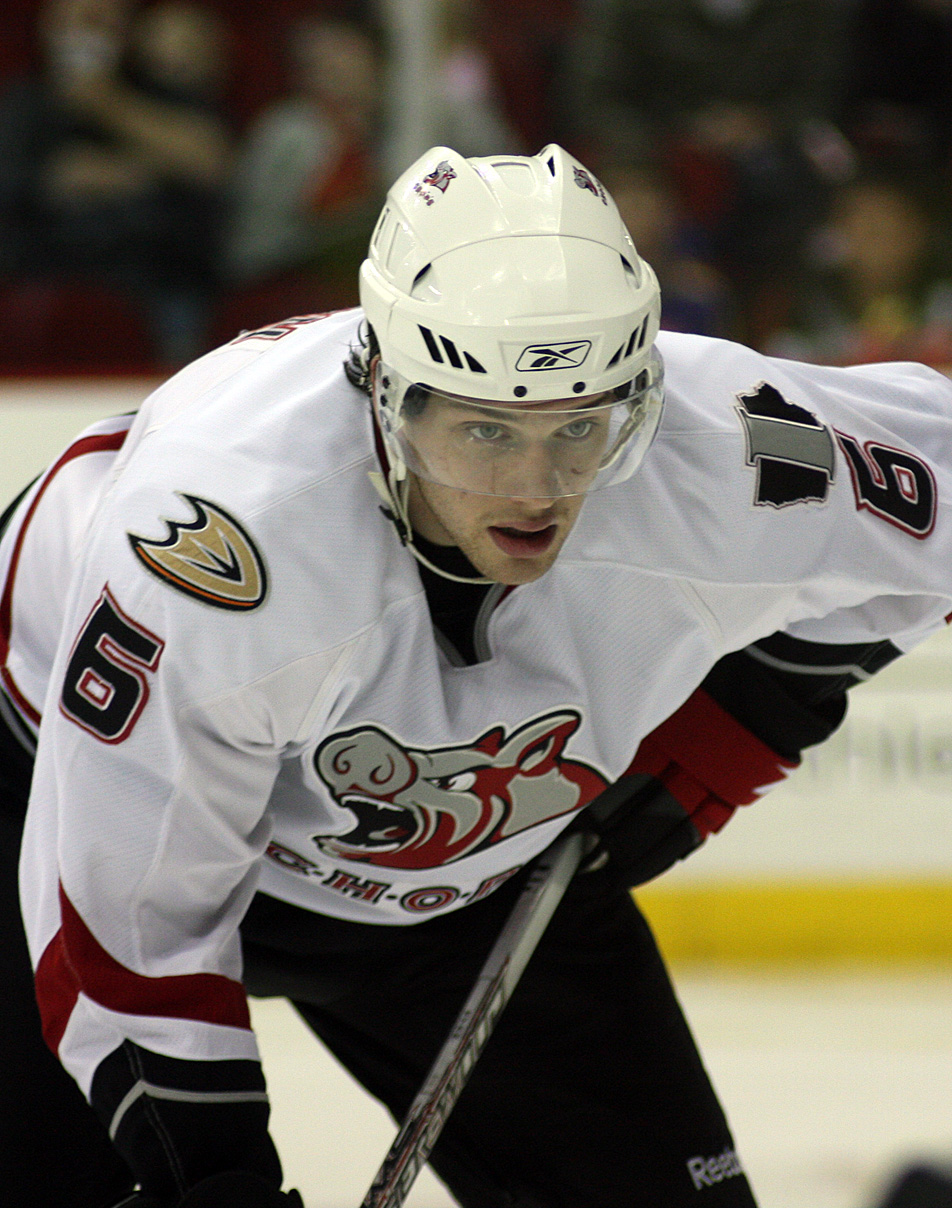
Ryan with the Iowa Chops in November 2008

Ryan closed out his OHL career after the 2006–07 season. Upon elimination in the playoffs, he was assigned by the Ducks to the Portland Pirates of the American Hockey League (AHL) for the final eight games of the 2006–07 AHL season. He then started the 2007–08 season with the Ducks, scoring his first career NHL goal in his debut against the Los Angeles Kings at The O2 arena in London, England. Ryan was, however, sent back to Portland after four games. He was recalled on March 7, 2008, when Corey Perry's leg injury sidelined him for the remainder of the regular season.

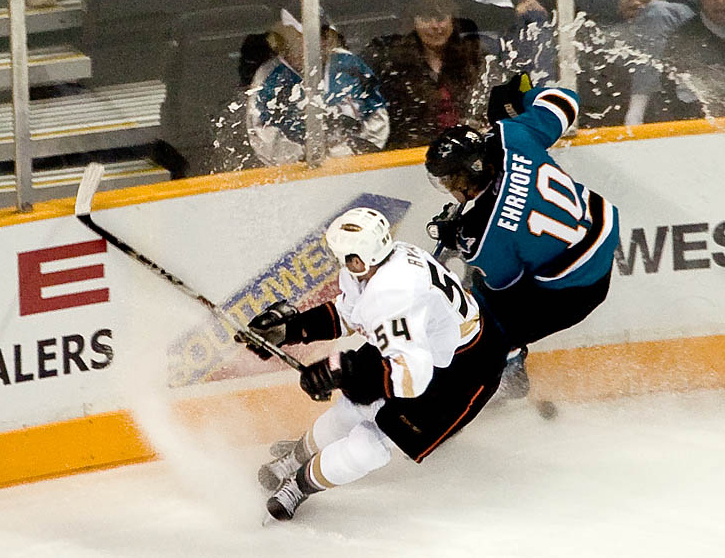
Ryan battling for the puck with Christian Ehrhoff during 2007 pre-season play

In the following 2008–09 season, Ryan once again made the opening roster, but was to be sent down to the Ducks' new AHL affiliate, the Iowa Chops, due to salary cap issues. He was recalled during the season and recorded a natural hat trick, the first hat trick of his NHL career, on January 8, 2009, against Los Angeles at the Staples Center in a 4–3 loss. In doing so, he became the first rookie in Ducks history to record a hat trick, it being the fastest of any player in the 15-year history of the franchise. On March 22, 2009, Ryan broke the franchise rookie point record set by Dustin Penner after tallying two assists for his 46th point in an Anaheim win over the Phoenix Coyotes.

On April 22, 2009, Ryan was named a finalist for the Calder Memorial Trophy, along with Steve Mason of the Columbus Blue Jackets and Kris Versteeg of the Chicago Blackhawks—Mason ultimately won the award.

On September 14, 2010, just prior to the 2010–11 season, the Ducks signed Ryan to a five-year, $25.5 million contract extension. On December 12, during a game against the Minnesota Wild, left-handed captain Mikko Koivu stole Ryan's stick while in the Ducks' offensive zone, whereupon the right-handed Ryan picked up Koivu's stick and scored a goal with it. The play was later named number one on TSN's SportsCentre's "Top 10 NHL Oddities" list.

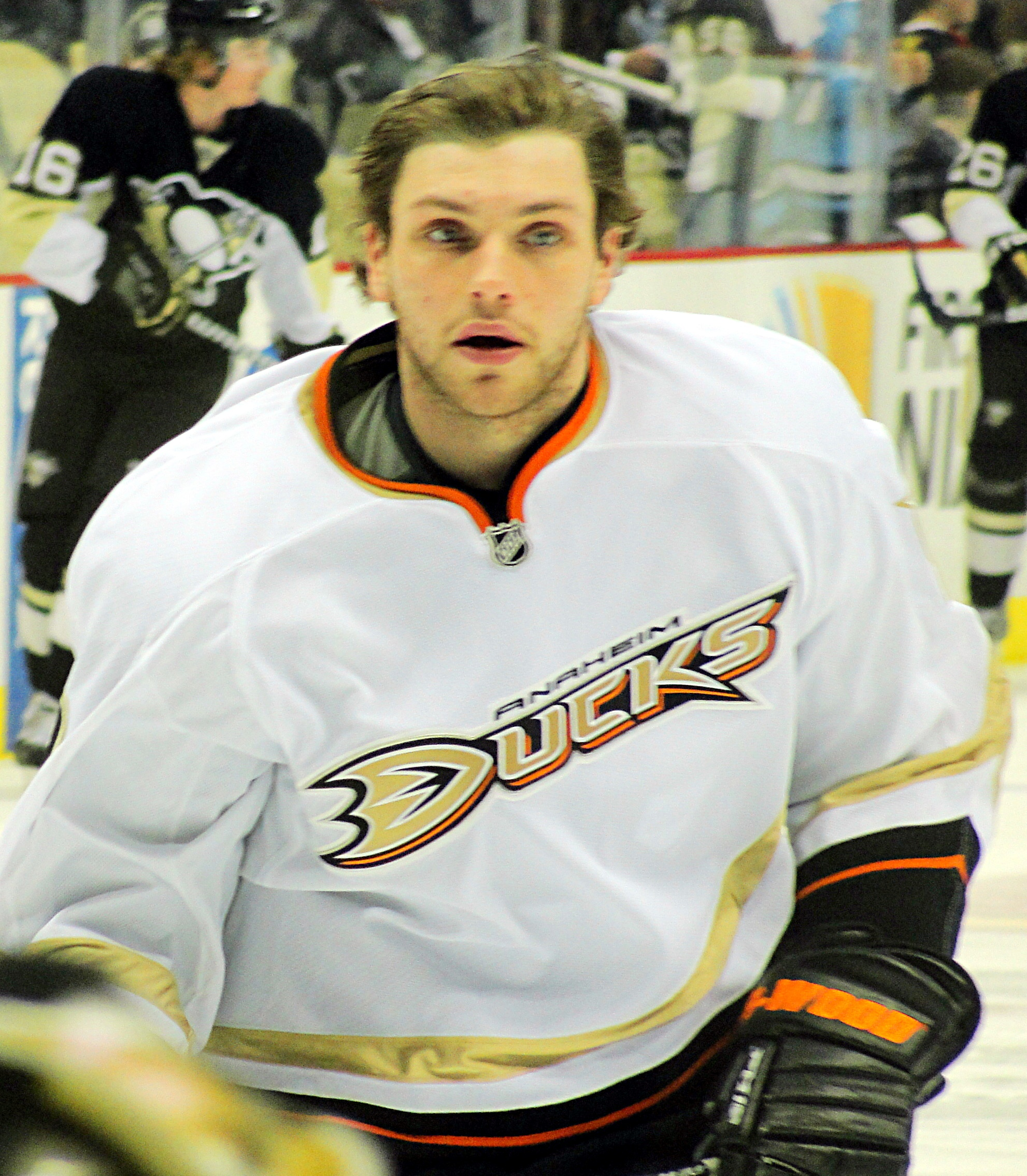
Ryan with the Ducks in 2012

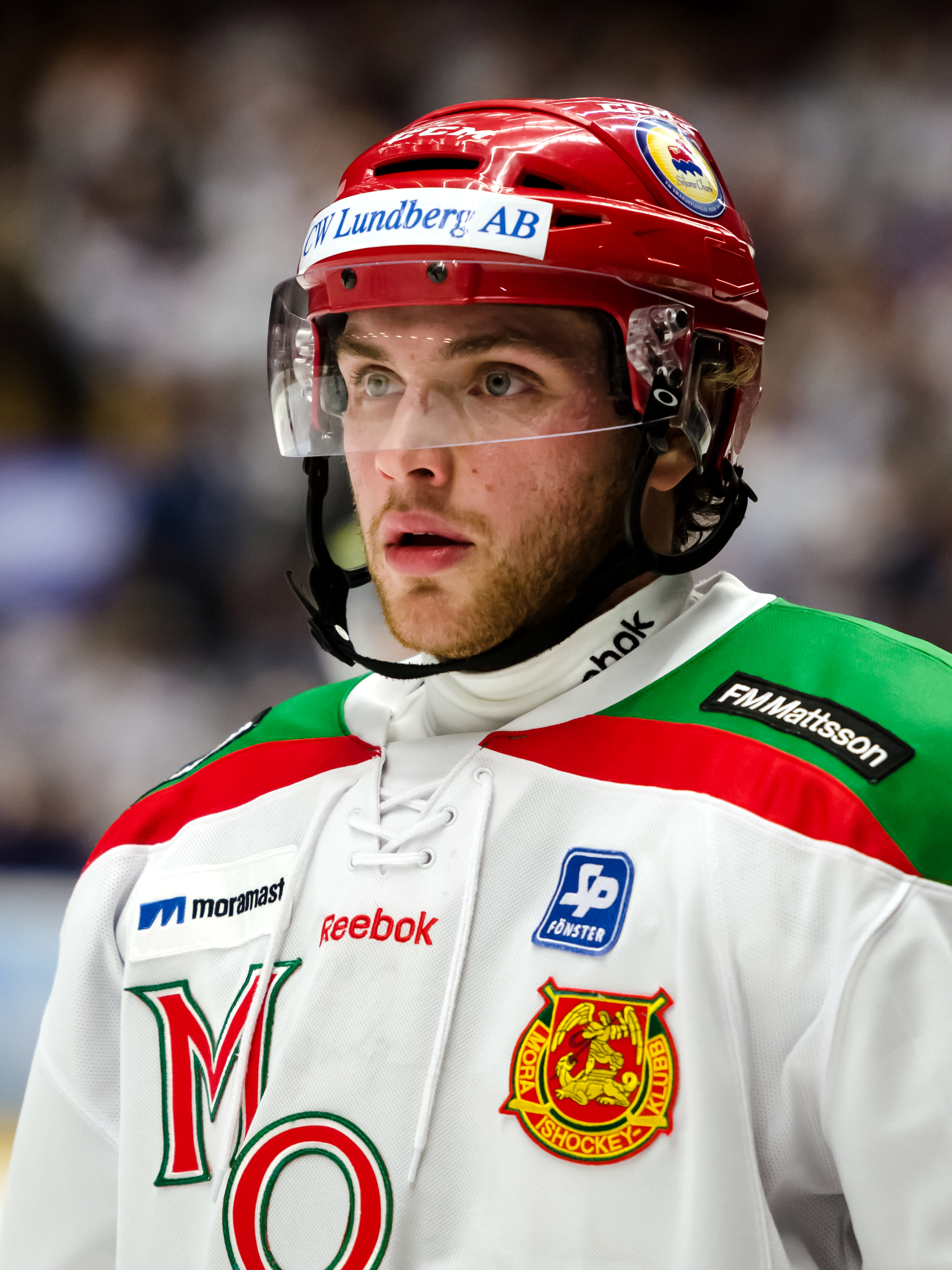
Ryan with Mora IK in 2012

During the 2012–13 NHL lockout, Ryan, being locked out of the 2012–13 NHL season, signed with Mora IK of the Swedish HockeyAllsvenskan alongside fellow NHL player Anze Kopitar. He played 11 games for Mora before returning to the Ducks for training camp after an agreement to end the lockout was reached.

On November 24, 2012, Ryan participated in Operation Hat Trick, a charity hockey game at Boardwalk Hall in Atlantic City to raise money for Hurricane Sandy victims.

==== Ottawa Senators ====
On July 5, 2013, Ryan was acquired by the Ottawa Senators in exchange for forwards Jakob Silfverberg, Stefan Noesen and a first-round draft pick in 2014 (used to select Nick Ritchie). Ryan registered 23 goals in his first season with the Senators, a season cut short by injury—on March 27, 2014, it was announced via Twitter that he would undergo season-ending sports hernia surgery to repair an injury he had been dealing with since November 2013.

On October 2, 2014, the Senators announced they had signed Ryan to a seven-year, $50.75 million contract extension, a deal that would keep him with the team through the 2021–22 season. Ryan responded with his first All-Star Game appearance after being selected to represent Team Foligno at the 2015 NHL All-Star Game in Columbus, Ohio, on January 25, 2015.

Ryan struggled during the 2016–17 regular season earning only 25 points in 62 games while also coping with injuries. However, he proved to be an asset to the team in the 2017 Stanley Cup playoffs, scoring four goals in six games during the first round of the playoffs against the Boston Bruins, helping the Senators to move onto the second round against the New York Rangers. He finished the playoffs with six goals and nine assists as the Senators were eliminated in double overtime in game seven of the Eastern Conference Finals against the Pittsburgh Penguins.

In the 2019–20 season, Ryan missed approximately three months while attending an NHL player assistance program. It was later revealed by Ryan that he had entered the program due to ongoing struggles with alcohol abuse. He returned to NHL action on February 25, 2020, in an away game versus the Nashville Predators. In his first post-rehab home game two days later, Ryan made headlines by scoring his fifth career hat trick. On September 7, Ryan was awarded the Bill Masterton Memorial Trophy by the NHL for perseverance and dedication to hockey.

On September 25, 2020, Ryan was placed on unconditional waivers for the purpose of buying out the final two years remaining on his contract with the Senators. The following day, Ryan cleared waivers and became a free agent for the first time in his career.

==== Detroit Red Wings ====
On October 9, 2020, the first day of free agency, Ryan signed a one-year, $1 million contract with the Detroit Red Wings.

Ryan scored his first goal for the Detroit Red Wings in a 4-2 win against the Carolina Hurricanes on January 16, 2021.

Ryan was offered a professional try-out in the Red Wings' 2021 training camp, but he was released at the end of camp. Ryan did not officially retire from pro hockey at that point, although he joked about being retired in a tweet. He was still receiving his buyout money from the Senators and if he officially retired, he would have forfeited that money. Ryan's buyout money ended in 2024.

== International play ==
Ryan played for the United States at the 2006 World Junior Championships, where the team lost to Finland in the bronze medal game, earning them a fourth-place finish.

Four years later, Ryan was selected to Team USA for the 2010 Winter Olympics in Vancouver on January 1, 2010. He scored the U.S.' first goal of the tournament at 18:59 of the first period in their opening match against then-Ducks teammate Jonas Hiller of Switzerland. Team USA eventually lost to Canada in the gold medal game, earning Ryan and the Americans a silver medal. He scored one goal and one assist in the tournament.

In 2014, Ryan was passed over by the U.S. Olympic Hockey Team despite his strong play during the first half of the 2013–14 season. This snub created somewhat of a controversy surrounding Ryan's play and the U.S. Olympic Team.

== Personal life ==
Ryan was born Robert Shane Stevenson, Jr. in Cherry Hill, New Jersey, and grew up in Collingswood, attending Queen of Heaven for grade school.

On October 29, 1997, Ryan's father, Bob Stevenson, badly beat Ryan's mother, Melody, in a drunken rage, leaving her hospitalized with four broken ribs, a skull fracture and a punctured lung. Ryan's father was charged with attempted murder and jumped bail, fleeing to Canada. His wife later forgave him and she and Bobby joined him in Canada, living under assumed names. Stevenson had picked the surname Ryan after watching Saving Private Ryan, and his son followed it. The family eventually relocated to El Segundo, California so that Ryan could play in an elite youth hockey feeder system. In February 2000, Ryan's father, who had been supporting the family as a professional gambler, was arrested at home by the United States Marshals Service; he was sentenced to five years in a Camden prison.

Ryan played in the 2001 Quebec International Pee-Wee Hockey Tournament with the Los Angeles Junior Kings minor ice hockey team.

He married Danielle Rhodes in 2015, and had two children with her.

In December 2022, Ryan joined as co-host of a Senators-based podcast called 'Coming in Hot' with Brent Wallace and Jason York. In April 2024, following Ryan going on an online diatribe dismissing women's sports, Ryan and the Coming in Hot podcast parted ways.

== Career statistics ==
=== Regular season and playoffs ===
			Regular season					Playoffs
Season	Team	League	GP	G	A	Pts	PIM	GP	G	A	Pts	PIM
2003–04	Owen Sound Attack	OHL	65	22	17	39	52	7	1	2	3	2
2004–05	Owen Sound Attack	OHL	62	37	52	89	51	8	2	7	9	8
2005–06	Owen Sound Attack	OHL	59	31	64	95	44	11	5	7	12	14
2006–07	Owen Sound Attack	OHL	63	43	59	102	66	4	1	1	2	2
2006–07	Portland Pirates	AHL	8	3	6	9	6	—	—	—	—	—
2007–08	Anaheim Ducks	NHL	23	5	5	10	6	2	0	0	0	2
2007–08	Portland Pirates	AHL	48	21	28	49	38	16	8	12	20	18
2008–09	Iowa Chops	AHL	14	9	10	19	19	—	—	—	—	—
2008–09	Anaheim Ducks	NHL	64	31	26	57	33	13	5	2	7	0
2009–10	Anaheim Ducks	NHL	81	35	29	64	81	—	—	—	—	—
2010–11	Anaheim Ducks	NHL	82	34	37	71	61	4	3	1	4	2
2011–12	Anaheim Ducks	NHL	82	31	26	57	53	—	—	—	—	—
2012–13	Mora IK	Allsv	11	10	3	13	8	—	—	—	—	—
2012–13	Anaheim Ducks	NHL	46	11	19	30	17	7	2	2	4	0
2013–14	Ottawa Senators	NHL	70	23	25	48	45	—	—	—	—	—
2014–15	Ottawa Senators	NHL	78	18	36	54	24	6	2	0	2	0
2015–16	Ottawa Senators	NHL	81	22	34	56	28	—	—	—	—	—
2016–17	Ottawa Senators	NHL	62	13	12	25	24	19	6	9	15	14
2017–18	Ottawa Senators	NHL	62	11	22	33	14	—	—	—	—	—
2018–19	Ottawa Senators	NHL	78	15	27	42	33	—	—	—	—	—
2019–20	Ottawa Senators	NHL	24	5	3	8	22	—	—	—	—	—
2020–21	Detroit Red Wings	NHL	33	7	7	14	27	—	—	—	—	—
NHL totals			866	261	308	569	470	51	18	14	32	18

=== International ===
Year	Team	Event	Result	GP	G	A	Pts	PIM
2006	United States	WJC	4th	7	3	4	7	0
2010	United States	OG	2nd place, silver medalist(s)	6	1	1	2	2
2012	United States	WC	7th	8	5	2	7	0
Junior totals				7	3	4	7	0
Senior totals				14	6	3	9	2

== Awards and honors ==
Award	Year
OHL
Second All-Rookie Team	2004
First All-Star Team	2005
CHL Top Prospects Game	2005
AHL
All-Star Game	2008
All-Rookie Team	2008
NHL
Rookie of the Month (January)	2009
All-Rookie Team	2009
All-Star Game	2015
Bill Masterton Memorial Trophy	2020

Awards and achievements
Preceded by Ladislav Šmíd	Mighty Ducks of Anaheim first-round draft pick 2005	Succeeded by Mark Mitera
Preceded by Robin Lehner	Winner of the Bill Masterton Memorial Trophy; 2020	Succeeded by Oskar Lindblom
