= 2016 Stanley Cup Final =

2016 ice hockey championship series

	1	2	3	4	5	6	Total
San Jose Sharks	2	1*	3*	1	4	1	2
Pittsburgh Penguins	3	2*	2*	3	2	3	4
- * – Denotes overtime period(s)
- Location(s): San Jose: SAP Center (3, 4, 6); Pittsburgh: Consol Energy Center (1, 2, 5)
- Coaches: San Jose: Peter DeBoer; Pittsburgh: Mike Sullivan
- Captains: San Jose: Joe Pavelski; Pittsburgh: Sidney Crosby
- National anthems: San Jose: Annemarie Martin (3), Metallica (4), Pat Monahan (6); Pittsburgh: Jeff Jimerson
- Referees: Wes McCauley (2, 4, 6); Dan O'Halloran (1, 3, 5); Dan O'Rourke (1, 3, 5); Kelly Sutherland (2, 4, 6)
- Dates: May 30 – June 12, 2016
- MVP: Sidney Crosby (Penguins)
- Series-winning goal: Kris Letang (7:46, second)
- Hall of Famers: Sharks: Joe Thornton (2025)
- Networks: Canada: (English): CBC (French): TVA Sports; United States: (English): NBC (1, 4–6), NBCSN (2–3)
- Announcers: (CBC) Jim Hughson, Craig Simpson, and Glenn Healy (TVA) Felix Seguin and Patrick Lalime (NBC/NBCSN) Mike Emrick, Eddie Olczyk, and Pierre McGuire (NHL International) Steve Mears and Kevin Weekes (NBC Sports Radio) Kenny Albert, Joe Micheletti, and Darren Eliot

The 2016 Stanley Cup Final was the championship series of the National Hockey League's (NHL) 2015–16 season, and the culmination of the 2016 Stanley Cup playoffs. The Eastern Conference champion Pittsburgh Penguins defeated the Western Conference champion San Jose Sharks four games to two to win their fourth championship in franchise history. Penguins captain Sidney Crosby was awarded the Conn Smythe Trophy as the most valuable player of the playoffs.

The Penguins finished with more points than the Sharks during the regular season, giving them home ice advantage in the series. The series began on May 30 and concluded on June 12. This was the first Finals since 2007 to feature a team making their Finals debut. This was the first playoff meeting between teams from Pittsburgh and the Bay Area since the Penguins swept the Oakland Seals in the 1970 Stanley Cup Quarterfinals.

The Eastern Conference had home-ice advantage in consecutive seasons for the first time since the 2004 and 2006 Finals (the 2004–05 season, and consequently the 2005 Final, were not played due to a lockout).

For the first time since 2006, a new scheduling format was instituted for the Finals. In previous years, the Finals were played on a Monday–Wednesday–Saturday scheme (with a few games being played on Friday). However, the league changed its scheduling to ensure an extra day off for both teams. The extra off day, along with the designated travel day, took place after games 2, 4, 5, and 6 in subsequent finals. This scheduling change was necessary as a result of the National Basketball Association (NBA) instituting a new scheduling format for its championship series that went into effect beginning in 2016.

== Paths to the Finals ==
=== Pittsburgh Penguins ===
This was Pittsburgh's fifth Finals appearance, and first since winning the Cup in 2009. The Penguins had made the playoffs every year since their win in 2009, but hadn't won a single game in the conference finals in that span.

After losing to the Rangers in the playoffs for the second consecutive year, the Penguins made waves during the 2015 offseason, trading for forwards Phil Kessel and Nick Bonino, re-signing defenceman Olli Maatta and forward Bryan Rust, and signing centres Matt Cullen and Eric Fehr in free agency. General manager Jim Rutherford fired head coach Mike Johnston on December 12, 2015, after the team limped to a 15–10–3 start. Johnston was replaced with Wilkes-Barre/Scranton Penguins coach Mike Sullivan, who went 33–16–5 over the remainder of the season. The Penguins made three major trades before the trade deadline, acquiring defencemen Trevor Daley and Justin Schultz and forward Carl Hagelin. After goalie Marc-Andre Fleury suffered a concussion on April 2, the team turned to rookie Matt Murray for the final week of the regular season and the majority of the playoffs.

Pittsburgh finished with 104 points (48–26–8) in the regular season to finish second in the Metropolitan Division. Centre and team captain Sidney Crosby led the club in scoring during the regular season and finished third in the league with 85 points.

In the playoffs, the Penguins eliminated the New York Rangers in five games after losing to them in 2014 and 2015, the Presidents' Trophy-winning Washington Capitals in six games, and the defending conference champion Tampa Bay Lightning in seven games.

=== San Jose Sharks ===
This was San Jose's first Finals appearance in their 25-year history, becoming the first team to make their Finals debut since the 2006–07 Ottawa Senators.

During the offseason the Sharks hired former New Jersey Devils head coach Peter DeBoer to replace Todd McLellan and traded for former Kings backup goalie Martin Jones. San Jose also picked up defenceman Paul Martin and right wingers Joel Ward and Dainius Zubrus via free agency. Before the trade deadline, the Sharks acquired forward Nick Spaling, defenceman Roman Polak, and goalie James Reimer.

San Jose earned 98 points (46–30–6) to finish third in the Pacific Division. Centre Joe Thornton led the club in scoring with 82 points, and finished tied for fourth in the league, followed closely by centre and team captain Joe Pavelski with 78 points and defenceman Brent Burns with 75 points.

In the playoffs, San Jose avenged their 2014 loss to the Kings, a series in which they blew a 3–0 series lead, by defeating Los Angeles in five games. San Jose also eliminated the Nashville Predators in seven games, winning every home game in the series, and the St. Louis Blues in the Conference Final in six games.

== Game summaries ==
Number in parentheses represents the player's total goals or assists to that point of the entire four rounds of the playoffs

=== Game one ===
May 30	San Jose Sharks	2–3	Pittsburgh Penguins	Consol Energy Center	Recap

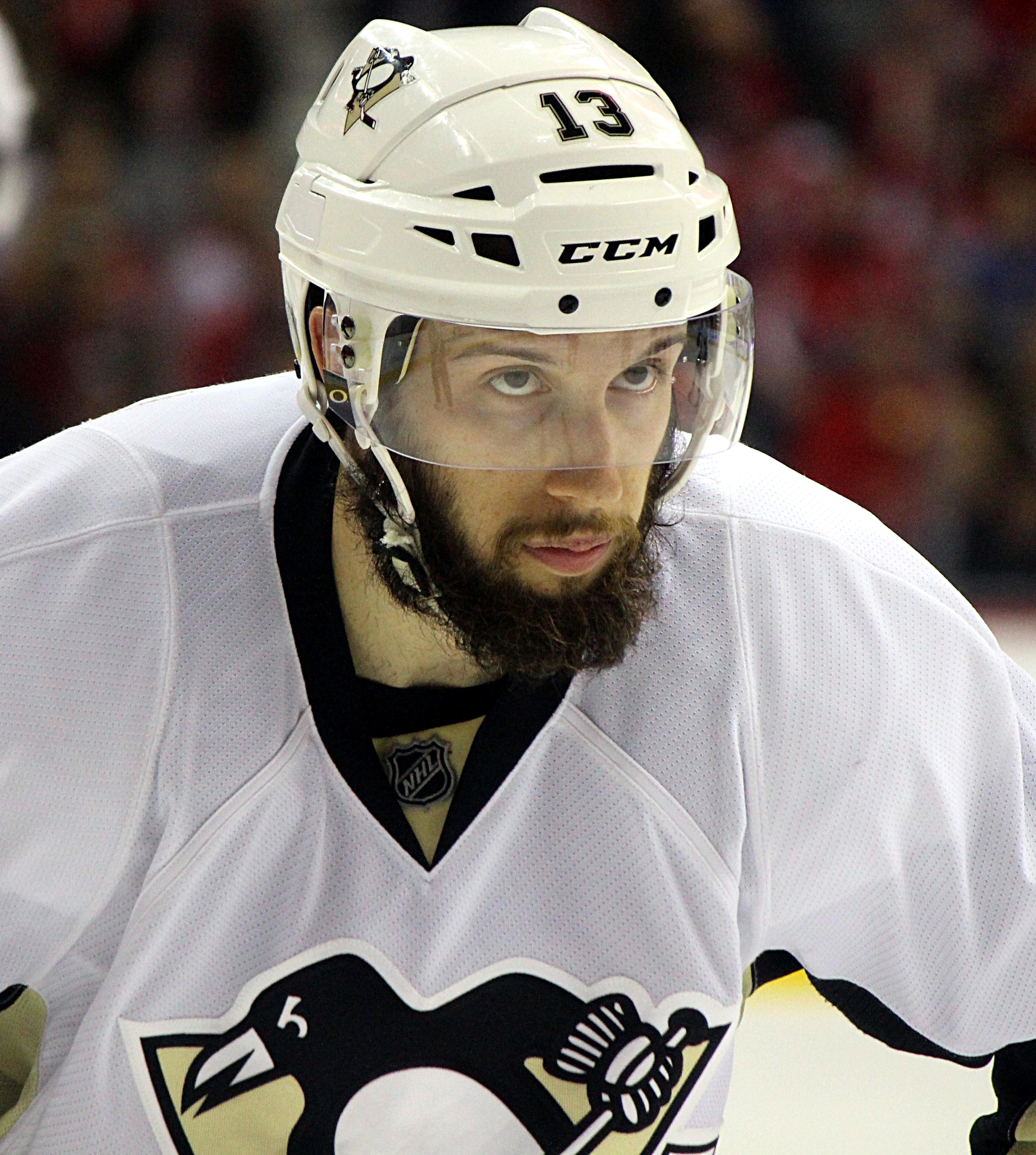
Nick Bonino scored the game-winning goal in game one.

Game one remained scoreless until Bryan Rust and Conor Sheary scored a minute apart for the Penguins midway through the first period. San Jose came back in the second period with a power play goal by Tomas Hertl at 3:02 and the tying goal by Patrick Marleau at 18:12. Despite 18 third-period Pittsburgh shots directed towards Martin Jones, the score remained tied at two until very late in the game, when Kris Letang found Nick Bonino wide open in front of the net to give the Penguins the lead. The Penguins held off the Sharks in the final minutes to win 3–2.

Scoring summary
Period	Team	Goal	Assist(s)	Time	Score
1st	PIT	Bryan Rust (6)	Justin Schultz (3) and Chris Kunitz (7)	12:46	1–0 PIT
1st	PIT	Conor Sheary (3)	Sidney Crosby (10) and Olli Maatta (5)	13:48	2–0 PIT
2nd	SJ	Tomas Hertl (6) – pp	Joonas Donskoi (5) and Brent Burns (15)	03:02	2–1 PIT
2nd	SJ	Patrick Marleau (5)	Brent Burns (16) and Logan Couture (17)	18:12	2–2
3rd	PIT	Nick Bonino (4)	Kris Letang (9) and Carl Hagelin (8)	17:27	3–2 PIT
Penalty summary
Period	Team	Player	Penalty	Time	PIM
1st	SJ	Dainius Zubrus	High-sticking	08:54	2:00
2nd	PIT	Ian Cole	Hooking	01:14	2:00
2nd	SJ	Joe Pavelski	Tripping	18:52	2:00
2nd	SJ	Joe Thornton	Roughing	18:52	2:00
2nd	PIT	Evgeni Malkin	Slashing	18:52	2:00
3rd	SJ	Patrick Marleau	Illegal check to head	04:47	2:00
3rd	PIT	Ben Lovejoy	Hooking	17:51	2:00

Shots by period
Team	1	2	3	Total
San Jose	4	13	9	26
Pittsburgh	15	8	18	41

=== Game two ===
June 1	San Jose Sharks	1–2	OT	Pittsburgh Penguins	Consol Energy Center	Recap

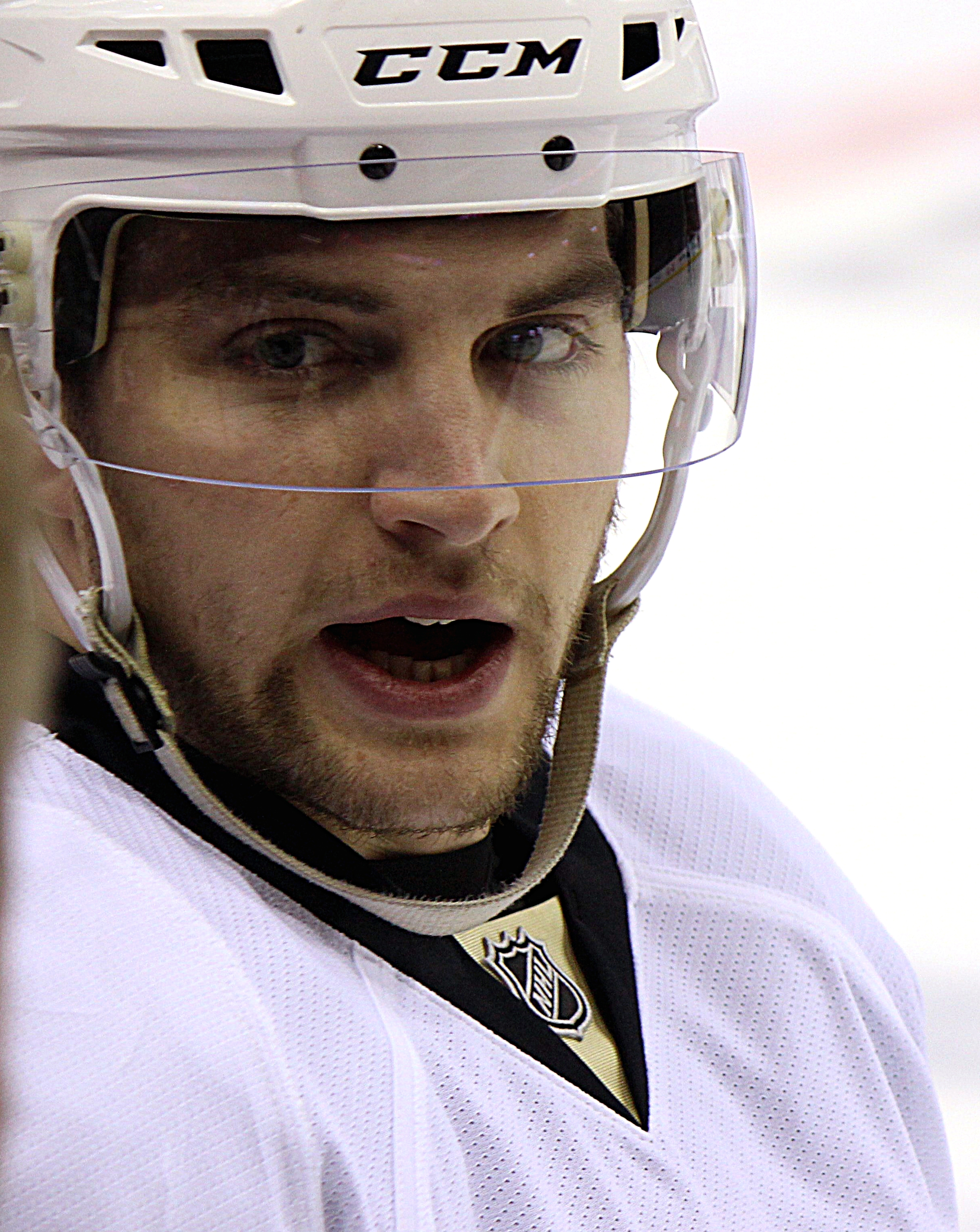
Conor Sheary scored the game-winning goal in overtime of game two.

Game two began with a scoreless first period which featured 11 Penguins shots and only six from the Sharks. Midway through the second period, a series of San Jose miscues led to a Pittsburgh goal. After Roman Polak nearly gave the puck away to Phil Kessel, Brenden Dillon was stripped by Carl Hagelin, who gave it to Nick Bonino for a tip-in by Kessel. The Sharks tied the game late in the third on a goal by Justin Braun, which sent the game into overtime. Early in overtime, a quick shot by Conor Sheary beat Martin Jones to give the Penguins a 2–1 win and 2–0 series lead.

Scoring summary
Period	Team	Goal	Assist(s)	Time	Score
1st	None				
2nd	PIT	Phil Kessel (10)	Nick Bonino (13) and Carl Hagelin (9)	08:20	1–0 PIT
3rd	SJ	Justin Braun (1)	Logan Couture (18) and Joel Ward (6)	15:55	1–1
OT	PIT	Conor Sheary (4)	Kris Letang (10) and Sidney Crosby (11)	02:35	2–1 PIT
Penalty summary
Period	Team	Player	Penalty	Time	PIM
1st	SJ	Paul Martin	Delay of game (puck over glass)	12:09	2:00
2nd	SJ	Paul Martin	High-sticking	08:50	2:00
2nd	PIT	Ian Cole	Interference	18:49	2:00
3rd	None				
OT	None				

Shots by period
Team	1	2	3	OT	Total
San Jose	6	5	9	2	22
Pittsburgh	11	12	6	1	30

=== Game three ===
June 4	Pittsburgh Penguins	2–3	OT	San Jose Sharks	SAP Center	Recap

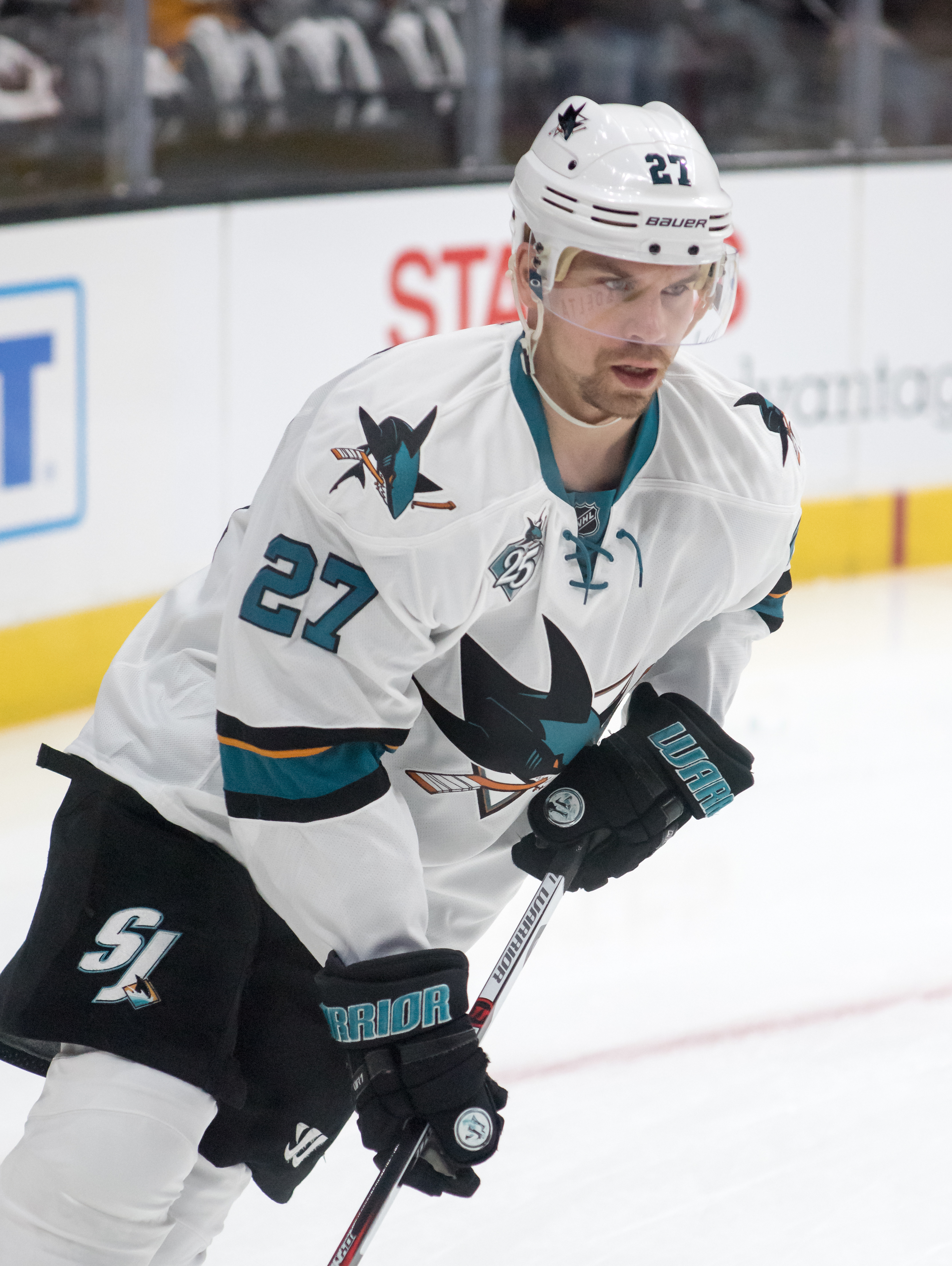
Joonas Donskoi scored the game-winning goal in overtime of game three.

Ben Lovejoy started off the scoring in game three at 5:29 of the first period, when his point shot deflected in off Roman Polak. The Sharks tied it at 9:34 on a Justin Braun goal. Midway through the second period, the Penguins took the lead back when Patric Hornqvist tipped in another Lovejoy point shot. In the third period, Nick Bonino high-sticked Joe Thornton, and in the dying seconds of the four-minute power play, Joel Ward fired a slap shot past Matt Murray to tie the game. In overtime, Joonas Donskoi roofed a tough-angle shot over Murray's shoulder for the game winner.

Scoring summary
Period	Team	Goal	Assist(s)	Time	Score
1st	PIT	Ben Lovejoy (2)	Unassisted	05:29	1–0 PIT
1st	SJ	Justin Braun (2)	Joe Thornton (16) and Marc-Edouard Vlasic (11)	09:34	1–1
2nd	PIT	Patric Hornqvist (8)	Ben Lovejoy (4) and Olli Maatta (6)	19:07	2–1 PIT
3rd	SJ	Joel Ward (7)	Joonas Donskoi (6) and Joe Thornton (17)	08:48	2–2
OT	SJ	Joonas Donskoi (6)	Chris Tierney (3)	12:18	3–2 SJ
Penalty summary
Period	Team	Player	Penalty	Time	PIM
1st	SJ	Joel Ward	High-sticking	02:58	2:00
2nd	PIT	Carl Hagelin	Tripping	10:39	2:00
3rd	PIT	Nick Bonino	High-sticking – double minor	04:48	4:00
OT	None				

Shots by period
Team	1	2	3	OT	Total
Pittsburgh	14	6	13	9	42
San Jose	6	9	7	4	26

=== Game four ===
June 6	Pittsburgh Penguins	3–1	San Jose Sharks	SAP Center	Recap

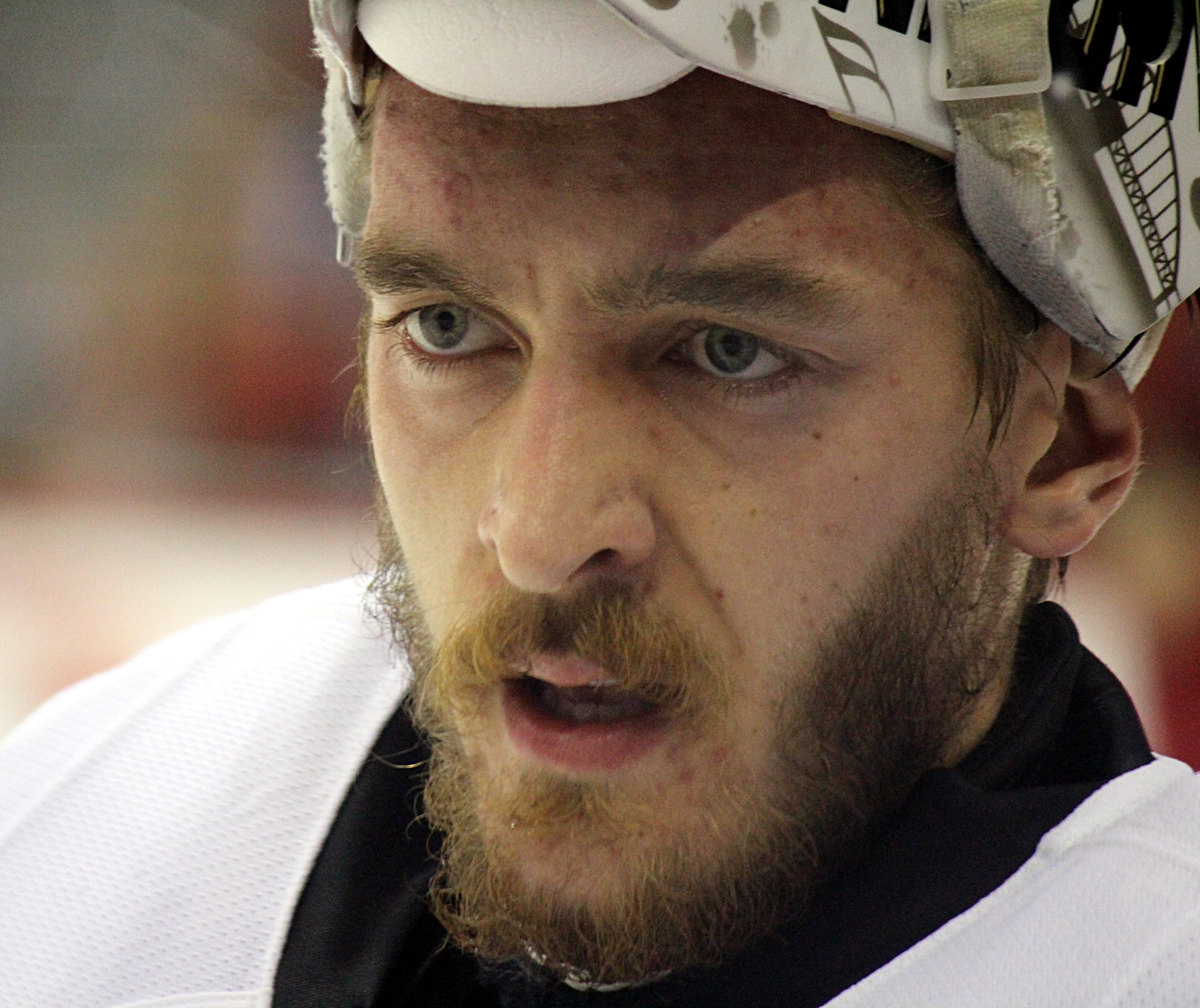
Matt Murray saved 23 of 24 shots faced in game four.

At 7:36 of the first period, Phil Kessel took advantage of a poor Sharks line change and fired a shot that rebounded off Martin Jones and directly to Ian Cole, who scored his first playoff goal. This marked the seventh consecutive game in which the Penguins had scored first. In the second period, Sharks forward Melker Karlsson was called for interference against Eric Fehr, and on the ensuing power play, Evgeni Malkin tipped in a Kessel shot for the Penguins' second goal. During the third period, Karlsson scored to cut the deficit to one, but the Penguins regained a two-goal lead with 2:02 left when Eric Fehr beat Jones on a breakaway.

Scoring summary
Period	Team	Goal	Assist(s)	Time	Score
1st	PIT	Ian Cole (1)	Phil Kessel (10) and Evgeni Malkin (12)	07:36	1–0 PIT
2nd	PIT	Evgeni Malkin (5) - pp	Phil Kessel (11) and Kris Letang (11)	02:37	2–0 PIT
3rd	SJ	Melker Karlsson (4)	Chris Tierney (4) and Brenden Dillon (1)	08:07	2–1 PIT
3rd	PIT	Eric Fehr (3)	Carl Hagelin (10) and Olli Maatta (7)	17:58	3–1 PIT
Penalty summary
Period	Team	Player	Penalty	Time	PIM
1st	SJ	Marc-Edouard Vlasic	Interference	11:37	2:00
1st	PIT	Ben Lovejoy	Holding the stick	14:45	2:00
2nd	SJ	Melker Karlsson	Interference	02:28	2:00
2nd	PIT	Bryan Rust	Hooking	17:33	2:00
3rd	None				

Shots by period
Team	1	2	3	Total
Pittsburgh	6	7	7	20
San Jose	8	4	12	24

=== Game five ===
June 9	San Jose Sharks	4–2	Pittsburgh Penguins	Consol Energy Center	Recap

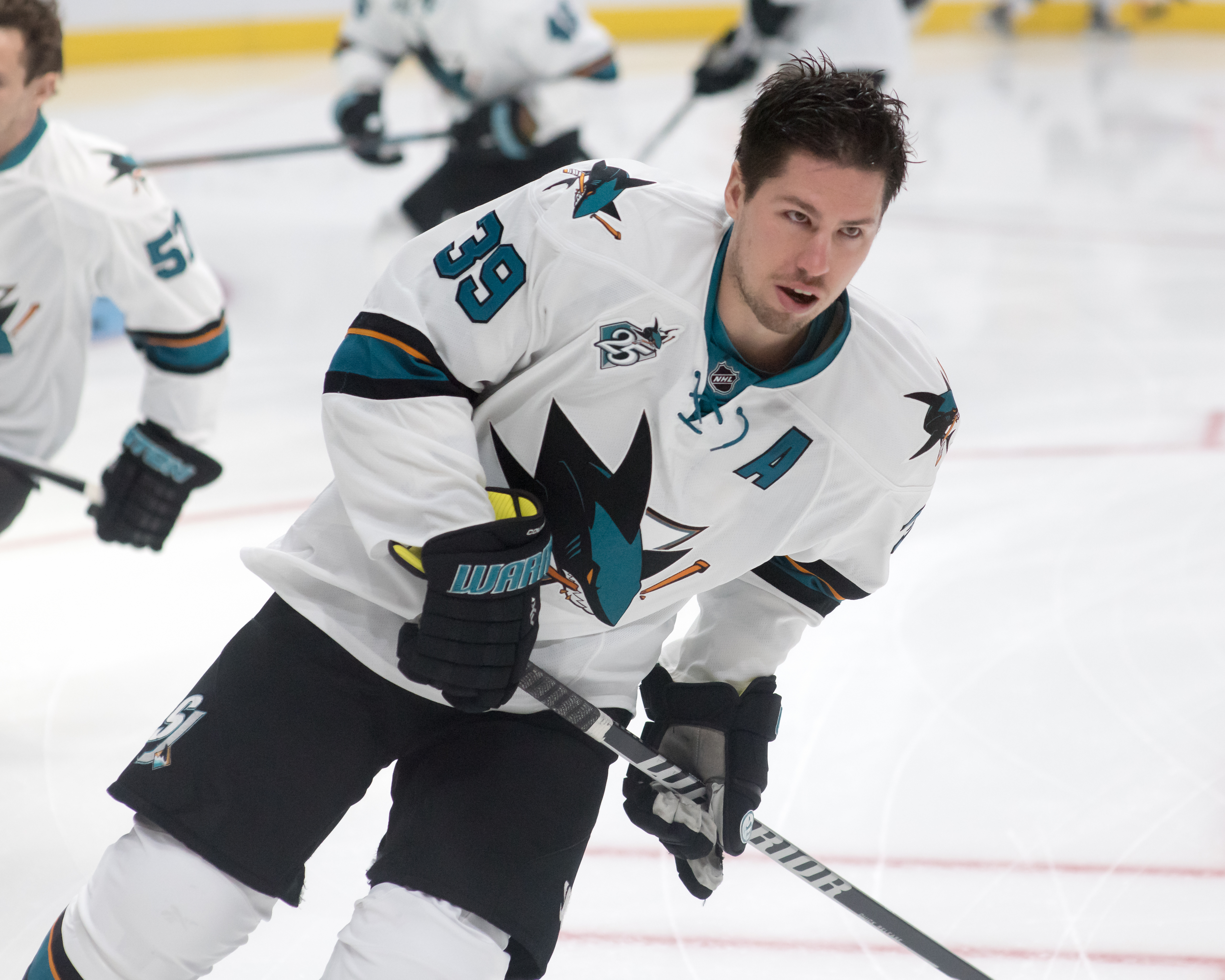
Logan Couture scored three points in game five, adding to his playoff-leading 30-point campaign.

Game five started with four goals scored in the first 5:06 of the game. Brent Burns gave the Sharks their first lead of the Finals at 1:04, slipping it past Murray on the right post. San Jose scored again at 2:53, when Logan Couture deflected in a shot from Justin Braun. Less than two minutes later, Sharks forward Dainius Zubrus got called for delay of game after shooting the puck over the glass. On the ensuing power play, a Malkin shot deflected off Braun's skate and past Jones, cutting the deficit to 2–1. Less than a minute later, Brenden Dillon gave away the puck to Nick Bonino, who took a shot that was deflected in by Carl Hagelin. Later in the first period, during a Pittsburgh power play, a Phil Kessel wrist shot bounced off both posts but stayed out. Later in the period, Dillon passed down low for Couture who sauced a backhand pass to Karlsson, who scored to regain the lead for the Sharks. San Jose took just 15 shots in the second and third period combined, but Jones withstood a massive 46 shots from the Penguins to stave off elimination. Joe Pavelski provided an empty-net goal to force a sixth game.

Scoring summary
Period	Team	Goal	Assist(s)	Time	Score
1st	SJ	Brent Burns (7)	Melker Karlsson (2) and Logan Couture (19)	01:04	1–0 SJ
1st	SJ	Logan Couture (9)	Justin Braun (5)	02:53	2–0 SJ
1st	PIT	Evgeni Malkin (6) – pp	Phil Kessel (12) and Kris Letang (12)	04:44	2–1 SJ
1st	PIT	Carl Hagelin (6)	Nick Bonino (14)	05:06	2–2
1st	SJ	Melker Karlsson (5)	Logan Couture (20) and Brenden Dillon (2)	14:47	3–2 SJ
2nd	None				
3rd	SJ	Joe Pavelski (14) – en	Joe Thornton (18)	18:40	4–2 SJ
Penalty summary
Period	Team	Player	Penalty	Time	PIM
1st	SJ	Danius Zubrus	Delay of game (puck over glass)	04:21	2:00
1st	SJ	Brent Burns	High-sticking	08:18	2:00
2nd	PIT	Bench (served by Phil Kessel)	Too many men on the ice	05:58	2:00
2nd	SJ	Melker Karlsson	Slashing	10:30	2:00
3rd	PIT	Carl Hagelin	Hooking	14:04	2:00
3rd	PIT	Sidney Crosby	Roughing	19:56	2:00
3rd	SJ	Melker Karlsson	Roughing	19:56	2:00

Shots by period
Team	1	2	3	Total
San Jose	7	8	7	22
Pittsburgh	15	17	14	46

=== Game six ===
June 12	Pittsburgh Penguins	3–1	San Jose Sharks	SAP Center	Recap

External videos
- Game 6 Full replay (NHL International's feed) on the NHL's official YouTube channel

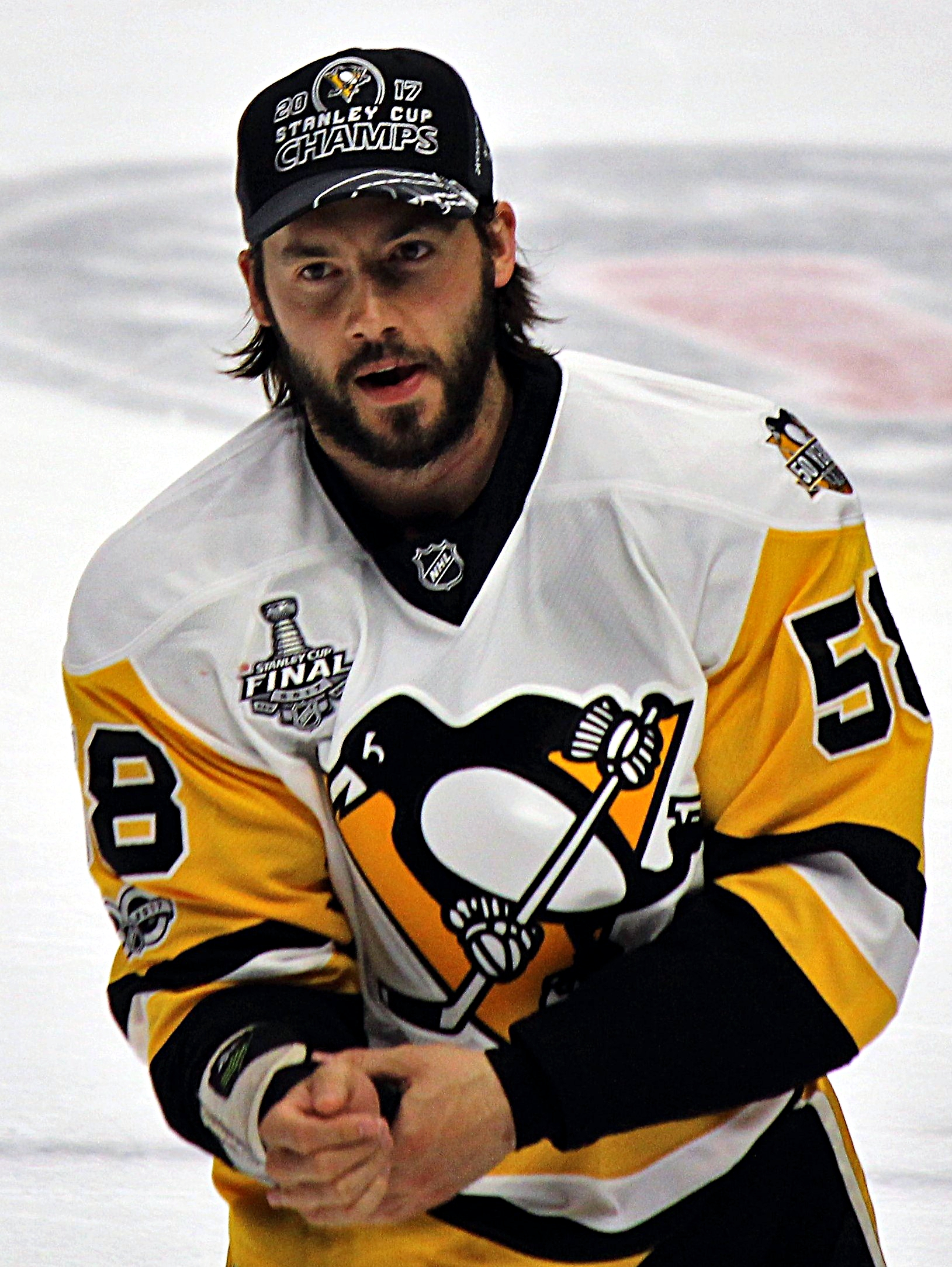
Kris Letang scored the Stanley Cup-clinching goal in game six.

A power play drive from Brian Dumoulin started the scoring early in game six. During the first intermission, a tribute to Gordie Howe was played, as he died on June 10. San Jose tied it up in the second period when Logan Couture took a pass from Melker Karlsson and fired a shot past Murray. Just over a minute later, Pittsburgh regained the lead when a shot by Kris Letang ricocheted off Martin Jones and in. Despite facing elimination on home ice, the Sharks managed only two shots on goal in the third period, and an empty-net goal from Patric Hornqvist sealed the win for Pittsburgh. The Penguins won the fourth Stanley Cup in franchise history, clinching all four on the road.

Scoring summary
Period	Team	Goal	Assist(s)	Time	Score
1st	PIT	Brian Dumoulin (2) – pp	Justin Schultz (4) and Chris Kunitz (8)	08:16	1–0 PIT
2nd	SJ	Logan Couture (10)	Melker Karlsson (3) and Brent Burns (17)	06:27	1–1
2nd	PIT	Kris Letang (3)	Sidney Crosby (12) and Conor Sheary (6)	07:46	2–1 PIT
3rd	PIT	Patric Hornqvist (9) – en	Sidney Crosby (13)	18:58	3–1 PIT
Penalty summary
Period	Team	Player	Penalty	Time	PIM
1st	SJ	Dainius Zubrus	Tripping	07:50	2:00
2nd	None				
3rd	PIT	Conor Sheary	Hooking	05:26	2:00
3rd	SJ	Brent Burns	Slashing	11:02	2:00
3rd	PIT	Eric Fehr	High-sticking	19:50	2:00

Shots by period
Team	1	2	3	Total
Pittsburgh	9	11	7	27
San Jose	4	13	2	19

== Team rosters ==
=== Pittsburgh Penguins ===
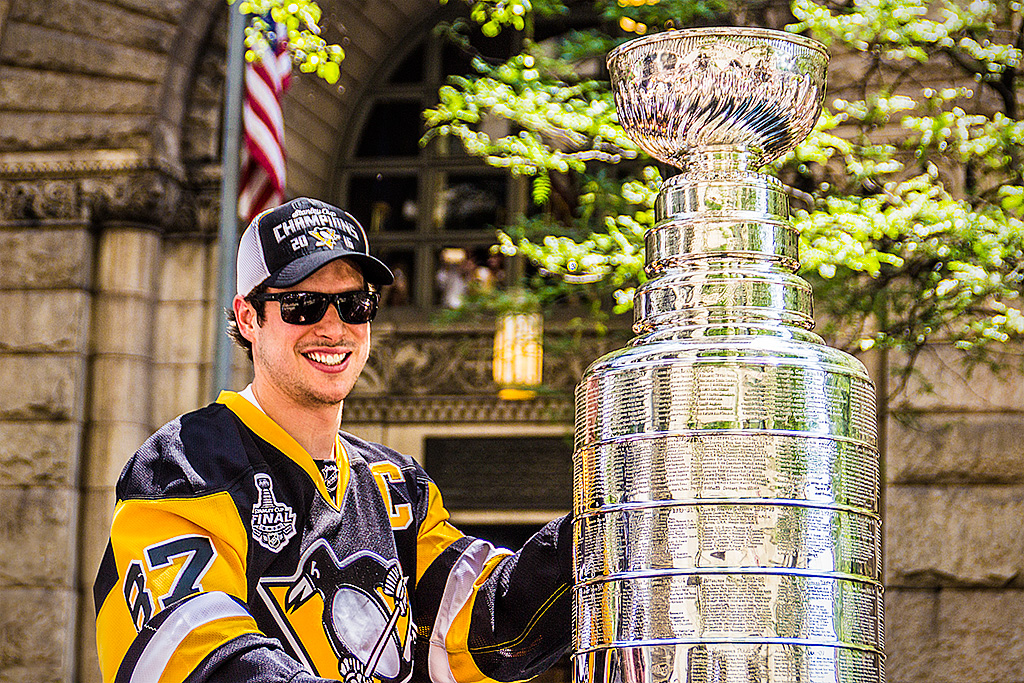
Sidney Crosby captained the Penguins to their second Stanley Cup championship and third Finals appearance in nine seasons

#	Nat	Player	Position	Hand	Age	Acquired	Place of birth	Finals appearance
19	(United States)	Beau Bennett	RW	R	24	2010	Gardena, California	first
13	(United States)	Nick Bonino	C	L	28	2015	Hartford, Connecticut	first
28	(United States)	Ian Cole	D	L	27	2015	Ann Arbor, Michigan	first
87	(Canada)	Sidney Crosby – C	C	L	28	2005	Cole Harbour, Nova Scotia	third (2008, 2009)
7	(United States)	Matt Cullen	C	L	39	2015	Virginia, Minnesota	second (2006)
6	(Canada)	Trevor Daley	D	L	32	2015	Toronto, Ontario	first
8	(United States)	Brian Dumoulin	D	L	24	2012	Biddeford, Maine	first
9	(Canada)	Pascal Dupuis	LW	L	37	2008	Laval, Quebec	third (did not play; 2008, 2009)
16	(Canada)	Eric Fehr	C/RW	R	30	2015	Winkler, Manitoba	first
29	(Canada)	Marc-Andre Fleury	G	L	31	2003	Sorel-Tracy, Quebec	third (did not play; 2008, 2009)
62	(Sweden)	Carl Hagelin	LW	L	27	2016	Södertälje, Sweden	second (2014)
72	(Sweden)	Patric Hornqvist	RW	R	27	2014	Sollentuna, Sweden	first
81	(United States)	Phil Kessel	RW	R	28	2015	Madison, Wisconsin	first
34	(Germany)	Tom Kuhnhackl	LW	L	24	2010	Landshut, Germany	first
14	(Canada)	Chris Kunitz – A	LW	L	36	2009	Regina, Saskatchewan	third (2007, 2009)
58	(Canada)	Kris Letang	D	R	29	2005	Montreal, Quebec	third (2008, 2009)
12	(United States)	Ben Lovejoy	D	R	32	2015	Concord, New Hampshire	first
3	(Finland)	Olli Maatta	D	L	21	2012	Jyväskylä, Finland	first
71	(Russia)	Evgeni Malkin – A	C	L	29	2004	Magnitogorsk, Soviet Union	third (2008, 2009)
30	(Canada)	Matt Murray	G	L	22	2012	Thunder Bay, Ontario	first
51	(Canada)	Derrick Pouliot	D	L	22	2012	Estevan, Saskatchewan	first
17	(United States)	Bryan Rust	RW	R	24	2010	Pontiac, Michigan	first
4	(Canada)	Justin Schultz	D	R	25	2016	Kelowna, British Columbia	first
43	(United States)	Conor Sheary	LW	L	23	2015	Melrose, Massachusetts	first
40	(Sweden)	Oskar Sundqvist	C/RW	R	22	2012	Boden, Sweden	first
37	(United States)	Jeff Zatkoff	G	L	28	2012	Detroit, Michigan	first

=== San Jose Sharks ===
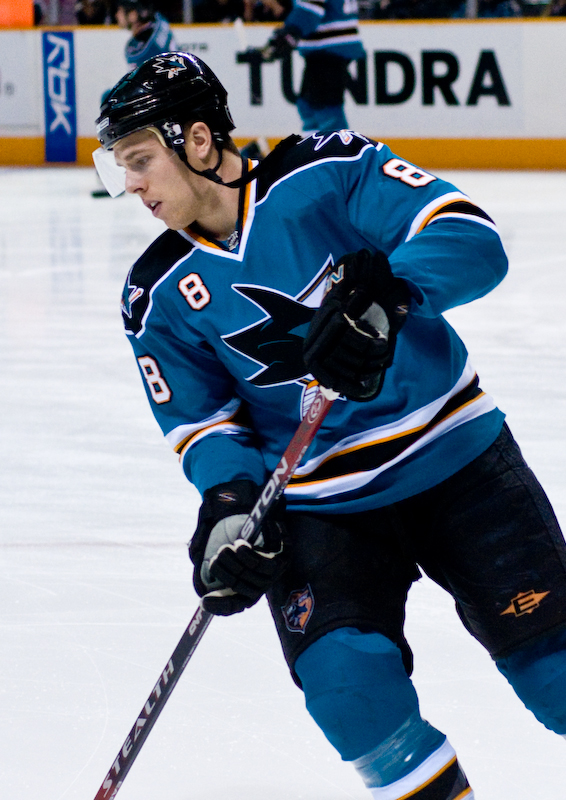
Joe Pavelski captained the Sharks to their first Stanley Cup Final appearance in franchise history.

#	Nat	Player	Position	Hand	Age	Acquired	Place of birth	Finals appearance
61	(United States)	Justin Braun	D	R	29	2007	St. Paul, Minnesota	first
88	(Canada)	Brent Burns	D	R	31	2011	Barrie, Ontario	first
39	(Canada)	Logan Couture – A	C	L	27	2007	Guelph, Ontario	first
4	(Canada)	Brenden Dillon	D	L	25	2014	New Westminster, British Columbia	first
27	(Finland)	Joonas Donskoi	RW	R	24	2015	Raahe, Finland	first
89	(Canada)	Barclay Goodrow	RW	L	23	2014	Toronto, Ontario	first
48	(Czech Republic)	Tomas Hertl	LW	L	22	2012	Prague, Czech Republic	first
31	(Canada)	Martin Jones	G	L	26	2015	North Vancouver, British Columbia	second (2014)
68	(Sweden)	Melker Karlsson	C/RW	R	25	2014	Lycksele, Sweden	first
12	(Canada)	Patrick Marleau	LW	L	36	1997	Swift Current, Saskatchewan	first
7	(United States)	Paul Martin	D	L	35	2015	Elk River, Minnesota	first
83	(United States)	Matt Nieto	LW	L	23	2011	Long Beach, California	first
8	(United States)	Joe Pavelski – C	C/RW	R	31	2003	Plover, Wisconsin	first
46	(Czech Republic)	Roman Polak	D	R	30	2016	Ostrava, Czechoslovakia	first
34	(Canada)	James Reimer	G	L	28	2016	Morweena, Manitoba	first
16	(Canada)	Nick Spaling	C	L	27	2016	Palmerston, Ontario	first
19	(Canada)	Joe Thornton – A	C	L	36	2005	London, Ontario	first
50	(Canada)	Chris Tierney	C	L	21	2012	Keswick, Ontario	first
44	(Canada)	Marc-Edouard Vlasic	D	L	29	2005	Montreal, Quebec	first
42	(Canada)	Joel Ward	RW	R	35	2015	North York, Ontario	first
57	(United States)	Tommy Wingels	RW/C	R	28	2008	Evanston, Illinois	first
9	(Lithuania)	Dainius Zubrus	C/RW	L	37	2015	Elektrėnai, Soviet Union	third (1997, 2012)

== Stanley Cup engraving ==
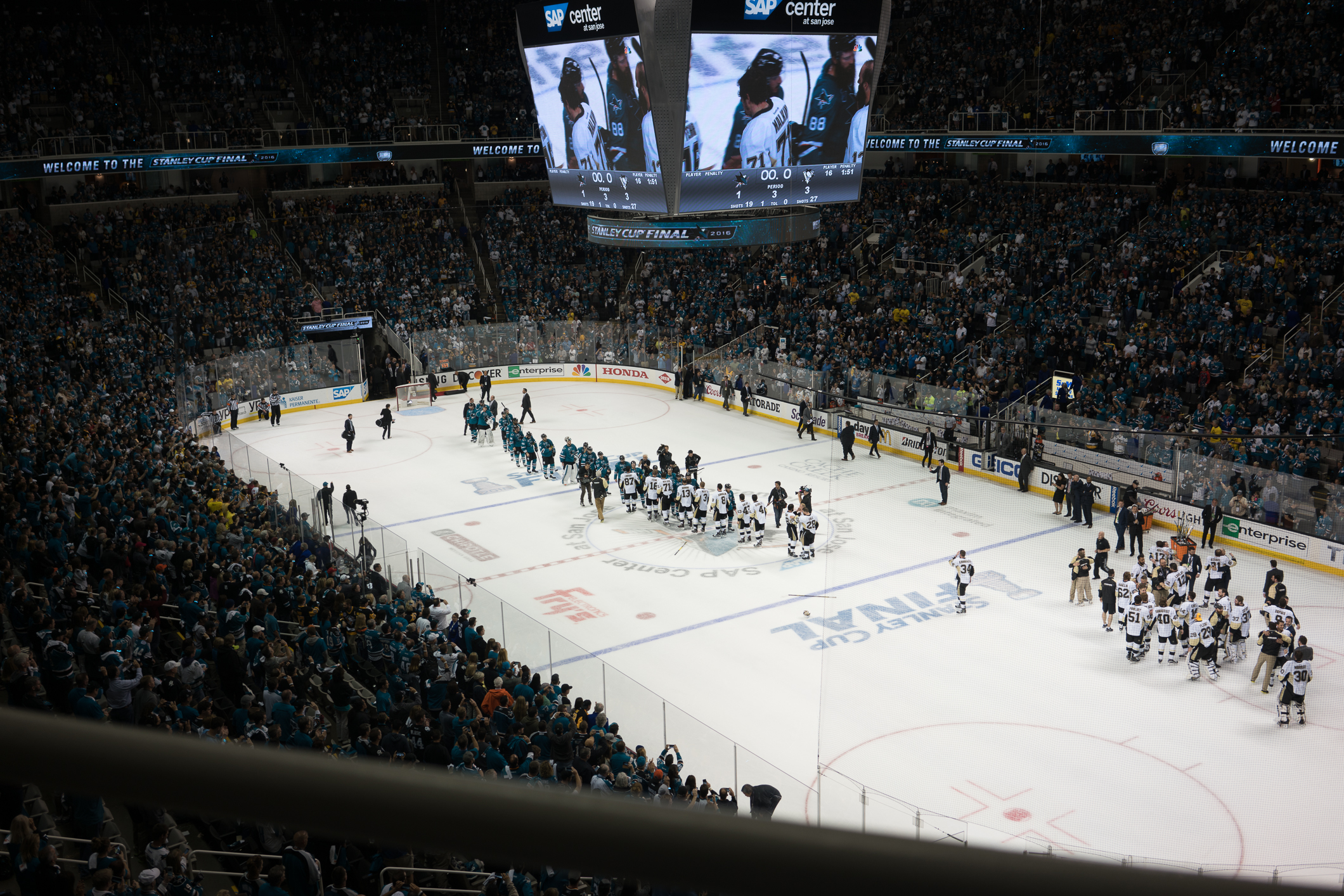
The Penguins and the Sharks shaking hands after Game 6

The 2016 Stanley Cup was presented to Penguins captain Sidney Crosby by NHL Commissioner Gary Bettman following the Penguins' 3–1 win over the Sharks in Game 6.

The following Penguins players and staff had their names engraved on the Stanley Cup

2015–16 Pittsburgh Penguins

=== Players ===
Centres

- 7 Matt Cullen
- 11 Kevin Porter †
- 13 Nick Bonino
- 16 Eric Fehr*
- 71 Evgeni Malkin (A)
- 87 Sidney Crosby (Captain)

Wingers

- 9 Pascal Dupuis ‡
- 14 Chris Kunitz (A)
- 17 Bryan Rust
- 34 Tom Kuhnhackl
- 43 Conor Sheary
- 62 Carl Hagelin
- 72 Patric Hornqvist
- 81 Phil Kessel

Defencemen

- 3 Olli Maatta
- 4 Justin Schultz
- 6 Trevor Daley
- 8 Brian Dumoulin
- 12 Ben Lovejoy
- 28 Ian Cole
- 58 Kris Letang

Goaltenders

- 29 Marc-Andre Fleury
- 30 Matt Murray
- 37 Jeff Zatkoff †
- * Played both centre and wing.
- † Did not play in the Final.
- ‡ Exemption granted to engrave the name of a player who did not automatically qualify. (Note: Automatic qualification for a player's name to be engraved on the Stanley Cup: Playing in (for a goaltender, dressing for) at least one Stanley Cup Final game or at least half of regular season games for the Stanley Cup winning team.)

=== Coaching and administrative staff ===
- Mario Lemieux (Chairman/Co-Owner/Alt. Governor),Ronald Burkle (Co-Owner/Alt. Governor), William Kassling (Co-Owner/Alt. Governor),
- David Morehouse (President/Governor), Travis Williams (Chief Operating Officer/Alt. Governor), Jim Rutherford (Exe. Vice President/General Manager),
- Jason Botterill (Asst. General Manager), Bill Guerin (Asst. General Manager), Jason Karmanos (Vice President of Hockey Operations),
- Mark Recchi (Player Development Coach), Mike Sullivan (Head Coach), Jacques Martin (Asst. Coach),
- Rick Tocchet (Asst. Coach), Mike Bales (Goaltending Coach), Andy Saucier (Video Coach),
- Dr. Dharmesh Vyas (Head Team Physician), Chris Stewart (Athletic Trainer), Curtis Bell (Asst. Athletic Trainer),
- Patrick Steidle (Asst. Athletic Trainer), Andy O'Brien (Director of Sport Science & Performance), Alex Trinca (Strength & Conditioning Coach),
- Dana Heinze (Equipment Manager), Ted Richards (Asst. Equipment Manager), Jon Taglianetti (Asst. Equipment Manager),
- Jim Britt (Director of Team Operations), Dan MacKinnon (Director of Player Personnel), Randy Sexton (Director of Amateur Scouting), Derek Clancey (Director of Pro Scouting).

=== Engraving notes ===
- #9 Pascal Dupuis (RW) only played 18 games and forced to retire on Dec. 8 because of several blood clots – given an injury exemption and included on the Stanley Cup.
- Mario Lemieux is the only one to have his name engraved on the Stanley Cup for their titles in 1991, 1992, 2009 and 2016.
- Pittsburgh broke the 1938 Chicago Black Hawks' record of eight with ten U.S.-born players on a Stanley Cup winning team: Nick Bonino, Ian Cole, Matt Cullen, Brian Dumoulin, Phil Kessel, Ben Lovejoy, Kevin Porter, Bryan Rust, Conor Sheary, and Jeff Zatkoff. An 11th American, Beau Bennett was not included on the cup.
- Pittsburgh included the head team physician for the first time on the Stanley Cup. In 1991, 1992, and 2009 Dr. Charles Burke was not engraved on the Stanley Cup.

=== Player notes ===
- Twelve players on the roster did not have their names engraved on the Stanley Cup due to not qualifying. All players listed below received Stanley Cup rings.

Included in the team picture, but left off the Stanley Cup

- #19 Beau Bennett (RW) – played 33 regular-season games and one playoff game. Bennett missed 48 regular-season games and 15 playoff games due to injury, including the entire Cup Finals, but did play one game in the Conference Finals. No injury exemption was requested.
- #51 Derrick Pouliot (D) – played 22 regular season and two playoff games – did not qualify
- #40 Oskar Sundqvist (C) – played 18 regular season and two playoff games – did not qualify
- #23 Scott Wilson (LW) – played 24 regular season games – did not qualify
- #35 Tristan Jarry (G) – dressed for the first two playoff games, due to Matt Murray, and Marc-Andre Fleury being injured – did not qualify

Not on Stanley Cup or team picture

- #41 Daniel Sprong (RW) – 18 regular season games and none in the playoffs
- #49 Dominik Simon (C) – 3 regular season games and none in the playoffs
- #22 Kael Mouillierat (LW) – 2 regular season games and none in the playoffs
- #45 Josh Archibald (RW) – 1 regular season game and none in the playoffs
- #39 Jean-Sébastien Dea (C) – did not play in the regular season or playoffs
- #44 Tim Erixon (D) – did not play in the regular season or playoffs
- #65 Steve Oleksy (D) – did not play in the regular season or playoffs
- Sergei Gonchar (Defense Coach), Danny Kroll (Asst. Equipment Manager)
- Gilles Meloche was the goaltending coach for Pittsburgh's Cup wins in 1991, 1992, and 2009. His role was changed to Special Assignment Scout, so his name was left off the Stanley Cup in 2016. However, he was awarded his fourth Stanley Cup ring. Other scouts left off the Cup but got rings were pro scouts Al Santili and Ryan Bowness, amateur scouts Colin Alexander, Scott Bell, Brain Fitzgerald, Luc Gauthier, Frank Golden, Jay Heinbuck, Wayne Meier, Ron Pyette, Casey Torres, and Warren Young, and European scouts Patrick Alivin, Petri Pakaslahi, and Tommy Westlund. Many other members of Pittsburgh's staff were also left off the Cup but still received championship rings.

== Television and radio ==
In the U.S., the Final was split between NBC and NBCSN. NBCSN aired two games of the series while NBC aired the other five (if necessary). On May 27, NBC Sports announced that if the series was tied at 1–1 entering game three, then it would have aired on NBC and game four televised on NBCSN. However, if one team led 2–0 (as this eventually happened; Pittsburgh led 2-0), game three moved to NBCSN and then game four on NBC. The games were broadcast nationally on radio via the NBC Sports Radio network.

In Canada, the series aired on CBC Television (through Hockey Night in Canada, as produced by Sportsnet through a brokerage agreement) in English, and TVA Sports in French.

Beginning with this series, the NHL revised the schedule of the Stanley Cup Final. From 2006 to 2015, the Finals typically followed a Monday–Wednesday–Saturday format. However, the NHL decided to alter the format so as to give teams an extra day off upon traveling from one city to another. These two-day layovers took place after Games 2, 4, 5, and 6. The National Basketball Association's championship series followed a similar format beginning that year as well to avoid head-to-head competition against the NHL's Cup Finals.

== Notes ==
Preceded by Chicago Blackhawks; 2015	Pittsburgh Penguins; Stanley Cup champions 2016	Succeeded by Pittsburgh Penguins; 2017
