= Roman Polák =

Czech ice hockey player (born 1986)

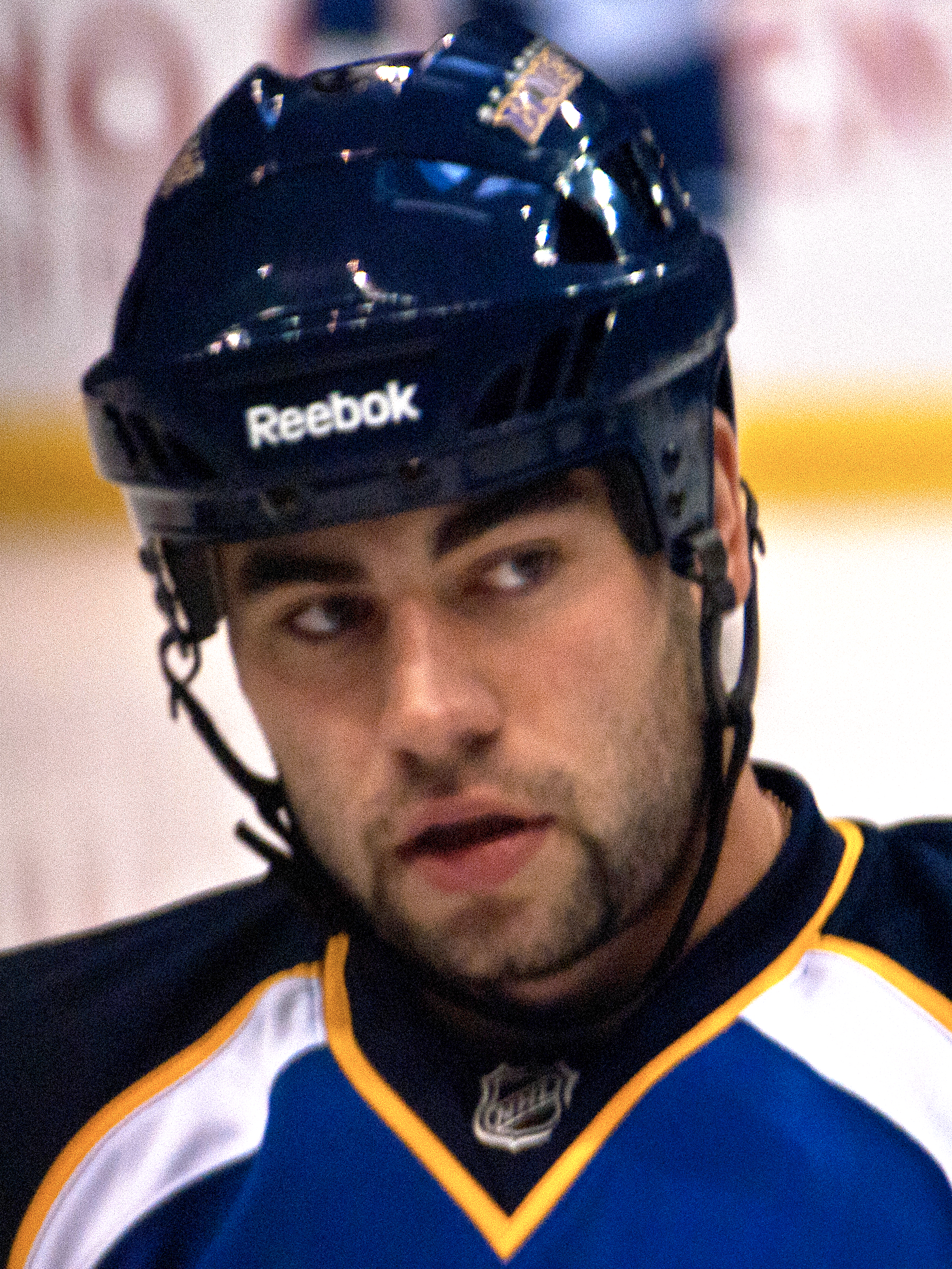
- Polák with the St. Louis Blues in 2011
- Born: 28 April 1986 (age 40) Ostrava, Czechoslovakia
- Height: 6 ft 2 in (188 cm)
- Weight: 235 lb (107 kg; 16 st 11 lb)
- Position: Defense
- Shot: Right
- Played for: HC Vítkovice; St. Louis Blues; Toronto Maple Leafs; San Jose Sharks; Dallas Stars
- National team: Czech Republic
- NHL draft: 180th overall, 2004; St. Louis Blues
- Playing career: 2005–2022

Roman Polák (born 28 April 1986) is a Czech former professional ice hockey defenceman. Polák was drafted in the sixth round, 180th overall, at the 2004 NHL entry draft by the St. Louis Blues, the organization with which he spent his entire NHL career prior to joining the Toronto Maple Leafs in 2014. He rejoined the Maple Leafs in 2016, after a brief stint with the San Jose Sharks. In the 2018 offseason, Polák signed a one-year deal with the Dallas Stars. Polák began and ended his career in his native Czech Republic with HC Vítkovice of the Czech Extraliga (ELH).

== Playing career ==
Polák was drafted in the sixth round, 180th overall, in the 2004 NHL entry draft by the St. Louis Blues. After playing in the Western Hockey League (WHL) in the 2004–05 season with the Kootenay Ice, he returned to his native Czech Republic to make his professional debut with HC Vítkovice of the Czech Extraliga.

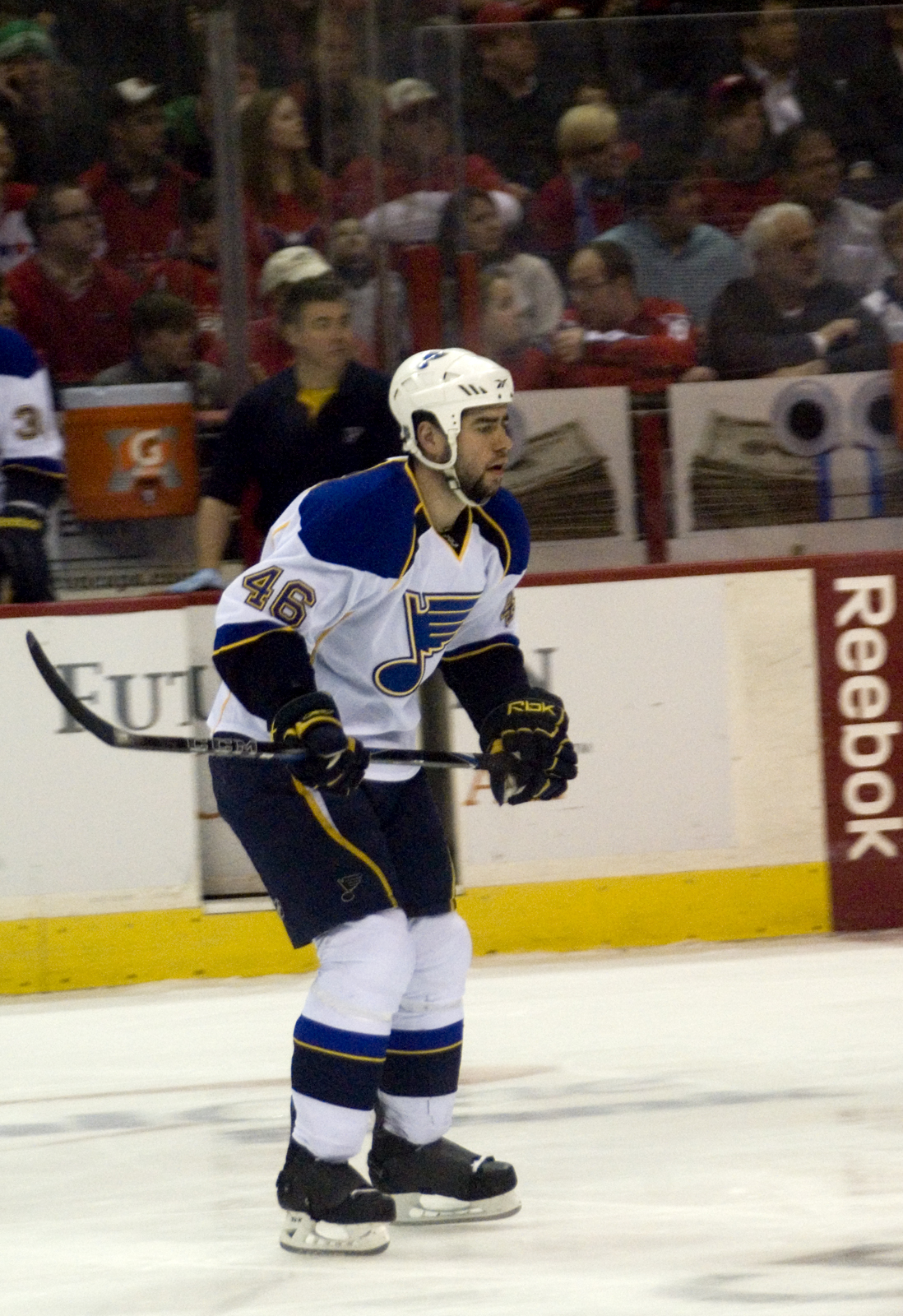
Polak with the Blues in a game against the Washington Capitals during the 2010–11 season

In the 2006–07 season, Polák returned to North America and appeared in his first NHL game on 9 October 2006, against the Anaheim Ducks. After two seasons between the Blues and their affiliate, the Peoria Rivermen, Polák made the starting roster for the Blues in the 2008–09 season.

Polák scored his first NHL goal in his 57th game on 20 December 2008, against the Minnesota Wild. He finished the season with 15 points in 69 games and was re-signed by the Blues to a two-year contract on 24 July 2009. Emerging as a mainstay in the Blues defense and establishing himself as one of the Blues' top defensive defensemen over the next two seasons, Polák was re-signed by St. Louis to a five-year contract extension on 2 June 2011.

On 28 June 2014, Polák was traded to the Toronto Maple Leafs in exchange for defenseman Carl Gunnarsson and a 2014 fourth-round draft pick (Ville Husso). During his first season in Toronto, Polák set a career-high in goals scored (5).

On 22 February 2016, Polák was traded to the San Jose Sharks along with Nick Spaling in exchange for second-round draft picks in 2017 and 2018, as well as forward Raffi Torres. He was part of a Sharks team that made their first appearance in the Stanley Cup Finals, but came up short to the Pittsburgh Penguins, losing 4 games to 2.

On 2 July 2016, Polák returned to the Maple Leafs on a one-year contract. Many considered it a strategic signing, with the rebuilding team anticipated to once again trade Polák for assets at the trade deadline. However the Maple Leafs exceeded expectations and found themselves within the playoff race come the trade deadline, leading to Polák remaining with the team in a bid to make the post-season. On 23 March 2017, Polák was suspended for the first time in his career for two games as the result of a hit from behind on Columbus Blue Jackets forward Oliver Bjorkstrand a few nights earlier. Once he returned, Polák assisted the Maple Leafs in clinching a playoff spot; the first time the team has achieved the feat in a full season since 2004. In game two of the first round vs the Washington Capitals, he was the victim of a knee-on-knee hit from defenceman Brooks Orpik, which resulted in Polák sustaining a lower-body injury that sidelined him for the remainder of the post-season.

On 14 September 2017, Polák signed a professional tryout contract with the hopes of continuing with the Toronto Maple Leafs. He began the 2017–18 as a free agent but remained training with the Maple Leafs. On 22 October 2017, Polák signed a one-year, $1.1 million contract for his fourth season with the Maple Leafs.

On 1 July 2018, Polák signed a one-year, $1.3 million contract with the Dallas Stars. In the 2018–19 season, Polák added a physical presence to the Stars third pairing on the blueline. In 77 games he registered 1 goal and 9 points. In the post-season, Polák had one assist in 13 games to help the Stars advance to the Western Conference Second Round series, which they lost in seven games to his former club, the St. Louis Blues.

On 6 June 2019, Polák opted to continue his tenure in Dallas, agreeing to a one-year, $1.75 million extension. In the 2019–20 season, Polák added veteran depth experience to the Stars' blueline, adding 4 assists through 41 games before the season was suspended due to COVID-19. During the NHL's hiatus, Polák agreed to a three-year contract in his native Czech Republic with his original club HC Vítkovice, beginning from the 2020–21 season on 15 June 2020. On 11 July 2020, Polák was not named to the Stars' training camp roster, opting out in the NHL's Return to Play scheme.

== Career statistics ==
=== Regular season and playoffs ===
			Regular season					Playoffs
Season	Team	League	GP	G	A	Pts	PIM	GP	G	A	Pts	PIM
2002–03	HC Sareza Ostrava	CZE U18	13	5	12	17	26	—	—	—	—	—
2002–03	HC Sareza Ostrava	CZE U20	23	0	1	1	14	—	—	—	—	—
2003–04	HC Vítkovice	CZE U20	52	4	11	15	44	—	—	—	—	—
2004–05	Kootenay Ice	WHL	65	5	18	23	85	9	0	0	0	6
2005–06	HC Vítkovice Steel	CZE U20	1	0	0	0	4	—	—	—	—	—
2005–06	HC Vítkovice Steel	ELH	37	0	1	1	16	6	0	0	0	6
2006–07	St. Louis Blues	NHL	19	0	0	0	6	—	—	—	—	—
2006–07	Peoria Rivermen	AHL	53	4	8	12	66	—	—	—	—	—
2007–08	Peoria Rivermen	AHL	34	0	7	7	33	—	—	—	—	—
2007–08	St. Louis Blues	NHL	6	0	1	1	0	—	—	—	—	—
2008–09	St. Louis Blues	NHL	69	1	14	15	45	4	0	0	0	0
2009–10	St. Louis Blues	NHL	78	4	17	21	59	—	—	—	—	—
2010–11	St. Louis Blues	NHL	55	3	9	12	33	—	—	—	—	—
2011–12	St. Louis Blues	NHL	77	0	11	11	57	9	0	0	0	19
2012–13	HC Vítkovice Steel	ELH	22	2	6	8	79	—	—	—	—	—
2012–13	St. Louis Blues	NHL	48	1	5	6	48	6	0	1	1	2
2013–14	St. Louis Blues	NHL	72	4	9	13	71	6	0	1	1	4
2014–15	Toronto Maple Leafs	NHL	56	5	4	9	48	—	—	—	—	—
2015–16	Toronto Maple Leafs	NHL	55	1	12	13	56	—	—	—	—	—
2015–16	San Jose Sharks	NHL	24	0	3	3	16	24	0	0	0	15
2016–17	Toronto Maple Leafs	NHL	75	4	7	11	65	2	0	0	0	0
2017–18	Toronto Maple Leafs	NHL	54	2	10	12	46	7	0	1	1	4
2018–19	Dallas Stars	NHL	77	1	8	9	69	13	0	1	1	10
2019–20	Dallas Stars	NHL	41	0	4	4	24	—	—	—	—	—
2020–21	HC Vítkovice Ridera	ELH	36	2	5	7	75	5	0	0	0	2
2021–22	HC Vítkovice Ridera	ELH	51	1	7	8	65	3	0	1	1	0
ELH totals			146	5	19	24	235	14	0	1	1	8
NHL totals			806	26	114	140	643	71	0	4	4	54

=== International ===
Medal record

Representing Czech Republic

Ice hockey

World Junior Championships
Bronze medal – third place	2005 North Dakota	

IIHF U18 Championships
Bronze medal – third place	2004 Minsk	

Year	Team	Event	Result	GP	G	A	Pts	PIM
2004	Czech Republic	WJC18	3rd place, bronze medalist(s)	7	0	0	0	8
2005	Czech Republic	WJC	3rd place, bronze medalist(s)	7	0	2	2	4
2006	Czech Republic	WJC	6th	6	0	2	2	6
2009	Czech Republic	WC	6th	7	0	1	1	6
2010	Czech Republic	OG	7th	5	0	0	0	4
2014	Czech Republic	WC	4th	1	0	0	0	0
2016	Czech Republic	WCH	6th	3	0	1	1	0
Junior totals				20	0	4	4	18
Senior totals				16	0	2	2	10
