= Patric Hörnqvist =

Swedish ice hockey player (born 1987)

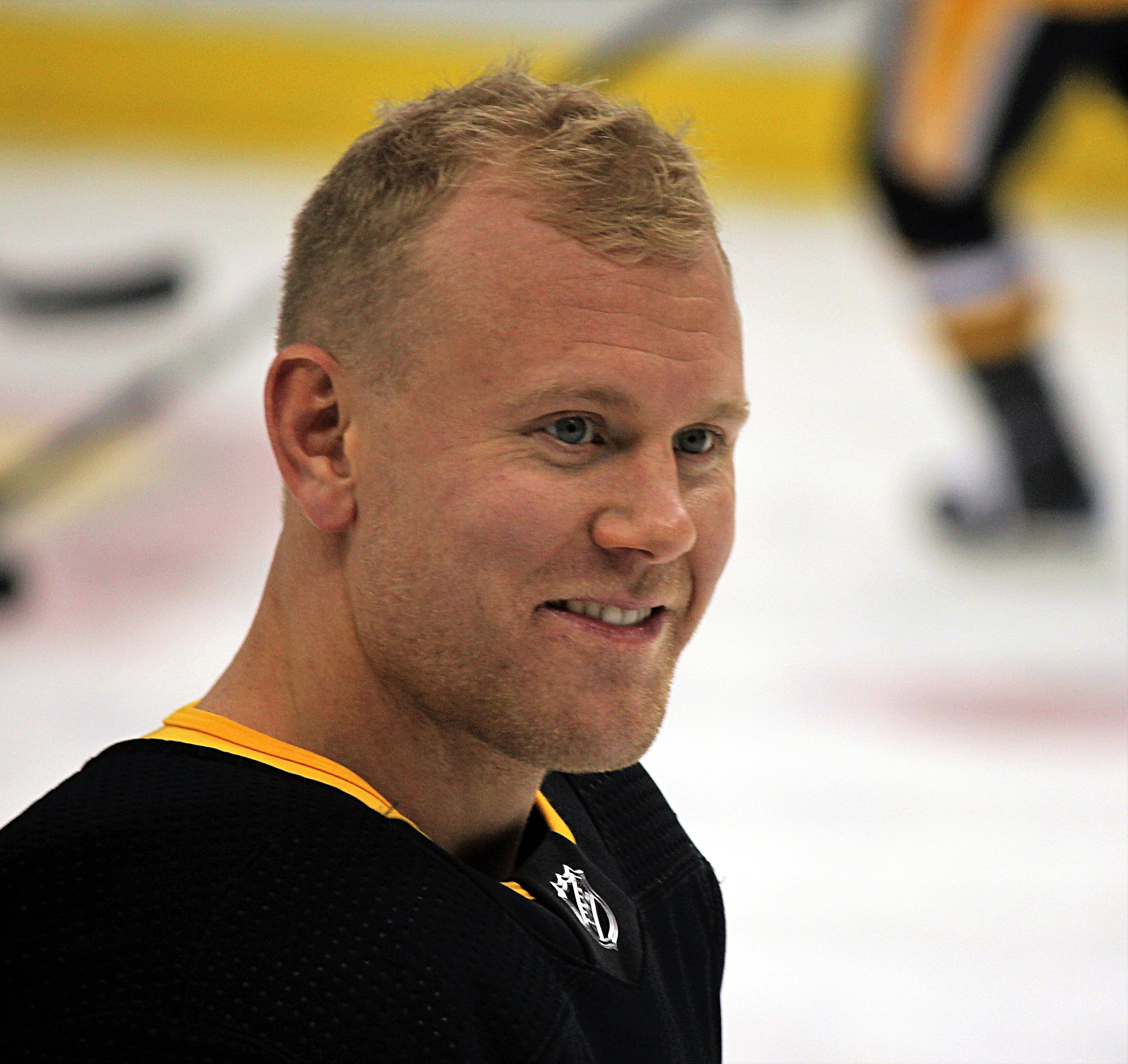
- Hörnqvist with the Pittsburgh Penguins in 2017
- Born: 1 January 1987 (age 39) Sollentuna, Sweden
- Height: 5 ft 11 in (180 cm)
- Weight: 189 lb (86 kg; 13 st 7 lb)
- Position: Right wing
- Shot: Right
- Played for: Djurgårdens IF; Nashville Predators; Pittsburgh Penguins; Florida Panthers
- National team: Sweden
- NHL draft: 230th overall, 2005; Nashville Predators
- Playing career: 2005–2023

Patric Gösta Hörnqvist (pronounced [ˈpɑ̌ːtrɪk ˈhœ̂ːɳkvɪst]; born 1 January 1987) is a Swedish former professional ice hockey player. He played in the National Hockey League (NHL) for the Nashville Predators, Pittsburgh Penguins, and Florida Panthers.

Hörnqvist won his first Stanley Cup championship when the Penguins defeated the San Jose Sharks in six games in the 2016 Stanley Cup Final. In 2017, Hörnqvist scored the Cup-winning goal against his former team, the Predators, as the Penguins repeated as Stanley Cup champions.

== Playing career ==
=== Early career ===
Hörnqvist was born on 1 January 1987 in Sollentuna in Stockholm, Sweden. He began playing hockey in local Sollentuna-club Gillbo IF, and also played minor hockey in Solna SK. Hörnqvist later moved on to play junior hockey in Väsby IK Hockey. He was part of Stockholm/Röd's team in the 2002 TV-pucken and also made some appearances in Väsby's senior team the same season. Hörnqvist played two additional seasons with Väsby, but when head coach Charles Berglund was acquired by Djurgårdens IF in 2004 as assistant coach, Hörnqvist followed.

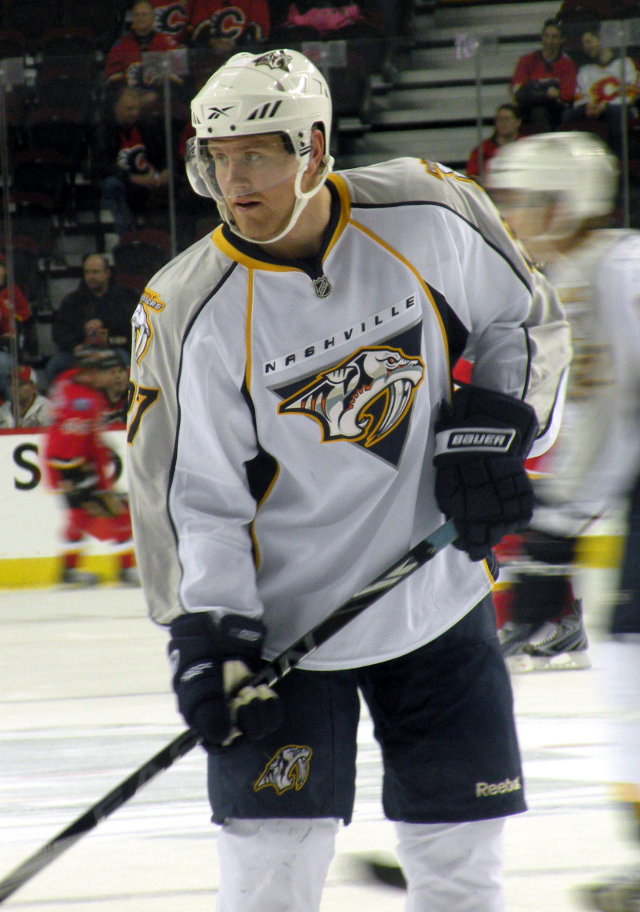
Hörnqvist during his time with the Predators in 2009

He played a few games for Djurgården's J20 team during the 2004–05 season and was drafted by Nashville Predators in the seventh round, 230th and last overall in the 2005 NHL entry draft. Hörnqvist made his Elitserien debut on 26 September against Timrå IK and played 47 games out of 50 during the 2005–06 Elitserien season scoring five goals and seven points. He became the Elitserien Rookie of the Year in 2007 after a successful second season in Djurgården's regular team, scoring 23 goals and 34 points.

Hörnqvist signed on a three-year contract with Nashville in May 2007 but had already chosen to stay for another season in Djurgården during the previous month. He played another good season scoring 18 goals and 30 points in 53 games; and participated in his first Elitserien playoff when Djurgården met Linköpings HC in the quarterfinals. These games did not go well for Hörnqvist; he recorded only one assist, and his team lost the series 4–1.

=== Nashville Predators (2008–2014) ===
Hörnqvist moved to North America for the 2008–09 NHL season in hopes of making the Predators' roster. However, he struggled and was assigned to their minor league affiliate, the Milwaukee Admirals of the American Hockey League (AHL), where he spent most of the year. He scored his first NHL goal on 15 October 2008 against Marty Turco of the Dallas Stars, in one of his 28 NHL games that year. Hörnqvist broke out in the 2009–10 NHL season, leading the Predators in goals (30) and tying for the team lead in points with 51.

After the completion of the Predators' lockout-shortened 2012–13 season, Hörnqvist was re-signed to a five-year contract extension on 30 April 2013.

=== Pittsburgh Penguins (2014–2020) ===
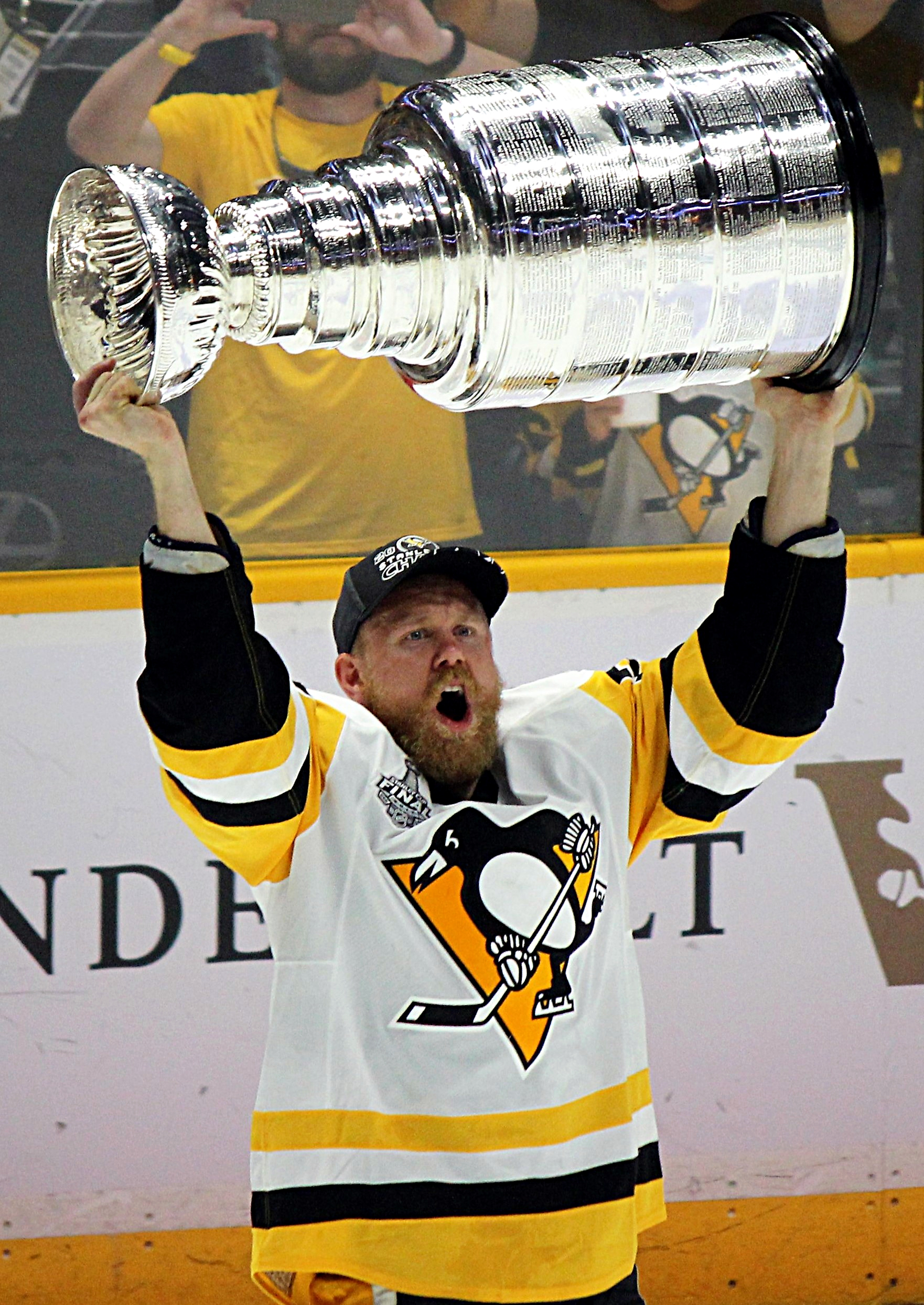
Hörnqvist raising the Stanley Cup in 2017

Hörnqvist, along with Nick Spaling, was traded on 27 June 2014, to the Pittsburgh Penguins in exchange for forward James Neal. This trade united him with Sidney Crosby. Crosby and Hörnqvist were drafted in the same year (2005), but Crosby was drafted first and Hörnqvist last.

As the 2014 season started, Hörnqvist was on the Penguins first line with Crosby and Chris Kunitz. He scored his first goal with the Penguins in his first game against the Anaheim Ducks. After returning from an injury and with additional in-season trades, Hörnqvist was on the first line with Crosby and David Perron.

On 29 February 2016, Hörnqvist recorded his first career hat-trick and added an assist in a 6–0 win over the Arizona Coyotes. On 13 April 2016, Hörnqvist recorded his first career playoff hat-trick and added an assist in a 5–2 win over the New York Rangers. Hörnqvist won his first Stanley Cup when the Penguins defeated the Sharks in six games in the 2016 Stanley Cup Final.

On 11 June 2017, Hörnqvist scored the Stanley Cup-winning goal against his former club the Predators in game six, winning his second consecutive Stanley Cup. Hörnqvist recorded nine points in 19 postseason contests.

On 27 February 2018, Hörnqvist signed a five-year, $26.5 million contract extension with the Penguins that would keep him under contract until the 2022–23 season.

On 4 December, Hörnqvist scored 3 goals within 2:47 minutes to help lead the Penguins 6–3 over the Colorado Avalanche. His hat-trick was the fastest recorded in Penguins history.

=== Florida Panthers (2020–2023) ===
On 24 September 2020, Hörnqvist's six-year tenure with the Penguins ended after he agreed to waive his no-trade clause and was dealt to the Florida Panthers, in exchange for Mike Matheson and Colton Sceviour.

Hörnqvist's 2022–23 season ended when he suffered a concussion on 3 December 2022, after appearing in 22 games and recording three points.

Hörnqvist announced his retirement from his 18 year professional career on 29 June 2023.

Hörnqvist won his third Stanley Cup in 2024 as a scout and development consultant with the Panthers.

== Career statistics ==
=== Regular season and playoffs ===
			Regular season					Playoffs
Season	Team	League	GP	G	A	Pts	PIM	GP	G	A	Pts	PIM
2002–03	Väsby IK	Div.1	6	1	1	2	0	—	—	—	—	—
2003–04	Väsby IK	SWE.3 U20	10	7	10	17	30	—	—	—	—	—
2003–04	Väsby IK	Div.1	32	8	5	13	26	—	—	—	—	—
2004–05	Väsby IK	Div.1	28	12	12	24	36	—	—	—	—	—
2004–05	Djurgårdens IF	J20	5	3	0	3	2	—	—	—	—	—
2005–06	Djurgårdens IF	J20	4	2	1	3	2	4	1	2	3	2
2005–06	Djurgårdens IF	SEL	47	5	2	7	36	—	—	—	—	—
2006–07	Djurgårdens IF	SEL	49	23	11	34	38	—	—	—	—	—
2006–07	Djurgårdens IF	J20	—	—	—	—	—	7	2	5	7	14
2007–08	Djurgårdens IF	SEL	53	18	12	30	58	5	0	1	1	6
2008–09	Milwaukee Admirals	AHL	49	17	18	35	44	11	4	4	8	6
2008–09	Nashville Predators	NHL	28	2	5	7	16	—	—	—	—	—
2009–10	Nashville Predators	NHL	80	30	21	51	40	2	0	1	1	4
2010–11	Nashville Predators	NHL	79	21	27	48	47	12	2	1	3	6
2011–12	Nashville Predators	NHL	76	27	16	43	28	10	1	3	4	2
2012–13	HC Red Ice	NLB	9	7	7	14	8	—	—	—	—	—
2012–13	Djurgårdens IF	Allsv	10	2	3	5	6	—	—	—	—	—
2012–13	Nashville Predators	NHL	24	4	10	14	14	—	—	—	—	—
2013–14	Nashville Predators	NHL	76	22	31	53	28	—	—	—	—	—
2014–15	Pittsburgh Penguins	NHL	64	25	26	51	38	5	2	1	3	2
2015–16	Pittsburgh Penguins	NHL	82	22	29	51	36	24	9	4	13	10
2016–17	Pittsburgh Penguins	NHL	70	21	23	44	28	19	5	4	9	18
2017–18	Pittsburgh Penguins	NHL	70	29	20	49	58	10	5	6	11	22
2018–19	Pittsburgh Penguins	NHL	69	18	19	37	26	4	0	0	0	8
2019–20	Pittsburgh Penguins	NHL	52	17	15	32	36	4	1	1	2	0
2020–21	Florida Panthers	NHL	44	14	18	32	39	6	2	3	5	12
2021–22	Florida Panthers	NHL	65	11	17	28	19	10	1	1	2	4
2022–23	Florida Panthers	NHL	22	1	2	3	13	—	—	—	—	—
SHL totals			149	46	25	71	132	5	0	1	1	6
NHL totals			901	264	279	543	466	106	28	25	53	88

=== International ===
Medal record

Representing Sweden

Men's ice hockey

World Championships
Gold medal – first place	2018 Denmark	

World U18 Championships
Bronze medal – third place	2005 Plzeň	

Year	Team	Event	Result	GP	G	A	Pts	PIM
2005	Sweden	U18	3rd place, bronze medalist(s)	7	1	0	1	2
2007	Sweden	WJC	4th	7	1	2	3	4
2007	Sweden	WC	4th	9	6	0	6	12
2010	Sweden	OG	5th	4	1	0	1	4
2012	Sweden	WC	6th	3	0	0	0	4
2016	Sweden	WCH	3rd	4	0	2	2	0
2018	Sweden	WC	1st place, gold medalist(s)	5	2	0	2	2
2019	Sweden	WC	5th	8	7	3	10	14
Junior totals				14	2	2	4	6
Senior totals				33	16	5	21	36

== Awards and honours ==
Awards	Year	Ref
NHL
Stanley Cup champion	2016, 2017 (as player); 2024, 2025 (as executive)	
