= Ben Lovejoy =

American ice hockey player (born 1984)

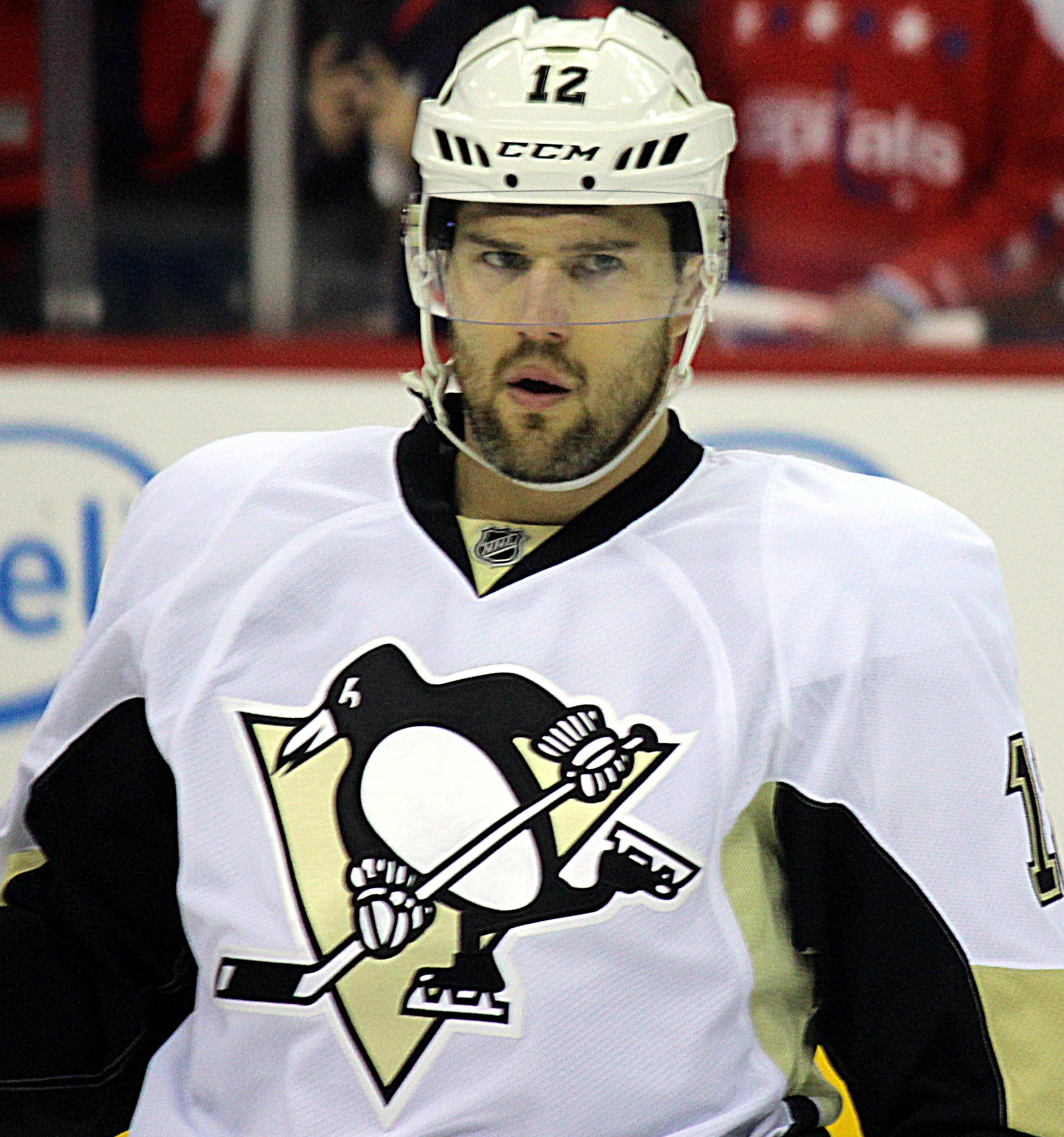
- Lovejoy with the Pittsburgh Penguins in 2016
- Born: February 20, 1984 (age 42) Concord, New Hampshire, U.S.
- Height: 6 ft 2 in (188 cm)
- Weight: 214 lb (97 kg; 15 st 4 lb)
- Position: Defense
- Shot: Right
- Played for: Pittsburgh Penguins; Anaheim Ducks; New Jersey Devils; Dallas Stars
- NHL draft: Undrafted
- Playing career: 2007–2019

Benjamin N. Lovejoy (born February 20, 1984) is an American former professional ice hockey defenseman. He most recently played for the Dallas Stars of the National Hockey League (NHL). He has also played for the Pittsburgh Penguins, the Anaheim Ducks and the New Jersey Devils.

His nickname "The Reverend" comes from The Simpsons character Reverend Lovejoy.

== Playing career ==
=== Amateur ===
As a youth, Lovejoy played in the 1998 Quebec International Pee-Wee Hockey Tournament with the Middlesex Islanders minor ice hockey team.

Lovejoy played hockey at Cardigan Mountain School in Canaan, New Hampshire and then at Deerfield Academy in Deerfield, Massachusetts.

Undrafted by an NHL team, Lovejoy played one year for Boston College and three years for Dartmouth College of the NCAA's Hockey East and ECAC conferences, respectively. During his third year of collegiate hockey, he was offered a professional contract by the Montreal Canadiens, though he declined the offer in order to finish his degree and develop further as a player. Lovejoy also played lacrosse at Dartmouth, earning All-Ivy honors in 2006. He graduated from Dartmouth in 2006.

=== Professional ===
Lovejoy began his professional career immediately after his final collegiate season and played five games with the Norfolk Admirals of the American Hockey League (AHL) to end the 2006–07 season. In the summer of 2007, Lovejoy signed an AHL contract with the Wilkes-Barre/Scranton Penguins, the top minor league affiliate of the Pittsburgh Penguins. He scored his first professional goal at home on March 17, 2008. Lovejoy ended the season with 20 points (two goals and 18 assists) from 72 games and recording a +16 plus-minus rating.

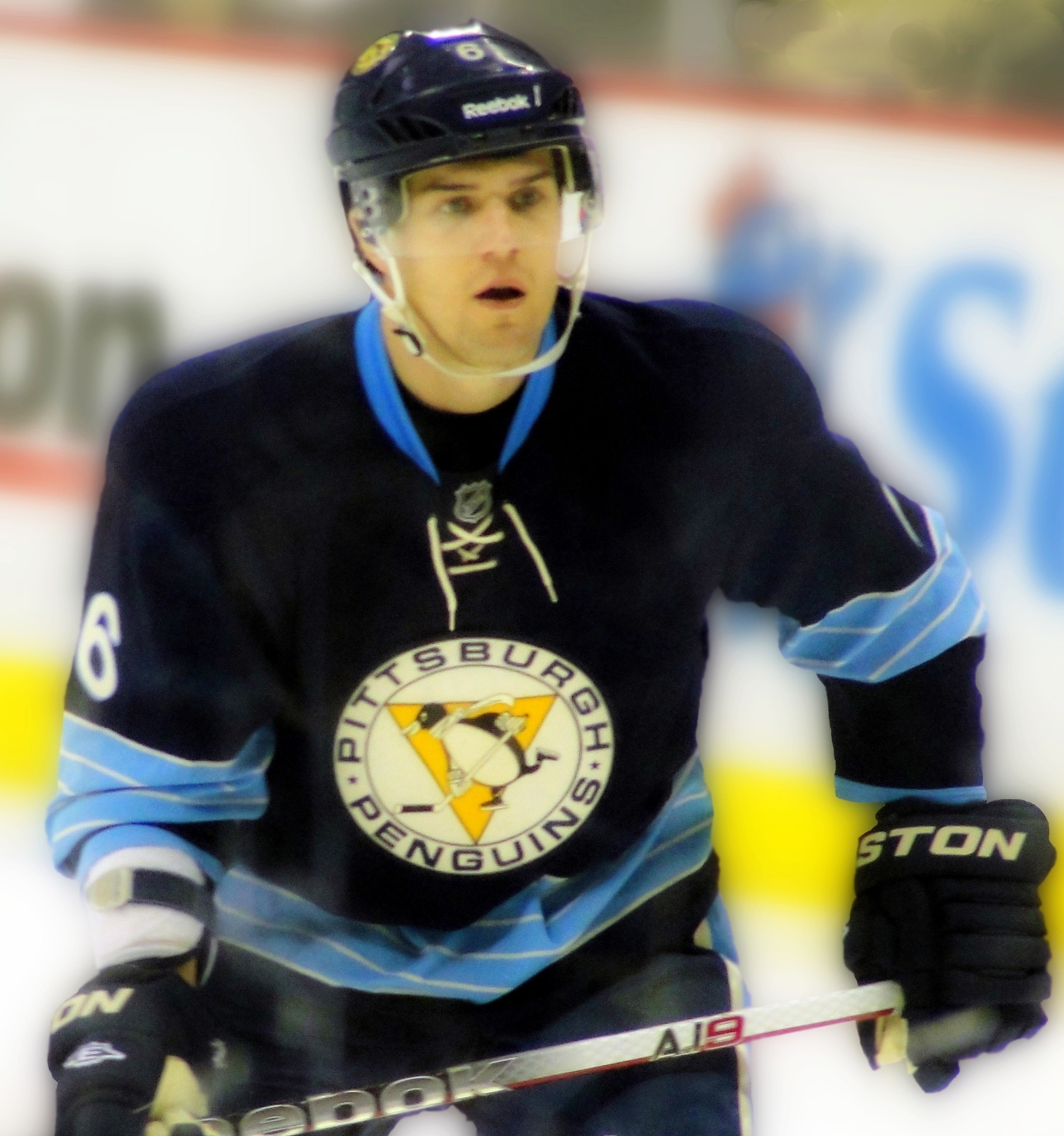
Lovejoy during his first stint with the Penguins in 2011.

On July 7, 2008, Lovejoy signed an NHL contract with the Pittsburgh Penguins. On December 7, 2008, when a replacement was needed for Pittsburgh defenseman Hal Gill, Lovejoy received his first call-up to the NHL. At the time of his recall, he was ranked in the top ten amongst AHL defensemen with 14 points (four goals and ten assists) and placed in the top ten amongst all AHL players in plus minus, with +14 in 24 games. Lovejoy made his NHL debut on December 8, 2008, in a 4–3 loss against the Buffalo Sabres.

Lovejoy was named to the PlanetUSA squad for the 2009 AHL All-Star Classic, which was held January 25 and 26, 2009, at the DCU Center in Worcester, Massachusetts. During the skills competition, he took part in the hardest shot competition.

On April 11, 2009, Lovejoy received the Second Team AHL All-Star Award, as well as being named the League's top defenseman. He ended the regular 2008–09 season leading the entire AHL in plus-minus, with +42. He was called up during the playoffs by Pittsburgh as a spare player. Lovejoy did not play in the playoffs, but was included in the team picture, and awarded a Stanley Cup ring. Lovejoy only played 2 games for Pittsburgh in 2008–09, so his name was not stamped on the Stanley Cup.

Lovejoy notched his first NHL point with an assist during a 6–5 Penguins victory over the Boston Bruins on November 14, 2009. He scored his first NHL goal on December 22, 2010, against Scott Clemmensen of the Florida Panthers. In the same game, he was hit in the face with a puck, causing massive swelling.

Shortly after the beginning of the lockout-shortened 2012–13 season, on February 6, 2013, Lovejoy was traded by the Penguins to the Anaheim Ducks in exchange for a fifth-round draft pick in 2014.

Prior to the beginning of 2013–14 season, Lovejoy, as an unrestricted free agent, re-signed with the Ducks on a three-year contract. On January 3, 2014, Lovejoy scored two first period goals against the Edmonton Oilers. The two goals were scored less than three minutes apart, establishing a new Ducks franchise record for defensemen.

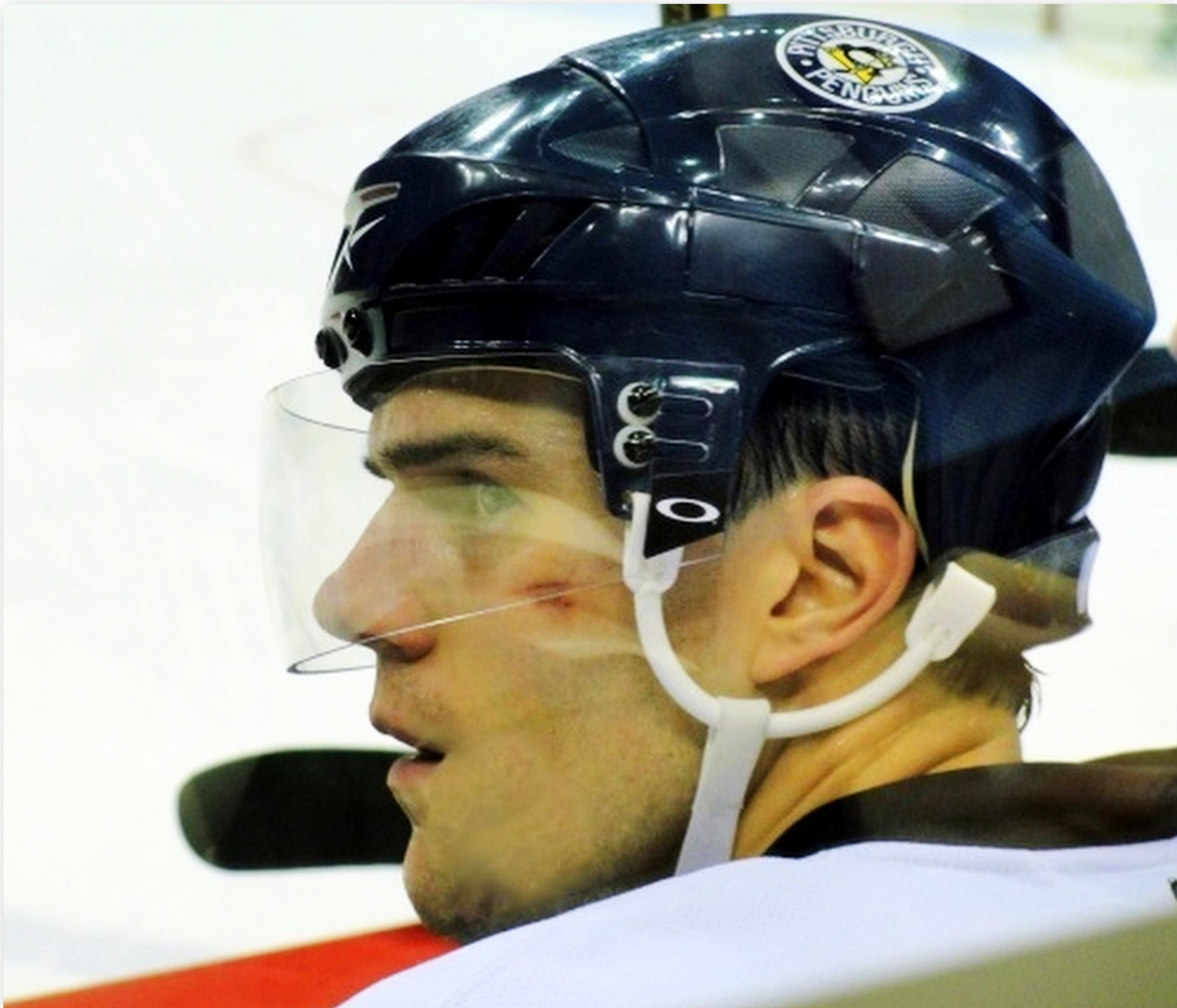
Ben Lovejoy, January 2011

On March 2, 2015, Lovejoy was traded back to the Pittsburgh Penguins in exchange for defenseman Simon Després. In the 2015–16 season, Lovejoy contributed 4 goals and 10 points in 66 games before playing in all 24 post-season games en route to the Penguins' claiming their fourth Stanley Cup. Lovejoy became the first New Hampshire native to win the trophy.

On July 1, 2016, Lovejoy left as a free agent to sign a three-year contract with the New Jersey Devils.

In the final year of his contract with the Devils in the 2018–19 season, Lovejoy appeared in 51 games from the blueline adding 7 points while leading the team in shorthanded icetime. With the Devils out of playoff contention, on February 23, 2019, he was traded to the Dallas Stars in exchange for Connor Carrick and a third-round draft pick in 2019.

On August 29, 2019, Lovejoy announced his retirement from professional hockey on NHL Tonight.

== Post-playing career ==
On August 29, 2019, Lovejoy announced his retirement from professional hockey on NHL Tonight. In 2020, he joined NHL on NBC as a replacement for Jeremy Roenick, who was fired in 2020.

== Personal life ==
Lovejoy married Avery Eyre in 2010. Avery also went to Dartmouth College where she was captain of the squash team. They have three daughters. His parents are Carl and Cari Lovejoy. Ben is the eldest of their three children. His father played hockey for Colby College, and his mother was a two-time All-American and all-time leading-scorer in lacrosse at UMass. She also played field hockey and raced for the UMASS ski team. Cari has been inducted into the UMASS Hall of Fame. Lovejoy has two younger brothers, both of whom played college sports. Brother Nick played hockey and lacrosse for Dartmouth College, and Matt was an All-American lacrosse player for the University of Virginia.

On December 7, 2017, Lovejoy announced he would be donating his brain to concussion research, becoming the first active NHL player to do so.

== Career statistics ==
			Regular Season					Playoffs
Season	Team	League	GP	G	A	Pts	PIM	GP	G	A	Pts	PIM
2000–01	Deerfield Academy	HS-Prep		6	12	18		—	—	—	—	—
2001–02	Deerfield Academy	HS-Prep		11	19	30		—	—	—	—	—
2002–03	Boston College	HE	22	0	6	6	6	—	—	—	—	—
2004–05	Dartmouth College	ECAC	32	2	11	13	28	—	—	—	—	—
2005–06	Dartmouth College	ECAC	32	2	16	18	24	—	—	—	—	—
2006–07	Dartmouth College	ECAC	32	7	16	23	28	—	—	—	—	—
2006–07	Norfolk Admirals	AHL	5	0	0	0	6	—	—	—	—	—
2007–08	Wilkes-Barre/Scranton Penguins	AHL	72	2	18	20	63	23	2	8	10	18
2008–09	Wilkes-Barre/Scranton Penguins	AHL	76	7	24	31	84	12	1	1	2	14
2008–09	Pittsburgh Penguins	NHL	2	0	0	0	0	—	—	—	—	—
2009–10	Wilkes-Barre/Scranton Penguins	AHL	65	9	20	29	92	2	1	2	2	2
2009–10	Pittsburgh Penguins	NHL	12	0	3	3	2	—	—	—	—	—
2010–11	Pittsburgh Penguins	NHL	47	3	14	17	48	7	0	2	2	4
2011–12	Pittsburgh Penguins	NHL	34	1	4	5	13	2	0	0	0	0
2012–13	Pittsburgh Penguins	NHL	3	0	0	0	0	—	—	—	—	—
2012–13	Anaheim Ducks	NHL	32	0	10	10	29	7	0	2	2	0
2013–14	Anaheim Ducks	NHL	78	5	13	18	39	13	2	0	2	8
2014–15	Anaheim Ducks	NHL	40	1	10	11	17	—	—	—	—	—
2014–15	Pittsburgh Penguins	NHL	20	1	2	3	8	5	0	2	2	0
2015–16	Pittsburgh Penguins	NHL	66	4	6	10	30	24	2	4	6	12
2016–17	New Jersey Devils	NHL	82	2	6	8	39	—	—	—	—	—
2017–18	New Jersey Devils	NHL	57	2	6	8	25	5	1	0	1	2
2018–19	New Jersey Devils	NHL	51	2	5	7	33	—	—	—	—	—
2018–19	Dallas Stars	NHL	20	0	2	2	4	13	0	1	1	0
NHL totals			544	20	81	101	287	76	5	11	16	26

== Awards and honors ==
Awards	Year
College
All-ECAC Hockey Third Team	2006–07
NHL
Stanley Cup champion	2016
