= Brenden Dillon =

Canadian ice hockey player (born 1990)

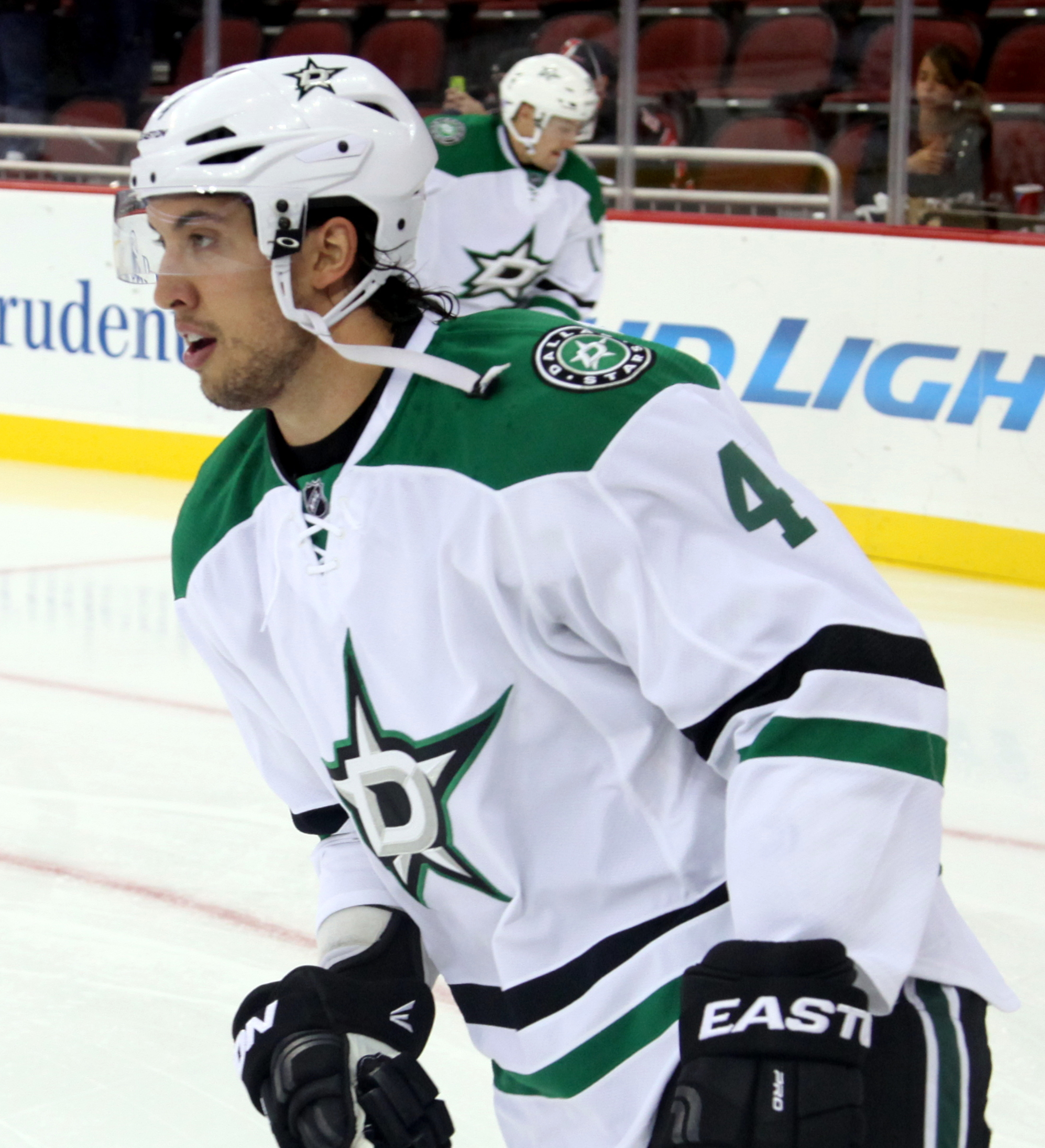
- Dillon with the Dallas Stars in 2014
- Born: November 13, 1990 (age 36) Surrey, British Columbia, Canada
- Height: 6 ft 4 in (193 cm)
- Weight: 225 lb (102 kg; 16 st 1 lb)
- Position: Defence
- Shoots: Left
- NHL team Former teams: New Jersey Devils; Dallas Stars; San Jose Sharks; Washington Capitals; Winnipeg Jets
- National team: Canada
- NHL draft: Undrafted
- Playing career: 2011–present

Brenden Dillon (born November 13, 1990) is a Canadian professional ice hockey player who is a defenceman for the New Jersey Devils of the National Hockey League (NHL). Dillon has previously played in the NHL for the Dallas Stars, San Jose Sharks, Washington Capitals, and Winnipeg Jets. Undrafted, and prior to turning professional, Dillon played four seasons of major junior ice hockey in the Western Hockey League (WHL) with the Seattle Thunderbirds.

== Early life ==
Dillon was born on November 13, 1990, in Surrey, British Columbia, Canada to mother Debbie. His father was born and raised in Portugal before he moved to Toronto, so Dillon can speak French and Portuguese. His younger sister was a beach volleyball player for York University.

== Playing career ==
=== Amateur ===
Growing up in Surrey, British Columbia, Dillon played volleyball, basketball, soccer, and track and field through elementary school and high school. He attended a private Catholic elementary school and was named the top track athlete numerous times for the 100m, 200m, and long jump events. At the age of 15, Dillon began summer training with Impact Hockey Development and earned a spot on the junior B Hope Icebreakers of the Pacific Junior Hockey League (PIJHL). Standing at five-foot-two, Dillon went undrafted in the Western Hockey League (WHL) entry draft and spent one season in the PIJHL before being signed by the Seattle Thunderbirds.

Dillon spent four seasons with the Thunderbirds, collecting 85 points in 271 games. On March 1, 2011, as an NHL free agent, Dillon signed a three-year, entry-level contract with the Dallas Stars.

=== Professional career ===
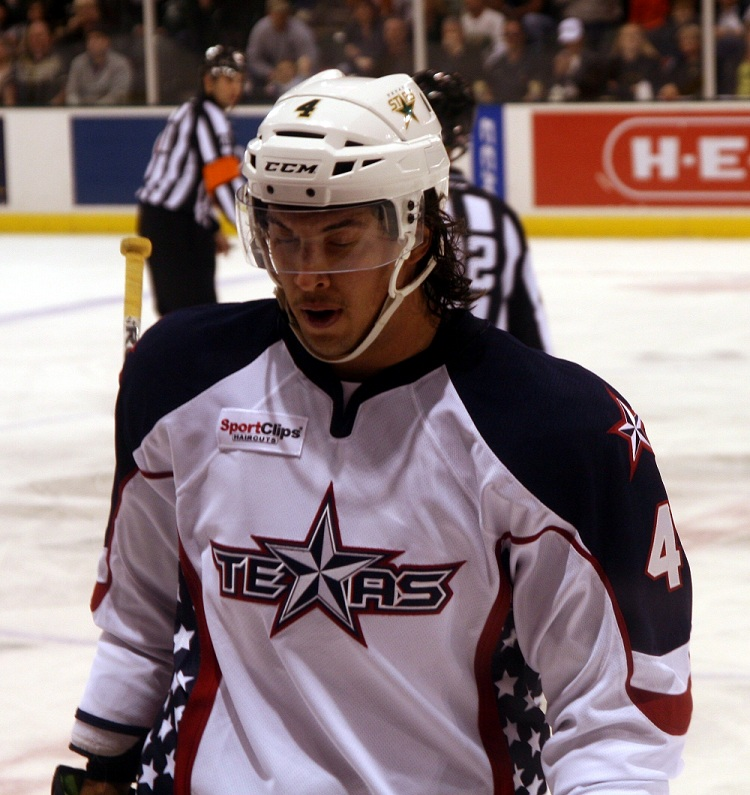
Dillon with the Texas Stars in 2011

==== Dallas Stars ====
After signing his contract with the Stars, he was reassigned to their American Hockey League (AHL) affiliate, the Texas Stars, for the remainder of the 2010–11 season. He played 10 games for the team, accumulating no points and eight penalty minutes. He was invited to the Dallas Stars' training camp prior to the 2011–12 season but was reassigned to Texas on September 28. After playing 31 games for Texas and recording two goals and 11 assists, Dillon was called up to the NHL level to replace an injured Sheldon Souray. He saw no action during his recall and was subsequently reassigned back to Texas. Dillon was called up again for the Dallas Stars' last game of the season and made his NHL debut on April 8, 2012, against the St. Louis Blues. He played in 19:59 of ice time and had a game-high six shots on goal, tied for a game-high four hits and co-led the Stars with three blocked shots. Dillon ended the season with the Texas Stars, tied with Jordie Benn for most assists amongst team defencemen, as the Stars failed to qualify for the Calder Cup playoffs.

Due to the 2012–13 NHL lockout, Dillon began the season with the Texas Stars before joining Dallas once an agreement was reached. On February 1, 2013, Dillon registered his first career Gordie Howe hat trick, meaning he recorded a fight, assist, and goal. During that game, he also registered his first career assist and goal in a 4–3 shootout win against the Phoenix Coyotes. Dillon was also selected for his first international appearance with Canada in the 2013 IIHF World Championship. He scored one goal in eight games as Canada would lose in the quarterfinal to the eventual tournament champions Sweden.

The following season, Dillon spent his entire 2013–14 campaign with the Stars and set new career highs. He finished the season with 17 points in 80 regular seasons games and his plus-minus rating ranked fourth amongst all NHL defencemen. The two games he missed during the season was due to a lower-body injury. On October 2, 2014, Dillon signed a one-year contract extension to remain with the Stars through the 2014–15 season. Since his rookie season, Dillon was paired with Stephane Robidas on the left side, but once the player was traded to the Anaheim Ducks, Dillon was moved to the right side.

==== San Jose Sharks ====
On November 21, 2014, Dillon was traded to the San Jose Sharks in exchange for defenceman Jason Demers and a third-round pick in the 2016 NHL entry draft. At the time of the trade, Dillon had recorded three assists in 20 games. Upon joining the team, Dillon was paired with veteran Brent Burns and returned to his natural playing side. Dillon finished the 2014–15 season with the Sharks, recording two goals and seven assists in 60 games. On June 29, 2015, as pending restricted free agent, Dillon signed a five-year, $16.35 million contract extension with San Jose worth an average annual value of $3.27 million per season through to the end of the 2019–20 season. In the first year of his new contract, Dillon recorded 11 points in 79 games.

In his third full season with the Sharks, Dillon broke out offensively and set new career-highs in assists and points. On December 5, 2017, the NHL Department of Player Safety announced that Dillon was suspended one game for slashing Washington Capitals Madison Bowey.

Following the 2018–19 season, Dillon was the recipient of the Sharks' inaugural "Media Good Guy" Award as "a player who handles his media responsibilities with cooperation, honesty, and thoughtfulness, and answers the bell no matter the outcome or situation." He was also the Sharks' nominee for the King Clancy Memorial Trophy as a "National Hockey League player who best exemplifies leadership qualities on and off the ice and who has made a significant humanitarian contribution to his community." His nomination was based on his activism with the Sharks Foundation's Stick To Fitness program and the Sharks Foundation's Blacktop Resurfacing projects.

==== Washington Capitals ====
Following the 2019–20 season, with the Sharks out of playoff contention and playing in the final season of his contract, Dillon was traded to the Washington Capitals in exchange for a 2020 second-round pick and a 2021 conditional third-round pick on February 18, 2020. Upon leaving the Sharks, Dillon ranked ninth in most games in Sharks history and seventh with the most penalty minutes in franchise history. Prior to the trade, Dillon spoke highly of San Jose and emphasized his wish to remain with the team.

On October 6, 2020, Dillon opted to forgo free agency and signed a four-year, $15.6 million contract with the Capitals.

==== Winnipeg Jets ====
On July 26, 2021, Dillon was traded by the Capitals to the Winnipeg Jets in exchange for second-round picks in 2022 and 2023. Later, on December 17, 2021, in his first game against the Capitals since the trade, Dillon scored his first goal as a Winnipeg Jet against his former team.

==== New Jersey Devils ====
After three seasons with the Jets, on July 1, 2024, Dillon signed a three-year, $12 million contract with the New Jersey Devils. In his second season with New Jersey, Dillon played his 1,000th NHL game on December 1, 2025, becoming the 415th player to reach the mark.

== Personal life ==
Dillon has partnered up with HEROS, a non-profit youth hockey organization based out of Western Canada, where he is an ambassador. He helped open an additional HEROS office in his hometown of Surrey, British Columbia.

== Career statistics ==
=== Regular season and playoffs ===
			Regular season					Playoffs
Season	Team	League	GP	G	A	Pts	PIM	GP	G	A	Pts	PIM
2006–07	Hope Icebreakers	PIJHL	45	4	27	31	38	2	0	0	0	0
2007–08	Seattle Thunderbirds	WHL	71	1	10	11	54	12	0	2	2	21
2008–09	Seattle Thunderbirds	WHL	70	0	10	10	68	5	0	1	1	6
2009–10	Seattle Thunderbirds	WHL	67	2	12	14	101	—	—	—	—	—
2010–11	Seattle Thunderbirds	WHL	72	8	51	59	139	—	—	—	—	—
2010–11	Texas Stars	AHL	10	0	0	0	8	6	0	2	2	7
2011–12	Texas Stars	AHL	76	6	23	29	97	—	—	—	—	—
2011–12	Dallas Stars	NHL	1	0	0	0	0	—	—	—	—	—
2012–13	Texas Stars	AHL	37	3	11	14	45	—	—	—	—	—
2012–13	Dallas Stars	NHL	48	3	5	8	65	—	—	—	—	—
2013–14	Dallas Stars	NHL	80	6	11	17	86	2	0	0	0	0
2014–15	Dallas Stars	NHL	20	0	1	1	23	—	—	—	—	—
2014–15	San Jose Sharks	NHL	60	2	7	9	54	—	—	—	—	—
2015–16	San Jose Sharks	NHL	76	2	9	11	61	24	0	2	2	11
2016–17	San Jose Sharks	NHL	81	2	8	10	60	6	0	1	1	4
2017–18	San Jose Sharks	NHL	81	5	17	22	60	10	0	4	4	32
2018–19	San Jose Sharks	NHL	82	1	21	22	61	20	0	2	2	24
2019–20	San Jose Sharks	NHL	59	1	13	14	83	—	—	—	—	—
2019–20	Washington Capitals	NHL	10	0	0	0	21	8	0	1	1	8
2020–21	Washington Capitals	NHL	56	2	17	19	49	5	1	0	1	0
2021–22	Winnipeg Jets	NHL	79	3	17	20	67	—	—	—	—	—
2022–23	Winnipeg Jets	NHL	82	2	21	23	76	5	0	1	1	9
2023–24	Winnipeg Jets	NHL	77	8	12	20	92	3	0	3	3	4
2024–25	New Jersey Devils	NHL	82	2	14	16	67	1	0	0	0	0
2025–26	New Jersey Devils	NHL	82	3	12	15	89	—	—	—	—	—
NHL totals			1,056	42	185	227	1,014	84	1	14	15	94

=== International ===
Year	Team	Event	Result	GP	G	A	Pts	PIM
2013	Canada	WC	5th	8	1	0	1	0
Senior totals				8	1	0	1	0
