= Conor Sheary =

American ice hockey player (born 1992)

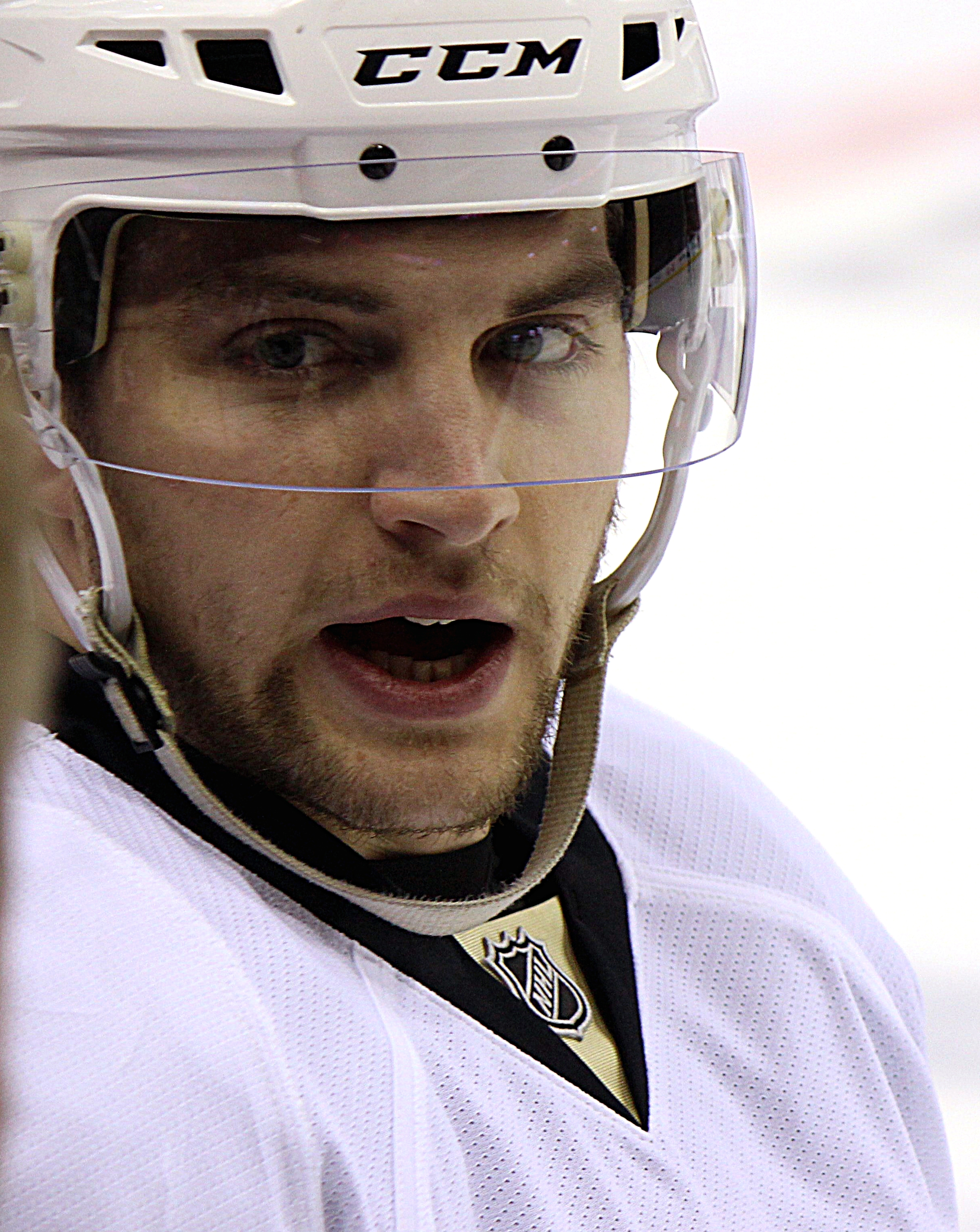
- Sheary with the Pittsburgh Penguins during the 2016 Stanley Cup playoffs
- Born: June 8, 1992 (age 34) Winchester, Massachusetts, U.S.
- Height: 5 ft 9 in (175 cm)
- Weight: 179 lb (81 kg; 12 st 11 lb)
- Position: Winger
- Shoots: Left
- NHL team (P) Cur. team Former teams: Buffalo Sabres; Rochester Americans (AHL); Pittsburgh Penguins; Washington Capitals; Tampa Bay Lightning; New York Rangers
- NHL draft: Undrafted
- Playing career: 2014–present

Conor Michael Sheary (/ˈʃɛəri/ SHAIR-ee; born June 8, 1992) is an American professional ice hockey player who is a winger for the Rochester Americans in the American Hockey League (AHL) while under contract to the Buffalo Sabres of the National Hockey League (NHL). He was signed as an undrafted free agent by the Pittsburgh Penguins in 2014 and won back-to-back Stanley Cups in his first two seasons with the organization. Sheary has also played for the Washington Capitals, Tampa Bay Lightning, and New York Rangers.

== Playing career ==
=== Amateur ===
As a senior at the University of Massachusetts-Amherst, Sheary served as the team’s captain, playing in all 34 games leading the team in points with 28 on nine goals and a squad-best 19 assists. Sheary's collegiate career highs include: 2 Goals – vs. Cornell (12/29/11); 3 Assists – 2x Last at Northeastern (1/4/14); 3 Points – 4x – Last at Northeastern (1/4/14). He became the 12th player in program history to score 100 career points, and graduated as the 10th all time scorer in the UMass history with 104 points.

=== Professional ===
Undrafted, Sheary played collegiate hockey with the University of Massachusetts Amherst of the Hockey East. At the conclusion of his senior season with the Minutemen, Sheary made his professional debut with the Wilkes-Barre/Scranton Penguins of the AHL at the tail end of the 2013–14 season, and remained with the club into the post-season to produce 11 points in 15 games.

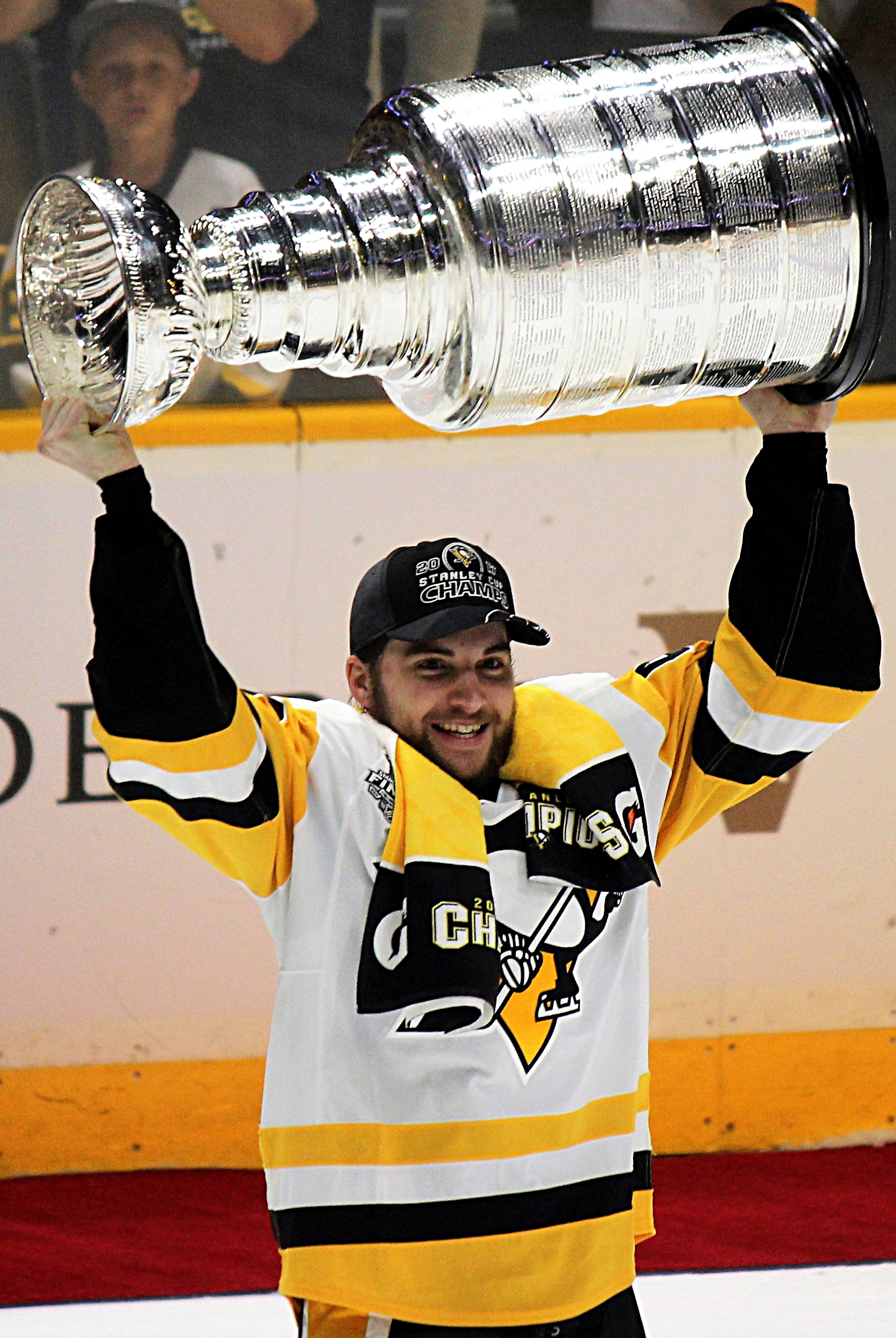
Sheary raises the Stanley Cup in Nashville, 2017.

On July 1, 2015, Sheary was signed to a two-year entry-level contract with the NHL affiliate of Wilkes-Barre, the Pittsburgh Penguins.

==== Pittsburgh Penguins ====
In the following 2015–16 season, Sheary was recalled from the AHL to the Pittsburgh Penguins on December 15, 2015, and made his NHL debut on December 16, 2015, in a 3–0 loss against the Boston Bruins. On December 18, 2015, he scored his first NHL goal on goaltender Tuukka Rask of the Boston Bruins and registered his first NHL assist in the same game.

On March 13, 2016, Sheary recorded his first multi-goal game, scoring 2 goals against the New York Rangers at Madison Square Garden against goaltender Henrik Lundqvist. He would then record his first career playoff goal vs Lundqvist on April 21, 2016. On June 1, 2016, Sheary scored the game-winner, in overtime, to win against the San Jose Sharks 2–1 in the Stanley Cup Final. On June 12, 2016, Sheary won the Stanley Cup with the Pittsburgh Penguins in a 3–1 victory against the San Jose Sharks.

In the 2016–17 NHL season, Sheary continued to play alongside Sidney Crosby for the entire year, getting 23 goals and 30 assists for 53 points. Sheary got his first 3-point game on January 16, 2017, against the Washington Capitals. The Penguins won the game 8–7 in overtime, with Sheary scoring the overtime winner. The Pittsburgh Penguins later went on to win the Stanley Cup, giving Sheary his second Stanley Cup ring.

On July 30, 2017, the Penguins re-signed Sheary to a three-year, $9 million contract worth $3 million annually.

==== Buffalo Sabres ====
On June 27, 2018, Sheary, along with teammate Matt Hunwick, were traded to the Buffalo Sabres for a conditional fourth-round pick in the 2019 NHL entry draft. In doing so, the Penguins cleared over $5 million in salary cap space. In the 2018–19 season, Sheary played in a top-nine forward role, contributing with 14 goals and 34 points through 78 games as the Sabres missed the post-season.

In the following 2019–20 season, his final season before approaching free agency, Sheary continued to play on the third-line, adding 9 goals and 19 points in 55 games.

==== Return to Pittsburgh ====
At the NHL trade deadline, Sheary was re-acquired by the Pittsburgh Penguins along with Evan Rodrigues in exchange for Dominik Kahun on February 24, 2020. Sheary recorded 23 points in 63 games with the Buffalo Sabres and the Penguins during the season but remained unsigned into the offseason.

==== Washington Capitals ====
On December 22, 2020, Sheary signed a one-year, $735,000 contract as a free agent with the Washington Capitals.

On April 14, 2021, Sheary agreed to a two-year, $3 million extension with the Capitals.

==== Tampa Bay Lightning ====
On July 1, 2023, Sheary agreed to a three-year, $6 million contract as a free agent with the Tampa Bay Lightning, hours into the start of the NHL free agency.

In the early stages of the 2024–25 season and having seen his role reduced to a depth forward with the Lightning, Sheary was placed on waivers and cleared to be re-assigned to AHL affiliate, the Syracuse Crunch for the majority of the campaign. Producing 61 points through 59 regular season appearances in the AHL, Sheary, who was looking for an NHL opportunity and unlikely to receive it with Tampa Bay the following season, opted for a mutual termination of the remaining year of his contract and became a free agent after clearing unconditional waivers on June 30, 2025.

==== New York Rangers ====
On July 25, 2025, Sheary signed a professional tryout agreement with the New York Rangers. Just over two months later, on October 6, Sheary signed a one-year contract with the team to open the 2025–26 season. In a depth forward role, Sheary contributed with 7 goals and 11 assists for 18 points through 62 contests.

==== Return to Buffalo ====
As a free agent at the conclusion of his contract with the Rangers, Sheary left as a free agent and returned to the Buffalo Sabres on a one-year, $850,000 contract for the 2026–27 season on July 1, 2026.

== Personal life ==
Conor Michael Sheary was born June 8, 1992, in Winchester, Massachusetts to Kevin and Robin Sheary. He grew up in Melrose, Massachusetts with his two sisters, Caitlin and Courtney. Sheary dated Jordan Sullivan since their years at Cushing Academy in 2008. They became engaged in March 2016 and were married in August 2018. They welcomed their first child, a daughter, in February 2021.

In an interview in November 2017, Sheary admitted that commentators, fans, and players have been mispronouncing his name. His name is pronounced SHARE-ee not SHEER-ee.

== Career statistics ==
			Regular season					Playoffs
Season	Team	League	GP	G	A	Pts	PIM	GP	G	A	Pts	PIM
2007–08	Cushing Academy	USHS	29	2	2	4	12	—	—	—	—	—
2008–09	Cushing Academy	USHS	31	16	27	43	6	—	—	—	—	—
2009–10	Cushing Academy	USHS	31	30	41	71	24	—	—	—	—	—
2010–11	UMass-Amherst	HE	34	6	8	14	12	—	—	—	—	—
2011–12	UMass-Amherst	HE	36	12	23	35	10	—	—	—	—	—
2012–13	UMass-Amherst	HE	34	11	16	27	29	—	—	—	—	—
2013–14	UMass-Amherst	HE	34	9	19	28	2	—	—	—	—	—
2013–14	Wilkes-Barre/Scranton Penguins	AHL	2	0	0	0	0	15	6	5	11	0
2014–15	Wilkes-Barre/Scranton Penguins	AHL	58	20	25	45	8	8	5	7	12	2
2015–16	Wilkes-Barre/Scranton Penguins	AHL	30	7	29	36	4	—	—	—	—	—
2015–16	Pittsburgh Penguins	NHL	44	7	3	10	8	23	4	6	10	8
2016–17	Pittsburgh Penguins	NHL	61	23	30	53	22	22	2	5	7	4
2017–18	Pittsburgh Penguins	NHL	79	18	12	30	10	12	0	2	2	2
2018–19	Buffalo Sabres	NHL	78	14	20	34	12	—	—	—	—	—
2019–20	Buffalo Sabres	NHL	55	9	10	19	8	—	—	—	—	—
2019–20	Pittsburgh Penguins	NHL	8	1	3	4	2	4	0	2	2	2
2020–21	Washington Capitals	NHL	53	14	8	22	14	5	1	0	1	2
2021–22	Washington Capitals	NHL	71	19	24	43	14	6	0	1	1	0
2022–23	Washington Capitals	NHL	82	15	22	37	22	—	—	—	—	—
2023–24	Tampa Bay Lightning	NHL	57	4	11	15	12	—	—	—	—	—
2024–25	Tampa Bay Lightning	NHL	5	0	0	0	4	—	—	—	—	—
2024–25	Syracuse Crunch	AHL	59	20	41	61	23	2	1	0	1	0
2025–26	New York Rangers	NHL	62	7	11	18	14	—	—	—	—	—
NHL totals			655	131	154	285	128	86	7	16	23	18

== Awards and honors ==
Awards	Year	Ref
NHL
Stanley Cup champion		
