= Daniel Girardi =

Canadian ice hockey player (born 1984)

Dan Girardi
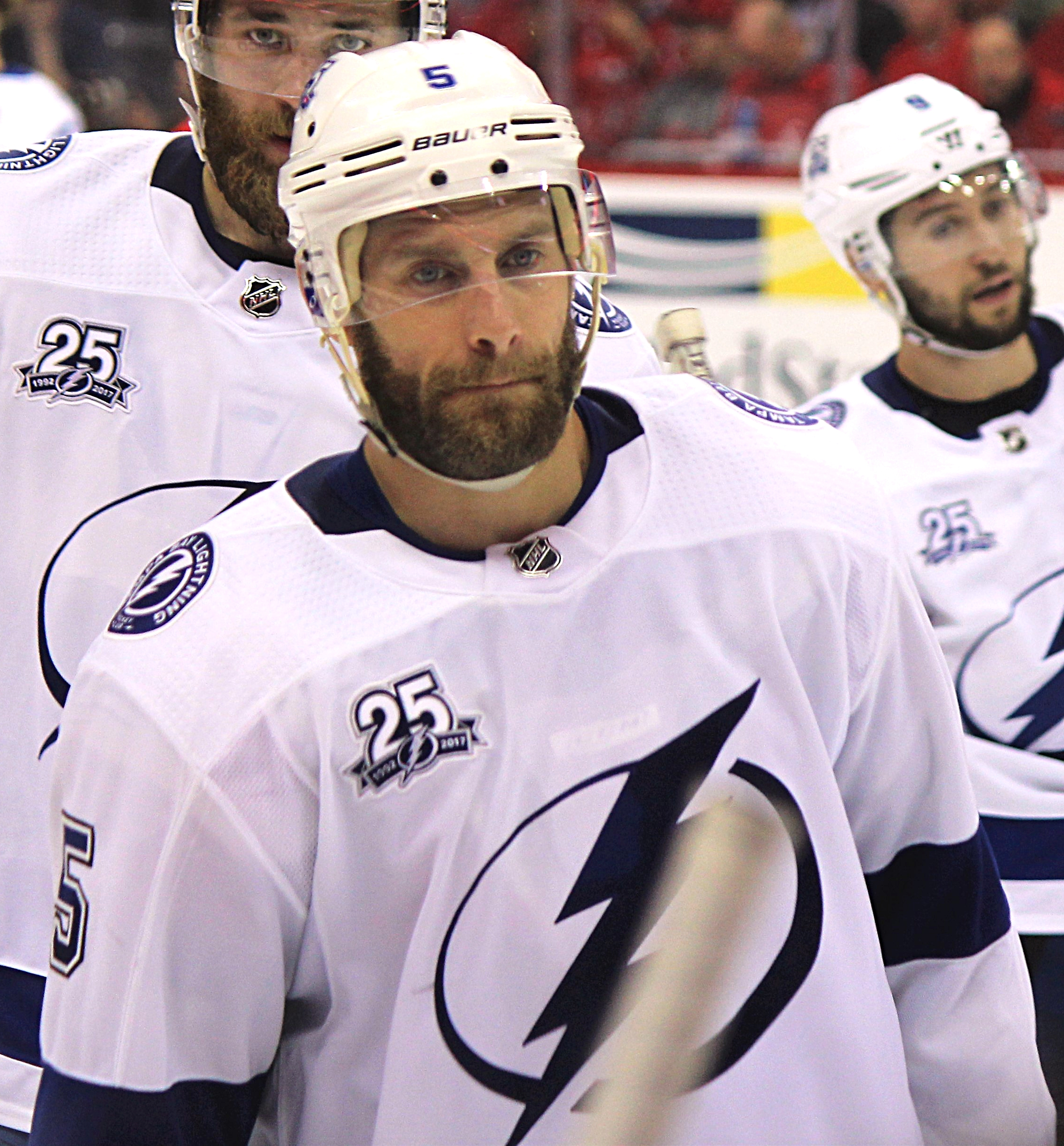
- Girardi with the Tampa Bay Lightning during the 2018 Stanley Cup playoffs
- Born: April 29, 1984 (age 42) Welland, Ontario, Canada
- Height: 6 ft 1 in (185 cm)
- Weight: 206 lb (93 kg; 14 st 10 lb)
- Position: Defence
- Shot: Right
- Played for: New York Rangers; Tampa Bay Lightning
- NHL draft: Undrafted
- Playing career: 2005–2019

Daniel Girardi (born April 29, 1984) is a Canadian former professional ice hockey defenceman. Undrafted, Girardi played 13 seasons in the National Hockey League (NHL) with the New York Rangers and Tampa Bay Lightning as a stay-at-home defenseman. He is currently a development coach for the Buffalo Sabres.

== Early life ==
Girardi was born on April 29, 1984, in Welland, Ontario to Carol and Mark Girardi. He attended Glendale Public School and Welland Centennial Secondary School while competing with the local minor hockey team. As a teenager, Girardi worked as a dishwasher for a local Chinese buffet restaurant.

== Playing career ==
=== Junior ===
Girardi played as a forward at the Atom level but was encouraged to switch to defence once he started Pee-Wee after struggling to score. At the age of 15, Girardi competed with the Junior B Welland Cougars in the Golden Horseshoe Junior Hockey League. He recorded two goal and 16 assists through 47 games with the Cougars and was drafted by Barrie Colts in the 2000 Ontario Hockey League (OHL) Priority Selection. During his first year with the Colts, Girardi split his time between the OHL and the Jr. A Couchiching Terriers.

During an exhibition game before the 2001–02 season, Girardi suffered a lacerated spleen following a hit along the boards. The injury caused him to become jaundiced and lose weight. Girardi missed two-thirds of the season to recover and was limited to only 21 games with the Colts. His injury and limited playing time severely impacted his prospects in the NHL entry draft. Girardi began the 2002–03 season with the Colts but was traded to the Guelph Storm after recording 16 points through 31 games. He spent the remainder of the season with the Storm and was honoured with their Most Improved Player award.

In the 2003–04 season, Girardi was named an assistant captain for Guelph and set new career highs with eight goals and 39 assists. His shutdown defensive methods in the OHL playoffs earned him the attention of New York Rangers scout Rich Brown. Brown was specifically impressed by Girardi's ability to defend against Corey Perry and the London Knights in the Finals. Girardi recorded two goals and 17 assists in the playoffs en route to his first J. Ross Robertson Cup.

Despite impressing the Rangers scout, Girardi went undrafted for a third time and returned to the Storm for the 2004–05 season. He recorded five goals and 20 assists with the Storm before being traded to the Knights in exchange for left winger Rick Steadman and a 2nd round pick in the 2005 OHL Priority Selection. After Girardi and the Knights won the for J. Ross Robertson Cup, Brown invited Rangers director of player personnel to watch his performance against Sidney Crosby in the 2005 Memorial Cup tournament. Brown was further impressed after learning Girardi played the entire playoffs with a broken hand.

=== Professional ===
==== ECHL and AHL ====
Following the Memorial Cup, Girardi was invited to the Rangers 2005 training camp as a free agent. He spent six days at the camp before being cut from the team. Despondent by his lack of success, Girardi considered enrolling at Brock University and playing for the Brock Badgers ice hockey team. However, he was then offered a two-way contract with the Rangers American Hockey League (AHL) affiliate, the Hartford Wolf Pack, and the team's ECHL affiliate, the Charlotte Checkers. He started the 2005–06 season with the Checkers but only played seven games before being recalled to the AHL as an injury replacement. Between February 24 and March 4, Girardi maintained a six-game scoring streak, including four multiple-point games. He spent the remainder of the season in the AHL and finished with eight goals and 30 assists over 63 games. As such, he was named to the American Hockey League All-Rookie Team at the conclusion of the season. As a free agent, Girardi signed a two-way NHL contract with the Rangers on July 1, 2006.

==== New York Rangers (2006–2017) ====
Girardi began the 2006–07 season with the Wolf Pack in the AHL after playing in two exhibition games with the Rangers. By January, Girardi ranked second among all AHL defensemen with 21 points and was named to the 2007 AHL All-Star Classic. However, he was unable to participate in the All-Star Game as he was called up by the Rangers on January 25, following an injury to Darius Kasparaitis. Girardi subsequently made his NHL debut on January 27, in a 2–1 win over the Philadelphia Flyers. He played 11:58 minutes of ice time in the game and earned a minor penalty for interference. Following his debut, Girardi remained in the NHL and was often paired with Wolf Pack teammate Fedor Tyutin as his defensive partner. He recorded his first two NHL points, both assists, on February 17 against the Flyers. Girardi spent the remainder of the regular season with the Rangers and tallied six assists through 34 NHL games. His defensive efforts were recognised by fans who voted him the Rangers' rookie of the year. He also represented the Rangers in the 2007 Stanley Cup playoffs but remained pointless through 10 games. Girardi's defensive efforts were recognized by various teammates, including Brendan Shanahan who described him as one of the team's best defensemen.

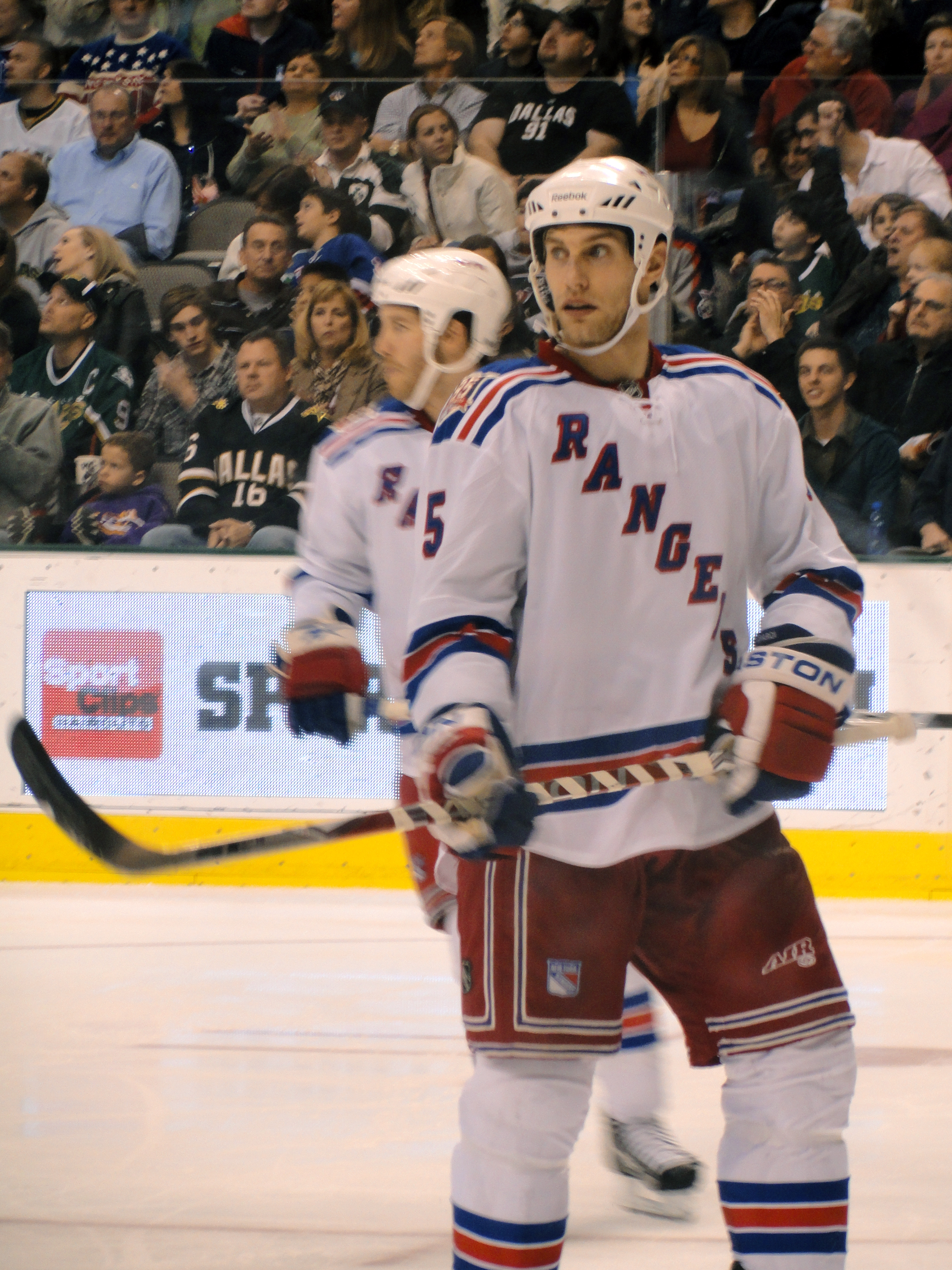
Girardi as a member of the New York Rangers in January 2011.

Shortly after rejoining the Rangers for their 2007–08 season, Girardi scored his first NHL goal on October 18, 2007, against the Atlanta Thrashers. After tallying eight goals and 14 assists through 60 games, Girardi signed a two-year, $3.1 million contract extension with the Rangers on February 17, 2008. He finished the season with 10 goals and 18 assists to rank second among Rangers defencemen in points.

Girardi and the Rangers began the 2008–09 season with a winning 7–2–1 record. By mid-November, Girardi was tied for fifth in points and third in assists among all NHL defencemen. However, the Rangers struggled as the season continued and they fell out of a playoff position with 21 games left in the season. As such, head coach Tom Renney was replaced with John Tortorella in February 2009. Under Tortorella, Girardi shifted away being used in a more offensive role to being used in more "defense-minded" situations. With this method, the Rangers qualified for the 2009 Stanley Cup playoffs and Girardi finished the regular season with four goals and 18 assists. While Girardi and his defensive partner Marc Staal struggled in the playoffs, Tortorella reiterated his confidence in them and described the duo as "the foundation of our back end in the future."

Girardi's defensive struggles continued into the 2009–10 season and he was publicly criticised by Tortorella for his lack of consistency. While Girardi's play began to improve through November, Tortorella split him up from Staal in December. Girardi signed a four-year, $13.3 million contract with the Rangers on July 9, 2010.

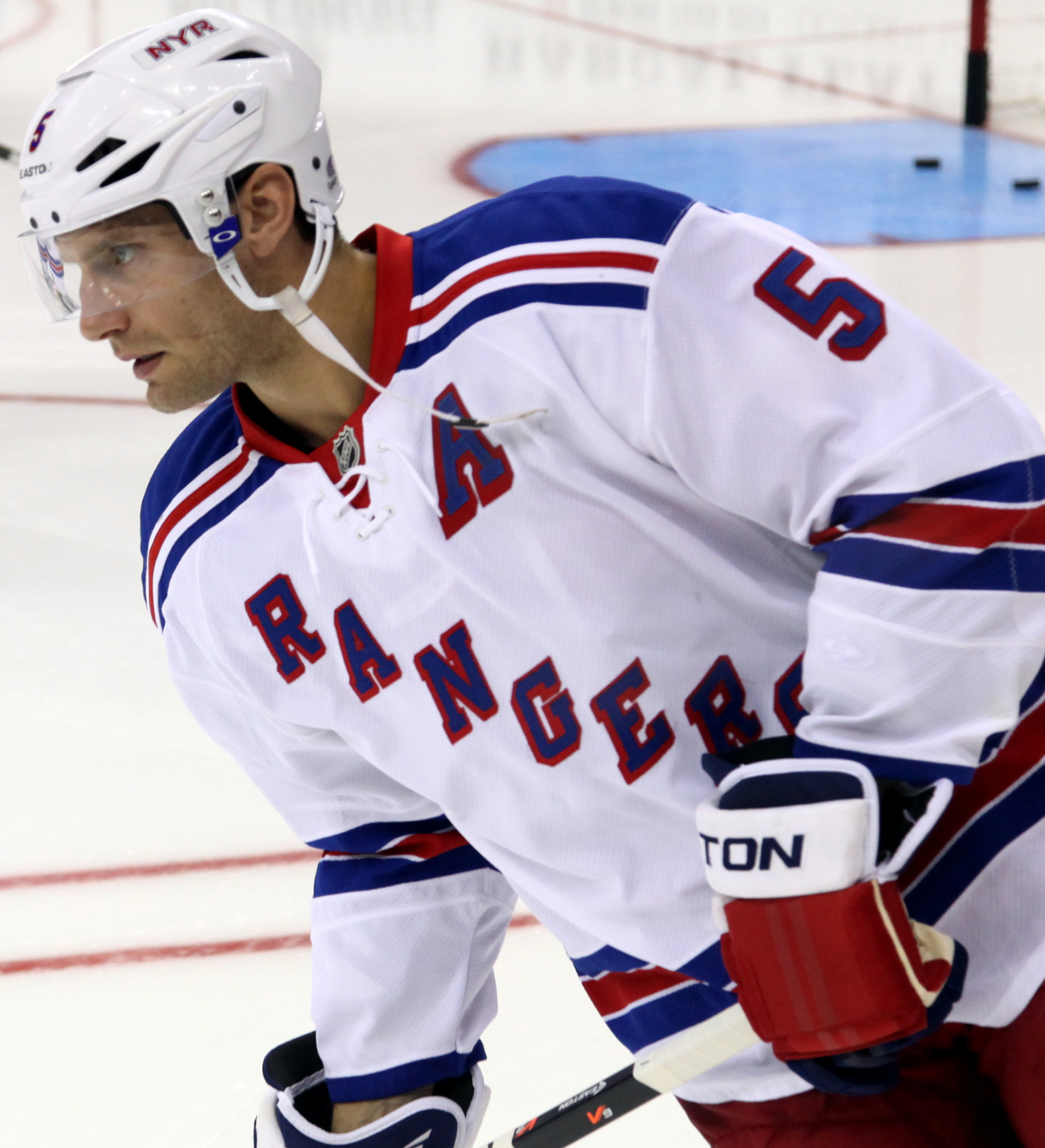
Girardi with the Rangers in October 2014.

For the 2011–12 season, Girardi was named an interim alternate captain for the Rangers while Staal was recovering from post-concussion syndrome. In Staal's absence, Girardi led all NHL skaters in average ice-time, averaging nearly 28 minutes per game. He also mentored sophomore Ryan McDonagh, who replaced Staal as his defensive partner. Although he was originally left off of the 2012 National Hockey League All-Star Game roster, Rangers fans launched a write-in campaign and earned him a roster spot. Girardi scored his first playoff goal on April 26, 2012, against the Ottawa Senators in Game 7 of the 2012 Eastern Conference Quarterfinals to lead the Rangers to the Eastern Conference Finals.

During the 2012–13 lockout-shortened season, Girardi was named an interim alternate captain for the Rangers a second time while Marc Staal was recovering from an injury.

During the 2013–14 season, on February 28, Girardi signed a six-year, $33 million extension with the Rangers. He was named an alternate captain for the Rangers for the remainder of the season when captain Ryan Callahan was traded at the NHL trade deadline to the Tampa Bay Lightning. Girardi's solid defensive play in the playoffs was a key part in the Rangers' run to the 2014 Stanley Cup Final, where they lost in five games to the Los Angeles Kings.

Girardi became a permanent alternate captain during the 2014–15 season, and spent most of the season on the Rangers' top defensive pairing with his former partner Ryan McDonagh. Girardi's solid defensive play that season led to the Rangers winning the Presidents' Trophy, as well as a run to the Eastern Conference Final, where the Rangers lost to the Tampa Bay Lightning in seven games. Girardi suffered an injury in Game 1 of the first round series after taking a puck to the face. In the offseason, Girardi and Staal underwent ankle surgery but were expected to recover in time for the 2015–16 season.

Girardi started the 2015–16 season strong, contributing to a 14–2–2 start to the 2015–16 season for the Rangers. Midway through the season, however, the Rangers production began declining, with many critics blaming Girardi for the slump. He missed the final five games before the NHL paused for the holiday break, and later revealed it was due to a crack in his right kneecap. Although the Rangers qualified for the 2016 Stanley Cup playoffs, they were eliminated in the first round after five games. Girardi played Game 1 of their first round series, but sat out of the next game due to a "whole body injury." Girardi returned to the Rangers lineup for Game 5, where he recorded his only point of the playoffs. Following their elimination, Girardi underwent ankle surgery to fix a bursa excision but was expected to recover in time to participate in the Rangers' 2015 training camp.

Girardi returned to the Rangers lineup for the 2016–17 season but was swiftly reinjured in a mid-October game against the St. Louis Blues. Shortly after recovering, Girardi suffered an illegal hit to the head during a contest against the Boston Bruins but remained in the game. Bruins forward David Pastrňák was later suspended two games for the hit. Due to a decline in play and salary cap considerations, Girardi's contract was bought out by the Rangers on June 14, 2017.

==== Tampa Bay Lightning (2017–2019) ====
On July 1, 2017, Girardi signed as a free agent a two-year, $6 million deal with the Tampa Bay Lightning. Girardi finished the 2017–18 season playing in 77 contests with six goals and 12 assists for 18 points. In game 4 of the second round in the 2018 playoffs against the Boston Bruins, Girardi scored an overtime goal on Bruins' goaltender Tuukka Rask to give the Lightning the win and a 3–1 series lead over the Boston Bruins. The Lightning would eventually defeat the third-seeded Bruins in game five for a 4–1 series victory before getting defeated in seven games by the second-seeded and eventual Stanley Cup champion Washington Capitals in the third round, one win short from reaching the Stanley Cup Final after initially building a 3–2 series lead along the way. Girardi would end the playoffs playing in all 17 games with two goals and an assists for three points recorded.

Girardi recorded four goals and 12 assists for 16 points in 62 games for the 2018–19 season as the Lightning would end the season winning their first Presidents' Trophy as the regular season champions for the first time in franchise history. In the 2019 playoffs, Girardi was held pointless in all four games played as the Lightning would unexpectedly get swept in the first round by the eighth seeded Columbus Blue Jackets.

After going unsigned through the 2019 off-season, Girardi announced his retirement from hockey on September 20, 2019. Girardi retired 30th in playoff games played by a defenceman, and as the all-time leader in shots blocked, having blocked nearly 2,000 shots in his career (the league did not begin tracking blocked shots until 2005).

== Personal life ==
Girardi and his wife Pam have two children together – a son and a daughter.

== Career statistics ==
| | | | Regular season | | | | | Playoffs |
| Season | Team | League | GP | G | A | Pts | PIM | GP | G | A | Pts | PIM |
|---|---|---|---|---|---|---|---|---|---|---|---|---|
| 1999–2000 | Welland Cougars | GHL | 47 | 2 | 16 | 18 | 14 | — | — | — | — | — |
| 2000–01 | Couchiching Terriers | OPJHL | 27 | 1 | 11 | 12 | 27 | — | — | — | — | — |
| 2000–01 | Barrie Colts | OHL | 6 | 0 | 0 | 0 | 0 | — | — | — | — | — |
| 2000–01 | Welland Cougars | GHL | 11 | 1 | 4 | 5 | 4 | 9 | 1 | 3 | 4 | 8 |
| 2001–02 | Barrie Colts | OHL | 21 | 0 | 1 | 1 | 0 | 20 | 0 | 0 | 0 | 0 |
| 2002–03 | Barrie Colts | OHL | 31 | 3 | 13 | 16 | 24 | — | — | — | — | — |
| 2002–03 | Guelph Storm | OHL | 36 | 1 | 13 | 14 | 20 | 11 | 0 | 9 | 9 | 14 |
| 2003–04 | Guelph Storm | OHL | 68 | 8 | 39 | 47 | 55 | 22 | 2 | 17 | 19 | 10 |
| 2004–05 | Guelph Storm | OHL | 38 | 5 | 20 | 25 | 24 | — | — | — | — | — |
| 2004–05 | London Knights | OHL | 31 | 4 | 10 | 14 | 14 | 18 | 0 | 6 | 6 | 10 |
| 2005–06 | Charlotte Checkers | ECHL | 7 | 1 | 4 | 5 | 6 | — | — | — | — | — |
| 2005–06 | Hartford Wolf Pack | AHL | 66 | 8 | 31 | 39 | 44 | 13 | 4 | 5 | 9 | 8 |
| 2006–07 | Hartford Wolf Pack | AHL | 45 | 2 | 22 | 24 | 16 | — | — | — | — | — |
| 2006–07 | New York Rangers | NHL | 34 | 0 | 6 | 6 | 8 | 10 | 0 | 0 | 0 | 4 |
| 2007–08 | New York Rangers | NHL | 82 | 10 | 18 | 28 | 14 | 10 | 0 | 3 | 3 | 6 |
| 2008–09 | New York Rangers | NHL | 82 | 4 | 18 | 22 | 53 | 7 | 0 | 0 | 0 | 6 |
| 2009–10 | New York Rangers | NHL | 82 | 6 | 18 | 24 | 53 | — | — | — | — | — |
| 2010–11 | New York Rangers | NHL | 80 | 4 | 27 | 31 | 37 | 5 | 0 | 0 | 0 | 0 |
| 2011–12 | New York Rangers | NHL | 82 | 5 | 24 | 29 | 20 | 20 | 3 | 9 | 12 | 2 |
| 2012–13 | New York Rangers | NHL | 46 | 2 | 12 | 14 | 16 | 12 | 2 | 2 | 4 | 2 |
| 2013–14 | New York Rangers | NHL | 81 | 5 | 19 | 24 | 16 | 25 | 1 | 6 | 7 | 10 |
| 2014–15 | New York Rangers | NHL | 82 | 4 | 16 | 20 | 22 | 19 | 0 | 4 | 4 | 4 |
| 2015–16 | New York Rangers | NHL | 74 | 2 | 15 | 17 | 20 | 2 | 0 | 1 | 1 | 0 |
| 2016–17 | New York Rangers | NHL | 63 | 4 | 11 | 15 | 16 | 12 | 0 | 2 | 2 | 2 |
| 2017–18 | Tampa Bay Lightning | NHL | 77 | 6 | 12 | 18 | 27 | 17 | 2 | 1 | 3 | 2 |
| 2018–19 | Tampa Bay Lightning | NHL | 62 | 4 | 12 | 16 | 12 | 4 | 0 | 0 | 0 | 4 |
| NHL totals | | | 927 | 56 | 208 | 264 | 314 | 143 | 8 | 28 | 36 | 42 |

== Awards and honours ==
| Award | Year | Ref |
NHL
| NHL All-Star | 2012 | |
AHL
| AHL All-Rookie team | 2006 | |
