= Matt Murray (ice hockey, born 1994) =

Canadian ice hockey player (born 1994)

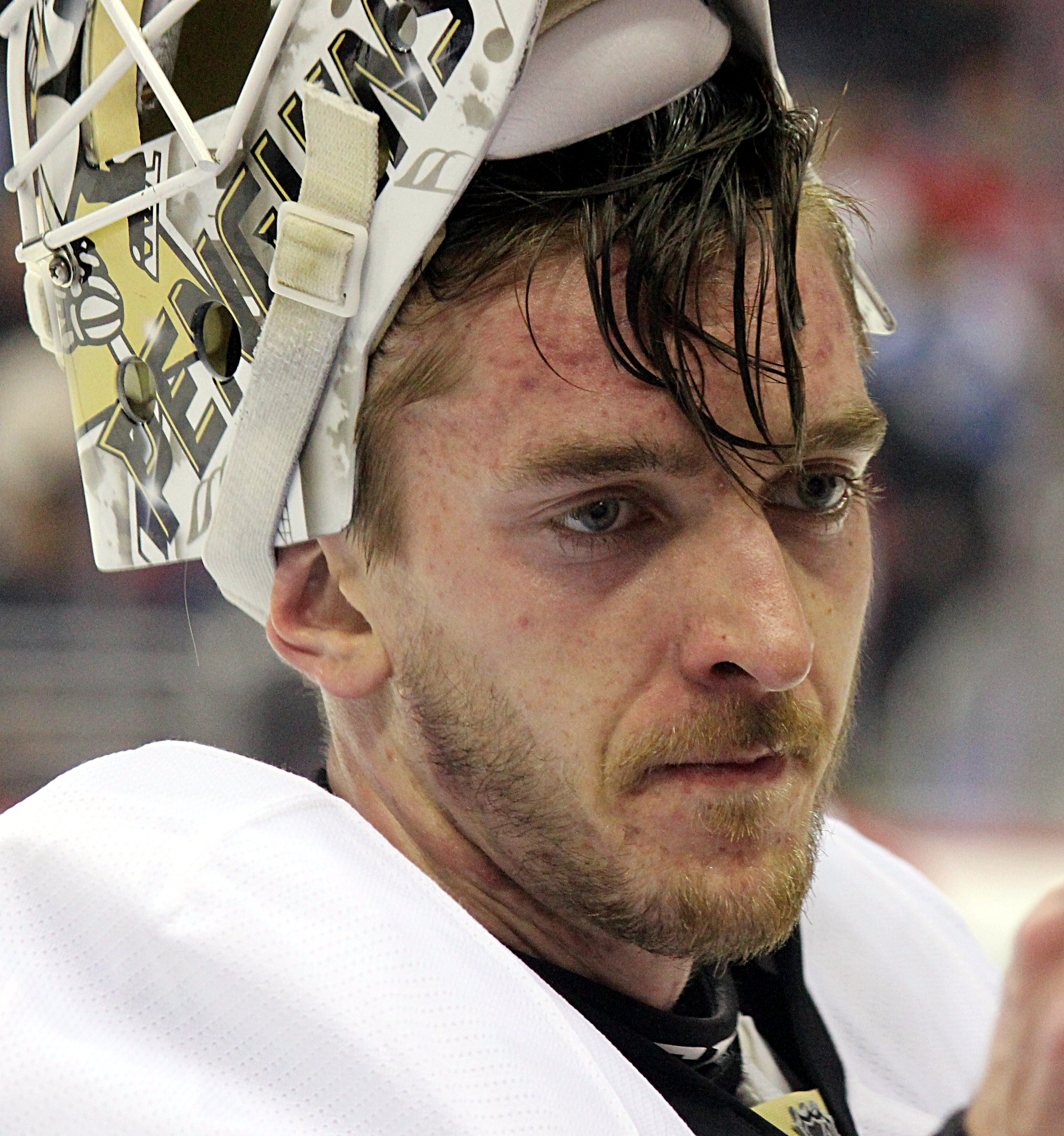
- Murray with the Pittsburgh Penguins in 2016
- Born: May 25, 1994 (age 32) Thunder Bay, Ontario, Canada
- Height: 6 ft 4 in (193 cm)
- Weight: 178 lb (81 kg; 12 st 10 lb)
- Position: Goaltender
- Catches: Left
- NHL team Former teams: Free agent Pittsburgh Penguins; Ottawa Senators; Toronto Maple Leafs; Seattle Kraken
- National team: Canada
- NHL draft: 83rd overall, 2012; Pittsburgh Penguins
- Playing career: 2014–present

Matthew Murray (born May 25, 1994) is a Canadian professional ice hockey player who is a goaltender and an unrestricted free agent. Murray was selected by the Pittsburgh Penguins in the third round (83rd overall) of the 2012 NHL entry draft. In 2016, Murray won his first Stanley Cup championship as the starting goaltender for the Penguins during the playoffs after having replaced then-starter Marc-André Fleury. Murray would split the net with Fleury during the 2017 Stanley Cup playoffs, winning the Stanley Cup again in 2017 and becoming the first goaltender to win back-to-back titles in his first two seasons in the NHL. He has also played for the Ottawa Senators and Toronto Maple Leafs. In recent years, his career has been plagued by injuries.

== Playing career ==
=== Early career ===
Murray was born and raised in Thunder Bay, Ontario and played his minor hockey with the Thunder Bay Minor Hockey Association. He spent his younger years playing AA before moving up to the Thunder Bay Kings AAA program.

In his minor midget season (2009–10), Murray led his Kings to a 3–2–0 record at the OHL Cup. That season with the Kings, Murray appeared in 40 games with a 2.28 GAA and six shutouts. He was subsequently selected in the second round (35th overall) of the 2010 OHL Priority Selection by the Sault Ste. Marie Greyhounds.

Murray played major junior hockey in the Ontario Hockey League with the Sault Ste. Marie Greyhounds. On September 4, 2013, Murray was signed to a three-year entry-level contract with the Pittsburgh Penguins.

=== Pittsburgh Penguins ===
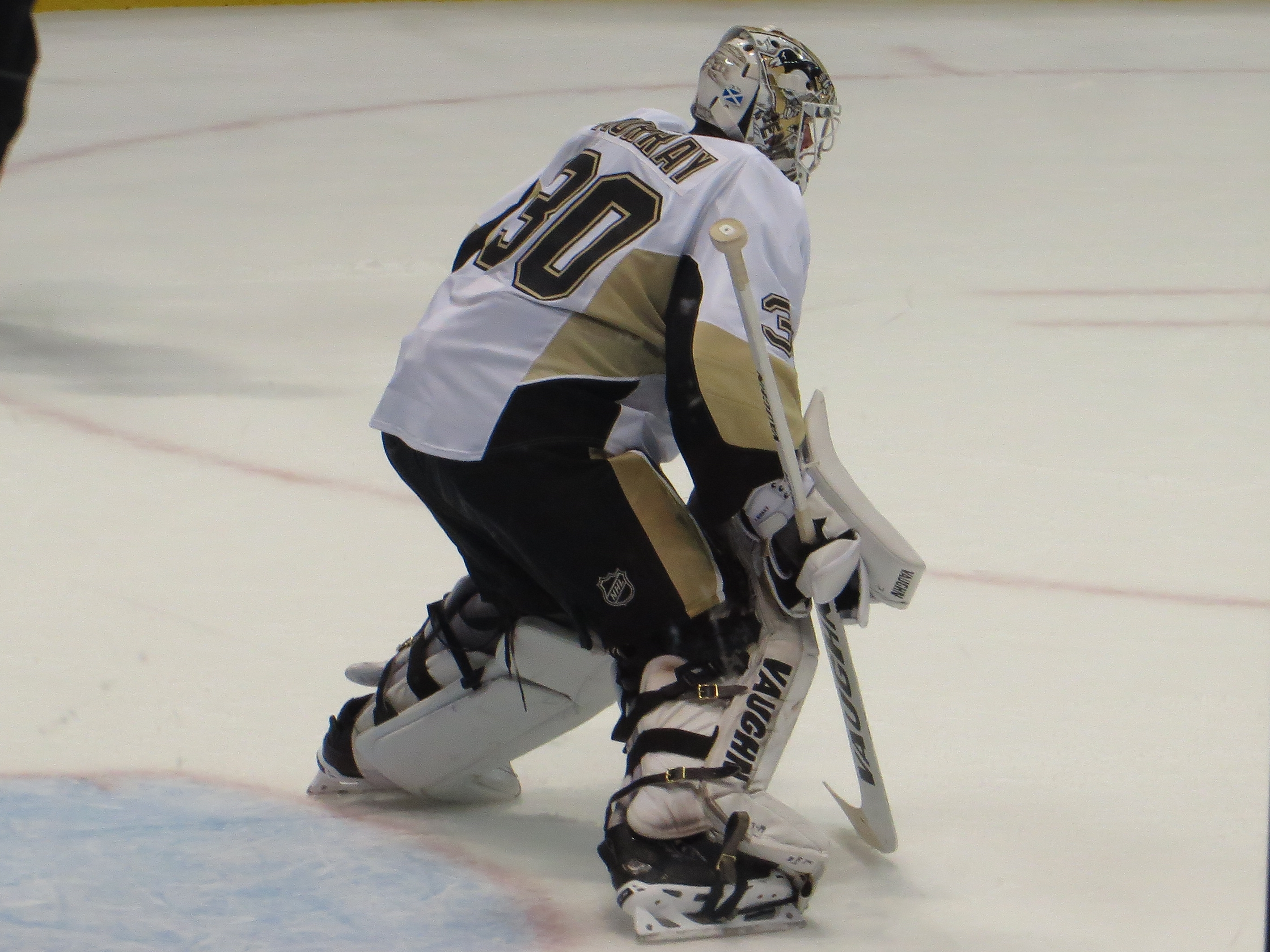
Murray in net for the Pittsburgh Penguins during a preseason game in September 2015.

During his first full professional season with the Penguins AHL affiliate, the Wilkes-Barre/Scranton Penguins in 2014–15, on March 8, 2015, Murray set an AHL record for the longest shutout streak by not allowing any goals for 304 minutes and 11 seconds. The previous record of 268:17 was held by Barry Brust.

On March 22, Murray recorded his tenth shutout of the season, breaking a record for rookie AHL goaltenders set by Gordie Bell in 1942–43. He would finish the regular season with 12 shutouts. Murray capped his standout rookie season by sweeping the AHL awards, he was selected to the AHL First All-Star Team and Rookie Team while winning the Baz Bastien Memorial Award as the League's best goaltender and the Dudley "Red" Garrett Memorial Award as best rookie.

In the 2015–16 season, Murray was recalled from the AHL for the first time to the Pittsburgh Penguins on December 15, 2015, and made his NHL debut on December 19, 2015 in a 2–1 loss against the Carolina Hurricanes. Murray was recalled again by the Pittsburgh Penguins on February 21, 2016, and started nine games to finish the season.

On April 19, 2016, the 21-year-old Murray made his NHL playoff debut in game three of the first round becoming the youngest goaltender in franchise history to start a post-season game. He allowed just one goal as the Penguins defeated the New York Rangers 3–1. Two days later, Murray recorded his first career playoff shutout in a 5–0 win over the Rangers.

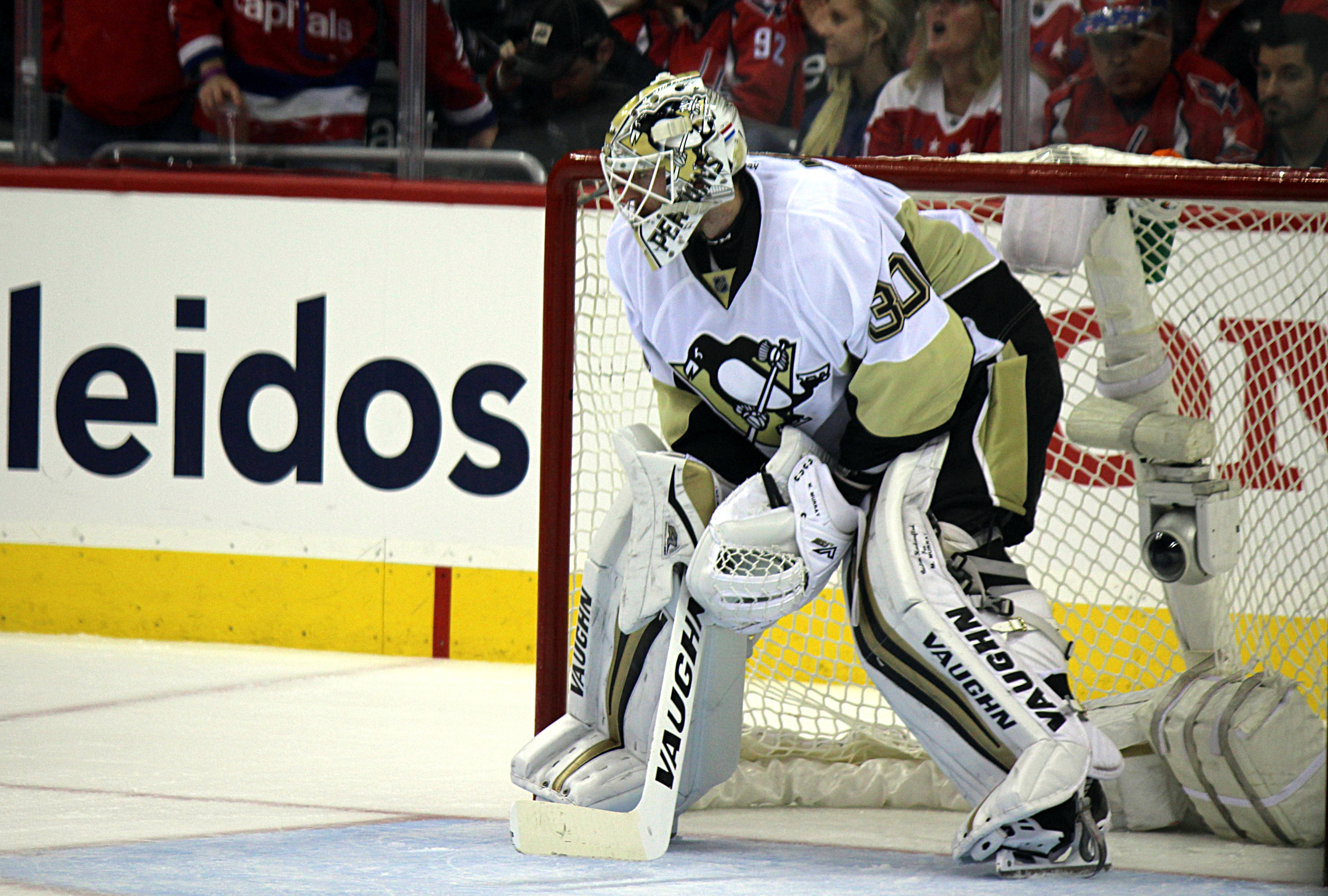
Murray in net for the Penguins for the first game of their second round series against the Capitals in 2016.

Murray remained the starter throughout the 2016 playoffs. After being replaced by veteran Marc-André Fleury, who returned from injury in game five of the third round, he started in all remainder games of the 2016 Stanley Cup playoffs. Murray led the Penguins past the San Jose Sharks in the finals to the franchise's fourth Stanley Cup. He posted an impressive .923 save percentage and 2.08 GAA throughout the playoffs and became only the sixth starting rookie goaltender in the Stanley Cup Final since 1976.

Murray was then re-signed by the Penguins to a three-year contract with an annual average salary of $3.75 million.

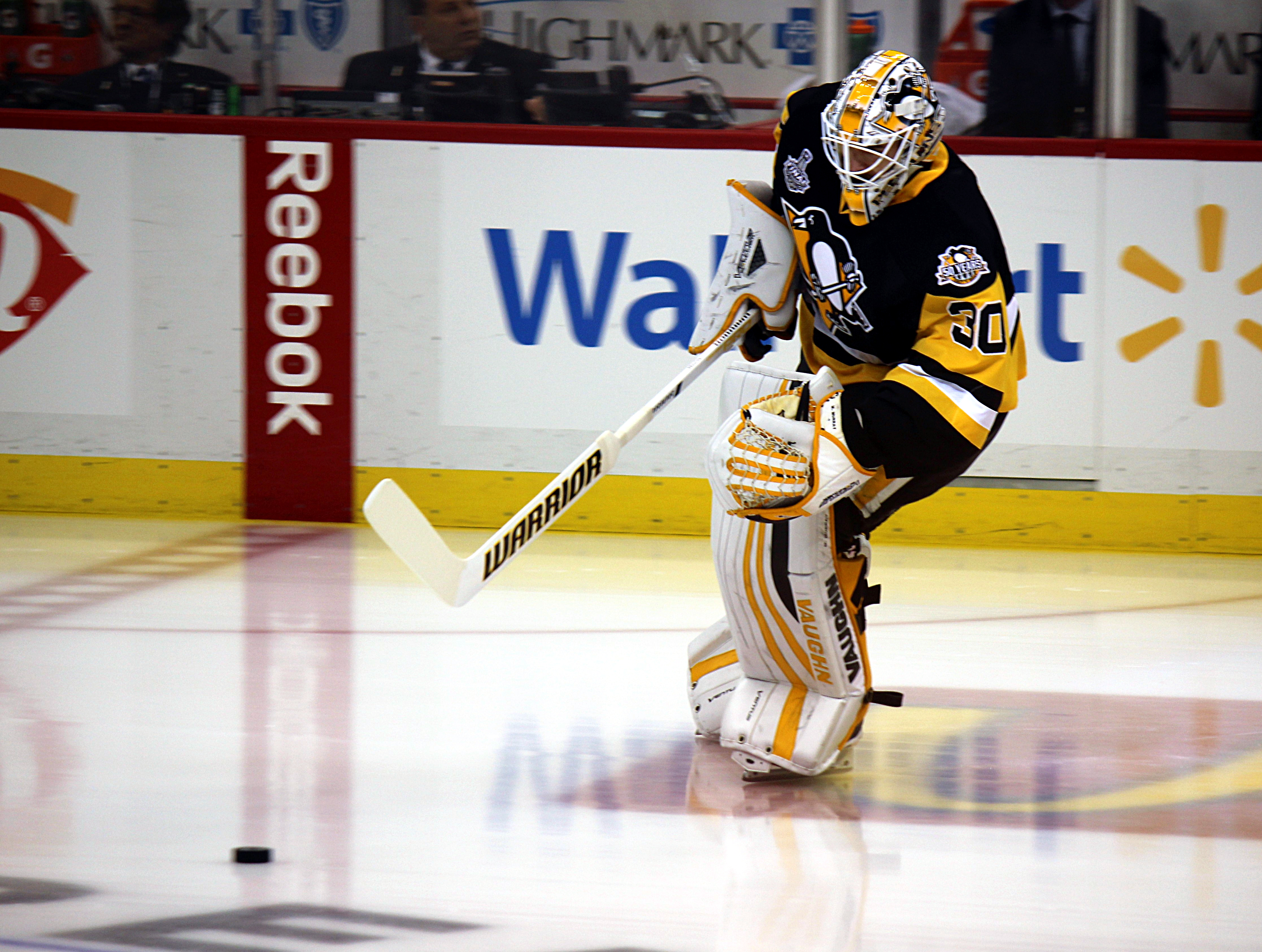
Murray with the Penguins during the 2017 Stanley Cup Final.

To start the 2016–17 season, Murray was injured due to a broken hand sustained during international play. Following his return, he supplanted the veteran Fleury as the Penguins starter and retained his elite form from his first year. During the season, he recorded 32 wins, a .923 save percentage, 2.41 GAA, and four shutouts. He finished within the top ten of the NHL amongst qualifying goaltenders in wins, save percentage, and shutouts, while finishing 11th in GAA. This elite play allowed Murray to finish fourth in Calder Trophy voting for Rookie of the Year and earned Murray a spot on the 2016–17 All-Rookie Team and the 2017 NHL All-Playoff Team.

He recorded his first NHL point on December 8, 2016, an assist on an empty net goal.

During warm-ups of game one of the Penguins' first-round matchup versus the Columbus Blue Jackets in the 2017 Stanley Cup playoffs, Murray was injured and Fleury replaced him. He saw his first action of the 2017 Stanley Cup playoffs in game three of the Eastern Conference Final against the Ottawa Senators after Fleury was pulled from the game. He recorded a shutout two games later, stopping all 25 shots he faced in a 7–0 win. A thrilling game seven overtime win helped Murray and the Penguins reach the Stanley Cup Final for the second year in a row. Despite two solid starts in the first two games against the Nashville Predators, Murray's game faltered in games three and four. As a result, there was much speculation about who would start in the fifth game. Murray was announced as the starter and stopped all 24 shots the Nashville Predators shot at him in a 6–0 win. Murray made 27 saves in game six, shutting out the Predators 2–0 and winning the Stanley Cup for the second consecutive season.

During the 2017–18 season Murray sustained his second concussion during practice. On February 26, 2018, during practice, Murray was struck in the head with a puck shot by teammate and defenseman Olli Määttä and was forced to leave the session early. Murray had previously sustained a concussion in the 2015–16 season causing him to miss the first two games of the playoffs. Matt Murray returned from his February 2018 concussion, as the Penguins' starting goaltender, on March 20, 2018, against the New York Islanders. Murray allowed four goals in the Penguins' 4–1 loss during that game.

Murray recorded the longest playoff shutout streak in Penguins franchise history at 225:49. It started during game four of the 2017 Stanley Cup Final and ended in game two of the Penguins' 2018 first-round series against the Philadelphia Flyers, when Shayne Gostisbehere scored late in the first period. On April 18, 2018, Murray became the fastest goaltender to record 25 playoff wins in the NHL. On April 23, 2018, Murray was nominated for the King Clancy Memorial Trophy as a player who best exemplifies leadership qualities and gives back to in his community. Despite Murray's efforts, Pittsburgh ended up losing to the Washington Capitals in six games in the second round of the playoffs.

Murray was the starting goaltender for the Penguins to begin the 2018–19 season. After starting two games, Murray was diagnosed with a concussion following practice on October 8 and was ruled out indefinitely. He returned to the lineup on October 13 as a backup to Casey DeSmith only to be placed on injured reserve again in November due to a lower-body injury.

Murray and the Penguins were swept by the New York Islanders in the first round of the 2019 Stanley Cup playoffs; Murray recorded a 3.01 goals against average for the series.

On October 12, 2019, Murray recorded his 100th NHL win, a 7–4 victory over the Minnesota Wild; he accomplished the feat in only 166 games, tying Pete Peeters for seventh fastest since the 1967 expansion.

=== Ottawa Senators ===
On October 7, 2020, as an impending restricted free agent, Murray was traded by the Penguins to the Ottawa Senators in exchange for Jonathan Gruden and a second-round pick in 2020. On October 9, Murray signed a four-year, $25 million contract extension with the Senators.

During his second year under contract, Murray opened the 2021–22 season by going winless in his opening six appearances. On November 28, 2021, Murray was placed on waivers and later demoted to regain his game with AHL affiliate, the Belleville Senators, the following day after going unclaimed. After two games in Belleville, managing a 1–1–0 record and a .918 save percentage, Murray was recalled to Ottawa to resume duties as the starter. His season came to an end on March 4, 2022, after a collision with Senators defenceman Nikita Zaitsev left him with a concussion. In his absence, Anton Forsberg began to establish himself as the team's preferred starting goaltender. The Senators opted to extend Forsberg after the end of the season, fueling speculation that they would look to trade Murray elsewhere. General manager Pierre Dorion first attempted a deal with the Buffalo Sabres, having arranged to send Murray and the seventh overall pick in the 2022 NHL entry draft to the Sabres in exchange for the sixteenth overall pick. However, the Sabres had been included on Murray's no-trade list as part of his contract, and he declined to waive it; Ottawa ultimately moved the pick tied to Murray to Chicago in a package deal for Alex DeBrincat.

=== Toronto Maple Leafs ===
Shortly after the vetoed trade to the Sabres, rumors began to publicly appear heavily connecting Murray to interest from the rival Toronto Maple Leafs. Ultimately the Senators announced on July 11, 2022, that they had traded Murray to the Maple Leafs, along with a third-round pick in 2023 and a seventh-round pick in 2024, in exchange for future considerations. The Senators also retained 25% of Murray's salary for the remainder of the contract. Leafs general manager Kyle Dubas and coach Sheldon Keefe had both known Murray during his time in the OHL with the Greyhounds and with Leafs starting goaltender Jack Campbell expected to depart in free agency, they settled on Murray as a replacement.

Murray played the Maple Leafs' season-opening game, a 4–3 loss to the Montreal Canadiens on October 12, 2022, but on October 15 he departed the team's morning skate with groin pain. It was subsequently announced that he had suffered an adductor injury and would miss at least four weeks of the regular season. He picked up his first Maple Leafs win on November 15, 2022, a 5–2 win against his former team, the Pittsburgh Penguins and his first Maple Leafs shutout on December 6 against the Dallas Stars. His season was injury plagued, suffering three major injuries that kept him out of the lineup for significant time, including a concussion on April 2 in a game versus the Detroit Red Wings which caused him to miss the rest of the season.

On October 9, 2023, it was announced that Murray had undergone bilateral hip surgery, causing him to miss six to eight months. He returned in April for a conditioning stint with Toronto's AHL affiliate, the Toronto Marlies. Despite not playing a game for the Maple Leafs during the 2023–24 season, Murray signed a one-year extension with the club on July 2, 2024. He was placed on waivers and after going unclaimed, assigned to the Marlies for the 2024–25 season.

After beginning the 2024–25 season with the Marlies, Murray was recalled to the Maple Leafs on December 20, 2024, following an injury to Anthony Stolarz. The same day, he made his first NHL start since April 2, 2023, stopping 24 of 27 shots in a 6–3 victory over the Buffalo Sabres.

=== Seattle Kraken ===
Murray signed with the Seattle Kraken as a free agent on July 1, 2025 with a one-year, $1 million deal for the 2025–26 season. He played five games with the Kraken, where he went 0-2-1 with a 2.21 GAA and a 0.922 save percentage. He was placed on injured reserve November 18, 2025, and was reactivated March 10, 2026. He became an unrestricted free agent at the end of the season.

== International play ==
Medal record

Ice hockey

Representing Canada

World Championships
Silver medal – second place	2019 Slovakia	

World U18 Championships
Bronze medal – third place	2012 Czech Republic	

Murray represented Team North America at the 2016 World Cup of Hockey, as starting goaltender. On September 19, he broke his hand playing against Russia but went undiagnosed for several days before getting an MRI and confirmed with a broken ligament.

On April 29, 2019, Murray was named as the first choice goaltender to backstop Canada at the 2019 IIHF World Championship held in Slovakia. Recording five wins in seven games, Murray helped Canada progress through to the playoff rounds before losing the final to Finland to finish with the silver medal on May 26, 2019.

== Personal life ==
Murray's father, who died in January 2018, was from Scotland and his mother is from the Netherlands. He married his high school sweetheart Christina Sirignano on June 20, 2019.

== Career statistics ==
=== Regular season and playoffs ===
Bold indicates led league

			Regular season									Playoffs
Season	Team	League	GP	W	L	T/OT	MIN	GA	SO	GAA	SV%	GP	W	L	MIN	GA	SO	GAA	SV%
2009–10	Thunder Bay Kings Min. Midget	HNO	40	—	—	—	1975	75	6	2.28	0	—	—	—	—	—	—	—	—
2010–11	Sault Ste. Marie Greyhounds	OHL	28	8	11	3	1377	87	1	3.79	.887	—	—	—	—	—	—	—	—
2011–12	Sault Ste. Marie Greyhounds	OHL	36	13	19	1	1912	130	0	4.08	.876	—	—	—	—	—	—	—	—
2012–13	Sault Ste. Marie Greyhounds	OHL	53	26	19	4	2910	178	1	3.67	.894	6	2	4	381	17	1	2.67	.910
2013–14	Sault Ste. Marie Greyhounds	OHL	49	32	11	6	2984	128	6	2.57	.921	9	4	5	547	24	1	2.63	.915
2013–14	Wilkes-Barre/Scranton Penguins	AHL	1	0	1	0	60	2	0	2.00	.920	1	0	0	20	0	0	0.00	1.000
2014–15	Wilkes-Barre/Scranton Penguins	AHL	40	25	10	3	2321	61	12	1.58	.941	8	4	4	456	18	1	2.37	.923
2015–16	Pittsburgh Penguins	NHL	13	9	2	1	749	25	1	2.00	.930	21	**15**	6	1268	44	1	2.08	.923
2016–17	Pittsburgh Penguins	NHL	49	32	10	4	2766	111	4	2.41	.923	11	7	3	669	19	**3**	1.70	**.937**
2017–18	Pittsburgh Penguins	NHL	49	27	16	3	2733	133	1	2.92	.907	12	6	6	716	29	2	2.43	.908
2018–19	Pittsburgh Penguins	NHL	50	29	14	6	2880	129	4	2.69	.919	4	0	4	239	12	0	3.01	.906
2019–20	Pittsburgh Penguins	NHL	38	20	11	5	2238	107	1	2.87	.899	3	1	2	192	8	0	2.50	.914
2020–21	Ottawa Senators	NHL	27	10	13	1	1405	79	2	3.38	.893	—	—	—	—	—	—	—	—
2021–22	Ottawa Senators	NHL	20	5	12	2	1182	60	1	3.05	.906	—	—	—	—	—	—	—	—
2021–22	Belleville Senators	AHL	2	1	1	0	118	5	0	2.55	.918	—	—	—	—	—	—	—	—
2022–23	Toronto Maple Leafs	NHL	26	14	8	2	1474	74	1	3.01	.903	—	—	—	—	—	—	—	—
2023–24	Toronto Marlies	AHL	3	1	2	0	179	12	0	4.03	.846	—	—	—	—	—	—	—	—
2024–25	Toronto Marlies	AHL	21	10	5	4	1,150	33	3	1.72	.934	1	0	1	99	4	0	2.42	.920
2024–25	Toronto Maple Leafs	NHL	2	1	1	0	119	7	0	3.54	.879	1	0	0	14	1	0	4.41	.857
2025–26	Seattle Kraken	NHL	5	0	2	1	217	8	0	2.21	.922	—	—	—	—	—	—	—	—
NHL totals			279	147	89	25	15,759	733	15	2.79	.910	52	29	21	3,096	113	6	2.19	.920

=== International ===
Year	Team	Event	Result	GP	W	L	T	MIN	GA	SO	GAA	SV%
2012	Canada	U18	3rd place, bronze medalist(s)	7	4	3	0	421	19	0	2.72	.920
2016	Team North America	WCH	5th	2	1	1	0	95	5	0	3.16	.866
2019	Canada	WC	2nd place, silver medalist(s)	7	5	2	0	418	14	1	2.01	.926
Junior totals				7	4	3	0	421	19	0	2.72	.920
Senior totals				9	6	3	0	513	19	1	2.22	.918

== Awards and honours ==
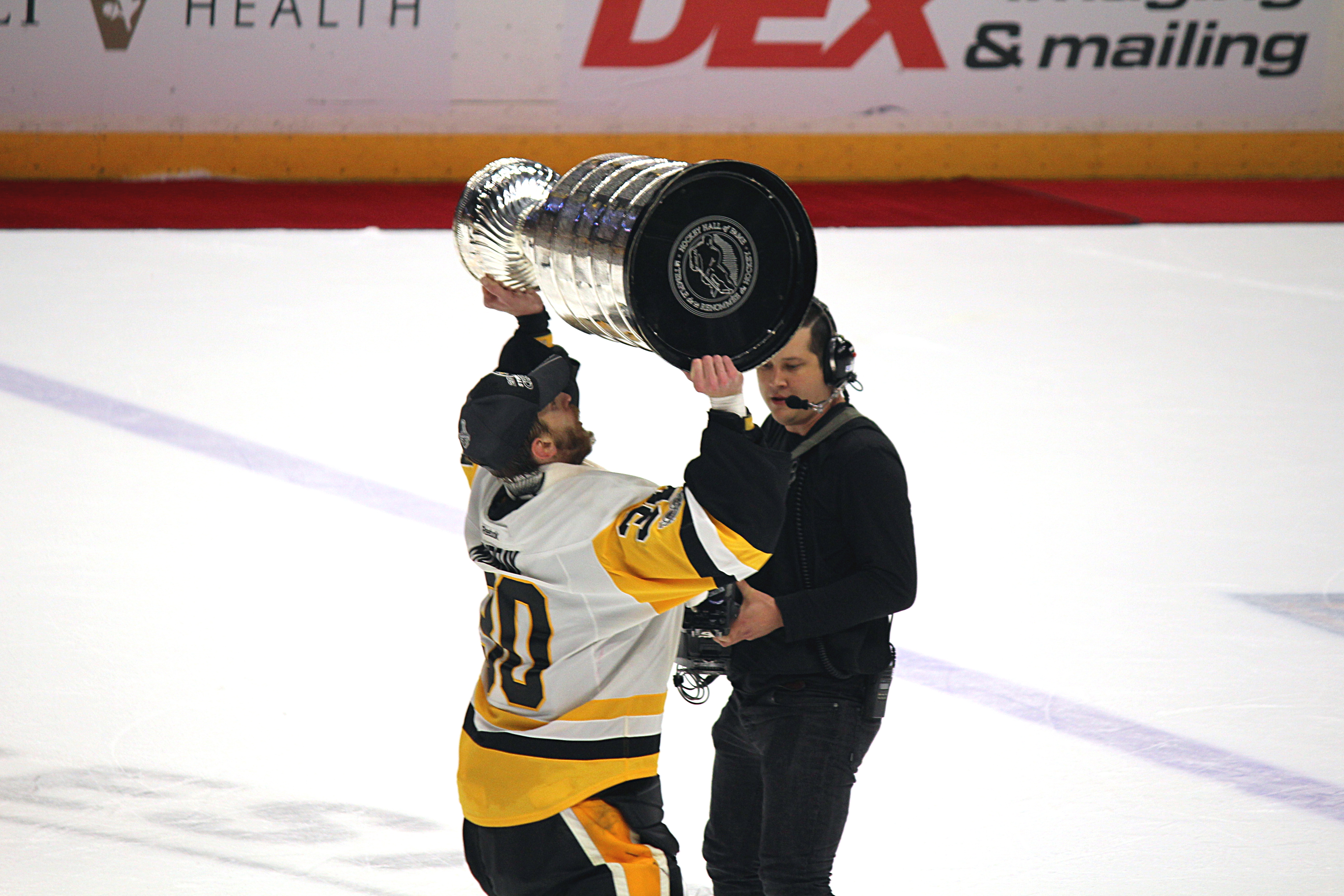
Murray hoists the Stanley Cup after the 2017 Stanley Cup Final.

Award	Year
OHL
Second All-Star Team	2014
AHL
All-Rookie Team	2015
Harry "Hap" Holmes Memorial Award	2015
Dudley "Red" Garrett Memorial Award	2015
Aldege "Baz" Bastien Memorial Award	2015
First All-Star Team	2015
NHL
Stanley Cup champion	2016, 2017
NHL All-Rookie Team	2017
Pittsburgh Penguins
Michel Brière Rookie of the Year Award	2016
Aldege "Baz" Bastien Memorial Good Guy Award	2018

Awards
Preceded by Curtis McKenzie	Dudley "Red" Garrett Memorial Award; 2014–15	Succeeded by Mikko Rantanen/Frank Vatrano
Preceded by Jeff Deslauriers; Eric Hartzell	Harry "Hap" Holmes Memorial Award; 2014–15; With: Jeff Zatkoff	Succeeded by Peter Budaj
Preceded by Jake Allen	Aldege "Baz" Bastien Memorial Award; 2014–15	Succeeded by Peter Budaj
