= 2018 Stanley Cup playoffs =

Playoff tournament of the NHL

Tournament details
- Dates: April 11–June 7, 2018
- Teams: 16
- Defending champions: Pittsburgh Penguins

Final positions
- Champions: Washington Capitals
- Runners-up: Vegas Golden Knights

Tournament statistics
- Scoring leader(s): Evgeny Kuznetsov (Capitals) (32 points)

Awards
- MVP: Alexander Ovechkin (Capitals)

The 2018 Stanley Cup playoffs was the playoff tournament of the National Hockey League (NHL) for the 2017–18 season. The playoffs began on April 11, 2018, after the regular season, and they concluded on June 7, 2018, with the Washington Capitals winning their first Stanley Cup in franchise history by defeating the Vegas Golden Knights four games to one in the Stanley Cup Final.

The Nashville Predators made the playoffs as the Presidents' Trophy winners with the most points (i.e. best record) during the regular season. The Pittsburgh Penguins increased their post-season appearance streak to twelve seasons, the current longest streak.

The Vegas Golden Knights became the first team to make the playoffs in their inaugural season in the league since the 1979–80 Hartford Whalers and the Edmonton Oilers. They also became the first expansion team to make the playoffs in their inaugural season since the 1967 NHL expansion. From there, they eventually became the first team since the 1967–68 St. Louis Blues to reach the Stanley Cup Final in their inaugural season. The only difference is that the 1967–68 season through to the 1969–70 season ensured that an expansion team would be able to reach the Stanley Cup Final. For the fourth time in league history (2000, 2001, 2007), only two Original Six teams, the Boston Bruins and Toronto Maple Leafs, clinched a berth for the playoffs. For the first time since 1966, no playoff games were played in the state of New York. For the fifth time in eight years, all three California-based teams made the playoffs. For the first time in league history, the Montreal Canadiens and the Detroit Red Wings missed the playoffs in the same year. For the first time since 1969, both the Chicago Blackhawks and the Detroit Red Wings missed the playoffs in the same season. For the first time since 2009 and the only time in the 2010s, no California-based team reached the conference finals.

The playoffs featured ten overtime games, the fewest since 2000. This was also the first time since 1997 that no games played in either the Conference finals or Stanley Cup Final went to overtime.

== Playoff seeds ==
This was the fifth year in which the top three teams in each division made the playoffs, along with two wild cards in each conference (for a total of eight playoff teams from each conference).

The following teams qualified for the playoffs:

=== Eastern Conference ===
==== Atlantic Division ====
1. Tampa Bay Lightning, Atlantic Division champions, Eastern Conference regular season champions – 113 points
2. Boston Bruins – 112 points
3. Toronto Maple Leafs – 105 points

==== Metropolitan Division ====
1. Washington Capitals, Metropolitan Division champions – 105 points
2. Pittsburgh Penguins – 100 points
3. Philadelphia Flyers – 98 points

==== Wild cards ====
1. Columbus Blue Jackets – 97 points (39 ROWs, 6 points head-to-head vs. New Jersey)
2. New Jersey Devils – 97 points (39 ROWs, 2 points head-to-head vs. Columbus)

=== Western Conference ===
==== Central Division ====
1. Nashville Predators, Central Division champions, Western Conference regular season champions, Presidents' Trophy winners – 117 points
2. Winnipeg Jets – 114 points
3. Minnesota Wild – 101 points

==== Pacific Division ====
1. Vegas Golden Knights, Pacific Division champions – 109 points
2. Anaheim Ducks – 101 points
3. San Jose Sharks – 100 points

==== Wild cards ====
1. Los Angeles Kings – 98 points
2. Colorado Avalanche – 95 points

== Playoff bracket ==
In each round, teams competed in a best-of-seven series following a 2–2–1–1–1 format (scores in the bracket indicate the number of games won in each best-of-seven series). The team with home ice advantage played at home for games one and two (and games five and seven, if necessary), and the other team was at home for games three and four (and game six, if necessary). The top three teams in each division made the playoffs, along with two wild cards in each conference, for a total of eight teams from each conference.

In the first round, the lower seeded wild card in the conference played against the division winner with the best record while the other wild card played against the other division winner, and both wild cards were de facto #4 seeds. The other series matched the second and third place teams from the divisions. In the first two rounds, home ice advantage was awarded to the team with the better seed. Thereafter, it was awarded to the team that had the better regular season record.

First round	Second round
A1	Tampa Bay	4
WC2	New Jersey	1
A1	Tampa Bay	4
A2	Boston	1
A2	Boston	4
A3	Toronto	3
Eastern Conference
M1	Washington	4
WC1	Columbus	2
M1	Washington	4
M2	Pittsburgh	2
M2	Pittsburgh	4
M3	Philadelphia	2
C1	Nashville	4
WC2	Colorado	2
C1	Nashville	3
C2	Winnipeg	4
C2	Winnipeg	4
C3	Minnesota	1
Western Conference
P1	Vegas	4
WC1	Los Angeles	0
P1	Vegas	4
P3	San Jose	2
P2	Anaheim	0
P3	San Jose	4

Conference finals
A1	Tampa Bay	3
M1	Washington	4
C2	Winnipeg	1
P1	Vegas	4

Stanley Cup Final
M1	Washington	4
P1	Vegas	1

Legend

- A1, A2, A3 – The first, second, and third place teams from the Atlantic Division, respectively
- M1, M2, M3 – The first, second, and third place teams from the Metropolitan Division, respectively
- C1, C2, C3 – The first, second, and third place teams from the Central Division, respectively
- P1, P2, P3 – The first, second, and third place teams from the Pacific Division, respectively
- WC1, WC2 – The first and second place teams in the Wild Card, respectively

== First round ==
=== Eastern Conference first round ===
==== (A1) Tampa Bay Lightning vs. (WC2) New Jersey Devils ====
The Tampa Bay Lightning finished first in the Atlantic Division earning 113 points. New Jersey finished as the Eastern Conference's second wild card, earning 97 points. This was the third playoff meeting between these teams with New Jersey winning both previous series. They last met in the 2007 Eastern Conference quarterfinals, which New Jersey won in six games. New Jersey won all three games in this year's regular season series.

The Lightning defeated the Devils in five games. Although Taylor Hall scored his first playoff goal in game one, the Devils were beaten 5–2 as Ondrej Palat recorded three points for Tampa Bay. In game two, a four-goal barrage by the Lightning during the second period forced Devils goaltender Keith Kinkaid to be pulled. Tampa won the game 5–3. The Devils recovered in game three as Taylor Hall scored a goal and two assists in a 5–2 victory. J. T. Miller and Nikita Kucherov both had three points in a 3–1 victory for the Lightning in game four. In game five, Kucherov's goal was the series-winner as the Lightning held off a late attack by the Devils to win 3–1.

April 12	New Jersey Devils	2–5	Tampa Bay Lightning	Amalie Arena	Recap
No scoring		First period	15:00 – Ondrej Palat (1); 19:31 – Tyler Johnson (1)
Taylor Hall (1) – 13:55		Second period	01:54 – pp – Yanni Gourde (1)
Travis Zajac (1) – pp – 09:35		Third period	12:14 – Alex Killorn (1); 18:48 – en – Nikita Kucherov (1)
Keith Kinkaid 27 saves / 31 shots		Goalie stats	Andrei Vasilevskiy 29 saves / 31 shots

April 14	New Jersey Devils	3–5	Tampa Bay Lightning	Amalie Arena	Recap
Nico Hischier (1) – 13:38		First period	12:15 – Brayden Point (1)
Sami Vatanen (1) – 19:34		Second period	03:14 – pp – Alex Killorn (2); 04:36 – Tyler Johnson (2); 06:01 – Nikita Kucherov (2); 13:12 – pp – Alex Killorn (3)
Blake Coleman (1) – 11:57		Third period	No scoring
Keith Kinkaid 10 saves / 15 shots Cory Schneider 10 saves / 10 shots		Goalie stats	Andrei Vasilevskiy 41 saves / 44 shots

April 16	Tampa Bay Lightning	2–5	New Jersey Devils	Prudential Center	Recap
No scoring		First period	No scoring
Alex Killorn (4) – pp – 00:42		Second period	12:24 – Taylor Hall (2)
Steven Stamkos (1) – pp – 00:38		Third period	04:03 – pp – Will Butcher (1); 12:55 – Stefan Noesen (1); 19:02 – sh-en – Blake Coleman (2); 19:22 – en – Ben Lovejoy (1)
Andrei Vasilevskiy 36 saves / 39 shots		Goalie stats	Cory Schneider 34 saves / 36 shots

April 18	Tampa Bay Lightning	3–1	New Jersey Devils	Prudential Center	Recap
J. T. Miller (1) – 11:30; Nikita Kucherov (3) – 15:02		First period	08:23 – pp – Kyle Palmieri (1)
No scoring		Second period	No scoring
Nikita Kucherov (4) – en – 18:52		Third period	No scoring
Andrei Vasilevskiy 27 saves / 28 shots		Goalie stats	Cory Schneider 34 saves / 36 shots

April 21	New Jersey Devils	1–3	Tampa Bay Lightning	Amalie Arena	Recap
No scoring		First period	08:07 – Mikhail Sergachev (1)
No scoring		Second period	No scoring
Patrick Maroon (1) – 17:00		Third period	12:27 – Nikita Kucherov (5); 19:58 – en – Ryan Callahan (1)
Cory Schneider 35 saves / 37 shots		Goalie stats	Andrei Vasilevskiy 26 saves / 27 shots

Tampa Bay won series 4–1

==== (A2) Boston Bruins vs. (A3) Toronto Maple Leafs ====
The Boston Bruins finished second in the Atlantic Division earning 112 points. The Toronto Maple Leafs earned 105 points to finish third in the Atlantic Division. This was the fifteenth playoff meeting between these two teams with Toronto winning eight of the fourteen previous series. They last met in the 2013 Eastern Conference quarterfinals, which Boston won in seven games. Toronto won three of the four games in this year's regular season series.

The Bruins defeated the Maple Leafs in seven games. Tuukka Rask made 26 saves for the Bruins in game one, winning the game 5–1. During the game, Maple Leafs forward Nazem Kadri was given a five-minute major for a charging penalty for his hit on Tommy Wingels; he would later be suspended for three games. David Pastrnak had a hat trick and three assists in a 7–3 victory for the Bruins in game two, becoming the first player since Claude Giroux in 2012 to score a hat trick and three assists. In game three, Patrick Marleau scored twice for the Maple Leafs in a 4–2 victory. Pastrnak assisted twice on two goals in a 3–1 triumph for the Bruins, taking a 3–1 series lead in the process. In game five, Toronto prevented a come-back by Boston, fending off the Bruins 4–3 as Frederik Andersen made 42 saves for the Maple Leafs. Nikita Zaitsev assisted twice in a 3–1 Maple Leafs victory, forcing a seventh game in the series. In game seven, Bruins forward Patrice Bergeron scored a goal and recorded two assists in a 7–4 victory to advance his team to the second round.

April 12	Toronto Maple Leafs	1–5	Boston Bruins	TD Garden	Recap
Zach Hyman (1) – 16:52		First period	05:28 – pp – Brad Marchand (1)
No scoring		Second period	15:43 – pp – David Backes (1); 19:22 – David Pastrnak (1)
No scoring		Third period	07:41 – Sean Kuraly (1); 11:29 – pp – David Krejci (1)
Frederik Andersen 35 saves / 40 shots		Goalie stats	Tuukka Rask 26 saves / 27 shots

April 14	Toronto Maple Leafs	3–7	Boston Bruins	TD Garden	Recap
No scoring		First period	05:26 – David Pastrnak (2); 09:46 – pp – Jake DeBrusk (1); 12:13 – Kevan Miller (1); 15:00 – pp – Rick Nash (1)
Mitch Marner (1) – 01:22; Tyler Bozak (1) – 09:02		Second period	03:46 – David Krejci (2)
James van Riemsdyk (1) – pp – 14:53		Third period	12:34 – David Pastrnak (3); 18:24 – David Pastrnak (4)
Frederik Andersen 2 saves / 5 shots Curtis McElhinney 19 saves / 23 shots		Goalie stats	Tuukka Rask 30 saves / 33 shots

April 16	Boston Bruins	2–4	Toronto Maple Leafs	Air Canada Centre	Recap
No scoring		First period	17:05 – pp – James van Riemsdyk (2)
Adam McQuaid (1) – 03:06; Zdeno Chara (1) – 06:19		Second period	03:49 – Patrick Marleau (1); 14:47 – Auston Matthews (1)
No scoring		Third period	16:25 – Patrick Marleau (2)
Tuukka Rask 26 saves / 30 shots		Goalie stats	Frederik Andersen 40 saves / 42 shots

April 19	Boston Bruins	3–1	Toronto Maple Leafs	Air Canada Centre	Recap
Torey Krug (1) – 00:28		First period	07:43 – Tomas Plekanec (1)
Brad Marchand (2) – 16:55		Second period	No scoring
Jake DeBrusk (2) – 04:17		Third period	No scoring
Tuukka Rask 31 saves / 32 shots		Goalie stats	Frederik Andersen 18 saves / 21 shots

April 21	Toronto Maple Leafs	4–3	Boston Bruins	TD Garden	Recap
Connor Brown (1) – 06:36; Andreas Johnsson (1) – 10:12		First period	No scoring
Tyler Bozak (2) – 10:36; James van Riemsdyk (3) – pp – 11:55		Second period	09:45 – pp – David Backes (2); 17:18 – Sean Kuraly (2)
No scoring		Third period	05:56 – Noel Acciari (1)
Frederik Andersen 42 saves / 45 shots		Goalie stats	Tuukka Rask 9 saves / 13 shots Anton Khudobin 8 saves / 8 shots

April 23	Boston Bruins	1–3	Toronto Maple Leafs	Air Canada Centre	Recap
No scoring		First period	No scoring
Jake DeBrusk (3) – 01:02		Second period	01:37 – William Nylander (1); 13:25 – Mitch Marner (2)
No scoring		Third period	18:46 – en – Tomas Plekanec (2)
Tuukka Rask 27 saves / 29 shots		Goalie stats	Frederik Andersen 32 saves / 33 shots

April 25	Toronto Maple Leafs	4–7	Boston Bruins	TD Garden	Recap
Patrick Marleau (3) – pp – 02:01; Patrick Marleau (4) – 06:12		First period	04:47 – pp – Jake DeBrusk (4); 09:10 – Danton Heinen (1); 19:23 – Patrice Bergeron (1)
Travis Dermott (1) – 02:07; Kasperi Kapanen (1) – sh – 06:05		Second period	No scoring
No scoring		Third period	01:10 – Torey Krug (2); 05:25 – Jake DeBrusk (5); 11:39 – David Pastrnak (5); 19:09 – en – Brad Marchand (3)
Frederik Andersen 29 saves / 35 shots		Goalie stats	Tuukka Rask 20 saves / 24 shots

Boston won series 4–3

==== (M1) Washington Capitals vs. (WC1) Columbus Blue Jackets ====
The Washington Capitals finished first in the Metropolitan Division earning 105 points. The Columbus Blue Jackets finished as the Eastern Conference's first wild card earning 97 points. This was the first playoff meeting between these two teams. Washington won three of the four games in this year's regular season series.

The Capitals came back from a 2–0 series deficit to defeat the Blue Jackets in six games. Columbus came back from a two-goal deficit in game one to force overtime, during which Artemi Panarin scored 6:02 into the extra session to give the Blue Jackets their first lead in a playoff series. The Blue Jackets overcame another two-goal deficit in game two, taking the game into overtime yet again. Matt Calvert scored the game-winning goal for Columbus as they took a 2–0 series lead. The Capitals took game three 3–2 in double-overtime as Lars Eller scored the game winner. The Capitals tied the series after game four as Washington's Alexander Ovechkin had a goal and an assist in a 4–1 victory. Nicklas Backstrom's tip-in was the overtime-winner for the Capitals in game five as they prevented a two-goal comeback by the Blue Jackets. In game six, Capitals captain Alexander Ovechkin scored twice to seal the series for Washington, winning the affair 6–3. With playoff series victories by Winnipeg and Vegas this season, Columbus became the last active NHL franchise without a playoff series win until they defeated the Tampa Bay Lightning in 2019.

April 12	Columbus Blue Jackets	4–3	OT	Washington Capitals	Capital One Arena	Recap
No scoring		First period		17:52 – pp – Evgeny Kuznetsov (1); 18:21 – pp – Evgeny Kuznetsov (2)
Alexander Wennberg (1) – 04:48		Second period		No scoring
Thomas Vanek (1) – pp – 01:31; Seth Jones (1) – pp – 15:34		Third period		05:12 – Devante Smith-Pelly (1)
Artemi Panarin (1) – 06:02		First overtime period		No scoring
Sergei Bobrovsky 27 saves / 30 shots		Goalie stats		Philipp Grubauer 23 saves / 27 shots

April 15	Columbus Blue Jackets	5–4	OT	Washington Capitals	Capital One Arena	Recap
Cam Atkinson (1) – 18:25		First period		02:12 – Jay Beagle (1); 13:26 – pp – Alexander Ovechkin (1)
Josh Anderson (1) – 08:49; Cam Atkinson (2) – pp – 11:13; Zach Werenski (1) – pp – 18:52		Second period		04:09 – pp – Alexander Ovechkin (2)
No scoring		Third period		16:25 – pp – T. J. Oshie (1)
Matt Calvert (1) – 12:22		First overtime period		No scoring
Sergei Bobrovsky 54 saves / 58 shots		Goalie stats		Philipp Grubauer 18 saves / 22 shots Braden Holtby 7 saves / 8 shots

April 17	Washington Capitals	3–2	2OT	Columbus Blue Jackets	Nationwide Arena	Recap
No scoring		First period		No scoring
Tom Wilson (1) – 05:52; John Carlson (1) – pp – 14:43		Second period		11:18 – Pierre-Luc Dubois (1)
No scoring		Third period		04:12 – Artemi Panarin (2)
Lars Eller (1) – 09:00		Second overtime period		No scoring
Braden Holtby 33 saves / 35 shots		Goalie stats		Sergei Bobrovsky 42 saves / 45 shots

April 19	Washington Capitals	4–1	Columbus Blue Jackets	Nationwide Arena	Recap
Tom Wilson (2) – 06:16		First period	No scoring
T. J. Oshie (2) – pp – 09:19		Second period	No scoring
Alexander Ovechkin (3) – 02:49; Evgeny Kuznetsov (3) – en – 17:41		Third period	06:22 – Boone Jenner (1)
Braden Holtby 23 saves / 24 shots		Goalie stats	Sergei Bobrovsky 29 saves / 32 shots

April 21	Columbus Blue Jackets	3–4	OT	Washington Capitals	Capital One Arena	Recap
Matt Calvert (2) – sh – 10:08		First period		13:22 – Nicklas Backstrom (1)
Matt Calvert (3) – 04:45		Second period		03:21 – Evgeny Kuznetsov (4); 16:42 – pp – T. J. Oshie (3)
Oliver Bjorkstrand (1) – 02:30		Third period		No scoring
No scoring		First overtime period		11:53 – Nicklas Backstrom (2)
Sergei Bobrovsky 25 saves / 29 shots		Goalie stats		Braden Holtby 39 saves / 42 shots

April 23	Washington Capitals	6–3	Columbus Blue Jackets	Nationwide Arena	Recap
Dmitry Orlov (1) – 12:12		First period	No scoring
Alexander Ovechkin (4) – 12:50; Alexander Ovechkin (5) – pp – 18:23		Second period	08:40 – Nick Foligno (1)
Devante Smith-Pelly (2) – 03:56; Chandler Stephenson (1) – sh – 05:30; Lars Eller (2) – en – 19:46		Third period	02:25 – Pierre-Luc Dubois (2); 08:22 – Nick Foligno (2)
Braden Holtby 35 saves / 38 shots		Goalie stats	Sergei Bobrovsky 22 saves / 27 shots

Washington won series 4–2

==== (M2) Pittsburgh Penguins vs. (M3) Philadelphia Flyers ====
The Pittsburgh Penguins finished second in the Metropolitan Division earning 100 points. The Philadelphia Flyers earned 98 points to finish third in the Metropolitan. This was the seventh playoff meeting between these two rivals with Philadelphia winning four of the six previous series. They last met in the 2012 Eastern Conference quarterfinals, which Philadelphia won in six games. Pittsburgh won all four games in this year's regular season series.

The Penguins defeated the Flyers in six games. In game one, Sidney Crosby capped off a hat trick to end a 7–0 rout over the Flyers. The Flyers defeated the Penguins in game two, riding on Sean Couturier's goal and two assists in a 5–1 victory. Pittsburgh took game three 5–1 as Crosby recorded a goal and three assists. Matt Murray recorded his second shutout of the series in game four, stopping all 26 shots he faced in a 5–0 victory for Pittsburgh. Prior to game five, Flyers captain Claude Giroux guaranteed his team a victory. Giroux scored the first goal of the game, and Couturier scored game-winning goal with 1:15 left in regulation time to force a sixth game in a 4–2 victory for Philadelphia. In game six, Sean Couturier recorded a hat trick for the Flyers whilst on a torn MCL. However, Jake Guentzel's natural hat trick, with four goals in total, including two within ten seconds of each other, sealed the series for the Penguins in an 8–5 victory.

April 11	Philadelphia Flyers	0–7	Pittsburgh Penguins	PPG Paints Arena	Recap
No scoring		First period	02:38 – Bryan Rust (1); 10:07 – Carl Hagelin (1); 14:09 – Evgeni Malkin (1)
No scoring		Second period	07:50 – pp – Jake Guentzel (1); 09:01 – Sidney Crosby (1)
No scoring		Third period	07:41 – Sidney Crosby (2); 10:42 – Sidney Crosby (3)
Brian Elliott 14 saves / 19 shots Petr Mrazek 12 saves / 14 shots		Goalie stats	Matt Murray 24 saves / 24 shots

April 13	Philadelphia Flyers	5–1	Pittsburgh Penguins	PPG Paints Arena	Recap
Shayne Gostisbehere (1) – pp – 19:23		First period	No scoring
Sean Couturier (1) – 00:47		Second period	No scoring
Travis Konecny (1) – 01:29; Nolan Patrick (1) – pp – 05:10; Andrew MacDonald (1) – en – 19:44		Third period	05:27 – Patric Hornqvist (1)
Brian Elliott 34 saves / 35 shots		Goalie stats	Matt Murray 15 saves / 19 shots

April 15	Pittsburgh Penguins	5–1	Philadelphia Flyers	Wells Fargo Center	Recap
Sidney Crosby (4) – 10:25		First period	No scoring
Derick Brassard (1) – pp – 02:48; Evgeni Malkin (2) – pp – 06:48; Brian Dumoulin (1) – 06:53		Second period	13:42 – Travis Sanheim (1)
Justin Schultz (1) – pp – 07:08		Third period	No scoring
Matt Murray 26 saves / 27 shots		Goalie stats	Brian Elliott 21 saves / 26 shots

April 18	Pittsburgh Penguins	5–0	Philadelphia Flyers	Wells Fargo Center	Recap
Evgeni Malkin (3) – pp – 04:33; Phil Kessel (1) – 14:37		First period	No scoring
Kris Letang (1) – 08:04; Sidney Crosby (5) – 10:56		Second period	No scoring
Riley Sheahan (1) – 15:46		Third period	No scoring
Matt Murray 26 saves / 26 shots		Goalie stats	Brian Elliott 14 saves / 17 shots Michal Neuvirth 11 saves / 13 shots

April 20	Philadelphia Flyers	4–2	Pittsburgh Penguins	PPG Paints Arena	Recap
Claude Giroux (1) – 17:29		First period	No scoring
Valtteri Filppula (1) – sh – 18:15		Second period	12:00 – Bryan Rust (2); 16:45 – Jake Guentzel (2)
Sean Couturier (2) – 18:45; Matt Read (1) – en – 19:42		Third period	No scoring
Michal Neuvirth 30 saves / 32 shots		Goalie stats	Matt Murray 21 saves / 24 shots

April 22	Pittsburgh Penguins	8–5	Philadelphia Flyers	Wells Fargo Center	Recap
Sidney Crosby (6) – 06:30; Carl Hagelin (2) – 07:17		First period	02:15 – Sean Couturier (3); 15:48 – Andrew MacDonald (2)
Patric Hornqvist (2) – 13:35; Jake Guentzel (3) – 19:06		Second period	00:40 – Sean Couturier (4); 12:14 – Scott Laughton (1)
Jake Guentzel (4) – 00:30; Jake Guentzel (5) – 12:48; Jake Guentzel (6) – 12:58; Bryan Rust (3) – en – 19:29		Third period	17:07 – Sean Couturier (5)
Matt Murray 21 saves / 26 shots		Goalie stats	Michal Neuvirth 20 saves / 27 shots

Pittsburgh won series 4–2

=== Western Conference first round ===
==== (C1) Nashville Predators vs. (WC2) Colorado Avalanche ====
The Nashville Predators earned the Presidents' Trophy as the NHL's best regular season team with 117 points. The Colorado Avalanche finished as the Western Conference's second wild card earning 95 points. This was the first playoff meeting between these two teams. Nashville won all four games in this year's regular season series.

The Predators defeated the Avalanche in six games. Filip Forsberg scored twice in Nashville's 5–2 game one victory, one of which was considered a highlight-reel goal. Nashville had five different players score in their 5–4 victory over Colorado in game two to take a 2–0 series lead. Nathan MacKinnon scored twice and Gabriel Landeskog had a goal and two assists to take game three for the Avalanche 5–3. In game four, Pekka Rinne made 31 saves for the Predators who took a 3–1 series lead with a 3–2 win. Andrew Hammond made 44 saves and Sven Andrighetto scored with 1:28 left in the third period to force a sixth game for the Avalanche in a 2–1 triumph. The Predators shut out the Avalanche in game six, with Rinne stopping all 22 shots he faced in a 5–0 victory.

April 12	Colorado Avalanche	2–5	Nashville Predators	Bridgestone Arena	Recap
Nikita Zadorov (1) – 06:36		First period	No scoring
Blake Comeau (1) – 04:51		Second period	03:16 – Austin Watson (1); 08:50 – pp – Craig Smith (1)
No scoring		Third period	06:08 – Filip Forsberg (1); 12:10 – Filip Forsberg (2); 18:03 – en – Colton Sissons (1)
Jonathan Bernier 26 saves / 30 shots		Goalie stats	Pekka Rinne 25 saves / 27 shots

April 14	Colorado Avalanche	4–5	Nashville Predators	Bridgestone Arena	Recap
Gabriel Bourque (1) – 02:34		First period	No scoring
Nathan MacKinnon (1) – 17:08		Second period	01:01 – pp – Kevin Fiala (1); 12:36 – Viktor Arvidsson (1); 16:32 – Ryan Johansen (1)
Gabriel Landeskog (1) – pp – 09:14; Alexander Kerfoot (1) – 19:24		Third period	07:16 – Austin Watson (2); 18:51 – en – Ryan Hartman (1)
Jonathan Bernier 28 saves / 32 shots		Goalie stats	Pekka Rinne 26 saves / 30 shots

April 16	Nashville Predators	3–5	Colorado Avalanche	Pepsi Center	Recap
No scoring		First period	01:50 – Blake Comeau (2); 13:24 – Gabriel Bourque (2); 18:07 – Nathan MacKinnon (2)
Ryan Johansen (2) – pp – 10:23		Second period	04:25 – Nathan MacKinnon (3)
Colton Sissons (2) – 07:12; Austin Watson (3) – 18:45		Third period	18:24 – en – Gabriel Landeskog (2)
Pekka Rinne 11 saves / 15 shots Juuse Saros 18 saves / 18 shots		Goalie stats	Jonathan Bernier 29 saves / 32 shots

April 18	Nashville Predators	3–2	Colorado Avalanche	Pepsi Center	Recap
Filip Forsberg (3) – 15:33		First period	No scoring
Colton Sissons (3) – 07:18; Craig Smith (2) – 11:49		Second period	No scoring
No scoring		Third period	05:20 – pp – Gabriel Landeskog (3); 11:01 – Alexander Kerfoot (2)
Pekka Rinne 31 saves / 33 shots		Goalie stats	Jonathan Bernier 23 saves / 26 shots Andrew Hammond 8 saves / 8 shots

April 20	Colorado Avalanche	2–1	Nashville Predators	Bridgestone Arena	Recap
No scoring		First period	No scoring
No scoring		Second period	No scoring
Gabriel Landeskog (4) – 15:49; Sven Andrighetto (1) – 18:32		Third period	10:18 – Nick Bonino (1)
Andrew Hammond 44 saves / 45 shots		Goalie stats	Pekka Rinne 25 saves / 27 shots

April 22	Nashville Predators	5–0	Colorado Avalanche	Pepsi Center	Recap
Mattias Ekholm (1) – 07:02; Austin Watson (4) – 10:19		First period	No scoring
Filip Forsberg (4) – 00:38; Nick Bonino (2) – 08:26		Second period	No scoring
Viktor Arvidsson (2) – 02:36		Third period	No scoring
Pekka Rinne 22 saves / 22 shots		Goalie stats	Andrew Hammond 32 saves / 37 shots

Nashville won series 4–2

==== (C2) Winnipeg Jets vs. (C3) Minnesota Wild ====
The Winnipeg Jets finished second in the Central Division earning 114 points. The Minnesota Wild earned 101 points to finish third in the Central. This was the first playoff meeting between these two teams. Winnipeg won three of the four games in this year's regular season series.

The Jets defeated the Wild in five games and earned their first playoff series victory since 1987, and also the first since the reactivation of the franchise in 1999 as the Atlanta Thrashers. After firing 40 shots on Minnesota goaltender Devan Dubnyk, the Jets won game one 3–2, winning their first playoff game in franchise history and the city's first playoff victory since 1996, after which the original Jets relocated to Phoenix. In game two, Patrik Laine had a goal and an assist to provide the Jets a 4–1 victory as well as a 2–0 series lead. In game three, the Wild scored four goals to chase goaltender Connor Hellebuyck in the second period in a 6–2 affair. Hellebuyck came back in game four, stopping all 30 shots he faced in a 2–0 Jets victory. Hellebuyck continued his shutout streak in game five, stopping another 30 shots after a first period blitz by the Jets to win the series-clinching game 5–0.

April 11	Minnesota Wild	2–3	Winnipeg Jets	Bell MTS Place	Recap
No scoring		First period	No scoring
No scoring		Second period	17:37 – pp – Mark Scheifele (1)
Matt Cullen (1) – 01:46; Zach Parise (1) – 03:58		Third period	04:51 – Patrik Laine (1); 12:47 – Joe Morrow (1)
Devan Dubnyk 37 saves / 40 shots		Goalie stats	Connor Hellebuyck 18 saves / 20 shots

April 13	Minnesota Wild	1–4	Winnipeg Jets	Bell MTS Place	Recap
No scoring		First period	No scoring
No scoring		Second period	08:41 – Tyler Myers (1)
Zach Parise (2) – pp – 19:15		Third period	07:42 – Paul Stastny (1); 09:24 – Andrew Copp (1); 17:58 – Patrik Laine (2)
Devan Dubnyk 40 saves / 44 shots		Goalie stats	Connor Hellebuyck 16 saves / 17 shots

April 15	Winnipeg Jets	2–6	Minnesota Wild	Xcel Energy Center	Recap
Blake Wheeler (1) – pp – 04:50		First period	09:47 – pp – Mikael Granlund (1); 17:50 – pp – Zach Parise (3)
Tyler Myers (2) – 06:42		Second period	03:32 – Matt Dumba (1); 14:40 – Eric Staal (1); 15:00 – Jordan Greenway (1); 18:23 – Marcus Foligno (1)
No scoring		Third period	No scoring
Connor Hellebuyck 16 saves / 22 shots Steve Mason 7 saves / 7 shots		Goalie stats	Devan Dubnyk 29 saves / 31 shots

April 17	Winnipeg Jets	2–0	Minnesota Wild	Xcel Energy Center	Recap
Mark Scheifele (2) – 19:32		First period	No scoring
No scoring		Second period	No scoring
Mark Scheifele (3) – en – 19:49		Third period	No scoring
Connor Hellebuyck 30 saves / 30 shots		Goalie stats	Devan Dubnyk 26 saves / 27 shots

April 20	Minnesota Wild	0–5	Winnipeg Jets	Bell MTS Place	Recap
No scoring		First period	00:31 – Jacob Trouba (1); 05:42 – Bryan Little (1); 11:10 – Brandon Tanev (1); 11:59 – Joel Armia (1)
No scoring		Second period	No scoring
No scoring		Third period	00:32 – pp – Mark Scheifele (4)
Devan Dubnyk 6 saves / 10 shots Alex Stalock 15 saves / 16 shots		Goalie stats	Connor Hellebuyck 30 saves / 30 shots

Winnipeg won series 4–1

==== (P1) Vegas Golden Knights vs. (WC1) Los Angeles Kings ====
The Vegas Golden Knights finished first in the Pacific Division earning 109 points. The Los Angeles Kings earned 98 points to finish as the Western Conference's first wild card. This was the first playoff meeting between these two teams and the first playoff series for the Golden Knights. These teams split their four-game regular season series.

The Golden Knights defeated the Kings in a four-game sweep. In game one, Marc-Andre Fleury stopped all 30 shots to give the Golden Knights their first playoff victory. Even though Kings goaltender Jonathan Quick made 54 saves in game two, the Golden Knights topped Los Angeles in double overtime thanks to Erik Haula's goal at 15:23, taking a 2–0 series lead. After the Golden Knights took the lead late in the third period of game three with two goals in 21 seconds Vegas pushed the Kings to the brink of elimination with a 3–2 win; Vegas goaltender Marc-Andre Fleury made 37 saves in the victory. In game four, former-King Brayden McNabb scored the only goal of the game for the Golden Knights as they swept Los Angeles for their first playoff series victory. This series tied the record for the fewest goals scored by both teams in a best-of-seven playoff series: the Golden Knights scored seven goals to the Kings' three goals for a total of ten goals, tying the record set in 2003. In addition, the 7 goals scored by Vegas is the lowest amount by a series-winning team in NHL history.

April 11	Los Angeles Kings	0–1	Vegas Golden Knights	T-Mobile Arena	Recap
No scoring		First period	03:23 – Shea Theodore (1)
No scoring		Second period	No scoring
No scoring		Third period	No scoring
Jonathan Quick 27 saves / 28 shots		Goalie stats	Marc-Andre Fleury 30 saves / 30 shots

April 13	Los Angeles Kings	1–2	2OT	Vegas Golden Knights	T-Mobile Arena	Recap
No scoring		First period		14:47 – pp – Alex Tuch (1)
Paul LaDue (1) – pp – 15:55		Second period		No scoring
No scoring		Third period		No scoring
No scoring		Second overtime period		15:23 – Erik Haula (1)
Jonathan Quick 54 saves / 56 shots		Goalie stats		Marc-Andre Fleury 29 saves / 30 shots

April 15	Vegas Golden Knights	3–2	Los Angeles Kings	Staples Center	Recap
No scoring		First period	13:14 – Alex Iafallo (1)
No scoring		Second period	No scoring
Cody Eakin (1) – 06:10; James Neal (1) – 14:23; William Karlsson (1) – 14:44		Third period	17:56 – Anze Kopitar (1)
Marc-Andre Fleury 37 saves / 39 shots		Goalie stats	Jonathan Quick 23 saves / 26 shots

April 17	Vegas Golden Knights	1–0	Los Angeles Kings	Staples Center	Recap
No scoring		First period	No scoring
Brayden McNabb (1) – 04:04		Second period	No scoring
No scoring		Third period	No scoring
Marc-Andre Fleury 31 saves / 31 shots		Goalie stats	Jonathan Quick 20 saves / 21 shots

Vegas won series 4–0

==== (P2) Anaheim Ducks vs. (P3) San Jose Sharks ====
The Anaheim Ducks finished second in the Pacific Division earning 101 points. The San Jose Sharks earned 100 points to finish third in the Pacific Division. This was the second playoff meeting between these teams. Their only previous meeting was in the 2009 Western Conference quarterfinals, which Anaheim won in six games. San Jose won three of the four games in this year's regular season series.

The Sharks defeated the Ducks in a four-game sweep; the Sharks were the only team without home ice advantage in the first round to advance. Evander Kane scored twice in his first playoff game and Sharks goaltender Martin Jones posted a 25-save shutout blanking the Ducks 3–0 in game one. In game two, Logan Couture scored a goal and recorded an assist in a 3–2 victory. Martin Jones made 45 saves as the Sharks routed the Ducks 8–1 in game three; eight different players scored for San Jose in the victory. Tomas Hertl broke the tie for San Jose, scoring the series-clinching goal midway through the third period of game four as the Sharks defeated Anaheim 2–1.

April 12	San Jose Sharks	3–0	Anaheim Ducks	Honda Center	Recap
No scoring		First period	No scoring
Evander Kane (1) – pp – 07:07; Evander Kane (2) – 13:51; Brent Burns (1) – 15:15		Second period	No scoring
No scoring		Third period	No scoring
Martin Jones 25 saves / 25 shots		Goalie stats	John Gibson 31 saves / 34 shots

April 14	San Jose Sharks	3–2	Anaheim Ducks	Honda Center	Recap
Marcus Sorensen (1) – 09:41; Logan Couture (1) – pp – 14:41		First period	00:40 – Jakob Silfverberg (1)
Tomas Hertl (1) – 01:11		Second period	07:51 – pp – Hampus Lindholm (1)
No scoring		Third period	No scoring
Martin Jones 28 saves / 30 shots		Goalie stats	John Gibson 32 saves / 35 shots

April 16	Anaheim Ducks	1–8	San Jose Sharks	SAP Center	Recap
Rickard Rakell (1) – pp – 13:40		First period	03:44 – Logan Couture (2)
No scoring		Second period	01:15 – Joonas Donskoi (1); 03:41 – Marcus Sorensen (2); 13:43 – Eric Fehr (1); 16:49 – pp – Tomas Hertl (2)
No scoring		Third period	10:04 – pp – Joe Pavelski (1); 17:16 – pp – Evander Kane (3); 19:36 – pp – Timo Meier (1)
John Gibson 19 saves / 24 shots Ryan Miller 9 saves / 12 shots		Goalie stats	Martin Jones 45 saves / 46 shots

April 18	Anaheim Ducks	1–2	San Jose Sharks	SAP Center	Recap
No scoring		First period	05:43 – Marcus Sorensen (3)
No scoring		Second period	No scoring
Andrew Cogliano (1) – 07:53		Third period	09:09 – Tomas Hertl (3)
John Gibson 22 saves / 24 shots		Goalie stats	Martin Jones 30 saves / 31 shots

San Jose won series 4–0

== Second round ==
=== Eastern Conference second round ===
==== (A1) Tampa Bay Lightning vs. (A2) Boston Bruins ====
This was the second playoff meeting between these two teams. Their only previous series occurred in the 2011 Eastern Conference final, which Boston won in seven games. Boston won three of the four games in this year's regular season series.

The Lightning defeated the Bruins in five games. In game one, the line of Brad Marchand, Patrice Bergeron, and David Pastrnak combined for eleven points in a 6–2 triumph. Brayden Point scored a goal and recorded three assists in the Lightning's 4–2 victory in game two, evening the series. Ondrej Palat scored twice in the Lightning's 4–1 win in game three taking a 2–1 series lead. Tampa Bay captain Steven Stamkos forced overtime on a controversial goal. While circling behind the net Bruin defender Charlie McAvoy was hauled down by Nikita Kucherov leading to a turnover deep in the Bruins defensive zone. Daniel Girardi scored the game-winning goal to give the Lightning a 4–3 victory. During game four, Brad Marchand licked the face of Tampa Bay forward Ryan Callahan during a scrum. Marchand received no penalty or further punishment from the League. The Lightning scored twice in the second period of game five to take the lead and Anton Stralman scored an empty-net goal to give Tampa Bay a 3–1 victory and a 4–1 series win.

April 28	Boston Bruins	6–2	Tampa Bay Lightning	Amalie Arena	Recap
Rick Nash (2) – pp – 17:11		First period	No scoring
Patrice Bergeron (2) – 00:42; Rick Nash (3) – 12:33		Second period	02:31 – Daniel Girardi (1); 13:22 – pp – Mikhail Sergachev (2)
Brad Marchand (4) – 03:32; Patrice Bergeron (3) – 10:11; Jake DeBrusk (6) – en – 13:41		Third period	No scoring
Tuukka Rask 34 saves / 36 shots		Goalie stats	Andrei Vasilevskiy 18 saves / 23 shots

April 30	Boston Bruins	2–4	Tampa Bay Lightning	Amalie Arena	Recap
Charlie McAvoy (1) – 18:30		First period	11:47 – pp – Yanni Gourde (2)
No scoring		Second period	10:14 – Tyler Johnson (3)
Torey Krug (3) – 15:58		Third period	14:08 – Ondrej Palat (2); 19:34 – en – Brayden Point (2)
Tuukka Rask 27 saves / 30 shots		Goalie stats	Andrei Vasilevskiy 18 saves / 20 shots

May 2	Tampa Bay Lightning	4–1	Boston Bruins	TD Garden	Recap
Ondrej Palat (3) – 01:47; Ondrej Palat (4) – 03:19; Anthony Cirelli (1) – 16:43		First period	14:12 – pp – Patrice Bergeron (4)
No scoring		Second period	No scoring
Steven Stamkos (2) – en – 19:18		Third period	No scoring
Andrei Vasilevskiy 28 saves / 29 shots		Goalie stats	Tuukka Rask 33 saves / 36 shots

May 4	Tampa Bay Lightning	4–3	OT	Boston Bruins	TD Garden	Recap
Brayden Point (3) – 04:36; Nikita Kucherov (6) – pp – 09:53		First period		15:28 – pp – David Pastrnak (6)
No scoring		Second period		02:04 – pp – Patrice Bergeron (5)
Steven Stamkos (3) – 12:56		Third period		06:36 – sh – Patrice Bergeron (6)
Daniel Girardi (2) – 03:18		First overtime period		No scoring
Andrei Vasilevskiy 29 saves / 32 shots		Goalie stats		Tuukka Rask 24 saves / 28 shots

May 6	Boston Bruins	1–3	Tampa Bay Lightning	Amalie Arena	Recap
David Krejci (3) – pp – 19:12		First period	No scoring
No scoring		Second period	10:43 – Brayden Point (4); 14:00 – pp – J. T. Miller (2)
No scoring		Third period	18:31 – en – Anton Stralman (1)
Tuukka Rask 19 saves / 21 shots		Goalie stats	Andrei Vasilevskiy 27 saves / 28 shots

Tampa Bay won series 4–1

==== (M1) Washington Capitals vs. (M2) Pittsburgh Penguins ====
This was the third consecutive year that these two rivals have met in the second round and was the eleventh overall playoff meeting with Pittsburgh winning nine of the ten previous series. They last met in the previous year's Eastern Conference second round which Pittsburgh won in seven games. These teams split their four-game regular season series.

The Capitals defeated the Penguins in six games, defeating Pittsburgh for the second time in franchise history and the first time since 1994. Pittsburgh rallied from a two-goal deficit to take game one 3–2 leading on Jake Guentzel's goal and two assists. In game two, Braden Holtby made 32 saves for Washington, defeating the Penguins 4–1. Alexander Ovechkin scored with 1:07 left in the third period of game three to give the Capitals a 4–3 victory. During the game, Tom Wilson made an illegal check to the head of rookie Zach Aston-Reese who suffered a broken jaw along with a concussion. Wilson was suspended three games for his action. In game four, Guentzel scored twice for Pittsburgh in a 3–1 victory, evening the series 2–2. Both Evgeny Kuznetsov and Jakub Vrana had a goal and two assists for the Capitals in game five who took a 3–2 series lead after a 6–3 victory. In game six, the Capitals fired 30 shots and Evgeny Kuznetsov's goal in overtime ended the series in a 2–1 victory, moving Washington to the Conference finals for the first time since 1998.

April 26	Pittsburgh Penguins	3–2	Washington Capitals	Capital One Arena	Recap
No scoring		First period	00:17 – Evgeny Kuznetsov (5)
No scoring		Second period	No scoring
Patric Hornqvist (3) – 02:59; Sidney Crosby (7) – 05:20; Jake Guentzel (7) – 07:48		Third period	00:28 – Alexander Ovechkin (6)
Matt Murray 32 saves / 34 shots		Goalie stats	Braden Holtby 22 saves / 25 shots

April 29	Pittsburgh Penguins	1–4	Washington Capitals	Capital One Arena	Recap
No scoring		First period	01:26 – Alexander Ovechkin (7); 14:54 – pp – Jakub Vrana (1)
Kris Letang (2) – 13:04		Second period	02:08 – Brett Connolly (1)
No scoring		Third period	19:53 – en – Nicklas Backstrom (3)
Matt Murray 28 saves / 31 shots		Goalie stats	Braden Holtby 32 saves / 33 shots

May 1	Washington Capitals	4–3	Pittsburgh Penguins	PPG Paints Arena	Recap
No scoring		First period	No scoring
John Carlson (2) – pp – 00:48; Chandler Stephenson (2) – 11:04		Second period	04:33 – Jake Guentzel (8); 06:49 – pp – Patric Hornqvist (4); 16:27 – Sidney Crosby (8)
Matt Niskanen (1) – 05:06; Alexander Ovechkin (8) – 18:53		Third period	No scoring
Braden Holtby 19 saves / 22 shots		Goalie stats	Matt Murray 18 saves / 22 shots

May 3	Washington Capitals	1–3	Pittsburgh Penguins	PPG Paints Arena	Recap
No scoring		First period	No scoring
T. J. Oshie (4) – pp – 12:55		Second period	09:21 – Jake Guentzel (9); 17:31 – pp – Evgeni Malkin (4)
No scoring		Third period	19:02 – pp-en – Jake Guentzel (10)
Braden Holtby 21 saves / 23 shots		Goalie stats	Matt Murray 20 saves / 21 shots

May 5	Pittsburgh Penguins	3–6	Washington Capitals	Capital One Arena	Recap
Jamie Oleksiak (1) – 02:21		First period	18:22 – pp – John Carlson (3); 18:55 – Brett Connolly (2)
Sidney Crosby (9) – pp – 04:43; Patric Hornqvist (5) – pp – 07:45		Second period	No scoring
No scoring		Third period	00:52 – Evgeny Kuznetsov (6); 15:22 – Jakub Vrana (2); 18:29 – en – T. J. Oshie (5); 19:54 – en – Lars Eller (3)
Matt Murray 26 saves / 30 shots		Goalie stats	Braden Holtby 36 saves / 39 shots

May 7	Washington Capitals	2–1	OT	Pittsburgh Penguins	PPG Paints Arena	Recap
No scoring		First period		No scoring
Alex Chiasson (1) – 02:13		Second period		11:52 – Kris Letang (3)
No scoring		Third period		No scoring
Evgeny Kuznetsov (7) – 05:27		First overtime period		No scoring
Braden Holtby 21 saves / 22 shots		Goalie stats		Matt Murray 28 saves / 30 shots

Washington won series 4–2

=== Western Conference second round ===
==== (C1) Nashville Predators vs. (C2) Winnipeg Jets ====
This was the first playoff meeting between these two teams. Nashville won three of the five games in this year's regular season series.

The Jets eliminated the Predators in seven games. Mark Scheifele scored twice and Jets goaltender Connor Hellebuyck made 47 saves in game one to defeat the Predators 4–1. In game two, Kevin Fiala scored 5:37 into overtime to give the Predators a 5–4 victory to even the series. The Jets overcame a three-goal deficit in game three with both Blake Wheeler and Dustin Byfuglien scoring twice in a 7–4 win. Pekka Rinne made 32 saves for the Predators in game four, allowing his team to win 2–1 and even the series 2–2. In game five, Kyle Connor scored twice and captain Blake Wheeler provided three assists in the Jets' 6–2 victory. The Predators forced a seventh game following game six in which both Viktor Arvidsson and Filip Forsberg scored twice and recorded an assist along with Pekka Rinne stopping all 34 shots in a 4–0 shutout. After recording a shutout the game prior, Pekka Rinne got pulled for the third time in the series after letting in the first two goals of game seven. His counterpart, Connor Hellebuyck, made 36 saves in the victory as the Jets won the game 5–1, advancing Winnipeg to the Conference finals for the first time in franchise history.

April 27	Winnipeg Jets	4–1	Nashville Predators	Bridgestone Arena	Recap
Brandon Tanev (2) – 14:51		First period	No scoring
Paul Stastny (2) – 09:01; Mark Scheifele (5) – 17:51		Second period	No scoring
Mark Scheifele (6) – en – 19:24		Third period	01:23 – Kevin Fiala (2)
Connor Hellebuyck 47 saves / 48 shots		Goalie stats	Pekka Rinne 13 saves / 16 shots Juuse Saros 2 saves / 2 shots

April 29	Winnipeg Jets	4–5	2OT	Nashville Predators	Bridgestone Arena	Recap
Dustin Byfuglien (1) – 12:47; Mark Scheifele (7) – pp – 13:16		First period		00:27 – Ryan Johansen (3)
No scoring		Second period		05:04 – pp – P. K. Subban (1); 18:41 – Viktor Arvidsson (3)
Brandon Tanev (3) – 05:11; Mark Scheifele (8) – 18:55		Third period		05:45 – Ryan Johansen (4)
No scoring		Second overtime period		05:37 – Kevin Fiala (3)
Connor Hellebuyck 36 saves / 41 shots		Goalie stats		Pekka Rinne 46 saves / 50 shots

May 1	Nashville Predators	4–7	Winnipeg Jets	Bell MTS Place	Recap
Mike Fisher (1) – 04:53; P. K. Subban (2) – pp – 10:06; Austin Watson (5) – 17:35		First period	No scoring
No scoring		Second period	02:38 – Paul Stastny (3); 05:11 – Dustin Byfuglien (2); 05:29 – Jacob Trouba (2); 19:15 – Dustin Byfuglien (3)
Filip Forsberg (5) – pp – 07:40		Third period	15:01 – pp – Blake Wheeler (2); 19:09 – en – Blake Wheeler (3); 19:29 – en – Brandon Tanev (4)
Pekka Rinne 38 saves / 43 shots		Goalie stats	Connor Hellebuyck 26 saves / 30 shots

May 3	Nashville Predators	2–1	Winnipeg Jets	Bell MTS Place	Recap
Ryan Hartman (2) – 17:20		First period	No scoring
P. K. Subban (3) – pp – 14:36		Second period	No scoring
No scoring		Third period	19:09 – pp – Patrik Laine (3)
Pekka Rinne 32 saves / 33 shots		Goalie stats	Connor Hellebuyck 27 saves / 29 shots

May 5	Winnipeg Jets	6–2	Nashville Predators	Bridgestone Arena	Recap
No scoring		First period	No scoring
Paul Stastny (4) – 07:44; Kyle Connor (1) – 12:30; Dustin Byfuglien (4) – 14:35; Kyle Connor (2) – 17:01		Second period	11:08 – Yannick Weber (1); 17:59 – sh – Ryan Johansen (5)
Mark Scheifele (9) – 00:28; Mathieu Perreault (1) – pp – 06:23		Third period	No scoring
Connor Hellebuyck 38 saves / 40 shots		Goalie stats	Pekka Rinne 20 saves / 26 shots Juuse Saros 6 saves / 6 shots

May 7	Nashville Predators	4–0	Winnipeg Jets	Bell MTS Place	Recap
Viktor Arvidsson (4) – 01:02		First period	No scoring
Filip Forsberg (6) – 08:16		Second period	No scoring
Filip Forsberg (7) – 05:55; Viktor Arvidsson (5) – en – 15:58		Third period	No scoring
Pekka Rinne 34 saves / 34 shots		Goalie stats	Connor Hellebuyck 25 saves / 28 shots

May 10	Winnipeg Jets	5–1	Nashville Predators	Bridgestone Arena	Recap
Tyler Myers (3) – 08:41; Paul Stastny (5) – 10:47		First period	15:54 – pp – P. K. Subban (4)
Mark Scheifele (10) – 17:50		Second period	No scoring
Paul Stastny (6) – pp – 11:59; Mark Scheifele (11) – en – 17:27		Third period	No scoring
Connor Hellebuyck 36 saves / 37 shots		Goalie stats	Pekka Rinne 5 saves / 7 shots Juuse Saros 14 saves / 16 shots

Winnipeg won series 4–3

==== (P1) Vegas Golden Knights vs. (P3) San Jose Sharks ====
This was the first playoff series between these two teams. Vegas won three of the four games in this year's regular season series.

The Golden Knights defeated the Sharks in six games. In game one, Marc-Andre Fleury stopped all 33 shots he faced and Vegas scored with seven different players to defeat San Jose 7–0. The Sharks used double-overtime to take game two 4–3 as Logan Couture's second goal of the game ended the Golden Knights' playoff winning streak. Game three also went into overtime; however, this time the Golden Knights' William Karlsson got the best of the Sharks, scoring the overtime-winner in a 4–3 victory for Vegas Martin Jones shut out the Golden Knights in game four, stopping all 34 shots he faced, giving the Sharks a 4–0 victory to even the series 2–2. After the Golden Knights put up a 4–0 lead in game five, including two goals from rookie Alex Tuch, the Sharks scored three goals to come within one goal. However, Vegas halted the comeback when Jonathan Marchessault scored an empty-net goal to secure a 5–3 win. In game six, Fleury recorded a 28-save shut out in a 3–0 victory to send the Golden Knights to their first Conference finals.

April 26	San Jose Sharks	0–7	Vegas Golden Knights	T-Mobile Arena	Recap
No scoring		First period	04:31 – Cody Eakin (2); 04:57 – Erik Haula (2); 06:02 – Jonathan Marchessault (1); 11:43 – pp – Alex Tuch (2)
No scoring		Second period	03:28 – Shea Theodore (2)
No scoring		Third period	04:32 – pp – Colin Miller (1); 08:09 – pp – James Neal (2)
Martin Jones 8 saves / 13 shots Aaron Dell 19 saves / 21 shots		Goalie stats	Marc-Andre Fleury 33 saves / 33 shots

April 28	San Jose Sharks	4–3	2OT	Vegas Golden Knights	T-Mobile Arena	Recap
No scoring		First period		17:59 – William Karlsson (2)
Brent Burns (2) – pp – 02:00; Logan Couture (3) – 11:08; Brent Burns (3) – 14:07		Second period		00:26 – William Karlsson (3)
No scoring		Third period		13:28 – Nate Schmidt (1)
Logan Couture (4) – pp – 05:13		Second overtime period		No scoring
Martin Jones 26 saves / 29 shots		Goalie stats		Marc-Andre Fleury 43 saves / 47 shots

April 30	Vegas Golden Knights	4–3	OT	San Jose Sharks	SAP Center	Recap
No scoring		First period		No scoring
Colin Miller (2) – pp – 09:40; Jonathan Marchessault (2) – pp – 13:09; Reilly Smith (1) – 14:26		Second period		06:59 – pp – Timo Meier (2)
No scoring		Third period		07:49 – Evander Kane (4); 18:03 – Tomas Hertl (4)
William Karlsson (4) – 08:17		First overtime period		No scoring
Marc-Andre Fleury 39 saves / 42 shots		Goalie stats		Martin Jones 29 saves / 33 shots

May 2	Vegas Golden Knights	0–4	San Jose Sharks	SAP Center	Recap
No scoring		First period	15:37 – Marcus Sorensen (4); 19:54 – Joonas Donskoi (2)
No scoring		Second period	05:35 – Tomas Hertl (5)
No scoring		Third period	11:43 – pp – Joe Pavelski (2)
Marc-Andre Fleury 30 saves / 34 shots		Goalie stats	Martin Jones 34 saves / 34 shots

May 4	San Jose Sharks	3–5	Vegas Golden Knights	T-Mobile Arena	Recap
No scoring		First period	19:57 – James Neal (3)
No scoring		Second period	04:52 – pp – Alex Tuch (3); 08:59 – Erik Haula (3)
Kevin Labanc (1) – pp – 09:35; Tomas Hertl (6) – 11:44; Mikkel Boedker (1) – 15:44		Third period	08:36 – Alex Tuch (4); 18:39 – en – Jonathan Marchessault (3)
Martin Jones 27 saves / 31 shots Aaron Dell 7 saves / 7 shots		Goalie stats	Marc-Andre Fleury 27 saves / 30 shots

May 6	Vegas Golden Knights	3–0	San Jose Sharks	SAP Center	Recap
No scoring		First period	No scoring
Jonathan Marchessault (4) – 06:33; Nate Schmidt (2) – 15:38		Second period	No scoring
Cody Eakin (3) – en – 18:09		Third period	No scoring
Marc-Andre Fleury 28 saves / 28 shots		Goalie stats	Martin Jones 30 saves / 32 shots

Vegas won series 4–2

== Conference finals ==
=== Eastern Conference final ===
==== (A1) Tampa Bay Lightning vs. (M1) Washington Capitals ====
This was the third playoff meeting between these teams with Tampa Bay winning both previous series. They last met in the 2011 Eastern Conference semifinals, which Tampa Bay won in a four-game sweep. Also since 2011, this was the first conference final between two division champions. This was the Lightning's fifth appearance in the conference finals, and their third in the last four seasons. Tampa Bay last went to the Conference finals in 2016; they lost to the Pittsburgh Penguins in seven games. This was Washington's third conference finals appearance. They last made the conference finals in 1998; they defeated the Buffalo Sabres in six games. Tampa Bay won two of the three games in this year's regular season series.

The Capitals defeated the Lightning in seven games. In game one, Washington scored four consecutive goals across the first two periods forcing Tampa Bay coach Jon Cooper to pull goalie Andrei Vasilevskiy; the Capitals won 4–2. Lars Eller and Evgeny Kuznetsov had a goal and two assists in Washington's 6–2 triumph in game two. The Lightning struck back in game three as Victor Hedman potted a goal and two assists in Tampa's 4–2 victory. Andrei Vasilevskiy made 36 saves in game four as the Lightning won the game 4–2 and thus tied the series. In game five, Ryan Callahan had a goal and an assist for the Lightning as they hung on for 3–2 victory. In game six, Capitals goaltender Braden Holtby made 24 saves in a 3–0 shutout victory to force a seventh game. Braden Holtby stopped all 29 shots and Andre Burakovsky scored twice in game seven for Washington, advancing the Capitals to the Finals for the first time since 1998 in a 4–0 victory.

May 11	Washington Capitals	4–2	Tampa Bay Lightning	Amalie Arena	Recap
Michal Kempny (1) – 07:28; Alexander Ovechkin (9) – pp – 19:54		First period	No scoring
Jay Beagle (2) – 02:40; Lars Eller (4) – pp – 06:42		Second period	No scoring
No scoring		Third period	03:45 – pp – Steven Stamkos (4); 13:03 – Ondrej Palat (5)
Braden Holtby 19 saves / 21 shots		Goalie stats	Andrei Vasilevskiy 21 saves / 25 shots Louis Domingue 7 saves / 7 shots

May 13	Washington Capitals	6–2	Tampa Bay Lightning	Amalie Arena	Recap
Tom Wilson (3) – 00:28		First period	07:08 – pp – Brayden Point (5); 10:22 – pp – Steven Stamkos (5)
Devante Smith-Pelly (3) – 02:50; Lars Eller (5) – 18:58; Evgeny Kuznetsov (8) – pp – 19:57		Second period	No scoring
Alexander Ovechkin (10) – 03:34; Brett Connolly (3) – 12:57		Third period	No scoring
Braden Holtby 33 saves / 35 shots		Goalie stats	Andrei Vasilevskiy 31 saves / 37 shots

May 15	Tampa Bay Lightning	4–2	Washington Capitals	Capital One Arena	Recap
Steven Stamkos (6) – pp – 13:53		First period	No scoring
Nikita Kucherov (7) – pp – 01:50; Victor Hedman (1) – 03:37; Brayden Point (6) – 16:03		Second period	10:31 – Brett Connolly (4)
No scoring		Third period	16:58 – Evgeny Kuznetsov (9)
Andrei Vasilevskiy 36 saves / 38 shots		Goalie stats	Braden Holtby 19 saves / 23 shots

May 17	Tampa Bay Lightning	4–2	Washington Capitals	Capital One Arena	Recap
Brayden Point (7) – 05:38; Steven Stamkos (7) – pp – 08:32		First period	04:28 – Dmitry Orlov (2)
No scoring		Second period	05:18 – Evgeny Kuznetsov (10)
Alex Killorn (5) – 11:57; Anthony Cirelli (2) – en – 19:58		Third period	No scoring
Andrei Vasilevskiy 36 saves / 38 shots		Goalie stats	Braden Holtby 16 saves / 19 shots

May 19	Washington Capitals	2–3	Tampa Bay Lightning	Amalie Arena	Recap
No scoring		First period	00:19 – Cedric Paquette (1); 09:04 – Ondrej Palat (6)
Evgeny Kuznetsov (11) – 04:21		Second period	00:33 – Ryan Callahan (2)
Alexander Ovechkin (11) – 18:24		Third period	No scoring
Braden Holtby 19 saves / 22 shots		Goalie stats	Andrei Vasilevskiy 28 saves / 30 shots

May 21	Tampa Bay Lightning	0–3	Washington Capitals	Capital One Arena	Recap
No scoring		First period	No scoring
No scoring		Second period	15:12 – pp – T. J. Oshie (6)
No scoring		Third period	10:02 – Devante Smith-Pelly (4); 19:10 – en – T. J. Oshie (7)
Andrei Vasilevskiy 31 saves / 33 shots		Goalie stats	Braden Holtby 24 saves / 24 shots

May 23	Washington Capitals	4–0	Tampa Bay Lightning	Amalie Arena	Recap
Alexander Ovechkin (12) – 01:02		First period	No scoring
Andre Burakovsky (1) – 08:59; Andre Burakovsky (2) – 16:31		Second period	No scoring
Nicklas Backstrom (4) – en – 16:17		Third period	No scoring
Braden Holtby 29 saves / 29 shots		Goalie stats	Andrei Vasilevskiy 19 saves / 22 shots

Washington won series 4–3

=== Western Conference final ===
==== (C2) Winnipeg Jets vs. (P1) Vegas Golden Knights ====
This was the first playoff meeting between these two teams. This was the first time since 2003 where two teams were making their conference finals debut. The Jets advanced to the conference finals for the first time in their 19th year (seventh in Winnipeg) after entering the league in 1999 as the Atlanta Thrashers; they also became the first Winnipeg-based team in league history to make it past the second round. Vegas made the conference finals in their inaugural season becoming the first expansion team since the St. Louis Blues in 1968 to advance past the second round of the playoffs. Vegas won two of the three games in this year's regular season series.

The Golden Knights defeated the Jets in five games. In game one, Mark Scheifele scored a goal and recorded an assist in a 4–2 triumph over the Golden Knights. Jonathan Marchessault scored twice in Vegas' bounce-back win in game two, evening the series after a 3–1 victory. Marc-Andre Fleury made 33 saves for Vegas, including 15 in the third period of game three, to take a 4–2 victory. Fleury made an additional 35 saves in game four with Vegas forward Reilly Smith scoring the game-winning goal 13:02 into the third period. In game five, the Golden Knights held onto a 2–1 lead, after Ryan Reaves scored in the second period to break the tie, to win the game and became the first expansion team to move onto the Stanley Cup Final since the St. Louis Blues in 1968.

May 12	Vegas Golden Knights	2–4	Winnipeg Jets	Bell MTS Place	Recap
Brayden McNabb (2) – 08:10		First period	01:05 – Dustin Byfuglien (5); 06:49 – pp – Patrik Laine (4); 07:35 – Joel Armia (2)
William Karlsson (5) – pp – 15:55		Second period	09:54 – pp – Mark Scheifele (12)
No scoring		Third period	No scoring
Marc-Andre Fleury 22 saves / 26 shots		Goalie stats	Connor Hellebuyck 19 saves / 21 shots

May 14	Vegas Golden Knights	3–1	Winnipeg Jets	Bell MTS Place	Recap
Tomas Tatar (1) – 13:23; Jonathan Marchessault (5) – 17:22		First period	No scoring
No scoring		Second period	No scoring
Jonathan Marchessault (6) – 08:45		Third period	07:17 – pp – Kyle Connor (3)
Marc-Andre Fleury 30 saves / 31 shots		Goalie stats	Connor Hellebuyck 25 saves / 28 shots

May 16	Winnipeg Jets	2–4	Vegas Golden Knights	T-Mobile Arena	Recap
No scoring		First period	00:35 – Jonathan Marchessault (7)
Mark Scheifele (13) – 05:28		Second period	05:40 – James Neal (4); 08:13 – Alex Tuch (5)
Mark Scheifele (14) – 00:18		Third period	19:57 – en – Jonathan Marchessault (8)
Connor Hellebuyck 26 saves / 29 shots		Goalie stats	Marc-Andre Fleury 33 saves / 35 shots

May 18	Winnipeg Jets	2–3	Vegas Golden Knights	T-Mobile Arena	Recap
No scoring		First period	02:25 – pp – William Karlsson (6)
Patrik Laine (5) – pp – 09:29		Second period	10:12 – Tomas Nosek (1)
Tyler Myers (4) – 05:34		Third period	13:02 – Reilly Smith (2)
Connor Hellebuyck 26 saves / 29 shots		Goalie stats	Marc-Andre Fleury 35 saves / 37 shots

May 20	Vegas Golden Knights	2–1	Winnipeg Jets	Bell MTS Place	Recap
Alex Tuch (6) – 05:11		First period	17:14 – Josh Morrissey (1)
Ryan Reaves (1) – 13:21		Second period	No scoring
No scoring		Third period	No scoring
Marc-Andre Fleury 31 saves / 32 shots		Goalie stats	Connor Hellebuyck 30 saves / 32 shots

Vegas won series 4–1

== Stanley Cup Final ==
This was the first playoff meeting between these two teams. Vegas made their Finals debut in their inaugural season, becoming the first team since the aforementioned St. Louis Blues to make the Finals in their first season. Washington made their second Finals appearance. Their only previous appearance in the Finals ended in a four-game sweep by the Detroit Red Wings in 1998. This was the first Finals since 2007 to feature two teams that had not previously won a Stanley Cup. Vegas won both games in this year's regular season series.

May 28	Washington Capitals	4–6	Vegas Golden Knights	T-Mobile Arena	Recap
Brett Connolly (5) – 14:41; Nicklas Backstrom (5) – 15:23		First period	07:15 – pp – Colin Miller (3); 18:19 – William Karlsson (7)
John Carlson (4) – 08:29		Second period	03:21 – Reilly Smith (3)
Tom Wilson (4) – 01:10		Third period	02:41 – Ryan Reaves (2); 09:44 – Tomas Nosek (2); 19:57 – en – Tomas Nosek (3)
Braden Holtby 28 saves / 33 shots		Goalie stats	Marc-Andre Fleury 24 saves / 28 shots

May 30	Washington Capitals	3–2	Vegas Golden Knights	T-Mobile Arena	Recap
Lars Eller (6) – 17:27		First period	07:58 – James Neal (5)
Alexander Ovechkin (13) – pp – 05:38; Brooks Orpik (1) – 09:41		Second period	17:47 – pp – Shea Theodore (3)
No scoring		Third period	No scoring
Braden Holtby 37 saves / 39 shots		Goalie stats	Marc-Andre Fleury 23 saves / 26 shots

June 2	Vegas Golden Knights	1–3	Washington Capitals	Capital One Arena	Recap
No scoring		First period	No scoring
No scoring		Second period	01:10 – Alexander Ovechkin (14); 12:50 – Evgeny Kuznetsov (12)
Tomas Nosek (4) – 03:29		Third period	13:53 – Devante Smith-Pelly (5)
Marc-Andre Fleury 23 saves / 26 shots		Goalie stats	Braden Holtby 21 saves / 22 shots

June 4	Vegas Golden Knights	2–6	Washington Capitals	Capital One Arena	Recap
No scoring		First period	09:54 – pp – T. J. Oshie (8); 16:26 – Tom Wilson (5); 19:39 – Devante Smith-Pelly (6)
No scoring		Second period	15:23 – pp – John Carlson (5)
James Neal (6) – 05:43; Reilly Smith (4) – 12:26		Third period	13:39 – Michal Kempny (2); 18:51 – pp – Brett Connolly (6)
Marc-Andre Fleury 17 saves / 23 shots		Goalie stats	Braden Holtby 28 saves / 30 shots

June 7	Washington Capitals	4–3	Vegas Golden Knights	T-Mobile Arena	Recap
No scoring		First period	No scoring
Jakub Vrana (3) – 06:24; Alexander Ovechkin (15) – pp – 10:14		Second period	09:40 – Nate Schmidt (3); 12:56 – David Perron (1); 19:31 – pp – Reilly Smith (5)
Devante Smith-Pelly (7) – 09:52; Lars Eller (7) – 12:23		Third period	No scoring
Braden Holtby 28 saves / 31 shots		Goalie stats	Marc-Andre Fleury 29 saves / 33 shots

Washington won series 4–1

== Player statistics ==
=== Skaters ===
These are the top ten skaters based on points.

Player	Team	GP	G	A	Pts	+/–	PIM
Evgeny Kuznetsov	Washington Capitals	24	12	20	32	+12	16
Alexander Ovechkin	Washington Capitals	24	15	12	27	+8	8
Nicklas Backstrom	Washington Capitals	20	5	18	23	–1	6
Reilly Smith	Vegas Golden Knights	20	5	17	22	+5	10
Jake Guentzel	Pittsburgh Penguins	12	10	11	21	+10	8
Sidney Crosby	Pittsburgh Penguins	12	9	12	21	+7	6
Jonathan Marchessault	Vegas Golden Knights	20	8	13	21	+8	10
T. J. Oshie	Washington Capitals	24	8	13	21	+5	31
Blake Wheeler	Winnipeg Jets	17	3	18	21	+2	10
Mark Scheifele	Winnipeg Jets	17	14	6	20	+6	10

=== Goaltenders ===
This is a combined table of the top five goaltenders based on goals against average and the top five goaltenders based on save percentage, with at least 420 minutes. The table is sorted by GAA, and the criteria for inclusion are bolded.

Player	Team	GP	W	L	SA	GA	GAA	SV%	SO	TOI
Braden Holtby	Washington Capitals	23	16	7	639	50	**2.16**	**.922**	2	1385:45
Marc-Andre Fleury	Vegas Golden Knights	20	13	7	641	47	**2.24**	**.927**	4	1258:35
Martin Jones	San Jose Sharks	10	6	4	304	22	**2.26**	**.928**	2	584:40
Connor Hellebuyck	Winnipeg Jets	17	9	8	511	40	**2.36**	**.922**	2	1015:07
Matt Murray	Pittsburgh Penguins	12	6	6	314	29	**2.43**	.908	2	715:35
Andrei Vasilevskiy	Tampa Bay Lightning	17	11	6	524	43	2.58	**.918**	0	999:09

== Television ==
This was the seventh postseason under NBC Sports' current 10-year contract for American television rights to the NHL. All national coverage of games was aired on either NBCSN, the NBC broadcast network, NHL Network, USA Network, or CNBC. Due to original programming commitments involving CNBC and USA Network, two first round games on April 18 were aired by Golf Channel. During the first round, excluding games exclusively broadcast on NBC, the regional rights holders of each participating U.S. team produced local telecasts of their respective games. For the second year, the first round national broadcasts were not blacked out on television in the markets of participating teams, and could co-exist with the local broadcasts (however, NBC-provided coverage was restricted in Pittsburgh and Las Vegas, where AT&T SportsNet holds the regional rights to the Penguins and the Golden Knights respectively).

In Canada, this marked the fourth postseason under Rogers Media's 12-year contract. Games aired across Sportsnet, SN1, SN360, FX, and CBC under the Hockey Night in Canada brand. Games were also streamed on Sportsnet Now, CBCSports.ca (for games televised by CBC), or the subscription service Rogers NHL Live. All games in the Winnipeg Jets' first round series against the Minnesota Wild were assigned to Sportsnet, due to the Toronto Maple Leafs' series against the Boston Bruins being prioritized to CBC, and to encourage subscriptions to Sportsnet since it was not carried on basic cable in Winnipeg.

In a surprise move, Sportsnet did not give any on-air assignments to Bob Cole during the playoffs—an exclusion that caught the veteran commentator off-guard. Instead, Sportsnet replaced Cole with Calgary Flames announcer Rick Ball, joining Jim Hughson, Paul Romanuk and Dave Randorf on play-by-play during the first two rounds of the playoffs. It was subsequently announced that Cole would retire from broadcasting the following season.

Fuelled by viewer interest in the Golden Knights' inaugural season and playoff run, and in Canada, the deep playoff run of the Winnipeg Jets, viewership of these playoffs saw noticeable increases. NBC reported that viewership of the conference finals collectively saw a 15% increase over 2017, with an average cross-platform viewership of 1.841 million (23% increase year-over-year) for the Western Conference finals featuring the Golden Knights, game one of said series (televised on NBC) seen by 2.374 viewers total, and game seven of the Lightning/Capitals Eastern Conference final pulling a 2.14 overnight rating—the highest viewership for a non-overtime game seven since 2015, and the highest cable viewership of the 2018 playoffs to-date. The Jets also contributed to strong viewership numbers in Canada, with Sportsnet reporting an average of 2.2 million across their second-round series.

Preceded by 2017 Stanley Cup playoffs	Stanley Cup playoffs 2018	Succeeded by 2019 Stanley Cup playoffs
