= 2023–24 NHL suspensions and fines =

The following is a list of all suspensions and fines enforced in the National Hockey League (NHL) during the 2023–24 NHL season. It lists which players or coaches of what team have been punished for which offense and the amount of punishment they have received.

Players' money forfeited due to suspension or fine goes to the Players' Emergency Assistance Fund, while money forfeited by coaches, staff or organizations as a whole goes to the NHL Foundation.

== Suspensions ==
Based on each player's average annual salary, divided by number of days in the season (192) for non-repeat offenders and games (82) for repeat offenders, salary will be forfeited for their suspension.

^{†} - suspension covered at least one 2023 NHL preseason game
^{‡} - suspension covered at least one 2024 postseason game
^{R} - player was considered a repeat offender under the terms of the Collective Bargaining Agreement (player had been suspended in the 18 months before this suspension)

Date of incident	Offender	Team	Offense	Date of action	Length	Salary forfeited^{1}^{,}^{2}
October 3, 2023	Arthur Kaliyev	Los Angeles Kings	Kneeing Chase De Leo.	October 5, 2023	4 games^{†} (2 preseason + 2 regular season)	$9,314.24
October 10, 2023	Brett Howden	Vegas Golden Knights	Illegal check to the head of Brandon Tanev.	October 11, 2023	2 games	$19,791.67
October 20, 2023	Rasmus Andersson	Calgary Flames	Charging Patrik Laine.	October 21, 2023	4 games^{3}	$94,791.67
Unknown	Shane Pinto	Ottawa Senators	Activities relating to sports wagering.	October 26, 2023	41 games^{4}	N/A^{4}
October 27, 2023	Connor Clifton	Buffalo Sabres	Illegal check to the head of Nico Hischier.	October 28, 2023	2 games	$34,722.22
October 30, 2023	Charlie McAvoy	Boston Bruins	Illegal check to the head of Oliver Ekman-Larsson.	October 31, 2023	4 games^{5}	$197,916.67
November 4, 2023	Andrew Mangiapane	Calgary Flames	Cross-checking Jared McCann.	November 5, 2023	1 game	$30,208.33
November 26, 2023	Ryan Hartman^{R}	Minnesota Wild	Tripping Alex DeBrincat.	November 27, 2023	2 games	$41,463.41
November 30, 2023	Brendan Smith	New Jersey Devils	Slashing Travis Konecny.	December 1, 2023	2 games	$11,458.33
December 9, 2023	David Perron	Detroit Red Wings	Cross-checking Artem Zub.	December 11, 2023	6 games^{6}	$148,437.48
December 10, 2023	Erik Gudbranson	Columbus Blue Jackets	Serving as the aggressor in an altercation with Nick Cousins.	December 11, 2023	1 game	$20,833.33
January 2, 2024	Jason Zucker	Arizona Coyotes	Boarding Nick Cousins.	January 3, 2024	3 games	$82,182.50
January 18, 2024	Yanni Gourde	Seattle Kraken	Charging Mattias Ekholm.	January 19, 2024	2 games	$53,819.44
January 19, 2024	Will Lockwood	Florida Panthers	Goaltender interference against Marc-Andre Fleury.	January 20, 2024	3 games	$12,109.38
January 25, 2024	Brendan Gallagher	Montreal Canadiens	Illegal check to the head of Adam Pelech.	January 26, 2024	5 games	$169,270.83
January 26, 2024	Jacob Trouba	New York Rangers	Elbowing Pavel Dorofeyev.	January 27, 2024	2 games	$83,333.33
February 6, 2024	Brenden Dillon	Winnipeg Jets	Illegal check to the head of Noel Acciari.	February 7, 2024	3 games	$60,937.50
February 10, 2024	Nikita Zadorov	Vancouver Canucks	Illegal check to the head of Lucas Raymond.	February 10, 2024	2 games	$39,062.50
February 10, 2024	Morgan Rielly	Toronto Maple Leafs	Cross-checking Ridly Greig.	February 13, 2024	5 games^{7}	$195,312.50
March 4, 2024	Martin Pospisil	Calgary Flames	Boarding Vince Dunn.	March 6, 2024	3 games	$12,109.38
March 7, 2024	Parker Kelly	Ottawa Senators	Illegal check to the head of Andreas Englund.	March 8, 2024	2 games	$7,942.71
March 9, 2024	John Tortorella (head coach)	Philadelphia Flyers	Failure to leave the bench area after being assessed a game misconduct for unprofessional conduct directed at officials during a game against the Tampa Bay Lightning.	March 10, 2024	2 games	$50,000.00^{8}
March 12, 2024	Matt Rempe	New York Rangers	Elbowing Jonas Siegenthaler.	March 13, 2024	4 games	$17,083.33
March 16, 2024	Dmitry Kulikov	Florida Panthers	Illegal check to the head of Conor Sheary.	March 18, 2024	2 games	$10,416.67
March 20, 2024	Tom Wilson	Washington Capitals	High-sticking Noah Gregor.	March 22, 2024	6 games	$161,458.34
March 28, 2024	Kaiden Guhle	Montreal Canadiens	Slashing Travis Konecny.	March 29, 2024	1 game	$4,496.53
March 30, 2024	Ryan Hartman^{R}	Minnesota Wild	Unsportsmanlike conduct towards the officials.	April 1, 2024	3 games	$62,195.12
May 12, 2024	Carson Soucy	Vancouver Canucks	Cross-checking Connor McDavid.	May 13, 2024	1 game^{‡}	N/A
May 13, 2024	Valeri Nichushkin	Colorado Avalanche	Violating the terms of the NHL/NHLPA Player Assistance Program.^{9}	May 13, 2024	26 games^{‡} (6 months; 3 postseason^{10} + 6 2024 preseason + 17 2024–25 regular-season)	N/A
Player totals:					121 games^{†‡} (2 preseason + 115 regular + 4 postseason)	$1,630,667.41

=== Notes ===
1. All figures are in US dollars.
2. As players are not paid salary in the preseason or postseason, no fines are generated for games lost due to suspension during those periods.
3. Andersson and the NHLPA appealed the suspension on October 22, 2023. After a hearing conducted on October 23, Commissioner Gary Bettman upheld the original four-game suspension. As his suspension was less than 6 games, per the Collective Bargaining Agreement, the Commissioner's decision was final and binding, not subject to review, and the NHLPA cannot appeal further to a neutral arbitrator on Andersson's behalf.
4. Pinto's suspension began retroactively with Ottawa's first game of the 2023–24 NHL season. As Pinto was a restricted free agent and not under contract at the time of the suspension, no salary was forfeited.
5. McAvoy and the NHLPA appealed the suspension on November 3, 2023. After a hearing conducted on November 7, Commissioner Bettman upheld the original four-game suspension. As his suspension was less than 6 games, per the Collective Bargaining Agreement, the Commissioner's decision was final and binding, not subject to review, and the NHLPA cannot appeal further to a neutral arbitrator on McAvoy's behalf.
6. Perron and the NHLPA appealed the suspension on December 12, 2023. After a hearing conducted on December 19, Commissioner Bettman upheld the original six-game suspension.
7. Rielly and the NHLPA appealed the suspension on February 14, 2024. After a hearing conducted on February 16, Commissioner Bettman upheld the original five-game suspension. As his suspension was less than 6 games, per the Collective Bargaining Agreement, the Commissioner's decision was final and binding, not subject to review, and the NHLPA cannot appeal further to a neutral arbitrator on Rielly's behalf.
8. Tortorella was fined a set $50,000 and the total was not calculated based on his annual salary.
9. Suspension accompanied by mandatory referral to Stage 3 of the NHL/NHLPA Player Assistance Program. Under the terms of the program, Nichushkin was assessed an automatic suspension of a minimum of six months without pay before being eligible for reinstatement, barring successful completion of the program. Nichushkin was previously placed in the Player Assistance Program on January 15, 2024, and was cleared by the NHL and NHLPA on February 26 when he entered the follow-up care phase of the program.
10. Under the aforementioned suspension, Nichushkin missed three Avalanche playoff games, before they were eliminated in the second round.

== Fines ==
Players can be fined up to 50% of one day's salary, up to a maximum of $10,000.00 for their first offense, and $15,000.00 for any subsequent offenses (the player had been fined in the 12 months before this fine). Coaches, non-playing personnel, and teams are not restricted to such maximums, though they can still be treated as repeat offenders.

Fines for players/coaches fined for diving/embellishment are structured uniquely and are only handed out after non-publicized warnings are given to the player/coach for their first offense. For more details on diving/embellishment fines:

Diving/embellishment specifications
Incident Number^{1}	Player Fine^{2}	Coach Fine^{2}
1	Warning (N/A)	Warning (N/A)
2	$2,000	N/A
3	$3,000	N/A
4	$4,000	N/A
5	$5,000	$2,000
6	$5,000	$3,000
7	$5,000	$4,000
8+	$5,000	$5,000

1. For coach incident totals, each citation issued to a player on his club counts toward his total.
2. All figures are in US dollars.

Fines listed in italics indicate that was the maximum allowed fine.
^{R} - player was considered a repeat offender under the terms of the Collective Bargaining Agreement (player had been fined in the 12 months before this fine) ^{#} - fine was reduced on appeal

Date of incident	Offender	Team	Offense	Date of action	Amount^{1}
October 11, 2023	Phillip Danault	Los Angeles Kings	Slashing Ross Colton.	October 12, 2023	$5,000.00
October 12, 2023	Garnet Hathaway^{R}	Philadelphia Flyers	Kneeing Zach Werenski.	October 13, 2023	$5,000.00
July 28, 2021	Team	Ottawa Senators	Failure to disclose details about a player contract.	November 1, 2023	1st-round pick^{2}^{#} $1,000,000.00+^{3}
October 30, 2023	Greg Cronin (head coach)	Anaheim Ducks	Unprofessional conduct towards officials.	November 3, 2023	$25,000.00
November 4, 2023	Mathew Barzal	New York Islanders	High-sticking Tony DeAngelo.	November 5, 2023	$5,000.00
November 7, 2023	Ross Colton	Colorado Avalanche	Cross-checking Timo Meier.	November 8, 2023	$5,000.00
November 13, 2023	Leon Draisaitl	Edmonton Oilers	Dangerous trip against Bo Horvat.	November 14, 2023	$5,000.00
November 15, 2023	Adam Erne	Edmonton Oilers	Elbowing Pierre-Edouard Bellemare.	November 16, 2023	$2,018.23
November 20, 2023	Nils Hoglander	Vancouver Canucks	Slew-footing Kevin Labanc.	November 21, 2023	$2,864.58
November 25, 2023	Jacob Trouba	New York Rangers	High-sticking Trent Frederic.	November 25, 2023	$5,000.00
November 27, 2023	Zack MacEwen	Ottawa Senators	Unsportsmanlike conduct against Matthew Tkachuk.	November 28, 2023	$2,018.23
November 30, 2023	Travis Konecny	Philadelphia Flyers	Cross-checking Brendan Smith.	December 1, 2023	$5,000.00
December 5, 2023	Jake Walman	Detroit Red Wings	High-sticking Jeff Skinner.	December 6, 2023	$2,500.00
December 7, 2023	Brendan Smith	New Jersey Devils	Dangerous trip against Devin Shore.	December 8, 2023	$2,864.58
December 7, 2023	Austin Watson^{R}	Tampa Bay Lightning	Unsportsmanlike conduct against Jeremy Lauzon.	December 8, 2023	$2,022.57
December 31, 2023	Ryan Hartman^{R}	Minnesota Wild	High-sticking Cole Perfetti.	January 2, 2024	$4,427.08
January 18, 2024	Liam O'Brien	Arizona Coyotes	Roughing Sam Lafferty.	January 19, 2024	$2,018.23
January 21, 2024	Conor Timmins	Toronto Maple Leafs	Cross-checking Brandon Tanev.	January 22, 2024	$2,864.58
January 25, 2024	Michael Kesselring	Arizona Coyotes	Cross-checking Max Crozier.	January 26, 2024	$2,408.85
January 27, 2024	Tyler Myers	Vancouver Canucks	Elbowing Sean Kuraly.	January 28, 2024	$5,000.00
February 7, 2024	Mason Marchment	Dallas Stars	Interference against Jake McCabe.	February 8, 2024	$5,000.00
February 10, 2024	Matt Grzelcyk	Boston Bruins	Spearing Max Pacioretty.	February 11, 2024	$5,000.00
February 13, 2024	Linus Ullmark	Boston Bruins	High-sticking Mikey Eyssimont.	February 14, 2024	$5,000.00
February 15, 2024	Nils Hoglander^{R}	Vancouver Canucks	High-sticking Jake Walman.	February 16, 2024	$2,864.58
February 17, 2024	Jordan Binnington	St. Louis Blues	High-sticking Luke Evangelista.	February 18, 2024	$5,000.00
February 20, 2024	Ryan Lomberg	Florida Panthers	Elbowing Jakob Chychrun.	February 21, 2024	$2,083.33
February 24, 2024	Jesperi Kotkaniemi	Carolina Hurricanes	Elbowing Joel Hanley.	February 25, 2024	$5,000.00
February 27, 2024	Don Granato (head coach)	Buffalo Sabres	Unprofessional conduct towards officials.	February 29, 2024	$25,000.00
February 27, 2024	Sheldon Keefe (head coach)	Toronto Maple Leafs	Unprofessional conduct towards officials.	February 29, 2024	$25,000.00
February 29, 2024	Michael McCarron	Nashville Predators	Unsportsmanlike conduct against Mats Zuccarello.	March 1, 2024	$2,000.00
February 29, 2024	Mats Zuccarello	Minnesota Wild	Unsportsmanlike conduct against Michael McCarron.	March 1, 2024	$2,000.00
February 27, 2024	Nick Cousins	Florida Panthers	Diving/embellishment (second citation).^{4}	March 7, 2024	$2,000.00
February 28, 2024	Oskar Sundqvist	St. Louis Blues	Diving/embellishment (second citation).^{5}	March 7, 2024	$2,000.00
March 7, 2024	Charlie Coyle	Boston Bruins	Cross-checking Tyler Bertuzzi.	March 8, 2024	$5,000.00
March 7, 2024	Evander Kane	Edmonton Oilers	Unsportsmanlike conduct against Cole Sillinger.	March 8, 2024	$2,500.00
March 7, 2024	Jake McCabe	Toronto Maple Leafs	Cross-checking Brad Marchand.	March 8, 2024	$5,000.00
March 27, 2024	Bowen Byram	Buffalo Sabres	Interference against Angus Crookshank.	March 28, 2024	$5,000.00
March 28, 2024	Ryan Strome^{R}	Anaheim Ducks	Cross-checking Tye Kartye.	March 29, 2024	$5,000.00
March 23, 2024	Garnet Hathaway	Philadelphia Flyers	Diving/embellishment (second citation).^{6}	March 29, 2024	$2,000.00
April 6, 2024	Evander Kane^{R}	Edmonton Oilers	Slashing Dryden Hunt.	April 7, 2024	$5,000.00
April 13, 2024	Kevin Shattenkirk	Boston Bruins	Unsportsmanlike conduct against Michael Bunting.	April 14, 2024	$2,734.38
April 26, 2024	Michael McCarron^{R}	Nashville Predators	Goaltender interference against Casey DeSmith.	April 27, 2024	$2,000.00
May 12, 2024	Nikita Zadorov	Vancouver Canucks	Cross-checking Connor McDavid.	May 13, 2024	$5,000.00
May 26, 2024	Jacob Trouba^{R}	New York Rangers	Elbowing Evan Rodrigues.	May 27, 2024	$5,000.00
Totals:					$223,189.22

=== Notes ===
1. All figures are in US dollars.
2. Instead of a cash fine, Ottawa will forfeit its first-round draft pick in one of the 2024, 2025, or 2026 NHL Entry Drafts. Ottawa will make the determination as to which pick will be forfeited within 24 hours of the conclusion of the Draft Lottery for that year.
3. On March 12, 2026, after Ottawa elected to use both of their 2024 and 2025 first-round draft picks, the NHL decided to modify the fine imposed on Ottawa, reinstating their 2026 first-round draft pick (relegated to the last pick in the first-round regardless of their results in the standings and unable to be involved in any trades). Ottawa was also made to pay $1,000,000 as part of the new ruling.
4. Cousins was issued his first citation following an incident on November 4, 2023.
5. Sundqvist was issued his first citation following an incident on February 11, 2024.
6. Hathaway was issued his first citation following an incident on January 2, 2024.

== See also ==
- 2022–23 NHL suspensions and fines
- 2024–25 NHL suspensions and fines
- 2023 in sports
- 2024 in sports
- 2023–24 NHL season
- 2023–24 NHL transactions
