= 2025–26 NHL suspensions and fines =

The following is a list of all suspensions and fines enforced in the National Hockey League (NHL) during the 2025–26 NHL season. It lists which players or coaches of what team have been punished for which offense and the amount of punishment they have received.

Players' money forfeited due to suspension or fine goes to the Players' Emergency Assistance Fund, while money forfeited by coaches, staff or organizations as a whole goes to the NHL Foundation.

== Suspensions ==
Based on each player's average annual salary, divided by number of days in the season (192) for non-repeat offenders and games (82) for repeat offenders, salary will be forfeited for the term of their suspension.

^{†} - suspension covered at least one 2025 NHL preseason game
^{‡} - suspension covered at least one 2026 postseason game

Date of incident	Offender	Team(s)	Offense(s)	Date of action	Length	Salary forfeited^{1}
June 19, 2018	Dillon Dube	No team	Unacceptable off-ice conduct.^{4}^{,}^{6}^{,}	September 11, 2025	N/A^{5}	N/A
June 19, 2018	Cal Foote	No team	Unacceptable off-ice conduct.^{4}^{,}^{7}^{,}	September 11, 2025	N/A^{5}	N/A
June 19, 2018	Alex Formenton	Ottawa Senators	Unacceptable off-ice conduct.^{4}^{,}^{8}^{,}	September 11, 2025	31 games^{†} (6 preseason + 25 regular season)	N/A
June 19, 2018	Carter Hart	No team / Vegas Golden Knights^{9}	Unacceptable off-ice conduct.^{4}^{,}^{9}^{,}	September 11, 2025	18 games	$395,833.33^{2}
June 19, 2018	Michael McLeod	No team	Unacceptable off-ice conduct.^{4}^{,}^{10}^{,}	September 11, 2025	N/A^{5}	N/A
October 4, 2025	Scott Sabourin	Tampa Bay Lightning	Roughing Aaron Ekblad.	October 6, 2025	4 games	$16,145.83
October 4, 2025	JJ Moser	Tampa Bay Lightning	Boarding Jesper Boqvist.	October 6, 2025	2 games	$35,156.25
October 9, 2025	Jonathan Drouin	New York Islanders	Cross-checking Connor Dewar.	October 10, 2025	1 game	$20,833.33
July 2025	Mitch Love (assistant coach)	Washington Capitals	Following the findings of an NHL-led investigation into past allegations, initiated in July 2025.^{11}^{,}	October 26, 2025	Remainder of the season^{‡} (73 regular season)	N/A
November 22, 2025	Mikko Rantanen	Dallas Stars	Boarding Matt Coronato; automatic suspension for receiving two game misconduct penalties in the physical infractions category before playing 41 consecutive games.^{12}^{,}	November 23, 2025	1 game	$62,500.00
December 8, 2025	Bobby McMann	Toronto Maple Leafs	High-sticking Oliver Bjorkstrand.	December 9, 2025	1 game	$7,031.25
January 3, 2026	John Beecher	Calgary Flames	Roughing Michael McCarron.	January 4, 2026	1 game	$4,687.50
January 3, 2026	Logan Stanley	Winnipeg Jets	Roughing Brady Tkachuk.	January 4, 2026	1 game	$6,510.42
January 25, 2026	Bryan Rust	Pittsburgh Penguins	Illegal check to the head of Brock Boeser.	January 27, 2026	3 games	$80,078.13
February 4, 2026	Caleb Jones	Pittsburgh Penguins	Violating the terms of the NHL/NHLPA Player Assistance Program.^{13}	February 4, 2026	20 games	$262,500.00^{2}
March 5, 2026	Evgeni Malkin	Pittsburgh Penguins	Slashing Rasmus Dahlin.	March 6, 2026	5 games	$158,854.17
March 12, 2026	Radko Gudas	Anaheim Ducks	Kneeing Auston Matthews.	March 13, 2026	5 games	$104,166.67
March 20, 2026	AJ Greer	Florida Panthers	Boarding Connor Zary.	March 22, 2026	3 games	$13,281.25
April 25, 2026	Ridly Greig	Ottawa Senators	Roughing Sean Walker.	May 4, 2026	2 games^{14}	$33,854.17
May 1, 2026	Charlie McAvoy	Boston Bruins	Slashing Zach Benson.	May 12, 2026	6 games^{15}	$296,875.00
May 12, 2026	Brayden McNabb	Vegas Golden Knights	Interference against Ryan Poehling.	May 13, 2026	1 game^{‡} (1 postseason)	N/A^{3}
Player totals:					168 games^{†} (6 preseason + 161 regular + 1 postseason)	$1,167,578.13

=== Notes ===
1. All figures are in US dollars.
2. Fines generated for games lost due to suspension for off-ice conduct are calculated uniquely and irrespective of repeat offender status.
3. As players are not paid salary in the preseason or postseason, no fines are generated for games lost due to suspension during those periods.
4. On September 11, 2025, the NHL determined that Dube, Foote, Formenton, Hart, and McLeod, while not under contract at the time of the suspension, would be eligible to sign an NHL contract no sooner than October 15, 2025, and eligible to play in NHL games no sooner than December 1, 2025.
5. Dube, Foote, and McLeod did not sign with an NHL team by December 1, and therefore missed no games during their suspension.
6. Dube took an indefinite leave of absence from the Calgary Flames on January 21, 2024. He missed 36 games and was released as an unrestricted free agent by the team at the end of the season; Dube sat out the entirety of the 2024–25 NHL season, for a total of 118 regular season games before the NHL's formal suspension.
7. Foote took an indefinite leave of absence from the New Jersey Devils on January 24, 2024. He missed 37 games and was released as an unrestricted free agent by the team at the end of the season; Foote sat out the entirety of the 2024–25 NHL season, for a total of 119 regular season games before the NHL's formal suspension.
8. Unable to comes to terms on a new contract with the Ottawa Senators for the 2022–23 NHL season, Formenton signed as a restricted free agent with HC Ambri-Piotta of the National League. He has not played in the NHL since April 2022, though remains on the Senators' reserve list.
9. Hart took an indefinite leave of absence from the Philadelphia Flyers on January 24, 2024. He missed 34 games and was released as an unrestricted free agent by the team at the end of the season; Hart sat out the entirety of the 2024–25 NHL season, for a total of 116 games before the NHL's formal suspension. Hart signed with the Vegas Golden Knights on October 24, 2025, a month and a half after the suspension was issued. The Golden Knights had 18 games remaining before Hart could play again, at the time of the signing.
10. McLeod took an indefinite leave of absence from the New Jersey Devils on January 24, 2024. He missed 37 games and was released as an unrestricted free agent by the team at the end of the season; McLeod sat out the entirety of the 2024–25 NHL season, for a total of 119 regular season games before the NHL's formal suspension.
11. Love had previously been put on team-imposed leave by the Washington Capitals on September 14, 2025, pending an investigation into allegations of past personal conduct. The Capitals relieved Love of his duties as assistant coach the same day the NHL concluded their investigations, after learning of the results.
12. Rantanen's first game misconduct penalty came as a result of boarding Alexander Romanov on November 18, 2025.
13. Suspension accompanied by mandatory referral to the NHL/NHLPA Program for Substance Abuse and Behavioral Health for evaluation and possible treatment.
14. As the Ottawa Senators were eliminated from the 2026 Stanley Cup playoffs, Greig's suspended games were deferred to the 2026–27 NHL season.
15. As the Boston Bruins were eliminated from the 2026 Stanley Cup playoffs, McAvoy's suspended games were deferred to the 2026–27 NHL season.

== Fines ==
Players can be fined up to 50% of one day's salary, up to a maximum of $10,000.00 for their first offense, and $15,000.00 for any subsequent offenses (player had been fined in the 12 months prior to this fine). Coaches, non-playing personnel, and teams are not restricted to such maximums, though can still be treated as repeat offenders.

Fines for players/coaches fined for diving/embellishment are structured uniquely and are only handed out after non-publicized warnings are given to the player/coach for their first offense. For more details on diving/embellishment fines:

Diving/embellishment specifications
Incident Number^{1}	Player Fine^{2}	Coach Fine^{2}
1	Warning (N/A)	Warning (N/A)
2	$2,000	N/A
3	$3,000	N/A
4	$4,000	N/A
5	$5,000	$2,000
6	$5,000	$3,000
7	$5,000	$4,000
8+	$5,000	$5,000

1. For coach incident totals, each citation issued to a player on his club counts toward his total.
2. All figures are in US dollars.

Fines listed in italics indicate that was the maximum allowed fine.
^{R} - Player was considered a repeat offender under the terms of the Collective Bargaining Agreement (player had been fined in the 12 months prior to this fine)

Date of incident	Offender	Team	Offense	Date of action	Amount^{1}
September 30, 2025	Nick Cousins^{R}	Ottawa Senators	Slashing Ivan Demidov.	October 1, 2025	$2,148.44
September 30, 2025	Hayden Hodgson	Ottawa Senators	Boarding Alex Newhook.	October 1, 2025	$2,018.23
October 2, 2025	AJ Greer	Florida Panthers	Roughing Brandon Hagel.	October 3, 2025	$2,213.54
October 4, 2025	Roman Schmidt	Tampa Bay Lightning	Cross-checking Carter Verhaeghe.	October 5, 2025	$2,098.52
October 4, 2025	Gage Goncalves	Tampa Bay Lightning	Cross-checking Evan Rodrigues.	October 5, 2025	$3,125.00
October 4, 2025	Team	Tampa Bay Lightning	Actions culminating in the events of a preseason game against the Florida Panthers.^{2}	October 6, 2025	$100,000.00
October 4, 2025	Jon Cooper (head coach)	Tampa Bay Lightning	Actions culminating in the events of a preseason game against the Florida Panthers.^{2}	October 6, 2025	$25,000.00
October 11, 2025	Ian Cole	Utah Mammoth	Dangerous trip against Steven Stamkos.	October 12, 2025	$2,500.00
October 11, 2025	Tyler Myers	Vancouver Canucks	Slashing Connor McDavid.	October 12, 2025	$2,500.00
October 16, 2025	Jackson Blake	Carolina Hurricanes	Slashing Jacob Trouba.	October 17, 2025	$2,358.94
October 18, 2025	Brad Marchand	Florida Panthers	Unsportsmanlike conduct against Rasmus Dahlin.	October 18, 2025	$5,000.00
November 1, 2025	Evgeni Malkin^{R}	Pittsburgh Penguins	Slashing Logan Stanley.	November 2, 2025	$5,000.00
November 12, 2025	Brenden Dillon	New Jersey Devils	Boarding Tyler Bertuzzi.	November 13, 2025	$5,000.00
November 11, 2025	Mikko Rantanen	Dallas Stars	Diving/embellishment (second citation).^{3}	November 21, 2025	$2,000.00
November 24, 2025	Ben Chiarot	Detroit Red Wings	Butt-ending Simon Nemec.	November 25, 2025	$5,000.00
December 19, 2025	Frank Vatrano	Anaheim Ducks	Unsportsmanlike conduct against Jason Robertson.	December 20, 2025	$5,000.00
December 20, 2025	Matt Grzelcyk	Chicago Blackhawks	Cross-checking Tim Stutzle.	December 21, 2025	$2,604.17
December 22, 2025	Ross Johnston	Anaheim Ducks	Roughing Tye Kartye.	December 23, 2025	$2,864.58
December 27, 2025	Anton Lundell	Florida Panthers	High-sticking Jake Guentzel.	December 28, 2025	$5,000.00
December 27, 2025	Scott Sabourin	Tampa Bay Lightning	Slashing Niko Mikkola.	December 28, 2025	$2,018.23
December 28, 2025	Mathew Barzal	New York Islanders	Slashing Mason Marchment.	December 29, 2025	$5,000.00
January 8, 2026	Anton Lundell^{R}	Florida Panthers	High-sticking Alexandre Texier.	January 9, 2026	$5,000.00
January 17, 2026	Steven Stamkos	Nashville Predators	Unsportsmanlike conduct against Jeremy Lauzon.	January 18, 2026	$2,500.00
January 25, 2026	William Nylander	Toronto Maple Leafs	Making an inappropriate gesture while in the press box during a Maple Leafs game.	January 26, 2026	$5,000.00
January 27, 2026	Brandon Duhaime	Washington Capitals	Unsportsmanlike conduct against Jacob Melanson.	January 28, 2026	$2,500.00
February 5, 2026	Michael McCarron	Nashville Predators	Slashing Trevor van Riemsdyk.	February 6, 2026	$2,343.75
February 5, 2026	Curtis Douglas	Tampa Bay Lightning	Serving as the aggressor in an altercation with Niko Mikkola.	February 6, 2026	$2,018.23
March 7, 2026	Bo Horvat	New York Islanders	Unsportsmanlike conduct against William Eklund.	March 8, 2026	$2,500.00
March 7, 2026	Tyler Kleven	Ottawa Senators	Cross-checking Jared McCann.	March 8, 2026	$4,166.67
March 8, 2026	Brandon Hagel	Tampa Bay Lightning	Serving as the aggressor in an altercation with Rasmus Dahlin.	March 9, 2026	$5,000.00
March 17, 2026	Seth Jarvis	Carolina Hurricanes	High-sticking Conor Garland.	March 18, 2026	$5,000.00
March 15, 2026	Beckett Sennecke	Anaheim Ducks	Diving/embellishment (second citation).^{4}	March 24, 2026	$2,000.00
April 2, 2026	Brady Tkachuk	Ottawa Senators	Unsportsmanlike conduct against Beck Malenstyn.	April 3, 2026	$2,500.00
April 5, 2026	Eetu Luostarinen	Florida Panthers	High-sticking Rickard Rakell.	April 6, 2026	$5,000.00
March 24, 2026	Matvei Michkov	Philadelphia Flyers	Diving/embellishment (second citation).^{5}	April 7, 2026	$2,000.00
April 7, 2026	Ryan Strome	Calgary Flames	Cross-checking Jason Robertson.	April 8, 2026	$5,000.00
April 19, 2026	Sean Durzi	Utah Mammoth	Head-butting Rasmus Andersson.	April 20, 2026	$5,000.00
April 26, 2026	Nikita Zadorov	Boston Bruins	Cross-checking Rasmus Dahlin.	April 27, 2026	$5,000.00
April 28, 2026	Jamie Benn^{R}	Dallas Stars	Cross-checking Ryan Hartman.	April 29, 2026	$2,604.17
April 30, 2026	Mikko Rantanen	Dallas Stars	Cross-checking Kirill Kaprizov.	May 1, 2026	$5,000.00
May 10, 2026	Beck Malenstyn	Buffalo Sabres	Goaltender interference against Jakub Dobes.	May 11, 2026	$3,515.63
May 10, 2026	Arber Xhekaj	Montreal Canadiens	Roughing Sam Carrick.	May 11, 2026	$3,385.42
May 14, 2026	Team	Vegas Golden Knights	Violating league media policies.	May 15, 2026	2nd-round pick^{6}
May 14, 2026	John Tortorella (head coach)	Vegas Golden Knights	Violating league media policies.	May 15, 2026	$100,000.00
Totals:					$365,483.52

=== Notes ===
1. All figures are in US dollars.
2. The game, which featured 65 penalties for 312 penalty minutes and 13 game misconduct penalties, saw two Lightning players suspended and a further two Lightning players fined in the aftermath.
3. Rantanen was issued his first citation following an incident on October 16, 2025.
4. Sennecke was issued his first citation following an incident on March 8, 2026.
5. Michkov was issued his first citation following an incident on December 3, 2025.
6. Instead of a cash fine, Vegas will forfeit its second-round draft pick in the 2026 NHL Entry Draft.

== See also ==
- 2024–25 NHL suspensions and fines
- 2026–27 NHL suspensions and fines
- 2025 in sports
- 2026 in sports
- 2025–26 NHL season
- 2025–26 NHL transactions
