= 2024–25 NHL suspensions and fines =

The following is a list of all suspensions and fines enforced in the National Hockey League (NHL) during the 2024–25 NHL season. It lists which players or coaches of what team have been punished for which offense and the amount of punishment they have received.

Players' money forfeited due to suspension or fine goes to the Players' Emergency Assistance Fund, while money forfeited by coaches, staff or organizations as a whole goes to the NHL Foundation.

== Suspensions ==
Based on each player's average annual salary, divided by number of days in the season (192) for non-repeat offenders and games (82) for repeat offenders, salary will be forfeited for the term of their suspension.

^{†} - suspension covered at least one 2024 NHL preseason game
^{#} - suspension was reduced on appeal
^{‡} - suspension covered at least one 2025 postseason game
^{R} - Player was considered a repeat offender under the terms of the Collective Bargaining Agreement (player had been suspended in the 18 months prior to this suspension)

Date of incident	Offender	Team(s)	Offense(s)	Date of action	Length	Salary forfeited^{1}
May 13, 2024	Valeri Nichushkin	Colorado Avalanche	Violating the terms of the NHL/NHLPA Player Assistance Program.^{4}	May 13, 2024	26 games^{†} (6 months; 3 2024 postseason^{5} + 6 preseason + 17 regular season)	$1,339,843.75^{2}
October 2, 2024	Conor Geekie	Tampa Bay Lightning	Leaving the bench on a legal line change for the purpose of starting an altercation with Josh Davies.	October 3, 2024	1 game^{†} (1 preseason)	N/A^{3}
October 30, 2024	Matt Stienburg	Colorado Avalanche	Charging Erik Cernak.	October 31, 2024	2 games	$9,361.98
November 7, 2024	Tanner Jeannot	Los Angeles Kings	Illegal check to the head of Brock Boeser.	November 8, 2024	3 games	$41,640.63
November 16, 2024	Ryan Reaves	Toronto Maple Leafs	Illegal check to the head of Darnell Nurse.	November 17, 2024	5 games	$35,156.25
November 25, 2024	Timo Meier	New Jersey Devils	Cross-checking Zachary L'Heureux.	November 26, 2024	1 game	$45,833.33
December 20, 2024	Matt Rempe^{R}	New York Rangers	Boarding and elbowing Miro Heiskanen.	December 22, 2024	8 games	$80,000.00
December 31, 2024	Zachary L'Heureux	Nashville Predators	Slew-footing Jared Spurgeon.	January 2, 2025	3 games	$13,489.59
January 16, 2025	Maxim Tsyplakov	New York Islanders	Illegal check to the head of Ryan Poehling.	January 17, 2025	3 games	$14,843.75
January 18, 2025	Connor McDavid	Edmonton Oilers	Cross-checking Conor Garland.	January 20, 2025	3 games	$195,312.50
January 18, 2025	Tyler Myers	Vancouver Canucks	Cross-checking Evan Bouchard.	January 20, 2025	3 games	$46,875.00
January 25, 2025	Emil Lilleberg	Tampa Bay Lightning	Interference against J.T. Compher.	January 27, 2025	2 games	$9,062.50
February 1, 2025	Ryan Hartman^{R}	Minnesota Wild	Roughing Tim Stutzle.	February 3, 2025; February 24, 2025	10 games^{#} 8 games^{6}	$487,804.88 $390,243.90
February 23, 2025	Trevor Zegras	Anaheim Ducks	Interference against Michael Rasmussen.	February 24, 2025	3 games	$89,843.75
March 10, 2025	Aaron Ekblad	Florida Panthers	Violating the terms of the NHL/NHLPA Performance Enhancing Substances Program.^{7}	March 10, 2025	20 games^{‡} (18 regular season + 2 postseason)	$1,445,312.50^{2}
March 12, 2025	Connor Zary	Calgary Flames	Elbowing Elias Pettersson.	March 13, 2025	2 games	$8,993.06
April 13, 2025	Paul Cotter	New Jersey Devils	Illegal check to the head of Adam Pelech.	April 14, 2025	2 games	$8,072.92
April 14, 2025	Darnell Nurse	Edmonton Oilers	Cross-checking Quinton Byfield.	April 15, 2025	1 game	$48,177.08
April 15, 2025	Jesse Puljujarvi	Florida Panthers	Illegal check to the head of Mitchell Chaffee.	April 17, 2025	2 games^{‡} (2 postseason)	N/A^{3}
April 24, 2025	Brandon Hagel	Tampa Bay Lightning	Interference against Aleksander Barkov.	April 25, 2025	1 game^{‡} (1 postseason)	N/A^{3}
April 28, 2025	Aaron Ekblad	Florida Panthers	Elbowing Brandon Hagel.	April 29, 2025	2 games^{‡} (2 postseason)	N/A^{3}
May 11, 2025	Doug Cifu (minority owner)	Florida Panthers	Inappropriate posts on social media.	May 12, 2025	Indefinitely	N/A
Player totals:					98 games^{†‡} (7 preseason + 84 regular + 7 postseason)	$3,822,062.49

=== Notes ===
1. All figures are in US dollars.
2. Fines generated for games lost due to suspension for off-ice conduct are calculated uniquely and irrespective of repeat offender status.
3. As players are not paid salary in the preseason or postseason, no fines are generated for games lost due to suspension during those periods.
4. Suspension accompanied by mandatory referral to Stage 3 of the NHL/NHLPA Player Assistance Program. Under the terms of the program, Nichushkin was assessed an automatic suspension of a minimum of six months without pay before being eligible for reinstatement, barring successful completion of the program. Nichushkin was previously placed in the Player Assistance Program on January 15, 2024, and was cleared by the NHL and NHLPA on February 26 when he entered the follow-up care phase of the program.
5. Under the aforementioned suspension, Nichushkin missed three Avalanche playoff games, before they were eliminated in the second round.
6. Hartman and the NHLPA appealed the suspension on February 5, 2025. On February 24, 2025, NHL Commissioner Gary Bettman announced he had heard the appeal and was reducing the suspension to eight games.
7. Suspension accompanied by mandatory referral to the NHL/NHLPA Program for Substance Abuse and Behavioral Health for evaluation and possible treatment.

== Fines ==
Players can be fined up to 50% of one day's salary, up to a maximum of $10,000.00 for their first offense, and $15,000.00 for any subsequent offenses (player had been fined in the 12 months prior to this fine). Coaches, non-playing personnel, and teams are not restricted to such maximums, though can still be treated as repeat offenders.

Fines for players/coaches fined for diving/embellishment are structured uniquely and are only handed out after non-publicized warnings are given to the player/coach for their first offense. For more details on diving/embellishment fines:

Diving/embellishment specifications
Incident Number^{1}	Player Fine^{2}	Coach Fine^{2}
1	Warning (N/A)	Warning (N/A)
2	$2,000	N/A
3	$3,000	N/A
4	$4,000	N/A
5	$5,000	$2,000
6	$5,000	$3,000
7	$5,000	$4,000
8+	$5,000	$5,000

1. For coach incident totals, each citation issued to a player on his club counts toward his total.
2. All figures are in US dollars.

Fines listed in italics indicate that was the maximum allowed fine.
^{R} - Player was considered a repeat offender under the terms of the Collective Bargaining Agreement (player had been fined in the 12 months prior to this fine)

Date of incident	Offender	Team	Offense	Date of action	Amount^{1}
September 28, 2024	Arber Xhekaj	Montreal Canadiens	Unsportsmanlike conduct against Cedric Pare.	September 29, 2024	$3,385.42
October 21, 2024	Oliver Ekman-Larsson	Toronto Maple Leafs	Interference against Jake Guentzel.	October 22, 2024	$5,000.00
October 26, 2024	Garnet Hathaway	Philadelphia Flyers	Elbowing Joel Eriksson Ek.	October 27, 2024	$5,000.00
October 28, 2024	Rasmus Dahlin	Buffalo Sabres	High-sticking Anton Lundell.	October 29, 2024	$5,000.00
November 16, 2024	Neal Pionk	Winnipeg Jets	Clipping Jesper Boqvist.	November 17, 2024	$5,000.00
November 29, 2024	Nikita Zadorov^{R}	Boston Bruins	Unsportsmanlike conduct against Evgeni Malkin.	November 30, 2024	$5,000.00
November 29, 2024	Evgeni Malkin	Pittsburgh Penguins	Slashing Mason Lohrei.	November 30, 2024	$5,000.00
November 23, 2024	Jeff Skinner	Edmonton Oilers	Diving/embellishment (second citation).^{2}	December 2, 2024	$2,000.00
December 5, 2024	Josh Norris	Ottawa Senators	Diving/embellishment (second citation).^{3}	December 13, 2024	$2,000.00
December 14, 2024	Jonatan Berggren	Detroit Red Wings	Cross-checking Connor Dewar.	December 15, 2024	$2,148.44
December 14, 2024	Ryan Warsofsky (head coach)	San Jose Sharks	Unprofessional conduct towards officials.	December 17, 2024	$25,000.00
December 29, 2024	Patrick Maroon	Chicago Blackhawks	Elbowing Mavrik Bourque.	December 30, 2024	$3,385.42
December 29, 2024	Matvei Michkov	Philadelphia Flyers	High-sticking Quinton Byfield.	December 30, 2024	$2,473.96
December 26, 2024	Team	Dallas Stars	Violating the collective bargaining agreement between the NHL and the NHLPA.	December 30, 2024	$100,000.00
December 23, 2024	Dougie Hamilton	New Jersey Devils	Diving/embellishment (second citation).^{4}	January 3, 2025	$2,000.00
January 3, 2025	Sam Bennett	Florida Panthers	Roughing Drew O'Connor.	January 4, 2025	$5,000.00
January 5, 2025	Max Domi	Toronto Maple Leafs	Elbowing Garnet Hathaway.	January 6, 2025	$5,000.00
January 9, 2025	Nick Cousins	Ottawa Senators	Elbowing Jacob Bryson.	January 10, 2025	$2,083.33
January 13, 2025	Adrian Kempe	Los Angeles Kings	Slew-footing Connor McDavid.	January 14, 2025	$5,000.00
January 14, 2025	Johnathan Kovacevic	New Jersey Devils	Cross-checking Matthew Tkachuk.	January 15, 2025	$1,996.53
January 14, 2025	Jack McBain	Utah Hockey Club	High-sticking Brendan Gallagher.	January 15, 2025	$4,166.66
January 16, 2025	Scott Laughton	Philadelphia Flyers	Cross-checking Maxim Tsyplakov.	January 17, 2025	$5,000.00
January 18, 2025	Oskar Sundqvist	St. Louis Blues	Diving/embellishment (second citation).^{5}	January 24, 2025	$2,000.00
March 2, 2025	Sheldon Keefe (head coach)	New Jersey Devils	Unprofessional conduct towards officials.	March 5, 2025	$25,000.00
March 23, 2025	Zachary Bolduc	St. Louis Blues	Cross-checking Nick Blankenburg.	March 24, 2025	$2,248.26
March 26, 2025	Michael Callahan	Boston Bruins	Cross-checking Jansen Harkins.	March 27, 2025	$2,018.23
March 30, 2025	Niko Mikkola	Florida Panthers	Unsportsmanlike conduct.	March 31, 2025	$5,000.00
April 24, 2025	Nick Cousins^{R}	Ottawa Senators	Unsportsmanlike conduct against Anthony Stolarz during warmups prior to a playoff game against the Toronto Maple Leafs.	April 25, 2025	$2,083.33
April 24, 2025	Team	Ottawa Senators	Unsportsmanlike conduct during warmups prior to a playoff game against the Toronto Maple Leafs.	April 25, 2025	$25,000.00
April 25, 2025	Josh Anderson	Montreal Canadiens	Unsportsmanlike conduct against Tom Wilson.	April 26, 2025	$5,000.00
April 25, 2025	Tom Wilson	Washington Capitals	Unsportsmanlike conduct against Josh Anderson.	April 26, 2025	$5,000.00
April 27, 2025	Dylan McIlrath	Washington Capitals	Unsportsmanlike conduct during warmups prior to a playoff game against the Montreal Canadiens.	April 28, 2025	$2,018.23
April 27, 2025	Arber Xhekaj^{R}	Montreal Canadiens	Unsportsmanlike conduct during warmups prior to a playoff game against the Washington Capitals.	April 28, 2025	$3,385.42
April 27, 2025	Team	Montreal Canadiens	Unsportsmanlike conduct during warmups prior to a playoff game against the Washington Capitals.	April 28, 2025	$25,000.00
April 27, 2025	Team	Washington Capitals	Unsportsmanlike conduct during warmups prior to a playoff game against the Montreal Canadiens.	April 28, 2025	$25,000.00
April 28, 2025	Niko Mikkola^{R}	Florida Panthers	Boarding Zemgus Girgensons.	April 29, 2025	$5,000.00
May 8, 2025	Nicolas Roy	Vegas Golden Knights	Cross-checking Trent Frederic.	May 9, 2025	$7,812.50
May 11, 2025	Max Domi^{R}	Toronto Maple Leafs	Boarding Aleksander Barkov.	May 12, 2025	$5,000.00
May 15, 2025	Jamie Benn	Dallas Stars	Roughing Mark Scheifele.	May 16, 2025	$5,000.00
June 9, 2025	Jake Walman	Edmonton Oilers	Unsportsmanlike conduct.	June 10, 2025	$5,000.00
June 9, 2025	Jake Walman	Edmonton Oilers	Roughing Matthew Tkachuk.	June 10, 2025	$5,000.00
Totals:					$362,205.73

=== Notes ===
1. All figures are in US dollars.
2. Skinner was issued his first citation following an incident on October 22, 2024.
3. Norris was issued his first citation following an incident on November 7, 2024.
4. Hamilton was issued his first citation following an incident on November 4, 2024.
5. Sundqvist was issued his first citation following an incident on November 25, 2024.

== See also ==
- 2023–24 NHL suspensions and fines
- 2025–26 NHL suspensions and fines
- 2024 in sports
- 2025 in sports
- 2024–25 NHL season
- 2024–25 NHL transactions
