= 2026–27 NHL suspensions and fines =

The following is a list of all suspensions and fines enforced in the National Hockey League (NHL) during the 2026–27 NHL season. It lists which players or coaches of what team have been punished for which offense and the amount of punishment they have received.

Players' money forfeited due to suspension or fine goes to the Players' Emergency Assistance Fund, while money forfeited by coaches, staff or organizations as a whole goes to the NHL Foundation.

== Suspensions ==
Based on each player's average annual salary, divided by number of days in the season (194) for non-repeat offenders and games (84) for repeat offenders, salary will be forfeited for the term of their suspension.

Date of incident	Offender	Team(s)	Offense(s)	Date of action	Length	Salary forfeited^{1}
April 25, 2026	Ridly Greig	Ottawa Senators	Roughing Sean Walker.	May 4, 2026	2 games^{3}	N/A
May 1, 2026	Charlie McAvoy	Boston Bruins	Slashing Zach Benson.	May 12, 2026	6 games^{4}	N/A
October 8, 2026	Frank Nazar	Chicago Blackhawks	Illegal check to the head of Bo Horvat.	October 9, 2026	2 games	$68,041.14
October 29, 2026	Hayden Hodgson	Ottawa Senators	Boarding Brandt Clarke.	October 30, 2026	2 games	$8,762.88
Player totals:					12 games	$76,804.02

=== Notes ===
1. All figures are in US dollars.
2. Fines generated for games lost due to suspension for off-ice conduct are calculated uniquely and irrespective of repeat offender status.
3. As the Ottawa Senators were eliminated from the 2026 Stanley Cup playoffs, Greig's suspended games were deferred to the 2026–27 NHL season.
4. As the Boston Bruins were eliminated from the 2026 Stanley Cup playoffs, McAvoy's suspended games were deferred to the 2026–27 NHL season.

== Fines ==
Players can be fined up to 50% of one day's salary, up to a maximum of $15,000.00 for their first offense, and $20,000.00 for any subsequent offenses (player had been fined in the 12 months prior to this fine). Coaches, non-playing personnel, and teams are not restricted to such maximums, though can still be treated as repeat offenders.

Fines for players/coaches fined for diving/embellishment are structured uniquely and are only handed out after non-publicized warnings are given to the player/coach for their first offense. For more details on diving/embellishment fines:

Diving/embellishment specifications
Incident Number^{1}	Player Fine^{2}	Coach Fine^{2}
1	Warning (N/A)	Warning (N/A)
2	$2,000	N/A
3	$3,000	N/A
4	$4,000	N/A
5	$5,000	$2,000
6	$5,000	$3,000
7	$5,000	$4,000
8+	$5,000	$5,000

1. For coach incident totals, each citation issued to a player on his club counts toward his total.
2. All figures are in US dollars.

Fines listed in italics indicate that was the maximum allowed fine.
^{R} - Player was considered a repeat offender under the terms of the Collective Bargaining Agreement (player had been fined in the 12 months prior to this fine)

Date of incident	Offender	Team	Offense	Date of action	Amount^{1}
September 21, 2026	Andrew Cristall	Washington Capitals	Cross-checking Hunter McDonald.	September 22, 2026	$2,250.86
September 24, 2026	Ville Ottavainen	Seattle Kraken	Serving as the aggressor in an altercation with Brennan Othmann.	September 25, 2026	$2,190.72
September 26, 2026	Mike Matheson	Montreal Canadiens	Roughing Ridly Greig.	September 27, 2026	$5,000.00
October 10, 2026	Evan Rodrigues	New Jersey Devils	High-sticking Marco Rossi.	October 11, 2026	$5,000.00
October 13, 2026	Mathieu Olivier	Columbus Blue Jackets	Slashing Uvis Balinskis.	October 15, 2026	$5,000.00
October 21, 2026	Matthew Tkachuk	Florida Panthers	Roughing Dylan Cozens.	October 22, 2026	$5,000.00
October 21, 2026	Nick Cousins	Ottawa Senators	Unsportsmanlike conduct against Matthew Tkachuk.	October 22, 2026	$4,091.49
October 31, 2026	Nikita Zadorov^{R}	Boston Bruins	Roughing Alex Vlasic.	November 1, 2026	$5,000.00
November 7, 2026	Logan Stanley	New York Islanders	Slashing Nico Hischier.	November 8, 2026	$3,865.98
November 9, 2026	Mason Marchment	San Jose Sharks	Roughing Victor Eklund.	November 10, 2026	$5,000.00
November 14, 2026	Ryan Leonard	Washington Capitals	High-sticking Cody Glass.	November 15, 2026	$2,448.45
November 18, 2026	Parker Kelly	Colorado Avalanche	High-sticking Michael Carcone.	November 19, 2026	$3,500.00
November 18, 2026	Gabriel Landeskog	Colorado Avalanche	Cross-checking Logan Cooley.	November 19, 2026	$5,000.00
November 19, 2026	Adrian Kempe	Los Angeles Kings	High-sticking Dakota Joshua.	November 20, 2026	$3,500.00
Totals:					$56,847.50

=== Notes ===
1. All figures are in US dollars.

== See also ==
- 2025–26 NHL suspensions and fines
- 2026 in sports
- 2027 in sports
- 2026–27 NHL season
- 2026–27 NHL transactions
