= 2022–23 NHL suspensions and fines =

The following is a list of all suspensions and fines enforced in the National Hockey League (NHL) during the 2022–23 NHL season. It lists which players or coaches of what team have been punished for which offense and the amount of punishment they have received.

Players' money forfeited due to suspension or fine goes to the Players' Emergency Assistance Fund, while money forfeited by coaches, staff or organizations as a whole goes to the NHL Foundation.

== Suspensions ==
Based on each player's average annual salary, divided by number of days in the season (185) for non-repeat offenders and games (82) for repeat offenders, salary will be forfeited for the term of their suspension.

^{†} - suspension covered at least one 2022 NHL preseason game
^{‡} - suspension covered at least one 2023 postseason game
^{R} - Player was considered a repeat offender under the terms of the Collective Bargaining Agreement (player had been suspended in the 18 months prior to this suspension)

Date of incident	Offender	Team(s)	Offense(s)	Date of action	Length	Salary forfeited^{1}^{,}^{2}
September 26, 2022	Jacob Melanson	Seattle Kraken	Illegal check to the head of James Hamblin.	September 27, 2022	2 games^{†}	N/A
September 28, 2022	Jacob Doty	Los Angeles Kings	Interference against Jeffrey Viel.	September 30, 2022	2 games^{†}	N/A
October 17, 2022	Evgeny Kuznetsov	Washington Capitals	High-sticking Kyle Burroughs.	October 18, 2022	1 game	$42,162.16
October 27, 2022	Michael Rasmussen	Detroit Red Wings	High-sticking David Krejci.	October 28, 2022	2 games	$15,783.78
November 5, 2022	Matthew Tkachuk	Florida Panthers	High-sticking Jonathan Quick.	November 6, 2022	2 games	$102,702.70
November 5, 2022	Josh Anderson	Montreal Canadiens	Boarding Alex Pietrangelo.	November 6, 2022	2 games	$59,459.46
November 8, 2022	Juraj Slafkovsky	Montreal Canadiens	Boarding Matt Luff.	November 9, 2022	2 games	$10,270.28
November 11, 2022	Nicolas Aube-Kubel	Washington Capitals	Illegal check to the head of Cal Foote.	November 12, 2022	3 games	$16,216.23
December 8, 2022	Pierre Engvall	Toronto Maple Leafs	High-sticking Sean Durzi.	December 9, 2022	1 game	$12,162.16
December 9, 2022	Jeff Skinner	Buffalo Sabres	High-sticking Jake Guentzel.	December 10, 2022	3 games	$145,945.95
December 9, 2022	Jamie Oleksiak	Seattle Kraken	Illegal check to the head of Alexander Alexeyev.	December 10, 2022	3 games	$74,594.59
December 18, 2022	Tomas Hertl	San Jose Sharks	High-sticking Elias Lindholm.	December 19, 2022	2 games	$87,972.97
December 22, 2022	Mason Shaw	Minnesota Wild	Kneeing Evgeny Svechnikov.	December 23, 2022	2 games	$8,108.11
February 23, 2023	Erik Cernak	Tampa Bay Lightning	Elbowing Kyle Okposo.	February 24, 2023	2 games	$31,891.89
February 26, 2023	K'Andre Miller	New York Rangers	Unsportsmanlike conduct against Drew Doughty.	February 28, 2023	3 games	$15,000.00
March 7, 2023	Tony DeAngelo	Philadelphia Flyers	Spearing Corey Perry.	March 8, 2023	2 games	$54,054.05
March 15, 2023	Jordan Binnington	St. Louis Blues	Roughing and unsportsmanlike conduct against Ryan Hartman.	March 16, 2023	2 games	$64,864.86
March 23, 2023	A.J. Greer	Boston Bruins	Cross-checking Mike Hoffman.	March 24, 2023	1 game	$4,121.62
March 25, 2023	Blake Lizotte	Los Angeles Kings	Cross-checking Josh Morrissey.	March 26, 2023	1 game	$9,054.05
April 11, 2023	Ryan Hartman	Minnesota Wild	Interference against Nikolaj Ehlers.	April 12, 2023	1 game	$9,189.19
April 18, 2023	Michael Bunting	Toronto Maple Leafs	Illegal check to the head and interference against Erik Cernak.	April 19, 2023	3 games^{‡}	N/A
April 24, 2023	Cale Makar	Colorado Avalanche	Interference against Jared McCann.	April 25, 2023	1 game^{‡}	N/A
May 10, 2023	Darnell Nurse^{R}	Edmonton Oilers	Automatic suspension for instigating a fight against Nicolas Hague during the final five minutes of a game.	May 11, 2023	1 game^{‡}	N/A
May 10, 2023	Alex Pietrangelo	Vegas Golden Knights	Slashing Leon Draisaitl.	May 11, 2023	1 game^{‡}	N/A
May 23, 2023	Jamie Benn	Dallas Stars	Cross-checking Mark Stone.	May 24, 2023	2 games^{‡}	N/A
Player totals:					47 games^{†‡} (4 preseason + 35 regular season + 8 postseason)	$755,445.94

=== Notes ===
1. All figures are in US dollars.
2. As players are not paid salary in the preseason or postseason, no fines are generated for games lost due to suspension during those periods.

== Fines ==
Players can be fined up to 50% of one day's salary, up to a maximum of $10,000.00 for their first offense, and $15,000.00 for any subsequent offenses (player had been fined in the 12 months prior to this fine). Coaches, non-playing personnel, and teams are not restricted to such maximums, though can still be treated as repeat offenders.

Fines for players/coaches fined for diving/embellishment are structured uniquely and are only handed out after non-publicized warnings are given to the player/coach for their first offense. For more details on diving/embellishment fines:

Diving/embellishment specifications
Incident Number^{1}	Player Fine^{2}	Coach Fine^{2}
1	Warning (N/A)	Warning (N/A)
2	$2,000	N/A
3	$3,000	N/A
4	$4,000	N/A
5	$5,000	$2,000
6	$5,000	$3,000
7	$5,000	$4,000
8+	$5,000	$5,000

1. For coach incident totals, each citation issued to a player on his club counts toward his total.
2. All figures are in US dollars.

Fines listed in italics indicate that was the maximum allowed fine.
^{R} - Player was considered a repeat offender under the terms of the Collective Bargaining Agreement (player had been fined in the 12 months prior to this fine)

Date of incident	Offender	Team	Offense	Date of action	Amount^{1}
September 27, 2022	Jeff Petry	Pittsburgh Penguins	Roughing Jonatan Berggren.	September 28, 2022	$5,000.00
October 4, 2022	Michael Carcone	Arizona Coyotes	Roughing Gage Quinney.	October 5, 2022	$2,027.03
October 8, 2022	Alexander Romanov	New York Islanders	Charging Vincent Trocheck.	October 9, 2022	$5,000.00
October 12, 2022	Darnell Nurse	Edmonton Oilers	Interference against Kyle Burroughs.	October 13, 2022	$5,000.00
October 29, 2022	Ty Dellandrea	Dallas Stars	Interference against Igor Shesterkin.	October 30, 2022	$2,333.33
November 1, 2022	Casey Cizikas	New York Islanders	Interference against Alex Stalock.	November 2, 2022	$5,000.00
November 1, 2022	Trevor Zegras	Anaheim Ducks	Slashing Matt Benning.	November 2, 2022	$1,500.00
November 8, 2022	Kirill Kaprizov	Minnesota Wild	Roughing Drew Doughty.	November 9, 2022	$5,000.00
November 11, 2022	Garnet Hathaway	Washington Capitals	Unsportsmanlike conduct against Pat Maroon.	November 12, 2022	$4,054.05
November 11, 2022	Pat Maroon^{R}	Tampa Bay Lightning	Unsportsmanlike conduct against Garnet Hathaway.	November 12, 2022	$2,702.70
November 12, 2022	Blake Coleman	Calgary Flames	Slew-footing Pierre-Luc Dubois.	November 13, 2022	$5,000.00
November 13, 2022	Carson Soucy	Seattle Kraken	Roughing Pierre-Luc Dubois.	November 14, 2022	$2,500.00
November 14, 2022	Mathieu Joseph	Ottawa Senators	High-sticking Sebastian Aho.	November 15, 2022	$5,000.00
December 8, 2022	Mason Marchment	Dallas Stars	Diving/embellishment (second citation).^{2}	December 16, 2022	$2,000.00
December 17, 2022	Austin Watson	Ottawa Senators	Interference against Dylan Larkin.	December 18, 2022	$4,054.05
December 20, 2022	Mikhail Sergachev	Tampa Bay Lightning	Slashing Michael Bunting.	December 21, 2022	$5,000.00
December 27, 2022	Sheldon Keefe (head coach)	Toronto Maple Leafs	Demeaning conduct directed at the officials.	December 28, 2022	$25,000.00
December 26, 2022	Team	Toronto Maple Leafs	Violating the collective bargaining agreement between the NHL and the NHLPA.	December 28, 2022	$100,000.00
January 12, 2023	Clayton Keller	Arizona Coyotes	Cross-checking Erik Brannstrom.	January 13, 2023	$5,000.00
January 12, 2023	Mikhail Sergachev^{R}	Tampa Bay Lightning	Roughing Conor Garland.	January 13, 2023	$5,000.00
January 17, 2023	Paul Maurice (head coach)	Florida Panthers	Inappropriate comments against officials during a postgame press conference.	January 19, 2023	$25,000.00
January 19, 2023	Mike Matheson	Montreal Canadiens	Interference against Eric Staal.	January 20, 2023	$5,000.00
January 24, 2023	Juuso Valimaki	Arizona Coyotes	Slashing Max Jones.	January 25, 2023	$4,189.19
February 9, 2023	Ian Cole	Tampa Bay Lightning	Kneeing Andrew Cogliano.	February 10, 2023	$5,000.00
February 21, 2023	Dylan Larkin	Detroit Red Wings	Cross-checking T.J. Oshie.	February 22, 2023	$5,000.00
February 23, 2023	Brad Marchand^{R}	Boston Bruins	Dangerous trip against Oliver Bjorkstrand.	February 24, 2023	$5,000.00
February 27, 2023	Christian Wolanin	Vancouver Canucks	Slashing Ty Dellandrea.	February 28, 2023	$2,027.03
February 27, 2023	Colin Miller	Dallas Stars	Elbowing Nils Aman.	February 28, 2023	$5,000.00
March 7, 2023	Ryan Hartman^{R}	Minnesota Wild	Slashing Rasmus Andersson.	March 8, 2023	$4,594.59
March 11, 2023	John Tavares	Toronto Maple Leafs	Slashing Vincent Desharnais.	March 12, 2023	$5,000.00
March 16, 2023	Nick Suzuki	Montreal Canadiens	Cross-checking Anton Lundell.	March 17, 2023	$2,500.00
April 5, 2023	Adam Fox	New York Rangers	Slashing Corey Perry.	April 6, 2023	$5,000.00
April 5, 2023	Alex Killorn	Tampa Bay Lightning	Slashing Igor Shesterkin.	April 6, 2023	$5,000.00
April 2, 2023	Mark Friedman	Pittsburgh Penguins	Diving/embellishment (second citation).^{3}	April 6, 2023	$2,000.00
April 9, 2023	Ryan Strome	Anaheim Ducks	Unsportsmanlike conduct against the Colorado Avalanche.	April 10, 2023	$5,000.00
April 11, 2023	Neal Pionk	Winnipeg Jets	Cross-checking Marcus Johansson.	April 12, 2023	$5,000.00
April 22, 2023	Sam Lafferty	Toronto Maple Leafs	Cross-checking Ross Colton.	April 23, 2023	$3,108.11
April 23, 2023	Matthew Tkachuk	Florida Panthers	Cross-checking Garnet Hathaway.	April 24, 2023	$5,000.00
May 4, 2023	Sam Bennett	Florida Panthers	Cross-checking Michael Bunting.	May 5, 2023	$5,000.00
May 7, 2023	Tomas Tatar	New Jersey Devils	High-sticking Sebastian Aho.	May 8, 2023	$5,000.00
April 17, 2023	Team	Vancouver Canucks	Violating the collective bargaining agreement between the NHL and the NHLPA.	May 8, 2023	$50,000.00
May 10, 2023	Jay Woodcroft (head coach)	Edmonton Oilers	Automatic fine for Darnell Nurse instigating a fight during the final five minutes of a game.	May 11, 2023	$10,000.00
May 23, 2023	Max Domi	Dallas Stars	Slashing Mark Stone.	May 24, 2023	$5,000.00
Totals:					$369,590.08

=== Notes ===
1. All figures are in US dollars.
2. Marchment was issued his first citation following an incident on November 26, 2022.
3. Friedman was issued his first citation following an incident on December 28, 2022.

== See also ==
- 2021–22 NHL suspensions and fines
- 2023–24 NHL suspensions and fines
- 2022 in sports
- 2023 in sports
- 2022–23 NHL season
- 2022–23 NHL transactions
