= Arber Xhekaj =

Canadian ice hockey player (born 2001)

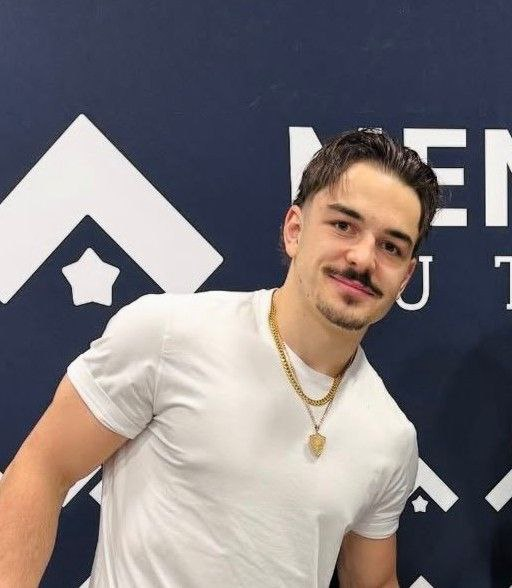
- Xhekaj in 2025
- Born: January 30, 2001 (age 25) Hamilton, Ontario, Canada
- Height: 6 ft 4 in (193 cm)
- Weight: 240 lb (109 kg; 17 st 2 lb)
- Position: Defence
- Shoots: Left
- NHL team: Montreal Canadiens
- NHL draft: Undrafted
- Playing career: 2022–present

Arber Xhekaj (Albanian: Arbër Xhekaj, pronounced ahr-bur, jek-EYE, born January 30, 2001) is a Canadian professional ice hockey player who is a defenceman for the Montreal Canadiens of the National Hockey League (NHL). Originally undrafted by teams in the NHL, he signed as an unrestricted free agent with Montreal in October 2021.

== Playing career ==
=== Amateur ===
While playing minor ice hockey with the Hamilton Huskies of Alliance Hockey, Xhekaj was known for having a comparatively slight frame, and, as a result, was not selected in the Ontario Hockey League (OHL) 2017 Priority Selection draft. He was one of two eligible players on his team who were not drafted, which he called "pretty tough." Despite contemplating ending his hockey career, he was encouraged to continue by his parents.

=== Junior ===
During his time with the St. Catharines Falcons of the Greater Ontario Junior Hockey League (GOJHL), Xhekaj drew the interest of the Kitchener Rangers scouting staff. Although not drafted in his second year of major junior eligibility, Xhekaj earned an invitation to the Rangers' training camp in 2018. He made the roster and played two seasons in the OHL before the COVID-19 pandemic cancelled the 2020–21 season.

Following non-selection in both the 2020 and 2021 NHL drafts, Xhekaj received a training camp invitation from the Montreal Canadiens before the 2021–22 NHL season. Xhekaj's performance impressed team management, and he signed a three-year, entry-level contract with the Canadiens on October 4, 2021, as an undrafted free agent.

Xhekaj remained with the Rangers at the beginning of the 2021–22 season, acquiring a reputation as a dangerous defenceman who was described by The Hockey News as having "effectively blended the old-school enforcer with the modern-day defensive blueliner." He was suspended twice in the fall, once for a slew foot and once for a gesture made after a fight. Amongst his teammates, he was known as "the Sheriff." Midway through the year, Xhekaj was traded to his hometown-based Hamilton Bulldogs. Joining a highly touted Bulldogs team, Xhekaj participated in their J. Ross Robertson Cup victory in the 2022 OHL playoffs and played in that year's Memorial Cup tournament where Hamilton advanced to the championship game before being defeated by host, the Saint John Sea Dogs. For his performance, Xhekaj was named to the Memorial Cup All-Star Team.

=== Professional ===
Initially considered more likely to earn a regular place on American Hockey League (AHL) affiliate, the Laval Rocket at the onset of his professional career, Xhekaj continued to distinguish himself across rookie tournament and preseason play. In the ensuing NHL preseason, his aggressive physical style attracted attention from opposing teams' fans, notably the Ottawa Senators. In response, he stated, "when their whole Sens Nation is talking about me, it's pretty good. I like being the bad guy."

With injuries to veteran defencemen Mike Matheson and Joel Edmundson, additional openings were created for rookies to make the Canadiens' lineup. On October 10, 2022, it was confirmed that Xhekaj had made their opening night roster ahead of the 2022–23 season. Upon making his NHL debut on October 12, Xhekaj became the first player in NHL history to have a surname beginning with the letter X. Xhekaj earned the nickname "Wi-Fi" from his teammates due its underlying spelling being perceived as similar to a default password programmed onto an internet router. He picked up his first NHL point, an assist, on October 15 versus the Washington Capitals, and drew further headlines shortly thereafter for winning his first fight in the NHL against Arizona Coyotes forward Zack Kassian, one of the league's more noted enforcers. Xhekaj scored his first NHL goal in a 5–2 loss to the Dallas Stars on October 22, also recording an assist in the same game. Xhekaj's debut season ended when he sustained a season-ending shoulder injury on February 12, 2023. In 51 games with the Canadiens, he recorded five goals and eight assists, and led the team in penalty minutes with 101.

Resuming play to start the 2023–24 season, Xhekaj once again sustained an upper-body injury on November 17, 2023, missing seven games as a result. Upon reactivation from the injured reserve list at the beginning of December 2023, the Canadiens assigned him to the Rocket for part of the 2023–24 AHL season. He was initially tasked with working on his defensive game while in Laval, and was soon paired with rookie defenceman Logan Mailloux, collectively playing a key role in the Rocket's surge up the league standings. After appearing in 17 AHL games, recording three goals and eight assists over that span, Xhekaj was recalled to Montreal on January 22, 2024. On April 9, it was announced that Xhekaj would undergo season-ending surgery due to injury sustained in a game against the Tampa Bay Lightning days prior. In 44 games with the Canadiens, he recorded three goals and seven assists in his second NHL season.

As a restricted free agent following season's end, Xhekaj was tendered a qualifying offer by the Canadiens on June 30, 2024. A month later, he signed a two-year, $2.6 million contract extension. Entering play for the 2024–25 season, Xhekaj was involved in an incident with Toronto Maple Leafs forward Cédric Paré during a preseason game on September 29, 2024, where was assessed a fine for unsportsmanlike conduct by the NHL Department of Player Safety. Shortly thereafter, he skated in his 100th career NHL game on October 17. Xhekaj's performance earned praise for much of the season, however, after errors during the team's closing push to make the 2025 Stanley Cup playoffs, he was subsequently scratched for their final five games. He remained out of the lineup for the start of the Canadiens' ensuing first round playoff matchup against the Washington Capitals, but eventually made his NHL playoff debut midway through the series on April 25, 2025.

A restricted free agent following the conclusion of the 2025–26 season, Xhekaj signed a one-year, $1.5 million contract extension with the Canadiens on September 15, 2026.

== Personal life ==
Xhekaj's father, Jack, is Albanian from Drenas, Kosovo, and his mother, Simona, is from Hradec Králové, Czech Republic. Both left their native countries in the 1990s amidst political conflict, and first met at a hotel in Hamilton.

His younger brother, Florian, who also plays in the Canadiens organization, was selected 101st overall by the team in the 2023 NHL entry draft. On November 22, 2025, the Xhekaj brothers became the 14th pair in franchise history to play a regular-season NHL game together for Montreal, and the first since Andrei and Sergei Kostitsyn during the 2007–08 season.

Following the cancellation of the 2020–21 OHL season due to the COVID-19 pandemic, Xhekaj worked at a Costco in the Hamilton area.

== Career statistics ==
			Regular season					Playoffs
Season	Team	League	GP	G	A	Pts	PIM	GP	G	A	Pts	PIM
2017–18	St. Catharines Falcons	GOJHL	46	4	18	22	110	11	0	1	1	24
2018–19	Kitchener Rangers	OHL	59	2	1	3	39	4	0	0	0	2
2019–20	Kitchener Rangers	OHL	51	6	11	17	88	—	—	—	—	—
2021–22	Kitchener Rangers	OHL	18	6	11	17	54	—	—	—	—	—
2021–22	Hamilton Bulldogs	OHL	33	6	11	17	84	18	6	10	16	50
2022–23	Montreal Canadiens	NHL	51	5	8	13	101	—	—	—	—	—
2023–24	Montreal Canadiens	NHL	44	3	7	10	81	—	—	—	—	—
2023–24	Laval Rocket	AHL	17	3	8	11	34	—	—	—	—	—
2024–25	Montreal Canadiens	NHL	70	1	5	6	118	3	0	0	0	4
2025–26	Montreal Canadiens	NHL	65	1	3	4	116	13	1	1	2	28
NHL totals			230	10	23	33	416	16	1	1	2	32

== Awards and honours ==
Awards	Year	Ref
OHL
J. Ross Robertson Cup champion	2022	
Third All-Star Team	2022	
CHL
Memorial Cup All-Star Team	2022	
