= Diving (association football) =

Simulating a foul in association football

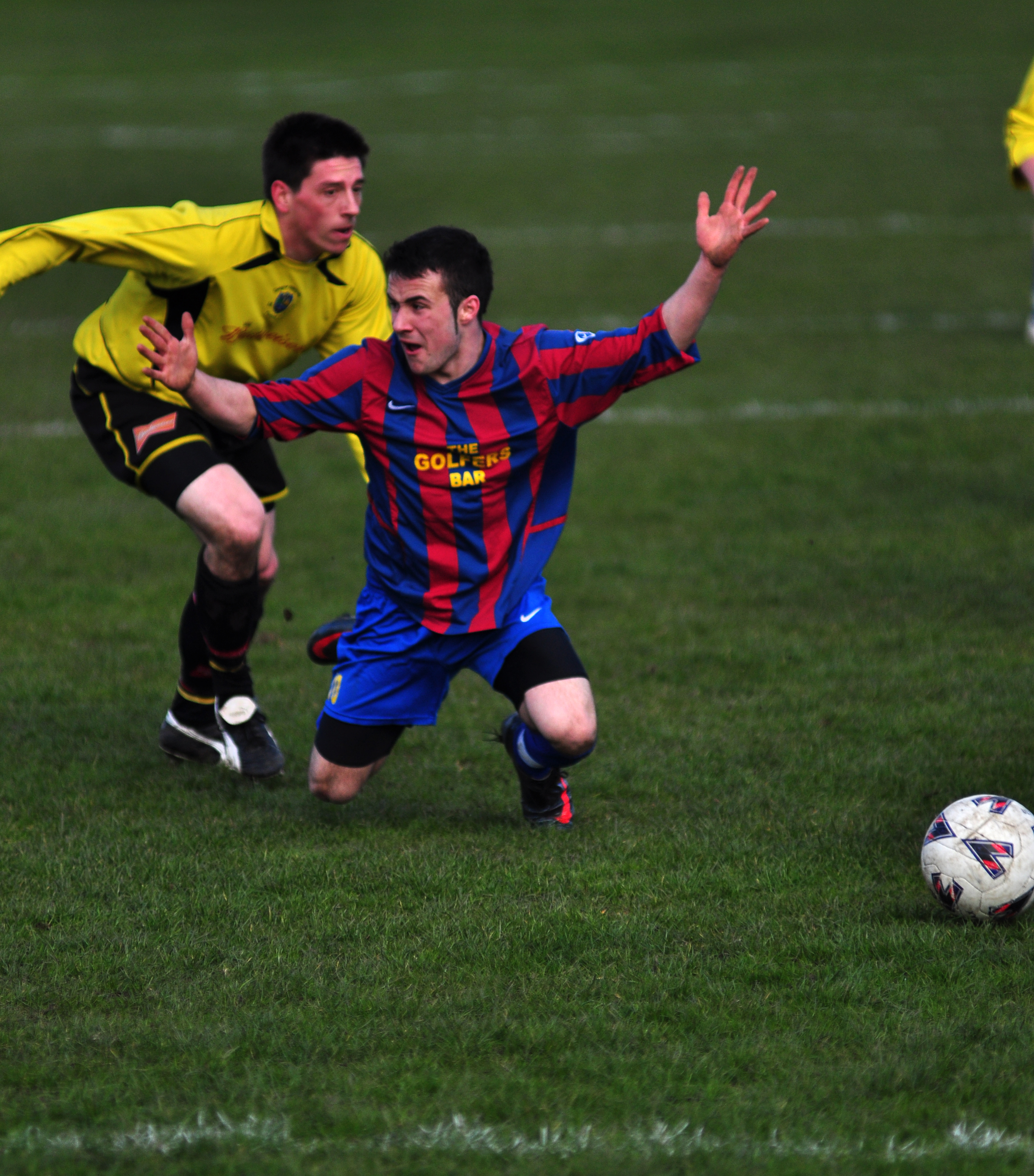
The player in blue and red's raised arms and look at the referee indicate a possible dive.

In association football, diving is an attempt by a player to gain an unfair advantage by falling to the ground and, often, faking injury to give the impression that a foul has been committed. Dives are often used to exaggerate the amount of contact made during a challenge. Deciding whether a player has dived is often very subjective and among the most controversial areas of football discussion. Motivations for diving include receiving scoring opportunities via free kicks or penalty kicks or gaining a team advantage by invoking a penalty card for the opposition. Diving may also be referred to as simulation (the term used by FIFA), Schwalbe (used in continental European countries; lit. German for "swallow"), staging (for free kicks, Australia) and flopping (North American sports in general).

== Detection ==
A 2009 study found that there are recognisable traits that can often be observed when a player is diving. They are:

- a separation in time between the impact and the simulation
- a lack of ballistic continuity (the player moves farther than would be expected from the momentum of the tackle)
- lack of contact consistency (the player nurses a body part other than where the impact occurred, such as contact to the chest causing the player to fly to the ground, holding their face)
- the "Archer's bow" pose, where the head is tilted back, chest thrust forward, arms raised and both legs bent at the knee to lift both feet off the ground to the rear, is recognised as a characteristic sign of simulation, as the action is counter to normal reflex mechanisms to protect the body in a fall.

== Punishment ==
The game's rules state that "attempts to deceive the referee by feigning injury or pretending to have been fouled (simulation)" must be sanctioned as unsporting behaviour which is misconduct punishable by a yellow card. The rule changes are in response to an increasing trend of diving and simulation.

=== Europe ===
In 2009, UEFA made the decision to ban Arsenal forward Eduardo da Silva for a dive during a Champions League qualifier against Celtic. Eduardo initially received a penalty after referee Manuel Mejuto González believed Eduardo had been fouled by Celtic goalkeeper Artur Boruc, but video evidence suggested there was no contact between Eduardo and Boruc. Eduardo scored the subsequent penalty, with the goal putting Arsenal 3–0 up on aggregate. Arsenal manager Arsène Wenger claimed the ban, which was to last two games, was "a complete disgrace and unacceptable", as it singled out Eduardo as a cheat, something which UEFA would be unable to prove. The ban was subsequently overturned on appeal, with Eduardo saying he was pleased UEFA had "arrived at the truth" as he was a "fair player" and was "not the type of player who needs to be dishonest".

In 2011, Rangers player Sone Aluko was banned for two games for simulation by the Scottish FA. During a game against Dunfermline Athletic, Aluko won a penalty which was converted by Nikica Jelavić and which proved to be the decisive goal. Dunfermline manager Jim McIntyre claimed it was "never a penalty" as there was no contact, and that Aluko was "obviously trying to get his team into a lead". Former referee Kenny Clark said that, while there was contact, it was "not enough to cause a man to spill a pint in a pub far less to fall over". After a club appeal had failed, Rangers manager Ally McCoist said he was "shocked and extremely angry" at the decision of the panel, which included former referee Jim McCluskey, who McCoist was critical of in particular, saying "his decision making hasn't improved any since he stopped refereeing".

In England, starting in the summer of 2017, a three-man panel consisting of a former player, a former manager, and a former match official would independently review video evidence on the Monday after games. Any player whom the three-man panel unanimously decided had caused an opponent to be sent off or had won a penalty as a result of deceiving the referee by simulation would be charged by the Football Association with "Successful Deception of a Match Official" which carried a penalty of suspension for two matches. If a player is found guilty of deceiving an official or admits to the charge, the yellow or red card given to the opposing player can be rescinded. In November 2017, Bristol City player Bailey Wright became the first player to be banned two matches by the Football Association for diving while playing against Fulham and Aboubakar Kamara's red card was rescinded. In November 2017, Everton player Oumar Niasse became the first top-flight player to be banned two matches by the FA for diving while playing against Crystal Palace. In February 2023, Tottenham Women's Eveliina Summanen became the first female top-flight player to be banned two matches by the FA for diving while playing against Manchester United Women, and Ella Toone's red card was rescinded.

=== North America ===
Major League Soccer in the United States began implementing fines and suspensions for the 2011 season for simulation through its Disciplinary Committee, which reviews plays after the match.

On 24 June 2011, MLS penalised D.C. United forward Charlie Davies with a US$1,000 fine as the Disciplinary Committee ruled he "intentionally deceived the officials and gained an unfair advantage which directly impacted the match" in a simulation that occurred in a match against Real Salt Lake on 18 June 2011.

On 29 July 2011, the Disciplinary Committee suspended Real Salt Lake forward Álvaro Saborío one game and fined him US$1,000 for a simulation in a game against the San Jose Earthquakes on 23 July 2011. Officials noted the simulation resulted in Earthquakes defender Bobby Burling being sent off on the simulation, and the warning from MLS that fines and suspensions will increase for simulation being detected by the Disciplinary Committee. Furthermore, suspensions caused by players being sent off by another player's simulation can be rescinded. For example, if A2 is assessed a red card for a foul when B3 had created a simulation to make it seem A2 committed a hard foul when it was a simulation, the Disciplinary Committee can rescind the red card and suspension for A2.

=== Oceania ===
In all football leagues, including youth leagues, a player who dives intentionally will be subject to a warning or yellow card if caught in a match. If a match is reviewed and a player is caught, they may receive a one match suspension. In cases where this occurs a third time in a season, a five match suspension will be issued, or a suspension until the end of the current season, whichever is longer. The Oceania Football Confederation also has the right to ban players who intentionally dive to get a penalty or free kick. These rules are in effect for club and international matches.

== Diving as deceptive behaviour ==
In 2011, researchers studying signalling in animals examined diving in the context of communication theory, which suggests that deceptive behaviour should occur when the potential payoffs outweigh the potential costs (or punishments). Their aim was to discern when and where diving is likely to occur, with the aim of identifying ways to stop it.

The researchers watched hundreds of hours of matches across six European professional leagues and found that diving is more likely to occur a) near the offensive goal and b) when the match is tied. None of the 169 dives seen in the study were punished.

It was also found that diving was more common in leagues where it was rewarded most – meaning that the more often players were likely to get free kicks or penalties out of a dive, the more often they dived. This suggests that the benefits of diving are far outweighing the costs, and the only way to reduce diving in football is by increasing the ability of referees to detect dives and by increasing the punishment associated with them.

Dr. Robbie Wilson, a member of the group that conducted the study, said: "Some progressive professional leagues, such as the Australian A-League and the American MLS have already started handing down punishments for players found guilty of diving. This is the best way to decrease the incentive for diving".

Some have referred to simulation as a menace to footballers with real, sometimes life-threatening, injuries or conditions. On 24 May 2012, English FA referee Howard Webb spoke to a FIFA medical conference in Budapest about the importance of curbing simulation in football, as players feigning injury could put players with serious medical issues in jeopardy. Earlier that year, he had to deal with the collapse of Fabrice Muamba, who suffered cardiac arrest during an FA Cup match.

== Diving reputation ==
Repeated accusations of diving have resulted in certain players acquiring the reputation of being a "diver".

Over the years, players who have a reputation of being divers include:

- (Brazil) David Luiz
- (Brazil) Neymar
- (Brazil) Richarlison
- (Colombia) James Rodriguez
- (Ivory Coast) Didier Drogba
- (Ivory Coast) Wilfried Zaha
- (Egypt) Mohamed Salah
- (England) Ashley Young
- (England) Dele Alli
- (England) Jack Grealish
- (England) Raheem Sterling
- (England) Wayne Rooney
- (Germany) Jürgen Klinsmann
- (Greece) Giorgos Karagounis
- (Iran) Mehdi Taremi
- (Republic of Ireland) James McClean
- (Italy) Filippo Inzaghi
- (Portugal) Cristiano Ronaldo
- (Portugal) Nani
- (Portugal) Pepe
- (Romania) Florin Tănase
- (Senegal) Sadio Mané
- (Spain) Sergio Busquets
- (Spain) Sergio Ramos
- (Uruguay) Luis Suárez
- (Wales) Gareth Bale
- (Netherlands) Arjen Robben

== See also ==
- Unsportsmanlike conduct
- Sportsmanship
- Gamesmanship
- Flop (basketball)
- Diving (ice hockey)
- Cheating
