= Jake Walman =

Canadian ice hockey player (born 1996)

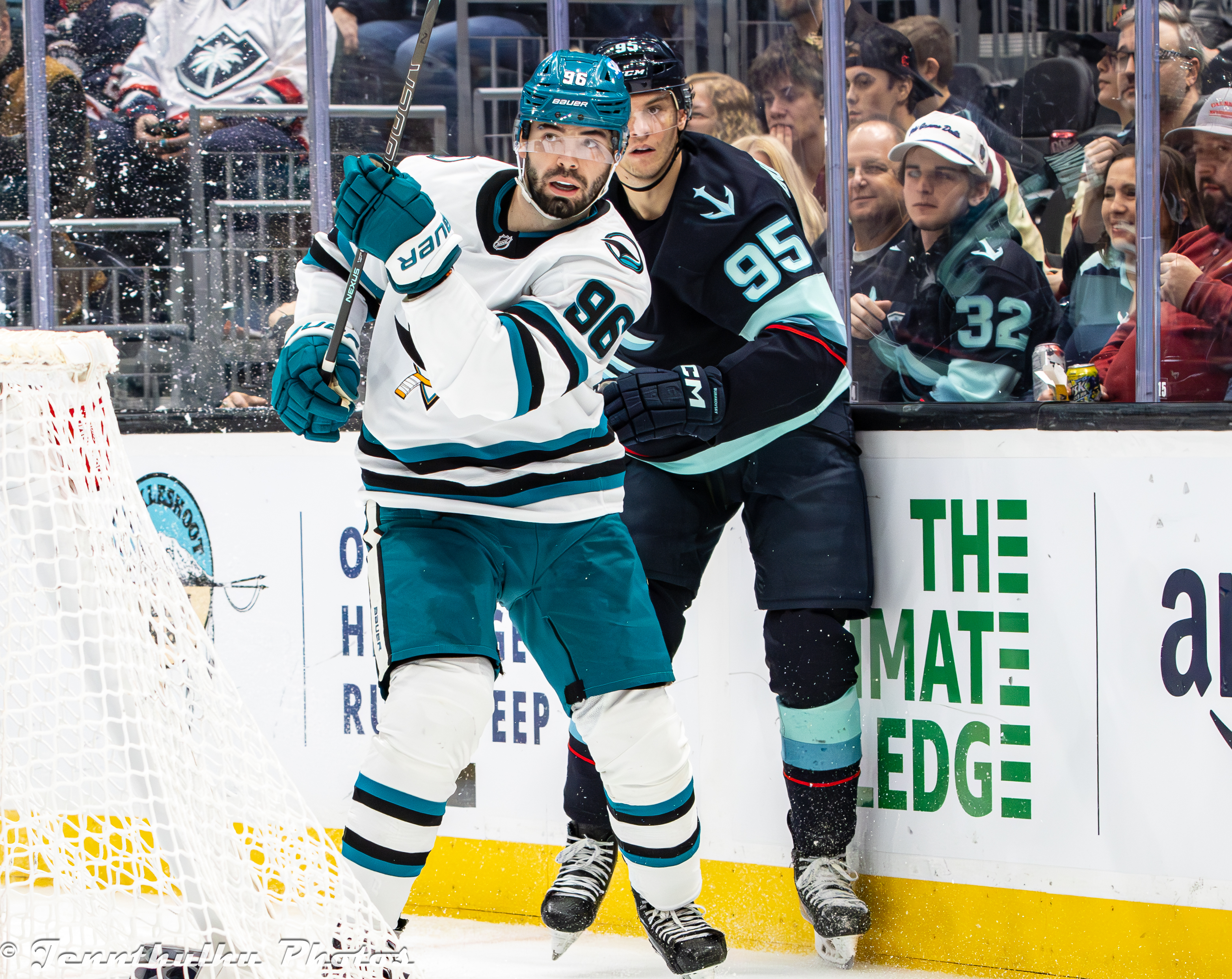
- Walman (foreground) with the San Jose Sharks in 2024
- Born: February 20, 1996 (age 30) Toronto, Ontario, Canada
- Height: 6 ft 1 in (185 cm)
- Weight: 210 lb (95 kg; 15 st 0 lb)
- Position: Defence
- Shoots: Left
- NHL team Former teams: Edmonton Oilers; St. Louis Blues; Detroit Red Wings; San Jose Sharks
- NHL draft: 82nd overall, 2014; St. Louis Blues
- Playing career: 2017–present

Jake Walman (born February 20, 1996) is a Canadian professional ice hockey player who is a defenceman for the Edmonton Oilers of the National Hockey League (NHL). He was drafted 82nd overall by the St. Louis Blues in the 2014 NHL entry draft.

== Personal life ==
Walman was born in Toronto, Ontario, Canada, and is Jewish. He holds American citizenship, through his mother Mary-Anne, a native of Providence, Rhode Island. Jake LaMotta was his mother's uncle.

== Playing career ==
Walman played junior hockey with the Toronto Jr. Canadiens in the Ontario Junior Hockey League (OJHL) before committing to collegiate hockey with Providence College of the Hockey East. Prior to his freshman season with the Friars, Walman was selected at the 2014 NHL entry draft in the third round, 82nd overall, by the St. Louis Blues.

On March 28, 2017, having completed his junior season with the Friars in 2016–17, Walman concluded his collegiate career early, signing a three-year, entry-level contract with the St. Louis Blues.

Walman made his NHL debut for the Blues during the 2019–20 season. In three seasons with the Blues he recorded four goals and four assists in 57 games.

On March 21, 2022, Walman was traded to the Detroit Red Wings, along with Oskar Sundqvist, and a second-round pick in 2023 NHL entry draft, in exchange for Nick Leddy and Luke Witkowski.

On August 11, 2022, Walman was re-signed as a restricted free agent by the Red Wings to a one-year, $1.05 million contract extension for the 2022–23 season. After opening the season on the injured-reserve, Walman returned and was given an increased role on the team, playing alongside Moritz Seider. Walman scored the overtime-winning goal for the Red Wings on December 28 against the Pittsburgh Penguins, during which Detroit initially trailed by a 4–0 score. He subsequently went viral for celebrating with the Griddy dance. On February 28, 2023, Walman was re-signed to a three-year, $10.2 million contract extension with the Red Wings.

On June 25, 2024, he was traded to the San Jose Sharks, along with a second-round pick in the 2024 NHL entry draft, in exchange for future considerations. On March 6, 2025, he was traded to the Edmonton Oilers in exchange for Carl Berglund and a conditional first-round pick in the 2026 NHL entry draft. On October 6, 2025, Walman signed a seven-year, $49,000,000 contract with the Oilers.

== International play ==
Walman, a dual citizen who exclusively trained in the Canadian hockey system attended the training camp for the United States men's national junior ice hockey team in preparation for the 2016 World Junior Ice Hockey Championships.

Despite being considered a lock to make the team, Walman wasn't eligible to play for the Americans, despite living in Providence, Rhode Island, for 16 months due to not meeting the IIHF’s requirement of playing two consecutive seasons in the country in order to play for the national team, as he was in the midst of his second season playing in the United States.

USA Hockey attempted to appeal the ruling, which was denied by the IIHF. Following the ruling, Walman was invited to the Canadian men’s national junior ice hockey team’s selection camp, but did not make the final roster.

Walman accepted an invitation to join the Canadian national team at the 2023 IIHF World Championship. He was however forced to withdraw his name from the roster due to an upper-body injury, prior to the start of the tournament.

== Career statistics ==
			Regular season					Playoffs
Season	Team	League	GP	G	A	Pts	PIM	GP	G	A	Pts	PIM
2013–14	Toronto Jr. Canadiens	OJHL	43	7	26	33	87	—	—	—	—	—
2014–15	Providence College	HE	41	1	15	16	44	—	—	—	—	—
2015–16	Providence College	HE	27	13	15	28	20	—	—	—	—	—
2016–17	Providence College	HE	39	7	18	25	42	—	—	—	—	—
2016–17	Chicago Wolves	AHL	7	2	1	3	2	8	2	1	3	2
2017–18	Chicago Wolves	AHL	40	2	11	13	14	—	—	—	—	—
2017–18	Binghamton Devils	AHL	19	2	5	7	10	—	—	—	—	—
2018–19	San Antonio Rampage	AHL	66	3	10	13	48	—	—	—	—	—
2019–20	San Antonio Rampage	AHL	57	8	19	27	32	—	—	—	—	—
2019–20	St. Louis Blues	NHL	1	0	0	0	0	—	—	—	—	—
2020–21	St. Louis Blues	NHL	24	1	1	2	8	1	0	0	0	0
2021–22	St. Louis Blues	NHL	32	3	3	6	6	—	—	—	—	—
2021–22	Detroit Red Wings	NHL	19	0	4	4	4	—	—	—	—	—
2022–23	Detroit Red Wings	NHL	63	9	9	18	45	—	—	—	—	—
2023–24	Detroit Red Wings	NHL	63	12	9	21	44	—	—	—	—	—
2024–25	San Jose Sharks	NHL	50	6	26	32	36	—	—	—	—	—
2024–25	Edmonton Oilers	NHL	15	1	7	8	6	22	2	8	10	12
2025–26	Edmonton Oilers	NHL	53	8	12	20	10	6	0	4	4	8
NHL totals			320	40	71	111	159	29	2	12	14	20

== Awards and honours ==
Award	Year
OJHL
First Team All-Prospect	2014
Rookie of the Year	2014
Top Prospect Award	2014
OHA B.J. Monro Memorial Trophy	2014
CJHL Rookie of the Year	2014
CJHL Top Prospect Award	2014
College
HE First All-Star Team	2016, 2017
New England D1 All-Stars	2016, 2017
East First All-American Team	2016
East Second All-American Team	2017

== See also ==
- List of select Jewish ice hockey players
