= Hayden Hodgson =

Canadian ice hockey player (born 1996)

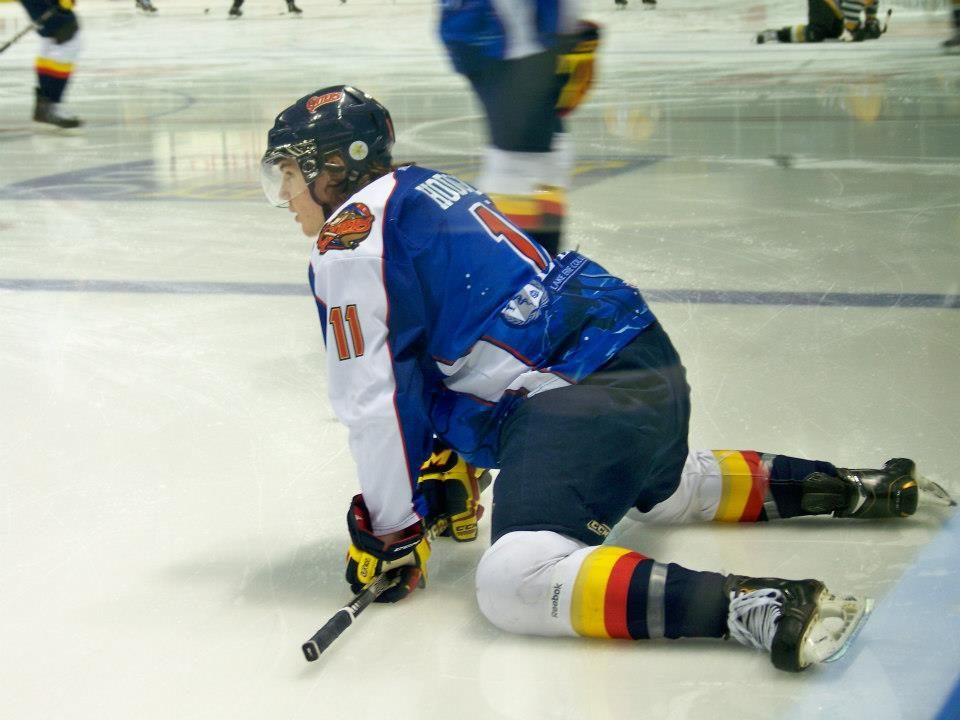
- Hodgson with the Erie Otters in 2013
- Born: March 2, 1996 (age 30) Windsor, Ontario, Canada
- Height: 6 ft 2 in (188 cm)
- Weight: 207 lb (94 kg; 14 st 11 lb)
- Position: Right wing
- Shoots: Right
- NHL team Former teams: Ottawa Senators; Philadelphia Flyers
- NHL draft: Undrafted
- Playing career: 2017–present

Hayden Hodgson (born March 2, 1996) is a Canadian professional ice hockey right winger for the Ottawa Senators of the National Hockey League (NHL). He previously played for the Philadelphia Flyers.

== Early life ==
Hodgson was born on March 2, 1996, in Windsor, Ontario, to Christine and Todd Hodgson. He grew up playing ice hockey, baseball, and golf in Leamington, Ontario, and spent most of his adolescence deciding whether he would pursue hockey or baseball professionally. Despite collecting several awards for golf, he abandoned that sport when his golf swing negatively impacted his baseball batting. Hodgson spent the 2011–12 season playing minor ice hockey for the Sun County Panthers of the Alliance Hockey organization, scoring 21 goals and recording 41 points in 28 games, while pitching for the Windsor Selects under-16 team.

== Playing career ==
=== Amateur ===
The Erie Otters of the Ontario Hockey League (OHL) drafted Hodgson in the third round, 44th overall, of the 2012 OHL Priority Selection. His first OHL goal came on October 24 as part of the Otters' 7–1 rout of the Saginaw Spirit. He did not score again until November 23, when he recorded the first goal in the Otters' 3–2 loss to the Guelph Storm. On February 24, Hodgson collided with Henri Ikonen of the Kingston Frontenacs. He was assessed a major interference penalty and was ejected from the game, while Ikonen, who was leading the Frontenacs at that point with 48 points, sustained a concussion. The OHL issued Hodgson a ten-game suspension for the hit, and as the suspension came with only seven games left in the 2012–13 season, Hodgson's rookie year ended early. He recorded eight goals and 12 points in 60 games.

Hodgson recorded the first goal of his sophomore OHL season on November 11, 2013, in a 5–3 win over the Niagara IceDogs. After netting four goals, nine points, and 45 penalty minutes in 34 games with Erie during the 2013–14 season, Hodgson was traded to the Sarnia Sting on January 10, 2014, in exchange for a third-round pick in the 2015 OHL priority selection draft. In his first game with his new team, Hodgson was assessed a major penalty for an illegal check to the head of Plymouth Whalers skater Liam Dunda. After review, he was suspended for another ten games. After the trade, Hodgson recorded five goals, nine points, and 19 penalty minutes in 18 games with Sarnia.

After joining the National Hockey League (NHL)'s Detroit Red Wings' rookie camp on a tryout, Hodgson returned to the Sting for the 2014–15 season. He put up 23 goals and 38 points in 59 games with Sarnia. The Sting made the playoffs and faced the Erie Otters in the first round. The Otters eliminated the Sting in five games, with Hodgson potting two goals in the series. He began the 2015–16 season with Sarnia. On January 12, 2016, the Sting sent Hodgson to the Saginaw Spirit in exchange for centre Devon Paliani and four draft picks in the 2016 draft. Hodgson had struggled to that point with the Sting, with only five goals and 14 points in 36 games. In 20 games with Saginaw he tallied four goals and nine points. The Spirit qualified for the playoffs, but were eliminated by the Erie Otters in four games. In the series, Hodgson added three assists.

=== Professional ===
Hodgson went undrafted by NHL teams. On March 23, 2017, Hodgson signed a contract with the Cleveland Monsters, the American Hockey League (AHL) affiliate of the NHL's Columbus Blue Jackets. He played one split season with Cleveland in 2017–18, tallying three goals and six points while also spending periods in the ECHL with the Florida Everblades, appearing in three games and going scoreless, and the Manchester Monarchs where he notched two assists in two games. For the 2018–19, he split the season between the Wichita Thunder of the ECHL, where he scored two goals and four points in 13 games before going to Europe on a better contract. He was suspended by the Thunder upon his departure. In Europe, he played with HC 07 Detva in Slovakia, where he recorded seven goals and 14 points in 21 games. He returned to North America for the 2019–20 season, where the Thunder traded his ECHL rights were traded to the Reading Royals for future considerations. However, he suffered a serious cut to his leg during play and missed two months. In 36 games, he registered 12 goals and 20 points. The Royals chose not to resume play during the pandemic in the 2020–21 season, but Hodgson wanted to play and he was first sent to the Wheeling Nailers, where he scored two goals and six points in 18 games before he was traded the Utah Grizzlies for future considerations. In 26 games with Utah, he tallied six goals and 12 points. The Grizzlies qualified for the playoffs, but were swept by the Allen Americans in the first round. In the three-game series, Hodgson added one assist.

He returned to the Royals for the 2021–22 season but tried out for the Lehigh Valley Phantoms of the AHL, the affiliate of the NHL's Philadelphia Flyers. He earned a two-way contract with the Phantoms. In 46 games with the Phantoms he notched 19 goals and 31 points. On March 22, 2022, the Flyers signed Hodgson to an NHL contract for the remainder of the 2021–22 season, with an average annual value of $750,000. He made his NHL debut two nights later when the Flyers faced the St. Louis Blues, filling in for an injured Oskar Lindblom. Hodgson recorded his first NHL goal and assist in his debut, and the Flyers won 5–2 at the Enterprise Center, their first win on the road of 2022. He appeared in six games for Philadelphia, scoring the one goal and three points. On August 29, it was announced that Hodgson had re-signed with Philadelphia to a two-year contract that was two-way in 2022–23 and one-way in 2023–24. He opened the 2022–23 season on the Flyers roster and made one appearance before he was placed on waivers. After going unclaimed, he was assigned to Lehigh Valley where he spent the remainder of the season, scoring three goals and eight points in 44 games.

On June 6, 2023, Hodgson was sent to the Los Angeles Kings as part of a three-team trade with Philadelphia and Columbus. He was placed on waivers again to start the season and went unclaimed and was assigned to the Kings' AHL affiliate, the Ontario Reign. Hodgson played the entire 2023–24 season with the Reign. He recorded six goals and 16 points in 49 games. He was suspended for three games on March 16, 2024, by the AHL following an illegal check in a game against the Coachella Valley Firebirds. The Reign made the playoffs but were eliminated by Coachella Valley in the second round. He was suspended a second time on May 18 for two playoff games for an interference penalty during a playoff game against Coachella Valley. In seven playoff games, Hodgson tallied one goal.

On July 2, 2024, the Ottawa Senators signed Hodgson as an unrestricted free agent to a one-year, two-way contract. He passed through waivers, going unclaimed, and was assigned to the Senators' AHL affiliate, the Belleville Senators, to start the 2024–25 season. In 43 games with Belleville, he tallied five goals and 11 points. He was suspended for two games by the AHL on April 4, 2025 for due to his actions in a game against the Syracuse Crunch in which he started a fight within the final minute of action and received a game misconduct penalty on the same play. He was recalled on April 11, 2025, and made his Ottawa debut that night against the Montreal Canadiens. He made one more appearance that season, going scoreless in the two games.

In the offseason, he signed a two-year, two-way contract to return to Ottawa. During training camp, Hodgson was fined by the NHL for an illegal check during a preseason exhibition game against the Montreal Canadiens. He was assigned to the AHL to start the 2025–26 season after passing through waivers. He was recalled from Belleville on November 9 and made his NHL season debut that night in a 4–2 victory over the Utah Mammoth. He was returned to the AHL on December 2. He was recalled twice more during the season, appearing in ten games with Ottawa, going scoreless. On February 3, 2026, he was suspended by the AHL for five games for an illegal check. In 47 games with Belleville, he recorded six goals and 11 points.

== Career statistics ==
			Regular season					Playoffs
Season	Team	League	GP	G	A	Pts	PIM	GP	G	A	Pts	PIM
2011–12	Sun County Panthers U16 AAA	ALLIANCE	42	29	25	54	82	—	—	—	—	—
2011–12	Leamington Flyers	GOJHL	1	0	0	0	0	—	—	—	—	—
2012–13	Erie Otters	OHL	60	8	4	12	60	—	—	—	—	—
2013–14	Erie Otters	OHL	34	4	5	9	45	—	—	—	—	—
2013–14	Sarnia Sting	OHL	18	5	4	9	19	—	—	—	—	—
2014–15	Sarnia Sting	OHL	59	23	15	38	62	5	2	0	2	9
2015–16	Sarnia Sting	OHL	36	5	9	14	53	—	—	—	—	—
2015–16	Saginaw Spirit	OHL	20	4	5	9	21	4	0	3	3	4
2016–17	Saginaw Spirit	OHL	67	38	28	66	71	—	—	—	—	—
2017–18	Cleveland Monsters	AHL	41	3	3	6	35	—	—	—	—	—
2017–18	Florida Everblades	ECHL	3	0	0	0	0	—	—	—	—	—
2017–18	Manchester Monarchs	ECHL	2	0	2	2	2	—	—	—	—	—
2018–19	Wichita Thunder	ECHL	13	2	2	4	22	—	—	—	—	—
2018–19	HC 07 Detva	2HL	21	7	7	14	43	6	0	0	0	2
2019–20	Reading Royals	ECHL	36	12	8	20	49	—	—	—	—	—
2020–21	Wheeling Nailers	ECHL	18	2	4	6	41	—	—	—	—	—
2020–21	Utah Grizzlies	ECHL	26	6	6	12	86	3	0	1	1	12
2021–22	Lehigh Valley Phantoms	AHL	46	19	12	31	70	—	—	—	—	—
2021–22	Philadelphia Flyers	NHL	6	1	2	3	11	—	—	—	—	—
2022–23	Philadelphia Flyers	NHL	1	0	0	0	0	—	—	—	—	—
2022–23	Lehigh Valley Phantoms	AHL	44	3	5	8	83	—	—	—	—	—
2023–24	Ontario Reign	AHL	49	6	10	16	116	7	1	0	1	30
2024–25	Belleville Senators	AHL	43	5	6	11	156	—	—	—	—	—
2024–25	Ottawa Senators	NHL	2	0	0	0	5	—	—	—	—	—
2025–26	Belleville Senators	AHL	47	6	5	11	134	—	—	—	—	—
2025–26	Ottawa Senators	NHL	10	0	0	0	11	—	—	—	—	—
NHL totals			19	1	2	3	27	—	—	—	—	—
