= Michael McCarron =

American ice hockey player (born 1995)

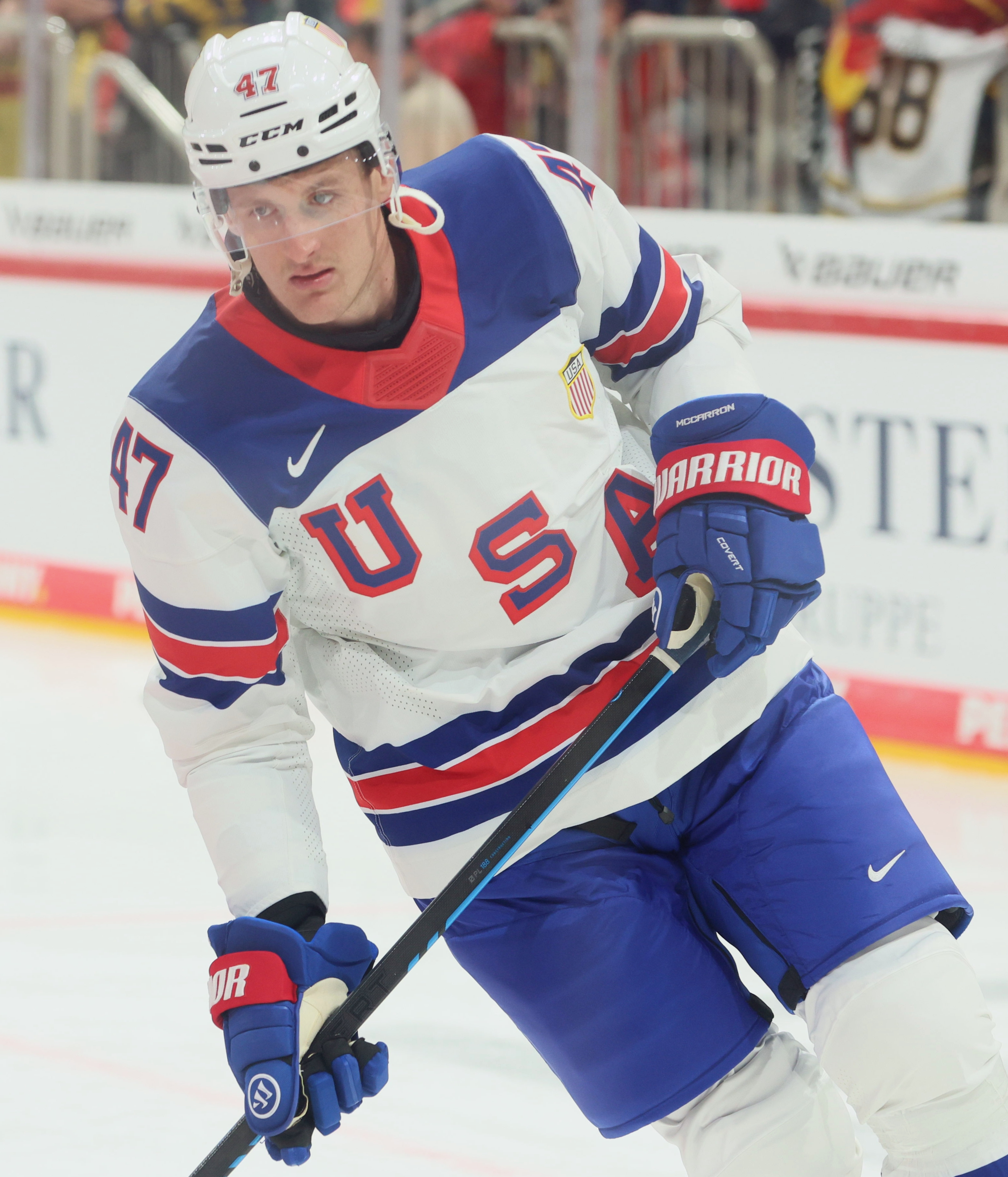
- McCarron in 2025
- Born: March 7, 1995 (age 31) Grosse Pointe, Michigan, U.S.
- Height: 6 ft 6 in (198 cm)
- Weight: 232 lb (105 kg; 16 st 8 lb)
- Position: Forward
- Shoots: Right
- NHL team Former teams: Minnesota Wild; Montreal Canadiens; Nashville Predators
- NHL draft: 25th overall, 2013; Montreal Canadiens
- Playing career: 2015–present

Michael McCarron (born March 7, 1995) is an American professional hockey player who is a forward for the Minnesota Wild of the National Hockey League (NHL). He was selected in the first round, 25th overall, by the Montreal Canadiens in the 2013 NHL entry draft. McCarron has also previously played for the Nashville Predators.

== Playing career ==
As a youth, he played in the 2008 Quebec International Pee-Wee Hockey Tournament with the Detroit Belle Tire minor ice hockey team.

McCarron was rated as a top prospect who fulfilled the expectation to be a first round selection at the 2013 NHL entry draft. He trained with the USA Hockey National Team Development Program (USNTDP) team from 2011 to 2013, and won a silver medal at the 2013 IIHF World U18 Championships.

McCarron initially committed to play for the National Collegiate Athletic Association (NCAA) Western Michigan University Broncos, before opting out to continue his development through Canadian junior ranks with the London Knights of the Ontario Hockey League (OHL). Originally playing (and drafted) as a right winger, McCarron made the switch to center during his first OHL season. On July 11, 2013, McCarron was signed to a three-year, entry-level contract with the Montreal Canadiens.

In the midst of the 2014–15 season, McCarron was traded by the Knights to OHL contenders, the Oshawa Generals, on January 1, 2015, with whom he won the J. Ross Robertson Cup and Memorial Cup.

After a good start in his first professional year in 2015–16, he was called up by the Canadiens and played two games in the National Hockey League (NHL), though without picking up any points. As a result of his good play in the American Hockey League (AHL), McCarron was named to the 2016 AHL All-Star Classic. He was later called up again by the Canadiens on February 26, 2016, after forwards Dale Weise and Tomáš Fleischmann were traded to the Chicago Blackhawks. On February 27, he recorded his first NHL point, an assist on a Devante Smith-Pelly goal, in a 4–1 win against the Toronto Maple Leafs. He scored his first NHL goal in a 4–1 loss to the Calgary Flames on March 20, 2016.

While playing with the Canadiens' AHL affiliate, the Laval Rocket, during the 2018–19 season, McCarron underwent a season-ending surgery on his left shoulder in February 2019.

McCarron became a restricted free agent after the 2018–19 season. On July 27, 2019, he signed a one-year, two-way contract with the Canadiens.

Continuing with Laval, McCarron entered the 2019–20 season, contributing with five goals and 14 points in 29 games. Having been passed on the depth chart and with limited prospects with the Canadiens, McCarron was traded to the Nashville Predators in exchange for Laurent Dauphin on January 7, 2020.

On December 11, 2022, McCarron entered the NHL Player Assistance Program for issues related to substance abuse, and returned more than a month later, on January 18, 2023.

On April 16, 2023, McCarron signed a one-year, $775,000 contract with the Predators.

On February 16, 2024, McCarron signed a two-year, $1.8 million contract with the Predators.

During the 2025–26 season, having posted 12 points through 59 games, McCarron was traded by the Predators to the Minnesota Wild in exchange for a 2028 second-round draft pick on March 3, 2026. During the Wild's first round series against the Dallas Stars during the 2026 Stanley Cup playoffs, he scored his first playoff goal during the second period when he took a pass from Marcus Foligno, entered the offensive zone 1-on-2, and beat Dallas goalie Jake Oettinger far side.

On June 9, 2026, McCarron signed a six-year, $19.8 million contract ($3.3 million average annual value) with the Minnesota Wild.

== International play ==
Medal record

Representing United States

Ice hockey

World Championships
Gold medal – first place	2025 Sweden/Denmark	

McCarron represented the United States at the 2025 IIHF World Championship, where he recorded one goal and one assist in ten games and helped Team USA win their first gold medal since 1933.

== Personal life ==
While playing for the Predators' AHL affiliate, the Milwaukee Admirals, he was given the nickname "Big Show", which was later changed to "Big Sexy" by then teammate Matt Benning.

== Career statistics ==
=== Regular season and playoffs ===
			Regular season					Playoffs
Season	Team	League	GP	G	A	Pts	PIM	GP	G	A	Pts	PIM
2010–11	Honeybaked 18U AAA	T1EHL	38	6	12	18	88	—	—	—	—	—
2011–12	U.S. NTDP Juniors	USHL	35	3	14	17	112	1	0	1	1	2
2011–12	U.S. NTDP U17	USDP	53	6	21	27	128	—	—	—	—	—
2012–13	U.S. NTDP Juniors	USHL	19	5	5	10	84	—	—	—	—	—
2012–13	U.S. NTDP U18	USDP	59	16	21	37	182	—	—	—	—	—
2013–14	London Knights	OHL	66	14	20	34	120	9	3	2	5	22
2014–15	London Knights	OHL	25	22	19	41	58	—	—	—	—	—
2014–15	Oshawa Generals	OHL	31	6	21	27	70	21	9	9	18	33
2015–16	St. John's IceCaps	AHL	58	17	21	38	91	—	—	—	—	—
2015–16	Montreal Canadiens	NHL	20	1	1	2	37	—	—	—	—	—
2016–17	St. John's IceCaps	AHL	32	7	12	19	66	2	0	0	0	6
2016–17	Montreal Canadiens	NHL	31	1	4	5	41	1	0	0	0	0
2017–18	Laval Rocket	AHL	54	7	17	24	121	—	—	—	—	—
2017–18	Montreal Canadiens	NHL	18	0	1	1	32	—	—	—	—	—
2018–19	Laval Rocket	AHL	32	7	14	21	46	—	—	—	—	—
2019–20	Laval Rocket	AHL	29	5	9	14	50	—	—	—	—	—
2019–20	Milwaukee Admirals	AHL	27	10	3	13	50	—	—	—	—	—
2020–21	Nashville Predators	NHL	6	0	0	0	16	—	—	—	—	—
2021–22	Milwaukee Admirals	AHL	14	3	3	6	15	—	—	—	—	—
2021–22	Nashville Predators	NHL	51	7	7	14	70	2	0	0	0	2
2022–23	Nashville Predators	NHL	32	2	2	4	24	—	—	—	—	—
2022–23	Milwaukee Admirals	AHL	16	2	4	6	28	15	4	3	7	24
2023–24	Nashville Predators	NHL	70	12	10	22	100	6	0	0	0	2
2024–25	Nashville Predators	NHL	74	5	9	14	102	—	—	—	—	—
2025–26	Nashville Predators	NHL	59	5	7	12	73	—	—	—	—	—
2025–26	Minnesota Wild	NHL	20	3	2	5	20	11	2	2	4	0
NHL totals			381	36	43	79	515	20	2	2	4	4

=== International ===
Year	Team	Event	Result	GP	G	A	Pts	PIM
2012	United States	U17	2nd place, silver medalist(s)	5	1	1	2	2
2013	United States	U18	2nd place, silver medalist(s)	7	3	2	5	14
2025	United States	WC	1st place, gold medalist(s)	10	1	1	2	2
Junior totals				12	4	3	7	16
Senior totals				10	1	1	2	2

== Awards and honors ==
Award	Year	Ref
OHL
J. Ross Robertson Cup champion	2015	
CHL
Memorial Cup champion	2015	
Memorial Cup All-Star Team	2015	
AHL
AHL All-Star Classic	2016	

Awards and achievements
Preceded by Alex Galchenyuk	Montreal Canadiens first-round draft pick 2013	Succeeded by Nikita Scherbak
