= Nick Cousins =

Canadian ice hockey player (born 1993)

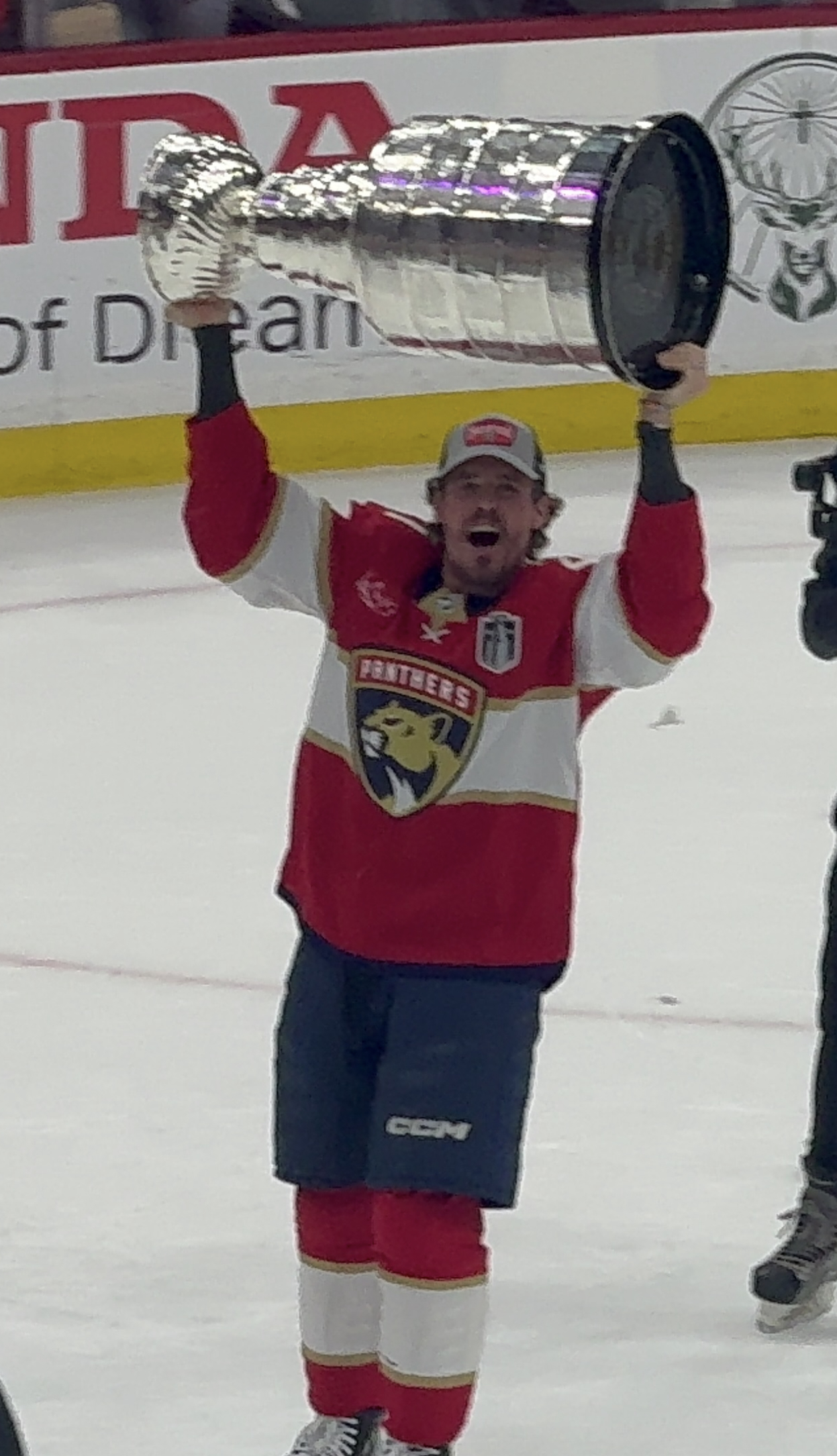
- Cousins with the Stanley Cup in 2024
- Born: July 20, 1993 (age 33) Belleville, Ontario, Canada
- Height: 5 ft 11 in (180 cm)
- Weight: 185 lb (84 kg; 13 st 3 lb)
- Position: Centre
- Shoots: Left
- NHL team Former teams: Ottawa Senators; Philadelphia Flyers; Arizona Coyotes; Montreal Canadiens; Vegas Golden Knights; Nashville Predators; Florida Panthers
- NHL draft: 68th overall, 2011; Philadelphia Flyers
- Playing career: 2012–present

Brian Nicholas Cousins (born July 20, 1993) is a Canadian professional ice hockey player who is a centre for the Ottawa Senators of the National Hockey League (NHL). He was selected in the third round, 68th overall, by the Philadelphia Flyers in the 2011 NHL entry draft. Cousins has also previously played for the Florida Panthers, Arizona Coyotes, Montreal Canadiens, Vegas Golden Knights, and Nashville Predators. Cousins won the Stanley Cup with the Panthers in 2024.

== Playing career ==
=== Amateur ===
Cousins played four seasons (2009–2013) of major junior hockey with the Sault Ste. Marie Greyhounds of the Ontario Hockey League (OHL). While with the Greyhounds, he improved each season, with 27 goals, 76 assists and 103 points in 64 games in his final season. He was leading the league in scoring when he was suspended for four games after making an illegal check from behind in a game against the London Knights in February 2013. He finished his OHL career scoring 102 goals and 189 assists for 291 points, while earning 261 penalty minutes in 264 games played.

=== Professional ===
==== Philadelphia Flyers ====
Cousins was selected by the Philadelphia Flyers of the National Hockey League (NHL) in the third round, 68th overall, of the 2011 NHL entry draft. On March 26, 2012, Cousins was signed to a three-year, entry-level contract by the Philadelphia Flyers. After the Greyhounds suffered an early playoff exit in 2013, Cousins joined the Flyers' American Hockey League (AHL) affiliate, the Adirondack Phantoms, for seven games, registering just one assist on an amateur tryout contract. Cousins was assigned to Adirondack in September 2013 and spent the entire 2013–14 season with the Phantoms, scoring 11 goals and 29 points in 74 games.

In 2014, Cousins was assigned to Philadelphia's new AHL affiliate, the Lehigh Valley Phantoms, and scored in the team's first ever game. He was called up during the 2014–15 season to the Flyers. On March 17, 2015, Cousins made his NHL debut in a 4–1 loss to the Vancouver Canucks. He appeared in 11 games for the Flyers, going scoreless and in 64 games with Lehigh Valley, registering 22 goals and 56 points. Cousins split the 2015–16 season between the Phantoms and Flyers. In January 2016 Cousins and goaltender Anthony Stolarz were named to the 2016 AHL All-Star Classic as Lehigh Valley's representatives. He was recalled by Philadelphia in February to replace an injured Sean Couturier, slotting in his spot between Brayden Schenn and Sam Gagner. He registered his first NHL point assisting on Michael Del Zotto's first period goal in a 3–2 loss to the Washington Capitals on February 7. On February 11, Cousins scored his first NHL goal on goaltender Robin Lehner in a 5–1 victory over the Buffalo Sabres. He also assisted on Michael Raffl's goal, earning two points on the night. He appeared in 38 games with Lehigh Valley, scoring 12 goals and 38 points. With the Flyers he registered 6 goals and 11 points in 36 games. He made his playoffs debut in the first round matchup of the 2016 Stanley Cup playoffs versus the Washington Capitals. He played in all six games, but went scoreless as the Flyers were eliminated. In the offseason, as a restricted free agent, he accepted his qualifying offer, tying him to the Flyers for another season. In the 2016–17 season, Cousins played the full season with the Flyers, scoring six goals and 16 points in 60 games.

==== Arizona Coyotes ====
On June 16, 2017, Cousins' five-year tenure with the Flyers organization ended as he was traded alongside goaltender Merrick Madsen to the Arizona Coyotes in exchange for forward Brendan Warren and a fifth-round choice in the 2018 NHL entry draft. A restricted free agent, he was not under contract with the Coyotes at the time of the 2017 NHL expansion draft, and was not eligible to be exposed/selected. He signed a two-year contract with Arizona on July 1. He made his Coyotes debut on October 7 versus the expansion Vegas Golden Knights. He registered his first point with the Coyotes on October 21, assisting on Christian Fischer's first period goal in a 4–2 loss to the Chicago Blackhawks. He scored his first goal for Arizona in the next game on October 24, against Jaroslav Halák in a 5–3 loss to the New York Islanders. He was fined $2,000 for embellishment by the NHL on March 9, 2018, after being warned twice during the season. In his first season with the Coyotes in 2017–18, Cousins played in 71 games, scoring 12 goals and 19 points. In establishing a bottom-six role, providing an agitating two-way presence within the Coyotes organization, Cousins recorded a career-high 27 points (7 goals, 20 assists), in 81 games in the 2018–19 season. On June 25, 2019, as an impending restricted free agent, Cousins was not tendered a qualifying offer by the Coyotes, releasing him as an unrestricted free agent.

==== Montreal Canadiens ====
On July 5, 2019, Cousins signed a one-year, $1 million contract with the Montreal Canadiens. He made his Canadiens debut on October 17 and earned his first point with the team in the game, assisting on Victor Mete's first period goal in a 4–0 shutout win over the Minnesota Wild. He registered his first goal as a Canadien against Aaron Dell in a 4–2 loss to the San Jose Sharks on October 24. On January 8, 2020, Cousins was fined $2,688.17 by the NHL for a boarding penalty he committed against Mike Green of the Detroit Red Wings on January 7. He skated in 58 games for the club, recording nine goals and 13 assists.

==== Vegas Golden Knights ====
On February 24, 2020, Montreal traded Cousins to the Vegas Golden Knights in exchange for a fourth-round selection in the 2021 NHL entry draft. In his debut game with Vegas on February 26, he scored against Mikko Koskinen to become the sixth Golden Knight that season to score in their first game with the team. Only two weeks after the trade was finalized, the NHL season was suspended indefinitely due to the COVID-19 pandemic. During the pause, Cousins returned to Canada and bonded with his teammates through daily FaceTime calls and other forms of long-distance communication. When play resumed for the 2020 Stanley Cup playoffs, Cousins played in 17 playoff games, registering five assists, as the Golden Knights made it to the Western Conference finals, only to be eliminated by the Dallas Stars.

==== Nashville Predators ====
Leaving the Golden Knights as a free agent, on October 9, 2020, Cousins was signed to a two-year, $3 million contract with the Nashville Predators. He made his Predators debut in the pandemic-delayed 2020–21 season on January 14, 2021, in a 3–1 victory over the Columbus Blue Jackets. He registered his first point with the Predators in the next game on January 16, assisting on Luke Kunin's third period goal in a 5–2 victory over the Blue Jackets. He scored his first goal as a Predator against Kevin Lankinen in a 2–1 victory over the Chicago Blackhawks on January 27. He finished the season with 5 goals and 18 points in 52 games. Nashville faced the Carolina Hurricanes in the first round of the 2021 Stanley Cup playoffs. He was scratched from the lineup for the first two games of the series, but made his first appearance in the May 21 Predators' double overtime 5–4 victory. He scored his first career NHL playoff goal on Alex Nedeljkovic in the following game on May 23, a double overtime 4–3 win against Carolina, tying the series at two wins apiece. However, Carolina won the next two games, eliminating the Predators.

In his second season with Nashville in 2021–22, Cousins appeared in 68 games, scoring nine goals and 22 points. He missed time in November 2021 with an undisclosed injury that put him on injured reserve, and missed time again in February 2022 with a lower body injury. The Predators made the 2022 Stanley Cup playoffs and faced the Colorado Avalanche in the first round. Cousins appeared in three games, going scoreless. He played in the first two games of the series, was scratched for the third, before re-entering the lineup for the fourth game as the Predators were swept by the Avalanche in four games.

==== Florida Panthers ====
Having concluded his contract with the Predators, Cousins joined his sixth NHL club, in signing as a free agent to a two-year, $2.2 million contract with the Florida Panthers on July 13, 2022. He made his Panthers debut on October 13, 2022, in the season-opening 3–1 over the New York Islanders. He registered his first point with the Panthers on November 6, assisting on Eetu Luostarinen's third period goal in a 5–4 loss to the Los Angeles Kings. He scored his first goal with Florida, a game winner, two games later on November 9 against Antti Raanta in a 3–0 shutout win over the Carolina Hurricanes. He finished the season with 9 goals and 27 points in 81 games. The Panthers made the 2023 Stanley Cup playoffs and Cousins appeared in every game for the Panthers during their run, scoring 2 goals and 7 points in 21 games. On May 12 he scored the series-winning goal in overtime of game five against the Toronto Maple Leafs, sending the Panthers to their first Conference Final since 1996. The Panthers eliminated the Hurricanes in four games, to set up a Stanley Cup Final with the Vegas Golden Knights. In the final, the Panthers were defeated by the Golden Knights.

In his second season with the Panthers in 2023–24, Cousins was involved in a series of questionable hits that led to retaliation by players on the opposing teams. On December 10, 2023, in a game against Columbus, Cousins hit defenceman Erik Gudbranson while the defenceman was in a vulnerable position along the boards. Cousins received a minor boarding penalty for the play, but Gudbranson was incensed. Gudbranson later returned to the ice and went after Cousins in retaliation, punching him. For the retaliation, Gudbranson was suspended one game by the NHL. The following month on January 3, Cousins was involved in another questionable hit involving a player in a vulnerable position along the boards. Arizona Coyotes defenceman Juuso Välimäki was on one knee along the boards when Cousins hit him. No penalty was called, but the Coyotes' Jason Zucker skated over and hit Cousins from behind, driving his head into the boards. Zucker then fought Gustav Forsling of the Panthers after the hit, and was given a fighting major penalty of five minutes and a game misconduct penalty. For the retaliation Zucker was suspended for three games by the NHL. Cousins received a concussion from Zucker's hit and missed 12 games. Cousins appeared in 69 games with the Panthers that season, scoring 7 goals and 15 points. The Panthers made the playoffs, and advanced again to the 2024 Cup Final, facing the Edmonton Oilers. Cousins was in and out of the lineup this time, appearing in 12 games, registering one assist. The Panthers defeated the Oilers in game seven and won the Stanley Cup for the first time in franchise history.

==== Ottawa Senators ====
After winning the Stanley Cup with the Panthers, Cousins agreed to a one-year, $800,000 contract with the Ottawa Senators on August 29, 2024. He made his Senators debut on October 10 in the team's first home game of the season, playing against his former team, the Florida Panthers. He recorded his first goal for Ottawa on October 27, scoring the team's second goal of the game in a 5–4 loss to the Colorado Avalanche. He also assisted on Brady Tkachuk's goal in the game. On January 25, 2025, during a game against the Toronto Maple Leafs, Cousins was hit knee-to-knee by Maple Leafs rookie Jacob Quillan with about 12 minutes remaining in the first period. Both players required assistance leaving the ice, with Cousins being obviously injured, requiring the support of a trainer and teammate Shane Pinto. On January 29, it was announced that Cousins would miss six to eight weeks with a knee injury. Cousins underwent surgery in early February. Cousins returned to the lineup on April 13 in a 4–3 overtime loss to the Philadelphia Flyers after missing 30 games. He finished the season with six goals and 15 points in 50 games. The Senators made the playoffs for the first time since 2017 and faced the Toronto Maple Leafs in the opening round. However, they were eliminated in six games in their best-of-seven series. In five playoff games, Cousins went scoreless.

Cousins signed a one-year, $825,000 deal on July 1, 2025, with the Ottawa Senators to return to the club for the 2025–26 season. In 81 games with Ottawa, he scored nine goals and 23 points. The Senators made the playoffs again, but were swept in the first round by the Carolina Hurricanes. Cousins added one assist in the four games. He was re-signed to a two-year, $3.175 million contract by the Senators on June 30, 2026.

== Personal life ==
While with the Greyhounds, Cousins was one of three players charged with sexual assault in August 2012. However, the charges were withdrawn in April 2013 by the Crown Attorney's Office, which, after reviewing the evidence provided, found "no reasonable prospect of conviction."

== Career statistics ==
=== Regular season and playoffs ===
			Regular season					Playoffs
Season	Team	League	GP	G	A	Pts	PIM	GP	G	A	Pts	PIM
2009–10	Sault Ste. Marie Greyhounds	OHL	67	11	21	32	34	5	0	1	1	2
2010–11	Sault Ste. Marie Greyhounds	OHL	68	29	39	68	56	—	—	—	—	—
2011–12	Sault Ste. Marie Greyhounds	OHL	65	35	53	88	88	—	—	—	—	—
2011–12	Adirondack Phantoms	AHL	1	0	0	0	0	—	—	—	—	—
2012–13	Sault Ste. Marie Greyhounds	OHL	64	27	76	103	83	6	3	3	6	12
2012–13	Adirondack Phantoms	AHL	7	0	1	1	2	—	—	—	—	—
2013–14	Adirondack Phantoms	AHL	74	11	18	29	47	—	—	—	—	—
2014–15	Lehigh Valley Phantoms	AHL	64	22	34	56	73	—	—	—	—	—
2014–15	Philadelphia Flyers	NHL	11	0	0	0	2	—	—	—	—	—
2015–16	Lehigh Valley Phantoms	AHL	38	12	26	38	45	—	—	—	—	—
2015–16	Philadelphia Flyers	NHL	36	6	5	11	4	6	0	0	0	2
2016–17	Philadelphia Flyers	NHL	60	6	10	16	31	—	—	—	—	—
2017–18	Arizona Coyotes	NHL	71	12	7	19	31	—	—	—	—	—
2018–19	Arizona Coyotes	NHL	81	7	20	27	35	—	—	—	—	—
2019–20	Montreal Canadiens	NHL	58	9	13	22	33	—	—	—	—	—
2019–20	Vegas Golden Knights	NHL	7	1	2	3	2	17	0	5	5	22
2020–21	Nashville Predators	NHL	52	5	13	18	41	4	2	0	2	2
2021–22	Nashville Predators	NHL	68	9	13	22	31	3	0	0	0	0
2022–23	Florida Panthers	NHL	79	9	18	27	38	21	2	5	7	16
2023–24	Florida Panthers	NHL	69	7	8	15	64	12	0	1	1	20
2024–25	Ottawa Senators	NHL	50	6	9	15	41	5	0	0	0	0
2025–26	Ottawa Senators	NHL	81	9	14	23	92	4	0	1	1	2
NHL totals			723	86	132	218	445	72	4	12	16	64

=== International ===
Year	Team	Event	Result	GP	G	A	Pts	PIM
2011	Canada	U18	4th	7	4	4	8	10
Junior totals				7	4	4	8	10

== Awards and honours ==
Award	Year	Ref
NHL
Stanley Cup champion	2024	
