= Match penalty =

Penalty in sports

A red card is used in several sports and most commonly indicates a serious offence and can often mean that a player has been expelled from the game. In bandy, it indicates this, which is called a match penalty.

Match penalty is a term used in some sports for a player having committed such a serious offense that they are sent off for the rest of the game. The term is used in bandy, floorball, and ice hockey.

== Bandy ==
In bandy, it is indicated with a red penalty card.

== Ice hockey ==
In ice hockey, there are two kinds of sending-off penalties: "game misconduct penalty" and the more serious or more extreme "match penalty", which is imposed for deliberately injuring or attempting to injure another player. Many other penalties automatically become match penalties if injuries actually occur: under NHL rules, "butt-ending, goalies using blocking glove to the face of another player, head-butting, kicking, punching an unsuspecting player, spearing", and "tape on hands during altercation" must be called as a match penalty if injuries occur. Under IIHF rules, match penalty used to be imposed for kneeing and "checking to the head or neck area" if injuries occurred; since the 2023/24 edition of IIHF rules, match penalty has been removed from the rules and a major penalty with a game misconduct penalty should be imposed for dangerous actions.
