= Charging (ice hockey) =

Penalty in ice hockey

Charging is a penalty in ice hockey.

Rule 42 of the NHL rulebook dictates that:

A minor or major penalty shall be imposed on a player who skates, jumps into or charges an opponent in any manner.

Charging shall mean the actions of a player who, as a result of distance traveled, shall violently check an opponent in any manner.

A 'charge' is generally the result of attempting to hit an opposing player beyond what is called for with a typical hockey body check. This is based on the speed of the offending player, how the attacker propels themselves into the hit, or if they are targeting the goaltender.

The infraction may warrant any severity of penalty or combination of penalties as the officials deem fit, including a major plus a game misconduct, or suspension if the infraction results in injury to the opposing player.
