= Cross-checking =

Infraction in the sport of ice hockey

Cross-checking is an infraction in the sport of ice hockey, ringette, and lacrosse where a player checks an opponent by using the shaft of their stick with both hands. This article deals chiefly with ice hockey.

In the rules of the National Hockey League, cross-checking is defined in Rule 59, while the International Ice Hockey Federation rules define it in Rule 127.

While body checking is allowed in boys and men's ice hockey, the use of the stick increases the risk of injury to an opponent. The most common penalty is a two-minute minor, served by the offender. However under certain circumstances the referee may assess a major penalty (plus an automatic game misconduct) or a match penalty if the action is judged to be an attempt to injure the player. Usually, if the cross-check causes an injury the league itself may look into whether extra punishment is required for the player that delivered the check. In women's ice hockey body checking is allowed in the Professional Women's Hockey League and the Swedish Women's Hockey League; however other leagues do not allow it, and all leagues ban cross checking.

International ice hockey rules and league rules though slightly different lay out the foundation of penalties for cross-checking. While the differences happen to be subtle in the context of international hockey events such as the Winter Olympics and the World Ice Hockey Championships, the penalties tend to be stricter than those from the NHL, KHL and the minor leagues. Generally, the severity of the penalty depends on the referees' judgment as to the severity and intent of the cross-check.

The penalty is generally assessed by the referee that is on ice and is up to their judgment to decide whether the penalty was a cross-check or something else. For example, at the 2014 Sochi Olympics Women's Gold Medal Game between Canada and USA, Hilary Knight of the USA team was assessed a cross-checking penalty on Canada forward Hayley Wickenheiser. The call caused uproar from both benches, while the Canada bench thought it was tripping and there should have been a penalty shot, the USA bench felt that it was not a cross check. The discretion of the referee decides whether or not a cross-check is to be called.

== International Ice Hockey Federation (IIHF) ==
A cross-check is defined by the International Ice Hockey Federation (IIHF) in their Rule 127 as "check to the body of an opponent with both hands on the stick and no part of the stick on the ice". IIHF states that at least a minor penalty will be assessed, and a major (with automatic game misconduct) or match penalty will be assessed if the player injures or recklessly endangers the opponent.

== National Hockey League (NHL) ==
The NHL defines a cross check in their Rule 59 as "The action of using the shaft of the stick between the two hands to forcefully check an opponent". Within the context of the NHL, the referee again decides what the severity of the cross-check was and how the penalty shall be served; the referee may impose a minor penalty, major penalty with an automatic game misconduct, or a match penalty. If a major penalty is assessed for the cross-check, an automatic fine of $100 is assessed as well as misconduct is imposed as well. A match penalty is assessed for a cross-check if the referee feels that the offender aimed to deliberately hurt or injure the opponent. While a major penalty is rarely assessed unless the victim is seriously injured, the nature of a cross-check, that is, using the part of the stick between two hands, means cross-checking is almost always particularly painful. The Commissioner may also place more fines or suspensions on the player if deemed appropriate. As an example, after a game between the Vancouver Canucks & Edmonton Oilers on 18 January 2025, Edmonton's Connor McDavid and Vancouver's Tyler Myers were both given a match penalty for cross-checks on an opponent. Days later they were suspended 3 games by the NHL. Each received a higher than usual penalty due to their history of suspensions and fines.

== Professional Women's Hockey League (PWHL) ==
The PWHL defines a cross check in rule 60 as "The action of using the shaft of the stick between the two hands to forcefully check an opponent." The referee may impose a minor, major, or match penalty depending on severity of the infraction and the Hockey Operations Officer may impose additional penalties including a fine or suspension for cross checking.
