= High-sticking =

Infraction in ice hockey

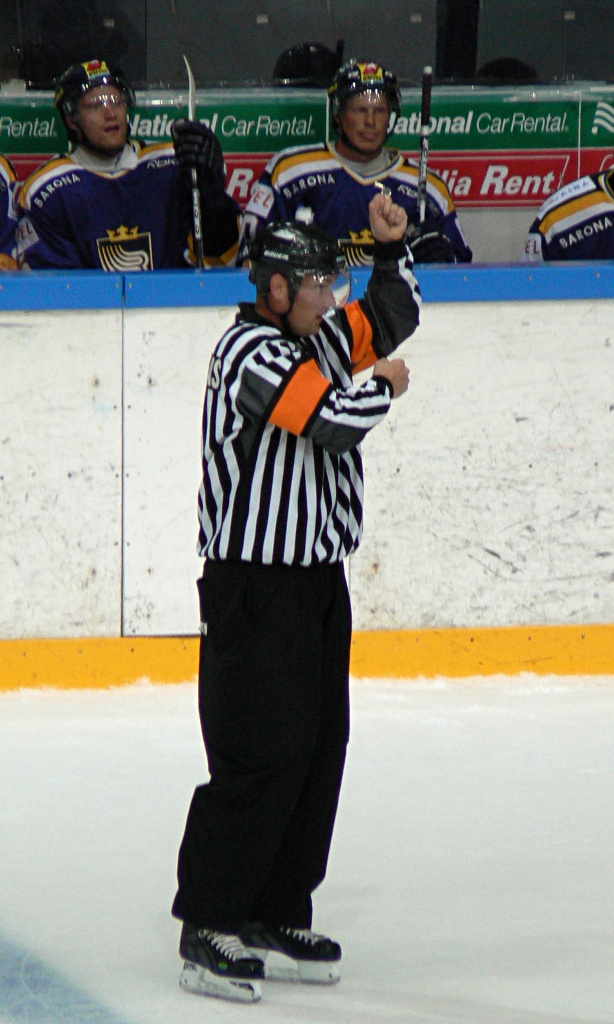
A referee calling a high-sticking penalty

High-sticking refers to three infractions in the sport of ice hockey.

As a non-penalty foul, high-sticking is defined in Rule 80 of the rules of the National Hockey League. It may occur when a player intentionally or inadvertently plays the puck with their stick above the height of the shoulders or the crossbar of a hockey goal. This can result in a stoppage of play.

As a penalty, high-sticking is defined in Rule 60 of the rules of the National Hockey League. It may occur when a player hits an opponent's head, face, or neck with their stick in an action judged not to be the result of normal play.

== When scoring a goal ==
If the puck goes into the opposing net after coming into contact with a high stick, the goal is disallowed. However, if a player knocks the puck into their own net with a high stick, the goal is allowed. In this context, the stick is high if the point of contact with the puck is higher than the crossbar of the goal.

== Non-penalty foul ==
If a high stick comes in contact with the puck and the team that touched it regains control of the puck, then play stops and a face-off takes place in a disadvantageous position to the offending team. However, if a high stick comes in contact with the puck and the puck is next touched by the opposing team, play continues. In this context, the stick is high if it is above its holder's shoulders.

== Penalty ==
It is a high-sticking penalty if a player strikes an opponent with a high stick as part of an action that is not "committed as a normal windup or follow through of a shooting motion, or accidental contact on the opposing center who is bent over during a face-off." In this context, the stick is high if it is above the shoulders of the player it strikes.

High-sticking is a minor penalty, except:

1. If the player hit is injured "in the manner of drawing blood or otherwise", then the guilty player can be assessed a double-minor penalty. Referees can review a high-sticking double minor penalty to confirm that the correct call was made.
2. If a referee judges that a player has deliberately attempted to injure an opponent by high-sticking, then that player can be assessed a match penalty (ejected) for high-sticking—whether or not the player did injure the opponent.
