= Roughing =

Penalty in ice hockey

Roughing is an offense and penalty in ice hockey when two players are in a minor altercation. The incident would have to be minor for either player to be categorized as such an offense, for instance:

- A player striking another opponent
- A goalie using their equipment to punch an opponent

== Other sports usage ==
In broader sports terminology it is also used in penalty calls given in American, or gridiron football, although the calls usually include the position against which the infraction was committed.

- Roughing the passer, when the quarterback is hit and the hit is deemed to be intentional and not the result of incidental or unavoidable contact.
- Roughing the kicker, when a kicker is intentionally hit well after the ball has been kicked away.
