= Tripping (ice hockey) =

Infraction in ice hockey

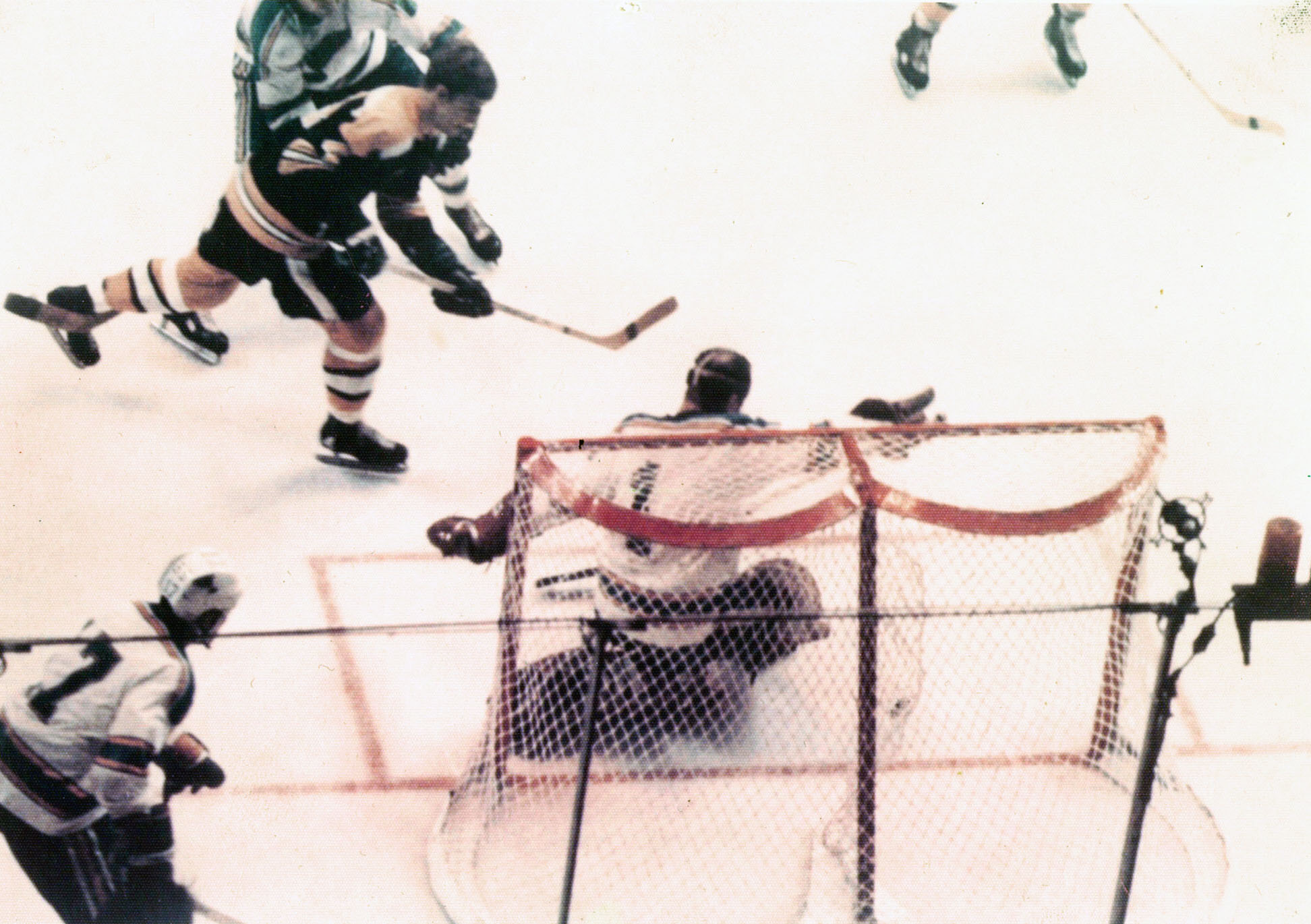
Bobby Orr (dark uniform) being tripped by the stick of an opponent (upper left)

A tripping or obstruction tripping penalty in ice hockey and ringette is called by the referee when a player trips an opposing player with their hockey stick or ringette stick, or uses their skate against the other player's skate ("slew footing"), causing them to lose balance or fall and obstruct them from making their desired play. This article deals chiefly with ice hockey.

A tripping call usually results in a two-minute minor penalty on the player that caused the infraction. However, if the player is called for slew-footing, they can be assessed a match penalty at the official's discretion. If the player was tripped on a breakaway (with no opponents to pass other than the goaltender), a tripping call may instead result in a penalty shot for the tripped player.

== See also ==
- Penalty (ice hockey)
