= Boarding (ice hockey) =

Penalty in ice hockey

Boarding in ice hockey is a penalty called when an offending player pushes, trips or checks an opposing player violently into the boards (walls) of the hockey rink.

In ice hockey, the boarding call is often a major penalty due to the likelihood of injury sustained by the player who was boarded, and officials have the discretion to call a game misconduct or a match penalty (if they feel the offense was a deliberate attempt to injure) on the offending player. However, in the North American professional ice hockey league, the NHL, if a major penalty is assessed and the boarded player sustains a head or facial injury, the offending player receives an automatic game misconduct. If no injury is sustained, then a minor penalty will be called. In college ice hockey, the player does not need to be injured for it to be a major penalty. Boarding is usually assessed against a player when the opposing player is hit 4–5 feet away from the boards and hits one's head against the boards on the way down.

== See also ==
- Checking (ice hockey)

== Sources ==
- NHL Video Rulebook entry on boarding
