= Diving (ice hockey) =

Penalty for embellishing an infraction

In ice hockey, diving (also called embellishment or flopping) is an infraction that occurs when a player tries to get the attention of the referee by embellishing an infraction from an opposing player in an attempt to draw a penalty. Usually, when diving is called, a player from each team receives a penalty, one for diving and the other for the initial infraction, but this is not required.

== NHL ==
In the National Hockey League (NHL), any player called for diving will receive a 2-minute minor penalty for the infraction.

Players who dive, as well as the coaches of the diving players, may also be additionally fined or cited by the league as supplemental discipline for diving.

NHL fines for diving/embellishment
Incident number^{1}	Player fine^{2}	Coach fine^{2}
1	Warning^{3} (N/A)	Warning^{3} (N/A)
2	$2,000	N/A
3	$3,000	N/A
4	$4,000	N/A
5	$5,000	$2,000
6	$5,000	$3,000
7	$5,000	$4,000
8+	$5,000	$5,000

1. For coach incident totals, each citation issued to a player on his club counts toward his total.
2. All figures are in US dollars.
3. Fines only handed out after non-publicized warnings are given to the player/coach for their first offense.

== See also ==
- Diving (association football)
- Flop (basketball)
