= 2019–20 NHL suspensions and fines =

List of ice hockey punishments

The following is a list of all suspensions and fines enforced in the National Hockey League (NHL) during the 2019–20 NHL season. It lists which players or coaches of what team have been punished for which offense and the amount of punishment they have received.

Based on each player's average annual salary, divided by number of days in the season (186) for non-repeat offenders and games (82) for repeat offenders, salary will be forfeited for the term of their suspension. Players' money forfeited due to suspension or fine goes to the Players' Emergency Assistance Fund, while money forfeited by coaches, staff or organizations as a whole go to the NHL Foundation.

== Suspensions ==
^{†} - suspension covered at least one 2019 NHL preseason game
^{‡} - suspension covered at least one 2020 postseason game
^{#} - suspension was later reduced upon further review/successful appeal; information presented in italics
^{R} - Player was considered a repeat offender under the terms of the Collective Bargaining Agreement (player had been suspended in the 18 months prior to this suspension)

Date of incident	Offender	Team(s)	Offense(s)	Date of action	Length	Salary forfeited^{1}^{,}^{2}
October 19, 2014	Slava Voynov	Los Angeles Kings	Unacceptable off-ice conduct.	April 9, 2019^{3} May 23, 2019^{4}	82 games + playoffs^{‡#} 41 games^{†}^{4}	N/A^{2}^{,}^{5}
September 9, 2019	Evgeny Kuznetsov	Washington Capitals	Inappropriate conduct.	September 14, 2019	3 games	$180,645.16^{2}
September 29, 2019	Evander Kane^{R}	San Jose Sharks	Physical abuse of officials. (Slashing Linesman Kiel Murchison)	October 1, 2019	3 games	$256,097.56
October 17, 2019	Valentin Zykov	Vegas Golden Knights	Violating the terms of the NHL/NHLPA Performance Enhancing Substances Program.^{6}	October 17, 2019	20 games	$152,419.35^{2}
October 26, 2019	Adam Lowry^{R}	Winnipeg Jets	Boarding Oliver Kylington.	October 28, 2019	2 games	$71,138.22
November 2, 2019	Milan Lucic	Calgary Flames	Roughing Kole Sherwood.	November 3, 2019	2 games	$64,516.13
November 9, 2019	Nick Foligno	Columbus Blue Jackets	Elbowing Pierre-Edouard Bellemare.	November 11, 2019	3 games	$88,709.67
November 18, 2019	Garnet Hathaway	Washington Capitals	Spitting at Erik Gudbranson.	November 20, 2019	3 games	$24,193.55
November 23, 2019	Robert Bortuzzo^{R}	St. Louis Blues	Cross-checking Viktor Arvidsson.	November 24, 2019	4 games	$67,073.17
November 23, 2019	Alexander Kerfoot	Toronto Maple Leafs	Boarding Erik Johnson.	November 25, 2019	2 games	$37,634.41
November 25, 2019	Erik Cernak	Tampa Bay Lightning	Elbowing Rasmus Dahlin.	November 26, 2019	2 games	$7,500.00
December 15, 2019	Joel Farabee	Philadelphia Flyers	Interference against Mathieu Perreault.	December 16, 2019	3 games	$14,919.35
December 31, 2019	Kurtis MacDermid	Los Angeles Kings	Illegal check to the head of Ivan Provorov.	January 3, 2020	2 games	$7,258.06
January 1, 2020	Corey Perry	Dallas Stars	Elbowing Ryan Ellis.	January 3, 2020	5 games	$40,322.58
January 11, 2020	Zack Kassian	Edmonton Oilers	Serving as the aggressor in an altercation with Matthew Tkachuk.	January 13, 2020	2 games	$20,967.74
January 25, 2020	Alexander Ovechkin	Washington Capitals	Automatic suspension for missing NHL All-Star Game.	December 27, 2019	1 game	$53,763.44^{2}
January 25, 2020	Marc-Andre Fleury	Vegas Golden Knights	Automatic suspension for missing NHL All-Star Game.	January 4, 2020	1 game	$45,698.92^{2}
January 25, 2020	Tuukka Rask	Boston Bruins	Automatic suspension for missing NHL All-Star Game.	January 13, 2020	1 game	$34,946.24^{2}
February 8, 2020	Jeremy Lauzon	Boston Bruins	Illegal check to the head of Derek Stepan.	February 9, 2020	2 games	$8,037.63
February 13, 2020	Zack Kassian^{R}	Edmonton Oilers	Kicking Erik Cernak.	February 14, 2020	7 games	$166,463.41
February 14, 2020	Evander Kane^{R}	San Jose Sharks	Elbowing Neal Pionk.	February 15, 2020	3 games	$256,097.56
March 11, 2020	Brendan Lemieux^{R}	New York Rangers	Interference against Joonas Donskoi.	July 20, 2020^{7}	2 games^{‡}	N/A
August 1, 2020	Drake Caggiula	Chicago Blackhawks	Illegal check to the head of Tyler Ennis.	August 2, 2020	1 game^{‡}	N/A
August 19, 2020	Matt Niskanen	Philadelphia Flyers	Cross-checking Brendan Gallagher.	August 20, 2020	1 game^{‡}	N/A
September 4, 2020	Ryan Reaves	Vegas Golden Knights	Illegal check to the head of Tyler Motte.	September 5, 2020	1 game^{‡}	N/A
September 9, 2020	Alex Killorn	Tampa Bay Lightning	Boarding Brock Nelson.	September 10, 2020	1 game^{‡}	N/A
Player totals:					118 games^{‡} (112 regular + 6 postseason)	$1,598,402.15

=== Notes ===
1. All figures are in US dollars.
2. Fines generated for games lost due to suspension for off-ice conduct are calculated uniquely and irrespective of repeat offender status.
3. Voynov was previously suspended indefinitely on October 20, 2014, for his actions.
4. Voynov and the NHLPA appealed the suspension to a neutral arbitrator on April 20, 2019. On May 23, 2019, NHL/NHLPA Neutral Discipline Arbitrator, Shyam Das, upheld NHL Commissioner Gary Bettman's one-season (one-year) suspension, but the neutral arbitrator ruled that Voynov should be credited with having already served 41 games of his suspension during the 2018–19 NHL season. Accordingly, the suspension will remain in effect until 41 games of the 2019–20 NHL season have been served.
5. Voynov did not have an active contract at the time of this ruling, and therefore did not forfeit any salary due to games lost.
6. Suspension accompanied by mandatory referral to the NHL/NHLPA Program for Substance Abuse and Behavioral Health.
7. The precise parameters of Lemieux's suspension were originally delayed due to the suspension of the regular season due to COVID-19.

== Fines ==
Players can be fined up to 50% of one day's salary, up to a maximum of $10,000.00 for their first offense, and $15,000.00 for any subsequent offenses (player had been fined in the 12 months prior to this fine). Coaches, non-playing personnel, and teams are not restricted to such maximums, though can still be treated as repeat offenders.

Fines for players/coaches fined for diving/embellishment are structured uniquely and are only handed out after non-publicized warnings are given to the player/coach for their first offense. For more details on diving/embellishment fines:

Diving/embellishment specifications
Incident Number^{1}	Player Fine^{2}	Coach Fine^{2}
1	Warning (N/A)	Warning (N/A)
2	$2,000	N/A
3	$3,000	N/A
4	$4,000	N/A
5	$5,000	$2,000
6	$5,000	$3,000
7	$5,000	$4,000
8+	$5,000	$5,000

1. For coach incident totals, each citation issued to a player on his club counts toward his total.
2. All figures are in US dollars.

Fines listed in italics indicate that was the maximum allowed fine.

Date of incident	Offender	Team	Offense	Date of action	Amount^{1}
September 26, 2019	Cedric Paquette	Tampa Bay Lightning	High-sticking Frank Vatrano.	September 27, 2019	$2,500.00
October 16, 2019	Nick Ritchie	Anaheim Ducks	Roughing Vladimir Sobotka.	October 17, 2019	$4,029.37
October 17, 2019	Darren Helm	Detroit Red Wings	Slashing Elias Lindholm.	October 18, 2019	$5,000.00
November 16, 2019	Oskar Sundqvist	St. Louis Blues	Charging John Gibson.	November 17, 2019	$7,392.47
December 3, 2019	Ryan Johansen	Nashville Predators	Elbowing Brayden Point.	December 4, 2019	$5,000.00
December 3, 2019	Evander Kane	San Jose Sharks	Elbowing Radko Gudas.	December 4, 2019	$5,000.00
December 7, 2019	Brady Tkachuk	Ottawa Senators	Cross-checking Scott Laughton.	December 7, 2019	$2,486.56
December 8, 2019	Brendan Lemieux	New York Rangers	Elbowing Cody Glass.	December 9, 2019	$2,486.56
December 18, 2019	Samuel Girard	Colorado Avalanche	Boarding Alex DeBrincat.	December 19, 2019	$1,957.88
December 21, 2019	Robby Fabbri	Detroit Red Wings	Spearing Alexander Kerfoot.	December 22, 2019	$2,419.35
December 30, 2019	Jean-Gabriel Pageau	Ottawa Senators	Roughing Evgeni Malkin.	December 31, 2019	$2,500.00
December 30, 2019	Evgeni Malkin	Pittsburgh Penguins	High-sticking Jean-Gabriel Pageau.	December 31, 2019	$5,000.00
December 21, 2019	Alex Stalock	Minnesota Wild	Diving/Embellishment (second citation).^{2}	January 1, 2020	$2,000.00
December 29, 2019	John Tortorella (head coach)	Columbus Blue Jackets	Inappropriate comments against officials during a postgame press conference.^{3}	January 1, 2020	$20,000.00
January 7, 2020	Nick Cousins	Montreal Canadiens	Boarding Mike Green.	January 8, 2020	$2,688.17
January 11, 2020	Jacob Trouba	New York Rangers	Slashing Vince Dunn.	January 12, 2020	$5,000.00
January 7, 2020	Viktor Arvidsson	Nashville Predators	Diving/Embellishment (second citation).^{4}	January 17, 2020	$2,000.00
January 16, 2020	Ryan Lindgren	New York Rangers	Interference against Jordan Eberle.	January 17, 2020	$2,486.56
February 10, 2020	Antoine Roussel	Vancouver Canucks	Slashing Yannick Weber.	February 11, 2020	$5,000.00
February 11, 2020	Matt Dumba	Minnesota Wild	Slashing Ryan Reaves.	February 12, 2020	$5,000.00
February 12, 2020	Zdeno Chara	Boston Bruins	Cross-checking Brendan Gallagher.	February 13, 2020	$5,000.00
February 15, 2020	Claude Julien (head coach)	Montreal Canadiens	Inappropriate comments against officials during a postgame press conference.	February 17, 2020	$10,000.00
February 20, 2020	Matt Niskanen	Philadelphia Flyers	Slashing Gustav Nyquist.	February 21, 2020	$5,000.00
February 20, 2020	Scott Sabourin	Ottawa Senators	Unsportsmanlike conduct against Mark Scheifele.	February 21, 2020	$1,881.72
February 25, 2020	John Hayden	New Jersey Devils	Cross-checking Tyler Bertuzzi.	February 26, 2020	$2,016.13
March 7, 2020	Roman Josi	Nashville Predators	Cross-checking Corey Perry.	March 8, 2020	$5,000.00
March 8, 2020	Oskar Sundqvist	St. Louis Blues	Roughing Adam Boqvist.	March 9, 2020	$5,000.00
August 2, 2020	Micheal Ferland	Vancouver Canucks	Spearing Ryan Hartman.	August 3, 2020	$5,000.00
August 2, 2020	Luke Kunin	Minnesota Wild	Unsportsmanlike conduct against Micheal Ferland.	August 3, 2020	$1,000.00
August 4, 2020	Mike Matheson	Florida Panthers	High-sticking Brock Nelson.	August 4, 2020	$2,500.00
August 12, 2020	Rod Brind'Amour (head coach)	Carolina Hurricanes	Inappropriate comments against officials during a postgame press conference.^{5}	August 12, 2020	$25,000.00
August 16, 2020	Max Pacioretty	Vegas Golden Knights	Slashing Alex DeBrincat.	August 16, 2020	$2,500.00
August 19, 2020	John Tortorella^{R} (head coach)	Columbus Blue Jackets	Inappropriate comments against officials during a postgame press conference.^{6}	August 25, 2020	$25,000.00
August 6, 2020	Team	Arizona Coyotes	Violating the NHL's Combine Testing Policy.	August 26, 2020	N/A^{7}
Totals:					$184,844.77

=== Notes ===
1. All figures are in US dollars.
2. Stalock was issued his first citation following an incident on October 12, 2019.
3. Tortorella was also assessed a conditional fine of $25,000 that would be assessed if he committed a second violation prior to December 29, 2020.
4. Arvidsson was issued his first citation following an incident on December 27, 2019.
5. Brind'Amour was also assessed a conditional fine of $25,000 that would be assessed if he committed a second violation prior to August 12, 2021.
6. This fine is the collection of a conditional fine assessed January 1, 2020.^{3}
7. Arizona was forced to forfeit the club's 2nd-round pick in the 2020 NHL Draft and 1st-round pick in the 2021 NHL Draft in lieu of a cash fine.

== See also ==
- 2018–19 NHL suspensions and fines
- 2020–21 NHL suspensions and fines
- 2019 in sports
- 2020 in sports
- 2019–20 NHL season
- 2019–20 NHL transactions
