= 2018–19 NHL suspensions and fines =

The following is a list of all suspensions and fines enforced in the National Hockey League (NHL) during the 2018–19 NHL season. It lists which players or coaches of what team have been punished for which offense and the amount of punishment they have received.

Based on each player's average annual salary, divided by number of days in the season (186) for non-repeat offenders and games (82) for repeat offenders, salary will be forfeited for the term of their suspension. Players' money forfeited due to suspension or fine goes to the Players' Emergency Assistance Fund, while money forfeited by coaches, staff or organizations as a whole go to the NHL Foundation.

== Suspensions ==
^{†} - suspension covered at least one 2018 NHL preseason game
^{‡} - suspension covered at least one 2019 postseason game
^{#} - Suspension was later reduced upon further review/successful appeal; information presented in italics
^{R} - Player was considered a repeat offender under the terms of the Collective Bargaining Agreement (player had been suspended in the 18 months prior to this suspension)

Date of incident	Offender	Team(s)	Offense(s)	Date of action	Length	Salary forfeited^{1}
September 2, 2018	Nate Schmidt	Vegas Golden Knights	Violating the terms of the NHL/NHLPA Performance Enhancing Substances Program.	September 2, 2018	27 games^{†} (7 preseason + 20 regular)	$466,532.26^{2}^{,}^{3}^{,}^{4}
September 7, 2018	Austin Watson	Nashville Predators	Unacceptable off-ice conduct.	September 12, 2018; October 12, 2018	33 games^{†#} (6 preseason + 27 regular); 24 games^{5}^{†} (6 preseason + 18 regular)	$354,838.71^{2}^{,}^{3} $248,387.10^{2}^{,}^{3}
September 19, 2018	Max Domi	Montreal Canadiens	Roughing Aaron Ekblad.	September 20, 2018	5 games^{†} (5 preseason)	N/A^{2}
September 25, 2018	Robert Bortuzzo	St. Louis Blues	Elbowing Michal Kempny.	September 27, 2018	3 games^{†} (2 preseason + 1 regular)	$6,182.80^{2}
September 30, 2018	Tom Wilson^{R}	Washington Capitals	Illegal check to the head of Oskar Sundqvist.	October 3, 2018; November 13, 2018	20 games^{#} 14 games^{6}	$1,260,162.60 $882,113.71
October 13, 2018	Mike Matheson	Florida Panthers	Interference and unsportsmanlike conduct against Elias Pettersson.	October 15, 2018	2 games	$52,419.35
October 23, 2018	Mark Borowiecki	Ottawa Senators	Elbowing Urho Vaakanainen.	October 24, 2018	1 game	$6,451.61
October 28, 2018	Mark Borowiecki^{R}	Ottawa Senators	Illegal check to the head of Cody Eakin.	October 29, 2018	3 games	$43,902.44
November 2, 2018	Brendan Lemieux	Winnipeg Jets	Illegal check to the head of Vincent Trocheck.	November 5, 2018	2 games	$9,023.30
November 15, 2018	Josh Archibald	Arizona Coyotes	Illegal check to the head of Ryan Hartman.	November 17, 2018	2 games	$7,258.06
December 2, 2018	Tyler Bertuzzi	Detroit Red Wings	Roughing and unsportsmanlike conduct against Matt Calvert.	December 3, 2018	2 games	$15,053.76
December 6, 2018	Mark Giordano	Calgary Flames	Kneeing Mikko Koivu.	December 7, 2018	2 games	$72,580.64
December 6, 2018	Ryan Lomberg	Calgary Flames	Automatic suspension for instigating in the final five minutes of regulation and leaving the bench on a legal line change for the purpose of starting a fight with Matt Dumba.	December 7, 2018	2 games	$7,634.41
December 8, 2018	Zach Hyman	Toronto Maple Leafs	Interference against Charlie McAvoy.	December 9, 2018	2 games	$24,193.55
December 18, 2018	Jujhar Khaira	Edmonton Oilers	Cross-checking Vince Dunn.	December 19, 2018	2 games	$7,258.06
December 22, 2018	Erik Karlsson	San Jose Sharks	Illegal check to the head of Austin Wagner.	December 23, 2018	2 games	$69,892.47
December 27, 2018	David Backes^{R}	Boston Bruins	Illegal check to the head of Blake Coleman.	December 28, 2018	3 games	$219,512.20
January 15, 2019	Paul Byron	Montreal Canadiens	Charging MacKenzie Weegar.	January 16, 2019	3 games	$18,817.21
January 17, 2019	Ryan Johansen	Nashville Predators	High-sticking Mark Scheifele.	January 18, 2019	2 games	$86,021.51
January 26, 2019	Alexander Ovechkin	Washington Capitals	Automatic suspension for missing NHL All-Star Game.	January 2, 2019	1 game	N/A
January 26, 2019	Carey Price	Montreal Canadiens	Automatic suspension for missing NHL All-Star Game.	January 7, 2019	1 game	N/A
January 29, 2019	Austin Watson	Nashville Predators	Suspended indefinitely for violating the terms of the NHL/NHLPA Substance Abuse and Behavioral Health Program.	January 29, 2019	21 games	$289,784.95^{3}^{,}^{7}
February 11, 2019	Evgeni Malkin	Pittsburgh Penguins	High-sticking Michael Raffl.	February 12, 2019	1 game	$51,075.27
February 19, 2019	Radko Gudas^{R}	Philadelphia Flyers	High-sticking Nikita Kucherov.	February 20, 2019	2 games	$81,707.32
February 21, 2019	Connor McDavid	Edmonton Oilers	Illegal check to the head of Nick Leddy.	February 22, 2019	2 games	$134,408.60
March 1, 2019	Kurtis Gabriel	New Jersey Devils	Boarding Nolan Patrick.	March 2, 2019	1 game	$3,494.62
March 1, 2019	Adam Lowry	Winnipeg Jets	High-sticking Filip Forsberg.	March 2, 2019	2 games	$31,362.00
March 9, 2019	Jakub Voracek	Philadelphia Flyers	Interference against Johnny Boychuk.	March 10, 2019	2 games^{8}	$88,709.68
March 9, 2019	Jack Eichel	Buffalo Sabres	Illegal check to the head of Carl Soderberg.	March 10, 2019	2 games	$107,526.88
March 20, 2019	Jean-Gabriel Pageau	Ottawa Senators	Boarding Ashton Sautner.	March 21, 2019	1 game	$16,666.67
March 21, 2019	Yanni Gourde	Tampa Bay Lightning	Illegal check to the head of Jordan Staal.	March 22, 2019	2 games	$10,752.69
April 12, 2019	Nikita Kucherov	Tampa Bay Lightning	Boarding Markus Nutivaara.	April 13, 2019	1 game^{‡} (1 postseason)	N/A^{2}
April 13, 2019	Nazem Kadri^{R}	Toronto Maple Leafs	Cross-checking Jake DeBrusk.	April 15, 2019	5 games^{‡} (5 postseason)^{9}	N/A^{2}
April 14, 2019	Joe Thornton	San Jose Sharks	Illegal check to the head of Tomas Nosek.	April 15, 2019	1 game^{‡} (1 postseason)	N/A^{2}
May 6, 2019	Charlie McAvoy	Boston Bruins	Illegal check to the head of Josh Anderson.	May 7, 2019	1 game^{‡} (1 postseason)	N/A^{2}
May 29, 2019	Oskar Sundqvist	St. Louis Blues	Boarding Matt Grzelcyk.	May 30, 2019	1 game^{‡} (1 postseason)	N/A^{2}
June 6, 2019	Ivan Barbashev	St. Louis Blues	Illegal check to the head of Marcus Johansson.	June 7, 2019	1 game^{‡} (1 postseason)	N/A^{2}
Player totals:					154 games^{†‡} (20 preseason + 124 regular + 10 postseason)	$3,051,465.07

=== Notes ===
1. All figures are in US dollars.
2. As players are not paid salary in the preseason or postseason, no fines are generated for games lost due to suspension during those periods.
3. Fines generated for games lost due to suspension for off-ice conduct are calculated uniquely and irrespective of repeat offender status.
4. Suspension accompanied by mandatory referral to the NHL/NHLPA Program for Substance Abuse and Behavioral Health.
5. Watson's original suspension was for 27 games, plus the remaining 6 games of the preseason. The suspension was appealed by Watson on September 20, 2018. On October 12, 2018, NHL/NHLPA Neutral Discipline Arbitrator, Shyam Das, overruled the NHL Commissioner Gary Bettman's 27 regular season game suspension down to 18 regular season games. The NHL and NHLPA agreed to use Das as a neutral discipline arbitrator on an ad hoc basis as regular arbitrator George Nicolau was unavailable.
6. Suspension was appealed by Wilson on October 5, 2018. On October 25, 2018, NHL Commissioner Gary Bettman announced he had heard the appeal and was upholding the original 20 game suspension levied to Wilson. The NHLPA then appealed to neutral arbitrator on behalf of Wilson, on October 26. On November 13, 2018, NHL/NHLPA Neutral Discipline Arbitrator, Shyam Das, overruled the NHL Commissioner Gary Bettman's 20 regular season game suspension down to 14 regular season games. The NHL and NHLPA agreed to use Das as a neutral discipline arbitrator on an ad hoc basis as regular arbitrator George Nicolau was unavailable. Though Wilson had already missed 16 of his originally assessed 20 games before Das' decision was made, his suspension will stand as 14 games in the NHL records and his salary was refunded for the 2 games he missed.
7. Indefinite suspension accompanied by mandatory referral to the NHL/NHLPA Program for Substance Abuse and Behavioral Health - Stage 2. Suspension completed only upon being cleared for on-ice competition by the program administrators. Watson was reinstated by the NHL/NHPLA on March 18, 2019, after 49 days and 21 games missed. As part of his reinstatement, Watson was entered into the follow-up care phase of the Substance Abuse and Behavioral Health Program.
8. Suspension was appealed by Voracek on March 11, 2019; Voracek applied for an expedited appeal, due to the short nature of the suspension. On March 13, 2019, NHL Commissioner Gary Bettman announced he had heard the appeal and was upholding the original 2 game suspension levied to Voracek. As Voracek's suspension was fewer than 6 games, per the Collective Bargaining Agreement, the Commissioner's decision was final and binding and not subject to review, and the NHLPA was not allowed to appeal to a neutral arbitrator on Voracek's behalf.
9.Nazem Kadri was suspended for the remainder of the first round of the 2019 Stanley Cup Playoffs. At the time of the suspension, the number of games for the suspension could have ranged from 3 to 5 games.

== Fines ==
Players can be fined up to 50% of one day's salary, up to a maximum of $10,000.00 for their first offense, and $15,000.00 for any subsequent offenses (player had been fined in the 12 months prior to this fine). Coaches, non-playing personnel, and teams are not restricted to such maximums.

Fines for players/coaches fined for diving/embellishment are structured uniquely and are only handed out after non-publicized warnings are given to the player/coach for their first offense. For more details on diving/embellishment fines:

Diving/embellishment specifications
Incident Number^{1}	Player Fine^{2}	Coach Fine^{2}
1	Warning (N/A)	Warning (N/A)
2	$2,000	N/A
3	$3,000	N/A
4	$4,000	N/A
5	$5,000	$2,000
6	$5,000	$3,000
7	$5,000	$4,000
8+	$5,000	$5,000

1. For coach incident totals, each citation issued to a player on his club counts toward his total.
2. All figures are in US dollars.

Fines listed in italics indicate that was the maximum allowed fine.

Date of incident	Offender	Team	Offense	Date of action	Amount^{1}
October 25, 2018	Kyle Clifford	Los Angeles Kings	Kneeing Jordan Greenway.	October 26, 2018	$4,301.08
November 6, 2018	Milan Lucic	Edmonton Oilers	Roughing Mathieu Joseph.	November 7, 2018	$10,000.00
November 14, 2018	Josh Morrissey	Winnipeg Jets	Unsportsmanlike conduct against T.J. Oshie.	November 15, 2018	$8,467.74
November 14, 2018	Mikko Rantanen	Colorado Avalanche	Diving/Embellishment (second citation)^{2}.	November 21, 2018	$2,000.00
November 15, 2018	Matt Cullen	Pittsburgh Penguins	Tripping J.T. Miller.	November 16, 2018	$1,000.00
November 23, 2018	Antoine Roussel	Vancouver Canucks	Biting Marc-Edouard Vlasic.	November 24, 2018	$5,000.00
December 6, 2018	Bill Peters (head coach)	Calgary Flames	Automatic fine for Ryan Lomberg instigating in the final five minutes of regulation.	December 7, 2018	$10,000.00
December 18, 2018	Vince Dunn	St. Louis Blues	Cross-checking Jujhar Khaira.	December 19, 2018	$1,942.20
December 27, 2018	Dustin Byfuglien	Winnipeg Jets	Slashing Johnny Gaudreau.	December 28, 2018	$2,500.00
December 28, 2018	Phillip Danault	Montreal Canadiens	Dangerous trip against Aaron Ekblad.	December 29, 2018	$5,000.00
January 12, 2019	Mikhail Sergachev	Tampa Bay Lightning	Cross-checking Johan Larsson.	January 13, 2019	$2,403.67
February 1, 2019	Nikita Kucherov	Tampa Bay Lightning	Dangerous trip against Scott Mayfield.	February 2, 2019	$5,000.00
February 1, 2019	Zack Smith	Ottawa Senators	Elbowing Marcus Pettersson.	February 2, 2019	$5,000.00
February 7, 2019	James van Riemsdyk	Philadelphia Flyers	High-sticking Alec Martinez.	February 8, 2019	$5,000.00
February 19, 2019	Robert Hagg	Philadelphia Flyers	Interference against Cedric Paquette.	February 20, 2019	$3,091.40
February 24, 2019	Ben Chiarot	Winnipeg Jets	Cross-checking Nick Cousins.	February 25, 2019	$3,763.44
March 1, 2019	Jaden Schwartz	St. Louis Blues	Cross-checking Dougie Hamilton.	March 2, 2019	$5,000.00
March 8, 2019	Nick Ritchie	Anaheim Ducks	Cross-checking Christian Folin.	March 9, 2019	$4,121.86
March 13, 2019	Chris Kreider	New York Rangers	Elbowing Elias Pettersson.	March 14, 2019	$5,000.00
March 16, 2019	Timo Meier	San Jose Sharks	Diving/Embellishment (second citation)^{3}.	March 21, 2019	$2,000.00
March 30, 2019	Joe Thornton	San Jose Sharks	High-sticking Ryan Reaves.	March 31, 2019	$2,500.00
March 30, 2019	Ryan Reaves	Vegas Golden Knights	High-sticking Joe Thornton.	March 31, 2019	$2,500.00
March 30, 2019	Colin Miller	Vegas Golden Knights	Diving/Embellishment (second citation)^{4}.	April 4, 2019	$2,000.00
April 5, 2019	Ryan Getzlaf	Anaheim Ducks	Roughing Adrian Kempe.	April 7, 2019	$2,500.00
Total:					$100,091.39

=== Notes ===
1. All figures are in US dollars.
2. Rantanen was issued his first citation following an incident on October 16, 2018.
3. Meier was issued his first citation following an incident on February 5, 2019.
4. Miller was issued his first citation following an incident on November 23, 2018.

== See also ==
- 2017–18 NHL suspensions and fines
- 2019–20 NHL suspensions and fines
- 2018 in sports
- 2019 in sports
- 2018–19 NHL season
- 2018–19 NHL transactions
