= Michal Kempný =

Czech ice hockey player (born 1990)

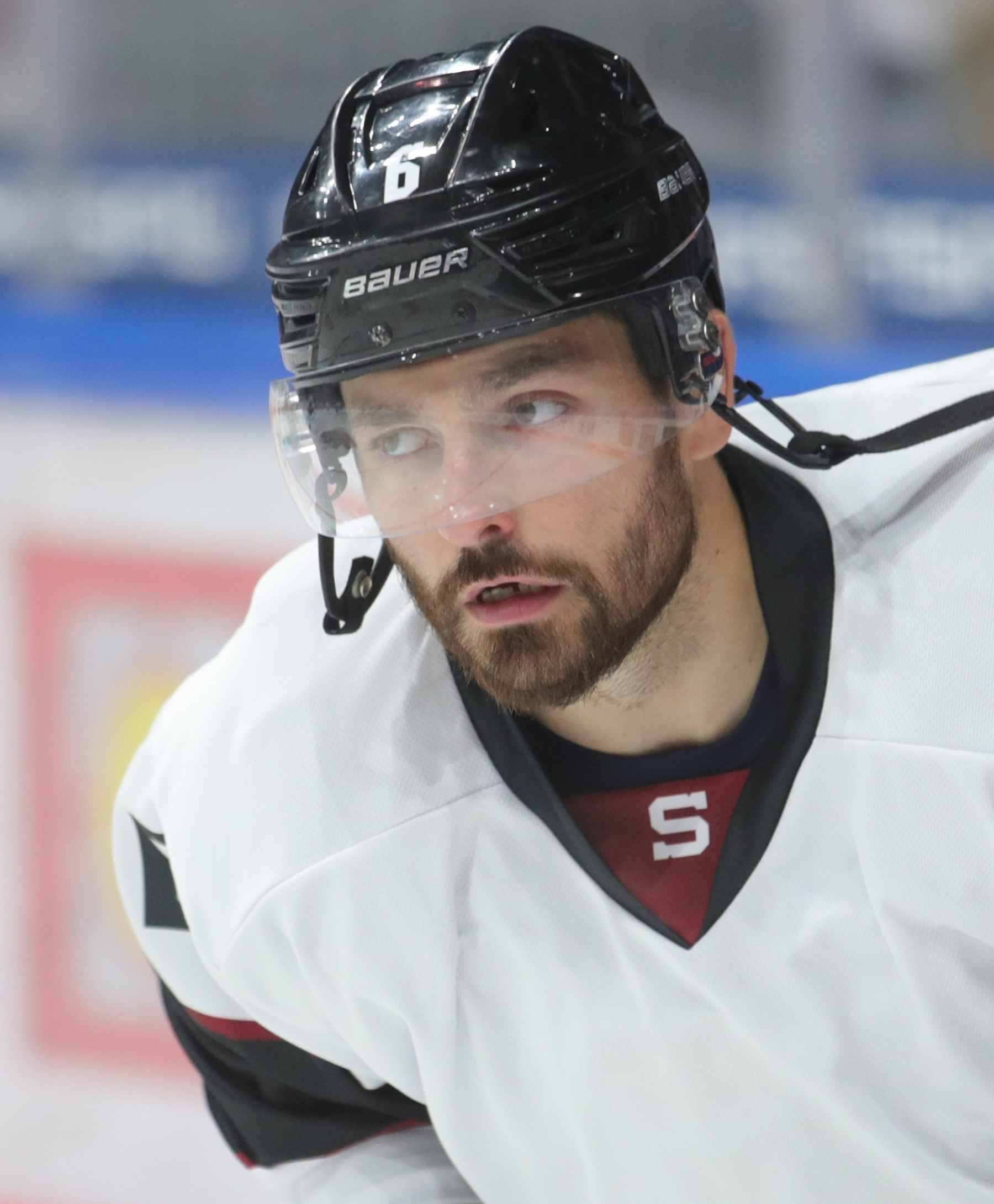
- Kempný with HC Sparta Praha in August 2023
- Born: 8 September 1990 (age 36) Hodonín, Czechoslovakia
- Height: 6 ft 0 in (183 cm)
- Weight: 194 lb (88 kg; 13 st 12 lb)
- Position: Defence
- Shoots: Left
- ELH team Former teams: Rytíři Kladno; HC Kometa Brno; HC Slavia Praha; Avangard Omsk; Chicago Blackhawks; Washington Capitals; HC Sparta Praha; Brynäs IF
- National team: Czech Republic
- NHL draft: Undrafted
- Playing career: 2008–present

Michal Kempný (born 8 September 1990) is a Czech professional ice hockey player who is a defenceman for Rytíři Kladno of the Czech Extraliga (ELH). Kempný formerly played in the National Hockey League (NHL) and won the Stanley Cup as a member of the Washington Capitals in 2018.

== Playing career ==
Kempný played as a youth in Czech Republic with HC Dyje Břeclav and made his professional debut in the Slovak Extraliga with HK 36 Skalica.

Moving to play more competitively, Kempný played for HC Kometa Brno of the Czech Extraliga.

After seven seasons of professional hockey in the ELH, Kempný was signed by Russian club, Avangard Omsk, to play in the Kontinental Hockey League on 29 April 2015. In the 2015–16 season, he quickly transitioned to become the club's top defenseman, scoring 21 points in 59 games from the blueline.

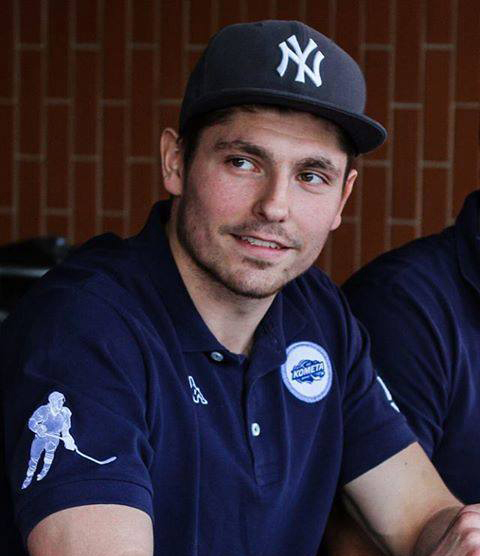
Kempný in November 2014.

Upon competing in his first senior international tournament for the Czech Republic at the 2016 IIHF World Championships, on 23 May 2016, Kempný as an undrafted free agent was signed to a one-year contract with the Chicago Blackhawks of the NHL. Kempný made his NHL debut on 12 October. He scored the first goal of his NHL career on 30 December against Cam Ward of the Carolina Hurricanes.

In his first season with the club, he recorded 8 points in 50 games. On 27 May 2017, Kempný, who was set to become a restricted free agent, was re-signed by the club to a one-year extension.

On 19 February 2018, Kempný was traded to the Washington Capitals in exchange for the higher of Toronto or Washington's own third-round pick in the 2018 NHL entry draft; the pick would later be dealt and ultimately resulted in the selection of Linus Karlsson by the San Jose Sharks. Kempný scored his first career playoff goal in Game 1 of the 2018 Eastern Conference Finals against the Tampa Bay Lightning on a wrist shot from the point. He won the Stanley Cup with the Washington Capitals on 7 June 2018, and subsequently signed a four-year, $10 million extension with Washington.

While training for 2020–21 season, Kempný tore his Achilles tendon. On 7 October 2020, the Washington Capitals announced that the defenseman had surgery to repair his injury. In consequence, Kempný's season was limited to only two games for Capitals' AHL affiliate team, Hershey Bears.

On 27 December 2021, the Capitals recalled him back to active duty after they lost six players due to the league's coronavirus protocols, including three of their top six defensemen. On 29 December 2021, Kempný had an assist in his first regular-season NHL appearance in almost two years.

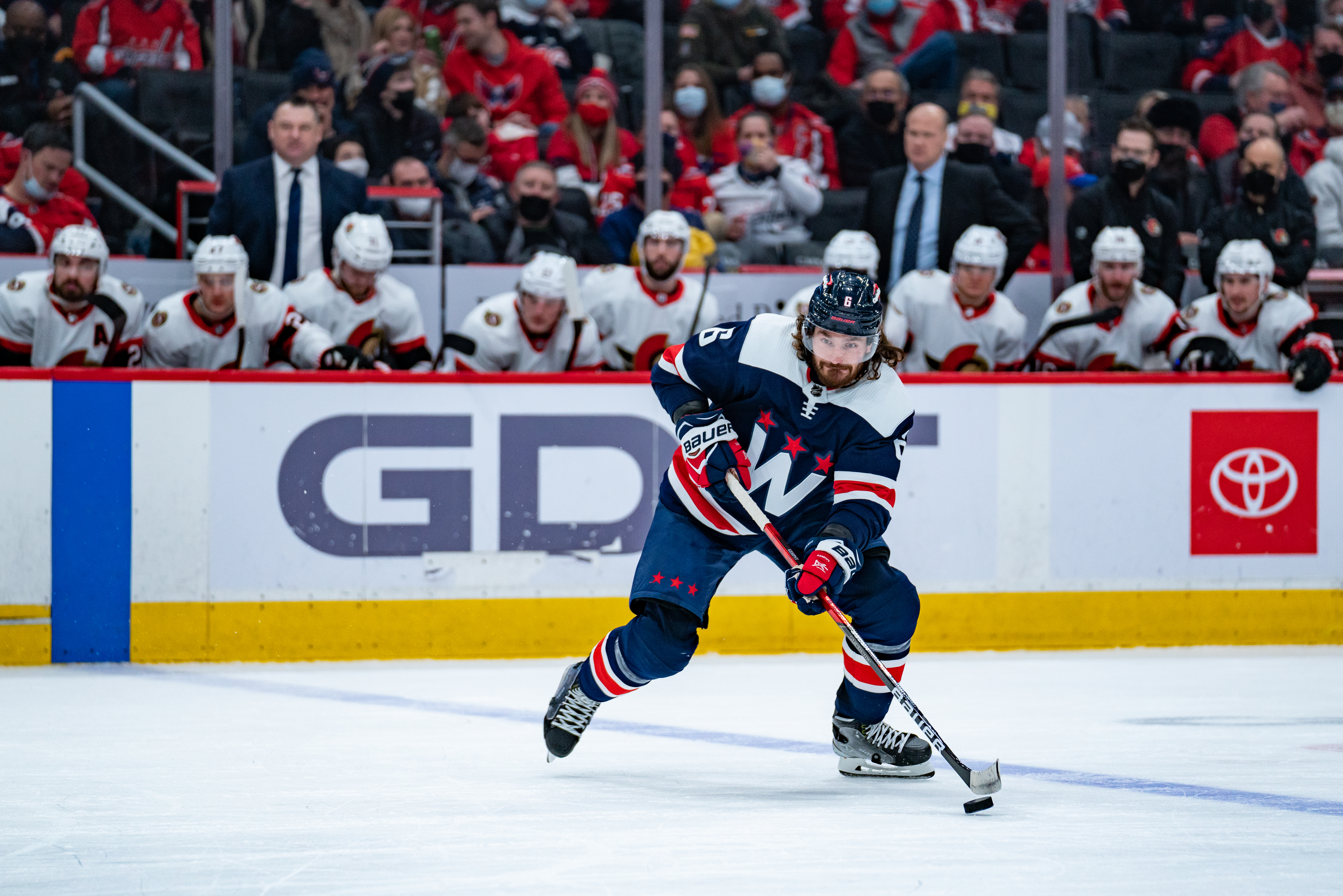
Kempný with the Washington Capitals in January 2022

As a free agent from the Capitals, following five seasons within the organization, Kempný joined his third NHL club after he was signed to a one-year, $750,000 contract with the Seattle Kraken on 24 July 2022. Unable to make the Kraken out of training camp, Kempný was placed on waivers and reassigned to AHL affiliate, Coachella Valley Firebirds to begin the 2022–23 season. He made two appearances with the Firebirds before he was placed on unconditional waivers by the Kraken in order to mutually terminate his contract on 20 October 2022.

Having returned to the Czech Republic, Kempný returning to the Extraliga for the first time since 2015, agreeing to a two-year contract with HC Sparta Praha, on 25 October 2022.

On 20 June 2025, Kempný signed a one-year contract with Brynäs IF in the Swedish Hockey League (SHL).

== International play ==
Medal record

Representing Czech Republic

Ice hockey

World Championships
Bronze medal – third place	2022 Finland	
Gold medal – first place	2024 Czechia	

Kempný represented Czechia at the 2024 IIHF World Championship and won a gold medal.

== Career statistics ==
=== Regular season and playoffs ===
			Regular season					Playoffs
Season	Team	League	GP	G	A	Pts	PIM	GP	G	A	Pts	PIM
2005–06	HK 36 Skalica	SVK U18	42	1	5	6	24	2	0	0	0	0
2006–07	HK 36 Skalica	SVK U18	50	6	14	20	40	—	—	—	—	—
2006–07	HK 36 Skalica	SVK U20	7	0	0	0	4	1	0	0	0	0
2007–08	HK 36 Skalica	SVK U18	14	5	12	17	36	—	—	—	—	—
2007–08	HK 36 Skalica	SVK U20	37	1	13	14	68	—	—	—	—	—
2007–08	HK 36 Skalica	Slovak	1	0	0	0	0	—	—	—	—	—
2008–09	HC Kometa Brno	CZE U20	23	2	5	7	91	—	—	—	—	—
2008–09	HC Kometa Brno	CZE.2	18	1	0	1	6	14	1	0	1	6
2008–09	SHK Hodonín	CZE.3	1	0	0	0	0	—	—	—	—	—
2009–10	HC Kometa Brno	CZE U20	8	2	1	3	34	—	—	—	—	—
2009–10	HC Kometa Brno	ELH	24	0	0	0	18	—	—	—	—	—
2009–10	SK Horácká Slavia Třebíč	CZE.2	8	1	0	1	14	11	2	1	3	32
2010–11	HC Kometa Brno	ELH	21	0	0	0	14	—	—	—	—	—
2010–11	HC Rebel Havlíčkův Brod	CZE.2	32	3	4	7	26	14	1	6	7	16
2011–12	HC Kometa Brno	ELH	23	1	1	2	14	—	—	—	—	—
2011–12	HC Rebel Havlíčkův Brod	CZE.2	3	0	0	0	2	—	—	—	—	—
2012–13	HC Slavia Praha	ELH	51	5	9	14	32	11	1	3	4	12
2013–14	HC Kometa Brno	ELH	51	7	8	15	74	18	2	4	6	20
2014–15	HC Kometa Brno	ELH	43	8	21	29	94	2	1	0	1	2
2015–16	Avangard Omsk	KHL	59	5	16	21	46	11	2	2	4	12
2016–17	Chicago Blackhawks	NHL	50	2	6	8	22	1	0	0	0	0
2017–18	Chicago Blackhawks	NHL	31	1	6	7	12	—	—	—	—	—
2017–18	Washington Capitals	NHL	22	2	1	3	14	24	2	3	5	10
2018–19	Washington Capitals	NHL	71	6	19	25	60	—	—	—	—	—
2019–20	Washington Capitals	NHL	58	3	15	18	22	5	0	1	1	4
2020–21	Hershey Bears	AHL	2	0	1	1	0	—	—	—	—	—
2021–22	Hershey Bears	AHL	24	0	7	7	32	—	—	—	—	—
2021–22	Washington Capitals	NHL	15	1	1	2	16	—	—	—	—	—
2022–23	Coachella Valley Firebirds	AHL	2	1	0	1	0	—	—	—	—	—
2022–23	HC Sparta Praha	ELH	35	1	27	28	28	6	2	1	3	2
2023–24	HC Sparta Praha	ELH	49	7	24	31	44	11	0	4	4	36
2024–25	HC Sparta Praha	ELH	24	3	5	8	6	12	1	0	1	8
2025–26	Brynäs IF	SHL	39	7	8	15	18	5	0	1	1	0
ELH totals			321	32	95	127	324	68	8	13	21	88
KHL totals			59	5	16	21	46	11	2	2	4	12
NHL totals			247	15	48	63	146	30	2	4	6	14

=== International ===
Year	Team	Event	Result	GP	G	A	Pts	PIM
2008	Czech Republic	U18 D1	11th	5	0	2	2	0
2010	Czech Republic	WJC	7th	6	0	2	2	0
2016	Czech Republic	WC	5th	8	0	2	2	10
2016	Czech Republic	WCH	6th	3	0	0	0	2
2017	Czech Republic	WC	7th	8	2	1	3	12
2022	Czechia	WC	3rd place, bronze medalist(s)	8	0	0	0	8
2023	Czechia	WC	8th	8	2	5	7	8
2024	Czechia	WC	1st place, gold medalist(s)	10	0	3	3	14
2026	Czechia	OG	8th	5	1	1	2	6
2026	Czechia	WC	5th	7	0	2	2	4
Junior totals				11	0	4	4	0
Senior totals				57	5	14	19	64

== Awards and honours ==
Award	Year	Source
NHL
Stanley Cup champion	2018	
