= 2017–18 NHL suspensions and fines =

The following is a list of all suspensions and fines enforced in the National Hockey League (NHL) during the 2017–18 NHL season. It lists which players or coaches of what team have been punished for which offense and the amount of punishment they have received.

Based on each player's average annual salary, divided by number of days in the season (186) for first time offenders and games (82) for repeat offenders, salary will be forfeited for the term of their suspension. Players' money forfeited due to suspension or fine goes to the Players' Emergency Assistance Fund, while money forfeited by coaches, staff or organizations as a whole go to the NHL Foundation.

== Suspensions ==
^{†} - suspension covered at least one 2017 NHL preseason game

^{‡} - suspension covered at least one 2018 postseason game

^{R} - Player was considered a repeat offender under the terms of the Collective Bargaining Agreement (player had been suspended in the 18 months prior to this suspension)

Date of Incident	Offender	Team(s)	Offense(s)	Date of Action	Length	Salary Forfeited^{1}
September 22, 2017	Tom Wilson	Washington Capitals	Interference against Robert Thomas.	September 23, 2017	2 games^{†} (2 preseason)	N/A^{2}
September 23, 2017	Andrew Desjardins	New York Rangers^{3}	Illegal check to the head of Miles Wood.	September 25, 2017	2 games^{†} (2 preseason)	N/A^{2}
October 1, 2017	Tom Wilson^{R}	Washington Capitals	Boarding Samuel Blais.	October 3, 2017	4 games	$97,560.96
October 19, 2017	Erik Gudbranson	Vancouver Canucks	Boarding Frank Vatrano.	October 20, 2017	1 game	$18,817.20
November 15, 2017	Luke Witkowski	Detroit Red Wings	Automatic suspension for returning to the ice to take part in an altercation after being escorted off by an official.	November 16, 2017	10 games	$40,322.58
November 15, 2017	Matthew Tkachuk^{R}	Calgary Flames	Unsportsmanlike conduct.	November 18, 2017	1 game	$11,280.49
November 16, 2017	Radko Gudas^{R}	Philadelphia Flyers	Slashing Mathieu Perreault.	November 19, 2017	10 games	$408,536.59
November 18, 2017	Austin Watson	Nashville Predators	Boarding Dominic Toninato.	November 19, 2017	2 games	$11,827.96
November 25, 2017	Gabriel Landeskog	Colorado Avalanche	Cross-checking Matthew Tkachuk.	November 27, 2017	4 games	$119,815.68
November 29, 2017	Cedric Paquette	Tampa Bay Lightning	Boarding Torey Krug.	November 30, 2017	1 game	$4,368.28
December 4, 2017	Brenden Dillon	San Jose Sharks	Slashing Madison Bowey.	December 5, 2017	1 game	$17,580.65
December 6, 2017	Matthew Tkachuk^{R}	Calgary Flames	Unsportsmanlike conduct.	December 7, 2017	1 game	$11,280.49
December 16, 2017	Erik Johnson	Colorado Avalanche	Boarding Vladislav Namestnikov.	December 17, 2017	2 games	$64,516.12
December 23, 2017	Zac Rinaldo	Arizona Coyotes	Punching an unsuspecting Samuel Girard.	December 27, 2017	6 games	$22,580.64
December 27, 2017	Fredrik Claesson	Ottawa Senators	Illegal check to the head of Noel Acciari.	December 28, 2017	2 games	$6,989.24
January 2, 2018	Patrick Maroon	Edmonton Oilers	Interference against Drew Doughty.	January 3, 2018	2 games	$21,505.38
January 13, 2018	Andrew Cogliano^{4}	Anaheim Ducks	Interference against Adrian Kempe.	January 14, 2018	2 games	$32,258.06
January 23, 2018	Brad Marchand^{R}	Boston Bruins	Elbowing Marcus Johansson.	January 24, 2018	5 games	$373,475.60
February 3, 2018	Filip Forsberg	Nashville Predators	Interference against Jimmy Vesey.	February 4, 2018	3 games	$96,774.19
February 6, 2018	Alex Burrows	Ottawa Senators	Serving as the aggressor in an altercation/kneeing Taylor Hall.	February 7, 2018	10 games	$134,408.60
February 10, 2018	Dustin Brown	Los Angeles Kings	Kneeing Mikhail Sergachev.	February 11, 2018	1 game	$31,586.02
February 17, 2018	Miles Wood	New Jersey Devils	Boarding Vladislav Namestnikov.	February 7, 2018	2 games	$9,946.24
March 6, 2018	David Backes	Boston Bruins	Interference against Frans Nielsen.	March 7, 2018	3 games	$96,774.19
April 11, 2018	Drew Doughty	Los Angeles Kings	Illegal check to the head of William Carrier.	April 12, 2018	1 game^{‡} (1 postseason)	N/A^{2}
April 12, 2018	Nazem Kadri	Toronto Maple Leafs	Boarding Tommy Wingels.	April 13, 2018	3 games^{‡} (3 postseason)	N/A^{2}
April 17, 2018	Josh Morrissey	Winnipeg Jets	Cross-checking Eric Staal.	April 18, 2018	1 game^{‡} (1 postseason)	N/A^{2}
April 18, 2018	Ryan Hartman	Nashville Predators	Illegal check to the head of Carl Soderberg.	April 19, 2018	1 game^{‡} (1 postseason)	N/A^{2}
April 26, 2018	Evander Kane	San Jose Sharks	Cross-checking Pierre-Edouard Bellemare.	April 27, 2018	1 game^{‡} (1 postseason)	N/A^{2}
May 1, 2018	Tom Wilson^{R}	Washington Capitals	Illegal check to the head of Zach Aston-Reese.	May 2, 2018	3 games^{‡} (3 postseason)	N/A^{2}
Player totals:					87 games^{†} (4 preseason + 73 regular + 10 postseason)	$1,632,205.16

=== Notes ===
1. All figures are in US dollars.
2. As players are not paid salary in the preseason or postseason, no fines are generated for games lost due to suspension during those periods.
3. Desjardins was signed to a professional try out with the New York Rangers at the time of the incident.
4. Cogliano had played a total of 830 consecutive games from the start of his career prior to the suspension.

== Fines ==
Players can be fined up to 50% of one day's salary, up to a maximum of $10,000.00 for their first offense, and $15,000.00 for any subsequent offenses (player had been fined in the 12 months prior to this fine). Coaches, non-playing personnel, and teams are not restricted to such maximums.

Fines for players/coaches fined for diving/embellishment are structured uniquely and are only handed out after non-publicized warnings are given to the player/coach for their first offense. For more details on diving/embellishment fines:

Diving/embellishment specifications
Incident Number^{1}	Player Fine^{2}	Coach Fine^{2}
1	Warning (N/A)	Warning (N/A)
2	$2,000	N/A
3	$3,000	N/A
4	$4,000	N/A
5	$5,000	$2,000
6	$5,000	$3,000
7	$5,000	$4,000
8+	$5,000	$5,000

1. For coach incident totals, each citation issued to a player on his club counts toward his total.
2. All figures are in US dollars.

Fines listed in italics indicate that was the maximum allowed fine.

Date of Incident	Offender	Team	Offense	Date of Action	Amount^{1}
October 9, 2017	Robert Bortuzzo	St. Louis Blues	Cross-checking Brock Nelson.	October 9, 2017	$3,091.40
October 18, 2017	Vladimir Sobotka	St. Louis Blues	High-sticking Patrick Sharp.	October 19, 2017	$5,000.00
October 24, 2017	Ryan Hartman	Chicago Blackhawks	Slashing Brayden McNabb.	October 25, 2017	$2,320.79
November 2, 2017	Kevin Hayes	New York Rangers	Unsportsmanlike conduct.	November 3, 2017	$5,000.00
November 2, 2017	Alex Killorn	Tampa Bay Lightning	Unsportsmanlike conduct.	November 3, 2017	$5,000.00
November 2, 2017	Steven Stamkos	Tampa Bay Lightning	Unsportsmanlike conduct.	November 3, 2017	$5,000.00
November 11, 2017	Timo Meier	San Jose Sharks	Roughing Michael Del Zotto.	November 12, 2017	$2,403.67
November 14, 2017	Marco Scandella	Buffalo Sabres	Slashing Patric Hornqvist.	November 15, 2017	$5,000.00
November 22, 2017	John Hayden	Chicago Blackhawks	High-sticking J.T. Brown.	November 23, 2017	$2,486.56
November 24, 2017	Ben Chiarot	Winnipeg Jets	Butt-ending Corey Perry.	November 25, 2017	$3,763.44
November 27, 2017	Matt Dumba	Minnesota Wild	Unsportsmanlike conduct.	November 28, 2017	$5,000.00
November 27, 2017	Patrick Kane	Chicago Blackhawks	Slashing Nick Ritchie.	November 28, 2017	$5,000.00
December 2, 2017	Joe Thornton	San Jose Sharks	Slashing Tyler Johnson.	December 3, 2017	$5,000.00
December 9, 2017	Alex Burrows	Ottawa Senators	Roughing Dylan DeMelo.	December 10, 2017	$5,000.00
December 19, 2017	Justin Abdelkader	Detroit Red Wings	Spearing Scott Mayfield.	December 20, 2017	$5,000.00
December 31, 2017	Frederik Andersen	Toronto Maple Leafs	Diving/Embellishment (second citation)^{2}.	January 4, 2018	$2,000.00
January 7, 2018	David Savard	Columbus Blue Jackets	Slashing Vincent Trocheck.	January 8, 2018	$5,000.00
January 18, 2018	Dustin Brown	Los Angeles Kings	Cross-checking Justin Schultz.	January 19, 2018	$10,000.00
January 18, 2018	Evgeni Malkin	Pittsburgh Penguins	Spearing Dustin Brown.	January 19, 2018	$5,000.00
January 30, 2018	Taylor Hall	New Jersey Devils	Boarding Kyle Okposo.	January 31, 2018	$5,000.00
February 2, 2018	T.J. Oshie	Washington Capitals	Cross-checking Kris Letang.	February 3, 2018	$5,000.00
February 13, 2018	Madison Bowey	Washington Capitals	Interference against Matt Hendricks.	February 14, 2018	$1,890.68
February 13, 2018	Dustin Byfuglien	Winnipeg Jets	Slashing Jay Beagle.	February 14, 2018	$5,000.00
February 13, 2018	Deryk Engelland	Vegas Golden Knights	Cross-checking Brandon Saad.	February 14, 2018	$2,688.17
March 1, 2018	Nick Cousins	Arizona Coyotes	Diving/Embellishment (second citation)^{3}.	March 9, 2018	$2,000.00
March 1, 2018	Brad Marchand	Boston Bruins	Diving/Embellishment (second citation)^{4}.	March 9, 2018	$2,000.00
March 10, 2018	Oliver Ekman-Larsson	Arizona Coyotes	Slashing Sven Andrighetto.	March 10, 2018	$5,000.00
March 20, 2018	Steven Stamkos	Tampa Bay Lightning	Dangerous trip against Morgan Rielly.	March 21, 2018	$5,000.00
March 21, 2018	Robert Bortuzzo	St. Louis Blues	Cross-checking Jordan Szwarz.	March 22, 2018	$3,091.40
March 29, 2018	Mike Matheson	Florida Panthers	Diving/Embellishment (second citation)^{5}.	April 6, 2018	$2,000.00
March 31, 2018	Ian Cole	Columbus Blue Jackets	Dangerous trip against Brandon Sutter.	April 1, 2018	$5,000.00
April 1, 2018	Brad Marchand	Boston Bruins	Cross-checking Andrew MacDonald.	April 2, 2018	$5,000.00
May 13, 2018	Michal Kempny	Washington Capitals	Cross-checking Cedric Paquette.	May 14, 2018	$2,419.35
Player totals:					$137,155.46

=== Notes ===
1. All figures are in US dollars.
2. Andersen was issued his first citation following an incident on November 24, 2017.
3. Cousins was issued his first citation following an incident on January 4, 2018.
4. Marchand was issued his first citation following an incident on November 29, 2017.
5. Matheson was issued his first citation following an incident on January 7, 2018.

== See also ==
- 2016–17 NHL suspensions and fines
- 2018–19 NHL suspensions and fines
- 2017 in sports
- 2018 in sports
- 2017–18 NHL season
- 2017–18 NHL transactions
