= 2019–20 NHL season =

National Hockey League season

- League: National Hockey League
- Sport: Ice hockey
- Duration: October 2, 2019 – March 11, 2020; August 1 – September 28, 2020
- Games: 68–71
- Teams: 31
- TV partner(s): CBC, Sportsnet/SN1/SN360, Citytv, FX, TVA Sports (Canada); NBCSN, NBC, CNBC, USA (United States)

Draft
- Top draft pick: Jack Hughes
- Picked by: New Jersey Devils

Regular season
- Presidents' Trophy: Boston Bruins
- Season MVP: Leon Draisaitl (Oilers)
- Top scorer: Leon Draisaitl (Oilers)

Playoffs
- Playoffs MVP: Victor Hedman (Lightning)

Stanley Cup
- Champions: Tampa Bay Lightning
- Runners-up: Dallas Stars

NHL seasons
- 2018–19 2020–21

The 2019–20 NHL season was the 103rd season of operation (102nd season of play) of the National Hockey League. The regular season began on October 2, 2019, with the Stanley Cup playoffs originally planned for April and the Stanley Cup Final planned for June. The season was suspended indefinitely on March 12, 2020, due to the COVID-19 pandemic.

On May 22, 2020, the NHL and National Hockey League Players' Association (NHLPA) agreed to a framework for the resumption of play, which would see the remainder of the regular season scrapped, and the top 12 teams in each conference (by points percentage) competing in a modified and expanded Stanley Cup playoffs, which the NHL planned to hold in two centralized "hub cities", Toronto's Scotiabank Arena and Edmonton's Rogers Place, with no spectators and only essential staff present.

The playoffs began on August 1, 2020, and ended on September 28, with the Tampa Bay Lightning defeating the Dallas Stars in the Stanley Cup Final in six games, winning their second Stanley Cup in franchise history.

== League business ==
=== Collective bargaining agreement ===
The collective bargaining agreement (CBA), previously signed to end the 2012–13 NHL lockout, entered into its eighth season. Before the season started, both the NHL and the NHLPA had the choice to opt out of the CBA on September 1 and September 16, 2019, respectively. If either of them had opted out, the CBA would have expired at the end of this season instead of at the end of 2021–22. The NHL announced on August 30 that they would not opt out, and the NHLPA then also agreed on September 16 not to opt out.

=== Salary cap ===
The salary cap was set at US$81.5 million, as announced on June 22, 2019.

=== Seattle expansion team ===
Due to the COVID-19 pandemic, the christening of the Seattle Kraken was delayed to July 23, 2020. The expansion team, set to begin play during the 2021–22 season, originally planned to announce the club's name in early 2020.

Ron Francis was hired as Seattle's first general manager on July 17, 2019.

=== Rule changes ===
The following rule changes were proposed June 19, 2019, and approved the next day:

- The league adopted the David Leggio Rule: deliberately moving the goalposts off its moorings to stop play on a breakaway will result in an awarded goal to the attacking team.
- In the event a net is inadvertently knocked off its moorings, or if a puck shot from beyond center ice is stopped and frozen by the goaltender, the face-off will take place in the goaltender's defensive zone, with the team on offense given choice of side. In such cases, the defensive team will not be allowed to make a line change.
- A puck that leaves play in the attacking zone will remain in the attacking zone for the next face-off.
- Players who lose their helmet during play must return to the bench as soon as it is feasible until it can be replaced, or the player must retrieve their helmet.
- Linesmen will now drop the puck at centre ice after goals and at the start of overtime instead of the referees.

Expansion of video review

- Teams now have an unlimited number of coach's challenges, but failed challenges will now result in delay-of-game penalties instead of the loss of their timeout. The first failed challenge will result in a two-minute minor, and each subsequent failed challenge will result in a four-minute double-minor.
- A team may challenge goals that follow plays in the attacking zone that should have instead resulted in a stoppage before the puck went into the net. Missed stoppages include hand passes, pucks high-sticked to a teammate, and pucks hitting the netting or going into the players bench. The delay-of-game penalty for pucks going over the glass will still not be reviewable under this situation.
- All match and major penalties, excluding fighting, will be required to video review; officials will reserve the authority to reduce the penalty to a minor penalty depending on the result of the review, but referees cannot rescind a penalty altogether.
- Referees have the option to review high-sticking double minors at their discretion and without consultation with the NHL's Situation Room.
- The league eliminates the use of goal judges and assigns those duties to the in-house video replay official.

Modification to the tie-breaking procedure

To put more emphasis on teams winning in regulation, regulation wins (tracked in an additional RW column in the league standings) will now precede regulation and overtime wins (ROW) in the tie-breaking procedure. The league also added goals scored as a new tiebreaker.

=== Player and puck tracking technology ===
After testing at the 2019 National Hockey League All-Star Game, the NHL planned to deploy player and puck tracking systems to all 31 NHL arenas prior to the start of the 2019–20 season. This technology was developed in collaboration with a German Fraunhofer Institute using transmitters embedded inside pucks and jerseys. It enables on-air features such as speed displays, puck tracking graphics (reminiscent of the FoxTrax graphics utilized in the late 1990s by previous U.S. national NHL broadcaster Fox, also developed by Sportvision), and marker graphics hovering above players.

On September 5, 2019, it was reported that the league replaced its primary technology partner in its tracking technology, and thus the system likely would not be up and running until the 2020 playoffs at the earliest.

==== Personnel ====
On November 11, 2019, Sportsnet fired studio commentator Don Cherry for comments that suggested Canadian immigrants benefit from the sacrifices of veterans but do not wear Remembrance Day poppies. The segment Coach's Corner on Hockey Night in Canada was canceled the following week.

This was the final season for lead NBC play-by-play announcer Mike Emrick. Emrick announced his retirement from broadcasting on October 19, 2020, after a 47-year career.

Carolina Hurricanes play-by-play announcer John Forslund was replaced by rinkside reporter Mike Maniscalco prior to the 2020 Stanley Cup playoffs. Forslund had been the television voice of the Whalers/Hurricanes franchise since 1995, and added radio play-by-play in 2018 after the team removed Chuck Kaiton from the position.

=== Sports betting ===
As part of its renovations, the Philadelphia Flyers and Wells Fargo Center announced that Rivers Casino Philadelphia (then SugarHouse Casino) would become the venue's official sportsbook partner, with the venue adding two lounge areas with odds boards to promote the casino's sports betting app.

=== Draft ===
The 2019 NHL entry draft was held on June 21 and 22, 2019, with Jack Hughes being selected first overall by the New Jersey Devils.

=== Preseason games in Europe ===
Two preseason games were played in Europe. The Chicago Blackhawks played against Eisbären Berlin at Mercedes-Benz Arena in Berlin, Germany, on September 29, 2019. The Philadelphia Flyers played against Lausanne HC at Vaudoise Aréna in Lausanne, Switzerland on September 30, 2019.

=== General Manager of the Year Award ===
On November 19, 2019, the NHL announced it would rename the General Manager of the Year Award in honour of Jim Gregory, the recently deceased former general manager of the Toronto Maple Leafs and former NHL executive. The official name is changed to the "Jim Gregory General Manager of the Year Award."

== Coaching changes ==
Coaching changes
Off–season
Team	2018–19 coach	2019–20 coach	Story / Accomplishments
Anaheim Ducks	Randy Carlyle; Bob Murray*	Dallas Eakins	Carlyle was fired on February 10, 2019, nearly three years into his second stint with the team. He won the Stanley Cup in 2007, but since then had made the playoffs only two times. Carlyle was 21–26–9 at the time of his firing. General manager Murray took over as interim coach until the end of the season. Murray finished out the season 14–11–1. Eakins was hired on June 17, 2019. Eakins most recently served as the head coach of the San Diego Gulls of the American Hockey League (AHL) from 2015 to 2019.
Buffalo Sabres	Phil Housley	Ralph Krueger	Housley was fired April 7, 2019, after two seasons and a 58–84–22 record with the Sabres. Housley finished his first season in last place, and squandered a 10-game winning streak in his second season only to collapse and miss the playoffs. Krueger was hired May 15, 2019. He did not coach ice hockey full-time since his only previous NHL coaching stint, a half-season with the Edmonton Oilers in 2013, ended with his firing.
Edmonton Oilers	Todd McLellan; Ken Hitchcock*	Dave Tippett	McLellan was fired on November 20, 2018, after starting the season 9–10–1. McLellan had been the Oilers' head coach since the 2015–16 season, leading the team to a 123–119–24 record and a playoff berth in 2016–17. Hitchcock, a head coach with the third most wins in the NHL, was hired out of his announced retirement to replace McLellan for the remainder of the season. Hitchcock was fired after Ken Holland became the general manager of the Oilers on May 7, 2019. Hitchcock finished the season 26–28–8, outside of the playoffs. Tippett was hired on May 28. He last served as head coach of the Arizona Coyotes from 2009 to 2017.
Florida Panthers	Bob Boughner	Joel Quenneville	Boughner was fired on April 7, 2019. In two seasons, the Panthers went 79–62–22 and never qualified for the playoffs under Boughner. On April 8, Quenneville was hired as the team's new head coach. Quenneville most recently served as the head coach of the Chicago Blackhawks (2008–2018), and guided them to three Stanley Cup championships in 2010, 2013 and 2015. He accumulated an overall record of 797–452–249 with the team.
Los Angeles Kings	John Stevens; Willie Desjardins*	Todd McLellan	Stevens was fired on November 4, 2018, after starting the season 4–8–1, reaching the first round of the playoffs in his only full season as coach. Former Vancouver Canucks' head coach Desjardins was named the interim coach for the team. Desjardins finished out the season 27–34–8, outside of the playoffs. On April 16, 2019, the team hired McLellan as franchise's 29th head coach. McLellan most recently served as the head coach of the Edmonton Oilers (2015–2018).
Ottawa Senators	Guy Boucher; Marc Crawford*	D. J. Smith	Boucher was fired on March 1, 2019, after three seasons with the team, his best season being the 2016–17 season when the team reached the Eastern Conference finals. At the time of his firing, Boucher was 22–37–5. Crawford, who previously coached the Dallas Stars, was named the Senators' interim head coach. Crawford finished the season 7–10–1, outside of the playoffs. On May 23, the team hired Smith as their head coach. He most recently served as an assistant coach of the Toronto Maple Leafs.
Philadelphia Flyers	Dave Hakstol; Scott Gordon*	Alain Vigneault	Hakstol was fired on December 17, 2018, after three and a half years with the team where he guided them to two playoff appearances. At the time of his firing, the team was 12–15–4. Former New York Islanders' head coach Gordon was named interim coach. Gordon finished the season 25–22–4, outside of the playoffs. Vigneault was hired on April 15, 2019. Vigneault most recently served as the head coach of the New York Rangers, guiding them to a 226–147–37 record in five seasons (2013–2018).
St. Louis Blues	Mike Yeo; Craig Berube*	Craig Berube	Yeo was fired on November 19, 2018, after almost two years with the team and only one playoff appearance. Berube, who had served as assistant coach with the Blues since 2017, was named interim head coach. After coaching the Blues to their first Stanley Cup championship in 2019, Berube was named permanent head coach on June 24, 2019.
In–season
Team	Outgoing coach	Incoming coach	Story / Accomplishments
Calgary Flames	Bill Peters	Geoff Ward*	Peters resigned on November 29, 2019, after accusations of racism were made by former Rockford IceHogs player Akim Aliu when Peters was coaching the AHL club a decade earlier. Peters spent 1 1/3 seasons with the Flames, registering a record of 12–12–4 to start the season after reaching the first round of the playoffs as the top seed in the Western Conference the previous season. Ward, who served as an assistant coach, was named interim head coach.
Dallas Stars	Jim Montgomery	Rick Bowness*	Montgomery was dismissed on December 10, 2019, due to "unprofessional conduct inconsistent with the core values and beliefs" of the Stars and the league. He spent 1 1/3 seasons with the Stars, registering a record of 17–11–3 to start the season after reaching the second round of the playoffs the previous season. Bowness, who served as an assistant coach, was named interim head coach.
Minnesota Wild	Bruce Boudreau	Dean Evason*	Boudreau was fired on February 14, 2020, after 3 2/3 seasons with the team, which had registered a record of 27–23–7 to start the season. The Wild had reached the playoffs in the first two seasons of his tenure in Minnesota but had not qualified for the playoffs since the 2017–18 season. Evason, who had served as an assistant coach with the Wild since the start of the 2018–19 season, was immediately named interim head coach.
Nashville Predators	Peter Laviolette	John Hynes	Laviolette was fired on January 6, 2020, after 5 1/2 seasons with the team, which had registered a 19–15–7 record to start the season. The Predators made the playoffs in all five seasons under Laviolette, advanced to the 2017 Stanley Cup Final and won the Presidents' Trophy in the 2017–18 season. Hynes, who previously served as the head coach of the New Jersey Devils, was hired on January 7, 2020.
New Jersey Devils	John Hynes	Alain Nasreddine*	Hynes was fired on December 3, 2019, after 4 1/3 seasons with the team, which had registered a 9–13–4 record to start the season. The Devils reached the playoffs once in Hynes' tenure, and did not advance past the first round in 2018. Nasreddine, who served as an assistant coach, was named interim head coach.
San Jose Sharks	Peter DeBoer	Bob Boughner*	DeBoer was fired on December 11, 2019, after 4 1/3 seasons with the team, which had registered a record of 15–16–2 to start the season. The Sharks qualified for the playoffs in all of the four previous seasons under DeBoer, and advanced to the 2016 Stanley Cup Final. Boughner, who served as an assistant coach, was named interim head coach.
Toronto Maple Leafs	Mike Babcock	Sheldon Keefe	Babcock was fired on November 20, 2019, after 4 1/4 seasons with the team, which had registered a record of 9–10–4 to start the season after reaching the first round of the playoffs in the previous three seasons. Keefe, who had served as the head coach of the Toronto Marlies of the AHL from 2015 to 2019, was subsequently named as the team's next head coach.
Vegas Golden Knights	Gerard Gallant	Peter DeBoer	Gallant was fired on January 15, 2020, after a little more than 2 1/2 seasons with the team, which had registered a record of 24–19–6 to start the season. The Golden Knights had reached the playoffs in their first two seasons of existence, including advancing to the 2018 Stanley Cup Final in their debut season. Gallant earned the Jack Adams Award that season. DeBoer, who had been fired as the head coach of the San Jose Sharks one month earlier, was subsequently named as the team's second head coach.

(*) Indicates interim.

== Front office changes ==
General managers
Off–season
Team	2018–19 GM	2019–20 GM	Story / Accomplishments
Detroit Red Wings	Ken Holland	Steve Yzerman	Yzerman, who played his entire NHL career for the Red Wings and had previously been the team's vice president from 2006 to 2010, returned as general manager on April 19, 2019.
Edmonton Oilers	Peter Chiarelli; Keith Gretzky*	Ken Holland	Chiarelli was fired on January 22, 2019, after four years as the Oilers' general manager. Gretzky, the brother of former NHL player Wayne Gretzky, was named interim general manager. Holland was hired on May 7, 2019.
Minnesota Wild	Paul Fenton	Bill Guerin	Fenton was fired on July 30, 2019, after one year as general manager. On August 21, it was announced that Guerin had been named general manager of the Wild.
Vegas Golden Knights	George McPhee	Kelly McCrimmon	McCrimmon was promoted to general manager, effective September 1, 2019, on May 2, 2019. McPhee will remain director of hockey operations of the Golden Knights, but McCrimmon will represent them at the league's general manager meetings and be the point of contact for other general managers.
In–season
Team	Outgoing general manager	Incoming general manager	Story / Accomplishments
Arizona Coyotes	John Chayka; Steve Sullivan*	Bill Armstrong	Chayka (after four years with the team) quit unexpectedly as the team headed into the 2020 qualifying round. Steve Sullivan was named interim general manager. During the off-season, on September 17, 2020, the Coyotes hired former Blues assistant GM, Bill Armstrong, as their new general manager.
New Jersey Devils	Ray Shero	Tom Fitzgerald*	Shero was fired on January 12, 2020, after five years as the Devils' general manager. Fitzgerald was named interim general manager.

(*) Indicates interim.

== Regular season ==
The regular season began on October 2, 2019, and was originally supposed to end on April 4, 2020, but due to the COVID-19 pandemic, the season was suspended on March 12, 2020. On May 26, 2020, it was announced that the regular season would not be finished.

=== International games ===
Three regular season games, branded as the NHL Global Series, were played in Europe. The Chicago Blackhawks and Philadelphia Flyers played their regular season opening game on October 4, 2019, at O2 Arena in Prague, Czech Republic. The Buffalo Sabres and Tampa Bay Lightning played two games at Ericsson Globe in Stockholm, Sweden, on November 8 and 9, 2019.

=== Outdoor games ===
Three outdoor games were held during the 2019–20 season:

- The Heritage Classic was held on October 26, 2019, at Mosaic Stadium in Regina, Saskatchewan, featuring the Calgary Flames and the Winnipeg Jets.
- The Winter Classic was held on January 1, 2020, at Cotton Bowl in Dallas, Texas, featuring the Nashville Predators and the Dallas Stars.
- The Stadium Series was held on February 15, 2020, at Falcon Stadium in Colorado Springs, Colorado, featuring the Los Angeles Kings and the Colorado Avalanche.

=== All-Star Game ===
The 2020 National Hockey League All-Star Game was held in St. Louis, Missouri, at Enterprise Center, the home of the St. Louis Blues, on January 25, 2020.

=== Postponed game ===
The St. Louis Blues – Anaheim Ducks game on February 11, 2020, was suspended at a 1−1 tie with 7:50 left in the first period after Blues defenceman Jay Bouwmeester collapsed on the bench in a medical emergency due to a cardiac episode. He eventually had an implantable cardioverter-defibrillator procedure and was placed on injured reserve. The game was made up on March 11. This resulted in the Blues' home game against the Florida Panthers being moved one day earlier from March 10 to March 9.

=== Suspension of the regular season due to COVID-19 ===
As the COVID-19 pandemic spread across the globe, concern began to build that large crowds at sporting events would spread the virus that causes COVID-19. In early March 2020, the NHL suspended media access to the locker rooms, saying that only official personnel would be allowed in after the games to limit person-to-person contact. The San Jose Sharks were planning to play three home games without fans from March 19, following San Francisco's order prohibiting assemblies larger than 1,000 individuals. Meanwhile, the Columbus Blue Jackets had also proposed to play home games without fans, due to Ohio governor Mike DeWine banning mass gatherings in the state.

But after the National Basketball Association (NBA) suspended all games when Rudy Gobert and another player tested positive for COVID-19 on the day that the World Health Organization declared the disease to be a pandemic, the NHL scheduled a meeting to discuss pausing the season. On March 12, morning practice sessions and media access for all teams were canceled. Shortly after, they announced that the 2019–20 season had been paused indefinitely. This became the biggest interruption to regular NHL season games since the 2012–13 NHL lockout. All players and hockey staff were asked to self-quarantine in their home cities until further notice.

One of the players from the Ottawa Senators had tested positive for COVID-19 on March 17. Four days later, on March 21, it was announced that a second Senators player tested positive for COVID-19. Two Colorado Avalanche players also tested positive for the virus. On April 4, the originally intended date for the final games of the regular season, Commissioner Gary Bettman participated in a call with U.S. president Donald Trump and other sport commissioners on the state of the sport world.

=== Return to play with modified playoff format ===
On May 22, the league and the NHLPA agreed on a basic framework to stage a 24-team playoff tournament behind closed doors. The details of the plan were announced publicly on May 26. The seeds would be based on each club's points percentage when the season paused on March 12 (effectively scrapping the remainder of the regular season and making this the first season in NHL history where some teams played more regular season games than others in a year that did not have a team fold during the regular season). The top four seeds in each conference would get a bye, while the next eight seeds in each conference would play in a best-of-five series. Many of the logistics still needed to be negotiated, including COVID-19 testing protocols, visas, and whether these games would be held in one or more "hub" cities as the Canada–United States border would remain closed to non-essential travel until June 21. That same day, the U.S. government announced that foreign athletes would be exempted from pandemic-related travel bans still in effect.

On May 26, Bettman formally discussed aspects of the "Return to Play Plan", including the proposed 24-team playoff format (with the top four teams in each conference playing a round robin tournament under regular season overtime rules to determine their seeds), and modifications to the procedures for the Draft Lottery. Aspects of the format (including the possibility of a best-of-five format for the first and second round, and changes to bracketing) were still being negotiated, but it was stated that the conference finals and Stanley Cup Final would still use a best-of-seven series. Bettman stated that at least two hub cities would be used for the playoffs, shortlisting hosts such as Chicago, Columbus, Dallas, Edmonton, Las Vegas, Los Angeles, Minneapolis, Pittsburgh, Toronto and Vancouver. Health, testing, and security protocols would be in place at these sites.

On June 4, it was announced that the NHL and NHLPA had approved aspects of the format that had not yet been finalized during the May 26 briefing, with the first and second rounds proper using a best-of-seven format as usual, and all teams being reseeded after each round (to account for the lack of home advantage due to all games being played at a neutral site).

It was reported that the NHL planned to have one American host and one Canadian host. As Canada's Quarantine Act at the time required all travellers entering the country to self-isolate for 14 days on arrival, deputy commissioner Bill Daly stated that this may impact the ability to use Canadian host cities unless these issues can be addressed. On June 10, British Columbia Premier John Horgan stated that the province's medical officer Bonnie Henry had endorsed proposed protocols developed by the Vancouver Canucks in collaboration with local officials, and that they were being sent to Prime Minister Justin Trudeau for federal approval. These included allowing the NHL to "cohort" players and restrict their access to the general public.

Phase 2 of the "Return to Play Plan" began on June 8. Players were allowed to resume use of team practice facilities in small groups (no more than six), with only players allowed on-ice and no other agents or press admitted. Players had to self-isolate for 14 days if they used public transport, and were regularly monitored and tested for COVID-19. If a player tests positive, they could not attend training until they had been cleared, with teams suggested to use guidelines issued by the U.S. Centers for Disease Control and Prevention (CDC). Training camps (phase 3) were planned to reopen on July 10. Amidst an intense growth of new cases in Florida, the Tampa Bay Lightning temporarily closed their training facility on June 19 after several staff members and three players tested positive for COVID-19.

On June 24, Sportsnet reported that Vancouver's bid had been complicated by disagreements over protocols for positive cases. The next day, Global BC's Richard Zussman reported that the NHL had "moved on [for now]" from Vancouver, and was increasing its focus on Edmonton and Toronto as potential sites. While Las Vegas was initially considered a front-runner, a spike of cases in Nevada and other U.S. states led to reports on July 1 that the NHL had decided on Edmonton and Toronto as the sites.

On July 10, the NHL confirmed that it had ratified agreements with the NHLPA to begin the playoffs on August 1 (concluding no later than early October), with games being hosted by Edmonton (Western Conference early rounds, conference finals, and Stanley Cup Final) and Toronto (Eastern Conference early rounds). The league also renewed its collective bargaining agreement (CBA) for four additional seasons, which includes an increase to minimum player salaries and a 10% deference of player salaries for the 2020–21 season (to be paid out over three seasons beginning 2022–23).

== Standings ==
=== Eastern Conference ===
Pos	Team	GP	W	L	OTL	RW	GF	GA	GD	PCT	Qualification
1	Boston Bruins	70	44	14	12	38	227	174	+53	.714	Advance to Seeding round-robin tournament
2	Tampa Bay Lightning	70	43	21	6	35	245	195	+50	.657	Advance to Seeding round-robin tournament
3	Washington Capitals	69	41	20	8	31	240	215	+25	.652	Advance to Seeding round-robin tournament
4	Philadelphia Flyers	69	41	21	7	31	232	196	+36	.645	Advance to Seeding round-robin tournament
5	Pittsburgh Penguins	69	40	23	6	29	224	196	+28	.623	Advance to 2020 Stanley Cup playoffs qualifying round
6	Carolina Hurricanes	68	38	25	5	27	222	193	+29	.596	Advance to 2020 Stanley Cup playoffs qualifying round
7	New York Islanders	68	35	23	10	24	192	193	−1	.588	Advance to 2020 Stanley Cup playoffs qualifying round
8	Toronto Maple Leafs	70	36	25	9	28	238	227	+11	.579	Advance to 2020 Stanley Cup playoffs qualifying round
9	Columbus Blue Jackets	70	33	22	15	25	180	187	−7	.579	Advance to 2020 Stanley Cup playoffs qualifying round
10	Florida Panthers	69	35	26	8	30	231	228	+3	.565	Advance to 2020 Stanley Cup playoffs qualifying round
11	New York Rangers	70	37	28	5	31	234	222	+12	.564	Advance to 2020 Stanley Cup playoffs qualifying round
12	Montreal Canadiens	71	31	31	9	19	212	221	−9	.500	Advance to 2020 Stanley Cup playoffs qualifying round
13	Buffalo Sabres	69	30	31	8	22	195	217	−22	.493	
14	New Jersey Devils	69	28	29	12	22	189	230	−41	.493	
15	Ottawa Senators	71	25	34	12	18	191	243	−52	.437	
16	Detroit Red Wings	71	17	49	5	13	145	267	−122	.275	

Source: National Hockey League

=== Western Conference ===
Pos	Team	GP	W	L	OTL	RW	GF	GA	GD	PCT	Qualification
1	St. Louis Blues	71	42	19	10	33	225	193	+32	.662	Advance to Seeding round-robin tournament
2	Colorado Avalanche	70	42	20	8	37	237	191	+46	.657	Advance to Seeding round-robin tournament
3	Vegas Golden Knights	71	39	24	8	30	227	211	+16	.606	Advance to Seeding round-robin tournament
4	Dallas Stars	69	37	24	8	26	180	177	+3	.594	Advance to Seeding round-robin tournament
5	Edmonton Oilers	71	37	25	9	31	225	217	+8	.585	Advance to 2020 Stanley Cup playoffs qualifying round
6	Nashville Predators	69	35	26	8	28	215	217	−2	.565	Advance to 2020 Stanley Cup playoffs qualifying round
7	Vancouver Canucks	69	36	27	6	27	228	217	+11	.565	Advance to 2020 Stanley Cup playoffs qualifying round
8	Calgary Flames	70	36	27	7	25	210	215	−5	.564	Advance to 2020 Stanley Cup playoffs qualifying round
9	Winnipeg Jets	71	37	28	6	30	216	203	+13	.563	Advance to 2020 Stanley Cup playoffs qualifying round
10	Minnesota Wild	69	35	27	7	30	220	220	0	.558	Advance to 2020 Stanley Cup playoffs qualifying round
11	Arizona Coyotes	70	33	29	8	26	195	187	+8	.529	Advance to 2020 Stanley Cup playoffs qualifying round
12	Chicago Blackhawks	70	32	30	8	23	212	218	−6	.514	Advance to 2020 Stanley Cup playoffs qualifying round
13	Anaheim Ducks	71	29	33	9	20	187	226	−39	.472	
14	Los Angeles Kings	70	29	35	6	21	178	212	−34	.457	
15	San Jose Sharks	70	29	36	5	22	182	226	−44	.450	

Source: National Hockey League

Tiebreaking procedures

1. Fewer number of games played (only used during regular season)
2. Greater number of regulation wins (denoted by RW)
3. Greater number of wins in regulation and overtime (excluding shootout wins; denoted by ROW)
4. Greater number of total wins (including shootouts)
5. Greater number of points earned in head-to-head play; if teams played an uneven number of head-to-head games, the result of the first game on the home ice of the team with the extra home game is discarded.
6. Greater goal differential (difference between goals for and goals against)
7. Greater number of goals scored (denoted by GF)

== Playoffs ==
=== Seeding round-robin ===
The top four teams in each conference played in a separate seeding round-robin to determine their seeding in the first round. These games were played with regular season overtime and shootout rules, with the clubs accumulating points like the regular season, and any ties in the round-robin standings were broken by the regular season points percentage.

Eastern Conference

Pos	Team	GP	W	L	OTL	PCT	GF	GA	GD	Pts	PHI	TBL	WSH	BOS
1	Philadelphia	3	3	0	0	0.645	11	3	+8	6	—	4–1	3–1	4–1
2	Tampa Bay	3	2	1	0	0.657	7	8	−1	4	1–4	—	3–2 (SO)	3–2
3	Washington	3	1	1	1	0.652	5	7	−2	3	1–3	2–3 (SO)	—	2–1
4	Boston	3	0	3	0	0.714	4	9	−5	0	1–4	2–3	1–2	—

Source: National Hockey League

Western Conference

Pos	Team	GP	W	L	OTL	PCT	GF	GA	GD	Pts	VGK	COL	DAL	STL
1	Vegas	3	3	0	0	0.606	15	10	+5	6	—	4–3 (OT)	5–3	6–4
2	Colorado	3	2	0	1	0.657	9	5	+4	5	3–4 (OT)	—	4–0	2–1
3	Dallas	3	1	2	0	0.594	5	10	−5	2	3–5	0–4	—	2–1 (SO)
4	St. Louis	3	0	2	1	0.662	6	10	−4	1	4–6	1–2	1–2 (SO)	—

Source: National Hockey League

=== Bracket ===
In each round, the highest remaining seed in each conference is matched against the lowest remaining seed. The higher-seeded team is awarded home ice advantage. In the Stanley Cup Final, home ice was determined based on regular season points percentage. Each best-of-five series followed a 2–2–1 format: the higher-seeded team was the designated as the host for games one and two (and game five, if necessary), and the lower-seeded team was the host for games three (and game four, if necessary). Each best-of-seven series followed a 2–2–1–1–1 format: the higher-seeded team was the host for games one and two (and games five and seven, if necessary), and the lower-seeded team was the host for games three and four (and game six, if necessary). In the First Round, the top four teams in each conference were seeded one through four based on their final standings from the Round-robin. The teams that advanced from the qualifying round were re-seeded five through eight based on their regular season points percentage.

Qualifying round
5	Pittsburgh	1
12	Montreal	3
6	Carolina	3
11	NY Rangers	0
Eastern Conference
7	NY Islanders	3
10	Florida	1
8	Toronto	2
9	Columbus	3
5	Edmonton	1
12	Chicago	3
6	Nashville	1
11	Arizona	3
Western Conference
7	Vancouver	3
10	Minnesota	1
8	Calgary	3
9	Winnipeg	1

First round
1	Philadelphia	4
8	Montreal	2
2	Tampa Bay	4
7	Columbus	1
3	Washington	1
6	NY Islanders	4
4	Boston	4
5	Carolina	1
1	Vegas	4
8	Chicago	1
2	Colorado	4
7	Arizona	1
3	Dallas	4
6	Calgary	2
4	St. Louis	2
5	Vancouver	4

Second round
1	Philadelphia	3
6	NY Islanders	4
2	Tampa Bay	4
4	Boston	1
1	Vegas	4
5	Vancouver	3
2	Colorado	3
3	Dallas	4

Conference finals
6	NY Islanders	2
2	Tampa Bay	4
1	Vegas	1
3	Dallas	4

Stanley Cup Final
E2	Tampa Bay	4
W3	Dallas	2

== Statistics ==
=== Scoring leaders ===
The following players led the league in regular season points at the completion of the regular season.

Player	Team	GP	G	A	Pts	+/–	PIM
Leon Draisaitl	Edmonton Oilers	71	43	67	110	–7	18
Connor McDavid	Edmonton Oilers	64	34	63	97	–6	28
David Pastrnak	Boston Bruins	70	48	47	95	+21	40
Artemi Panarin	New York Rangers	69	32	63	95	+36	20
Nathan MacKinnon	Colorado Avalanche	69	35	58	93	+13	12
Brad Marchand	Boston Bruins	70	28	59	87	+25	82
Nikita Kucherov	Tampa Bay Lightning	68	33	52	85	+26	38
Patrick Kane	Chicago Blackhawks	70	33	51	84	+8	40
Auston Matthews	Toronto Maple Leafs	70	47	33	80	+19	8
Jack Eichel	Buffalo Sabres	68	36	42	78	+5	34

=== Leading goaltenders ===
The following goaltenders led the league in regular season goals against average at the conclusion of games played on March 11, 2020, while playing at least 1,740 minutes.

Player	Team	GP	TOI	W	L	OTL	GA	SO	SV%	GAA
Tuukka Rask	Boston Bruins	41	2,401:47	26	8	6	85	5	.929	2.12
Darcy Kuemper	Arizona Coyotes	29	1,753:24	16	11	2	65	2	.928	2.22
Elvis Merzlikins	Columbus Blue Jackets	33	1,815:08	13	9	8	71	5	.923	2.35
Jaroslav Halak	Boston Bruins	31	1,833:22	18	6	6	73	3	.919	2.39
Pavel Francouz	Colorado Avalanche	34	1,914:26	21	7	4	77	1	.923	2.41
Carter Hart	Philadelphia Flyers	43	2,355:50	24	13	3	95	1	.914	2.42
Tristan Jarry	Pittsburgh Penguins	33	1,926:29	20	12	1	78	3	.921	2.43
Ben Bishop	Dallas Stars	44	2,473:49	21	16	4	103	2	.920	2.50
Andrei Vasilevskiy	Tampa Bay Lightning	52	3,121:54	35	14	3	133	3	.917	2.56
Jordan Binnington	St. Louis Blues	50	2,947:41	30	13	7	126	3	.912	2.56

== NHL awards ==
Due to the COVID-19 pandemic, the NHL did not hold an annual awards ceremony for this season. Instead, the individual awards were handed out during the final two rounds of the Stanley Cup playoffs. Voting concluded immediately after the end of the regular season. Statistics-based awards such as the Art Ross Trophy, Maurice "Rocket" Richard Trophy, William M. Jennings Trophy and the Presidents' Trophy are announced at the end of the regular season. The Prince of Wales Trophy and the Clarence S. Campbell Bowl are presented at the end of the Eastern and Western conference finals respectively. The Stanley Cup and the Conn Smythe Trophy are presented at the end of the Stanley Cup Final.

2019–20 NHL awards
Award	Recipient(s)	Runner(s)-up/Finalists
Presidents' Trophy (Best regular-season record)	Boston Bruins	St. Louis Blues
Prince of Wales Trophy (Eastern Conference playoff champion)	Tampa Bay Lightning	New York Islanders
Clarence S. Campbell Bowl (Western Conference playoff champion)	Dallas Stars	Vegas Golden Knights
Art Ross Trophy (Player with most points)	Leon Draisaitl (Edmonton Oilers)	Connor McDavid (Edmonton Oilers)
Bill Masterton Memorial Trophy (Perseverance, Sportsmanship, and Dedication)	Bobby Ryan (Ottawa Senators)	Stephen Johns (Dallas Stars); Oskar Lindblom (Philadelphia Flyers)
Calder Memorial Trophy (Best first-year player)	Cale Makar (Colorado Avalanche)	Quinn Hughes (Vancouver Canucks); Dominik Kubalik (Chicago Blackhawks)
Conn Smythe Trophy (Most valuable player, playoffs)	Victor Hedman (Tampa Bay Lightning)	Brayden Point (Tampa Bay Lightning)
Frank J. Selke Trophy (Defensive forward)	Sean Couturier (Philadelphia Flyers)	Patrice Bergeron (Boston Bruins); Ryan O'Reilly (St. Louis Blues)
Hart Memorial Trophy (Most valuable player, regular season)	Leon Draisaitl (Edmonton Oilers)	Nathan MacKinnon (Colorado Avalanche); Artemi Panarin (New York Rangers)
Jack Adams Award (Best coach)	Bruce Cassidy (Boston Bruins)	John Tortorella (Columbus Blue Jackets); Alain Vigneault (Philadelphia Flyers)
James Norris Memorial Trophy (Best defenceman)	Roman Josi (Nashville Predators)	John Carlson (Washington Capitals); Victor Hedman (Tampa Bay Lightning)
King Clancy Memorial Trophy (Leadership and humanitarian contribution)	Mathew Dumba (Minnesota Wild)	Henrik Lundqvist (New York Rangers); P. K. Subban (New Jersey Devils)
Lady Byng Memorial Trophy (Sportsmanship and excellence)	Nathan MacKinnon (Colorado Avalanche)	Auston Matthews (Toronto Maple Leafs); Ryan O'Reilly (St. Louis Blues)
Ted Lindsay Award (Outstanding player)	Leon Draisaitl (Edmonton Oilers)	Nathan MacKinnon (Colorado Avalanche); Artemi Panarin (New York Rangers)
Mark Messier Leadership Award (Leadership and community activities)	Mark Giordano (Calgary Flames)	N/A
Maurice "Rocket" Richard Trophy (Top goal-scorer)	Alexander Ovechkin (Washington Capitals); David Pastrnak (Boston Bruins)	Auston Matthews (Toronto Maple Leafs)
Jim Gregory General Manager of the Year Award (Top general manager)	Lou Lamoriello (New York Islanders)	Julien BriseBois (Tampa Bay Lightning); Jim Nill (Dallas Stars)
Vezina Trophy (Best goaltender)	Connor Hellebuyck (Winnipeg Jets)	Tuukka Rask (Boston Bruins); Andrei Vasilevskiy (Tampa Bay Lightning)
William M. Jennings Trophy (Goaltender(s) of team with fewest goals against)	Tuukka Rask and Jaroslav Halak (Boston Bruins)	Ben Bishop and Anton Khudobin (Dallas Stars)

=== All-Star teams ===
Position	First Team	Second Team	Position	All-Rookie
G	Connor Hellebuyck, Winnipeg Jets	Tuukka Rask, Boston Bruins	G	Elvis Merzlikins, Columbus Blue Jackets
D	John Carlson, Washington Capitals	Victor Hedman, Tampa Bay Lightning	D	Quinn Hughes, Vancouver Canucks
D	Roman Josi, Nashville Predators	Alex Pietrangelo, St. Louis Blues	D	Cale Makar, Colorado Avalanche
C	Leon Draisaitl, Edmonton Oilers	Nathan MacKinnon, Colorado Avalanche	F	Dominik Kubalik, Chicago Blackhawks
RW	David Pastrnak, Boston Bruins	Nikita Kucherov, Tampa Bay Lightning	F	Victor Olofsson, Buffalo Sabres
LW	Artemi Panarin, New York Rangers	Brad Marchand, Boston Bruins	F	Nick Suzuki, Montreal Canadiens

== Milestones ==
=== First games ===
The following is a list of notable players who played their first NHL game during the 2019–20 season, listed with their first team.

Player	Team	Notability
David Ayres	Carolina Hurricanes	Emergency backup goaltender, played 29 minutes for Carolina against Toronto on February 22. First EBUG in NHL history to be credited with a win.
Adam Fox	New York Rangers	James Norris Memorial Trophy winner, three-time NHL All-Star team, two-time NHL All-Star
Brandon Hagel	Chicago Blackhawks	One-time NHL All-Star team selection
Jack Hughes	New Jersey Devils	First overall pick in the 2019 draft, three-time NHL All-Star
Jason Robertson	Dallas Stars	Two-time NHL All-Star team selection, one-time NHL All-Star, NHL All-Rookie Team selection
Igor Shesterkin	New York Rangers	Vezina Trophy winner, one-time NHL All-Star team selection, two-time NHL All-Star
Nick Suzuki	Montreal Canadiens	Frank J. Selke Trophy winner, three-time NHL All-Star, NHL All-Rookie Team selection

=== Last games ===
Player	Team	Notability
Ben Bishop	Dallas Stars	Two-time NHL All-Star team selection, one-time NHL All-Star
Jay Bouwmeester	St. Louis Blues	Over 1,200 games played, two-time NHL All-Star, member of the Triple Gold Club
Colby Cave	Edmonton Oilers	Died on April 11 after suffering a brain bleed four days earlier
Corey Crawford	Chicago Blackhawks	Two-time William M. Jennings Trophy winner, two-time NHL All-Star
Trevor Daley	Detroit Red Wings	Over 1,000 games played
Deryk Engelland	Vegas Golden Knights	Mark Messier Leadership Award winner
Mike Green	Edmonton Oilers	Two-time NHL All-Star team selection, two-time NHL All-Star
Dan Hamhuis	Nashville Predators	Over 1,100 games played
Jimmy Howard	Detroit Red Wings	Three-time NHL All-Star
Henrik Lundqvist	New York Rangers	Vezina Trophy winner, two-time NHL All-Star team selection, five-time NHL All-Star, NHL All-Rookie Team selection, NHL 2010s All-Decade Team selection, led all European-born goalies in wins (459) and games played (887) at retirement
Brent Seabrook	Chicago Blackhawks	Over 1,100 games played, one-time NHL All-Star
Alexander Steen	St. Louis Blues	Over 1,000 games played
Justin Williams	Carolina Hurricanes	Over 1,200 games played, Conn Smythe Trophy winner, one-time NHL All-Star

=== Major milestones reached ===
- On October 8, 2019, Florida Panthers defenceman Keith Yandle became the fifth player in NHL history and the first American-born to play in 800 consecutive games.
- On October 12, 2019, Arizona Coyotes forward Phil Kessel played his 1,000th NHL game, becoming the 338th player to reach the mark.
- On October 20, 2019, Winnipeg Jets head coach Paul Maurice won his 700th game, becoming the seventh head coach to reach that mark.
- On November 3, 2019, Anaheim Ducks forward Ryan Getzlaf played his 1,000th NHL game, becoming the 339th player to reach the mark.
- On November 5, 2019, Boston Bruins defenceman Zdeno Chara played his 1,500th NHL game.
- On November 13, 2019, Dallas Stars forward Corey Perry played his 1,000th NHL game, becoming the 340th player to reach the mark.
- On November 16, 2019, Florida Panthers head coach Joel Quenneville won his 900th game, becoming the second coach in NHL history to reach the mark.
- On November 16, 2019, Los Angeles Kings forward Jeff Carter played his 1,000th NHL game, becoming the 341st player to reach the mark.
- On December 1, 2019, Edmonton Oilers forwards Connor McDavid and Leon Draisaitl became the first set of teammates to have 50 points in 29 games since Mario Lemieux, Jaromir Jagr and Ron Francis did so with the Pittsburgh Penguins in 1995–96.
- On December 1, 2019, Minnesota Wild forward Mikko Koivu played his 1,000th NHL game, becoming the 342nd player to reach the mark.
- On December 9, 2019, Washington Capitals equipment manager Craig "Woody" Leydig worked his 2,500th NHL game.
- On December 14, 2019, San Jose Sharks defenceman Marc-Edouard Vlasic played his 1,000th NHL game, becoming the 343rd player to reach the mark.
- On December 15, 2019, Minnesota Wild forward Eric Staal became the 89th player in NHL history to score 1,000 points.
- On December 20, 2019, Dallas Stars forward Joe Pavelski played his 1,000th NHL game, becoming the 344th player to reach the mark.
- On January 9, 2020, Nashville Predators goaltender Pekka Rinne became the 12th goaltender in NHL history to score a goal in an NHL game.
- On January 19, 2020, Chicago Blackhawks forward Patrick Kane became the 90th player in NHL history to score 1,000 points
- On February 1, 2020, Detroit Red Wings forward Valtteri Filppula played his 1,000th NHL game, becoming the 345th player to reach the mark.
- On February 1, 2020, St. Louis Blues forward Alexander Steen played his 1,000th NHL game, becoming the 346th player to reach the mark.
- On February 4, 2020, San Jose Sharks forward Joe Thornton became the 14th player to score 1,500 points.
- On February 7, 2020, Columbus Blue Jackets goaltender Elvis Merzlikins became the first rookie goaltender to have five shutouts in an eight-game span since Frank Brimsek (1938–39).
- On February 7, 2020, Minnesota Wild forward Zach Parise played his 1,000th NHL game, becoming the 347th player to reach the mark.
- On February 13, 2020, Dallas Stars forward Andrew Cogliano played his 1,000th NHL game, becoming the 348th player to reach the mark.
- On February 22, 2020, Washington Capitals forward Alexander Ovechkin scored his 700th career goal, becoming the eighth player to reach the mark.
- On August 11, 2020, Columbus Blue Jackets goaltender Joonas Korpisalo set a modern NHL record with 85 saves in a single game, surpassing Kelly Hrudey in 1987.
- On August 11, 2020, Columbus Blue Jackets defenceman Seth Jones set a modern NHL record of time on ice in a single playoff game, 65:06.
- On September 26, 2020, Dallas Stars forward Joe Pavelski scored his 61st playoff goal, surpassing Joe Mullen as the all-time playoff goal scorer by a United States-born player.

== Uniforms ==
- The Buffalo Sabres introduced a 50th-anniversary third jersey that is plain white, with old gold trim and navy blue lettering. It was the last season the team used navy blue; a royal blue jersey were introduced in 2020–21.
- The Carolina Hurricanes introduced a new road jersey, featuring the wordmark "Canes" written diagonally across the front. The jersey also incorporates the Hurricanes' secondary logo introduced by the team's alternate jersey during the previous season.
- The Los Angeles Kings introduced a 1990s throwback jersey for the 2019–20 season, which was inspired by the Kings' white home jersey worn from 1988 to 1998. The team was scheduled to wear the jersey twice during the season.
- The St. Louis Blues introduced a 1990s throwback jersey for the 2019–20 season, which was inspired by the Blues' blue road jersey worn from 1995 to 1998. The team was scheduled to wear the jersey in three home games during the season.
- The Vancouver Canucks, to coincide with the 50th anniversary of the franchise in the NHL, introduced updated home and away jerseys worn during the season, featuring a revised stick-in-rink shoulder logo and the removal of the radially arched "VANCOUVER" across the chest. The Canucks also wore brand new third jerseys for select games, featuring the updated stick-in-rink logo and striping based on their original 1970 uniforms. In addition, the Canucks wore their 1990s throwback jerseys for select games. The design was chosen via an online vote over two other throwback jersey options.

== Broadcast rights ==
This was the ninth season under the NHL's ten-year deal with NBC Sports and sixth season of its twelve-year Canadian rights deal with Sportsnet. This included Sportsnet's sub-licensing agreements to air Hockey Night in Canada games on CBC Television and French-language broadcasts on TVA Sports.

Both NBC Sports and Sportsnet celebrated International Women's Day on March 8, 2020, by featuring all-female broadcasting crews on their respective telecasts of St. Louis Blues–Chicago Blackhawks and Vegas Golden Knights–Calgary Flames.

On January 2, 2019, the Chicago Blackhawks agreed to an exclusive multi-year deal with NBC Sports Chicago beginning with the 2019–20 season, ending the team's broadcasts on WGN-TV.

Sinclair Broadcast Group and Entertainment Studios combined to purchase the former Fox Sports regional networks (FSN). Twelve of the NHL's 31 teams (Anaheim, Arizona, Carolina, Columbus, Dallas, Detroit, Los Angeles, Florida, Minnesota, Nashville, St. Louis, and Tampa Bay) carry their television broadcasts through FSN. FSN was one of the properties Fox Corporation's predecessor 21st Century Fox divested in its sale to The Walt Disney Company, but which The Walt Disney Company could not keep due to antitrust concerns. This was Entertainment Studios' first entry into sports, while Sinclair has had a sports operation since 2014 that currently distributes the free-to-air network Stadium and is concurrently expanding into the regional sports network business with its stakes in these networks, YES Network and the upcoming Chicago-based Marquee Sports Network. The FSN networks continued to temporarily use the Fox Sports name under a transitional license agreement while Sinclair explores rebranding options.

In August 2019, the Vegas Golden Knights agreed to a deal with Las Vegas broadcast television station KTNV-TV to locally televise all of the team's 2019 preseason games over-the-air.

In September 2019, the New York Islanders agreed to a two-year deal with WEPN-AM and WEPN-FM to broadcast a majority of their games. Since the two stations also broadcast New York Rangers and the NBA's New York Knicks games, WRHU of Hofstra University continued to be used by the Islanders as an overflow station.

This was the final season of Sportsnet's regional rights to the Calgary Flames and Edmonton Oilers. In December 2019, after having aired the first-ever NHL broadcast in the language earlier in the year, it was announced that the Aboriginal Peoples Television Network (APTN) would air six of Sportsnet's Hometown Hockey games per season in Plains Cree over the next three years.

== See also ==
- 2019–20 NHL transactions
- List of 2019–20 NHL Three Star Awards
- 2019–20 NHL suspensions and fines
- 2019 in sports
- 2020 in sports
- COVID-19 pandemic in Canada
- COVID-19 pandemic in the United States
- Impact of the COVID-19 pandemic on sports
