= 2018–19 NHL season =

National Hockey League season

- League: National Hockey League
- Sport: Ice hockey
- Duration: October 3, 2018 – June 12, 2019
- Games: 82
- Teams: 31
- TV partner(s): CBC, Sportsnet/SN1/SN360, Citytv, FX, TVA Sports (Canada); NBCSN, NBC, CNBC, USA (United States)

Draft
- Top draft pick: Rasmus Dahlin
- Picked by: Buffalo Sabres

Regular season
- Presidents' Trophy: Tampa Bay Lightning
- Season MVP: Nikita Kucherov (Lightning)
- Top scorer: Nikita Kucherov (Lightning)

Playoffs
- Playoffs MVP: Ryan O'Reilly (Blues)

Stanley Cup
- Champions: St. Louis Blues
- Runners-up: Boston Bruins

NHL seasons
- 2017–18 2019–20

The 2018–19 NHL season was the 102nd season of operation (101st season of play) of the National Hockey League. 31 teams competed in an 82-game regular season. The regular season began on October 3, 2018, and ended on April 6, 2019. The 2019 Stanley Cup playoffs began on April 10, 2019, and the Stanley Cup Final concluded on June 12, 2019, with the St. Louis Blues winning their first Stanley Cup in the Cup Final over the Boston Bruins in seven games.

== League business ==
=== Salary cap ===
On June 21, 2018, the National Hockey League Players' Association announced that the salary cap would be set at US$79.5 million per team for the 2018–19 season.

=== Rule changes ===
No major rule changes were implemented this season.

=== On-ice ads in the rink corners ===
After a trial during the 2018 All-Star Game and China games, the NHL began to allow teams to sell on-ice advertising placements in the corners of the rink. NHL chief revenue officer Keith Wachtel estimated that these new placements could provide up to US$10 million in additional revenue to teams per season. During the playoffs, these advertising areas will be controlled by the league.

=== Sports betting ===
On October 29, 2018, it was announced that MGM Resorts International would become the NHL's "official sports wagering partner" in the United States. This deal includes direct access to new forms of internal statistics data, as well as brand licensing agreements in relation to its sportsbooks, and came in the wake of a court ruling earlier in the year which declared the Professional and Amateur Sports Protection Act of 1992 (a U.S. law that forbade the legalization of sports betting outside of Nevada and other exempted states) to be unconstitutional.

=== Expansion ===
On December 4, 2018, NHL Commissioner Gary Bettman officially announced that the league had approved an expansion team in Seattle, later christened the Seattle Kraken, which is planned to begin play in the 2021–22 season. To accommodate the addition in 2021, the new team will be placed in the Pacific Division, while the Arizona Coyotes will be moved to the Central Division.

=== Draft ===
The 2018 NHL entry draft was held June 22 and 23, 2018. The Buffalo Sabres, by virtue of winning the draft lottery on April 28, held the first overall selection, using it to select defenceman Rasmus Dahlin.

=== Preseason games in China ===
Two preseason games were played in China. The Calgary Flames and Boston Bruins played one game (Calgary as home team) at the Shenzhen Universiade Sports Center in Shenzhen on September 15, 2018, and played another (Boston as home team) at Cadillac Arena in Beijing on September 19, 2018.

=== Preseason games in Europe ===
Two preseason games were played in Europe. The New Jersey Devils played against SC Bern at PostFinance Arena in Bern, Switzerland, on October 1, 2018. The Edmonton Oilers played against Kölner Haie at Lanxess Arena in Cologne, Germany, on October 3, 2018.

== Coaching changes ==
Coaching changes
Off-season
Team	2017–18 coach	2018–19 coach	Story / Accomplishments
Calgary Flames	Glen Gulutzan	Bill Peters	Gulutzan was fired on April 17, following the Flames' failure to make the playoffs. In two seasons, the Flames went 82–68–14 under Gulutzan. The Flames made the playoffs in Gulutzan's first season with the team before missing out the following year. On April 23, Peters was named the Flames' new head coach. He had coached the Carolina Hurricanes the previous four seasons.
Carolina Hurricanes	Bill Peters	Rod Brind'Amour	Peters resigned on April 20, following the Hurricanes' failure to make the playoffs. Under Peters the Hurricanes went 137–138–53 and missed the playoffs in all four seasons. On May 8, Brind'Amour, who had spent the previous seven years as an assistant coach for the Hurricanes, was named the Hurricanes' new head coach.
Dallas Stars	Ken Hitchcock	Jim Montgomery	Hitchcock retired from coaching on April 13, following the Stars' failure to make the playoffs to become a consultant for the franchise. The Stars went 319–186–60–20 under Hitchcock, winning the Stanley Cup in 1999, going back the following season, and winning the Presidents' Trophy twice. On May 4, Montgomery was named the Stars' new head coach. He previously coached the Denver Pioneers with whom he won the 2017 NCAA championship.
New York Islanders	Doug Weight	Barry Trotz	Weight was relieved of his duties by the Islanders on June 5, a few weeks after the hiring of Lou Lamoriello as the president of hockey operations for the Islanders. The Islanders went 59–49–14 under Weight in his one-and-a-half seasons as head coach, never making the playoffs. Weight would remain with the Islanders. On June 21, Trotz was hired as head coach, and was previously the head coach of the Nashville Predators and Washington Capitals with whom he won the Stanley Cup in 2018.
New York Rangers	Alain Vigneault	David Quinn	Vigneault was fired by the New York Rangers on April 7, hours after the team's last regular season game after failing to make the playoffs for the first time in nearly a decade and the second time since the 2004–05 NHL lockout. The Rangers went 226–147–37 under Vigneault, going to the Final in his first year as head coach and winning the Presidents' Trophy the following season. On May 23, Quinn was named the Rangers' new head coach. He previously served as the assistant coach for the Colorado Avalanche during the 2012–13 season.
Washington Capitals	Barry Trotz	Todd Reirden	Trotz resigned on June 18 amid speculation of a contract dispute that neither he nor the Capitals confirmed. In four seasons under Trotz, the Capitals went 205–89–34, won two Presidents' Trophies and won the 2018 Stanley Cup Final. On June 29, Reirden was named head coach by the Capitals. Reirden, in his first NHL head coach position, had been an assistant with the Capitals for all four seasons under Trotz.
In-season
Team	Outgoing coach	Incoming coach	Story / Accomplishments
Anaheim Ducks	Randy Carlyle	Bob Murray*	Carlyle was fired on February 10, 2019, after going 2–15–4 in their past 21 games and losing seven consecutive games. Carlyle, who had previously coached the Ducks between 2005 and 2011, was rehired at the start of the 2016–17 season and went 111–74–35 and made the playoff both years. Carlyle was 384–256–96 throughout his time with the Ducks and won the Stanley Cup in 2007. General manager Murray took over as interim head coach for the rest of the season.
Chicago Blackhawks	Joel Quenneville	Jeremy Colliton	Quenneville was fired on November 6, 2018, after starting the season 6–6–3. Quenneville had been the head coach of the team since 2008 and guided them to three Stanley Cups in 2010, 2013 and 2015, while also accumulating an overall record of 797–452–249 with the team. Jeremy Colliton, the head coach for the Rockford IceHogs, succeeded Quenneville as head coach of the Blackhawks.
Edmonton Oilers	Todd McLellan	Ken Hitchcock*	McLellan was fired on November 20, 2018, after starting the season 9–10–1. McLellan had been the Oilers' head coach since the 2015–16 season, leading the team to a 123–119–24 record and a playoff berth in 2016–17. Hitchcock, a head coach with the third most wins in the NHL, was hired out of his announced retirement to replace McLellan for the remainder of the season.
Los Angeles Kings	John Stevens	Willie Desjardins*	Stevens was fired on November 4, 2018, after starting the season 4–8–1. Under his only season as head coach of the Kings, Stevens led the team to a 45–29–8 record and a wild card playoff berth in 2017–18. Former Vancouver Canucks head coach Desjardins was named the interim head coach.
Ottawa Senators	Guy Boucher	Marc Crawford*	Boucher was fired on March 1, 2019, with the Senators having a 22–37–5 record and losing six consecutive games. Boucher had coached the Senators since the 2016–17 season with a record of 94–108–26 and making it to the conference finals in 2017. Crawford, who last coached the Dallas Stars, was named the interim head coach.
Philadelphia Flyers	Dave Hakstol	Scott Gordon*	Hakstol was fired on December 17, 2018, after starting the season 12–15–4. Hakstol served as head coach since the 2015–16 season, leading the team to a 134–101–42 record and two playoff appearances. Former New York Islanders head coach Gordon was named the interim head coach.
St. Louis Blues	Mike Yeo	Craig Berube*	Yeo was fired on November 19, 2018, after starting the season 7–9–3. Yeo had coached the Blues since February 1, 2017, leading the team to a 73–49–11 record and a playoff berth in 2016–17. Berube, who had served as assistant coach with the Blues since 2017, was named the interim head coach.

(*) Indicates interim.

== Front office changes ==
General managers
Off-season
Team	2017–18 GM	2018–19 GM	Story / Accomplishments
Minnesota Wild	Chuck Fletcher	Paul Fenton	Fletcher was fired by the Wild on April 23, shortly after their defeat in the first round of the playoffs. He had been the Wild's general manager since the start of the 2009–10 season. Fenton was hired as his replacement on May 21; he had previously held the same position with the American Hockey League's Milwaukee Admirals.
Toronto Maple Leafs	Lou Lamoriello	Kyle Dubas	On April 30, 2018, it was announced that Lou Lamoriello would not return as general manager. On May 11, 2018, assistant general manager Kyle Dubas was named his replacement.
New York Islanders	Garth Snow	Lou Lamoriello	Snow was fired by the Islanders on June 5, a few weeks after the hiring of Lou Lamoriello as the president of hockey operations for the Islanders. Snow had been the Islanders' general manager since the start of the 2006–07 season. Lamoriello replaced Snow as the Islanders' general manager.
Tampa Bay Lightning	Steve Yzerman	Julien BriseBois	Yzerman resigned on September 11, but remained with the Lightning in an advisory role for the last year of his contract. He was replaced by the Lightning's assistant general manager Julien BriseBois who had also served as the organization's AHL affiliate general manager since 2010. Under BriseBois, the Norfolk Admirals and Syracuse Crunch appeared in three Calder Cup finals and won one over his eight seasons.
In-season
Team	Outgoing GM	Incoming GM	Story / Accomplishments
Edmonton Oilers	Peter Chiarelli	Keith Gretzky	Chiarelli was fired as the Oilers' general manager on January 22, 2019, with the Oilers in seventh place in the Pacific Division. Chiarelli had been the general manager since 2015 and the Oilers had made the playoffs once during that time, advancing to the second round in 2017. On January 23, it was announced that Keith Gretzky had been named interim general manager for the Oilers.
Philadelphia Flyers	Ron Hextall	Chuck Fletcher	Hextall was fired as the Flyers' general manager on November 26, 2018, with the Flyers in last place in the Metropolitan Division. Hextall had been the general manager since 2014 and the Flyers had made the playoffs twice, never advancing past the first round. On December 3, it was announced that Chuck Fletcher had been named general manager for the Flyers.

Team presidents
Off-season
Team	2017–18 President	2018–19 President	Story / Accomplishments
Buffalo Sabres	Russ Brandon	Kim Pegula	Brandon, who served as team president while concurrently serving a similar position with the Buffalo Bills, resigned from both positions on May 1, 2018. He had spent three years as the Sabres' president. Pegula, the wife of owner Terrence Pegula, replaced Brandon in both positions, and became the only current female team president in the NHL. Brandon's departure was the first of several resignations and dismissals resulting from a downsizing of Pegula's executive payroll.

== Arena changes ==
- The New York Islanders moved half of their home schedule back to their previous home, the Nassau Veterans Memorial Coliseum, after the Barclays Center proved to be unsuitable as a full-time NHL venue. The Islanders continue to play the remaining half of their home schedule at the Barclays Center, an arrangement that lasted until 2021, when UBS Arena opened. In the Stanley Cup playoffs, the Islanders played their first round home games at the Nassau Coliseum and their second round home games at the Barclays Center.
- The St. Louis Blues' home arena was renamed from Scottrade Center to Enterprise Center on July 1, 2018, as part of a new naming rights agreement with Enterprise Rent-A-Car and its parent company Enterprise Holdings.
- The Toronto Maple Leafs' home arena was renamed from the Air Canada Centre to Scotiabank Arena on July 1, 2018, as part of a new naming rights agreement with Scotiabank.

== Regular season ==
The regular season began on October 3, 2018, and ended April 6, 2019. This season, the mandatory "bye week" that each team received was extended from five to seven days to also include All-Star Weekend. The regular season schedule was released on June 21.

=== International games ===
Three regular season games, branded as the NHL Global Series, were played in Europe. The Edmonton Oilers and New Jersey Devils played at the Scandinavium in Gothenburg, Sweden, on October 6, 2018. The Florida Panthers and Winnipeg Jets played two games at Hartwall Arena in Helsinki, Finland, on November 1 and 2, 2018.

=== Outdoor games ===
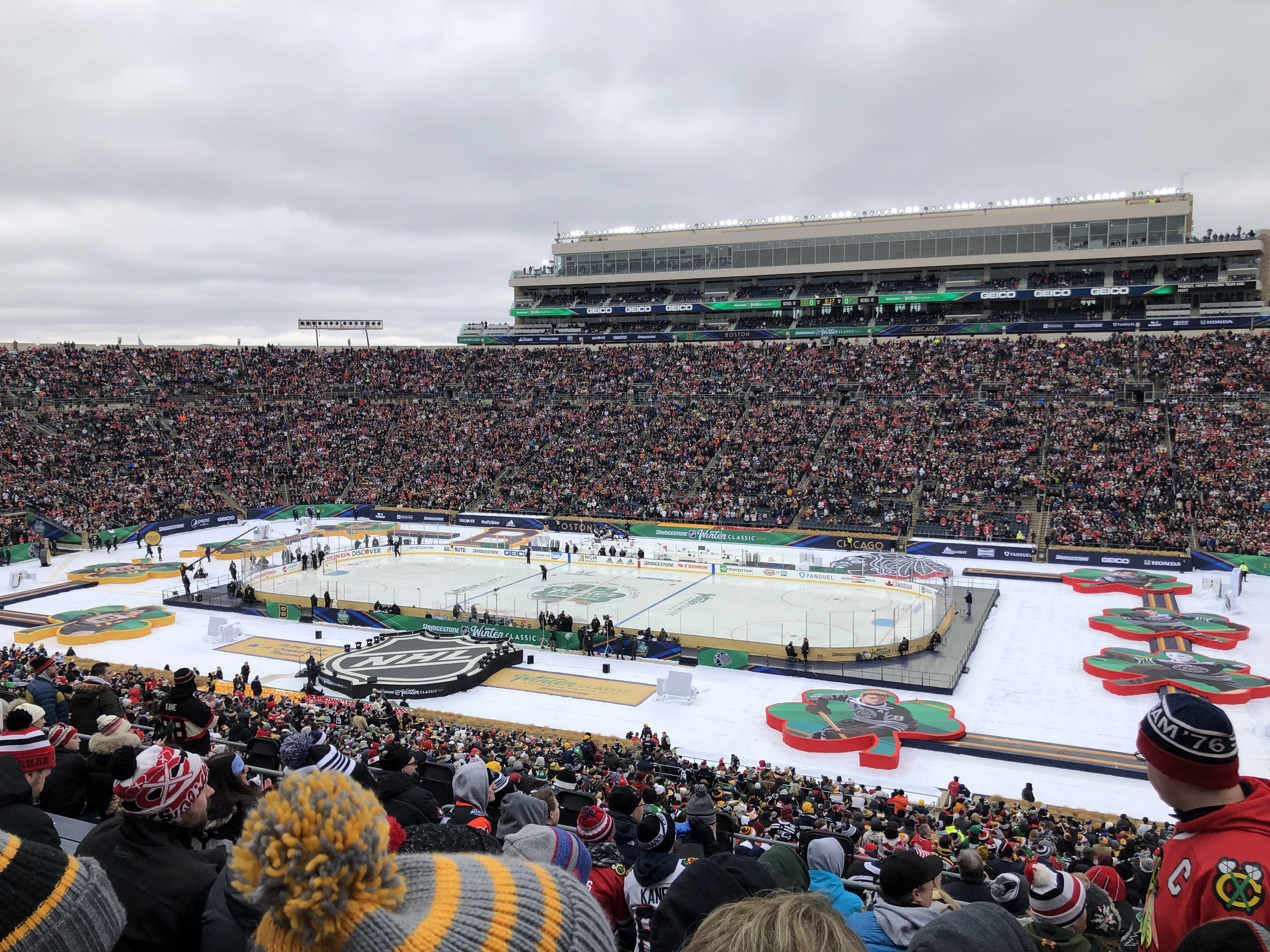
The 2019 NHL Winter Classic at Notre Dame Stadium saw the NHL return to Indiana for their sixth game hosting and the first in over 50 years.

- The Winter Classic was held on January 1, 2019, at Notre Dame Stadium in South Bend, Indiana, and featured the Chicago Blackhawks and the Boston Bruins.
- The NHL Stadium Series was held on February 23, 2019, at Lincoln Financial Field in Philadelphia, Pennsylvania, and featured the Pittsburgh Penguins and the Philadelphia Flyers.

=== All–Star Game ===
The 2019 National Hockey League All-Star Game was held in San Jose, California, at SAP Center, home of the San Jose Sharks, on January 26, 2019, the first time it was held on a Saturday after many years of the All-Star game being played on a Sunday.

== Standings ==
=== Eastern Conference ===
Top 3 (Metropolitan Division)
Pos	Team	GP	W	L	OTL	ROW	GF	GA	GD	Pts
1	y – Washington Capitals	82	48	26	8	44	278	249	+29	104
2	x – New York Islanders	82	48	27	7	43	228	196	+32	103
3	x – Pittsburgh Penguins	82	44	26	12	42	273	241	+32	100

Source: National Hockey League
x – Clinched playoff spot; y – Clinched division

Top 3 (Atlantic Division)
Pos	Team	GP	W	L	OTL	ROW	GF	GA	GD	Pts
1	p – Tampa Bay Lightning	82	62	16	4	56	325	222	+103	128
2	x – Boston Bruins	82	49	24	9	47	259	215	+44	107
3	x – Toronto Maple Leafs	82	46	28	8	46	286	251	+35	100

Source: National Hockey League
p – Clinched Presidents' Trophy; x – Clinched playoff spot

Eastern Conference Wild Card
Pos	Div	Team	GP	W	L	OTL	ROW	GF	GA	GD	Pts
1	ME	x – Carolina Hurricanes	82	46	29	7	44	245	223	+22	99
2	ME	x – Columbus Blue Jackets	82	47	31	4	45	258	232	+26	98
3	AT	Montreal Canadiens	82	44	30	8	41	249	236	+13	96
4	AT	Florida Panthers	82	36	32	14	33	267	280	−13	86
5	ME	Philadelphia Flyers	82	37	37	8	34	244	281	−37	82
6	ME	New York Rangers	82	32	36	14	26	227	272	−45	78
7	AT	Buffalo Sabres	82	33	39	10	28	226	271	−45	76
8	AT	Detroit Red Wings	82	32	40	10	29	227	277	−50	74
9	ME	New Jersey Devils	82	31	41	10	28	222	275	−53	72
10	AT	Ottawa Senators	82	29	47	6	29	242	302	−60	64

Source: National Hockey League
x – Clinched playoff spot

=== Western Conference ===
Top 3 (Central Division)
Pos	Team	GP	W	L	OTL	ROW	GF	GA	GD	Pts
1	y – Nashville Predators	82	47	29	6	43	240	214	+26	100
2	x – Winnipeg Jets	82	47	30	5	45	272	244	+28	99
3	x – St. Louis Blues	82	45	28	9	42	247	223	+24	99

Source: National Hockey League
x – Clinched playoff spot; y – Clinched division

Top 3 (Pacific Division)
Pos	Team	GP	W	L	OTL	ROW	GF	GA	GD	Pts
1	z – Calgary Flames	82	50	25	7	50	289	227	+62	107
2	x – San Jose Sharks	82	46	27	9	46	289	261	+28	101
3	x – Vegas Golden Knights	82	43	32	7	40	249	230	+19	93

Source: National Hockey League
x – Clinched playoff spot; z – Clinched conference

Western Conference Wild Card
Pos	Div	Team	GP	W	L	OTL	ROW	GF	GA	GD	Pts
1	CE	x – Dallas Stars	82	43	32	7	42	210	202	+8	93
2	CE	x – Colorado Avalanche	82	38	30	14	36	260	246	+14	90
3	PA	Arizona Coyotes	82	39	35	8	35	213	223	−10	86
4	CE	Chicago Blackhawks	82	36	34	12	33	270	292	−22	84
5	CE	Minnesota Wild	82	37	36	9	36	211	237	−26	83
6	PA	Vancouver Canucks	82	35	36	11	29	225	254	−29	81
7	PA	Anaheim Ducks	82	35	37	10	32	199	251	−52	80
8	PA	Edmonton Oilers	82	35	38	9	32	232	274	−42	79
9	PA	Los Angeles Kings	82	31	42	9	28	202	263	−61	71

Source: National Hockey League
x – Clinched playoff spot

Tie Breakers:
1. Fewer number of games played
2. Greater Regulation + OT Wins (ROW)
3. Greatest number of points earned in head-to-head play (If teams played an uneven number of head-to-head games, the result of the first game on the home ice of the team with the extra home game is discarded.)
4. Greater Goal differential

== Playoffs ==
=== Bracket ===
In each round, teams competed in a best-of-seven series following a 2–2–1–1–1 format (scores in the bracket indicate the number of games won in each best-of-seven series). The team with home ice advantage played at home for games one and two (and games five and seven, if necessary), and the other team was at home for games three and four (and game six, if necessary). The top three teams in each division made the playoffs, along with two wild cards in each conference, for a total of eight teams from each conference.

In the first round, the lower seeded wild card in each conference was played against the division winner with the best record while the other wild card was played against the other division winner, and both wild cards were de facto #4 seeds. The other series matched the second and third-place teams from the divisions. In the first two rounds, home ice advantage was awarded to the team with the better seed. In the conference finals and Stanley Cup Final, home ice advantage was awarded to the team with the better regular season record.

First round	Second round
A1	Tampa Bay	0
WC2	Columbus	4
WC2	Columbus	2
A2	Boston	4
A2	Boston	4
A3	Toronto	3
Eastern Conference
M1	Washington	3
WC1	Carolina	4
WC1	Carolina	4
M2	NY Islanders	0
M2	NY Islanders	4
M3	Pittsburgh	0
C1	Nashville	2
WC1	Dallas	4
WC1	Dallas	3
C3	St. Louis	4
C2	Winnipeg	2
C3	St. Louis	4
Western Conference
P1	Calgary	1
WC2	Colorado	4
WC2	Colorado	3
P2	San Jose	4
P2	San Jose	4
P3	Vegas	3

Conference finals
A2	Boston	4
WC1	Carolina	0
C3	St. Louis	4
P2	San Jose	2

Stanley Cup Final
A2	Boston	3
C3	St. Louis	4

== Statistics ==
=== Scoring leaders ===
The following players led the league in regular season points at the conclusion of games played on April 6, 2019.

Player	Team	GP	G	A	Pts	+/–	PIM
Nikita Kucherov	Tampa Bay Lightning	82	41	87	128	+24	62
Connor McDavid	Edmonton Oilers	78	41	75	116	+3	20
Patrick Kane	Chicago Blackhawks	81	44	66	110	+2	22
Leon Draisaitl	Edmonton Oilers	82	50	55	105	+2	52
Brad Marchand	Boston Bruins	79	36	64	100	+15	96
Sidney Crosby	Pittsburgh Penguins	79	35	65	100	+18	36
Nathan MacKinnon	Colorado Avalanche	82	41	58	99	+20	34
Johnny Gaudreau	Calgary Flames	82	36	63	99	+18	24
Steven Stamkos	Tampa Bay Lightning	82	45	53	98	+4	37
Aleksander Barkov	Florida Panthers	82	35	61	96	–3	8

=== Leading goaltenders ===
The following goaltenders led the league in regular season goals against average at the conclusion of games played on April 6, 2019, while playing at least 1,800 minutes.

Player	Team	GP	TOI	W	L	OTL	GA	SO	SV%	GAA
Jordan Binnington	St. Louis Blues	32	1,876:25	24	5	1	59	5	.927	1.89
Ben Bishop	Dallas Stars	46	2,637:18	27	15	2	87	7	.934	1.98
Robin Lehner	New York Islanders	46	2,615:49	25	13	5	93	6	.930	2.13
Thomas Greiss	New York Islanders	43	2,293:42	23	14	2	87	5	.927	2.28
Darcy Kuemper	Arizona Coyotes	55	3,251:15	27	20	8	126	5	.925	2.33
Jaroslav Halak	Boston Bruins	40	2,308:07	22	11	4	90	5	.922	2.34
Petr Mrazek	Carolina Hurricanes	40	2,386:51	23	14	3	95	4	.914	2.39
Andrei Vasilevskiy	Tampa Bay Lightning	53	3,203:45	39	10	4	128	6	.925	2.40
Pekka Rinne	Nashville Predators	56	3,219:44	30	19	4	130	4	.918	2.42
Tuukka Rask	Boston Bruins	46	2,635:09	27	13	5	109	4	.912	2.48

== NHL awards ==
The league's awards were presented at the NHL Awards ceremony, that was held following the 2019 Stanley Cup playoffs on June 19 at the Mandalay Bay Events Center. Finalists for voted awards were announced during the playoffs and winners were presented at the award ceremony. Voting concluded immediately after the end of the regular season. The Presidents' Trophy, the Prince of Wales Trophy and Clarence S. Campbell Bowl are not presented at the awards ceremony.

2018–19 NHL awards
Award	Recipient(s)	Runner(s)-up/Finalists
Presidents' Trophy (Best regular-season record)	Tampa Bay Lightning	Calgary Flames; Boston Bruins
Prince of Wales Trophy (Eastern Conference playoff champion)	Boston Bruins	Carolina Hurricanes
Clarence S. Campbell Bowl (Western Conference playoff champion)	St. Louis Blues	San Jose Sharks
Art Ross Trophy (Player with most points)	Nikita Kucherov (Tampa Bay Lightning)	Connor McDavid (Edmonton Oilers)
Bill Masterton Memorial Trophy (Perseverance, Sportsmanship, and Dedication)	Robin Lehner (New York Islanders)	Nick Foligno (Columbus Blue Jackets); Joe Thornton (San Jose Sharks)
Calder Memorial Trophy (Best first-year player)	Elias Pettersson (Vancouver Canucks)	Jordan Binnington (St. Louis Blues); Rasmus Dahlin (Buffalo Sabres)
Conn Smythe Trophy (Most valuable player, playoffs)	Ryan O'Reilly (St. Louis Blues)	Jordan Binnington (St. Louis Blues)
Frank J. Selke Trophy (Defensive forward)	Ryan O'Reilly (St. Louis Blues)	Patrice Bergeron (Boston Bruins); Mark Stone (Ottawa Senators/Vegas Golden Knights)
Hart Memorial Trophy (Most valuable player, regular season)	Nikita Kucherov (Tampa Bay Lightning)	Sidney Crosby (Pittsburgh Penguins); Connor McDavid (Edmonton Oilers)
Jack Adams Award (Best coach)	Barry Trotz (New York Islanders)	Craig Berube (St. Louis Blues); Jon Cooper (Tampa Bay Lightning)
James Norris Memorial Trophy (Best defenceman)	Mark Giordano (Calgary Flames)	Brent Burns (San Jose Sharks); Victor Hedman (Tampa Bay Lightning)
King Clancy Memorial Trophy (Leadership and humanitarian contribution)	Jason Zucker (Minnesota Wild)	Oliver Ekman-Larsson (Arizona Coyotes); Henrik Lundqvist (New York Rangers)
Lady Byng Memorial Trophy (Sportsmanship and excellence)	Aleksander Barkov (Florida Panthers)	Sean Monahan (Calgary Flames); Ryan O'Reilly (St. Louis Blues)
Ted Lindsay Award (Outstanding player)	Nikita Kucherov (Tampa Bay Lightning)	Patrick Kane (Chicago Blackhawks); Connor McDavid (Edmonton Oilers)
Mark Messier Leadership Award (Leadership and community activities)	Wayne Simmonds (Philadelphia Flyers/Nashville Predators)	Mark Giordano (Calgary Flames); Justin Williams (Carolina Hurricanes)
Maurice "Rocket" Richard Trophy (Top goal-scorer)	Alexander Ovechkin (Washington Capitals)	Leon Draisaitl (Edmonton Oilers)
NHL General Manager of the Year Award (Top general manager)	Don Sweeney (Boston Bruins)	Doug Armstrong (St. Louis Blues); Don Waddell (Carolina Hurricanes)
Vezina Trophy (Best goaltender)	Andrei Vasilevskiy (Tampa Bay Lightning)	Ben Bishop (Dallas Stars); Robin Lehner (New York Islanders)
William M. Jennings Trophy (Goaltender(s) of team with fewest goals against)	Robin Lehner and Thomas Greiss (New York Islanders)	Ben Bishop and Anton Khudobin (Dallas Stars)

=== All-Star teams ===
Position	First Team	Second Team	Position	All-Rookie
G	Andrei Vasilevskiy, Tampa Bay Lightning	Ben Bishop, Dallas Stars	G	Jordan Binnington, St. Louis Blues
D	Brent Burns, San Jose Sharks	John Carlson, Washington Capitals	D	Rasmus Dahlin, Buffalo Sabres
D	Mark Giordano, Calgary Flames	Victor Hedman, Tampa Bay Lightning	D	Miro Heiskanen, Dallas Stars
C	Connor McDavid, Edmonton Oilers	Sidney Crosby, Pittsburgh Penguins	F	Anthony Cirelli, Tampa Bay Lightning
RW	Nikita Kucherov, Tampa Bay Lightning	Patrick Kane, Chicago Blackhawks	F	Elias Pettersson, Vancouver Canucks
LW	Alexander Ovechkin, Washington Capitals	Brad Marchand, Boston Bruins	F	Brady Tkachuk, Ottawa Senators

== Milestones ==
=== First games ===
The following is a list of notable players who played their first NHL game during the 2018–19 season, listed with their first team. Asterisk(*) marks debut in playoffs.

Player	Team	Notability
Mackenzie Blackwood	New Jersey Devils	William M. Jennings Trophy winner
Evan Bouchard	Edmonton Oilers	One-time NHL All-Star team selection
Rasmus Dahlin	Buffalo Sabres	First overall pick in the 2018 draft, one-time NHL All-Star team selection, three-time NHL All-Star, NHL All-Rookie Team selection
Quinn Hughes	Vancouver Canucks	James Norris Memorial Trophy winner, one-time NHL All-Star team selection, two-time NHL All-Star, NHL All-Rookie Team selection
Cale Makar*	Colorado Avalanche	2019–20 Calder Memorial Trophy winner, two-time James Norris Memorial Trophy winner, Conn Smythe Trophy winner, six-time NHL All-Star team selection, three-time NHL All-Star, NHL All-Rookie Team selection
Elias Pettersson	Vancouver Canucks	2018–19 Calder Memorial Trophy winner, four-time NHL All-Star, NHL All-Rookie Team selection

=== Last games ===
Player	Team	Notability
Dustin Byfuglien	Winnipeg Jets	Four-time NHL All-Star
Matt Cullen	Pittsburgh Penguins	Over 1,500 career games played, oldest active player in NHL at time of retirement
Daniel Girardi	Tampa Bay Lightning	NHL record for blocked shots at time of retirement
Ryan Kesler	Anaheim Ducks	Frank J. Selke Trophy winner, over 1,000 games played, two-time NHL All-Star
Chris Kunitz	Chicago Blackhawks	Over 1,000 career games played, one-time NHL All-Star team selection
Roberto Luongo	Florida Panthers	William M. Jennings Trophy winner, 489 career games won, over 1,000 career games played, two-time NHL All-Star team selection, six-time NHL All-Star
Brooks Orpik	Washington Capitals	Over 1,000 career games played
Dion Phaneuf	Los Angeles Kings	Over 1,000 career games played, one-time NHL All-Star team selection, three-time NHL All-Star
Tomas Plekanec	Montreal Canadiens	Over 1,000 career games played
Thomas Vanek	Detroit Red Wings	Over 1,000 career games played, one-time NHL All-Star team selection
Cam Ward	Carolina Hurricanes	Conn Smythe Trophy winner, one-time NHL All-Star

=== Major milestones reached ===
- On October 3, 2018, Montreal Canadiens forward Jesperi Kotkaniemi became the first player born in the 2000s to play in one of the four major professional sports leagues in the United States and Canada.
- On October 13, 2018, Chicago Blackhawks defenceman Duncan Keith played his 1,000th game, becoming the 323rd player to reach the mark.
- On October 15, 2018, Montreal Canadiens forward Tomas Plekanec played his 1,000th game, becoming the 324th player to reach the mark.
- On October 16, 2018, Edmonton Oilers forward Connor McDavid broke his first NHL record, by contributing to, either by scoring or assisting on all of the first nine goals scored by his team in the regular season. The record was previously held by Adam Oates, who contributed to the first seven goals scored by the Detroit Red Wings in 1986–87.
- On October 19, 2018, Minnesota Wild forward Eric Staal played his 1,100th game.
- On October 25, 2018, Minnesota Wild defenceman Ryan Suter played his 1,000th game, becoming the 325th player to reach the mark.
- On October 30, 2018, Dallas Stars forward Jason Spezza played his 1,000th game, becoming the 326th player to reach the mark.
- On November 1, 2018, Buffalo Sabres forward Jason Pominville played his 1,000th game, becoming the 327th player to reach the mark.
- On November 1, 2018, Toronto Maple Leafs defenceman Ron Hainsey played his 1,000th game, becoming the 328th player to reach the mark.
- On November 8, 2018, San Jose Sharks forward Joe Thornton played his 1,500th game, becoming the 19th player to reach the mark.
- On November 17, 2018, Los Angeles Kings defenceman Dion Phaneuf played his 1,000th game, becoming the 329th player to reach the mark.
- On November 17, 2018, New York Rangers goaltender Henrik Lundqvist recorded his 438th win, surpassing Jacques Plante for seventh place in wins.
- On November 21, 2018, Nashville Predators goaltender Pekka Rinne recorded his 320th win, surpassing Miikka Kiprusoff for the most wins by a Finnish-born goaltender.
- On December 15, 2018, Montreal Canadiens head coach Claude Julien got his 600th win, becoming the 18th coach in league history to reach the mark.
- On December 20, 2018, Montreal Canadiens goaltender Carey Price recorded his 300th win, becoming the 35th goaltender to reach the mark.
- On December 23, 2018, Detroit Red Wings defenceman Trevor Daley played his 1,000th game, becoming the 330th player to reach the mark.
- On December 27, 2018, San Jose Sharks defenceman Brent Burns played his 1,000th game, becoming the 331st player to reach the mark.
- On January 4, 2019, Detroit Red Wings forward Thomas Vanek played his 1,000th game, becoming the 332nd player to reach the mark.
- On January 5, 2019, Los Angeles Kings goaltender Jonathan Quick recorded his 300th win, becoming the 36th goaltender to reach the mark.
- On January 10, 2019, Columbus Blue Jackets head coach John Tortorella got his 600th win, becoming the 19th and the first United States-born coach to reach the mark.
- On January 14, 2019, Washington Capitals defenceman Brooks Orpik played his 1,000th game, becoming the 333rd player to reach the mark.
- On January 21, 2019, Nashville Predators head coach Peter Laviolette got his 600th win, becoming the 20th and the second United States-born coach to reach the mark.
- On February 3, 2019, Boston Bruins goaltender Tuukka Rask earned his 253rd win, becoming the goaltender with most wins in Bruins franchise history.
- On February 5, 2019, Boston Bruins forward Patrice Bergeron played his 1,000th game, becoming the 334th player to reach the mark.
- On February 5, 2019, Washington Capitals forward Alexander Ovechkin scored his 1,180 point, surpassing Sergei Fedorov to become the leading Russia-born scorer in NHL history.
- On February 5, 2019, Winnipeg Jets head coach Paul Maurice coached his 1,500th game, becoming the sixth coach and the youngest in NHL history to reach the mark.
- On February 9, 2019, Montreal Canadiens goaltender Carey Price played his 600th game, becoming the 49th goaltender to reach the mark.
- On February 14, 2019, Chicago Blackhawks forward Chris Kunitz played his 1,000th game, becoming the 335th player to reach the mark.
- On February 14, 2019, San Jose Sharks forward Joe Thornton surpassed Teemu Selanne for 15th on the NHL's all-time scoring leaders list
- On February 19, 2019, Ottawa Senators goaltender Craig Anderson played his 600th game, becoming the 50th goaltender to reach the mark.
- On March 1, 2019, the Philadelphia Flyers set an NHL record by using eight goaltenders in one season (Brian Elliott, Calvin Pickard, Michal Neuvirth, Alex Lyon, Anthony Stolarz, Carter Hart, Mike McKenna and Cam Talbot).
- On March 5, 2019, Anaheim Ducks forward Ryan Kesler played his 1,000th game, becoming the 336th player to reach the mark.
- On March 5, 2019, New York Islanders head coach Barry Trotz got his 800th win, becoming the fourth coach to reach the mark.
- On March 5, 2019, Pittsburgh Penguins forward Matt Cullen played his 1,500th game, becoming the 20th player to reach the mark.
- On March 5, 2019, the Tampa Bay Lightning became the first team in NHL history to have multiple goaltenders (Andrei Vasilevskiy and Louis Domingue), each with a winning streak of 10 or more games in a season.
- On March 11, 2019, the Tampa Bay Lightning became the seventh team in NHL history to have 110 points through 70 games.
- On March 12, 2019, Montreal Canadiens goaltender Carey Price recorded his 315th win, surpassing Jacques Plante to become the goaltender with most wins in Canadiens franchise history.
- On March 12, 2019, Pittsburgh Penguins forward Evgeni Malkin scored his 1,000th point, becoming the 88th player to reach the mark.
- On March 21, 2019, Tampa Bay Lightning head coach Jon Cooper earned his 300th win in his 500th game.
- On March 28, 2019, Los Angeles Kings goaltender Jonathan Quick played his 600th game, becoming the 51st goaltender to reach the mark.
- On April 1, 2019, Los Angeles Kings forward Anze Kopitar played his 1,000th game, becoming the 337th player to reach the mark.
- On April 5, 2019, Washington Capitals forward Alexander Ovechkin won the eighth Maurice "Rocket" Richard Trophy of his career, surpassing Phil Esposito to become the player with the most goal-scoring titles in NHL history.
- On April 6, 2019, San Jose Sharks head coach Peter DeBoer got his 400th win, becoming the 38th head coach to reach the mark.
- On April 6, 2019, Tampa Bay Lightning forward Nikita Kucherov scored his 128th point, surpassing Alexander Mogilny to become the Russian-born leading scorer in a single season.

== Uniforms ==
- The Anaheim Ducks wore a new third jersey inspired by the uniforms from their years as the Mighty Ducks of Anaheim from 1993 to 2006.
- The Arizona Coyotes wore the "Kachina" jersey as the team's new third uniform. They previously used this design for road games from 1996 to 2003.
- The Calgary Flames wore their 2009–2013 and 2016–17 third jersey, which is a throwback to their red jersey used from 1980 to 1994.
- The Carolina Hurricanes wore a new black third jersey, which was inspired by the third uniform used from 2008 to 2017. The team also announced that they would wear a heritage uniform on two occasions versus the Boston Bruins, which was inspired by the jerseys worn by their predecessor, the Hartford Whalers, from 1985 to 1989 and during the 1990–91 season. The goal song "Brass Bonanza" and Pucky the Whale from the Hartford Whalers also appeared in the games.
- The Colorado Avalanche wore a new third jersey, which was inspired by the third uniform used during the 2015–16 season.
- The Columbus Blue Jackets brought back the "cannon" jersey, which was worn from 2010 to 2017.
- The Edmonton Oilers wore their classic royal blue jersey as their alternate uniform this season dubbed the "retro jersey". It was used four times this season.
- The Los Angeles Kings wore silver third jerseys, inspired by the uniforms worn during the 2016–17 season as part of their 50th anniversary, with gold accents being changed to silver.
- The New Jersey Devils, who had worn red heritage jerseys with their original 1982 red and green design in select games from 2010 to 2017, introduced a new white heritage jersey, to be worn in four games.
- The New York Islanders wore new blue third jerseys, partially inspired by their third jersey from the 2014–15 season.
- The Ottawa Senators wore red third jerseys, which were worn during the NHL 100 Classic.
- The Philadelphia Flyers wore black third jerseys, which were worn in the 2017 Stadium Series.
- The Pittsburgh Penguins wore yellow third jerseys inspired by the uniforms worn by the team in the 1980s and during the 2017 Stadium Series.
- The San Jose Sharks wore new black third jerseys, dubbed the "Stealth" jersey, during select home games.
- The St. Louis Blues wore third jerseys, which are based on the bright blue uniforms worn during the 2017 Winter Classic.
- The Tampa Bay Lightning wore new black third jerseys during select home games.
- The Washington Capitals brought back their 2015-2017 third jerseys, which are based on the uniforms worn from 1974 to 1995.
- The Winnipeg Jets wore a new "aviator blue" third jersey featuring a script wordmark, and striping inspired by the uniforms worn by the original Winnipeg Jets from 1990 to 1996. Additionally, the team announced they would wear heritage uniforms previously worn during the 2016 NHL Heritage Classic.

== Broadcast rights ==
This was the eighth season under the NHL's ten year U.S. rights deal with NBC Sports and fifth season of its twelve-year Canadian rights deals with Sportsnet and TVA Sports. On December 20, 2017, CBC Television and Rogers Communications struck an agreement to renew its sublicensing agreement for Hockey Night in Canada through the end of Rogers's current broadcast contract. The two sides had previously reached an agreement to extend its original four-year agreement by an additional year. Rogers announced the retirement of long-time commentator Bob Cole from Hockey Night, after calling a limited schedule of games.

Through BAMTech's prior 2015 agreement to run NHL.tv and the league's other digital properties, the subscription streaming service ESPN+ began offering up to 180 regular season games.

Three teams shifted their radio broadcast rights exclusively to internet radio, all of which in heavily crowded large media markets with multiple sports teams seeking a limited number of radio outlets. The Los Angeles Kings "Audio Network" will now be exclusively carried on iHeartRadio. The New Jersey Devils and New York Islanders have a broadcast agreement with Entercom for the New York City market that will see only a limited number of games broadcast on their flagship sports station, WFAN, with the rest being carried on the company's Radio.com platform (the university radio station WRHU remains the Islanders' radio flagship). WFAN had already carried only a limited number of games from those teams in recent seasons, previously pawning off the remainder on other non-sports stations such as WNYM.

In an effort to expand the league's television audience in Europe, the NHL began to schedule more weekend afternoon games (the "European Game of the Week") so they could air live during the primetime hours. The initiative launched with an NHL Global Series game in Gothenburg, Sweden, on October 6, 2018.

== See also ==
- 2018–19 NHL transactions
- 2018–19 NHL suspensions and fines
- List of 2018–19 NHL Three Star Awards
- 2018 in sports
- 2019 in sports
