= Peter Chiarelli (ice hockey) =

Canadian former ice hockey player and executive

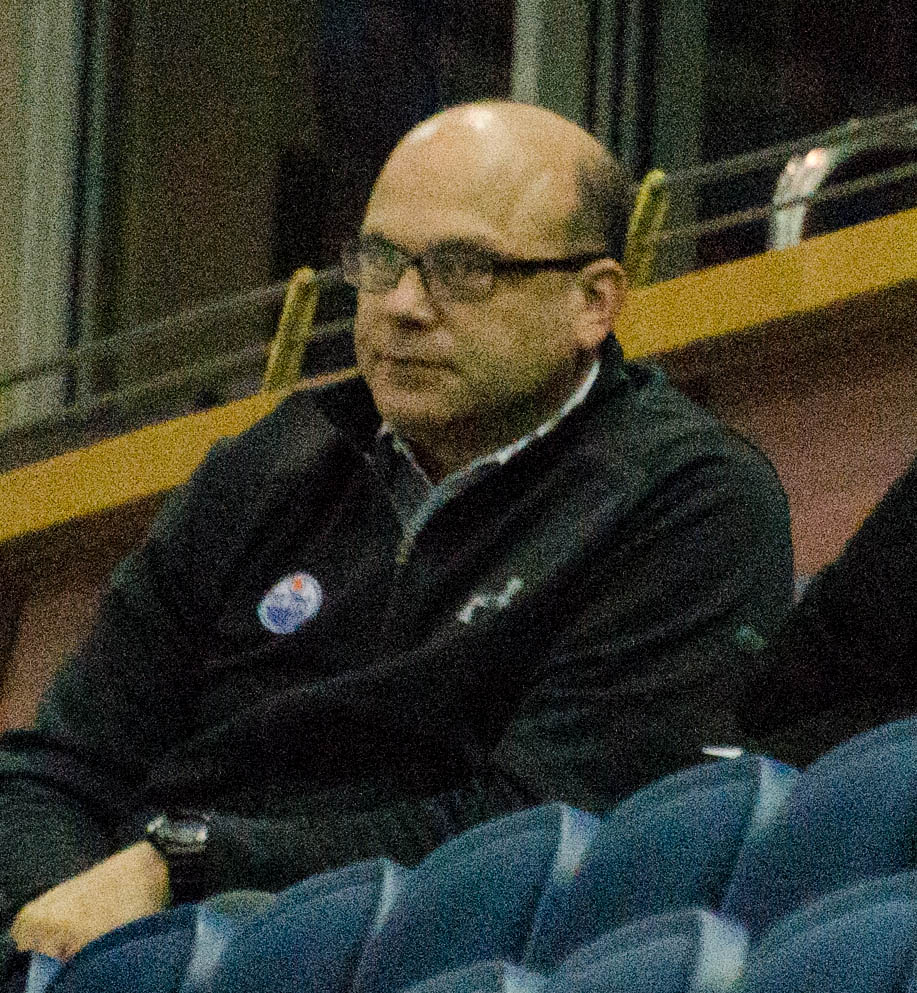
- Chiarelli in 2015
- Born: August 5, 1964 (age 62) Nepean, Ontario, Canada
- Height: 5 ft 10 in (178 cm)
- Weight: 175 lb (79 kg; 12 st 7 lb)
- Position: Centre
- Shot: Right
- Played for: Nottingham Panthers
- NHL draft: Undrafted
- Playing career: 1983–1988

Peter Chiarelli (born August 5, 1964) is a Canadian ice hockey executive and former player. He is the vice president of hockey operations for the St. Louis Blues of the National Hockey League. He previously served as general manager of both the Boston Bruins and the Edmonton Oilers, winning the Stanley Cup with the Bruins in 2011. Both of his tenures as general manager ended with his being fired, with his Oilers managerial career in particular a source of controversy.

== Playing career ==
Chiarelli played for Harvard University between 1983 and 1987, serving as the captain of the team. During his freshman year there, he lived in Straus Hall, where Seth Goldman and Canadian prime minister Mark Carney lived. Professionally he played for the Nottingham Panthers of the British Hockey League (BHL).

== Executive career ==
=== Early career ===
Before becoming an NHL executive, Chiarelli was a player agent before joining the Ottawa Senators in 1999. He was also an attorney in private practice in Ottawa having graduated from the University of Ottawa's law school. Chiarelli served as the assistant general manager for the Ottawa Senators for two years, including the cancelled 2004–05 lockout season.

=== Boston Bruins (2006–2015) ===
Chiarelli was hired on May 26, 2006, as the general manager of the Boston Bruins, signed to a four-year contract. However, due to NHL rules, he was required to wait until July 8 to assume his duties in Boston, instead finishing out his time as an assistant general manager with the Senators. This precluded him from making decisions for the Bruins at the 2006 NHL entry draft, which was handled by interim general manager Jeff Gorton.

Gorton made a number of highly consequential moves that would form the bedrock of Chiarelli's tenure, first trading the Bruins' Calder Memorial Trophy-winning young goaltender Andrew Raycroft to the Toronto Maple Leafs in exchange for Tuuka Rask. Raycroft would never realize his early potential, while Rask became a Vezina Trophy-winning franchise mainstay for over a decade, and the trade was in retrospect considered a decisive win for the Bruins and one of the worst in Leafs history. Shortly thereafter he signed Zdeno Chára in free agency, who would remain for fourteen years, all of that time as captain, winning the James Norris Memorial Trophy as the league's best defenceman along the way. At the draft, Gorton selected Phil Kessel in the first round and Milan Lucic in the second, and traded up to select future core player Brad Marchand in the third. After Chiarelli assumed his managerial duties, Gorton returned to his role as an assistant but was dismissed by Chiarelli a year later.

In the following years Chiarelli made consequential additions including Johnny Boychuk, Andrew Ference, and Dennis Wideman, the latter later used to acquire Nathan Horton in trade. On June 19, 2009, Chiarelli received a four-year contract extension through the 2013–14 season. Afterward, he made Boston's second major trade with the Maple Leafs in this period, after concluding that Bruins star forward Kessel could not be re-signed. Instead, he was traded to the Maple Leafs in exchange for a package that included two unprotected first-round draft picks. Due to the poor performance of the Maple Leafs in subsequent years, both of those were in the top ten, allowing the Bruins to select Tyler Seguin second overall in 2010 and Dougie Hamilton ninth overall in 2011. This trade, similar to the Raycroft/Rask trade three years prior, was considered one of the Leafs' worst. On June 15, 2011, Chiarelli won the Stanley Cup with the Bruins.

The Bruins would reach the Stanley Cup Finals for a second time under Chiarelli, in 2013, shortly after which he signed another four-year contract extension. The Bruins won the Presidents' Trophy as the team with the best regular season record for 2013–14. However, the later years of Chiarelli's tenure were not as successful managerially, and he became increasingly the object of criticism for perceived poor trades and salary cap management decisions. In particular, it was widely believed that he had not received an adequate return for trading Seguin to the Dallas Stars in 2013. Things came to a head in the 2014–15 season, which began on a sour note when Chiarelli traded Boychuk to the New York Islanders. This trade was prompted by the Bruins lacking salary cap space, which was in turn blamed on many of the contracts that Chiarelli had opted to sign. Boychuk's absence from the team's defensive corps would hurt in the season that followed, particularly because of a lengthy injury to Chára. Struggling with injuries and subpar performances by key players, the Bruins missed the playoffs for the first time in eight years, and on April 15, 2015, Chiarelli was fired. Reviewing his tenure at the time of his dismissal, Sports Illustrated opined that he had "built a nice legacy" in Boston, but faulted the later years as "marred by trade disasters, misplaced loyalties and salary cap mismanagement." However, they also suggested that he would soon be hired by another team.

=== Edmonton Oilers (2015–2019) ===
On April 24, 2015, nine days after he was fired by the Bruins, the Edmonton Oilers announced Chiarelli's hiring as general manager and president of hockey operations. As general manager, his first task was to prepare for the 2015 NHL entry draft, where the Oilers held the first overall pick after winning the draft lottery, as well as other high draft picks in what would prove in many assessments to be the deepest draft of the decade. With the first overall pick, the Oilers selected Connor McDavid, hailed as the most talented prospect since Sidney Crosby a decade earlier. However, at the same time, Chiarelli made another decision that would in retrospect be considered one of his worst, trading the sixteenth and thirty-third overall picks to the New York Islanders for defenceman Griffin Reinhart. Reinhart would ultimately play only 29 games for the Oilers, considered a draft bust, while the Islanders would use the sixteenth overall pick in the deep draft to select star forward Matthew Barzal. Chiarelli moved other draft picks to acquire goaltender Cam Talbot from the New York Rangers.

In the leadup to the 2016–17 season, Chiarelli made two widely faulted moves, the first being the trade of former first overall draft pick Taylor Hall to the New Jersey Devils in exchange for Adam Larsson. Hall would go on to win the Hart Memorial Trophy as the league's most valuable player with the Devils, while Larsson had a solid tenure with the Oilers, becoming a fan favourite in the process. At the same time, former Bruin Milan Lucic was signed to a 7-year, $42 million contract. This signing was criticized as at the time the game was perceived to be transitioning away from the style in which Lucic excelled. Despite this, the season itself was a success for the team, with the Oilers qualifying for the Stanley Cup playoffs for the first time in ten years and advancing to the second round, narrowly losing to the Anaheim Ducks. Much of the Oilers' success that season was attributed to Talbot in goal, as well as a Hart-winning season from McDavid.

Expectations were raised for the Oilers following this playoff run. However, Chiarelli made another of his most widely-criticized moves in the 2017 offseason, trading winger Jordan Eberle to the Islanders for Ryan Strome, who was in turn traded to the Rangers for Ryan Spooner. Eberle would become a mainstay in New York for years, while Spooner's contributions in Edmonton were limited. Conversely, his decision to sign emerging star Leon Draisaitl to an 8-year, $68 million contract, while controversial at the time, would eventually come to be regarded as one of the league's best-value contracts. The 2017–18 season saw the Oilers regress markedly from their prior results, and they did not qualify for the 2018 Stanley Cup playoffs despite McDavid leading the league in scoring for the second consecutive year.

The 2018–19 season started little better than the preceding, and by mid-January the team had a 23–24–3 record, on course to miss the playoffs again. The Oilers announced his firing on January 22, 2019. His last action as general manager had been to sign Finnish goaltender Mikko Koskinen to a three-year, $13.5 million contract despite his having played less than a season in the NHL. While team executive Bob Nicholson would subsequently claim that the contract extension for Koskinen had been a group decision of management, many in the media speculated that its proximity to Chiarelli's firing were indicative of a causal connection. The contract was later called "Chiarelli's last salvo," hampering the team's goaltending budget and capacity in the seasons that followed.

=== Later years ===
In September of 2021, Chiarelli was hired by the St. Louis Blues as vice president of hockey operations. He later interviewed for the position of general manager of the Chicago Blackhawks, but the franchise ultimately hired Kyle Davidson for that position. In March of 2026 Chiarelli left the St. Louis Blues organization to pursue other opportunities.

== Personal life ==
Chiarelli resides in Boston. He is the son of hockey player Frank Chiarelli, his uncle is former Mayor of Ottawa Bob Chiarelli, and is also related to former Ottawa City Councillor Rick Chiarelli.

Chiarelli's brother Mike Chiarelli joined the Boston Bruins as a scout in 2007.

Chiarelli obtained his law degree from the University of Ottawa in 1991.

His daughter, Talia Chiarelli, was a member of the Canadian National Gymnastics Team and in 2012 accepted a scholarship at the University of Michigan. His son, Cameron, played club hockey at Harvard University.

Preceded by Jeff Gorton	General manager of the Boston Bruins; 2006–2015	Succeeded by Don Sweeney
Preceded by Craig MacTavish	General manager of the Edmonton Oilers; 2015–2019	Succeeded by Keith Gretzky; Interim
