= Stan Bowman =

Canadian ice hockey businessman (born 1973)

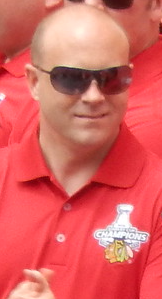
- Bowman in June 2015
- Born: Stanley Glenn Bowman; June 28, 1973 (age 53); Montreal, Quebec, Canada
- Spouse: Suzanne
- Children: 3
- Relatives: Scotty Bowman (father)

Stanley Glenn Bowman (born June 28, 1973) is a Canadian-American ice hockey executive, currently serving as the general manager of the Edmonton Oilers of the National Hockey League (NHL). He previously worked as the general manager of the Chicago Blackhawks of NHL and the U.S. Olympic men's hockey team. He is the son of Hockey Hall of Fame member and former senior advisor for the Blackhawks, Scotty Bowman.

Bowman was the general manager of the Blackhawks from 2009 to 2021, during which time the team won three Stanley Cups in 2010, 2013, and 2015. He resigned from his position in 2021 after an internal investigation revealed he neglected reports of sexual assault committed by a member of the Blackhawks' coaching staff. Bowman also resigned from the Olympic men's team and did not work in hockey until his 2024 hiring by the Oilers.

Bowman earned an Olympic gold medal in 2026 with his role as part of the managerial staff of the U.S. Olympic men's hockey team.

== Early life ==
Bowman was born in Montreal, Quebec. He moved to Buffalo, New York during his father's tenure with the Buffalo Sabres and attended Canisius High School. Bowman graduated from the University of Notre Dame in 1995 with degrees in Finance and Computer Applications. He lived in Keenan Hall. Bowman spent the next four-to-five years working in the accounting and finance field in the Chicago-area after graduating from Notre Dame.

== Executive career ==
=== Chicago Blackhawks (2000–2021) ===
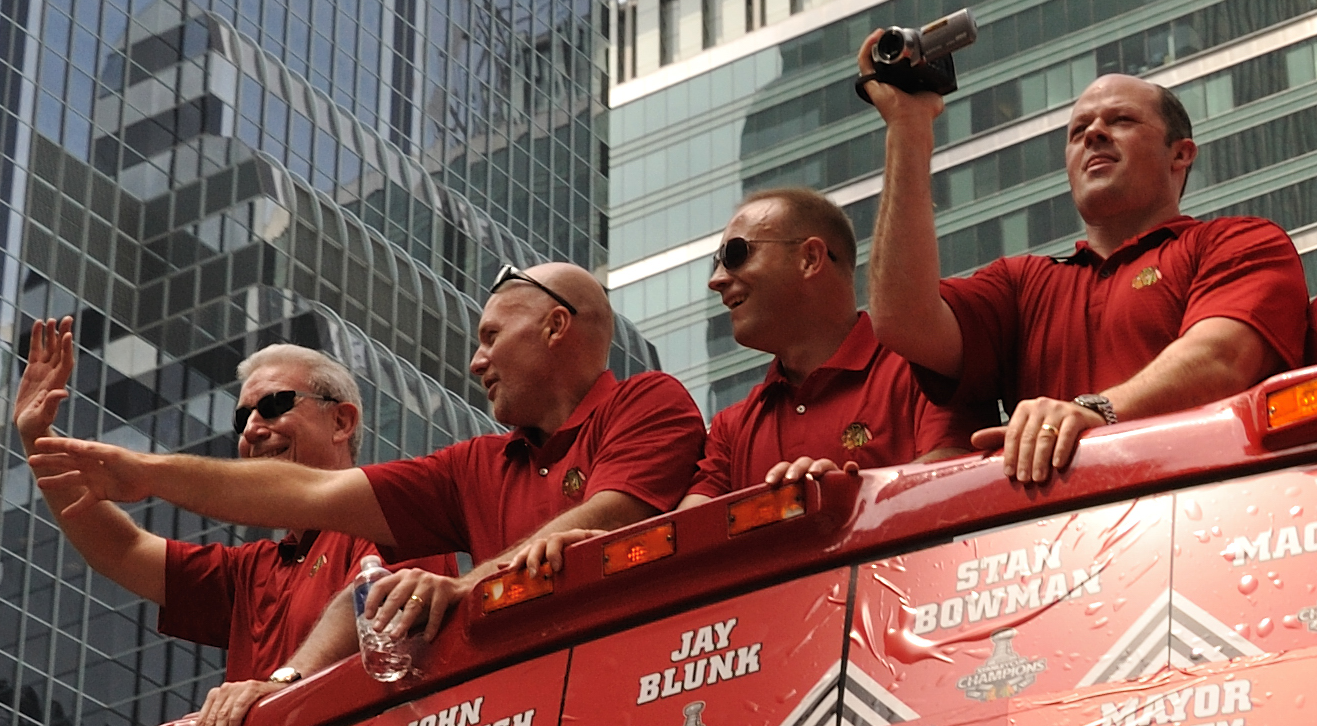
Stan Bowman (third from the left) alongside fellow Blackhawks executives John McDonough, Jay Blunk, and Al MacIsaac in June 2010.

Bowman joined the Chicago Blackhawks in 2000 as a special assistant to the general manager. His early responsibilities included working on financial budgets and evaluating prospects and players within the Blackhawks' organization. He was promoted to the director of hockey operations in 2003, which he held onto for two years before receiving another promotion to assistant general manager of hockey operations in 2007. His father, Scotty, joined the Blackhawks as a senior advisor in 2008.

On July 14, 2009, Bowman replaced Dale Tallon to become the ninth general manager in Blackhawks' history. Tallon was demoted to the position of senior advisor weeks after missing the deadline to send qualifying options to the team's restricted free agents, causing the NHL Players Association to file a grievance against the Blackhawks. Bowman inherited a core that included Jonathan Toews, Patrick Kane, Patrick Sharp, Duncan Keith, Bryan Bickell, Brent Seabrook, Dave Bolland, Niklas Hjalmarsson, and Marian Hossa, who would all play a pivotal role in the Blackhawks' future success. In his first year as general manager, the Blackhawks posted a 52–22–8 record, placing second in the West, first in the Central Division and third in the NHL overall and ultimately went on to win the 2010 Stanley Cup.

In the ensuing 2010 off-season, Bowman traded away or parted ways with almost half of the players from 2010 Stanley Cup team mainly due to salary cap issues, including Dustin Byfuglien, Andrew Ladd, Antti Niemi, Adam Burish and Kris Versteeg and brought in players such as Michael Frolik and Viktor Stålberg in trades while goaltender Corey Crawford was brought up from the minors to become the new starting goaltender and signing longtime Dallas Stars goaltender Marty Turco in free agency as a backup to Crawford. Bowman also signed rookies Nick Leddy and Marcus Krüger to their entry-level contracts prior to the 2010–11 NHL season. In 2010–11, the defending Stanley Cup champion Blackhawks narrowly qualified for the 2011 playoffs as the eighth and final seed in the Western Conference, clinching the last playoff spot on the last day of the season (despite the Blackhawks losing their season finale against the Detroit Red Wings 4–3) after the Dallas Stars lost their finale against the Minnesota Wild 5–3 later the same day. In the first round of the 2011 playoffs against the Presidents' Trophy-winning Vancouver Canucks, the Blackhawks found themselves in a 3–0 series deficit, however, they recovered by winning the next three games to force game 7 where they lost in overtime 2–1 for a 4–3 series defeat.

In the 2011 off-season, the roster continued to be retooled as veteran defenseman Brian Campbell and veteran forward Tomáš Kopecký to the Florida Panthers and Troy Brouwer to the Washington Capitals while forward Jake Dowell and goaltender Marty Turco left the team in free agency. Bowman added prospect forward Andrew Shaw while also making a trade to acquire Johnny Oduya and signed veteran goaltender Ray Emery, along with veteran forwards Daniel Carcillo and Jamal Mayers in free agency to fill the voids. On October 4, 2011, Bowman signed a contract extension to remain with the Blackhawks through the 2015–16 season. The Blackhawks finished the 2011–12 NHL season as the sixth seed in the West and losing in the first round of the playoffs for a second consecutive season having lost to the Phoenix Coyotes in six games in the opening round of the 2012 playoffs.

In the 2012 off-season, Bowman continued to retool the roster by calling up prospect forwards Brandon Bollig and Brandon Saad, signing veteran defenseman Michal Roszival and Sheldon Brookbank and trading for veteran forward Michal Handzus. The Blackhawks posted an NHL-best record of 36–7–5 during the lockout-shortened 2012–13 NHL season, and won the Presidents' Trophy and eventually the Stanley Cup.

The Blackhawks' roster from the previous two seasons before remained largely intact heading into the 2013–14 NHL season with the exemption of the retirement of Jamal Mayers and trades or free agency departures of Viktor Stålberg, Dave Bolland, Michael Frolik and Ray Emery and the return of Kris Versteeg after three seasons and signing of rookie goaltender Antti Raanta. After finishing the season as the fifth seed in the Western Conference, the Blackhawks reached the Western Conference Finals for the second consecutive year in the 2014 playoffs but lost to the eventual Stanley Cup champions, the Los Angeles Kings, in seven games.

The Blackhawks were poised for another deep playoff run during the 2014–15 season, as the majority of the roster from the previous three seasons prior remained (with the exemption of Sheldon Brookank’s retirement, Michal Handzus walking in free agency and the trades of Nick Leddy to the New York Islanders and Brandon Bollig to the Calgary Flames) and as Bowman acquired veterans Brad Richards, Andrew Desjardins, Antoine Vermette and Kimmo Timonen in trades or free agent signings and brought up prospects Teuvo Teravainen and Scott Darling from the minors. The team won the 2015 Stanley Cup, marking Bowman's third championship in six seasons.

In the years surrounding their 2015 Stanley Cup victory, the Blackhawks committed to the majority of their core players by awarding long-term contracts with full no-move clauses to Kane, Toews, Sharp, and Seabrook. These extensions, while solidifying the team's foundation, necessitated a significant roster overhaul to maintain salary cap compliance. Bowman was forced to trade away key assets, including Brandan Saad, Antti Raanta, Patrick Sharp along with Kris Versteeg (for a second time) while Johnny Oduya, Brad Richards and Antoine Vermette left the team in free agency and Daniel Carcillo and Kimmo Timonen retired. The Blackhawks posted another dominant season with another winning record of 47–26–9 record in 2015–16 despite the drastic roster turnaround thanks in part to the arrival of Artem Anisimov and Artemi Panarin as the latter would go on to win the rookie of the year award that season, and Patrick Kane having an MVP-award-winning season. Bowman, believing the Blackhawks could potentially return to the Stanley Cup Final, traded Phillip Danault to acquire veterans Tomas Fleischmann and Dale Weise at the trade deadline from the Montreal Canadiens while also re-acquiring Andrew Ladd from the Winnipeg Jets. The Blackhawks instead fell to St. Louis Blues in the first round of the 2016 playoffs in seven games.

In the 2016 off-season, Andrew Ladd signed with the New York Islanders in free agency while Bowman traded Teuvo Teravainen with Bryan Bickell to the Carolina Hurricanes to offload the final year of the latter's contract and traded Andrew Shaw to the Montreal Canadiens. Bowman also brought back veteran defenseman Brian Campbell and Johnny Oduya in free agency. During the 2016–17 season, the team then posted a conference-best 50–23–9 record but were swept by the eighth-seeded Nashville Predators in the first round of the playoffs.

Following the Blackhawks' swift playoff exit in 2017, Bowman declared the team's performance unacceptable and promised to make major changes. In an effort to extend the team's Stanley Cup window, he arranged a pair of significant draft-day trades. Panarin was dealt to Columbus to reacquire Brandon Saad, while the veteran defenseman Hjalmarsson was sent to Arizona in exchange for the slightly younger defenceman Connor Murphy. These moves were intended to create salary cap flexibility while maintaining competitive strength to remain a playoff contender. However, the Blackhawks failed to qualify for the playoffs for the first time since 2008 as they missed the playoffs by 19 points.

Bowman fired Quenneville after a poor start to the 2018–19 season having started the season with a 6–6–3 record in the first 15 games and replaced him with Jeremy Colliton.

In the 2019 off-season, Bowman traded Artem Anisimov to the Ottawa Senators followed by letting longtime centre Marcus Krüger depart in free agency. He re-acquired Andrew Shaw from the Montreal Canadiens, three years after initially trading him to the club. The Blackhawks snapped a two-year playoff drought by clinching a postseason berth in the pandemic-shortened 2019–20 season, mainly due to the playoff format being expanded from 16 teams to 24 teams. However, they were eliminated in the first round by the Vegas Golden Knights.

The slump continued over the next two years as the Blackhawks experienced additional roster turnaround, losing veterans Seabrook to retirement due to hip and shoulder injuries, Brandon Saad in a trade to the Colorado Avalanche, and opting to let longtime starting goaltender Corey Crawford in free agency. On December 16, 2020, the Blackhawks promoted Bowman to president of hockey operations. The move came after the Blackhawks fired John McDonough in April, and delegated his responsibilities between Bowman and Jaime Faulkner, who was hired as the president of business operations. On March 31, 2021, Bowman was appointed the general manager of the U.S. Olympic men's hockey team for the 2022 Beijing Games.

By the end of the pandemic-shortened 2020–21 season, Kane and Toews were the last remnants of the core group of players that won three Stanley Cups for the Blackhawks after Keith was traded to the Oilers in the 2021 off-season. Two-time Stanley Cup champion Andrew Shaw, who returned to the Blackhawks in 2019, was also forced into retirement due to repeated concussions. Bowman hoped injecting the roster with young talent, including Kirby Dach, Brandon Hagel, and Philipp Kurashev would allow the team to return to the playoffs. He also made a blockbuster trade before the 2021–22 season to acquire defensemen Seth Jones, whom he then signed to an eight-year extension worth $9.5 million with a no-movement clause. However, Bowman resigned from his position only a few weeks into the season. The Blackhawks struggled throughout the season, and his successor, Kyle Davidson, initiated a full-scale rebuild by offloading DeBrincat, Dach, and Hagel for prospects and draft capital. Kane was also dealt for picks, while Toews was not re-signed after his contract expired in 2023.

=== Sexual abuse scandal and hiatus (2021–2024) ===
In May 2021, the Chicago Blackhawks hired Jenner & Block to launch an internal investigation following accusations of sexual assault and negligence that occurred during the 2010 Stanley Cup playoffs. Then-prospect Kyle Beach claimed the team’s video coach, Brad Aldrich, sexually assaulted him and his reports were not properly handled by the team's coaches and executives, including Bowman, assistant general manager Al MacIsaac, president John McDonough, and head coach Joel Quenneville. The official report was released on October 26, and concluded that Bowman, Quenneville, MacIsaac, and McDonough were aware of accusations of sexual assault, but failed to report to the incidents to either the police or the Blackhawks' human resources department. Bowman immediately resigned from his position after the report was released and expressed regret for mishandling Beach's accusations against Aldrich. He also resigned as the general manager of the U.S. Olympic men's hockey team the same day. Although Bowman was not officially suspended when he resigned, NHL commissioner Gary Bettman did not reinstate him, noting that anyone involved in the incident must meet with him before seeking future league employment.

=== Edmonton Oilers (2024–present) ===
On July 1, 2024, the NHL reinstated Bowman, MacIsaac and Quenneville and allowed them to sign contracts with other teams. The Edmonton Oilers hired Bowman as their general manager and executive vice president of hockey operations on July 24, succeeding Ken Holland. Bowman and the Oilers faced severe salary cap constraints from the beginning of his tenure. He was forced to allow prospects Philip Broberg and Dylan Holloway to leave Edmonton as restricted free agents in exchange for second and third-round picks. He traded a first-round pick to acquire defenseman Jake Walman, whom he subsequently signed to a seven-year $49-million deal that would last until he was 37. He also extended Trent Frederic to an eight-year $30.8 million contract with a no-movement clause that would expire when Frederic was 35.

In March 2025, Bowman filed a motion to quash a subpoena for his deposition in a second sexual assault lawsuit related to his time at the Blackhawks, arguing that he was not properly served the subpoena and lack of jurisdiction because of his Canadian citizenship and current residence in Edmonton.

Bowman made only two acquisitions during the 2025–26 NHL season's free agency period in July, signing depth forwards Andrew Mangiapane, which included a full no-trade clause, and Curtis Lazar. Bowman acquired goalie Tristan Jarry and forward Samuel Poulin from the Pittsburgh Penguins in exchange for Stuart Skinner, Brett Kulak, and a second round pick in December. During the ensuing trade deadline, Bowman made two separate trades with the Blackhawks to acquire Connor Murphy, Jason Dickinson, and Colton Dach for Mangiapane along with first and second-round draft picks. Edmonton finished the season with a 41–30–11 record marking their lowest regular-season points percentage (.567) since the 2018–19 season. The team lost to the Anaheim Ducks in the opening round of the 2026 Stanley Cup playoffs.

Bowman fired Kris Knoblauch following the Oilers' early playoff exit. He hired veteran head coach Mike Babcock to replace Knoblauch. Bowman's choice to hire Babcock was met with scrutiny and an NHL investigation that focused on Babcock's mentally abusive coaching techniques. The NHL ultimately cleared Babcock.

== Personal life ==
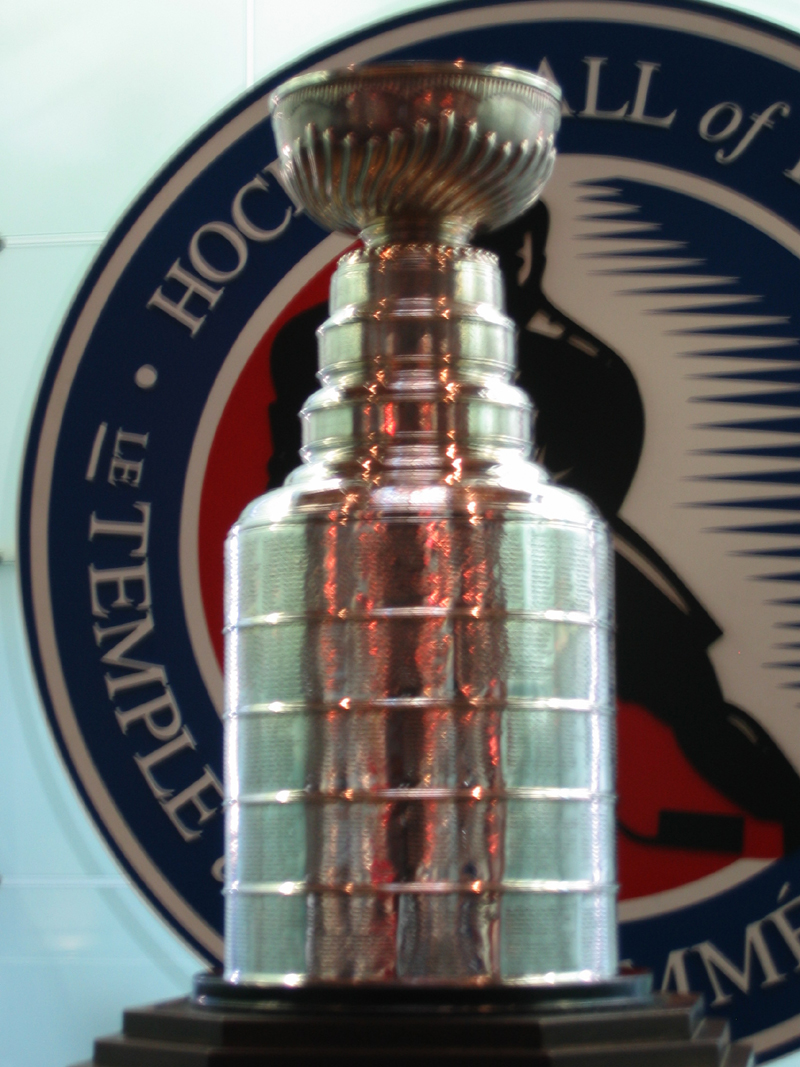
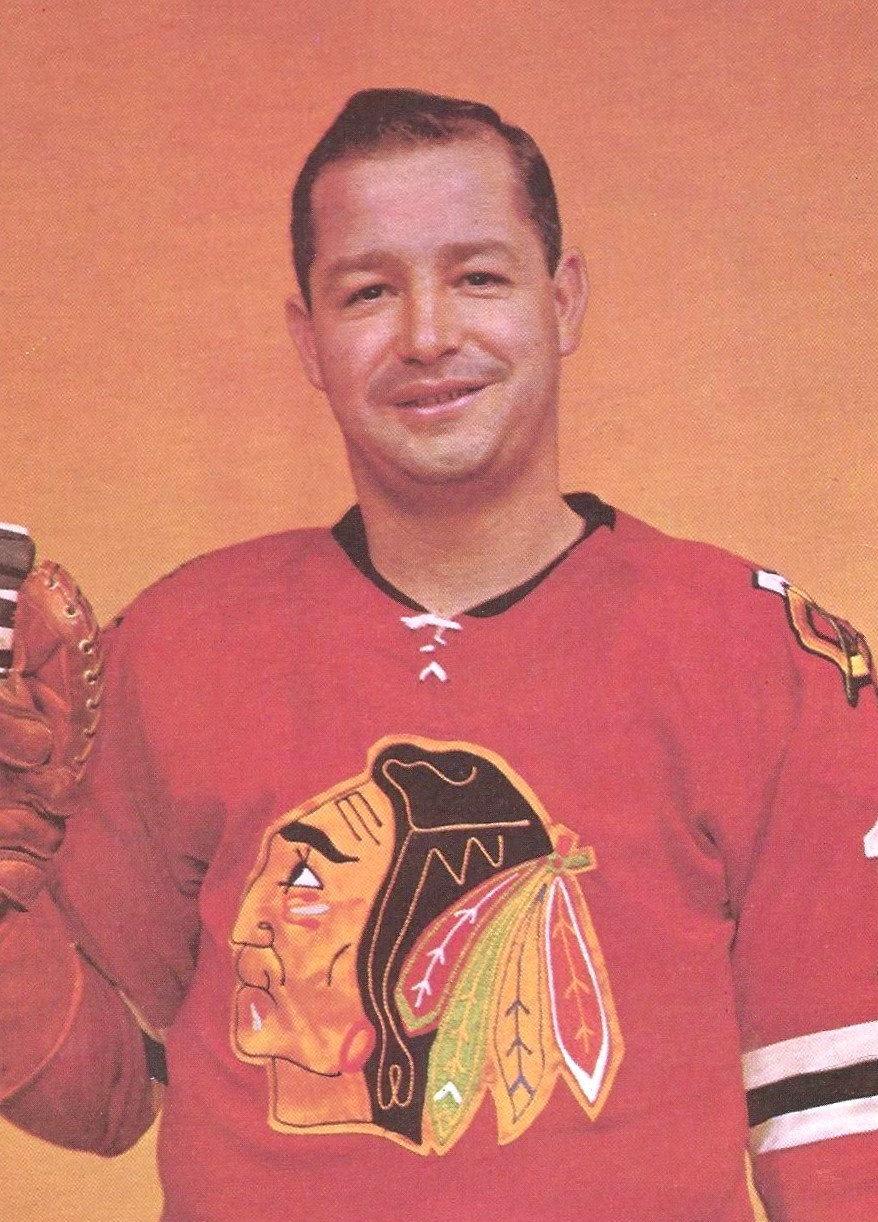
Bowman was named after the Stanley Cup and goalie Glenn Hall.

Bowman and his wife Suzanne have three children.

He is named after the Stanley Cup; his father won his first Stanley Cup, as coach of the Montreal Canadiens, just one month before Stan's birth. His middle name, Glenn, is a reference to NHL Hall of Fame goalie Glenn Hall, whom his father coached on the St. Louis Blues in 1968.

In 2007, Bowman was diagnosed with Hodgkin's lymphoma, cancer of the lymph nodes. The cancer went into remission after chemotherapy, but reappeared in early 2008, necessitating a stem cell transplant, radiation and more chemotherapy. As of 2013, the cancer was in remission.

Sporting positions
| Preceded by Dale Tallon | General manager of the Chicago Blackhawks; 2009–2021 | Succeeded by Kyle Davidson |
| Preceded by Jeff Jackson (interim) | General manager of the Edmonton Oilers; 2024–present | Incumbent |
