= List of Edmonton Oilers general managers =

General managers of the professional ice hockey team the Edmonton Oilers

The Edmonton Oilers are a professional ice hockey franchise based in Edmonton, Alberta. They play in the Pacific Division of the Western Conference in the National Hockey League (NHL). They were founded in 1972 as a member of the World Hockey Association (WHA) and played in the WHA until 1979 when they joined the NHL. The team has had eleven general managers since their inception.

== Key ==
Key of terms and definitions
Term	Definition
No.	Number of general managers^{[a]}
Ref(s)	References
–	Does not apply
†	Elected to the Hockey Hall of Fame in the Builder category

== General managers ==
General managers of the Edmonton Oilers
No.	Name	Tenure	Accomplishments during this term	Ref(s)
1	Bill Hunter	November 1, 1971 – June 15, 1976	2 playoff appearances	
2	Bep Guidolin	June 15, 1976 – August 25, 1977	1 playoff appearance	
3	Brian Conacher	August 25, 1977 – April 26, 1978	1 playoff appearance	
4	Larry Gordon	April 26, 1978 – May 15, 1980	1 Avco Cup finals appearance (1979); 2 playoff appearances	
5	Glen Sather†	May 15, 1980 – June 9, 2000	Won Stanley Cup five times in six finals appearances (1983, 1984, 1985, 1987, 1988, 1990); Won Presidents' Trophy two times (1985–86, 1986–87); 6 conference titles, 6 division titles, and 16 playoff appearances	
6	Kevin Lowe	June 9, 2000 – July 31, 2008	1 Stanley Cup Final appearance (2006); 1 conference title and 3 playoff appearances	
7	Steve Tambellini	July 31, 2008 – April 15, 2013	No playoff appearances	
8	Craig MacTavish	April 15, 2013 – April 24, 2015	No playoff appearances	
9	Peter Chiarelli	April 24, 2015 – January 22, 2019	1 playoff appearance	
-	Keith Gretzky (interim)	January 23, 2019 – May 7, 2019	No playoff appearances	
10	Ken Holland†	May 7, 2019 – June 27, 2024	1 Stanley Cup Final appearance (2024); 1 conference title and 5 playoff appearances	
-	Jeff Jackson (interim)	June 27, 2024 – July 24, 2024		
11	Stan Bowman	July 24, 2024 – present	1 Stanley Cup Final appearance (2025); 1 conference title and 2 playoff appearances	

== See also ==
- List of NHL general managers

== Notes ==
- ^{a} A running total of the number of general managers of the franchise. Thus any general manager who has two or more separate terms as general manager is only counted once.
