= Keith Gretzky =

Canadian ice hockey player and executive (born 1967)

- Born: February 16, 1967 (age 59) Brantford, Ontario, Canada
- Height: 5 ft 9 in (175 cm)
- Weight: 157 lb (71 kg; 11 st 3 lb)
- Position: Centre
- Shot: Left
- Played for: Flint Spirits; Rochester Americans; Phoenix Roadrunners; Ayr Raiders; San Diego Gulls
- NHL draft: 56th overall, 1985; Buffalo Sabres
- Playing career: 1987–1993

Keith Edward Gretzky (born February 16, 1967) is a Canadian ice hockey executive and former player who served as interim general manager of the Edmonton Oilers from January 23 to May 7, 2019. He is the brother of Wayne Gretzky, considered by many as the best player of all time, and Brent Gretzky, who also briefly played NHL hockey.

== Playing and coaching career ==
Keith, Wayne and Brent Gretzky were taught hockey by their father, Walter. He had a moderately successful career in the OHL with the Brantford Alexanders, Windsor Spitfires, Belleville Bulls, and Hamilton Steelhawks, His best season as a player came in 1986–87 when he recorded 35 goals, 66 assists for 101 points in 64 games with Belleville and Hamilton. In 298 OHL games, he collected 113 goals, 222 assists and 335 points.

Keith was taken in the 3rd round (56th overall) of the 1985 NHL entry draft by the Buffalo Sabres. Though he attended two training camps and played in several pre-season games, he never played a regular season game for the Sabres. Gretzky played five seasons in the International Hockey League with the Flint Spirits, San Diego Gulls and the Phoenix Roadrunners (28 goals, 51 assists, and 79 points in 132 games) and two seasons in the American Hockey League with the Rochester Americans (11 goals, 37 assists, 48 points in 66 games). Gretzky also played one season in the East Coast Hockey League with the Winston-Salem Thunderbirds. He then played two seasons in Europe with Ketterä in Finland's I-Divisioona, and the Ayr Raiders in the British Hockey League.

After retiring from professional hockey in 1993, Gretzky turned to coaching and began his career behind the bench with the Tri-City Americans (WHL) as an assistant coach. After one season with Tri-City, he moved to Bakersfield where he became the head coach of the WCHL's Fog. Gretzky coached three seasons with the Fog (1995–1998) before leaving to coach the Asheville Smoke of the UHL for two seasons (1998–2000). He coached his brother Brent with the Smoke. He was also general manager of the Smoke.

Gretzky joined the Phoenix Coyotes as a scout in 2001, then was promoted to Director of Amateur Scouting for the Coyotes on July 12, 2006, after serving the previous five seasons as an amateur scout for both the Quebec Major Junior Hockey League and Ontario Hockey League. In 2013, he joined the Boston Bruins organization as an amateur scout, and in August 2013 was appointed the Director of Amateur Scouting for the Bruins.

On August 2, 2016, Gretzky was hired by the Edmonton Oilers as assistant general manager. On January 23, 2019, Gretzky was made interim General Manager (GM) of the Edmonton Oilers, subsequent to the firing of former general manager Peter Chiarelli from the position. The team went 12-14-6 during his interim stint. He served in the position until May 7, 2019, when Ken Holland was appointed GM, and returned to the position of assistant general manager afterwards.

Gretzky appeared in two 1981 7 Up commercials with his brother Wayne. Keith had the punchline in one ad: "I taught him everything he knows".

== See also ==
- Notable families in the NHL

Preceded by Peter Chiarelli	Interim General Manager of the Edmonton Oilers; 2019	Succeeded by Ken Holland
