= Jeff Gorton =

American ice hockey executive

- Born: June 6, 1968 (age 58); Melrose, Massachusetts, U.S.
- Occupation: Executive vice president of hockey operations of the Montreal Canadiens

Jeff Gorton (born June 6, 1968) is an American ice hockey executive who is the president of hockey operations for the Montreal Canadiens of the National Hockey League (NHL). He previously served six seasons as general manager of the New York Rangers between 2015 and 2021. Gorton was also the interim general manager of the Boston Bruins during the 2005–06 season, replacing Mike O'Connell, who was fired on March 25, 2006.

== Professional ==
Gorton began working for the Boston Bruins in 1992. He worked as assistant general manager for seven seasons and served as the team's interim general manager from March 25, 2006, until July 15, 2006.

In his time as interim general manager of the Bruins, Gorton most notably ran the 2006 NHL entry draft which produced for the Bruins Phil Kessel, Milan Lucic and Brad Marchand. At the same draft, Gorton traded goaltender Andrew Raycroft to the Toronto Maple Leafs for goaltender prospect Tuukka Rask. Raycroft was coming off a subpar season and his two-year stint in Toronto would prove disastrous, with the Leafs buying him out of the final year of his contract. Rask, meanwhile, had been selected in the first round of the 2005 NHL entry draft by Toronto and went on to win the Vezina Trophy as the league's best goaltender in the 2013–14 season. Rask also backstopped the Bruins to two Stanley Cup Finals appearances in 2013 and 2019. On July 1, Gorton signed Zdeno Chára and Marc Savard as free agents. Chára would go on to win the Norris Trophy in 2009 as the NHL's best defenseman while under the contract signed by Gorton.

On July 15, 2006, he returned to his assistant general manager duties when Peter Chiarelli was hired as permanent general manager. He was dismissed, along with respected scout Daniel Doré on June 27, 2007. Gorton was immediately picked up as a Pro Scout by the New York Rangers.

On July 1, 2015, Gorton replaced Glen Sather to become the eleventh general manager in New York Rangers history.

On May 5, 2021, Gorton was fired, along with president John Davidson, by the Rangers and was replaced by his associate general manager, Chris Drury. Gorton was then hired to be a TV studio analyst for the NHL Network.

On November 28, 2021, Gorton was hired by the Montreal Canadiens to fill the position of executive vice president of hockey operations after the team relieved general manager Marc Bergevin, assistant general manager Trevor Timmins, and senior vice president Paul Wilson of their duties. This followed a disastrous start to the 2021–22 NHL season, which saw the team go 6–15–2 through the first 23 games, the worst start in the franchise's 112-year history.

== Personal life ==
Gorton was born and raised in Melrose, Massachusetts. He is a graduate of Bridgewater State University with a degree in physical education in 1991, and he received his master's degree from Springfield College in sport management in 1993.

Gorton resides in Montreal, Quebec and Windham, New Hampshire, with his wife, Cyndi and their two sons. The family previously resided in Reading, Massachusetts during his tenure with the Bruins and Somers, New York during his tenure with the Rangers.

Preceded by Mike O'Connell	General manager of the Boston Bruins; 2006	Succeeded by Peter Chiarelli
Preceded by Glen Sather	General manager of the New York Rangers; 2015–2021	Succeeded by Chris Drury
