= Kyle Davidson =

Canadian sports manager (born c.1988)

- Born: July 1, 1988 (age 38); Ottawa, Ontario, Canada
- Education: Laurentian University (Bachelor's degree)
- Occupation: Ice hockey executive
- Known for: General Manager (Chicago Blackhawks)

Kyle Davidson (born July 1, 1988) is a Canadian sports executive who currently serves as the general manager of the Chicago Blackhawks of the National Hockey League (NHL) since October 26, 2021. He initially joined the Blackhawks in 2010 as an intern and worked his way through the organization in different roles before finally becoming the team's general manager in 2021.

== Early life ==
Davidson was raised in Sudbury, Ontario. He was born with Tetralogy of Fallot, a heart defect that required him to undergo two open-heart surgeries as an infant. He expressed an early interest in hockey. He served as an assistant equipment manager with the Sudbury Junior Wolves of the Northern Ontario Junior Hockey League in 2006. Davidson graduated with a bachelor's degree in Sports Administration from Laurentian University in 2010.

== Professional career ==
=== Early positions ===
Davidson interned for the Ottawa Senators in their supporter relations department in 2009, while also volunteering for the Sudbury Wolves as a scout. He also worked as an intern for the Rockford IceHogs, the American Hockey League (AHL) affiliate of the Chicago Blackhawks in sales. Davidson's role with the IceHogs landed him an internship with the Blackhawks as a video analyst in 2010. Between 2012 and 2018, he worked for the ice hockey organization's administration and held various positions, participating in two Stanley Cup wins in the 2012–13 and 2014–15 seasons. In 2018, he was appointed assistant to general manager Stan Bowman. His responsibilities as an assistant general manager included scouting, salary-cap management, contract negotiations, and analytics. Davidson would later reflect on his many roles and responsibilities stating, "I really wanted to be versatile. I didn't want to be able to be called for just one aspect. From an early standpoint, I just wanted to be useful. But moving forward and as I grew into my role and grew in the department, I wanted to be able to offer opinions in those different areas. Whether it be speaking on players in meetings, suggestions on roster construction, I wanted to be able to be a legitimate contributor."

=== Executive role ===
In 2021, Davidson was promoted to assistant general manager, and he took over on an interim basis after Stan Bowman stepped down from his positions with the Blackhawks in October. In one of his first moves as general manager, Davidson fired Blackhawks head coach Jeremy Colliton following a dismal 1–9–2 start. The Blackhawks removed the interim tag, and formally named him as their general manager on March 1, 2022. At 33, he became the youngest active general manager in the NHL at the time. The team placed seventh in Central Division with a 28–42–12 record to conclude the 2021–22 season, and missed the playoffs for the fourth time in five years.

Davidson initiated a full rebuild of the roster due to limited talent in Blackhawks' development pipeline prior to the 2022–23 season. He traded away or declined to retain much of the franchise's existing young talent. Davidson dealt Alex DeBrincat to the Ottawa Senators and Kirby Dach to the Montreal Canadiens in deals based primarily on the acquisition of first-round picks in the 2022 NHL entry draft, and acquired a third first-rounder in agreeing to take goaltender Petr Mrázek from the Toronto Maple Leafs, using those picks in turn to draft Kevin Korchinski, Frank Nazar, and Sam Rinzel. He had also traded Brandon Hagel to the Tampa Bay Lightning in exchange for two first-round picks in subsequent draft years. After the draft, he allowed Dylan Strome and Dominik Kubalík to hit unrestricted free agency. The cumulative effect of these transactions meant that the Blackhawks lost five of their seven highest-scoring forwards from the prior season. Davidson hired Luke Richardson as the team's head coach to replace Colliton. The Blackhawks finished third-last in the league in the 2022–23 season, in the process trading away Patrick Kane and opting not to re-sign Jonathan Toews, the two remaining stars of the previous era. A critic dubbed Davidson's moves as a "blatant tank-job" that was aimed to improve their lottery odds for the 2023 NHL entry draft and possibly draft generational prospect Connor Bedard. Davidson's plans were rewarded when the team won the draft lottery at season's ending, securing the right to draft Bedard.

During the offseason of the 2023–24 NHL season, Davidson sought to surround Bedard with veteran talent. He acquired forwards Taylor Hall, Nick Foligno and Corey Perry via trades, while also signing Ryan Donato in free agency. However, the team faced several injuries and finished the season with the second-worst record in the league. Davidson drafted defenseman Artyom Levshunov second overall in the 2024 NHL entry draft.

Davidson opened free agency with a flurry of signings, landing veterans Tyler Bertuzzi, Teuvo Teravainen, Craig Smith, T.J. Brodie, Alec Martinez, and Laurent Brossoit. The Blackhawks suffered a poor start to the season, resulting in Davidson firing Luke Richardson after 26 games. He traded to Taylor Hall and Seth Jones for draft picks and prospects as the team fell out of playoff contention. The Blackhawks finished their 2024–25 campaign second to last again. Despite Davidson's fourth losing season in as many years, Blackhawks owner Danny Wirtz expressed support for him.

Davidson prioritized forward depth during the opening round of the 2025 NHL entry draft, using the team's three first-round picks to acquire Anton Frondell (3rd overall), Vaclav Nestrasil (25th overall), and Mason West (29th overall). The three were among 11 players Davidson drafted in the first round alone over the past four years. He had a reserved approach to the 2025 free agency market, signing only Dominic Toninato to a two-year, two-way contract. He hired Jeff Blashill as the team's new head coach, marking the first coach the Blackhawks had hired with prior head coaching experience since 2018. Davidson and the Blackhawks emerged as sellers at the trade deadline as the team fell out of playoff contention. He offloaded veterans Connor Murphy, Jason Dickinson, and Nick Foligno, along with prospect Colton Dach for draft capital and Andrew Mangiapane. The Blackhawks finished the 2024-2025 season 31st out of 32 teams in the NHL. Wirtz again supported Davidson, extending the general manager to a multi-year contract extension in April 2026.

== Personal life ==
Davidson and his wife, Angelica, have two daughters. Davidson's uncle, Peter Richards, played professional hockey for eight seasons across various minor league teams, including the Hamilton Steelhawks, Sudbury Wolves, Knoxville Cherokees, and Brantford Smoke.

Davidson was randomly selected to appear in an interview for Penalty Box Radio before the 2023 NHL Draft in Nashville, Tennessee, where he was believed to be an ordinary fan. Davidson downplayed his role as an NHL general manager and simply identified himself as "Kyle from Chicago", causing the video to go viral.
