= Don Sweeney =

Canadian ice hockey player

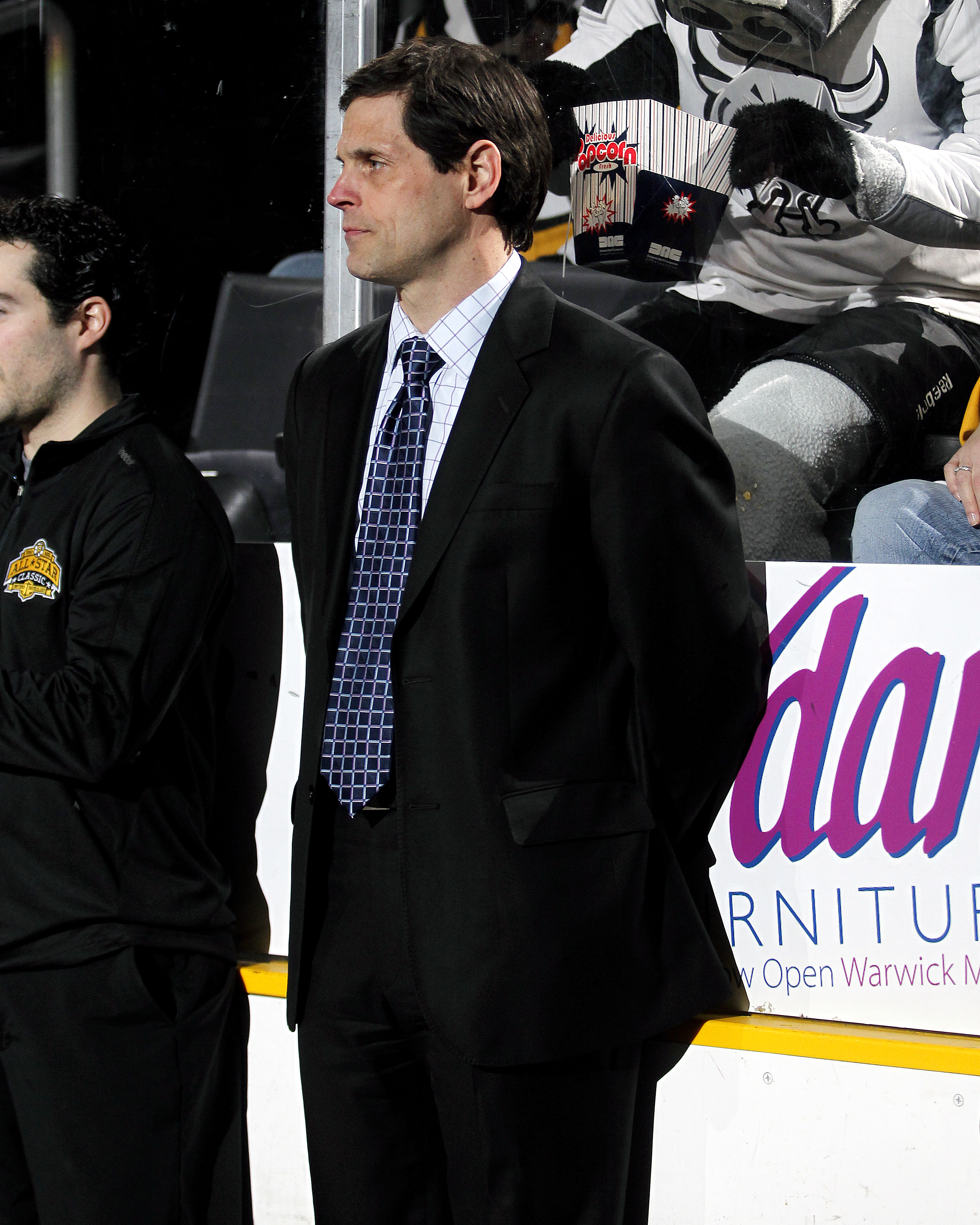
- Sweeney in 2013
- Born: August 17, 1966 (age 60) St. Stephen, New Brunswick, Canada
- Height: 5 ft 10 in (178 cm)
- Weight: 184 lb (83 kg; 13 st 2 lb)
- Position: Defence
- Shot: Left
- Played for: Boston Bruins; Dallas Stars
- National team: Canada
- NHL draft: 166th overall, 1984; Boston Bruins
- Playing career: 1988–2004

Donald Clarke Sweeney (born August 17, 1966) is a Canadian former ice hockey defenceman who played over 1,100 games in the National Hockey League (NHL), mostly with the Boston Bruins. He ranks among the top ten in many Bruins team statistics, including fourth overall in total games played. After retiring from hockey following the 2003–04 season, he worked briefly as a broadcaster before rejoining the Bruins as a team executive in 2006. His name is engraved on the Stanley Cup from the Bruins' 2011 championship, when he was Assistant General Manager.

He is the current general manager of the Bruins, a position he has held since May 2015 after replacing Peter Chiarelli.

== Early life ==
Sweeney grew up in St. Stephen, New Brunswick. In high school, he skated for St. Paul's School in Concord, New Hampshire. He was drafted to the NHL by the Bruins out of high school, 166th overall in the eighth round, but he postponed his NHL career to attend college. He decided to attend Harvard University, where he lived in Grays Hall during his freshman year. He played hockey for four years there for the Crimson ice hockey team, where he was named an NCAA East All-American and an ECAC First Team All-Star in 1988.

== Playing career ==
Sweeney made his NHL debut during the 1988–89 season, having spent half of the year with the American Hockey League (AHL)'s Maine Mariners. In the following season, he helped the Bruins win the Prince of Wales Trophy by scoring six points in 21 games until they eventually lost to the Edmonton Oilers in the Stanley Cup Final.

In 1992–93, Sweeney played in all 84 games, putting up 36 points. In both the 1994–95 and 1995–96 seasons, he was second amongst Boston defencemen with 22 and 28 points, respectively. In 1997–98, Sweeney missed the last 23 games of the season with a fractured shoulder that he suffered on March 1. In the next season, Sweeney achieved 205 hits and 85 blocked shots in 81 games. In the 1999–2000 season, he had 301 hits and 84 blocked shots; the following year he had 172 hits in 72 games, and in the 2000–01 season, he contributed 18 points in 81 games. In the 2002–03 season, Sweeney scored only eight points in 67 games as his team nestled into third place in the division. On November 14 that year, he also played in his 1,000th NHL game.

Sweeney played 15 seasons and 1,051 games for Boston, being one of just four players—and two defensemen—in team history to play in over 1,000 games.

Since July 2006, he has ranked third on the Bruins' all-time games played, while amongst all-time club defencemen, he ranks tenth in career goals (52), eighth in assists (210), and ninth in points (262).

Sweeney ended his playing career in 2003–04 as a member of the Dallas Stars. He retired with NHL totals of 52 goals and 221 assists for 273 points and 681 penalty minutes in 1,115 career regular-season games. He added nine goals and ten assists for 19 points with 81 penalty minutes in 108 career playoff games.

== Executive career ==
Following the firing of Peter Chiarelli as Bruins' general manager on April 15, 2015, speculation had surrounded Sweeney's status within the Bruins front office, as Sweeney's early May 2015 meeting with Bruins head coach Claude Julien may have been an indication that as well as Julien remaining as the Bruins' head coach into the 2015–16 season, Sweeney could have been in line to become the Bruins' next general manager. On May 20, the Bruins named Sweeney as the team's general manager.

On June 26, at the 2015 NHL entry draft and in his first major move as GM, Sweeney traded restricted free agent defenceman Dougie Hamilton to the Calgary Flames in exchange for the Draft's 15th overall pick (used to select Zachary Senyshyn) and two second-round draft picks. Shortly after, he traded long-time Bruins forward Milan Lucic to the Los Angeles Kings in exchange for the 13th overall pick (used to select Jakub Zbořil), Martin Jones and Colin Miller. Four days later, on June 30, Sweeney then traded Jones to the San Jose Sharks for a first-round pick in 2016 (29th overall, used to select Trent Frederic)

With Sweeney as the General Manager, the Bruins returned to prominence in the 2018–19 season, winning the Eastern Conference Finals and securing a berth at the 2019 Stanley Cup Final against the St. Louis Blues. Despite losing to the Blues, Sweeney was recognized as the NHL General Manager of the Year Award at the NHL Awards Ceremony in Las Vegas, Nevada, on Jun 19, 2019.

Sweeney was named the general manager of Team Canada ahead of the inaugural 4 Nations Face-Off. Team Canada would ultimately win the tournament.

== Personal life ==
Sweeney and his wife, former figure skater Christine Hough, have twin sons, Jarrod and Tyler.

== Career statistics ==
=== Regular season and playoffs ===
			Regular season					Playoffs
Season	Team	League	GP	G	A	Pts	PIM	GP	G	A	Pts	PIM
1983–84	St. Paul's School	ISL	22	33	26	59	—	—	—	—	—	—
1984–85	Harvard University	ECAC	29	3	7	10	30	—	—	—	—	—
1985–86	Harvard University	ECAC	31	4	5	9	12	—	—	—	—	—
1986–87	Harvard University	ECAC	34	7	4	11	22	—	—	—	—	—
1987–88	Harvard University	ECAC	30	6	23	29	37	—	—	—	—	—
1987–88	Maine Mariners	AHL	—	—	—	—	—	6	1	3	4	0
1988–89	Boston Bruins	NHL	36	3	5	8	20	—	—	—	—	—
1988–89	Maine Mariners	AHL	42	8	17	25	24	—	—	—	—	—
1989–90	Boston Bruins	NHL	58	3	5	8	58	21	1	5	6	18
1989–90	Maine Mariners	AHL	11	0	8	8	8	—	—	—	—	—
1990–91	Boston Bruins	NHL	77	8	13	21	67	19	3	0	3	25
1991–92	Boston Bruins	NHL	75	3	11	14	74	15	0	0	0	10
1992–93	Boston Bruins	NHL	84	7	27	34	68	4	0	0	0	4
1993–94	Boston Bruins	NHL	75	6	15	21	50	12	2	1	3	4
1994–95	Boston Bruins	NHL	47	3	19	22	24	5	0	0	0	4
1995–96	Boston Bruins	NHL	77	4	24	28	42	5	0	2	2	6
1996–97	Boston Bruins	NHL	82	3	23	26	39	—	—	—	—	—
1997–98	Boston Bruins	NHL	59	1	15	16	24	—	—	—	—	—
1998–99	Boston Bruins	NHL	81	2	10	12	64	11	3	0	3	6
1999–2000	Boston Bruins	NHL	81	1	13	14	48	—	—	—	—	—
2000–01	Boston Bruins	NHL	72	2	10	12	26	—	—	—	—	—
2001–02	Boston Bruins	NHL	81	3	15	18	35	6	0	1	1	2
2002–03	Boston Bruins	NHL	67	3	5	8	24	5	0	1	1	0
2003–04	Dallas Stars	NHL	63	0	11	11	18	5	0	0	0	2
NHL totals			1,115	52	221	273	681	108	9	10	19	81

=== International ===
Year	Team	Event	Result	GP	G	A	Pts	PIM
1997	Canada	WC	1st place, gold medalist(s)	11	1	3	4	6
Senior totals				11	1	3	4	6

== Awards and honours ==
Award	Year
College
All-ECAC Hockey First Team	1987–88
AHCA East Second-Team All-American	1987–88
NHL
Stanley Cup Champion	2011 (as a executive)
General Manager of the Year Award	2018–19
International
4 Nations Face-Off champion	2025 (general manager)
Boston Bruins	
Named One of the Top 100 Best Bruins Players of all Time	2023

== See also ==
- List of NHL players with 1,000 games played

Sporting positions
Preceded by Peter Chiarelli	General manager of the Boston Bruins; 2015–present	Incumbent
