= Mike O'Connell =

American ice hockey player, coach and executive

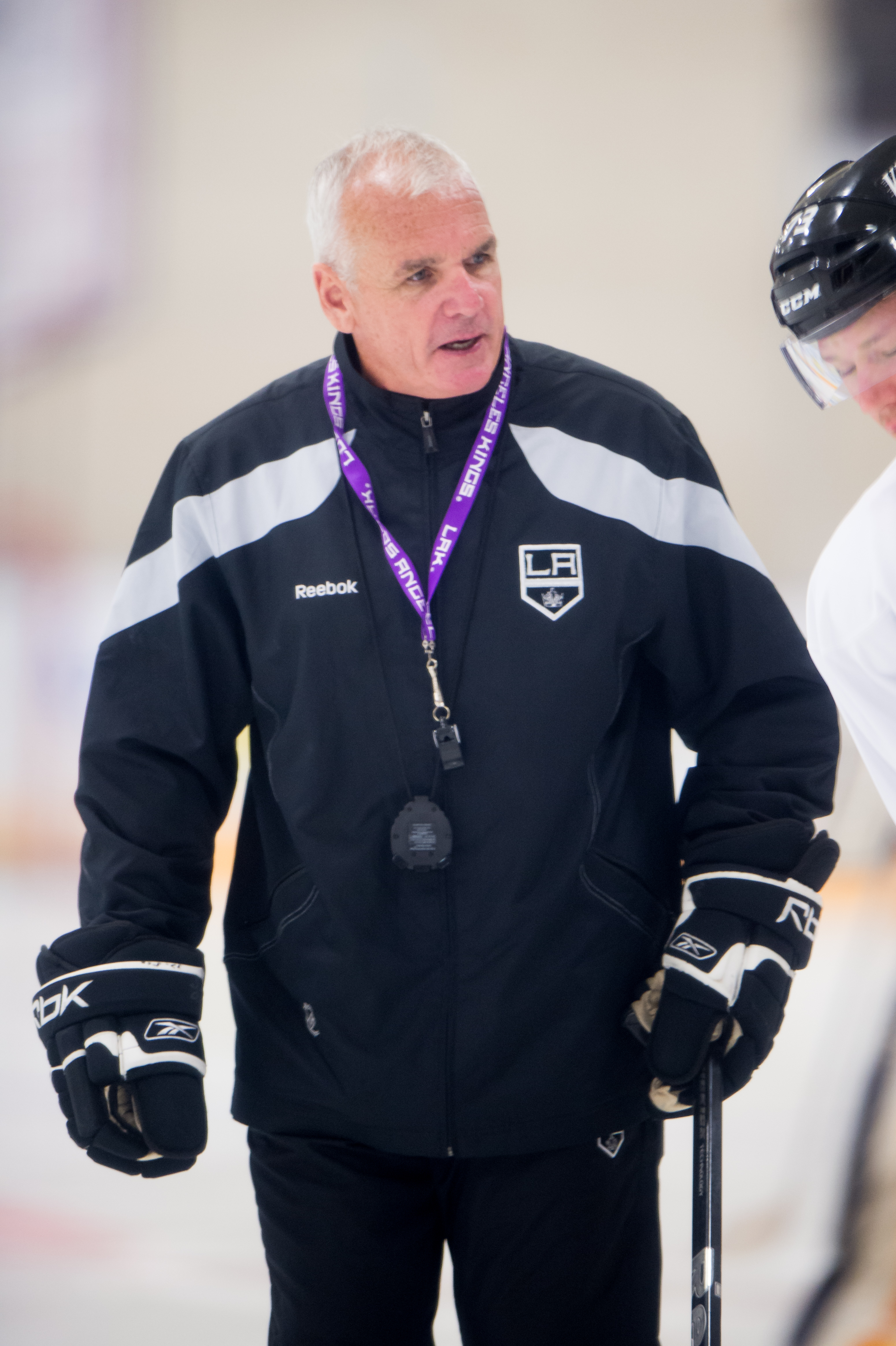
- O'Connell in 2013
- Born: November 25, 1955 (age 70) Chicago, Illinois, U.S.
- Height: 5 ft 9 in (175 cm)
- Weight: 185 lb (84 kg; 13 st 3 lb)
- Position: Defense
- Shot: Right
- Played for: Chicago Black Hawks; Boston Bruins; Detroit Red Wings
- National team: United States
- NHL draft: 43rd overall, 1975; Chicago Black Hawks
- WHA draft: 24th overall, 1975; Phoenix Roadrunners
- Playing career: 1975–1990

Michael Thomas O'Connell (born November 25, 1955) is an American former professional ice hockey player and general manager who currently serves as the director of pro development for the Los Angeles Kings. He played 860 National Hockey League (NHL) regular season games between 1977 and 1990 and later served as the general manager of the Boston Bruins from 2000 until 2006. He is the son of former National Football League (NFL) quarterback Tommy O'Connell and brother of former World Hockey Association (WHA) player Tim O'Connell.

== Playing career ==
=== Youth and junior hockey ===
O'Connell was raised in Cohasset, Massachusetts, and grew up playing hockey and gridiron football at Archbishop Williams High School in Braintree. He moved to the Ontario Major Junior Hockey League's Kingston Canadians as a teenager, following the recommendation of Boston Bruins general manager Harry Sinden and was promptly named best OMJHL defenceman in 1974–75.

=== NHL career ===
O'Connell was chosen in the second round, 43rd overall, by the Chicago Black Hawks in the 1975 NHL entry draft. His professional career for the Hawks began in the minors with the Central Professional Hockey League's Dallas Black Hawks in 1976–77. He became the first Chicago native to play for the Black Hawks in 1978, but most of his career was spent in his adopted home state of Massachusetts with the Boston Bruins, who obtained him in a trade for Al Secord in 1980. An excellent skater, O'Connell was a solid all-around player, being both reliable in the defensive zone and consistently effective on offense, with a hard, accurate shot from the point. His best years were spent in Boston, helping to make up a defensive squad that included Brad Park and Ray Bourque. He played in the 1984 NHL All-Star Game while with the Bruins, also representing the United States at the 1981 Canada Cup and 1985 Ice Hockey World Championship tournaments. O'Connell finished his NHL career as a penalty killer and defensive specialist with the Detroit Red Wings in 1989, who had obtained him in a trade for Reed Larson in 1986. He also served as an alternate captain during his time with the Red Wings.

== Management career ==
Following retirement as a player, O'Connell served as head coach of the San Diego Gulls of the International Hockey League (IHL) in 1990–91. Despite a losing record, Harry Sinden hired his protégé to coach the Bruins' top minor league affiliate, the Providence Bruins. O'Connell was then named the Bruins' assistant general manager in 1994, also becoming vice president of hockey operations in 1998 and alternate governor in 2000. The Bruins named O'Connell vice president and general manager on November 1, 2000, and he later signed a five-year contract extension on June 21, 2002. He was however fired from the job on March 25, 2006 following a controversial number of player trades that did not work out well for the Bruins. Notably, O'Connell decided to trade high-scoring center Joe Thornton.

In 2003–04 season, under his direction, the Bruins finished first in the Northeast Division, second in the Eastern Conference and fourth overall in the NHL with 104 points. The NHL then locked-out its players for the 2004–05 season and the Bruins lost five players previously acquired by O'Connell (Michael Nylander, Brian Rolston, Sean O'Donnell, Mike Knuble and Sergei Gonchar) to free agency. O'Connell blamed Bruins owner Jeremy Jacobs for the decision to not re-sign the free agents.

In 2005, O'Connell traded Bruins star center Joe Thornton to the San Jose Sharks, receiving Brad Stuart, Marco Sturm and Wayne Primeau in exchange. Thornton would ultimately win the Hart Memorial Trophy as the League's most valuable player and the Art Ross Trophy as scoring champion at the conclusion of the 2005–06 season.

Many important players on the Bruins roster were drafted during O'Connell's tenure as general manager, including Patrice Bergeron and David Krejčí, centerpieces of the team's Stanley Cup victory in 2011.

O'Connell was the director of professional player development with the Los Angeles Kings. In this role he has won 2 Stanley Cups in 2012 and 2014.

O'Connell was hired by the Philadelphia Flyers in August of 2021 as a senior advisor to the general manager.

== NHL coaching record ==
Team	Year	Regular season					Postseason			
Team	Year	Won	Lost	Tied	OTL	Win %	Finish	Won	Lost	Result
BOS	2002-03	3	3	3	0	.500	3rd in Northeast Division	1	4	Lost In First Round (NJD)
Total		3	3	3	0	.500	0 Division; Championships	1	4	0 Stanley Cups

== Awards and achievements ==
- OMJHL First All-Star Team (1975)
- CHL First All-Star Team (1977)
- Most Valuable Defenseman - CHL (1977)
- Played in NHL All-Star Game (1984)
- Stanley Cup champion (2012 and 2014)
- Named One of the Top 100 Best Bruins Players of all Time.

== Career statistics ==
=== Regular season and playoffs ===
			Regular season					Playoffs
Season	Team	League	GP	G	A	Pts	PIM	GP	G	A	Pts	PIM
1973–74	Kingston Canadiens	OHA-Jr.	70	16	43	59	81	—	—	—	—	—
1974–75	Kingston Canadiens	OMJHL	50	18	55	73	47	8	1	3	4	8
1975–76	Dallas Black Hawks	CHL	70	6	37	43	50	10	2	8	10	8
1976–77	Dallas Black Hawks	CHL	63	15	53	68	30	5	1	4	5	0
1977–78	Dallas Black Hawks	CHL	62	6	45	51	75	13	1	11	12	8
1977–78	Chicago Black Hawks	NHL	6	1	1	2	2	—	—	—	—	—
1978–79	New Brunswick Hawks	AHL	35	5	20	25	21	—	—	—	—	—
1978–79	Chicago Black Hawks	NHL	48	4	22	26	20	4	0	0	0	4
1979–80	Chicago Black Hawks	NHL	78	8	22	30	52	7	0	1	1	0
1980–81	Chicago Black Hawks	NHL	34	5	16	21	32	—	—	—	—	—
1980–81	Boston Bruins	NHL	48	10	22	32	42	3	1	3	4	2
1981–82	Boston Bruins	NHL	80	5	35	40	75	11	2	2	4	20
1982–83	Boston Bruins	NHL	80	14	39	53	42	17	3	5	8	12
1983–84	Boston Bruins	NHL	75	18	42	60	42	3	0	0	0	0
1984–85	Boston Bruins	NHL	78	15	50	65	64	5	1	5	6	0
1985–86	Boston Bruins	NHL	63	8	21	29	47	—	—	—	—	—
1985–86	Detroit Red Wings	NHL	13	1	7	8	16	—	—	—	—	—
1986–87	Detroit Red Wings	NHL	77	5	26	31	70	16	1	4	5	14
1987–88	Detroit Red Wings	NHL	48	6	13	19	38	10	0	4	4	8
1988–89	Detroit Red Wings	NHL	66	1	15	16	41	6	0	0	0	4
1989–90	Detroit Red Wings	NHL	66	4	14	18	22	—	—	—	—	—
NHL totals			860	105	335	440	605	82	8	24	32	64

=== International ===
Year	Team	Event	GP	G	A	Pts	PIM
1981	United States	CC	4	1	3	4	2
1985	United States	WC	8	1	0	1	2
Senior totals			12	2	3	5	4

Preceded by Harry Sinden	General manager of the Boston Bruins; 2000–06	Succeeded by Jeff Gorton
Preceded by Robbie Ftorek	Head coach of the Boston Bruins; 2003	Succeeded by Mike Sullivan
Preceded by None	Head coach of the Providence Bruins; 1992–94	Succeeded by Bob Francis
