= Jeff Jackson (ice hockey, born 1965) =

Canadian ice hockey executive and former player

- Born: April 24, 1965 (age 61) Chatham-Kent, Ontario, Canada
- Height: 6 ft 1 in (185 cm)
- Weight: 194 lb (88 kg; 13 st 12 lb)
- Position: Left wing
- Shot: Left
- Played for: Toronto Maple Leafs; New York Rangers; Quebec Nordiques; Chicago Blackhawks
- National team: Canada
- NHL draft: 28th overall, 1983; Toronto Maple Leafs
- Playing career: 1984–1992

Jeff Jackson (born April 24, 1965) is a Canadian ice hockey executive and retired ice hockey winger who is the CEO of hockey operations of the Edmonton Oilers of the National Hockey League (NHL). Jackson played 263 games in the NHL for the Toronto Maple Leafs, New York Rangers, Quebec Nordiques, and Chicago Blackhawks.

== Early life ==
Jackson was born in Chatham-Kent, Ontario, and raised in Dresden, Ontario. After retirement in 1993, Jackson attended the University of Western Ontario Faculty of Law.

== Career ==
Before playing in the NHL, he played for Canada's World Junior Under-20 team, which won a gold medal at the 1985 World Junior Ice Hockey Championships in Helsinki, Finland.

Upon graduating from law school, he accepted a position at Heenan Blaikie Law firm, where he practiced sports and entertainment law. In June 2006, he was hired by the Toronto Maple Leafs as their director of hockey administration. On August 24, 2007, Jackson was promoted to assistant general manager and director of hockey operations, working alongside then general manager John Ferguson Jr. When Ferguson was fired on January 22, 2008, Jackson remained as the team's assistant general manager under Cliff Fletcher. On September 12, 2008, Jackson was appointed the new general manager and governor of the Toronto Marlies, the American Hockey League farm club of the Maple Leafs. He also maintained his role as assistant GM and director of hockey operations. In March 2010, months after Brian Burke became the team's GM and president, Jackson left his position with the Leafs.

On August 3, 2023, Jackson was hired by the Edmonton Oilers to be CEO of hockey operations. After the Oilers announced on June 27, 2024, that then-general manager Ken Holland's contract would not be renewed, Jackson assumed the role of interim general manager. Jackson stepped down as interim general manager on July 24, with the Oilers' hiring of Stan Bowman.

Jackson has appeared as a guest speaker and lecturer at numerous universities and conferences, including Harvard Law School and Osgoode Hall Law School.

== Career statistics ==
			Regular season					Playoffs
Season	Team	League	GP	G	A	Pts	PIM	GP	G	A	Pts	PIM
1981–82	Newmarket Flyers	OPJHL	45	30	39	69	105	—	—	—	—	—
1982–83	Brantford Alexanders	OHL	64	18	25	43	63	8	1	1	2	27
1983–84	Brantford Alexanders	OHL	58	27	42	69	78	2	0	1	1	0
1984–85	Toronto Maple Leafs	NHL	17	0	1	1	24	—	—	—	—	—
1984–85	Hamilton Steelhawks	OHL	20	13	14	27	51	17	8	12	20	26
1985–86	Toronto Maple Leafs	NHL	5	1	2	3	2	—	—	—	—	—
1985–86	St. Catharines Saints	AHL	74	17	28	45	122	13	5	2	7	30
1986–87	Toronto Maple Leafs	NHL	55	8	7	15	64	—	—	—	—	—
1986–87	New York Rangers	NHL	9	5	1	6	15	6	1	1	2	16
1986–87	Newmarket Saints	AHL	7	3	6	9	13	—	—	—	—	—
1987–88	Quebec Nordiques	NHL	68	9	18	27	103	—	—	—	—	—
1988–89	Quebec Nordiques	NHL	33	4	6	10	28	—	—	—	—	—
1989–90	Quebec Nordiques	NHL	65	8	12	20	71	—	—	—	—	—
1990–91	Quebec Nordiques	NHL	10	3	1	4	4	—	—	—	—	—
1990–91	Halifax Citadels	AHL	25	8	17	25	45	—	—	—	—	—
1991–92	Chicago Blackhawks	NHL	1	0	0	0	2	—	—	—	—	—
1991–92	Indianapolis Ice	IHL	18	3	7	10	41	—	—	—	—	—
1991–92	New Haven Nighthawks	AHL	30	10	14	24	60	5	0	5	5	6
NHL totals			263	38	48	86	313	6	1	1	2	16
AHL totals			136	38	65	103	240	18	5	7	12	36

Sporting positions
Preceded by Ken Holland	General manager of the Edmonton Oilers (interim); 2024	Succeeded by Stan Bowman
