= List of Boston Bruins general managers =

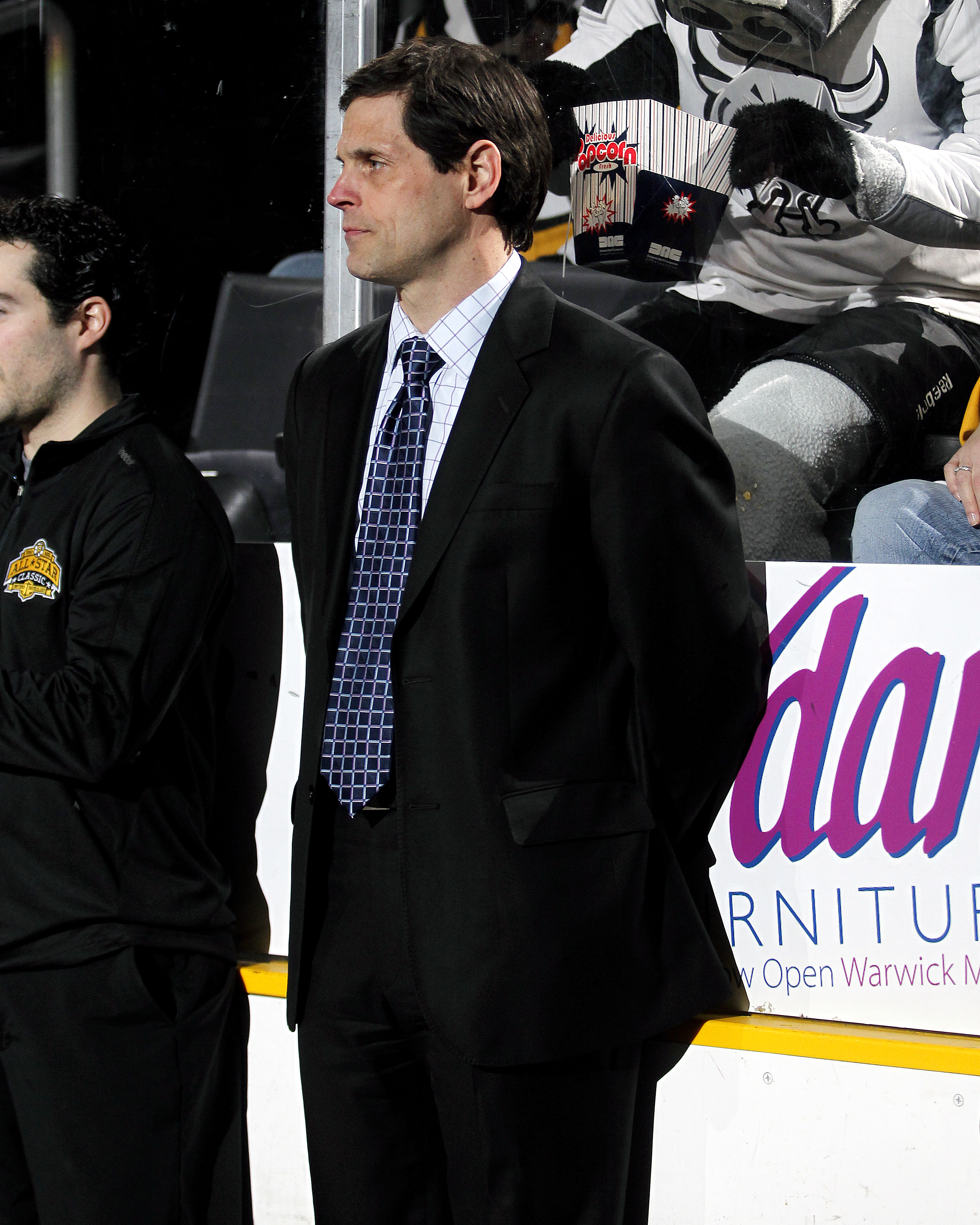
Don Sweeney is the current general manager of the Boston Bruins.

The Boston Bruins, a professional ice hockey team based in Boston, Massachusetts, have had eight general managers in its team history. The franchise is a member of the Atlantic Division of the Eastern Conference of the National Hockey League (NHL). The franchise was founded in 1924 and entered the NHL as the first American-based expansion team, playing its initial seasons at the still-active Boston Arena. It is an Original Six team, along with the Toronto Maple Leafs, Detroit Red Wings, New York Rangers, Montreal Canadiens and Chicago Blackhawks. Its home arena is the 17,565-person capacity TD Garden, where it has played since 1995, after leaving the Boston Garden.

== Key ==
Key of terms and definitions
Term	Definition
No.	Number of general managers^{[a]}
Ref(s)	References
–	Does not apply
†	Elected to the Hockey Hall of Fame in the Builder category

== General managers ==
General managers of the Boston Bruins
No.	Name	Tenure	Accomplishments during this term	Ref(s)
1	Art Ross	November 1, 1924 – April 1, 1954	Won Stanley Cup three times in 8 Cup Final appearances (1927, 1929, 1930, 1939, 1941, 1943, 1946, 1953); 7 division titles and 24 playoff appearances	
2	Lynn Patrick	April 1, 1954 – April 5, 1965	2 Stanley Cup Final appearances (1957, 1958); 4 playoff appearances	
3	Hap Emms	April 5, 1965 – June 1967	No playoff appearances	
4	Milt Schmidt	June 1967 – October 5, 1972	Won Stanley Cup 2 times (1970, 1972); 2 division titles and 5 playoff appearances	
5	Harry Sinden†	October 5, 1972 – November 1, 2000	5 Stanley Cup Final appearances (1974, 1977, 1978, 1988, 1990); Won Presidents' Trophy (1989–90); 2 conference titles, 10 division titles, and 26 playoff appearances	
6	Mike O'Connell	November 1, 2000 – March 25, 2006	2 division titles and 3 playoff appearances	
–	Jeff Gorton (Interim)	March 25, 2006 – May 26, 2006		
7	Peter Chiarelli	May 26, 2006 – April 15, 2015	Won Stanley Cup 1 time in 2 finals appearances (2011, 2013); Won Presidents' Trophy (2013–14); 2 conference titles, 4 division titles, and 7 playoff appearances	
8	Don Sweeney	May 20, 2015 – present	1 Stanley Cup Final appearance (2019); Won Presidents' Trophy 2 times (2019–2020, 2022–23); Won General Manager of the Year Award (2018–19); 1 conference title and 8 playoff appearances	

== See also ==
- List of NHL general managers

== Notes ==
- ^{a} A running total of the number of general managers of the franchise. Thus any general manager who has two or more separate terms as general manager is only counted once. Interim general managers do not count towards the total.
