= Ken Holland =

Canadian ice hockey executive

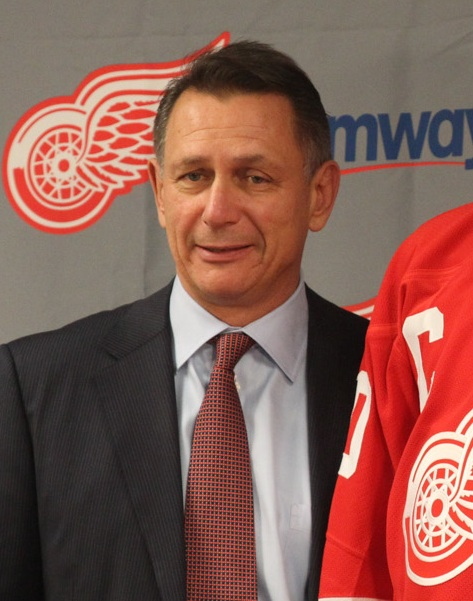
- Holland in January 2013
- Born: Kenneth Mark Holland; November 10, 1955 (age 70); Vernon, British Columbia, Canada
- Citizenship: Canadian-American
- Years active: 1983–present
- Known for: General manager of the Detroit Red Wings (1997–2019); President of hockey operations and general manager of the Edmonton Oilers (2019–2024)
- Awards: Hall of Fame 2020 (Builder)
Ice hockey career
- Hockey Hall of Fame, 2020 (Builder)
- Height: 5 ft 8 in (173 cm)
- Weight: 160 lb (73 kg; 11 st 6 lb)
- Position: Goaltender
- Caught: Left
- Played for: Hartford Whalers; Detroit Red Wings
- NHL draft: 188th overall, 1975; Toronto Maple Leafs
- Playing career: 1977–1985

Kenneth Mark Holland (born November 10, 1955) is a Canadian ice hockey executive and former goaltender, and is currently serving as the vice president and general manager of the Los Angeles Kings in the National Hockey League (NHL). Holland most notably served as the executive vice president and general manager of the Detroit Red Wings of the National Hockey League from 1997 to 2019, winning four Stanley Cup championships. He then served as president of hockey operations and general manager of the Edmonton Oilers from 2019 to 2024, with the Oilers reaching the 2024 Stanley Cup Final. In 2009, Holland was listed as second-best overall on Sports Illustrated's list of the top sports executives of the 2000s.

As a goaltender, Holland was drafted in the 12th round, 188th overall by the Toronto Maple Leafs in the 1975 NHL entry draft. He played four NHL games with the Hartford Whalers and the Red Wings between 1980 and 1984.

== Managerial career ==
=== Detroit Red Wings ===
After his playing career ended, Holland took a job with the Red Wings as a scout in Western Canada. He subsequently served seven years as Director of Amateur Scouting and three as assistant general manager. On July 18, 1997, he was promoted to general manager, executive vice president and alternate governor of the Detroit Red Wings. The 2012–13 season was his 16th as general manager and his 30th year overall with the Red Wings organization. He has won the Stanley Cup four times with Detroit: the first in 1997 as assistant general manager and goaltending coach, and the latter three as general manager in 1998, 2002 and 2008.

With Detroit, Holland gained a reputation as one of the most successful general managers in the NHL. Under his leadership as GM the Red Wings won the Central Division ten times, the regular-season Conference title five times, the Presidents' Trophy four times, and the Stanley Cup three times, and won more regular-season games (789) and postseason games (118) than any other NHL team.

On August 14, 2014, the Red Wings announced they signed Holland to a four-year contract extension through the end of the 2017–18 season. On April 7, 2018, the Red Wings announced they signed Holland to a two-year contract extension through the end of the 2019–20 season. On April 19, 2019, the Red Wings announced that Holland had been promoted to senior vice president of the team, and signed a multi-year contract extension. This promotion was done in part to accommodate hiring Steve Yzerman as general manager.

=== Edmonton Oilers ===
On May 7, 2019, the Edmonton Oilers named Holland general manager and president of hockey operations. The deal was for a reported five-year term and filled a GM spot that had been open since January.

Holland spent five years with Edmonton, reaching the Western Conference finals twice and the Stanley Cup Final once, in 2024. Following the Oilers' loss in the Finals, and with his contract expiring, the Oilers and Holland mutually decided to part ways on June 27, 2024. Holland was succeeded in these positions by Stan Bowman, the son of Scotty Bowman whom Holland had worked with closely in Detroit.

=== Los Angeles Kings ===
On May 14, 2025, Holland was named vice president and general manager of the Los Angeles Kings, replacing Rob Blake whose contract was not renewed.

== Personal life ==
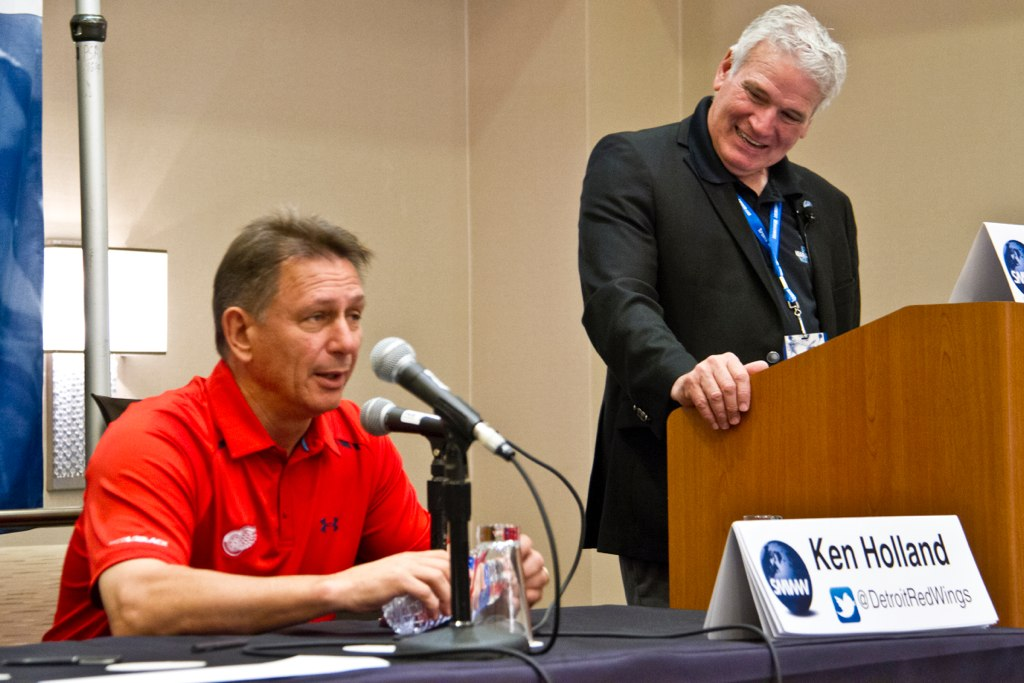
Ken Holland speaking at the SMWW Hockey Career Conference in 2015 with Dr. Lashbrook.

Holland and his wife Cindi live in British Columbia and have four children: Brad, Julie, Rachel, and Greg. On July 12, 2011, Holland, his wife Cindi, and their youngest daughter Rachel became United States citizens. Holland's youngest son, Greg, was sworn in on July 15, 2011.

He is also an annual "SMWW Hockey Career Conference" speaker for the online sports-career training school Sports Management Worldwide, founded and run by Dr. Lynn Lashbrook.

== Career statistics ==
=== Regular season and playoffs ===
			Regular season									Playoffs
Season	Team	League	GP	W	L	T	MIN	GA	SO	GAA	SV%	GP	W	L	MIN	GA	SO	GAA	SV%
1973–74	Vernon Vikings	BCJHL	16	—	—	—	960	59	0	3.69	—	—	—	—	—	—	—	—	—
1974–75	Medicine Hat Tigers	WCHL	37	23	10	4	2114	138	1	3.91	.883	4	1	3	230	16	0	4.17	—
1975–76	Medicine Hat Tigers	WCHL	41	22	11	1	2152	150	2	4.18	.878	9	4	4	528	30	0	3.41	—
1976–77	Broome Dusters	NAHL	48	29	14	0	2620	165	0	3.78	.876	6	—	—	320	22	0	4.13	—
1977–78	Binghamton Dusters	AHL	39	12	19	3	2057	147	0	4.28	.881	—	—	—	—	—	—	—	—
1978–79	Binghamton Dusters	AHL	41	19	17	3	2315	151	0	3.91	.874	10	5	5	572	39	1	4.09	—
1979–80	Springfield Indians	AHL	37	15	13	5	2092	130	2	3.70	.877	—	—	—	—	—	—	—	—
1980–81	Hartford Whalers	NHL	1	0	1	0	60	7	0	7.00	.848	—	—	—	—	—	—	—	—
1980–81	Binghamton Whalers	AHL	47	15	25	4	2543	168	2	3.96	.870	2	0	2	79	3	0	2.28	—
1981–82	Binghamton Whalers	AHL	46	27	13	4	2733	133	2	2.92	—	15	8	7	888	57	0	3.85	—
1982–83	Binghamton Whalers	AHL	48	23	18	5	2700	196	0	4.36	.866	3	1	2	180	16	0	5.33	—
1983–84	Detroit Red Wings	NHL	3	0	1	1	146	10	0	4.12	.804	—	—	—	—	—	—	—	—
1983–84	Adirondack Red Wings	AHL	42	19	15	6	2495	154	3	3.70	.870	7	3	4	416	25	0	3.61	—
1984–85	Adirondack Red Wings	AHL	43	13	22	6	2478	176	0	4.26	.868	—	—	—	—	—	—	—	—
NHL totals			4	0	2	1	206	17	0	4.96	.825	—	—	—	—	—	—	—	—

=== Awards ===
- NAHL Second All-Star Team (1977)
- AHL Second All-Star Team (1982)
- Inducted into Binghamton (New York) Hall of Fame, 1998
- Stanley Cup (Assistant General Manager) - 1997
- Stanley Cup (General Manager) - 1998, 2002, 2008
- Inducted into the Hockey Hall of Fame, 2020
- Inducted into the Michigan Sports Hall of Fame, 2024
- Awarded the Freedom of the City of Vernon, British Columbia on 26 October 2021.

Sporting positions
Preceded by Jim Devellano; Scotty Bowman	General manager of the Detroit Red Wings; 1997–2019	Succeeded by Steve Yzerman
Preceded by Keith Gretzky (interim)	General manager of the Edmonton Oilers; 2019–2024	Succeeded by Jeff Jackson (interim)
Preceded by Rob Blake	General manager of the Los Angeles Kings; 2025–present	Incumbent
