= Harry Sinden =

Canadian ice hockey player, executive (born 1932)

- Hockey Hall of Fame, 1983 (Builder)
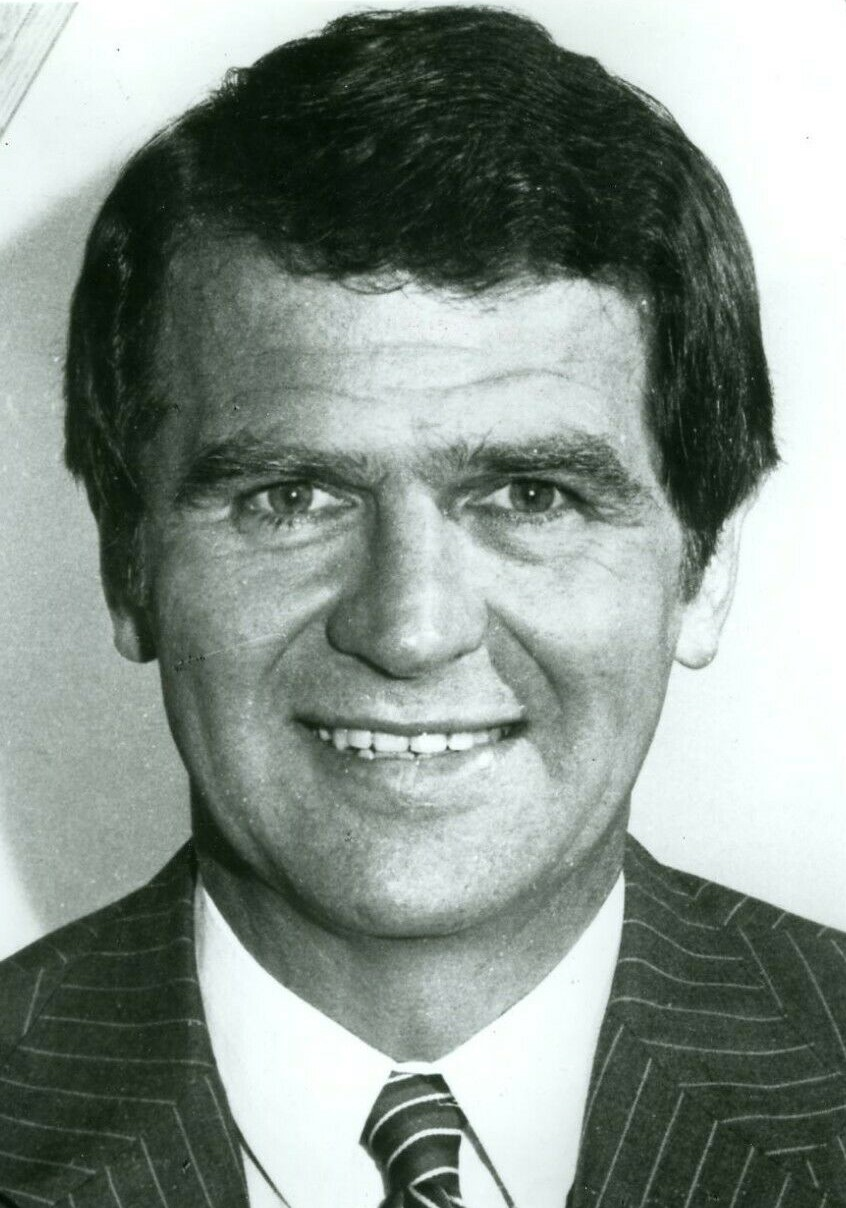
- Sinden in 1980
- Born: September 14, 1932 (age 94) Collins Bay, Ontario, Canada
- Height: 5 ft 10 in (178 cm)
- Weight: 180 lb (82 kg; 12 st 12 lb)
- Position: Defence
- Shot: Right
- National team: Canada
- Playing career: 1949–1966
- Coaching career: 1960–1985
Medal record
Men's ice hockey
Representing Canada
Olympic Games
Silver medal – second place	1960 Squaw Valley	Ice hockey
World Championships
Gold medal – first place	1958 Oslo

Harry James Sinden (born September 14, 1932) is a Canadian former ice hockey player, coach, and executive. He served as a coach, general manager, and team president for the Boston Bruins of the National Hockey League (NHL), and was the coach of Team Canada during the 1972 Summit Series. He is a member of the Hockey Hall of Fame in the builders category. He was inducted into the IIHF Hall of Fame in its inaugural class of 1997.

== Playing career ==
Sinden played defence for the Toronto Marlboros bantams before moving up to the Oshawa Generals of the Ontario Hockey Association for junior hockey. He played in Oshawa from 1949 to 1953, and then for six seasons in the OHA senior division with the Whitby Dunlops. He was team captain when the Dunlops won the Allan Cup in 1957, and then the 1958 Ice Hockey World Championships for Canada in Oslo, Norway. He led Dunlops to another Allan Cup in 1959 also winning a silver medal as a member of the Canadian national men's hockey team at the 1960 Winter Olympics in Squaw Valley, California. The core of the team was the Kitchener-Waterloo Dutchmen, with Sinden one of four players from the Dunlops added to the lineup to strengthen the team for the Olympics.

Near the end of the season, the Montreal Canadiens placed Sinden on their negotiation list but didn't reach an agreement with him. After playing some games with the Hull-Ottawa Canadiens in the Eastern Professional Hockey League he met Lynn Patrick, general manager of the Boston Bruins, who signed him as a player – assistant coach for the Kingston Frontenacs, the Bruins' EPHL affiliate, starting in 1960–61. He was named a first-team all-star and In 1962 he was named the league’s top defenseman (an honor shared with Jean Gauthier) for the 1961–62 season. The next season he kept up his great play repeating as the leagues top defensive player along with being named league MVP for 1962–63. Sinden also helped lead the team to the league title that year. After the league folded, the team became the Minneapolis Bruins of the Central Hockey League for the 1963–64 season with Sinden as player-coach. After two seasons the team moved again, becoming the Oklahoma City Blazers, where Sinden finished his playing career in 1965–66 after six seasons with the franchise. In that final season, he coached the team to the league championship.

== Coaching in the NHL ==
In May 1966, Sinden moved up to the NHL as head coach of the Boston Bruins. At 33 he was the youngest coach in the league at the time, coaching the youngest team. In his first season — with a team that included rookie Bobby Orr—the Bruins finished out of the playoffs with the worst record in the league. But in his second year, aided by the acquisitions of Phil Esposito, Ken Hodge and Fred Stanfield in a blockbuster deal with the Chicago Black Hawks, the team posted a winning record. In his third season, the Bruins finished with 100 points just behind the Montreal Canadiens for the top spot in the NHL. In his fourth season, 1969–70, he coached the Bruins to their first Stanley Cup in 29 years beating St. Louis in the finals 4 games to 0.

He also stepped in for two short interim stints as the Bruins coach in 1980 and 1985.

== Retirement and Summit Series ==
Despite his success with the team, Sinden had a rocky relationship with Bruins management during the championship season, which led to the 37-year-old Sinden announcing his retirement just days after winning the Cup. The club placed him on its voluntary retired list, preventing him from taking a job with another team for one year. He then accepted a job with the Stirling Homex Corporation, a home construction company in Rochester, New York. In October 1970, he published a story in Sports Illustrated declaring he had left the Bruins because of their mid-season refusal to give him a raise for the following year.

Sinden was offered the job as the first head coach of the New York Islanders at the beginning of 1972 but turned it down. He also rejected offers from the Toronto Maple Leafs and the St. Louis Blues. In June 1972, after two years away from hockey, he was named head coach and manager of the Canadian team for the eight-game Summit Series. After a slow start, he led the Canadians to a come-from-behind win capped by Paul Henderson's series-winning goal with 34 seconds remaining in the final game. Esposito, reunited with Sinden, was the leading scorer in the series.

Sinden maintained a tape-recorded diary throughout the series which was turned into a book, Hockey Showdown, published in 1972.

In 2012 Sinden’s name was inshrined on the Canada walk of fame as a member of the 1972 Summit series team.

== Returns to the Bruins ==
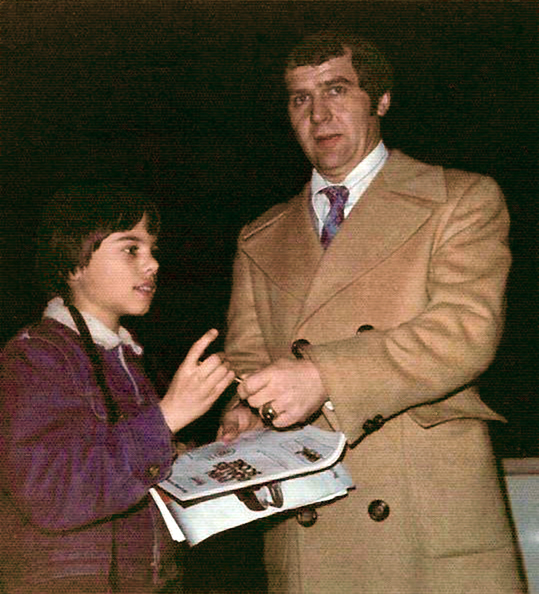
Sinden signing an autograph for a fan following a game at Boston Garden in 1975

Within days after the Summit Series, he signed a five-year deal to return to the Bruins as their general manager, succeeding Milt Schmidt, who was named to the post of executive director. Schmidt later departed to become the inaugural general manager of the Washington Capitals expansion team.

Sinden went on to spend just over 28 years as general manager of the Bruins before he stepped down on October 25, 2000, in favour of his assistant GM, Mike O'Connell. His 28-year tenure almost equalled the 30-year reign (1924–54) of Art Ross, the team's founding manager. Sinden, who had added the title of club president in December 1988, remained as the chief executive of the Bruins until the summer of 2006 when he retired to a consulting role.

As general manager of the Bruins, Sinden presided over the team's long years of consistent success, setting the North American major professional record for most consecutive seasons in the playoffs with 29, which included making the finals five times (1974, 1977, 1978, 1988, 1990 — losing the finals each time) and two regular-season first-place finishes (1983, 1990). With the Bruins, he became the first NHL general manager to reach 1,000 wins, setting the milestone on October 17, 1995. He finished with a impressive all time record of 1170-763-301, with a .591 winning percentage.

He was named executive of the year by Sporting News twice in 1977 and 1990.

Notwithstanding this longstanding success, he was the subject of controversies ranging from video replays to salary arbitration and was under frequent fire from Bruin fans. In the 1996–97 season, the NHL fined him $5,000 USD for verbal abuse of a video-replay official who had disallowed a goal in the second period of a game between the Bruins and the Ottawa Senators. He also refused to honor a salary-arbitration award and let Dmitri Khristich, a 29-goal scorer, leave the team without compensation. He had been highly critical of Khristich's performance in the playoffs and was angered when an arbitrator awarded him a salary of $2.8 million.

Sinden also served as a key member of many league committees which brought policy and rule recommendations to the NHL’s Board of Governors. The esteem in which he is held in the hockey world was evidenced by his 1983 induction into the Hockey Hall of Fame, as he became the 23rd Bruin enshrined and only the fourth to enter in the Builder’s category. In 1997, he was selected as one of the 30 inaugural inductees into the International Ice Hockey Federation Hall of Fame. In 1999, he was honored with the league's Lester Patrick Trophy for his service to hockey in the United States.

He was inducted into the Canada sports Hall of Fame in 2005.

Sinden is currently the Bruins' Senior Advisor to the Owner, as well as a former member of the selection committee for the Hockey Hall of Fame. He is also a "Hockey GM & Scouting" instructor for the online sports-career training school Sports Management Worldwide, founded and run by Dr. Lynn Lashbrook. In 2011, his name was inscribed on the Stanley Cup for a second time, 41 years after his first Stanley Cup title as a coach.

Sinden has served as an integral member of the Bruins organization for over 60 years. He still regularly appears at alumni events, Bruins ceremonies, and charity causes. In 2024, he was honored during the teams centennial festivities as a team legend.

== Awards and achievements ==
As a player

- Allan Cup champion 2x (1957 and 1959)
- Gold Medal at the 1958 Ice Hockey World Championships
- Silver medal as a member of the Canadian national men's hockey team at the 1960 Winter Olympics
- EPHL Defensive player of the year 2x (1962 and 1963)
- EPHL League MVP (1963)
- EPHL League championship (1963)
- Adams Cup champion (1966) (Sinden served as a player coach role during the season)

As a coach/executive

- Stanley Cup champion 2x (1970 as a coach) (2011 as a executive)
- Inducted into the Hockey Hall of Fame in 1983
- Inducted as a inaugural member of IIHF Hall of Fame in 1997
- Inducted in the Whitby sports Hall of Fame in 1998.
- Lester Patrick Trophy 1999
- Massachusetts Hockey Hall of Fame 2005
- Inducted into the Canada sports Hall of Fame in 2005

== Career coaching record ==
Team	Year	Regular season						Postseason			
Team	Year	G	W	L	T	Pts	Finish	W	L	Win %	Result
BOS	1966–67	70	17	43	10	44	6th in NHL				Missed playoffs
BOS	1967–68	74	37	27	10	84	3rd in East	0	4	.000	Lost in quarterfinals (MTL)
BOS	1968–69	76	42	18	16	100	2nd in East	6	4	.600	Lost in semifinals (MTL)
BOS	1969–70	76	40	17	19	99	2nd in East	12	2	.857	Won Stanley Cup (STL)
BOS	1979–80	7	6	0	1	(13)	2nd in Adams	4	6	.400	Lost in quarterfinals (NYI)
BOS	1984–85	24	11	10	3	(25)	4th in Adams	2	3	.400	Lost in quarterfinals (MTL)
Total		327	153	116	58			24	19	.558	5 playoff appearances 1 Stanley Cup title

== Playing career statistics ==
Season	Team	Lge	GP	G	A	Pts	PIM	+/-	GP	G	A	Pts	PIM
1949-50	Oshawa Generals	OHA	Statistics Unavailable										
1950-51	Oshawa Generals	OHA	Statistics Unavailable										
1951-52	Oshawa Generals	OHA	43	3	24	27	0						
1952-53	Oshawa Generals	OHA	56	11	32	43	0						
1954-55	Oshawa Truckmen [Whitby]	EOSHL	Statistics Unavailable										
1956-57	Whitby Dunlops	OHASr	--	11	33	44	82						
1957-58	Whitby Dunlops	OHASr	--	6	16	22	44						
1958-59	Whitby Dunlops	OHASr	--	13	34	47	38						
1959-60	Hull-Ottawa Canadiens	EPHL	--	--	--	--	--	--	5	0	2	2	2
1960-61	Kingston Frontenacs	EPHL	54	3	36	39	24		5	1	5	6	4
1961-62	Kingston Frontenacs	EPHL	68	11	61	72	98		11	1	10	11	11
1962-63	Providence Reds	AHL	1	0	0	0	0		--	--	--	--	--
1962-63	Kingston Frontenacs	EPHL	71	10	56	66	74		5	2	2	4	9
1963-64	Minneapolis Bruins	CPHL	57	6	25	31	64		5	0	2	2	0
1964-65	Minneapolis Bruins	CPHL	62	5	5	10	42		--	--	--	--	--
1965-66	Oklahoma City Blazers	CPHL	59	3	10	13	16		9	0	9	9	4

== Personal life ==
Sinden and his wife, Eleanor, have four daughters and reside in Winchester, Massachusetts. He was the godfather of Canadian rock musician Gord Downie, the late lead singer of The Tragically Hip.

== Popular culture ==
Sinden was played by Booth Savage in Canada Russia '72, a television miniseries based on the 1972 Summit Series. Sinden was played by Ian Tracy in "Keep Your Head Up, Kid: The Don Cherry Story", a television special by CBC based on the life of coach and sports commentator Don Cherry.

Sporting positions
Preceded by Milt Schmidt; Fred Creighton; Gerry Cheevers	Head coach of the Boston Bruins; 1966–70; 1980; 1985	Succeeded by Tom Johnson; Gerry Cheevers; Butch Goring
Preceded by Milt Schmidt	General Manager of the Boston Bruins; 1972–2000	Succeeded by Mike O'Connell
Preceded by William D. Hassett, Jr.	President of the Boston Bruins; December 1, 1988 – August 9, 2006	Succeeded by Cam Neely
