= Connor Murphy =

American ice hockey player (born 1993)

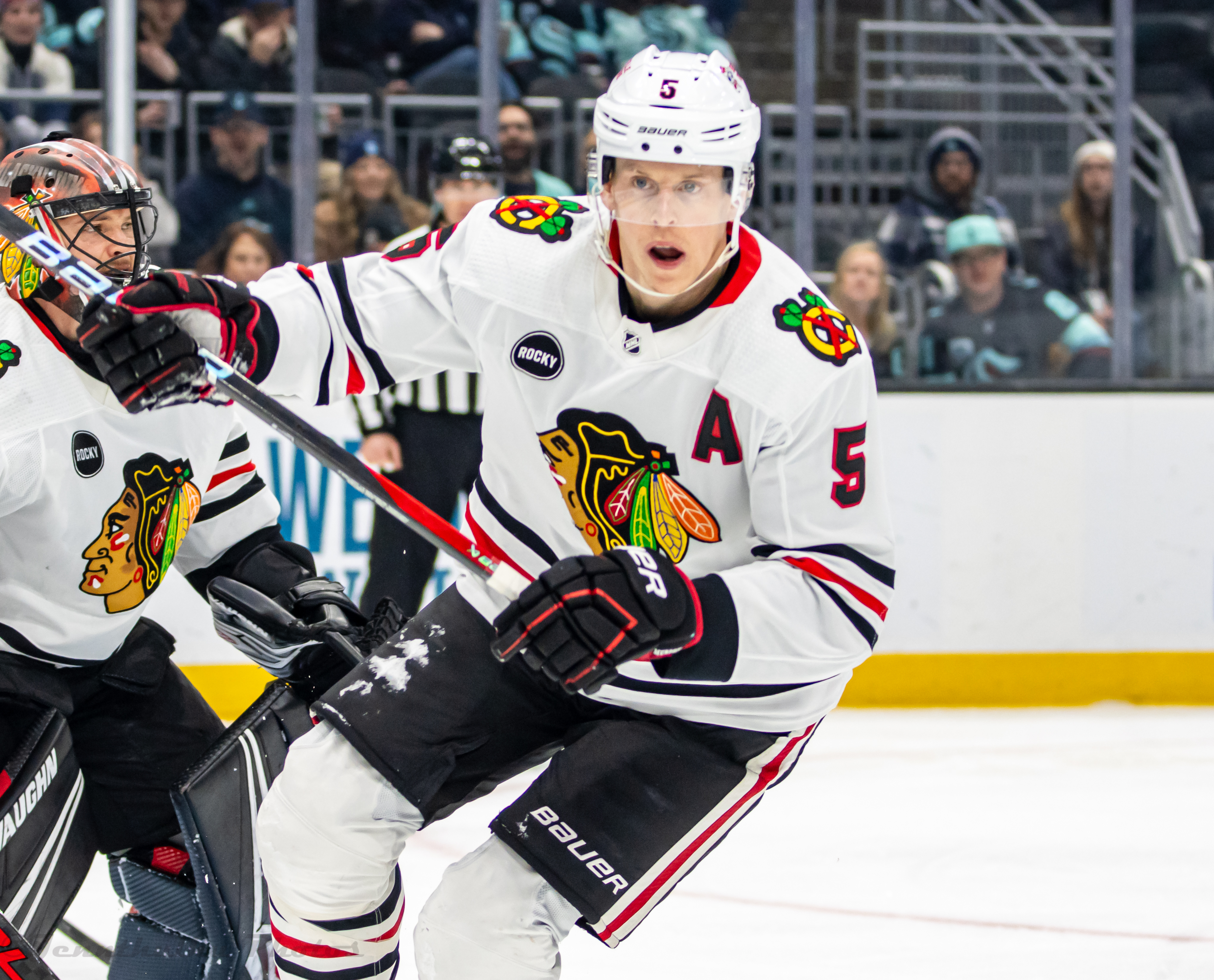
- Murphy with the Chicago Blackhawks in 2023
- Born: March 26, 1993 (age 33) Boston, Massachusetts, U.S.
- Height: 6 ft 4 in (193 cm)
- Weight: 210 lb (95 kg; 15 st 0 lb)
- Position: Defense
- Shoots: Right
- NHL team Former teams: Edmonton Oilers; Arizona Coyotes; Chicago Blackhawks
- National team: United States
- NHL draft: 20th overall, 2011; Phoenix Coyotes
- Playing career: 2013–present

Connor Murphy (born March 26, 1993) is an American professional ice hockey player and defenseman for the Edmonton Oilers in the National Hockey League (NHL). He was selected 20th overall in the 2011 NHL entry draft by the Phoenix Coyotes, and has also played in the NHL for the Chicago Blackhawks. He is the son of former NHL defenseman Gord Murphy.

== Playing career ==
=== Amateur ===
As a youth, Murphy played in the 2006 Quebec International Pee-Wee Hockey Tournament with the Ohio AAA Blue Jackets minor ice hockey team. He later played junior ice hockey with the Sarnia Sting in the Ontario Hockey League. Prior to signing with the Sting, Murphy committed to Miami University, but decided to play in the Ontario Hockey League for the Sarnia Sting instead. Murphy has previously played for the USA Hockey National Team Development Program of the United States Hockey League (USHL).

=== Phoenix Coyotes organization ===
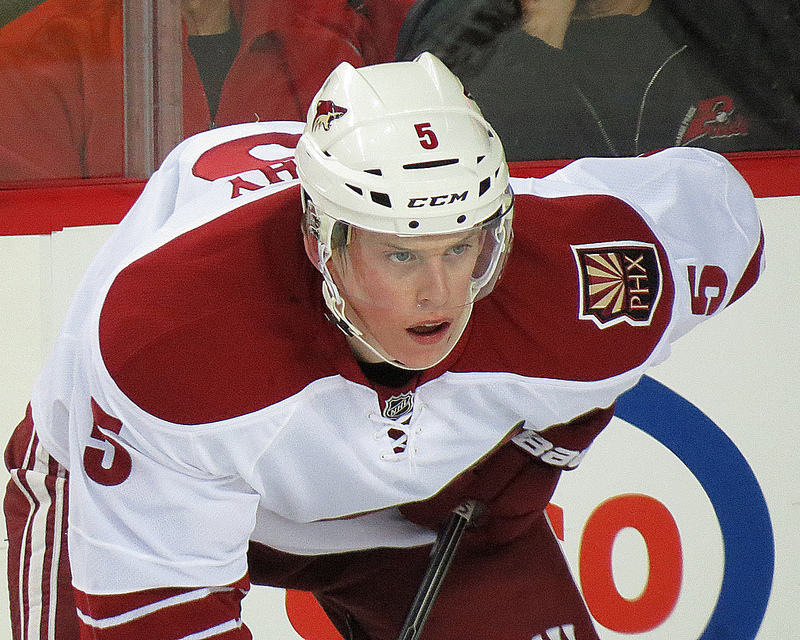
Murphy with the Phoenix Coyotes

On November 16, 2013, Murphy made his NHL debut with the Phoenix Coyotes, and in his first NHL game he scored his first NHL goal against Tampa Bay Lightning goalie Anders Lindbäck.

On July 28, 2016, Murphy signed a six-year, $23.1 million contract with the Coyotes.

=== Chicago Blackhawks ===
After his fourth season with the Coyotes, Murphy and Laurent Dauphin were traded to the Chicago Blackhawks in exchange for Niklas Hjalmarsson on June 23, 2017. Murphy struggled in his first season under head coach Joel Quenneville, sitting as a healthy scratch for three of the Blackhawks first 12 games. When he did make the lineup, Murphy was asked to play on his left side despite being a right-handed defenceman. In his first four games in this position, Murphy played alongside Brent Seabrook and scored his first goal of the season. Murphy and Seabrook found success over 244 minutes together in a third-pairing role before being split up in the second half of the season. Following his split from Seabrook, Murphy had trouble finding a permanent spot in the Blackhawks lineup and played alongside different defensive partners through the rest of the season. The Blackhawks also struggled to win games and were eliminated from playoff contention on March 21 with a losing 30–35–9 record. Murphy finished the 2017–18 season with two goals and 12 assists through 76 games, his lowest point total since 2014–15.

During the offseason, Murphy suffered a back injury which caused him to miss the first three months of the 2018–19 season. He returned to the lineup on December 7 and was immediately paired with rookie Carl Dahlström in a shutdown role. In his first 11 games back, Murphy tallied one goal and four assists for five points. Murphy's return had a positive impact on the team and the two defencemen earned praise from the Blackhawk's coaching staff on their effectiveness. New head coach Jeremy Colliton described the two as "a huge benefit to our team" because they were playing a physical game and winning puck battles.

As with the previous season, Murphy missed the first game of the 2019–20 season due to an injury suffered in training camp. While he was recovering, his former defensive partner Dahlström was claimed off of waivers by the Winnipeg Jets. As such, Murphy was originally united with Duncan Keith as his defensive partner. However, their time together was short as Murphy suffered a groin injury six games into the season. Murphy missed 10 games to recover from the injury, during which the Blackhawks lost five of the first six games in his absence. Upon returning, Murphy gained Olli Määttä as his new defensive partner and the two were placed in shutdown roles on the ice against other top defensive pairings. Through November, Murphy led the team in defensive statistics as he allowed only 51.6 shots per 60 minutes and only 24.0 scoring chances per 60 minutes. Once Keith was activated off injured reserve in mid-December, the two were reunited on the Blackhawks top line. This pairing once again was short lived as Keith found consistency with Adam Boqvist and Murphy struggled to find a consistent defensive partner. Through late February and early March, he was often paired with recently-acquired Nick Seeler or rookie Lucas Carlsson and saw an increase in ice time overall. When the NHL paused play due to the COVID-19 pandemic, Murphy had set a new career-high with 19 points through 58 games.

Due to the COVID-19 pandemic, the NHL created a modified playoff format in order to allow the 2020 Stanley Cup playoffs to occur. When the NHL began its return-to-play initiative in July 2020, both Murphy and Maatta were deemed “unfit” to play after participating in three practice sessions. Due to an agreement between the NHL and the National Hockey League Players' Association, teams were not allowed to reveal why players were deemed "unfit" to play for privacy reasons. Murphy was sidelined for six days before returning to Blackhawks practice on July 23. Despite the Blackhawks finishing the season as the last seed in the Western Conference, they qualified for the NHL's new best-of-five series and faced off against the fifth seed Edmonton Oilers. Murphy and the Blackhawks beat the Oilers in four games but were eventually eliminated by the Vegas Golden Knights in the first round best-of-seven series.

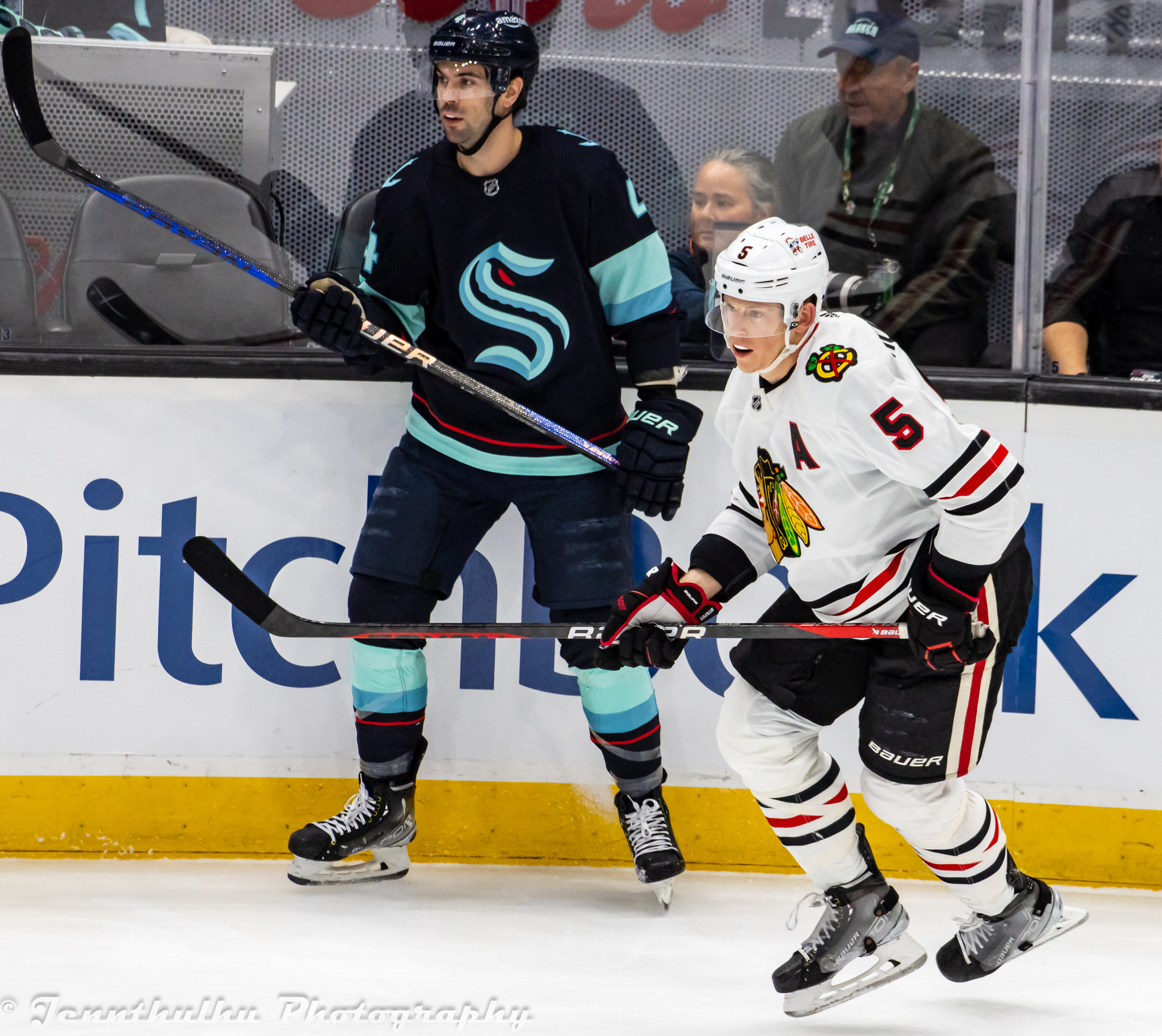
Murphy (right) during a game against the Seattle Kraken in 2023

As the NHL was still dealing with the effects of the COVID-19 pandemic, the 2020–21 season was reduced to 56 games and began on January 13, 2021. Shortly after the season began, Murphy tallied his 99th and 100th career NHL points with a goal and an assist in a 6–2 win over the Detroit Red Wings on January 24. Murphy continued to accumulate points and added two goals and three assists over 13 games before suffering a hip injury on February 7. He missed six games on injured reserve to recover from the injury and returned to the Blackhawks lineup on February 25. At the conclusion of the season, Murphy was the Blackhawks nominee for the King Clancy Memorial Trophy as a player who "best exemplifies leadership qualities on and off the ice."

On August 31, 2021, Murphy signed a four-year, $17.6 million contract extension with the Blackhawks. Following the signing of his new contract, Murphy was appointed an alternate captain for the Blackhawks in their 2021–22 season. He wore the 'A' on his jersey for road games while Alex DeBrincat wore it for home games. On March 12, 2022, Murphy suffered a concussion after being checked into the boards by Ottawa Senators player Parker Kelly. At the time of the concussion, Murphy had tallied 10 points through 56 games while averaging just over 22 minutes of ice time per game. He subsequently missed the remainder of the season to recover and was again nominated by the Blackhawks for the King Clancy Memorial Trophy.

=== Edmonton Oilers ===
On March 2, 2026, Murphy was traded to the Edmonton Oilers in exchange for a second-round draft pick in the 2028 NHL entry draft. He scored his first career playoff goal during Game 2 of the Oilers first round series against the Anaheim Ducks during the 2026 Stanley Cup playoffs.

== International play ==
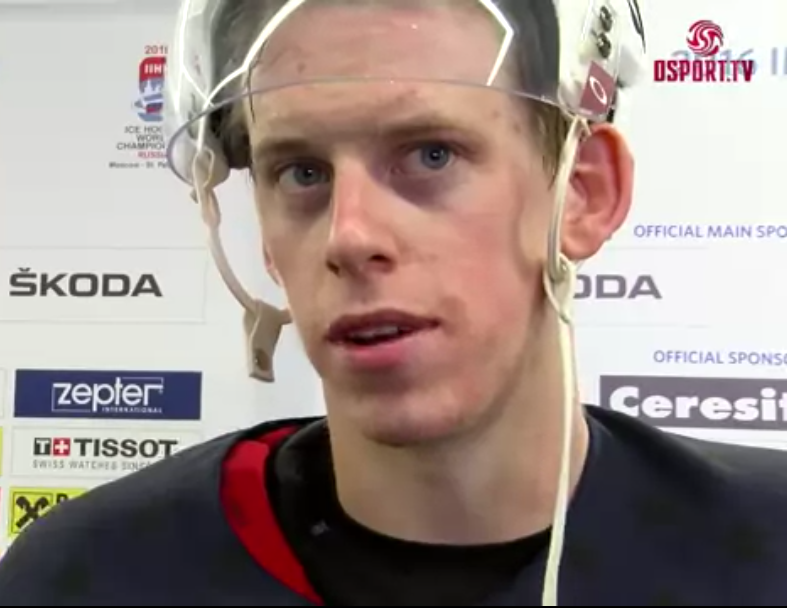

Medal record

Representing United States

Ice hockey

World Championships
Bronze medal – third place	2015 Czech Republic	
Bronze medal – third place	2018 Denmark	

World Junior Championships
Gold medal – first place	2013 Russia	

IIHF World U18 Championship
Gold medal – first place	2011 Germany	

Murphy represented the United States internationally playing for Team USA in the 2011 IIHF World U18 Championships with Team USA. He scored three goals and had one assist in six games during the tournament, including the overtime goal in the gold medal game against Sweden. He was selected as captain for the 2017 IIHF World Championship, leading Team USA to a 5th-place finish.

== Personal life ==
Murphy was born in Boston when his father, Gord Murphy, was a member of the Boston Bruins. He grew up in the suburbs of Miami and Atlanta before his family settled in Dublin, Ohio, when his father was an assistant coach with the Columbus Blue Jackets. He has a brother named Tyler and a sister named Lexi.

== Career statistics ==
=== Regular season and playoffs ===
			Regular season					Playoffs
Season	Team	League	GP	G	A	Pts	PIM	GP	G	A	Pts	PIM
2009–10	U.S. NTDP Juniors	USHL	2	0	0	0	2	—	—	—	—	—
2009–10	U.S. NTDP U17	USDP	8	1	0	1	4	—	—	—	—	—
2010–11	U.S. NTDP Juniors	USHL	9	3	1	4	6	—	—	—	—	—
2010–11	U.S. NTDP U17	USDP	2	0	0	0	4	—	—	—	—	—
2010–11	U.S. NTDP U18	USDP	22	6	4	10	6	—	—	—	—	—
2011–12	Sarnia Sting	OHL	35	8	18	26	26	6	1	2	3	6
2012–13	Sarnia Sting	OHL	33	6	12	18	32	—	—	—	—	—
2013–14	Portland Pirates	AHL	36	0	13	13	48	—	—	—	—	—
2013–14	Phoenix Coyotes	NHL	30	1	7	8	10	—	—	—	—	—
2014–15	Arizona Coyotes	NHL	73	4	3	7	42	—	—	—	—	—
2015–16	Arizona Coyotes	NHL	78	6	11	17	48	—	—	—	—	—
2016–17	Arizona Coyotes	NHL	77	2	15	17	45	—	—	—	—	—
2017–18	Chicago Blackhawks	NHL	76	2	12	14	34	—	—	—	—	—
2018–19	Chicago Blackhawks	NHL	52	5	8	13	40	—	—	—	—	—
2019–20	Chicago Blackhawks	NHL	58	5	14	19	27	9	0	4	4	4
2020–21	Chicago Blackhawks	NHL	50	3	12	15	35	—	—	—	—	—
2021–22	Chicago Blackhawks	NHL	57	4	6	10	47	—	—	—	—	—
2022–23	Chicago Blackhawks	NHL	80	7	6	13	69	—	—	—	—	—
2023–24	Chicago Blackhawks	NHL	46	2	6	8	40	—	—	—	—	—
2024–25	Chicago Blackhawks	NHL	68	2	17	19	52	—	—	—	—	—
2025–26	Chicago Blackhawks	NHL	60	4	9	13	46	—	—	—	—	—
2025–26	Edmonton Oilers	NHL	20	1	3	4	25	6	2	1	3	0
NHL totals			825	48	129	177	560	15	2	5	7	4

=== International ===
Year	Team	Event	Result	GP	G	A	Pts	PIM
2010	United States	IH18	2nd place, silver medalist(s)	5	1	3	4
2011	United States	U18	1st place, gold medalist(s)	6	3	1	4	2
2013	United States	WJC	1st place, gold medalist(s)	7	0	1	1	2
2014	United States	WC	6th	5	0	0	0	0
2015	United States	WC	3rd place, bronze medalist(s)	10	0	0	0	0
2016	United States	WC	4th	10	3	2	5	12
2017	United States	WC	5th	8	1	1	2	2
2018	United States	WC	3rd place, bronze medalist(s)	10	0	1	1	8
Junior totals				18	4	5	9	4
Senior totals				43	4	4	8	22

Awards and achievements
Preceded by Mark Visentin	Phoenix Coyotes first-round draft pick 2011	Succeeded by Henrik Samuelsson
