= Dennis Wideman =

Canadian ice hockey player (born 1983)

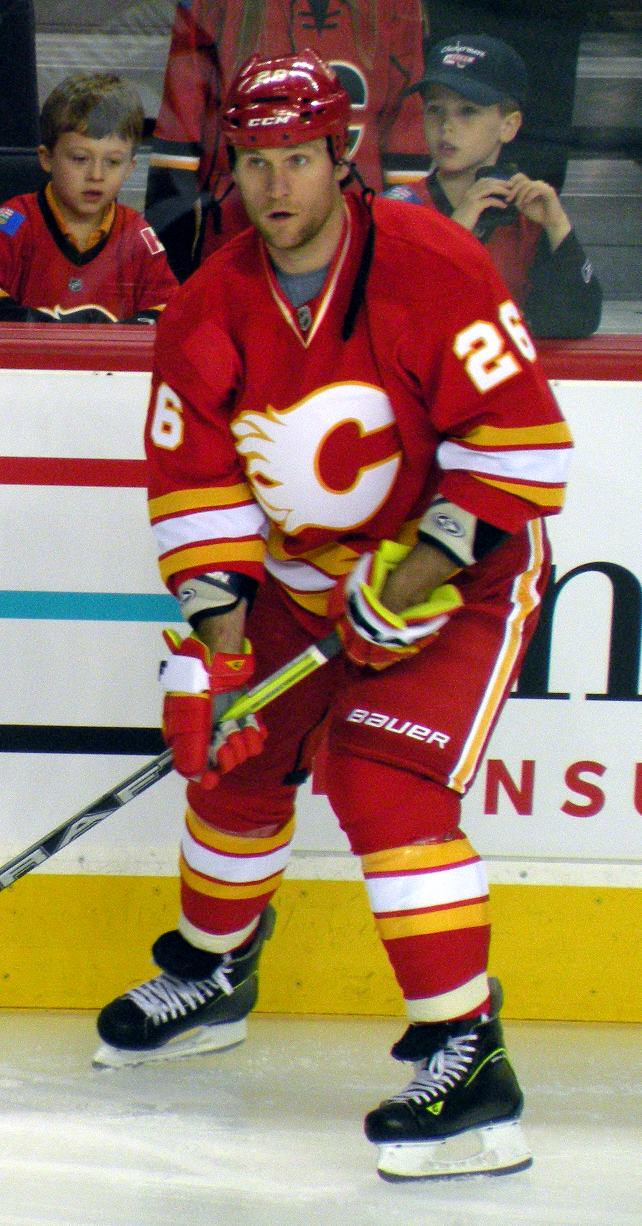
- Wideman with the Calgary Flames in 2013
- Born: March 20, 1983 (age 43) Kitchener, Ontario, Canada
- Height: 6 ft 0 in (183 cm)
- Weight: 200 lb (91 kg; 14 st 4 lb)
- Position: Defence
- Shot: Right
- Played for: St. Louis Blues; Boston Bruins; Florida Panthers; Washington Capitals; Calgary Flames
- NHL draft: 241st overall, 2002; Buffalo Sabres
- Playing career: 2004–2017

Dennis Earl Wideman (born March 20, 1983) is a Canadian former professional ice hockey defenceman who played in the National Hockey League (NHL). Wideman was drafted in the eighth round, 241st overall, by the Buffalo Sabres in the 2002 NHL entry draft.

== Playing career ==
=== Amateur ===
Wideman grew up playing his minor ice hockey in his hometown of Elmira, Ontario, playing for the Woolwich Township Wildcats "A” of the OMHA's Tri-County League and the Guelph Reps AAA Bantams of the OMHA's South Central AAA League in 1997–98. He played in the 1997 Quebec International Pee-Wee Hockey Tournament with Guelph.

Wideman spent the 1998–99 season with the Elmira Sugar Kings of the Mid-Western Junior Hockey League (MWJHL), scoring 18 goals and 48 points in 47 games. He was then drafted by the Sudbury Wolves of the Ontario Hockey League (OHL).

Wideman began his junior ice hockey career with the Wolves in the 1999–2000 season. In his rookie season in Sudbury, he had ten goals and 36 points in 63 games. He then added three points in 12 games in the playoffs. Wideman began 2000–01 in Sudbury, scoring seven goals and 18 points in 25 games before being traded to the London Knights.

Wideman finished the 2000–01 season with London, earning eight goals and 16 points in 24 games with the Knights. In the playoffs, Wideman had four assists in five games. He exploded offensively in the 2001–02 season, scoring 27 goals and 69 points in 65 games with London, while registering 141 penalty minutes. In 12 playoff games, Wideman had four goals and 13 points. He had another solid offensive season in 2002–03, as Wideman had 20 goals and 47 points in 55 games. He then added six goals and 12 points in 13 playoff games Wideman returned to London as an over-ager in 2003–04, and had another very solid season. He scored 24 goals and had 65 points in 60 games, while posting a +52 rating. In 15 playoff games, Wideman scored seven goals and 17 points to finish his junior career.

=== Professional ===
==== St. Louis Blues ====
Wideman signed as a free agent with the St. Louis Blues on June 30, 2004. He played his first professional season with the Worcester IceCats of the American Hockey League (AHL) in 2004–05. In 79 games with Worcester, Wideman had 13 goals and 43 points. He then began the 2005–06 season with Blues' new affiliate, the Peoria Rivermen, also of the AHL, scoring two goals and six points in 12 games. Wideman was then called up to the NHL and appeared in 67 games with the Blues in 2005–06, scoring eight goals and 24 points. In 2006–07, Wideman made the Blues out of training camp, and in 55 games, he scored five goals and 22 points. On February 27, 2007, the Blues traded Wideman to the Boston Bruins in exchange for forward Brad Boyes.

==== Boston Bruins ====
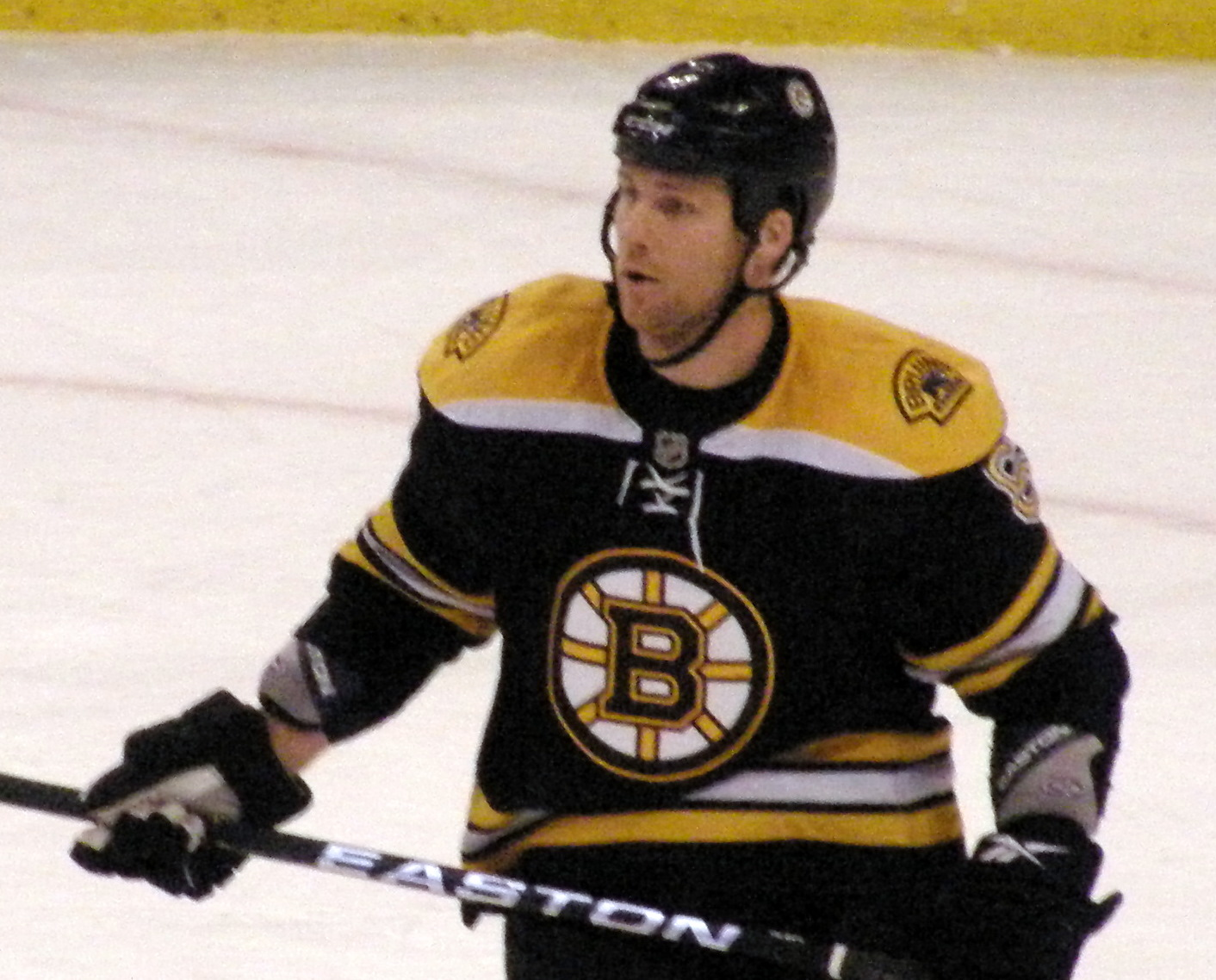
Wideman with the Bruins

Wideman finished the 2006–07 season with the Bruins, as he recorded three points in 20 games with the team. He broke out offensively in the 2007–08 season, scoring 13 goals and 36 points in 81 games, helping the Bruins return to the Stanley Cup playoffs. On December 31, 2007, he scored a memorable goal at 4:40 of the second period against Atlanta Thrashers goaltender Kari Lehtonen during a power play — it was the 18,000th goal in Bruins history. In the 2008 playoffs, Wideman had three assists in six games. In 2008–09, Wideman once again had a very solid offensive season, scoring 13 goals and 50 points in 79 games to tie Zdeno Chára for most points by a defenceman on the team. Wideman also finished sixth in the NHL with a +32 rating. In 11 2009 playoff games, Wideman had seven assists. He struggled in the 2009–10 season, however, scoring only six goals and 30 points in 76 games. Despite his lower regular season point production, he had a very strong offensive 2010 playoff performance, scoring a goal and 12 points in 13 games. On June 22, 2010, the Bruins traded Wideman, their first-round draft pick in the 2010 NHL entry draft and their third-round pick in 2011 to the Florida Panthers in exchange for Nathan Horton and Gregory Campbell.

==== Florida Panthers and Washington Capitals ====
Wideman had a solid offensive season with the Panthers in 2010–11, as he scored nine goals and 33 points in 61 games. The Panthers traded Wideman to the Washington Capitals for Jake Hauswirth and the Capitals' third-round draft pick in 2011. At the time of the trade, Wideman was second on the Panthers' scoring list.

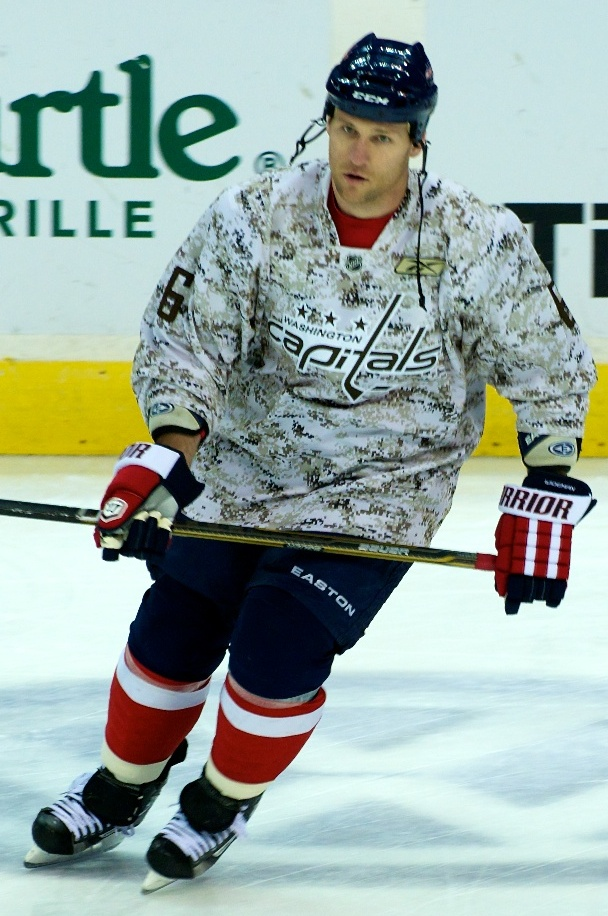
Wideman played two seasons in Washington.

On December 9, 2011, Wideman was initially credited with the first hat-trick in his career in a 4–2 victory over the Toronto Maple Leafs. The following day, however, the play was reviewed and his third goal was officially credited to teammate Brooks Laich, with Wideman receiving the primary assist. Despite the change, the game remained the first four-point performance of his career.

==== Calgary Flames ====
At the conclusion of the 2011–12 season, as a pending unrestricted free agent, Wideman's rights were traded to the Calgary Flames on June 27, 2012, in exchange for Jordan Henry and a fifth-round draft pick. Wideman was then immediately signed to a five-year, $26.25 million contract with the Flames. Wideman recorded six goals and 16 assists during the lockout-shortened 2012–13 season, his first with the Flames.

For the 2013-14 season, Wideman switched from jersey number 26 to 6, following the trade of Cory Sarich, who had previously worn the number, to the Colorado Avalanche. During the season, Wideman missed 36 games with various injuries, and saw his goal total drop two to 4 and his point total drop one to 21. The Flames also struggled, finishing in 27th place and missing the playoffs for the fifth year in a row.

Wideman started off slowly in 2014-15, and was made a healthy scratch by coach Bob Hartley in just the second game of the year; however, he quickly heated up and recorded a phenomenal season, setting career highs in goals, assists, and points. He finished tied for sixth among all defensemen in goals, with 15, and finished fourth in points by a defenseman, with 56. He formed a dynamic pairing with Kris Russell, and they helped lead the Flames back to the playoffs for the first time since 2009. Once there, Wideman led all Flames defenders in points, recording seven assists in eleven playoff games. In the opening round, Calgary dispatched the Vancouver Canucks in six games before falling in five to the Anaheim Ducks in the semi-finals.

Expected to continue his torrid pace into the 2015-16 season, Wideman instead struggled through the opening months of the year. He took 33 games to record his first goal, and only recorded one more for the duration of the season. 33 games into the previous season, Wideman had already recorded 9 goals. However, his poor play was overshadowed by a controversial play in January in which he violently collided with linesman Don Henderson, for which he was initially suspended twenty games. The incident made headlines internationally and a lawsuit filed by Henderson was dismissed. Upon returning from his suspension, Wideman promptly injured his triceps three games later in a game against the Winnipeg Jets on March 16, 2016, ending his season. Wideman failed to record a point in his last ten games of a disappointing, hectic year in which the Flames missed the playoffs.

Looking to put the previous season behind him, Wideman entered the 2016-17 season with something to prove. Entering the final year of his five-year deal, Wideman was to be an unrestricted free agent at the end of the season. Under new coach Glen Gulutzan, he began the year on a pairing with T.J. Brodie, but was quickly shuffled onto the third pairing in favour of fellow right-hand shot Deryk Engelland. Wideman struggled through the season, only posting five goals and 18 points through 57 games, before being benched for much of the latter part of the year after the Flames acquired Michael Stone from Arizona. The Flames qualified for the playoffs for the second time in three seasons, this time as the first Western Conference wildcard; however, Wideman did not play in any of the Flames' four playoff games.

==== Referee altercation ====
On January 27, 2016, Wideman struck linesman Don Henderson from behind in a game between the Flames and Nashville Predators. Video footage showed Wideman getting body checked along the boards by the Predators' Miikka Salomaki and getting up slowly. As he skated to the bench, he cross-checked the linesman across his back. Henderson was injured by the hit and left the game. Following the game, Wideman claimed the check was unintentional and that he did not see Henderson until the last moment. Henderson suffered a concussion as a result of the collision and would miss the remainder of the 2015–16 NHL season. It was later revealed that Wideman had also suffered a concussion on the Salomaki body check and refused treatment by the Flames' training staff, in violation of the NHL's mandatory head injury protocols.

Wideman was suspended indefinitely the next day, pending a hearing after the All-Star break. On February 3, he was handed a 20-game suspension without pay for the incident, the minimum sanction for deliberately striking an on-ice official under NHL Rule 40.2. Wideman also forfeited $564,516.18 in salary. While the NHL acknowledged that Wideman had been injured, it took the line that any possible disorientation Wideman suffered did not excuse the attack on Henderson.

The suspension was immediately appealed to NHL Commissioner Gary Bettman, who upheld the initial ruling, saying that a lengthy ban was merited given "the severity of the conduct involved." Bettman was also angered by Wideman's lack of remorse, citing a text Wideman sent to a teammate in which he blamed the furor over the hit on "the stupid refs and the stupid media." The National Hockey League Players' Association then appealed Wideman's suspension to a neutral arbitrator—the first time that this procedure had been used since the adoption of the renewed collective bargaining agreement. On March 11, arbitrator James Oldham concluded Wideman's attack on Henderson was not intentional and that he should have been penalized under Rule 40.3, thus reducing the penalty to 10 games. Wideman had already served 19 games at the time of the ruling but was refunded half of his forfeited salary.

On April 20, 2017, the CBC reported that Henderson was suing both Wideman and the Calgary Flames for CAD $10.25 million as a result of the injuries sustained from the hit. On March 2, 2018, the Court of Queen's Bench in Calgary dismissed the lawsuit, reasoning that the dispute should be settled through the NHL's arbitration process.

== Post-playing career ==
After the conclusion of the 2016–17 season, Wideman was an unsigned free agent over the summer and into the following 2017–18 season. On November 23, 2017, he concluded his professional playing career after 13 years by accepting an assistant coaching role with the major junior team Kitchener Rangers of the OHL.

== Career statistics ==
=== Regular season and playoffs ===
			Regular season					Playoffs
Season	Team	League	GP	G	A	Pts	PIM	GP	G	A	Pts	PIM
1997–98	Guelph Bantam AAA	SCTA	37	23	22	45	42	—	—	—	—	—
1998–99	Elmira Sugar Kings	MWJHL	47	18	40	48	62	—	—	—	—	—
1999–00	Sudbury Wolves	OHL	63	10	26	36	64	12	1	2	3	22
2000–01	Sudbury Wolves	OHL	25	7	11	18	37	—	—	—	—	—
2000–01	London Knights	OHL	24	8	8	16	38	5	0	4	4	6
2001–02	London Knights	OHL	65	27	42	69	141	12	4	9	13	26
2002–03	London Knights	OHL	55	20	27	47	83	14	6	6	12	10
2003–04	London Knights	OHL	60	24	41	65	85	15	7	10	17	17
2004–05	Worcester IceCats	AHL	79	13	30	43	65	—	—	—	—	—
2005–06	Peoria Rivermen	AHL	12	2	4	6	31	—	—	—	—	—
2005–06	St. Louis Blues	NHL	67	8	16	24	83	—	—	—	—	—
2006–07	St. Louis Blues	NHL	55	5	17	22	44	—	—	—	—	—
2006–07	Boston Bruins	NHL	20	1	2	3	27	—	—	—	—	—
2007–08	Boston Bruins	NHL	81	13	23	36	70	6	0	3	3	0
2008–09	Boston Bruins	NHL	79	13	37	50	34	11	0	7	7	4
2009–10	Boston Bruins	NHL	76	6	24	30	34	13	1	11	12	4
2010–11	Florida Panthers	NHL	61	9	24	33	33	—	—	—	—	—
2010–11	Washington Capitals	NHL	14	1	6	7	6	—	—	—	—	—
2011–12	Washington Capitals	NHL	82	11	35	46	46	14	0	3	3	2
2012–13	Calgary Flames	NHL	46	6	16	22	12	—	—	—	—	—
2013–14	Calgary Flames	NHL	46	4	17	21	18	—	—	—	—	—
2014–15	Calgary Flames	NHL	80	15	41	56	34	11	0	7	7	12
2015–16	Calgary Flames	NHL	51	2	17	19	30	—	—	—	—	—
2016–17	Calgary Flames	NHL	57	5	13	18	32	—	—	—	—	—
NHL totals			815	99	288	387	503	55	1	31	32	22

=== International ===
Year	Team	Event	GP	G	A	Pts	PIM
2000	Canada	U18	3	0	0	0	6
Junior totals			3	0	0	0	6

== See also ==
- 2015–16 NHL suspensions and fines
