= 2015–16 NHL suspensions and fines =

The following is a list of all suspensions and fines enforced in the National Hockey League (NHL) during the 2015–16 NHL season. It lists which players or coaches of what team have been punished for which offense and the amount of punishment they have received.

Based on each player's average annual salary, divided by number of days in the season (186) for first time offenders and games (82) for repeat offenders, salary will be forfeited for the term of their suspension. Players' money forfeited due to suspension or fine goes to the Players' Emergency Assistance Fund, while money forfeited by coaches, staff or organizations as a whole go to the NHL Foundation.

== Suspensions ==
^{‡} - suspension covered at least one 2016 post-season game

^{#} - Suspension was later reduced upon further review/successful appeal; information presented in italics

^{R} - Player was considered a repeat offender under the terms of the Collective Bargaining Agreement (player had been suspended in the 18 months prior to this suspension)

Date of Incident	Offender	Team(s)	Offense(s)	Date of Action	Length	Salary Forfeited^{1}
October 3, 2015	Raffi Torres	San Jose Sharks	Illegal check to the head of Jakob Silfverberg.	October 5, 2015	41 games	$440,860.29
October 4, 2015	Zack Kassian	Montreal Canadiens	Suspended indefinitely for violating the terms of the NHL/NHLPA Substance Abuse and Behavioral Health Program. ^{2}	October 5, 2015	31 games	$602,150.54
October 15, 2015	Nikita Nesterov	Tampa Bay Lightning	Boarding Curtis McKenzie.	October 16, 2015	2 games	$7,983.88
October 16, 2015	Tyson Barrie	Colorado Avalanche	Charging and interference against Simon Despres.	October 17, 2015	3 games	$41,935.47
October 22, 2015	Jason Demers	Dallas Stars	Elbowing Nick Bonino.	October 23, 2015	2 games	$36,559.14
October 31, 2015	Mark Stone	Ottawa Senators	Illegal check to the head of Landon Ferraro.	November 2, 2015	2 games	$37,634.40
November 12, 2015	Gabriel Landeskog	Colorado Avalanche	Illegal check to the head of Brad Marchand.	November 13, 2015	2 games	$59,907.84
November 27, 2015	Brandon Dubinsky	Columbus Blue Jackets	Cross-checking Sidney Crosby.	November 28, 2015	1 game	$31,451.61
December 1, 2015	Radko Gudas	Philadelphia Flyers	Illegal check to the head of Mika Zibanejad.	December 2, 2015	3 games	$15,994.62
December 11, 2015	Nate Thompson	Anaheim Ducks	Illegal check to the head of Justin Faulk.	December 14, 2015	3 games	$25,806.45
December 20, 2015	Max Talbot	Boston Bruins	Interference against Jiri Tlusty.	December 21, 2015	2 games	$19,354.84
December 29, 2015	Brad Marchand	Boston Bruins	Clipping Mark Borowiecki.	December 30, 2015	3 games	$164,634.15
January 5, 2016	Zach Sill	Washington Capitals	Boarding Adam McQuaid.	January 6, 2016	2 games	$6,182.80
January 7, 2016	Marcus Johansson	Washington Capitals	Illegal check to the head of Thomas Hickey.	January 8, 2016	2 games	$40,322.58
January 10, 2016	Matt Hendricks	Edmonton Oilers	Boarding Aaron Ekblad.	January 11, 2016	3 games	$29,838.72
January 12, 2016	Bobby Farnham	New Jersey Devils	Interference against Dmitrij Jaskin.	January 13, 2016	4 games	$12,365.60
January 23, 2016	Milan Lucic	Los Angeles Kings	Roughing Kevin Connauton.	January 24, 2016	1 game	$32,258.06
January 26, 2016	Shawn Horcoff	Anaheim Ducks	Violating the terms of the NHL/NHLPA Performance Enhancing Substances Program. ^{3}	January 26, 2016	20 games	$366,935.48
January 27, 2016	Dennis Wideman	Calgary Flames	Physical abuse of official Don Henderson.	February 3, 2016; March 11, 2016	20 games^{#} 10 games ^{4}	$564,516.20 $282,258.10
January 31, 2016	Alex Ovechkin	Washington Capitals	Automatic suspension for missing NHL All-Star Game.	January 28, 2016	1 game	N/A
January 31, 2016	Jonathan Toews	Chicago Blackhawks	Automatic suspension for missing NHL All-Star Game.	January 28, 2016	1 game	N/A
February 6, 2016	Drew Stafford	Winnipeg Jets	High-sticking Nick Holden.	February 8, 2016	1 game	$23,387.10
February 18, 2016	Leo Komarov	Toronto Maple Leafs	Elbowing Ryan McDonagh.	February 19, 2016	3 games	$47,580.66
February 22, 2016	Ryan Reaves	St. Louis Blues	Boarding Matt Tennyson.	February 24, 2016	3 games	$18,145.17
February 28, 2016	Zac Rinaldo	Boston Bruins	Illegal check to the head of Cedric Paquette.	March 1, 2016	5 games	$51,829.25
March 3, 2016	Max Domi	Arizona Coyotes	Automatic suspension for instigating a fight during the final five minutes of a game.	March 4, 2016	1 game	$4,641.58
March 8, 2016	Darnell Nurse	Edmonton Oilers	Aggressing Roman Polak.	March 10, 2016	3 games	$13,924.74
March 9, 2016	Jarred Tinordi	Arizona Coyotes	Violating the terms of the NHL/NHLPA Performance Enhancing Substances Program. ^{5}	March 9, 2016	20 games	$207,439.02
March 9, 2016	Gabriel Landeskog	Colorado Avalanche	Cross-checking Simon Despres.	March 10, 2016	3 games	$203,832.75
March 13, 2016	Dalton Prout	Columbus Blue Jackets	Punching an unsuspecting Nikita Kucherov.	March 15, 2016	1 game	$5,779.57
March 16, 2016	Chris VandeVelde	Philadelphia Flyers	Elbowing Jonathan Toews.	March 18, 2016	2 games	$7,661.30
March 22, 2016	Jared Boll	Columbus Blue Jackets	Interference against Pierre-Edouard Bellemare.	March 24, 2016	4 games	$82,926.84
March 29, 2016	Jake Virtanen	Vancouver Canucks	Interference against Roman Polak.	March 30, 2016	2 games	$9,614.70
March 29, 2016	Duncan Keith	Chicago Blackhawks	High-sticking Charlie Coyle.	April 1, 2016	6 games^{‡} (5 regular season + 1 post-season)	$148,883.35
April 2, 2016	Nazem Kadri	Toronto Maple Leafs	Cross-checking Luke Glendening.	April 4, 2016	4 games	$200,000.00
April 18, 2016	Pierre-Edouard Bellemare	Philadelphia Flyers	Checking Dmitry Orlov from behind.	April 19, 2016	1 game^{‡}	N/A
April 19, 2016	Andrew Shaw	Chicago Blackhawks	Using a homophobic slur towards an official. ^{6}	April 20, 2016	1 game^{‡}	N/A
April 24, 2016	Brayden Schenn	Philadelphia Flyers	Charging T.J. Oshie.	April 26, 2016	3 games^{7}	N/A
April 30, 2016	Brooks Orpik	Washington Capitals	Interference against Olli Maatta.	May 1, 2016	3 games^{‡}	N/A
May 2, 2016	Kris Letang	Pittsburgh Penguins	Interference against Marcus Johansson.	May 3, 2016	1 game^{‡}	N/A
Player totals:					203 games^{‡} (196 regular season + 7 post-season)	$3,234,519.72

1. All figures are in US dollars.
2. Suspension accompanied by mandatory referral to the NHL/NHLPA Program for Substance Abuse and Behavioral Health - Stage 2. Suspension completed only upon being cleared for on-ice competition by the program administrators. Kassian was reinstated by the NHL on December 15, 2015 after missing 31 games.
3. Suspension accompanied by mandatory referral to the NHL/NHLPA Program for Substance Abuse and Behavioral Health.
4. Wideman's original suspension was for 20 games. Suspension was appealed by Wideman and the NHLPA on February 3, 2016. On February 17, 2016, NHL Commissioner Gary Bettman announced he had heard the appeal and was upholding the original 20 game suspension levied to Wideman. The NHLPA then appealed to neutral arbitrator. On March 11, 2016, NHL/NHLPA Neutral Discipline Arbitrator, James Oldham, overruled the NHL and Bettman's 20 game suspension down to 10 games. Though Wideman had already missed 19 of his originally assessed 20 games before Oldham's decision was made, his suspension will stand as 10 games in the NHL records and his salary was refunded for the 9 games he missed.
5. Suspension accompanied by mandatory referral to the NHL/NHLPA Program for Substance Abuse and Behavioral Health. Only sixteen games remained in the Arizona Coyotes season at the time of the suspension, so the remaining four games were served at the start of the 2016–17 NHL season; as he was mid-suspension, Tinordi was also barred from playing in any 2016 preseason games.
6. Suspension accompanied by mandatory referral to sensitivity training, as a well as an additional fine (see below) as there is no salary to be forfeited in a playoff game.
7. As the Philadelphia Flyers were eliminated from the playoffs, Schenn's suspension was instead made to be served in his first three games of the 2016–17 NHL regular season.

== Fines ==
Players can be fined up to 50% of one day's salary, up to a maximum of $10,000.00 for their first offense, and $15,000.00 for any subsequent offenses. Fines listed in italics indicate that was the maximum allowed fine.

Coaches, non-playing personnel, and teams are not restricted to such maximums.

Fines for players/coaches fined for diving/embellishment are structured uniquely and are only handed out after non-publicized warnings are given to the player/coach for their first offense. For more details on diving/embellishment fines:

Diving/embellishment specifications
Incident Number^{1}	Player Fine^{2}	Coach Fine^{2}
1	Warning (N/A)	Warning (N/A)
2	$2,000	N/A
3	$3,000	N/A
4	$4,000	N/A
5	$5,000	$2,000
6	$5,000	$3,000
7	$5,000	$4,000
8+	$5,000	$5,000

1. For coach incident totals, each citation issued to a player on his club counts toward his total.
2. All figures are in US dollars.

Date of Incident	Offender	Team	Offense	Date of Action	Amount^{1}
October 13, 2015	Jordin Tootoo	New Jersey Devils	Tripping Seth Jones.	October 15, 2015	$2,217.74
October 22, 2015	Stephen Gionta	New Jersey Devils	Spearing Mark Borowiecki.	October 23, 2015	$2,284.95
October 25, 2015	Alexander Burmistrov	Winnipeg Jets	Elbowing Jared Spurgeon.	October 26, 2015	$4,166.67
November 3, 2015	Ryan Reaves	St. Louis Blues	Roughing Anze Kopitar.	November 4, 2015	$3,024.19
November 8, 2015	Teemu Pulkkinen	Detroit Red Wings	Diving/Embellishment (second citation).	November 13, 2015	$2,000.00
November 12, 2015	Brad Marchand	Boston Bruins	Roughing Gabriel Landeskog.	November 13, 2015	$5,000.00
December 5, 2015	Brandon Prust	Vancouver Canucks	Spearing Brad Marchand.	December 6, 2015	$5,000.00
December 10, 2015	Zack Smith	Ottawa Senators	Diving/Embellishment (second citation).	December 17, 2015	$2,000.00
December 22, 2015	Jannik Hansen	Vancouver Canucks	Diving/Embellishment (second citation).	January 1, 2016	$2,000.00
December 29, 2015	Nikolaj Ehlers	Winnipeg Jets	Diving/Embellishment (second citation).	January 7, 2016	$2,000.00
December 30, 2015	Bobby Farnham	New Jersey Devils	Diving/Embellishment (second citation).	January 7, 2016	$2,000.00
January 4, 2016	Jordin Tootoo	New Jersey Devils	Diving/Embellishment (second citation).	January 14, 2016	$2,000.00
January 12, 2016	Tyler Myers	Winnipeg Jets	Cross-checking Tommy Wingels.	January 13, 2016	$5,000.00
January 26, 2016	Alexander Burmistrov	Winnipeg Jets	Diving/Embellishment (second citation).	February 4, 2016	$2,000.00
February 9, 2016	Nazem Kadri	Toronto Maple Leafs	Inappropriate gesture towards Mark Giordano.	February 11, 2016	$5,000.00
March 6, 2016	Tuomo Ruutu	New Jersey Devils	Slew-footing Matt Cullen.	March 9, 2016	$5,000.00
March 12, 2016	Martin Hanzal	Arizona Coyotes	Diving/Embellishment (second citation).	April 1, 2016	$2,000.00
March 12, 2016	Nazem Kadri	Toronto Maple Leafs	Diving/Embellishment (second citation).	April 1, 2016	$2,000.00
March 12, 2016	Nail Yakupov	Edmonton Oilers	Diving/Embellishment (second citation).	April 1, 2016	$2,000.00
March 21, 2016	Nazem Kadri	Toronto Maple Leafs	Diving/Embellishment (third citation).	April 1, 2016	$3,000.00
March 24, 2016	Josh Manson	Anaheim Ducks	Inappropriate gesture towards Nazem Kadri.	March 25, 2016	$2,486.56
March 30, 2016	Jason Chimera	Washington Capitals	Butt-ending Shayne Gostisbehere.	March 31, 2016	$5,000.00
April 19, 2016	Andrew Shaw	Chicago Blackhawks	Inappropriate gesture towards an official.^{2}	April 20, 2016	$5,000.00
April 28, 2016	Tom Wilson	Washington Capitals	Kneeing Conor Sheary.	April 29, 2016	$2,403.67
June 23, 2016	Team	Vancouver Canucks	Inappropriate public comments (tampering) by speaking generally to the Club's potential interest in players under contract to other NHL Clubs, following Jim Benning's comments on P.K. Subban and Steven Stamkos.	June 28, 2016	$50,000.00
Player totals:					$124,583.78

1. All figures are in US dollars.
2. Fine accompanied by mandatory referral to sensitivity training, as a well as an additional suspension (see above) as there is no salary to be forfeited in a playoff game.

== See also ==
- 2014–15 NHL suspensions and fines
- 2016–17 NHL suspensions and fines
- 2015 in sports
- 2016 in sports
- 2015 NHL entry draft
- 2015–16 NHL season
- 2015–16 NHL transactions
- 2015–16 NHL Three Star Awards
