= 2016–17 NHL suspensions and fines =

The following is a list of all suspensions and fines enforced in the National Hockey League (NHL) during the 2016–17 NHL season. It lists which players or coaches of what team have been punished for which offense and the amount of punishment they have received.

Based on each player's average annual salary, divided by number of days in the season (180) for first time offenders and games (82) for repeat offenders, salary will be forfeited for the term of their suspension. Players' money forfeited due to suspension or fine goes to the Players' Emergency Assistance Fund, while money forfeited by coaches, staff or organizations as a whole go to the NHL Foundation.

== Suspensions ==
^{*} - suspension carried over from 2015–16 season

^{†} - suspension covered at least one 2016 NHL preseason game

^{‡} - suspension covered at least one 2017 postseason game

^{R} - Player was considered a repeat offender under the terms of the Collective Bargaining Agreement (player had been suspended in the 18 months prior to this suspension)

Date of Incident	Offender	Team(s)	Offense(s)	Date of Action	Length	Salary Forfeited^{1}
March 9, 2016	Jarred Tinordi	Arizona Coyotes	Violating the terms of the NHL/NHLPA Performance Enhancing Substances Program.^{2}	March 9, 2016	28 games^{*†2} (16 2015–16 regular season + 8 preseason + 4 2016–17 regular season)	$161,878.14
April 24, 2016	Brayden Schenn	Philadelphia Flyers	Charging T.J. Oshie.	April 26, 2016	3 games^{*3}	N/A
September 27, 2016	Andrew Shaw	Montreal Canadiens	Boarding Connor Hobbs.	September 29, 2016	3 games^{†} (3 preseason)	N/A
October 1, 2016	Niklas Hjalmarsson	Chicago Blackhawks	Charging Ty Rattie.	October 3, 2016	3 games^{†} (2 preseason + 1 regular season)	$22,777.78
October 2, 2016	Tanner Pearson	Los Angeles Kings	Illegal check to the head of Brandon Davidson.	October 5, 2016	4 games^{†} (2 preseason + 2 regular season)	$15,555.56
October 8, 2016	Radko Gudas^{R}	Philadelphia Flyers	Interference against Austin Czarnik.	October 10, 2016	6 games	$245,121.96
October 20, 2016	Dale Weise	Philadelphia Flyers	Illegal check to the head of Korbinian Holzer.	October 21, 2016	3 games	$39,166.68
October 26, 2016	David Pastrnak	Boston Bruins	Illegal check to the head of Dan Girardi.	October 28, 2016	2 games	$10,277.78
November 1, 2016	Tom Gilbert	Los Angeles Kings	Boarding Nick Ritchie.	November 3, 2016	3 games	$23,333.34
December 10, 2016	Jamie Oleksiak	Dallas Stars	Illegal check to the head of Chris VandeVelde.	December 11, 2016	2 games	$10,208.34
December 10, 2016	Mark Borowiecki	Ottawa Senators	Boarding Tyler Toffoli.	December 11, 2016	2 games	$12,222.22
December 14, 2016	Mike Hoffman	Ottawa Senators	Cross-checking Logan Couture.	December 16, 2016	2 games	$57,638.88
December 15, 2016	Cody Eakin	Dallas Stars	Charging Henrik Lundqvist.	December 16, 2016	4 games	$85,555.56
December 31, 2016	Tony DeAngelo	Arizona Coyotes	Physical abuse of an official. (Physically opposing Linesman David Brisebois while Briesbois was restraining DeAngelo during an altercation)	January 1, 2017	3 games	$14,388.90
February 12, 2017	Gustav Nyquist	Detroit Red Wings	High-sticking Jared Spurgeon.	February 15, 2017	6 games	$158,333.34
February 14, 2017	Antoine Vermette	Anaheim Ducks	Physical abuse of an official. (Slashing Linesman Shandor Alphonso)	February 16, 2017	10 games^{4}	$97,222.22
February 19, 2017	Jacob Trouba	Winnipeg Jets	Illegal check to the head of Mark Stone.	February 20, 2017	2 games	$33,333.34
February 25, 2017	Brandon Manning	Philadelphia Flyers	Interference against Jake Guentzel.	February 27, 2017	2 games	$10,833.34
March 8, 2017	Tom Sestito	Pittsburgh Penguins	Boarding Tobias Enstrom.	March 9, 2017	4 games	$12,777.76
March 11, 2017	Kevin Shattenkirk	Washington Capitals	Charging Kevin Gravel.	March 12, 2017	2 games	$47,222.22
March 19, 2017	Matthew Tkachuk	Calgary Flames	Elbowing Drew Doughty.	March 20, 2017	2 games	$10,277.78
March 21, 2017	Rasmus Ristolainen	Buffalo Sabres	Interference against Jake Guentzel.	March 23, 2017	3 games	$90,000.00
March 22, 2017	Roman Polak	Toronto Maple Leafs	Boarding Oliver Bjorkstrand.	March 23, 2017	2 games	$25,000.00
March 25, 2017	Micheal Haley	San Jose Sharks	Roughing Calle Jarnkrok.	March 27, 2017	1 game	$3,472.22
April 1, 2017	Dalton Prout^{R}	New Jersey Devils	Interference against Radko Gudas.	April 3, 2017	2 games	$38,414.64
April 4, 2017	Brad Marchand^{R}	Boston Bruins	Spearing Jake Dotchin.	April 6, 2017	2 games	$109,756.10
April 6, 2017	Nick Ritchie	Anaheim Ducks	Roughing Michal Rozsival.	April 7, 2017	2 games^{‡} (1 regular season + 1 postseason)	$4,967.59
April 14, 2017	Matt Calvert	Columbus Blue Jackets	Cross-checking Tom Kuhnhackl.	April 15, 2017	1 game^{‡} (1 postseason)	N/A
Player totals:					93 games^{†‡} (15 preseason + 76 regular season + 2 postseason)	$1,132,296.67^{5}

1. All figures are in US dollars.
2. Suspension accompanied by mandatory referral to the NHL/NHLPA Program for Substance Abuse and Behavioral Health. Only sixteen games remained in the Arizona Coyotes season at the time of the suspension, so the remaining four games were served at the start of the 2016–17 NHL season; as he was mid-suspension, Tinordi was also barred from playing in any preseason games.
3. As the Philadelphia Flyers were eliminated from the playoffs, Schenn's suspension was instead made to be served in his first three games of the 2016–17 NHL regular season.
4. Suspension was appealed by Vermette and the NHLPA on February 16, 2017. On February 25, 2017, NHL Commissioner Gary Bettman announced he had heard the appeal and was upholding the original 10-game suspension levied to Vermette.
5. This figures does not include salary forfeited for Tinordi's suspension, as that was accounted for last season.

== Fines ==
Players can be fined up to 50% of one day's salary, up to a maximum of $10,000.00 for their first offense, and $15,000.00 for any subsequent offenses. Fines listed in italics indicate that was the maximum allowed fine.

Coaches, non-playing personnel, and teams are not restricted to such maximums.

Fines for players/coaches fined for diving/embellishment are structured uniquely and are only handed out after non-publicized warnings are given to the player/coach for their first offense. For more details on diving/embellishment fines:

Diving/embellishment specifications
Incident Number^{1}	Player Fine^{2}	Coach Fine^{2}
1	Warning (N/A)	Warning (N/A)
2	$2,000	N/A
3	$3,000	N/A
4	$4,000	N/A
5	$5,000	$2,000
6	$5,000	$3,000
7	$5,000	$4,000
8+	$5,000	$5,000

1. For coach incident totals, each citation issued to a player on his club counts toward his total.
2. All figures are in US dollars.

Date of Incident	Offender	Team	Offense	Date of Action	Amount^{1}
October 29, 2016	Steve Ott	Detroit Red Wings	Spearing Zdeno Chara.	October 30, 2016	$2,222.22
November 3, 2016	Oliver Ekman-Larsson	Arizona Coyotes	Diving/Embellishment (second citation).	November 10, 2016	$2,000.00
December 14, 2016	Marc-Edouard Vlasic	San Jose Sharks	Dangerous use of the stick.	December 16, 2016	$5,000.00
December 29, 2016	Evgeny Kuznetsov	Washington Capitals	Diving/Embellishment (second citation).	January 5, 2017	$2,000.00
January 17, 2017	Chris Kreider	New York Rangers	Hitting Cody Eakin with his helmet during a fight.	January 18, 2017	$5,000.00
January 21, 2017	Peter Holland	Arizona Coyotes	Punching an unsuspecting Ondrej Palat.	January 24, 2017	$3,611.11
January 24, 2017	Brad Marchand	Boston Bruins	Dangerous trip against Niklas Kronwall.	January 26, 2017	$10,000.00
January 31, 2017	Keith Yandle	Florida Panthers	Diving/Embellishment (second citation).	February 9, 2017	$2,000.00
March 4, 2017	Jake Muzzin	Los Angeles Kings	Diving/Embellishment (second citation).	March 10, 2017	$2,000.00
March 5, 2017	Johnny Gaudreau	Calgary Flames	Diving/Embellishment (second citation).	March 10, 2017	$2,000.00
April 18, 2017	Leon Draisaitl	Edmonton Oilers	Spearing Chris Tierney.	April 19, 2017	$2,569.44
May 2, 2017	P.K. Subban	Nashville Predators	Diving/Embellishment (second citation).	May 10, 2017	$2,000.00
May 18, 2017	Ryan Getzlaf	Anaheim Ducks	Inappropriate remark towards an official. (Referee Kelly Sutherland)	May 20, 2017	$10,000.00
Player totals:					$50,402.77

1. All figures are in US dollars.

== See also ==
- 2015–16 NHL suspensions and fines
- 2017–18 NHL suspensions and fines
- 2016 in sports
- 2017 in sports
- 2016–17 NHL season
- 2016–17 NHL transactions
