= Don Henderson (linesman) =

Canadian ice hockey official

- Born: September 23, 1968 (age 56); Calgary, Alberta, Canada
- Occupation: Ice hockey official

Don Henderson (born September 23, 1968) is a former Canadian National Hockey League linesman, who wears uniform number #91. He began officiating NHL games in 1994 and has worked more than 1,300 games including the Stanley Cup Playoffs. He is the younger brother of Archie Henderson.

Henderson has not officiated since sustaining a concussion after a check from Calgary Flames player Dennis Wideman in a game on January 27, 2016. Despite the injury, Henderson was able to finish the game, but developed concussion symptoms and back and neck pain in the following days. Wideman was initially suspended for 20 games by the league for deliberate physical abuse of an official, but an independent arbitrator concluded the check to be unintentional and reduced the suspension to 10 games.

On April 20, 2017, the CBC reported that Henderson was suing both Wideman and the Calgary Flames for CA$10.25 million as a result of the alleged injuries sustained from the hit. A judge dismissed the lawsuit, referring the case to an NHL arbitrator, and ordered Henderson to pay partial legal costs of $8,000 to the Flames and $3,000 to Wideman.
