= Archie Henderson =

Canadian ice hockey player (born 1957)

- Born: February 17, 1957 (age 69) Calgary, Alberta, Canada
- Height: 6 ft 6 in (198 cm)
- Weight: 220 lb (100 kg; 15 st 10 lb)
- Position: Right wing
- Shot: Right
- Played for: Washington Capitals; Minnesota North Stars; Hartford Whalers
- NHL draft: 156th overall, 1977; Washington Capitals
- Playing career: 1977–1988

Archie Robert Henderson (born February 17, 1957) is a Canadian former professional ice hockey player. He played 23 games in the National Hockey League for the Washington Capitals, Minnesota North Stars, and Hartford Whalers between 1980 and 1982. The rest of his career, which lasted from 1977 to 1988, was spent in different minor leagues. He was selected by the Capitals in the 1977 NHL entry draft. He is the older brother of Don Henderson. Standing 6' 6", Henderson was one of the tallest NHL players of his time, at a time when players over 6' 4" were a rarity.

Henderson is most noted as a player for his time with the Port Huron Flags when he got a broken nose, eight stitches to the forehead and a slight concussion from the Dayton Owls' Willie Trognitz at the conclusion of a match-ending, bench-clearing brawl at the McMorran Place ice arena on October 29, 1977. The result was Trognitz being banned for life by the International Hockey League (IHL) five days later on November 3.

Henderson is currently the director of pro scouting with the Edmonton Oilers.

== Career statistics ==
=== Regular season and playoffs ===
			Regular season					Playoffs
Season	Team	League	GP	G	A	Pts	PIM	GP	G	A	Pts	PIM
1973–74	Calgary Royals	AAHA	—	—	—	—	—	—	—	—	—	—
1973–74	Calgary Canucks	AJHL	2	0	6	6	—	—	—	—	—	—
1974–75	Lethbridge Broncos	WCHL	65	3	10	13	177	8	0	0	0	22
1975–76	Lethbridge Broncos	WCHL	21	1	2	3	110	—	—	—	—	—
1975–76	Victoria Cougars	WCHL	31	8	7	15	205	14	1	2	3	35
1976–77	Victoria Cougars	WCHL	47	14	10	24	208	3	1	0	1	29
1977–78	Port Huron Flags	IHL	71	16	16	32	419	15	5	4	9	47
1978–79	Hershey Bears	AHL	78	17	11	28	337	4	0	1	1	28
1979–80	Hershey Bears	AHL	8	0	2	2	37	—	—	—	—	—
1979–80	Fort Worth Texans	CHL	49	8	9	17	199	12	2	1	3	58
1980–81	Hershey Bears	AHL	60	3	5	8	251	5	0	0	0	6
1980–81	Washington Capitals	NHL	7	1	0	1	28	—	—	—	—	—
1981–82	Nashville South Stars	CHL	77	12	23	35	320	3	0	0	0	17
1981–82	Minnesota North Stars	NHL	1	0	0	0	0	—	—	—	—	—
1982–83	Binghamton Whalers	AHL	50	8	9	17	172	—	—	—	—	—
1982–83	Hartford Whalers	NHL	15	2	1	3	64	—	—	—	—	—
1983–84	New Haven Nighthawks	AHL	48	1	8	9	164	—	—	—	—	—
1984–85	Nova Scotia Oilers	AHL	71	5	7	12	271	5	0	0	0	30
1985–86	Maine Mariners	AHL	57	4	6	10	172	5	0	0	0	24
1986–87	Maine Mariners	AHL	67	4	6	10	246	—	—	—	—	—
1987–88	Saginaw Hawks	IHL	55	4	9	13	231	10	0	0	0	66
AHL totals			439	42	54	96	1650	19	0	1	1	88
NHL totals			23	3	1	4	92	—	—	—	—	—
