= Willie Trognitz =

Canadian ice hockey player

- Born: June 11, 1953 (age 73) Thunder Bay, Ontario, Canada
- Height: 6 ft 0 in (183 cm)
- Weight: 205 lb (93 kg; 14 st 9 lb)
- Position: Left wing
- Shot: Left
- Played for: Cincinnati Stingers
- NHL draft: 82nd overall, 1973; California Golden Seals
- Playing career: 1973–1980

Raymond William Trognitz (born June 11, 1953) is a Canadian former professional ice hockey player who played in the World Hockey Association (WHA). Trognitz played part of the 1977–78 WHA season with the Cincinnati Stingers. He was drafted in the sixth round of the 1973 NHL Amateur Draft by the California Golden Seals.

== Playing career ==
Trognitz is most noted for signing with the Stingers on November 7, 1977, just four days after the International Hockey League (IHL) had banned him for life for the damage he inflicted on the Port Huron Flags' Archie Henderson while a member of the Dayton Owls after a match-ending, bench-clearing brawl at the McMorran Place ice arena nine days prior on October 29. He had first come to the defense of teammate John Flesch by jumping Henderson from behind and breaking his nose with one of his punches. When Henderson later charged him looking for a fight, Trognitz swung his stick and cut him across the forehead. He accumulated 63 minutes in penalties, while Henderson ended up with a broken nose, eight stitches to the forehead, a slight concussion and an overnight stay at a Port Huron hospital. Needing an enforcer to protect its younger, skilled players, the Stingers signed Trognitz to a contract in which he was paid $150 for each of ten games. He dressed for all ten, played in seven, and picked up 37 penalty minutes, which included 25 in one contest against the Quebec Nordiques. He was offered another ten-game contract but rejected it, saying, "What's $150? I got guys making $150,000 hiding behind my back."

After his playing days ended, he joined the Canadian Coast Guard. For his help in the at-sea rescue of the cruise ship Grampa Woo, he and two other crew members were awarded the Governor General's Medal of Bravery.

== Career statistics ==
=== Regular season and playoffs ===
			Regular season					Playoffs
Season	Team	League	GP	G	A	Pts	PIM	GP	G	A	Pts	PIM
1971–72	Thunder Bay Vulcans	MNTBHL	Statistics Unavailable
1973–74	Charlotte Checkers	SHL	48	5	5	10	140	––	––	––	––	––
1974–75	Toledo Goaldiggers	IHL	69	4	12	16	305	19	3	6	9	70
1975–76	Toledo Goaldiggers	IHL	44	6	10	16	128	––	––	––	––	––
1975–76	Columbus Owls	IHL	24	8	15	23	81	––	––	––	––	––
1976–77	Columbus Owls	IHL	71	21	13	34	232	6	0	1	1	42
1977–78	Dayton/Grand Rapids Owls	IHL	5	1	0	1	81	––	––	––	––	––
1977–78	Cincinnati Stingers	WHA	29	2	1	3	94	––	––	––	––	––
1978–79	Tucson Rustlers	PHL	44	8	8	16	25
1979–80	Fort Worth Texans	CHL	55	4	8	12	203	3	1	1	2	0
WHA totals			29	2	1	3	94	—	—	—	—	—
