= 2015–16 NHL season =

National Hockey League season

- League: National Hockey League
- Sport: Ice hockey
- Duration: October 7, 2015 – June 12, 2016
- Games: 82
- Teams: 30
- TV partner(s): CBC, Sportsnet/SN1/SN360, Citytv, FX, TVA Sports (Canada); NBCSN, NBC, CNBC, USA (United States)

Draft
- Top draft pick: Connor McDavid
- Picked by: Edmonton Oilers

Regular season
- Presidents' Trophy: Washington Capitals
- Season MVP: Patrick Kane (Blackhawks)
- Top scorer: Patrick Kane (Blackhawks)

Playoffs
- Playoffs MVP: Sidney Crosby (Penguins)

Stanley Cup
- Champions: Pittsburgh Penguins
- Runners-up: San Jose Sharks

NHL seasons
- 2014–15 2016–17

The 2015–16 NHL season was the 99th season of operation (98th season of play) of the National Hockey League (NHL). Thirty teams competed in 82-game regular season schedules from October 7, 2015 to April 10, 2016.

The 2016 Stanley Cup playoffs following the regular season began on April 13 and ended June 12, with the Pittsburgh Penguins defeating the San Jose Sharks in six games to win their fourth Stanley Cup. None of the seven Canadian-based teams qualified for the playoffs; this was the second season in league history that the playoff field consisted of only United States-based teams. The only other time in league history that no Canadian teams qualified for the postseason was in the 1969–70 season.

== League business ==
=== Salary cap ===
In December 2014, commissioner Gary Bettman told teams that he projected the salary cap to increase to at least US$73 million for the 2015–16 season, citing the fluctuating value of the Canadian dollar. The cap was ultimately set at US$71.4 million.

=== Rule changes ===
Rule changes approved by the NHL Board of Governors on June 24, 2015, include:

- 3-on-3 overtime: Overtime during the regular season will now have three skaters per side, instead of the 4-on-4 overtime system that had been used since 1999–2000. However, if there are carry-over penalties from the third period to overtime, a side is still guaranteed to have at least three skaters and the man-advantage will be adjusted accordingly (e.g. a 5-on-4 power play at the end of regulation will be converted to a 4-on-3 one at the start of overtime). The Board of Governors implemented 3-on-3 overtime to help decrease shootouts. Jason Garrison of the Tampa Bay Lightning scored the first 3-on-3 overtime goal on October 9, 2015 for a 3-2 victory over the Philadelphia Flyers.
- Expanded video review with coach's challenge: Video review has been expanded to include a coach's challenge, similar to the system used by the NFL since 1999:
  - Like the NFL, each challenge will require the use of a team's timeout. If the challenge is successful, the timeout is restored.
  - Teams may only challenge the following situations:
    - Whether a goal called on the ice should have been disallowed because the attacking team was offside or interfered with the goaltender;
    - Whether a disallowed goal, called on grounds of goalkeeper interference, should instead be overturned because either:
      - there was no actual contact between the attacking player and the goalie
      - the attacking player was actually pushed or fouled by a defender into the goalie
      - the attacking player's position in the crease did not actually impair or impact the goalie's play
  - Inside the final minute of regulation, and during overtime, all reviews that would otherwise be subject to the coach's challenge will instead be initiated by the NHL's Situation Room in Toronto.
  - All reviews that are subject to the coach's challenge will be conducted by the on-ice officials on an ice-level tablet monitor instead of the Situation Room.
  - All reviews involving whether the puck entered the net will still be initiated by the Situation Room.
- New faceoff rule: During faceoffs not at center-ice, the player who is on the defensive side of the red line will now be required to put his stick down first. For faceoffs at the center-ice dot, the visiting player will still be the first one to place down his stick. This rule change, giving the attacking team a slight advantage during faceoffs (as opposed to giving this advantage to the home team all the time), is intended to help increase puck-possession time and potentially more goals.

=== Entry draft ===
The 2015 NHL entry draft was held on June 26–27, 2015, at the BB&T Center in Sunrise, Florida. Connor McDavid was selected first overall by the Edmonton Oilers.

=== Expansion bids ===
For the second time since 2000, the league ended a moratorium on potential expansion teams and began accepting bids for potential expansion teams that, if approved, would begin play in the 2017–18 season. During the 2015 offseason, two ownership groups offered bids: Quebecor, which planned on reviving the Quebec Nordiques at a new arena in Quebec City, Quebec, and Bill Foley's Black Knight Sports & Entertainment, which intended to place an expansion team at a new arena in Las Vegas, Nevada. The league concluded the vetting process on September 4, 2015, with a final decision to follow in June 2016.

=== Change in jersey supplier ===
On September 15, 2015, the NHL announced that Adidas would replace Reebok as the supplier of all team jerseys beginning in the 2017–18 season.

== Coaching changes ==
Coaching changes
Offseason
Team	2014–15 coach	2015–16 coach	Story / accomplishments
Buffalo Sabres	Ted Nolan	Dan Bylsma	Nolan was fired on April 12, 2015. In his second stint with the club, he compiled a record of 40–87–17 over the course of 1¾ seasons, both of which ended with the team in last place in the league. On May 28, Bylsma succeeded after serving on the Pittsburgh Penguins from 2009 to 2014.
Detroit Red Wings	Mike Babcock	Jeff Blashill	Babcock's contract with the Red Wings was to expire July 1, 2015; the Red Wings granted his request to pursue employment elsewhere on May 8, after failing to come to terms on a contract. In ten seasons with the Red Wings, Babcock accumulated a record of 458–223–15, made the playoffs every year, and won the Stanley Cup in 2008. Babcock was highly sought after on the open market, and on May 20, 2015, after several teams courted him, Babcock signed with the Toronto Maple Leafs. The Red Wings promoted Jeff Blashill, who coached the Red Wings' minor league affiliate the Grand Rapids Griffins. Once the Griffins completed their playoff run, the Red Wings retained Blashill's rights and did not allow any NHL team to interview him for openings.
Edmonton Oilers	Dallas Eakins, Todd Nelson*	Todd McLellan	Eakins, in 1½ seasons with the Oilers, compiled a record of 36–63–14 and was fired on December 15, 2014. Nelson completed the season with a record of 17–25–9, failing to reach the playoffs. On May 19, McLellan succeeded after serving seven seasons as a head coach with the San Jose Sharks.
New Jersey Devils	Peter DeBoer, Scott Stevens*, Adam Oates*	John Hynes	DeBoer, in 3½ seasons with the Devils, compiled a record of 114–93–41 before being fired on December 26, 2014. The Devils used interim head coaches Scott Stevens and Adam Oates for the remainder of the season. DeBoer joined the San Jose Sharks. On June 2, 2015, Hynes succeeds after serving on the Wilkes-Barre/Scranton Penguins of the American Hockey League as a head coach from 2009 to 2010. With this hiring, he became the youngest coach in the NHL at the age of 40.
Philadelphia Flyers	Craig Berube	Dave Hakstol	Berube was fired on April 17, 2015, after accumulating a record of 75–58–28 in two seasons. In his first season, he took the Flyers to the playoffs, where they lost in the First Round. The team missed the playoffs in Berube's second season at the helm. Hakstol, whom the Flyers hired on May 18, 2015, had been head coach of the University of North Dakota men's ice hockey team for the previous eleven years.
San Jose Sharks	Todd McLellan	Peter DeBoer	McLellan was San Jose's most successful coach to date and compiled a regular season record of 311–163–66 over seven seasons. However, the San Jose Sharks and Todd McLellan mutually agreed to part ways on April 20, 2015, after failing to make the playoffs for the first time in his tenure. On May 28, 2015, the Sharks announced that they had hired Peter DeBoer.
Toronto Maple Leafs	Randy Carlyle, Peter Horachek*	Mike Babcock	Carlyle began the season as the head coach, but was fired on January 6, 2015, after posting a 21–16–3 record through 40 games. In 3½ seasons with the Leafs, he compiled a record of 91–78–19. Horachek finished the season with a record of 9–28–5 and was dismissed on April 12, 2015. On May 20, 2015, the Maple Leafs signed Babcock to an eight-year, US$50,000,000 contract (the largest for a coach in NHL history).
In-season
Team	Outgoing coach	Incoming coach	Story / accomplishments
Columbus Blue Jackets	Todd Richards	John Tortorella	Richards was fired on October 21, 2015, after posting a 0–7–0 record through 7 games this season. He had been named interim head coach on January 9, 2012, before being promoted to the franchise's sixth head coach on May 14, 2012. Richards posted a record of 127–112–21 in 260 games. The team made the postseason once under his tenure, going 2–4, including the team's first-ever postseason win on April 19, 2014. On October 21, 2015, the Blue Jackets signed Tortorella, previously head coach of the Vancouver Canucks, to become its next head coach.
Pittsburgh Penguins	Mike Johnston	Mike Sullivan	Johnston was fired on December 12, 2015, after posting a 15–10–3 record through 28 games this season. He had served as the head coach since the start of the 2014–15 season. He left with a record of 58–37–15 in 110 games. The team made the postseason once under his tenure despite going 1–4. On December 12, Sullivan who was coaching the Wilkes-Barre/Scranton Penguins of the American Hockey League at the time, received the call for the head coaching vacancy with the main club.
Minnesota Wild	Mike Yeo	John Torchetti*	Yeo was fired on February 13, 2016, after posting a 23–22–10 record through 55 games this season. He had served as the head coach since the start of the 2011–12 season. He left with a record of 173–132–44 in 349 games and made the playoffs three times despite going 11–17. On February 13, Torchetti who was coaching the Iowa Wild of the American Hockey League at the time, became the interim head coach for the main club.

(*) Indicates interim.

== Arena changes ==
- The 2015–16 season marked the New York Islanders' move from the Nassau Veterans Memorial Coliseum in Uniondale to Barclays Center in Brooklyn.
- The Edmonton Oilers played their final season at Rexall Place. They moved to the newly constructed Rogers Place in the 2016–17 season.

== Regular season ==
The regular season began on October 7, 2015, and ended on April 10, 2016. The playoffs began on Wednesday, April 13, 2016.

=== Winter Classic ===
The 2016 NHL Winter Classic was held on January 1, 2016. The game, the eighth Winter Classic, saw the Montreal Canadiens defeat the Boston Bruins, 5–1, at Gillette Stadium in Foxborough, Massachusetts, a significant event in one of the NHL's best-known rivalries. A Bruins and Canadiens alumni game was also played on December 31, 2015. The Boston Pride women's professional hockey team played before the alumni game against Les Canadiennes of the Canadian Women's Hockey League to a 1–1 tie in the first ever Women's Winter Classic.

=== Stadium Series ===
There were two Stadium Series games planned. The first one featured the Chicago Blackhawks and the Minnesota Wild at TCF Bank Stadium on Sunday, February 21, 2016, where the Wild defeated the Blackhawks 6–1. The other game was the Detroit Red Wings and the Colorado Avalanche at Coors Field on Saturday, February 27, 2016, where the Red Wings defeated the Avalanche 5–3.

=== All–Star Game ===
The 61st National Hockey League All-Star Game was held in Nashville, Tennessee at Bridgestone Arena, home of the Nashville Predators, on January 31, 2016. The All-Star Game adopted a new, three-on-three tournament format; there were three 20-minute games, with four All-Star teams based on the league's four divisions. The Atlantic Division All-Stars faced the Metropolitan Division All-Stars, while the Central Division All-Stars played against the Pacific Division All-Stars. The winners of these two games then met in an All-Star Game Final. Had a tie remained after 20 minutes, then it would have immediately gone to a shootout to determine the winner; there would be no standard overtime. The Pacific Division All-Stars, led by fan-voted captain and MVP John Scott, won the tournament, beating the Atlantic All-Stars in the finals.

=== Postponed games ===
Three games were postponed due to the January 2016 United States blizzard: the Anaheim Ducks–Washington Capitals game originally scheduled for January 22, the Philadelphia Flyers–New York Islanders game originally scheduled for January 23, and the Pittsburgh Penguins–Washington Capitals game originally scheduled for January 24. The Penguins–Capitals game was rescheduled for March 1, while the Ducks–Capitals and Flyers–Islanders games were rescheduled for April 10.

== Standings ==
=== Eastern Conference ===
Top 3 (Metropolitan Division)
Pos	Team	GP	W	L	OTL	ROW	GF	GA	GD	Pts
1	p – Washington Capitals	82	56	18	8	52	252	193	+59	120
2	x – Pittsburgh Penguins	82	48	26	8	44	245	203	+42	104
3	x – New York Rangers	82	46	27	9	43	236	217	+19	101

Source: National Hockey League
p – Clinched Presidents' Trophy; x – Clinched playoff spot

Top 3 (Atlantic Division)
Pos	Team	GP	W	L	OTL	ROW	GF	GA	GD	Pts
1	y – Florida Panthers	82	47	26	9	40	239	203	+36	103
2	x – Tampa Bay Lightning	82	46	31	5	43	227	201	+26	97
3	x – Detroit Red Wings	82	41	30	11	39	211	224	−13	93

Source: National Hockey League
x – Clinched playoff spot; y – Clinched division

Eastern Conference Wild Card
Pos	Div	Team	GP	W	L	OTL	ROW	GF	GA	GD	Pts
1	ME	x – New York Islanders	82	45	27	10	40	232	216	+16	100
2	ME	x – Philadelphia Flyers	82	41	27	14	38	214	218	−4	96
3	AT	Boston Bruins	82	42	31	9	38	240	230	+10	93
4	ME	Carolina Hurricanes	82	35	31	16	33	198	226	−28	86
5	AT	Ottawa Senators	82	38	35	9	32	236	247	−11	85
6	ME	New Jersey Devils	82	38	36	8	36	184	208	−24	84
7	AT	Montreal Canadiens	82	38	38	6	33	221	236	−15	82
8	AT	Buffalo Sabres	82	35	36	11	33	201	222	−21	81
9	ME	Columbus Blue Jackets	82	34	40	8	28	219	252	−33	76
10	AT	Toronto Maple Leafs	82	29	42	11	23	198	246	−48	69

Source: National Hockey League
x – Clinched playoff spot

=== Western Conference ===
Top 3 (Central Division)
Pos	Team	GP	W	L	OTL	ROW	GF	GA	GD	Pts
1	z – Dallas Stars	82	50	23	9	48	267	230	+37	109
2	x – St. Louis Blues	82	49	24	9	44	224	201	+23	107
3	x – Chicago Blackhawks	82	47	26	9	46	235	209	+26	103

Source: National Hockey League
x – Clinched playoff spot; z – Clinched conference

Top 3 (Pacific Division)
Pos	Team	GP	W	L	OTL	ROW	GF	GA	GD	Pts
1	y – Anaheim Ducks	82	46	25	11	43	218	192	+26	103
2	x – Los Angeles Kings	82	48	28	6	46	225	195	+30	102
3	x – San Jose Sharks	82	46	30	6	42	241	210	+31	98

Source: National Hockey League
x – Clinched playoff spot; y – Clinched division

Western Conference Wild Card
Pos	Div	Team	GP	W	L	OTL	ROW	GF	GA	GD	Pts
1	CE	x – Nashville Predators	82	41	27	14	37	228	215	+13	96
2	CE	x – Minnesota Wild	82	38	33	11	35	216	206	+10	87
3	CE	Colorado Avalanche	82	39	39	4	35	216	240	−24	82
4	PA	Arizona Coyotes	82	35	39	8	34	209	245	−36	78
5	CE	Winnipeg Jets	82	35	39	8	32	215	239	−24	78
6	PA	Calgary Flames	82	35	40	7	33	231	260	−29	77
7	PA	Vancouver Canucks	82	31	38	13	26	191	243	−52	75
8	PA	Edmonton Oilers	82	31	43	8	27	203	245	−42	70

Source: National Hockey League
x – Clinched playoff spot

Tie Breakers:
1. Fewer number of games played.
2. Greater Regulation + OT Wins (ROW)
3. Greatest number of points earned in head-to-head play (If teams played an unequal No. of head-to-head games, the result of the first game on the home ice of the team with the extra home game is discarded.)
4. Greater Goal differential

== Player statistics ==
=== Scoring leaders ===
The following players led the league in regular season points at the conclusion of games played on April 10, 2016.

Player	Team	GP	G	A	Pts	+/–	PIM
Patrick Kane	Chicago Blackhawks	82	46	60	106	+17	30
Jamie Benn	Dallas Stars	82	41	48	89	+7	64
Sidney Crosby	Pittsburgh Penguins	80	36	49	85	+19	42
Joe Thornton	San Jose Sharks	82	19	63	82	+25	54
Erik Karlsson	Ottawa Senators	82	16	66	82	–2	50
Joe Pavelski	San Jose Sharks	82	38	40	78	+25	30
Johnny Gaudreau	Calgary Flames	79	30	48	78	+4	20
Blake Wheeler	Winnipeg Jets	82	26	52	78	+8	49
Artemi Panarin	Chicago Blackhawks	80	30	47	77	+8	32
Evgeny Kuznetsov	Washington Capitals	82	20	57	77	+27	32

=== Leading goaltenders ===
The following goaltenders led the league in regular season goals against average at the conclusion of games played on April 10, 2016, while playing at least 1800 minutes.

Player	Team	GP	TOI	W	L	OTL	GA	SO	SV%	GAA
Ben Bishop	Tampa Bay Lightning	61	3584:38	35	21	4	123	6	.926	2.06
Brian Elliott	St. Louis Blues	42	2263:00	23	8	6	78	4	.930	2.07
John Gibson	Anaheim Ducks	40	2294:40	21	13	4	79	4	.920	2.07
Cory Schneider	New Jersey Devils	58	3412:26	27	25	6	122	4	.924	2.15
Braden Holtby	Washington Capitals	66	3841:11	48	9	7	141	3	.922	2.20
Jonathan Quick	Los Angeles Kings	68	4034:29	40	23	5	149	5	.918	2.22
Michal Neuvirth	Philadelphia Flyers	32	1825:29	18	8	4	69	3	.924	2.27
Martin Jones	San Jose Sharks	65	3785:52	37	23	4	143	6	.918	2.27
Marc-Andre Fleury	Pittsburgh Penguins	58	3462:33	35	17	6	132	5	.921	2.29
Frederik Andersen	Anaheim Ducks	43	2297:56	22	9	7	88	3	.919	2.30
Jaroslav Halak	New York Islanders	36	2091:11	18	13	4	80	3	.919	2.30

== Playoffs ==
=== Bracket ===
In each round, teams competed in a best-of-seven series following a 2–2–1–1–1 format (scores in the bracket indicate the number of games won in each best-of-seven series). The team with home ice advantage played at home for games one and two (and games five and seven, if necessary), and the other team was at home for games three and four (and game six, if necessary). The top three teams in each division made the playoffs, along with two wild cards in each conference, for a total of eight teams from each conference. The Wild Card seeded in the Western Conference were previously Central 1 vs Wild Card 1 and Pacific 1 vs Wild Card 2 in the 2014 and 2015 playoffs. In the 2016 playoffs the Wild Card seeded in the Western Conference swapped places Central 1 vs Wild Card 2 and Pacific 1 vs Wild Card 1, while the Eastern Conference Wild Card seeded remain to the same Atlantic 1 vs Wild Card 1 and Metropolitan 1 vs Wild Card 2.

In the first round, the lower seeded wild card in each conference was played against the division winner with the best record while the other wild card was played against the other division winner, and both wild cards were de facto #4 seeds. The other series matched the second and third-place teams from the divisions. In the first two rounds, home ice advantage was awarded to the team with the better seed. In the conference finals and Stanley Cup Final, home ice advantage was awarded to the team with the better regular season record.

First round	Second round
A1	Florida	2
WC1	NY Islanders	4
WC1	NY Islanders	1
A2	Tampa Bay	4
A2	Tampa Bay	4
A3	Detroit	1
Eastern Conference
M1	Washington	4
WC2	Philadelphia	2
M1	Washington	2
M2	Pittsburgh	4
M2	Pittsburgh	4
M3	NY Rangers	1
C1	Dallas	4
WC2	Minnesota	2
C1	Dallas	3
C2	St. Louis	4
C2	St. Louis	4
C3	Chicago	3
Western Conference
P1	Anaheim	3
WC1	Nashville	4
WC1	Nashville	3
P3	San Jose	4
P2	Los Angeles	1
P3	San Jose	4

Conference finals
A2	Tampa Bay	3
M2	Pittsburgh	4
C2	St. Louis	2
P3	San Jose	4

Stanley Cup Finals
M2	Pittsburgh	4
P3	San Jose	2

== NHL awards ==
Awards were presented at the NHL Awards ceremony, to be held following the 2016 Stanley Cup playoffs. Finalists for voted awards are announced during the playoffs and winners are presented at the award ceremony. Voting will conclude immediately after the end of the regular season. The Presidents' Trophy, the Prince of Wales Trophy and Clarence S. Campbell Bowl are not presented at the awards ceremony.

2015–16 NHL awards
Award	Recipient(s)	Runner(s)-up/finalists
Presidents' Trophy (Best regular season record)	Washington Capitals	Dallas Stars
Prince of Wales Trophy (Eastern Conference playoff champion)	Pittsburgh Penguins	Tampa Bay Lightning
Clarence S. Campbell Bowl (Western Conference playoff champion)	San Jose Sharks	St. Louis Blues
Art Ross Trophy (Player with most points)	Patrick Kane (Chicago Blackhawks)	Jamie Benn (Dallas Stars)
Bill Masterton Memorial Trophy (Perseverance, Sportsmanship, and Dedication)	Jaromir Jagr (Florida Panthers)	Pascal Dupuis (Pittsburgh Penguins); Mats Zuccarello (New York Rangers)
Calder Memorial Trophy (Best first-year player)	Artemi Panarin (Chicago Blackhawks)	Shayne Gostisbehere (Philadelphia Flyers); Connor McDavid (Edmonton Oilers)
Conn Smythe Trophy (Most valuable player, playoffs)	Sidney Crosby (Pittsburgh Penguins)	Phil Kessel (Pittsburgh Penguins)
Frank J. Selke Trophy (Defensive forward)	Anze Kopitar (Los Angeles Kings)	Patrice Bergeron (Boston Bruins); Ryan Kesler (Anaheim Ducks)
Hart Memorial Trophy (Most valuable player, regular season)	Patrick Kane (Chicago Blackhawks)	Jamie Benn (Dallas Stars); Sidney Crosby (Pittsburgh Penguins)
Jack Adams Award (Best coach)	Barry Trotz (Washington Capitals)	Gerard Gallant (Florida Panthers); Lindy Ruff (Dallas Stars)
James Norris Memorial Trophy (Best defenceman)	Drew Doughty (Los Angeles Kings)	Brent Burns (San Jose Sharks); Erik Karlsson (Ottawa Senators)
King Clancy Memorial Trophy (Leadership and humanitarian contribution)	Henrik Sedin (Vancouver Canucks)	Patrice Bergeron (Boston Bruins); Mark Giordano (Calgary Flames)
Lady Byng Memorial Trophy (Sportsmanship and excellence)	Anze Kopitar (Los Angeles Kings)	Aleksander Barkov (Florida Panthers); Loui Eriksson (Boston Bruins)
Ted Lindsay Award (Outstanding player)	Patrick Kane (Chicago Blackhawks)	Jamie Benn (Dallas Stars); Braden Holtby (Washington Capitals)
Mark Messier Leadership Award (Leadership and community activities)	Shea Weber (Nashville Predators)	Alexander Ovechkin (Washington Capitals); John Tavares (New York Islanders)
Maurice "Rocket" Richard Trophy (Top goal-scorer)	Alexander Ovechkin (Washington Capitals)	Patrick Kane (Chicago Blackhawks)
NHL Foundation Player Award (Award for community enrichment)	Mark Giordano (Calgary Flames)	Matt Martin (New York Islanders); P. K. Subban (Montreal Canadiens)
NHL General Manager of the Year Award (Top general manager)	Jim Rutherford (Pittsburgh Penguins)	Brian MacLellan (Washington Capitals); Jim Nill (Dallas Stars)
Vezina Trophy (Best goaltender)	Braden Holtby (Washington Capitals)	Ben Bishop (Tampa Bay Lightning); Jonathan Quick (Los Angeles Kings)
William M. Jennings Trophy (Goaltender(s) of team with fewest goals against)	Frederik Andersen and John Gibson (Anaheim Ducks)	Braden Holtby (Washington Capitals)

=== All-Star teams ===
Position	First Team	Second Team	Position	All-Rookie
G	Braden Holtby, Washington Capitals	Ben Bishop, Tampa Bay Lightning	G	John Gibson, Anaheim Ducks
D	Erik Karlsson, Ottawa Senators	Kris Letang, Pittsburgh Penguins	D	Shayne Gostisbehere, Philadelphia Flyers
D	Drew Doughty, Los Angeles Kings	Brent Burns, San Jose Sharks	D	Colton Parayko, St. Louis Blues
C	Sidney Crosby, Pittsburgh Penguins	Joe Thornton, San Jose Sharks	F	Artemi Panarin, Chicago Blackhawks
RW	Patrick Kane, Chicago Blackhawks	Vladimir Tarasenko, St. Louis Blues	F	Connor McDavid, Edmonton Oilers
LW	Jamie Benn, Dallas Stars	Alexander Ovechkin, Washington Capitals	F	Jack Eichel, Buffalo Sabres

== Milestones ==
=== First games ===
The following is a list of notable players who played their first NHL game during the 2015–16 season, listed with their first team.

Player	Team	Notability
Jack Eichel	Buffalo Sabres	Four-time NHL All-Star, NHL All-Rookie Team selection
Connor Hellebuyck	Winnipeg Jets	Hart Memorial Trophy winner, three-time Vezina Trophy winner, two-time William M. Jennings Trophy winner, three-time NHL All-Star team selection, four-time NHL All-Star
Dylan Larkin	Detroit Red Wings	Three-time NHL All-Star, record holder NHL All-Star Skills Competition fastest skater
Connor McDavid	Edmonton Oilers	First overall pick in the 2015 Draft, three-time Hart Memorial Trophy winner, five-time Ted Lindsay Award winner, six-time Art Ross Trophy winner, Maurice "Rocket" Richard Trophy winner, Conn Smythe Trophy winner, eight-time NHL All-Star team selection, seven-time NHL All-Star, NHL All-Rookie Team selection
Artemi Panarin	Chicago Blackhawks	Calder Memorial Trophy winner, four-time NHL All-Star team selection, two-time NHL All-Star, NHL All-Rookie Team selection
Mikko Rantanen	Colorado Avalanche	One-time NHL All-Star team selection, two-time NHL All-Star
Jaccob Slavin	Carolina Hurricanes	Two-time Lady Byng Memorial Trophy winner, one-time NHL All-Star
Linus Ullmark	Buffalo Sabres	Vezina Trophy winner, William M. Jennings Trophy winner, one-time NHL All-Star team selection, one-time NHL All-Star
Scott Wedgewood	New Jersey Devils	William M. Jennings Trophy winner

=== Last games ===
The following is a list of players of note who played their last NHL game in 2015–16, listed with their team:

Player	Team	Notability
Niklas Bäckström	Calgary Flames	Roger Crozier Saving Grace Award winner, William M. Jennings Trophy winner
Dan Boyle	New York Rangers	Over 1,000 games played
Pavel Datsyuk	Detroit Red Wings	9-time NHL All Star, 4-time Lady Byng Memorial Trophy winner, 3-time Frank J. Selke Trophy winner
Patrik Eliáš	New Jersey Devils	Over 1,200 games played
Andrew Ference	Edmonton Oilers	King Clancy Memorial Trophy winner
Scott Gomez	Ottawa Senators	Calder Memorial Trophy winner, over 1,000 games played
Shawn Horcoff	Anaheim Ducks	Over 1,000 games played
Barret Jackman	Nashville Predators	Calder Memorial Trophy winner
Vincent Lecavalier	Los Angeles Kings	Maurice "Rocket" Richard Trophy winner, King Clancy Memorial Trophy winner, over 1,200 games played
David Legwand	Buffalo Sabres	Over 1,100 games played
Brad Richards	Detroit Red Wings	Lady Byng Memorial Trophy winner, Conn Smythe Trophy winner, over 1,100 games played
Alex Tanguay	Arizona Coyotes	Over 1,000 games played
Dainius Zubrus	San Jose Sharks	Over 1,200 games played

=== Major milestones reached ===
- On November 21, 2015, San Jose Sharks forward Patrick Marleau scored his 1,000th career point, becoming the 83rd player in league history to reach this milestone.
- On November 27, 2015, Arizona Coyotes coach Dave Tippett won his 500th game, becoming the 22nd coach in league history to reach this milestone.
- On December 19, 2015, Pittsburgh Penguins forward Phil Kessel played his 500th consecutive game, becoming the 23rd player in league history to reach this milestone.
- On January 4, 2016, Colorado Avalanche forward Jarome Iginla scored his 600th NHL goal, becoming the 19th player in league history to reach this milestone.
- On January 10, 2016, Washington Capitals forward Alexander Ovechkin scored his 500th NHL goal, becoming the 43rd player in league history to reach this milestone.
- On January 14, 2016, Chicago Blackhawks coach Joel Quenneville won his 783rd game, surpassing Al Arbour to become the second coach with most wins in league history.
- On January 21, 2016, Vancouver Canucks forward Daniel Sedin scored his 347th NHL goal, surpassing Markus Naslund for most goals in franchise history.
- On January 26, 2016, San Jose Sharks forward Joe Thornton scored his 1,300th career point, becoming the 33rd player in league history to reach this milestone.
- On February 4, 2016, Florida Panthers forward Jaromir Jagr scored his 1,100th career assist, becoming the sixth player in league history to reach this milestone.
- On February 13, 2016, Boston Bruins coach Claude Julien won his 500th game, becoming the 23rd coach in league history to reach this milestone.
- On February 20, 2016, Florida Panthers forward Jaromir Jagr scored his 742nd career goal, surpassing Brett Hull to become third in career goals.
- On March 7, 2016, Florida Panthers forward Jaromir Jagr scored his 1,851st career point, surpassing Gordie Howe to become third in career points.
- On March 14, 2016, Los Angeles Kings goaltender Jonathan Quick recorded his 41st career shutout, surpassing both Frank Brimsek and John Vanbiesbrouck to become the all-time shutout leader for U.S.-born goaltenders.
- On April 2, 2016, Dallas Stars coach Lindy Ruff won his 700th game, becoming the fifth coach in league history to reach this milestone.
- For the first time in the history of the NHL, Canadian-born players do not comprise a majority the league's players. Of the 680 players who appeared in games over the course of the first two weeks of the season, 49.7 percent were born in Canada, while 24.2 percent were American-born. A record 9.1 percent were from Sweden, and 4.5 percent from Russia.

== Uniforms ==
- The Anaheim Ducks made a minor change to their home jersey. They changed the collar laces from black to white. The team also unveiled their new third jersey; the jersey shows a modern Ducks re-colouring of the old Mighty Ducks of Anaheim logo used from the 1993–94 season to the 2005–06 season. The jersey is primarily orange with black and bronze striping. On both shoulders it features the team's current primary logo and on one side of the collar it features the team's wordmark "ANAHEIM".
- The Arizona Coyotes began using new home and away jerseys. The primary logo stays the same. The jerseys have added a large black stripe on each arm running from just below the shoulder to the elbow. From there it is red-white-red before it runs white right to the cuff. There's a single hem stripe, black on homes and red on the whites. The home red features a new shoulder patch, a beige/sand coyote paw print with a black "A" on it. The road white features a modernized "AZ/map" patch, with the font updated to match the new team wordmark. The pants are black, socks are red, black and white similar to the striping on each arm. The new home and away jerseys replace the home and away jerseys that the Coyotes unveiled last year.
- The Boston Bruins unveiled their new 2016 NHL Winter Classic uniform. The jersey is based on their jersey they wore during the 1924-25 season. The colors have been modernized as black is the primary color, gold and brown as the secondary colors. Two gold horizontal stripes are on each arm and one across the waist. The "Boston" wordmark arched over an illustrated bear and Bruins, the crest varies only slightly in the layout from the 1924-25 original. The crest colors celebrate both the beginning and modern day color palette of this historic franchise, and are executed in felt and chenille materials, similar to the original crest. The numbers are in your standard jersey semi-serif block lettering, names and numbers are in white or cream. The numbers on the sleeves are located between the two gold horizontal stripes. The 2016 Winter Classic logo appears on one shoulder as a patch.
- The Buffalo Sabres have scrapped their alternate jersey that was unveiled for the 2013-14 season. In lieu of a third jersey, with special permission from the league, the team will wear their white away jerseys for six home games in this season.
- The Chicago Blackhawks unveiled a unique jersey for their 2016 NHL Stadium Series game. This jersey is primarily white with black/red/black stripes on the sleeves and socks. The current logo is on the chest. Framed between the two black stripes and over the red stripe on the sleeve is the familiar "C" with crossed tomahawks. The collar of the jersey features two different colors. The four, six-pointed red stars from the Flag of Chicago is featured on the white portion of the collar, while the other side of the collar is black. Sleeve numbers have been shifted to the shoulders and enlarged. With the shoulders being black, the numbering is white. But, the numbering and lettering on the back is also enlarged and black in color.
- The Colorado Avalanche will replace their "Sasquatch" alternate logo by a re-coloured "CO" from the State of Colorado flag. A new third jersey features the logo of the long-departed Colorado Rockies, set in Avalanche colors and number font. In addition to that, they're marking their 20th anniversary with a patch on the front of their jerseys.
- The Avalanche will also wear a special jersey, which will be primarily white with black, red and blue also featured for the 2016 NHL Stadium Series. It incorporates the same Colorado 'C' design that was added to the Avalanche jersey designs earlier this year. It also features larger numbers on the back and on the shoulders. The collar features a "5280" call out, referencing the Avalanche's home in the Mile-High City.
- The Columbus Blue Jackets altered their home and road jerseys slightly. The blue Union Army cap shoulder patch worn from the 2003–04 season until the 2014–15 season was replaced with a new shoulder patch logo. The new shoulder patch logo features the 1857 Napoleon cannon. It is very similar to the club's current third jersey logo, with the only difference is that the logo features the club's primary colors – Navy Blue, Red, Silver and White.
- The Detroit Red Wings unveiled a unique jersey for their 2016 NHL Stadium Series game. This jersey is primarily red with a diagonal white stripe across the chest. Featured inside the diagonal white stripe is the large red redesigned "D" logo. The current Red Wings logo is featured on one shoulder and the 2016 Stadium Series logo is featured on the other shoulder. The word "EST 1926" is written on the inside rear collar and the word "RED WINGS" is written on one side of the front collar. The jersey also features large numbers on the back and on the shoulder as well as a nameplate featuring arched lettering which is all white in color.
- The Edmonton Oilers unveiled a new alternate jersey. This new throwback jersey is a remake of the jersey worn by the franchise during their inaugural season as the Alberta Oilers of the World Hockey Association. The jersey is orange with blue and white shoulders and blue/white/blue stripes on the sleeves. The numbers are in the same location as the original WHA jersey on which they are based.
- The Minnesota Wild unveiled a unique jersey for their 2016 NHL Stadium Series game. This jersey is primarily green with red and beige stripes on the sleeves. Beige is also featured on the shoulders. The current logo is on the chest. On the left shoulder is their "State of Hockey" logo and on the right shoulder is the 2016 Stadium Series logo. The numbering and lettering which are beige in color are enlarged on the sleeve and on the back of the jersey.
- The Montreal Canadiens made some slight alterations to their home and away jerseys. Four brass hexagonal eyelets and white laces will be reintroduced around the collar, which will also revert to pure white in color. On the team's red home jersey, the French "LNH" logo will be stitched at the nape of the neck, and the lone exception to the English "NHL" on the away jersey. It is very similar to the club's home and away jerseys worn from the 1970–71 season to the 1974–75 season. The new home and away jerseys replace the home and away jerseys worn from the 2007–08 season until the 2014–15 season.
- The Montreal Canadiens unveiled their 2016 NHL Winter Classic jerseys. The chest stripe is a shade of blue. The "C" is white and the "H" is red, as they were in 1923-24. An image of the globe is on the sleeves that closely resembles the 1925 version. The French "LNH" logo will be stitched near the collar. Other features included into the design are a red collar, red letters, red numbers and red stripes.
- The Nashville Predators added the 2016 NHL All-Star Game logo as their patch on the front of their jerseys. They hosted it on January 31, 2016.
- The Nashville Predators normally wear blue helmets with their gold home jerseys, but this season they'll switch to gold helmets for Saturday home games.
- The New York Islanders unveiled a new alternate jersey. This New Jersey is in black with white trim, with blue and orange relegated to the back collar. The "NY" wordmark from the Stadium Series thirds was moved to the new alternates, sans the chrome accents. The new third jersey replaces the Stadium Series third jerseys the Islanders wore in the 2014–15 season.
- The New York Islanders added a patch on the right shoulder of the jerseys commemorating their first season in Brooklyn. In addition to that, they have also added a left shoulder "Al" patch in memory of former coach Al Arbour who died on August 28, 2015, at the age of 82.
- The San Jose Sharks added a 25th anniversary patch. The patch features a new, "swimming" Shark with an exposed tail hovering above a diamond-encrusted "25".
- The San Jose Sharks unveiled their "heritage jersey." This design is identical to the road jerseys worn from 1991-92 season through 1997-98 season, adapted to the Reebok Edge uniform system.
- The Washington Capitals added a new alternate jersey to their lineup. The primary color for the uniform is red and closely resembles the team's jersey worn from 1974–75 season through 1994–95 season. The original Capitals wordmark is featured on the front of the jersey with six stars above it and five stars beneath the numbers on each sleeve. The Capitals will wear blue pants and red helmets with their third jerseys. The new third jersey replaces the white third jersey the Capitals wore from the 2011–12 season to the 2014–15 season.

== Broadcast rights ==
This was the fifth season under the NHL's ten-year U.S. rights deal with NBC Sports, and the second season of its twelve-year Canadian rights deals with Rogers Media to show games on Sportsnet. This included Sportsnet's sub-licensing agreements to air Hockey Night in Canada games on CBC Television and French-language broadcasts on TVA Sports.

In August 2015, the league announced a six-year deal with MLB Advanced Media (MLBAM) to take over the technical operations of the NHL's in-house digital properties. Under the agreement, MLBAM took over the operations of the NHL's websites, apps, streaming services, and other digital properties starting in January 2016. MLBAM also took over international distribution of the league's digital out-of-market streaming services outside of Canada and Scandinavia. The NHL also took an equity stake of up to 10 percent in BAM Tech, a spin-off of MLBAM's streaming media business. As an aspect of the deal, the U.S. version of NHL Network was also relocated to the facilities of MLB Network. The Canadian version of NHL Network was shut down August 31, 2015.

The re-launch of the league's digital properties under MLBAM occurred in February 2016, with the launch of the new NHL.com website and mobile app following the 2016 NHL All-Star Game. The re-launched NHL GameCenter Live service outside of Canada was re-branded as NHL.tv, while the Canadian service remains branded as Rogers NHL GameCentre Live. Both services were upgraded to utilize a new client on MLBAM architecture with support for 60 FPS streaming. The re-launch of the services, however, was marred by technical issues caused by a malfunctioning content delivery network.

As the result of a lawsuit settlement, the NHL agreed to offer single-team packages for its out-of-market services in the United States. The updated NHL app also offers a downsized out-of-market subscription service known as NHL Premium, which streams the conclusion of each game (final five minutes, plus overtime/shootouts if needed).

In Canada, the Sunday-night Hometown Hockey game of the week on City was moved to Sportsnet. Both Sportsnet and TSN announced plans to produce telecasts of selected national and regional games in 4K ultra high-definition television.

On March 10, 2016, the NHL announced a deal with Yahoo! Sports, in which it will offer free online streaming in the U.S. of up to four out-of-market games per-week. The site will also feature additional NHL content, such as condensed games and highlight showcases. The deal expands upon an ongoing relationship with U.S. rightsholder NBC, as well as a relationship with Major League Baseball to host the MLB.tv Game of the Day stream.

On May 5, 2016, NBC Sports announced that it would provide national radio broadcasts of the 2016 Stanley Cup Final via NBC Sports Radio. NHL Radio broadcasts had not been heard continent-wide since 2008.

== See also ==
- 2015–16 NHL transactions
- 2015–16 NHL suspensions and fines
- 2015–16 NHL Three Star Awards
- 2016 NHL playoffs
- 2015 in sports
- 2016 in sports
