= 2016–17 NHL season =

National Hockey League season

- The NHL's centennial logo
- League: National Hockey League
- Sport: Ice hockey
- Duration: October 12, 2016 – June 11, 2017
- Games: 82
- Teams: 30
- TV partner(s): CBC, Sportsnet/SN1/SN360, Citytv, FX, TVA Sports (Canada); NBCSN, NBC, CNBC, USA (United States)

Draft
- Top draft pick: Auston Matthews
- Picked by: Toronto Maple Leafs

Regular season
- Presidents' Trophy: Washington Capitals
- Season MVP: Connor McDavid (Oilers)
- Top scorer: Connor McDavid (Oilers)

Playoffs
- Playoffs MVP: Sidney Crosby (Penguins)

Stanley Cup
- Champions: Pittsburgh Penguins
- Runners-up: Nashville Predators

NHL seasons
- 2015–16 2017–18

The 2016–17 NHL season was the 100th season of operation (99th season of play) of the National Hockey League. Thirty teams were competing in an 82-game regular season from October 12, 2016, to April 9, 2017. The 2017 Stanley Cup playoffs began on April 12 and concluded on June 11, with the Pittsburgh Penguins winning the Stanley Cup over the Nashville Predators in six games. On June 11, the Pittsburgh Penguins became the first team to repeat as Stanley Cup champions since the Detroit Red Wings in 1997–98, winning the franchise's fifth Stanley Cup and their third in nine seasons.

== League business ==
=== Salary cap ===
In December 2015, commissioner Gary Bettman informed teams that he projected the salary cap to be at least US$74.5 million for the 2016–17 season, and that it could increase as much as US$3.1 million. It was eventually set at US$73.1 million.

=== Rule changes ===
No major rule changes were implemented this season.

=== Entry draft ===
The 2016 NHL entry draft was held on June 24–25, 2016, at the KeyBank Center in Buffalo, New York. Auston Matthews was selected first overall by the Toronto Maple Leafs.

=== Expansion ===
On June 22, 2016, NHL Commissioner Gary Bettman officially announced that the league had approved an expansion team in Las Vegas, Nevada, later christened the Vegas Golden Knights, who were set to begin play in the 2017–18 season.

=== Centennial celebration ===
On September 27, 2016, the NHL announced that it would organize a series of initiatives and events throughout 2017 to mark the league's 100th year of operations, and the upcoming 2017–18 season — the NHL's 100th season of play. The campaign began with the NHL Centennial Classic outdoor game on January 1, 2017, and continued throughout the calendar year, including documentaries and a daily "Time Capsule" feature across NHL media properties, a "Centennial Truck Tour" of all NHL cities with a traveling museum and other activities, a 2017 Winter Classic-themed float appearing during the Tournament of Roses Parade, and the unveiling of the top 100 players during the weekend of the All-Star Game, and the top 100 moments of the league's history later in the year.

A centennial emblem was designed, which was displayed on all game pucks and as shoulder patches on all jerseys throughout 2017. The centennial campaign extended into the following 2017–18 season. On March 17, 2017, the NHL announced that the Ottawa Senators would host an outdoor game against the Montreal Canadiens, the NHL 100 Classic, at TD Place Stadium on December 16, 2017.

== Coaching changes ==
Coaching changes
Off-season
Team	2015–16 coach	2016–17 coach	Story / Accomplishments
Anaheim Ducks	Bruce Boudreau	Randy Carlyle	Boudreau was fired on April 29, 2016, after losing in the first round of the 2016 Stanley Cup playoffs. Boudreau accumulated a 208–104–40 regular season record and a 21–15 playoff record with the Ducks over five seasons. The Ducks won four consecutive Pacific Division titles from 2012–13 to 2015–16. On June 14, 2016, the Ducks announced that Carlyle, the Ducks' coach from 2005 to 2011, would return to the team to become their head coach for the second time; Carlyle had spent most of the interim coaching the Toronto Maple Leafs from 2012 to 2015.
Calgary Flames	Bob Hartley	Glen Gulutzan	Hartley was fired on May 3, 2016, after accumulating a record of 134–135–25 record over four seasons in Calgary. He was fired just one season after winning the Jack Adams Award for Coach of the Year in the 2014–15 season. On June 17, 2016, Gulutzan was named head coach. He was previously the head coach of the Dallas Stars and most recently an assistant coach for the Vancouver Canucks.
Colorado Avalanche	Patrick Roy	Jared Bednar	On August 11, 2016, Roy abruptly resigned from his positions as head coach and vice president of hockey operations in a dispute over Roy's input in personnel decisions. Roy had a record of 130–92–24 over three seasons in Colorado and won a Jack Adams Award after leading the Avalanche to the playoffs in his first season as head coach. Bednar was most recently the head coach of the Calder Cup-winning Lake Erie Monsters.
Minnesota Wild	Mike Yeo; John Torchetti*	Bruce Boudreau	Yeo began the season as the head coach, but was fired on February 13, 2016, after posting a 23–22–10 record through 55 games. In 4½ seasons with the Wild, he compiled a record of 173–132–44. Yeo was named head coach in waiting for the St. Louis Blues and will serve one season as associate head coach before current head coach Ken Hitchcock retires. Torchetti finished the season with a record of 15–11–1, lost 4–2 to the Dallas Stars in the 2016 First Round, and was dismissed May 7, 2016; Torchetti eventually became an assistant with the Detroit Red Wings. On the same day, Boudreau, most recently head coach of the Anaheim Ducks, and the Wild reached an agreement for him to become their next head coach.
Ottawa Senators	Dave Cameron	Guy Boucher	Cameron was fired on April 12, 2016, after accumulating a record of 70–50–17 after 1¾ seasons. The team made the postseason once under his tenure losing to the Montreal Canadiens, 4–2 in the 2015 First Round. Boucher, who had previously coached the Tampa Bay Lightning from 2010–13, had spent parts of the last two seasons with SC Bern in Switzerland.
In-season
Team	Outgoing coach	Incoming coach	Story / Accomplishments
Boston Bruins	Claude Julien	Bruce Cassidy*	Julien was fired on February 7, 2017, after posting a 26–23–6 record through 55 games this season. He was the longest tenured coach for one team at the time, serving with the Bruins since the start of the 2007–08 season. He left with a record of 419–246–94 over nine regular seasons, winning the Northeast/Atlantic Division title four times and the Presidents' Trophy once. The team made the postseason every year except 2015 and 2016 under his tenure, accumulating a 57–40 record and winning the Stanley Cup in 2011 and going to the Cup Final in 2013. Bruce Cassidy, who was serving as the assistant coach, and previously was head coach to the Bruins' AHL affiliate, stepped in to the fill the spot as interim head coach.
Florida Panthers	Gerard Gallant	Tom Rowe*	Gallant was fired on November 27, 2016, after posting an 11–10–1 record through 22 games this season. He served as the head coach since the start of the 2014–15 season. He left with a record of 96–65–25 in 186 games. The team made the postseason once during his tenure, winning the Atlantic Division with a 47–26–9 record, but went 2–4 during the playoffs. Tom Rowe, former coach of the Portland Pirates, the AHL affiliate of the Panthers, and general manager of the Panthers at the time, stepped in to fill the spot as interim head coach.
Montreal Canadiens	Michel Therrien	Claude Julien	Therrien was fired by the Canadiens on February 14, 2017, after a 1–5–1 record in February. Therrien led the team to a 31–19–8 record on the season (which was good for first in the Atlantic Division at the time) and a 165–107–32 record since taking over in 2012. In his second season, the Canadiens made it to the Eastern Conference Final. He was replaced by former Bruins coach Claude Julien, who before his firing on February 7, was the longest tenured head coach in the NHL. Ironically, in Michel Therrien's first tenure with Montreal, he was also replaced by Claude Julien.
New York Islanders	Jack Capuano	Doug Weight*	Capuano was fired on January 17, 2017, after posting a 17–17–8 record through 42 games this season. He served as the head coach since the middle of the 2010–11 season. He left with a 227–192–64 record throughout the regular season. The Islanders made the playoffs three times under his tenure going 10–14 going as far as the second round in 2016. Doug Weight who was serving as the assistant manager, stepped in to fill the spot as interim head coach.
St. Louis Blues	Ken Hitchcock	Mike Yeo	Hitchcock was fired on February 1, 2017, after posting a 24–21–5 record through 50 games this season. He served as the head coach since November 2011 during the 2011–12 season. He left with a record of 248–124–41 over five regular seasons. The team made the postseason during every season of his tenure going 20–27, making it as far as the Western Conference Final during the previous season. Mike Yeo, who was fired by the Minnesota Wild the previous season, and would have been the head coach starting the 2017–18 season, was promoted from his position of associate coach.

(*) Indicates interim.

== Arena changes ==
- This was the Edmonton Oilers' first season at Rogers Place replacing their old arena, the Northlands Coliseum. The team played its first regular season home game on October 12, 2016, against the Calgary Flames.
- This was the Detroit Red Wings' final season at Joe Louis Arena before moving into their new arena, Little Caesars Arena, in October 2017 in time for the 2017–18 NHL season.
- The Pittsburgh Penguins' home arena was renamed from "Consol Energy Center" to PPG Paints Arena on October 4, 2016, although previous rights owner Consol Energy will remain a corporate sponsor with the Penguins.
- The Buffalo Sabres' home arena was renamed to KeyBank Center, following KeyCorp's acquisition of previous rights holder First Niagara Bank. This is the fourth name change for the arena since it opened in 1996, all related to bank mergers.

== Regular season ==
The regular season began on October 12, 2016, and ended on April 9, 2017. The playoffs began on April 12, 2017, and ended on June 11, 2017. The schedule was released on June 21, 2016. Each team will receive a five-day "bye week" and no practices can be held during the time period.

=== Outdoor games ===
Four outdoor games were played during the 2016–17 season.

The Winnipeg Jets hosted the Heritage Classic against the Edmonton Oilers at Investors Group Field on October 23, 2016. The Oilers won the game, 3–0.

The Toronto Maple Leafs hosted the Centennial Classic at BMO Field on January 1, 2017, against the Detroit Red Wings. The game commemorated the 100th season of the Maple Leafs and NHL as a whole. The following day, January 2, 2017, the St. Louis Blues hosted the Winter Classic at Busch Stadium against the Chicago Blackhawks.

On February 25, 2017, the Pittsburgh Penguins defeated the Philadelphia Flyers 4–2 at Heinz Field during the 2017 NHL Stadium Series.

=== All–Star Game ===
The 62nd National Hockey League All-Star Game was held in Los Angeles at Staples Center, home of the Los Angeles Kings, on January 29, 2017. The format was identical to the 2016 All-Star Game.

=== Postponed games ===
The Detroit Red Wings – Carolina Hurricanes game scheduled for December 19, 2016, at PNC Arena in Raleigh, North Carolina, was postponed due to poor ice conditions. The game was rescheduled for March 27, 2017. This resulted in the two teams playing in Raleigh on consecutive nights, as they were already scheduled to play each other on March 28, and caused Detroit to play games on three consecutive nights.

The Winnipeg Jets – New Jersey Devils game scheduled for March 14, 2017, at the Prudential Center in Newark, New Jersey, was postponed due to the effects of the March 2017 nor'easter. The game was rescheduled for March 28. This resulted in both teams forfeiting a three-day break from March 27 to 29.

== Standings ==
=== Eastern Conference ===
Top 3 (Metropolitan Division)
Pos	Team	GP	W	L	OTL	ROW	GF	GA	GD	Pts
1	p – Washington Capitals	82	55	19	8	53	263	182	+81	118
2	x – Pittsburgh Penguins	82	50	21	11	46	282	234	+48	111
3	x – Columbus Blue Jackets	82	50	24	8	47	249	195	+54	108

Source: National Hockey League
p – Clinched Presidents' Trophy; x – Clinched playoff spot

Top 3 (Atlantic Division)
Pos	Team	GP	W	L	OTL	ROW	GF	GA	GD	Pts
1	y – Montreal Canadiens	82	47	26	9	44	226	200	+26	103
2	x – Ottawa Senators	82	44	28	10	38	212	214	−2	98
3	x – Boston Bruins	82	44	31	7	42	234	212	+22	95

Source: National Hockey League
x – Clinched playoff spot; y – Clinched division

Eastern Conference Wild Card
Pos	Div	Team	GP	W	L	OTL	ROW	GF	GA	GD	Pts
1	ME	x – New York Rangers	82	48	28	6	45	256	220	+36	102
2	AT	x – Toronto Maple Leafs	82	40	27	15	39	251	242	+9	95
3	ME	New York Islanders	82	41	29	12	39	241	242	−1	94
4	AT	Tampa Bay Lightning	82	42	30	10	38	234	227	+7	94
5	ME	Philadelphia Flyers	82	39	33	10	32	219	236	−17	88
6	ME	Carolina Hurricanes	82	36	31	15	33	215	236	−21	87
7	AT	Florida Panthers	82	35	36	11	30	210	237	−27	81
8	AT	Detroit Red Wings	82	33	36	13	24	207	244	−37	79
9	AT	Buffalo Sabres	82	33	37	12	31	201	237	−36	78
10	ME	New Jersey Devils	82	28	40	14	25	183	244	−61	70

Source: National Hockey League
x – Clinched playoff spot

=== Western Conference ===
Top 3 (Central Division)
Pos	Team	GP	W	L	OTL	ROW	GF	GA	GD	Pts
1	z – Chicago Blackhawks	82	50	23	9	46	244	213	+31	109
2	x – Minnesota Wild	82	49	25	8	46	266	208	+58	106
3	x – St. Louis Blues	82	46	29	7	44	235	218	+17	99

Source: National Hockey League
x – Clinched playoff spot; z – Clinched conference

Top 3 (Pacific Division)
Pos	Team	GP	W	L	OTL	ROW	GF	GA	GD	Pts
1	y – Anaheim Ducks	82	46	23	13	43	223	200	+23	105
2	x – Edmonton Oilers	82	47	26	9	43	247	212	+35	103
3	x – San Jose Sharks	82	46	29	7	44	221	201	+20	99

Source: National Hockey League
x – Clinched playoff spot; y – Clinched division

Western Conference Wild Card
Pos	Div	Team	GP	W	L	OTL	ROW	GF	GA	GD	Pts
1	PA	x – Calgary Flames	82	45	33	4	41	226	221	+5	94
2	CE	x – Nashville Predators	82	41	29	12	39	240	224	+16	94
3	CE	Winnipeg Jets	82	40	35	7	37	249	256	−7	87
4	PA	Los Angeles Kings	82	39	35	8	37	201	205	−4	86
5	CE	Dallas Stars	82	34	37	11	33	223	262	−39	79
6	PA	Arizona Coyotes	82	30	42	10	24	197	260	−63	70
7	PA	Vancouver Canucks	82	30	43	9	26	182	243	−61	69
8	CE	Colorado Avalanche	82	22	56	4	21	166	278	−112	48

Source: National Hockey League
x – Clinched playoff spot

Tie Breakers:
1. Fewer number of games played.
2. Greater Regulation + OT Wins (ROW)
3. Greatest number of points earned in head-to-head play (If teams played an unequal # of head-to-head games, the result of the first game on the home ice of the team with the extra home game is discarded.)
4. Greater Goal differential

== Playoffs ==
=== Bracket ===
In each round, teams competed in a best-of-seven series following a 2–2–1–1–1 format (scores in the bracket indicate the number of games won in each best-of-seven series). The team with home ice advantage played at home for games one and two (and games five and seven, if necessary), and the other team was at home for games three and four (and game six, if necessary). The top three teams in each division made the playoffs, along with two wild cards in each conference, for a total of eight teams from each conference.

In the first round, the lower seeded wild card in each conference was played against the division winner with the best record while the other wild card was played against the other division winner, and both wild cards were de facto #4 seeds. The other series matched the second and third-place teams from the divisions. In the first two rounds, home ice advantage was awarded to the team with the better seed. In the conference finals and Stanley Cup Final, home ice advantage was awarded to the team with the better regular season record.

First round	Second round
A1	Montreal	2
WC1	NY Rangers	4
WC1	NY Rangers	2
A2	Ottawa	4
A2	Ottawa	4
A3	Boston	2
Eastern Conference
M1	Washington	4
WC2	Toronto	2
M1	Washington	3
M2	Pittsburgh	4
M2	Pittsburgh	4
M3	Columbus	1
C1	Chicago	0
WC2	Nashville	4
WC2	Nashville	4
C3	St. Louis	2
C2	Minnesota	1
C3	St. Louis	4
Western Conference
P1	Anaheim	4
WC1	Calgary	0
P1	Anaheim	4
P2	Edmonton	3
P2	Edmonton	4
P3	San Jose	2

Conference finals
A2	Ottawa	3
M2	Pittsburgh	4
WC2	Nashville	4
P1	Anaheim	2

Stanley Cup Finals
M2	Pittsburgh	4
WC2	Nashville	2

== Statistics ==
=== Scoring leaders ===
The following players led the league in regular season points at the conclusion of games played on April 9, 2017.

Player	Team	GP	G	A	Pts	+/–	PIM
Connor McDavid	Edmonton Oilers	82	30	70	100	+27	26
Sidney Crosby	Pittsburgh Penguins	75	44	45	89	+17	24
Patrick Kane	Chicago Blackhawks	82	34	55	89	+11	32
Nicklas Backstrom	Washington Capitals	82	23	63	86	+17	38
Nikita Kucherov	Tampa Bay Lightning	74	40	45	85	+13	38
Brad Marchand	Boston Bruins	80	39	46	85	+18	81
Mark Scheifele	Winnipeg Jets	79	32	50	82	+18	38
Leon Draisaitl	Edmonton Oilers	82	29	48	77	+7	20
Brent Burns	San Jose Sharks	82	29	47	76	+19	40
Vladimir Tarasenko	St. Louis Blues	82	39	36	75	–1	12

=== Leading goaltenders ===
The following goaltenders led the league in regular season goals against average at the conclusion of games played on April 9, 2017, while playing at least 1800 minutes.

Player	Team	GP	TOI	W	L	OTL	GA	SO	SV%	GAA
Sergei Bobrovsky	Columbus Blue Jackets	63	3707:04	41	17	5	127	7	.931	2.06
Braden Holtby	Washington Capitals	63	3680:10	42	13	6	127	9	.925	2.07
Peter Budaj	Los Angeles/Tampa Bay	60	3308:16	30	21	3	120	7	.915	2.18
John Gibson	Anaheim Ducks	52	2950:21	25	16	9	109	6	.924	2.22
Carey Price	Montreal Canadiens	62	3708:08	37	20	5	138	3	.923	2.23
Tuukka Rask	Boston Bruins	65	3679:30	37	20	5	137	8	.915	2.23
Devan Dubnyk	Minnesota Wild	65	3758:00	40	19	5	141	5	.923	2.25
Craig Anderson	Ottawa Senators	40	2421:14	25	11	4	92	5	.926	2.28
Cam Talbot	Edmonton Oilers	73	4294:00	42	22	8	171	7	.919	2.39
Martin Jones	San Jose Sharks	65	3800:21	35	23	6	152	2	.912	2.40

== NHL awards ==
Awards were presented at the NHL Awards ceremony, to be held following the 2017 Stanley Cup playoffs. Finalists for voted awards are announced during the playoffs and winners are presented at the award ceremony. Voting will conclude immediately after the end of the regular season. The Presidents' Trophy, the Prince of Wales Trophy and Clarence S. Campbell Bowl are not presented at the awards ceremony.

2016–17 NHL awards
Award	Recipient(s)	Runner(s)-up/Finalists
Presidents' Trophy (Best regular season record)	Washington Capitals	Pittsburgh Penguins
Prince of Wales Trophy (Eastern Conference playoff champion)	Pittsburgh Penguins	Ottawa Senators
Clarence S. Campbell Bowl (Western Conference playoff champion)	Nashville Predators	Anaheim Ducks
Art Ross Trophy (Player with most points)	Connor McDavid (Edmonton Oilers)	Sidney Crosby (Pittsburgh Penguins); Patrick Kane (Chicago Blackhawks)
Bill Masterton Memorial Trophy (Perseverance, Sportsmanship, and Dedication)	Craig Anderson (Ottawa Senators)	Andrew Cogliano (Anaheim Ducks); Derek Ryan (Carolina Hurricanes)
Calder Memorial Trophy (Best first-year player)	Auston Matthews (Toronto Maple Leafs)	Patrik Laine (Winnipeg Jets); Zach Werenski (Columbus Blue Jackets)
Conn Smythe Trophy (Most valuable player, playoffs)	Sidney Crosby (Pittsburgh Penguins)	Evgeni Malkin (Pittsburgh Penguins)
Frank J. Selke Trophy (Defensive forward)	Patrice Bergeron (Boston Bruins)	Ryan Kesler (Anaheim Ducks); Mikko Koivu (Minnesota Wild)
Hart Memorial Trophy (Most valuable player, regular season)	Connor McDavid (Edmonton Oilers)	Sergei Bobrovsky (Columbus Blue Jackets); Sidney Crosby (Pittsburgh Penguins)
Jack Adams Award (Best coach)	John Tortorella (Columbus Blue Jackets)	Mike Babcock (Toronto Maple Leafs); Todd McLellan (Edmonton Oilers)
James Norris Memorial Trophy (Best defenceman)	Brent Burns (San Jose Sharks)	Victor Hedman (Tampa Bay Lightning); Erik Karlsson (Ottawa Senators)
King Clancy Memorial Trophy (Leadership and humanitarian contribution)	Nick Foligno (Columbus Blue Jackets)	Mark Giordano (Calgary Flames); Victor Hedman (Tampa Bay Lightning)
Lady Byng Memorial Trophy (Sportsmanship and excellence)	Johnny Gaudreau (Calgary Flames)	Mikael Granlund (Minnesota Wild); Vladimir Tarasenko (St. Louis Blues)
Ted Lindsay Award (Outstanding player)	Connor McDavid (Edmonton Oilers)	Brent Burns (San Jose Sharks); Sidney Crosby (Pittsburgh Penguins)
Mark Messier Leadership Award (Leadership and community activities)	Nick Foligno (Columbus Blue Jackets)	Ryan Getzlaf (Anaheim Ducks); Mark Giordano (Calgary Flames)
Maurice "Rocket" Richard Trophy (Top goal-scorer)	Sidney Crosby (Pittsburgh Penguins)	Nikita Kucherov (Tampa Bay Lightning); Auston Matthews (Toronto Maple Leafs)
NHL Foundation Player Award (Award for community enrichment)	Travis Hamonic (New York Islanders)	Wayne Simmonds (Philadelphia Flyers)
NHL General Manager of the Year Award (Top general manager)	David Poile (Nashville Predators)	Peter Chiarelli (Edmonton Oilers); Pierre Dorion (Ottawa Senators)
Vezina Trophy (Best goaltender)	Sergei Bobrovsky (Columbus Blue Jackets)	Braden Holtby (Washington Capitals); Carey Price (Montreal Canadiens)
William M. Jennings Trophy (Goaltender(s) of team with fewest goals against)	Braden Holtby (Washington Capitals)	Sergei Bobrovsky (Columbus Blue Jackets)

=== All-Star teams ===
Position	First Team	Second Team	Position	All-Rookie
G	Sergei Bobrovsky, Columbus Blue Jackets	Braden Holtby, Washington Capitals	G	Matt Murray, Pittsburgh Penguins
D	Erik Karlsson, Ottawa Senators	Victor Hedman, Tampa Bay Lightning	D	Brady Skjei, New York Rangers
D	Brent Burns, San Jose Sharks	Duncan Keith, Chicago Blackhawks	D	Zach Werenski, Columbus Blue Jackets
C	Connor McDavid, Edmonton Oilers	Sidney Crosby, Pittsburgh Penguins	F	Auston Matthews, Toronto Maple Leafs
RW	Patrick Kane, Chicago Blackhawks	Nikita Kucherov, Tampa Bay Lightning	F	Patrik Laine, Winnipeg Jets
LW	Brad Marchand, Boston Bruins	Artemi Panarin, Chicago Blackhawks	F	Mitch Marner, Toronto Maple Leafs

== Milestones ==
=== First games ===
The following is a list of notable players who played their first NHL game during the 2016–17 season, listed with their first team.

Player	Team	Notability
Mathew Barzal	New York Islanders	2017–18 Calder Memorial Trophy winner, three-time NHL All-Star
Kyle Connor	Winnipeg Jets	Lady Byng Memorial Trophy winner, two-time NHL All-Star, One-time NHL All-Star team selection
Mitch Marner	Toronto Maple Leafs	Two-time NHL All-Star team selection, three-time NHL All-Star, NHL All-Rookie Team selection
Auston Matthews	Toronto Maple Leafs	First overall pick in the 2016 Draft, 2016–17 Calder Memorial Trophy winner, Hart Memorial Trophy winner, Ted Lindsay Award winner, three-time Maurice "Rocket" Richard Trophy winner, two-time NHL All-Star team selection, seven-time NHL All-Star, NHL All-Rookie Team selection
Matthew Tkachuk	Calgary Flames	Two-time NHL All-Star team selection, two-time NHL All-Star
Zach Werenski	Columbus Blue Jackets	James Norris Memorial Trophy winner, two-time NHL All-Star team selection, two-time NHL All-Star

=== Last games ===
The following is a list of players of note who played their last NHL game in 2016–17, listed with their team:

Player	Team	Notability
Brian Campbell	Chicago Blackhawks	Lady Byng Memorial Trophy winner, over 1,000 games played
Shane Doan	Arizona Coyotes	2-time NHL All-Star, King Clancy Memorial Trophy winner, Mark Messier Leadership Award winner, over 1,500 games played, the last active player to have been a member of the original Winnipeg Jets
Marian Hossa	Chicago Blackhawks	5-time NHL All-Star, over 1,300 games played, 1,134 career points
Jarome Iginla	Los Angeles Kings	Art Ross Trophy winner, Lester B. Pearson Trophy winner, King Clancy Memorial Trophy winner, Mark Messier Leadership Award winner, 2-time Maurice "Rocket" Richard Trophy winner, 6-time NHL All-Star, over 1,500 games played
Chris Neil	Ottawa Senators	Over 1,000 games played
Mike Ribeiro	Nashville Predators	Over 1,000 games played

=== Major milestones reached ===
- On October 12, 2016, Toronto Maple Leafs forward Auston Matthews became the first player in the modern era to score four goals in his NHL debut.
- On October 18, 2016, Chicago Blackhawks forward Marian Hossa became the 44th player in league history to score 500 goals.
- On October 20, 2016, Florida Panthers forward Jaromir Jagr became the third player in league history to score 750 goals.
- On November 1, 2016, St. Louis Blues defenceman Jay Bouwmeester played his 1,000th NHL game. becoming the 307th player in league history to reach the mark.
- On November 12, 2016, Montreal Canadiens goaltender Carey Price became the first goaltender in league history to win his first 10 games of the season.
- On November 20, 2016, Los Angeles Kings forward Jeff Carter scored his 600th point.
- On December 10, 2016, Ottawa Senators forward Chris Neil played his 1,000th NHL game. becoming the 308th player in league history to reach the mark.
- On December 10, 2016, Colorado Avalanche forward Jarome Iginla participated in his 1,500th NHL game becoming the 16th player to do so.
- On December 18, 2016, Columbus Blue Jackets head coach John Tortorella won his 500th game, becoming the first American-born coach, as well as 24th overall, with 500 victories.
- On December 22, 2016, Florida Panthers forward Jaromir Jagr scored his 1,888th career point, surpassing Mark Messier to become second in career points.
- On December 22, 2016, Los Angeles Kings forward Anze Kopitar scored his 700th point.
- On December 23, 2016, Arizona Coyotes forward Shane Doan scored his 400th goal and played his 1,500th game with the Coyotes.
- On December 31, 2016, New York Rangers goaltender Henrik Lundqvist recorded his 390th career win, surpassing Dominik Hasek to become the all-time wins leader among European-born goaltenders.
- On January 2, 2017, St. Louis Blues forward Alexander Steen scored his 500th point.
- On January 7, 2017, San Jose Sharks forward Joe Pavelski scored his 600th point.
- On January 11, 2017, Washington Capitals forward Alexander Ovechkin became the 84th player in league history to score 1,000 points.
- On January 13, 2017, New York Islanders forward John Tavares scored his 500th point.
- On January 20, 2017, Vancouver Canucks forward Henrik Sedin became the 85th player in league history to score 1,000 points.
- On January 22, 2017, Nashville Predators head coach Peter Laviolette won his 500th game, becoming the 25th coach, and second American-born, to reach the mark.
- On February 2, 2017, San Jose Sharks forward Patrick Marleau became the 45th player in league history to score 500 goals.
- On February 3, 2017, New York Islanders forward Jason Chimera played his 1,000th game, becoming the 309th player in league history to reach the mark.
- On February 11, 2017, New York Rangers goaltender Henrik Lundqvist became the 12th goaltender in league history to win 400 games.
- On February 15, 2017, Florida Panthers forward Jaromir Jagr scored his 1,900th point.
- On February 16, 2017, Pittsburgh Penguins forward Sidney Crosby became the 86th player in league history to score 1,000 points.
- On February 19, 2017, Chicago Blackhawks forward Patrick Kane became the first American-born player in league history to score 20 or more goals in his first 10 seasons.
- On February 26, 2017, Arizona Coyotes forward Radim Vrbata scored his 600th point.
- On February 28, 2017, Washington Capitals head coach Barry Trotz won his 700th game, becoming the sixth coach to reach the mark.
- On March 6, 2017, San Jose Sharks forward Joe Thornton became the 13th player in league history to reach 1,000 assists.
- On March 9, 2017, Arizona Coyotes forward Radim Vrbata played his 1,000th NHL game, becoming the 310th player in league history to reach the mark.
- On March 13, 2017, the Calgary Flames won their tenth consecutive game, joining the Columbus Blue Jackets (16 games), Minnesota Wild (12) and Philadelphia Flyers (10), marking the 2016–17 season as the first with a win streak of 10 or more games from four teams.
- On March 19, 2017, Minnesota Wild forward Eric Staal played his 1,000th NHL game, becoming the 311th player in league history to reach the mark.
- On March 19, 2017, Florida Panthers forward Jaromir Jagr played his 1,700th NHL game, becoming the fourth player in league history to reach the mark.
- On March 27, 2017, Buffalo Sabres forward Brian Gionta played his 1,000th NHL game, becoming the 312th player in league history to reach the mark.
- On March 28, 2017, Washington Capitals goaltender Braden Holtby became the third goaltender in league history to record at least 40 wins in three consecutive seasons, joining Martin Brodeur (2005–2008) and Evgeni Nabokov (2007–2010).
- On March 28, 2017, Washington Capitals forward Alexander Ovechkin scored his 558th career goal, passing Johnny Bucyk for 26th on the NHL's all-time scoring list.
- On April 9, 2017, Detroit Red Wings forward Henrik Zetterberg played his 1,000th NHL game, becoming the 313th player to reach the mark.

== Uniforms ==
- The Calgary Flames changed alternate jerseys, retiring the script-laden, Western-style alternate used since 2013 in favor of their throwback red uniforms, which had previously been given alternate distinction from 2010 to 2013.
- The Florida Panthers unveiled a brand new logo and uniform set on June 2, 2016, for the 2016–17 season.
- The Los Angeles Kings unveiled a special third jersey for their 50th anniversary.
- The Nashville Predators switched to gold helmets full-time when playing at home.
- The Philadelphia Flyers released a special third jersey for their 50th anniversary. The team had previously unveiled a teaser photo of this jersey, showing the 50th anniversary patch on the right shoulder of the uniform. The numbers on the back and sleeves of this jersey are gold, and the main crest is also outlined in gold. The team has also announced a black Stadium Series jersey with orange detailing for its Stadium Series game against the Penguins.
- The Pittsburgh Penguins return to using black and "Pittsburgh gold" as their primary colors and will debut a new away uniform retiring "Vegas gold" that has been used in at least some capacity since 2000. As with the Flyers, the Penguins are debuting a new Stadium Series jersey for the February 25 outdoor game, this one being predominantly yellow with black sleeves and a keystone-shaped "City of Champions" patch.
- The Toronto Maple Leafs unveiled a new logo on February 2, 2016, for the team's centennial season. Their new uniforms were unveiled during the 2016 NHL entry draft. For the 2017 Centennial Classic, the Leafs wore specially designed jerseys which recalled their history as the Toronto Arenas and Toronto St. Patricks.
- The Detroit Red Wings joined the Maple Leafs in unveiling Centennial Classic jerseys for the game played on January 1, 2017.
- Beginning January 1, 2017, all jerseys contain patches of the NHL's centennial emblem, located above or below the numbers on their right sleeves.
- From February 15, 2017, until the end of the regular season, the Detroit Red Wings wore a commemorative "Mr. I" patch on the shoulder of their jerseys in memory of team owner, Mike Ilitch, who died on February 10, 2017.

== Media rights ==
=== National ===
This was the sixth season under the NHL's ten-year U.S. rights deal with NBC Sports, and the third season of its twelve-year Canadian rights deals with Rogers Media to show games on Sportsnet. This included Sportsnet's sub-licensing agreements to air Hockey Night in Canada games on CBC Television and French-language broadcasts on TVA Sports.

Ron MacLean was reinstated as host of Hockey Night in Canada for the 2016–17 season to replace George Stroumboulopoulos, whose introduction in the 2014–15 season was met with mixed reception by viewers. MacLean hosted the early game of the weekly doubleheader, with David Amber handling the late games. Alongside HNIC, MacLean continued to host the travelling, Sunday-night Hometown Hockey games on Sportsnet.

=== Local ===
- On June 20, 2016, the Buffalo Sabres announced that it had agreed to a 10-year extension of its regional television rights deal with MSG. As part of the agreement, MSG established a joint venture with the team's ownership group Pegula Sports and Entertainment known as MSG Western New York, which subsumed the existing regional feed for the Sabres' home market, and featured additional team-produced programming for the Sabres and their sister NFL team, the Buffalo Bills. There were no on-air changes in staffing for Sabres telecasts.
- On June 27, 2016, Sports Business Daily reported that the NHL had reached a deal in principle with Fox Sports to allow in-market, authenticated online streaming for eligible pay TV subscribers, of regional NHL games on Fox Sports Networks via the Fox Sports Go service.

== See also ==
- 2016–17 NHL transactions
- 2016–17 NHL suspensions and fines
- 2016–17 NHL Three Star Awards
- 2016 in sports
- 2017 in sports
- List of National Hockey League attendance figures
