= Halifax Rules =

Ice hockey rules

The Halifax Rules were ice hockey rules published in 1943 by a Nova Scotia newspaper reporter named James Power, who was known colloquially as 'The Dean of Canadian Sports Reporters.' Power recorded the rules as related to him by Byron Weston who had become the president of the Dartmouth Amateur Athletic Association and who had played in the Halifax-Dartmouth area as early as the 1860s with teams from the area including native Mi'kmaq players. The rules are purported to have been used in the Halifax-Dartmouth area prior to hockey being played in Montreal (starting in 1875), however no contemporary sources confirm this.

== The rules ==
1. The game was played with a block of wood for a puck.
2. The puck was not allowed to leave the ice.
3. The stones marking the place to score goals were placed on the ice at opposite angles to those at present.
4. There was to be no slashing.
5. There was to be no lifting the stick above the shoulder.
6. When a goal was scored, ends were changed.
7. Players had to keep 'on side' of his stick.
8. The forward pass was permitted.
9. Players played the entire game.
10. There was a no-replacement rule for penalized players.
11. The game had two thirty-minute periods with a ten-minute break.
12. The goalkeeper had to stand for the entire game.
13. Goals were decided by the goal umpires, who stood at the goalmouth and rang a handbell.
