= 2015–16 Minnesota Wild season =

NHL team seasonal recap

2015–16 Minnesota Wild
- Division: 5th Central
- Conference: 8th Western
- 2015–16 record: 38–33–11
- Home record: 21–16–4
- Road record: 17–17–7
- Goals for: 216
- Goals against: 206

Team information
- General manager: Chuck Fletcher
- Coach: Mike Yeo (Oct.–Feb.); John Torchetti (interim, Feb.–Apr.)
- Captain: Mikko Koivu
- Alternate captains: Zach Parise; Ryan Suter
- Arena: Xcel Energy Center
- Average attendance: 19,827 (113.2%) (41 games)
- Minor league affiliate: Iowa Wild (AHL)

Team leaders
- Goals: Zach Parise (25)
- Assists: Ryan Suter (43)
- Points: Mikko Koivu (56)
- Penalty minutes: Ryan Carter (46)
- Plus/minus: Erik Haula (+21)
- Wins: Devan Dubnyk (32)
- Goals against average: Devan Dubnyk (2.33)

The 2015–16 Minnesota Wild season was the 16th season for the National Hockey League (NHL) franchise that was established on June 25, 1997. Head coach Mike Yeo was relieved of his duties on February 13 after the teams thirteenth loss in fourteen games. He finished with a record of 173–132–44 in his four and a half years as head coach of the Wild. Iowa Wild head coach John Torchetti was promoted to interim head coach. Minnesota was the first team since the 2009–10 Philadelphia Flyers and the 2009–10 Montreal Canadiens and the first team to do so in the west since the Edmonton Oilers 1999–00 season and the San Jose Sharks 1999–00 season to make the playoffs with fewer than 90 points.

== Standings ==
Central Division
Pos	Team	GP	W	L	OTL	ROW	GF	GA	GD	Pts
1	z – Dallas Stars	82	50	23	9	48	267	230	+37	109
2	x – St. Louis Blues	82	49	24	9	44	224	201	+23	107
3	x – Chicago Blackhawks	82	47	26	9	46	235	209	+26	103
4	x – Nashville Predators	82	41	27	14	37	228	215	+13	96
5	x – Minnesota Wild	82	38	33	11	35	216	206	+10	87
6	Colorado Avalanche	82	39	39	4	35	216	240	−24	82
7	Winnipeg Jets	82	35	39	8	32	215	239	−24	78

Source: National Hockey League
x – Clinched playoff spot; z – Clinched conference

Western Conference Wild Card
Pos	Div	Team	GP	W	L	OTL	ROW	GF	GA	GD	Pts
1	CE	x – Nashville Predators	82	41	27	14	37	228	215	+13	96
2	CE	x – Minnesota Wild	82	38	33	11	35	216	206	+10	87
3	CE	Colorado Avalanche	82	39	39	4	35	216	240	−24	82
4	PA	Arizona Coyotes	82	35	39	8	34	209	245	−36	78
5	CE	Winnipeg Jets	82	35	39	8	32	215	239	−24	78
6	PA	Calgary Flames	82	35	40	7	33	231	260	−29	77
7	PA	Vancouver Canucks	82	31	38	13	26	191	243	−52	75
8	PA	Edmonton Oilers	82	31	43	8	27	203	245	−42	70

Source: National Hockey League
x – Clinched playoff spot

== Schedule and results ==
=== Pre-season ===
2015–16 preseason game log: 4–2–0 (Home: 2–1–0; Road: 2–1–0)
#	Date	Visitor	Score	Home	OT	Decision	Attendance	Record	Recap
1	September 21	Buffalo	3–2	Minnesota		Kuemper	17,217	0–1–0
2	September 22	Minnesota	1–0	Winnipeg	OT	Backstrom	15,294	1–1–0
3	September 24	Minnesota	5–2	Columbus		Dubnyk	10,209	2–1–0
4	September 26 (In Saskatoon, Saskatchewan)	Minnesota	0–3	Edmonton		Kuemper	7,541	2–2–0
5	September 27	Winnipeg	1–8	Minnesota		Dubnyk	17,710	3–2–0
6	October 1	Buffalo	1–6	Minnesota		Dubnyk	17,214	4–2–0

=== Regular season ===
2015–16 game log

October: 7–2–2 (Home: 5–0–0; Road: 2–2–2)
#	Date	Visitor	Score	Home	OT	Decision	Attendance	Record	Pts	Recap
1	October 8	Minnesota	5–4	Colorado		Dubnyk	18,007	1–0–0	2
2	October 10	St. Louis	2–3	Minnesota		Dubnyk	19,096	2–0–0	4
3	October 15	Minnesota	4–3	Arizona		Dubnyk	12,029	3–0–0	6
4	October 16	Minnesota	1–2	Los Angeles	OT	Kuemper	18,230	3–0–1	7
5	October 18	Minnesota	1–4	Anaheim		Dubnyk	16,784	3–1–1	7
6	October 22	Columbus	2–3	Minnesota		Dubnyk	18,650	4–1–1	9
7	October 24	Anaheim	0–3	Minnesota		Dubnyk	19,034	5–1–1	11
8	October 25	Minnesota	4–5	Winnipeg		Dubnyk	15,294	5–2–1	11
9	October 27	Edmonton	3–4	Minnesota		Dubnyk	18,936	6–2–1	13
10	October 30	Chicago	4–5	Minnesota		Dubnyk	19,140	7–2–1	15
11	October 31	Minnesota	2–3	St. Louis	OT	Dubnyk	17,728	7–2–2	16

November: 4–5–2 (Home: 3–3–1; Road: 1–2–1)
#	Date	Visitor	Score	Home	OT	Decision	Attendance	Record	Pts	Recap
12	November 5	Nashville	3–2	Minnesota		Dubnyk	19,024	7–3–2	16
13	November 7	Tampa Bay	0–1	Minnesota		Dubnyk	19,066	8–3–2	18
14	November 10	Winnipeg	3–5	Minnesota		Dubnyk	19,153	9–3–2	20
15	November 12	Minnesota	3–2	Carolina	OT	Dubnyk	9,511	10–3–2	22
16	November 14	Minnesota	2–3	Dallas	OT	Dubnyk	18,532	10–3–3	23
17	November 17	Minnesota	3–4	Pittsburgh		Dubnyk	18,495	10–4–3	23
18	November 19	Minnesota	2–4	Boston		Dubnyk	17,565	10–5–3	23
19	November 21	Nashville	0–4	Minnesota		Dubnyk	19,056	11–5–3	25
20	November 25	Vancouver	3–2	Minnesota		Dubnyk	18,877	11–6–3	25
21	November 27	Winnipeg	3–1	Minnesota		Dubnyk	19,055	11–7–3	25
22	November 28	Dallas	4–3	Minnesota	OT	Kuemper	19,024	11–7–4	26

December: 9–3–2 (Home: 6–2–0; Road: 3–1–2)
#	Date	Visitor	Score	Home	OT	Decision	Attendance	Record	Pts	Recap
23	December 1	Minnesota	2–1	Chicago		Dubnyk	21,580	12–7–4	28
24	December 3	Toronto	0–1	Minnesota		Dubnyk	18,880	13–7–4	30
25	December 5	Colorado	0–3	Minnesota		Kuemper	19,173	14–7–4	32
26	December 7	Minnesota	1–2	Colorado	OT	Kuemper	16,589	14–7–5	33
27	December 11	Minnesota	1–2	Arizona	OT	Kuemper	14,404	14–7–6	34
28	December 12	Minnesota	2–0	San Jose		Kuemper	16,766	15–7–6	36
29	December 15	Vancouver	2–6	Minnesota		Kuemper	18,804	16–7–6	38
30	December 17	NY Rangers	2–5	Minnesota		Dubnyk	19,090	17–7–6	40
31	December 19	Minnesota	2–3	Nashville		Dubnyk	17,117	17–8–6	40
32	December 21	Dallas	6–3	Minnesota		Dubnyk	19,047	17–9–6	40
33	December 22	Montreal	1–2	Minnesota		Kuemper	19,105	18–9–6	42
34	December 26	Pittsburgh	3–1	Minnesota		Dubnyk	19,234	18–10–6	42
35	December 28	Detroit	1–3	Minnesota		Dubnyk	19,110	19–10–6	44
36	December 31	Minnesota	3–1	St. Louis		Dubnyk	19,194	20–10–6	46

January: 3–7–3 (Home: 0–3–2; Road: 3–4–1)
#	Date	Visitor	Score	Home	OT	Decision	Attendance	Record	Pts	Recap
37	January 2	Minnesota	2–3	Tampa Bay	SO	Dubnyk	19,092	20–10–7	47
38	January 3	Minnesota	1–2	Florida		Dubnyk	15,426	20–11–7	47
39	January 5	Minnesota	4–2	Columbus		Dubnyk	12,411	21–11–7	49
40	January 7	Philadelphia	4–3	Minnesota	OT	Dubnyk	19,125	21–11–8	50
41	January 9	Minnesota	2–1	Dallas		Dubnyk	18,532	22–11–8	52
42	January 10	New Jersey	2–1	Minnesota		Kuemper	19,028	22–12–8	52
43	January 12	Buffalo	3–2	Minnesota		Dubnyk	19,034	22–13–8	52
44	January 15	Winnipeg	1–0	Minnesota		Dubnyk	19,222	22–14–8	52
45	January 16	Minnesota	0–3	Nashville		Dubnyk	17,302	22–15–8	52
46	January 20	Minnesota	1–3	Anaheim		Dubnyk	15,962	22–16–8	52
47	January 21	Minnesota	3–0	Los Angeles		Kuemper	18,230	23–16–8	54
48	January 23	Minnesota	3–4	San Jose		Kuemper	16,956	23–17–8	54
49	January 25	Arizona	2–1	Minnesota	SO	Dubnyk	19,020	23–17–9	55

February: 5–8–1 (Home: 2–3–1; Road: 3–5–0)
#	Date	Visitor	Score	Home	OT	Decision	Attendance	Record	Pts	Recap
50	February 2	Minnesota	3–5	NY Islanders		Dubnyk	13,331	23–18–9	55
51	February 4	Minnesota	2–4	NY Rangers		Dubnyk	18,006	23–19–9	55
52	February 6	Minnesota	1–4	St. Louis		Dubnyk	19,318	23–20–9	55
53	February 9	Dallas	4–3	Minnesota	OT	Kuemper	19,087	23–20–10	56
54	February 11	Washington	4–3	Minnesota		Dubnyk	19,213	23–21–10	56
55	February 13	Boston	4–2	Minnesota		Kuemper	19,191	23–22–10	56
56	February 15	Minnesota	5–2	Vancouver		Dubnyk	18,437	24–22–10	58
57	February 17	Minnesota	5–3	Calgary		Dubnyk	19,289	25–22–10	60
58	February 18	Minnesota	5–2	Edmonton		Kuemper	16,839	26–22–10	62
59	February 21 (2016 NHL Stadium Series)	Chicago	1–6	Minnesota (at TCF Bank Stadium)		Dubnyk	50,426	27–22–10	64
60	February 23	NY Islanders	4–1	Minnesota		Dubnyk	19,085	27–23–10	64
61	February 25	Minnesota	2–3	Philadelphia		Dubnyk	18,631	27–24–10	64
62	February 26	Minnesota	2–3	Washington		Kuemper	18,605	27–25–10	64
63	February 28	Florida	1–3	Minnesota		Dubnyk	19,093	28–25–10	66

March: 10–4–1 (Home: 5–3–0; Road: 5–1–1)
#	Date	Visitor	Score	Home	OT	Decision	Attendance	Record	Pts	Recap
64	March 1	Colorado	3–6	Minnesota		Dubnyk	19,107	29–25–10	68
65	March 3	Minnesota	2–1	Toronto		Dubnyk	18,915	30–25–10	70
66	March 5	Minnesota	3–2	Buffalo	SO	Dubnyk	19,070	31–25–10	72
67	March 6	St. Louis	4–2	Minnesota		Dubnyk	19,040	31–26–10	72
68	March 10	Edmonton	2–1	Minnesota		Kuemper	19,058	31–27–10	72
69	March 12	Minnesota	4–1	Montreal		Dubnyk	21,288	32–27–10	74
70	March 15	Minnesota	2–3	Ottawa	OT	Dubnyk	18,966	32–27–11	75
71	March 17	Minnesota	4–7	New Jersey		Kuemper	15,114	32–28–11	75
72	March 19	Carolina	2–3	Minnesota	SO	Dubnyk	19,044	33–28–11	77
73	March 20	Minnesota	3–2	Chicago	SO	Dubnyk	22,059	34–28–11	79
74	March 22	Los Angeles	1–2	Minnesota		Dubnyk	19,018	35–28–11	81
75	March 24	Calgary	2–6	Minnesota		Dubnyk	19,032	36–28–11	83
76	March 26	Minnesota	4–0	Colorado		Dubnyk	18,007	37–28–11	85
77	March 29	Chicago	1–4	Minnesota		Dubnyk	19,190	38–28–11	87
78	March 31	Ottawa	3–2	Minnesota		Dubnyk	19,032	38–29–11	87

April: 0–4–0 (Home: 0–2–0; Road: 0–2–0)
#	Date	Visitor	Score	Home	OT	Decision	Attendance	Record	Pts	Recap
79	April 1	Minnesota	2–3	Detroit		Dubnyk	20,027	38–30–11	87
80	April 3	Minnesota	1–5	Winnipeg		Dubnyk	15,294	38–31–11	87
81	April 5	San Jose	3–0	Minnesota		Dubnyk	19,061	38–32–11	87
82	April 9	Calgary	2–1	Minnesota		Kuemper	19,247	38–33–11	87

Legend: Win (2 points) Loss (0 points) Overtime/shootout loss (1 point)

=== Playoffs ===
2016 Stanley Cup playoffs

Western Conference first round vs. (C1) Dallas Stars: Dallas wins 4–2
#	Date	Visitor	Score	Home	OT	Decision	Attendance	Series	Recap
1	April 14	Minnesota	0–4	Dallas		Dubnyk	18,532	0–1	Recap
2	April 16	Minnesota	1–2	Dallas		Dubnyk	18,988	0–2	Recap
3	April 18	Dallas	3–5	Minnesota		Dubnyk	19,038	1–2	Recap
4	April 20	Dallas	3–2	Minnesota		Dubnyk	19,080	1–3	Recap
5	April 22	Minnesota	5–4	Dallas	OT	Dubnyk	18,889	2–3	Recap
6	April 24	Dallas	5–4	Minnesota		Dubnyk	19,310	2–4	Recap

Legend: Win Loss

== Player statistics ==
Final stats

=== Skaters ===
Regular season
Player	GP	G	A	Pts	+/−	PIM
Mikko Koivu	82	17	39	56	6	40
Zach Parise	70	25	28	53	−3	36
Ryan Suter	82	8	43	51	10	30
Mikael Granlund	82	13	31	44	−12	20
Nino Niederreiter	82	20	23	43	9	36
Charlie Coyle	82	21	21	42	1	16
Thomas Vanek	74	18	23	41	−10	22
Jason Pominville	75	11	25	36	10	12
Erik Haula	76	14	20	34	21	24
Jared Spurgeon	77	11	18	29	11	14
Mathew Dumba	81	10	16	26	1	38
Jason Zucker	71	13	10	23	−4	20
Marco Scandella	73	5	16	21	6	22
Justin Fontaine	60	5	11	16	3	20
Ryan Carter	60	7	5	12	−3	48
Chris Porter	61	4	3	7	−6	6
Jonas Brodin	68	2	5	7	−5	18
Mike Reilly	29	1	6	7	−4	8
Jarret Stoll^{†}	51	3	3	6	−4	16
Jordan Schroeder	26	2	2	4	2	2
Christian Folin	26	0	4	4	−1	11
David Jones^{†}	16	2	1	3	1	0
Nate Prosser	54	0	3	3	1	39
Zac Dalpe	2	1	0	1	0	0
Tyson Strachan	2	0	0	0	1	0
Brett Bulmer	3	0	0	0	−1	7
Tyler Graovac	2	0	0	0	−1	0
Kurtis Gabriel	3	0	0	0	1	10
Christoph Bertschy	3	0	0	0	0	0
Gustav Olofsson	2	0	0	0	0	0
Michael Keranen^{‡}	1	0	0	0	−1	0

Playoffs
Player	GP	G	A	Pts	+/−	PIM
Jason Pominville	6	4	3	7	0	6
Nino Niederreiter	6	1	5	6	1	4
Mikko Koivu	6	3	2	5	0	2
Jared Spurgeon	6	2	3	5	1	4
Erik Haula	5	1	3	4	0	2
Mikael Granlund	6	1	2	3	−2	0
Jonas Brodin	6	1	2	3	3	0
Ryan Suter	6	0	3	3	3	4
Charlie Coyle	6	1	1	2	−4	6
Jason Zucker	6	0	2	2	−4	2
Mathew Dumba	6	0	2	2	−2	6
Chris Porter	6	1	0	1	0	0
Marco Scandella	6	1	0	1	−7	4
Jordan Schroeder	2	1	0	1	−1	0
Nate Prosser	6	0	1	1	−6	0
David Jones	6	0	1	1	0	0
Jarret Stoll	4	0	0	0	−1	4
Ryan Carter	2	0	0	0	−1	10
Zac Dalpe	3	0	0	0	−1	0
Justin Fontaine	4	0	0	0	−1	0
Kurtis Gabriel	4	0	0	0	0	0

=== Goaltenders ===
Regular season
Player	GP	GS	TOI	W	L	OT	GA	GAA	SA	SV%	SO	G	A	PIM
Devan Dubnyk	67	66	3861	32	26	6	150	2.33	1829	.918	5	0	0	8
Darcy Kuemper	21	16	1063	6	7	5	43	2.43	507	.915	2	0	0	2

Playoffs
Player	GP	GS	TOI	W	L	GA	GAA	SA	SV%	SO	G	A	PIM
Devan Dubnyk	6	6	359	2	4	20	3.34	163	.877	0	0	0	0

^{†}Denotes player spent time with another team before joining the Wild. Stats reflect time with the Wild only.
^{‡}Traded mid-season

== Awards and honours ==
=== Awards ===
Regular season
Player	Award	Awarded
M. Koivu	NHL Third Star of the Week	December 21, 2015
D. Dubnyk	NHL All-Star game selection	January 6, 2016
Z. Parise	NHL First Star of the Week	March 28, 2016
D. Dubnyk	NHL Second Star of the Month	April 1, 2016

=== Milestones ===
Regular season
Player	Milestone	Reached
R. Suter	300th Career NHL Assist	October 8, 2015
Z. Parise	3rd Career NHL Hat Trick	October 8, 2015
J. Zucker	100th Career NHL Game	October 10, 2015
T. Vanek	300th Career NHL Goal	October 15, 2015
D. Dubnyk	100th Career NHL Win	October 15, 2015
J. Brodin	200th Career NHL Game	October 18, 2015
J. Spurgeon	300th Career NHL Game	October 18, 2015
Z. Parise	700th Career NHL Game	October 27, 2015
C. Coyle	200th Career NHL Game	October 31, 2015
C. Bertschy	1st Career NHL Game	November 7, 2015
M. Keranen	1st Career NHL Game	November 17, 2015
G. Olofsson	1st Career NHL Game	November 19, 2015
N. Prosser	200th Career NHL Game	November 19, 2015
M. Koivu	700th Career NHL Game	November 21, 2015
M. Granlund	100th Career NHL Point	November 25, 2015
C. Porter	200th Career NHL Game	December 11, 2015
M. Dumba	100th Career NHL Game	December 15, 2015
Z. Parise	300th Career NHL Assist	December 15, 2015
D. Dubnyk	100th Career NHL Loss	December 21, 2015
C. Coyle	100th Career NHL Point	January 2, 2016
Z. Parise	4th Career NHL Hat Trick	January 5, 2016
M. Reilly	1st Career NHL Game	January 9, 2016
M. Granlund	200th Career NHL Game	January 10, 2016
J. Pominville	800th Career NHL Game	January 23, 2016
J. Pominville	600th Career NHL Point	February 2, 2016
N. Niederreiter	100th Career NHL Point	February 2, 2016
R. Suter	800th Career NHL Game	February 4, 2016
M. Reilly	1st Career NHL Goal; 1st Career NHL Point	February 13, 2016
Z. Parise	600th Career NHL Point	February 17, 2016
T. Vanek	800th Career NHL Game	February 18, 2016
M. Reilly	1st Career NHL Assist	February 18, 2016
J. Schroeder	100th Career NHL Game	March 19, 2016
Z. Parise	5th Career NHL Hat Trick	March 24, 2016
N. Niederreiter	300th Career NHL Game	March 24, 2016
M. Granlund	100th Career NHL Assist	March 26, 2016
R. Suter	400th Career NHL Point	March 26, 2016
M. Scandella	300th Career NHL Game	April 3, 2016

Playoffs
Player	Milestone	Reached
Z. Dalpe	1st Career Playoff Game	April 14, 2016
K. Gabriel	1st Career Playoff Game	April 18, 2016
J. Schroeder	1st Career Playoff Goal; 1st Career Playoff Point	April 22, 2016

== Transactions ==
The Wild have been involved in the following transactions during the 2015–16 season.

=== Trades ===
Date	Details		Ref
June 27, 2015	To Boston Bruins 5th-round pick in 2016	To Minnesota Wild 5th-round pick in 2015
February 29, 2016	To Calgary Flames Niklas Backstrom; 6th-round pick in 2016	To Minnesota Wild David Jones
February 29, 2016	To Ottawa Senators Michael Keranen	To Minnesota Wild Conor Allen
February 29, 2016	To Los Angeles Kings Brett Sutter	To Minnesota Wild Scott Sabourin

=== Free agents acquired ===
Date	Player	Former team	Contract terms (in U.S. dollars)	Ref
July 1, 2015	Mike Reilly	Columbus Blue Jackets	2 years, entry-level contract	
July 1, 2015	Zac Dalpe	Buffalo Sabres	1 year, $600,000	
July 1, 2015	Ruslan Fedotenko	Iowa Wild	1 year, $600,000	
July 1, 2015	Marc Hagel	Iowa Wild	2 years, $1.21 million	
July 2, 2015	Tyson Strachan	Buffalo Sabres	1 year, $650,000	
July 2, 2015	Jared Knight	Iowa Wild	1 year, $761,250	
March 26, 2016	Nick Seeler	University of Minnesota	2 years, entry-level contract	
March 27, 2016	Mario Lucia	University of Notre Dame	2 years, entry-level contract	
April 15, 2016	Sam Anas	Quinnipiac University	2 years, entry-level contract	
May 17, 2016	Adam Vay	Debreceni Hoki Klub	2 years, entry-level contract	

=== Free agents lost ===
Date	Player	New team	Contract terms (in U.S. dollars)	Ref
July 2, 2015	Kyle Brodziak	St. Louis Blues	1 year, $900,000	
July 12, 2015	Chris Stewart	Anaheim Ducks	1 year, $1.7 million	

=== Claimed via waivers ===
Player	Former team	Date claimed off waivers	Ref
Chris Porter	Philadelphia Flyers	October 1, 2015	
Jarret Stoll	New York Rangers	December 15, 2015	

=== Player signings ===
Date	Player	Contract terms (in U.S. dollars)	Ref
July 1, 2015	Mikael Granlund	2 years, $6 million	
July 1, 2015	Nate Prosser	2 years, $1.25 million	
July 1, 2015	Ryan Carter	1 year, $625,000	
July 1, 2015	Steve Michalek	2 years, entry-level contract	
July 4, 2015	Devan Dubnyk	6 years, $26 million	
July 11, 2015	Christian Folin	2 years, $1.45 million	
July 13, 2015	Joel Eriksson Ek	3 years, entry-level contract	
August 2, 2015	Erik Haula	2 years, $2 million	
August 16, 2015	Brett Bulmer	1 year, $600,000	
December 21, 2015	Jared Spurgeon	4 years, $20.75 million (extension)	
April 11, 2016	Adam Gilmour	2 years, entry-level contract	
April 13, 2016	Alex Tuch	3 years, entry-level contract	
May 24, 2016	Chase Lang	3 years, entry-level contract	

== Draft picks ==
Below are the Minnesota Wild's selections at the 2015 NHL entry draft, to be held on June 26–27, 2015 at the BB&T Center in Sunrise, Florida.

Round	#	Player	Pos	Nationality	College/Junior/Club team (League)
1	20	Joel Eriksson Ek	C	Sweden	Farjestad BK
2	50	Jordan Greenway	LW	United States	USA U-18
4	111	Ales Stezka	G	Czech Republic	HC Bílí Tygři Liberec
5	135	Kirill Kaprizov	LW	Russia	Metallurg Novokuznetsk
6	171	Nicholas Boka	D	United States	USA U-18
7	201	Gustav Bouramman	D	Sweden	Sault Ste. Marie Greyhounds
7	204^{[a]}	Jack Sadek	D	United States	Lakeville North High School

Draft notes

- The Minnesota Wild's third-round pick went to the Arizona Coyotes as the result of a trade on January 14, 2015 that sent Devan Dubnyk to Minnesota in exchange for this pick.
- The Boston Bruins' fifth-round pick went to the Minnesota Wild as the result of a trade on June 27, 2015 that sent a fifth-round pick in 2016 to Boston in exchange for this pick.
- The Minnesota Wild's fifth-round pick went to the Columbus Blue Jackets as the result of a trade on March 2, 2015 that sent Jordan Leopold to Minnesota in exchange for Justin Falk and this pick.
- ^{a} The Vancouver Canucks' seventh-round pick went to the Minnesota Wild as the result of a trade on June 28, 2014 that sent a third-round pick in 2014 to Tampa Bay in exchange for a third-round pick in 2014 and this pick. Tampa Bay previously acquired this pick as the result of a trade on June 27, 2014 that sent a second-round pick in 2014 to Vancouver in exchange for Jason Garrison, the rights to Jeff Costello and this pick.
