= 2015–16 Los Angeles Kings season =

Season of play of professional ice hockey team

2015–16 Los Angeles Kings
- Division: 2nd Pacific
- Conference: 5th Western
- 2015–16 record: 48–28–6
- Home record: 26–12–3
- Road record: 22–16–3
- Goals for: 225
- Goals against: 195

Team information
- General manager: Dean Lombardi
- Coach: Darryl Sutter
- Captain: Dustin Brown
- Alternate captains: Matt Greene; Jeff Carter; Anze Kopitar
- Arena: Staples Center
- Average attendance: 18,230
- Minor league affiliates: Ontario Reign (AHL); Manchester Monarchs (ECHL)

Team leaders
- Goals: Tyler Toffoli (31)
- Assists: Anze Kopitar (49)
- Points: Anze Kopitar (74)
- Penalty minutes: Brayden McNabb (92)
- Plus/minus: Tyler Toffoli (+35)
- Wins: Jonathan Quick (40)
- Goals against average: Jhonas Enroth (2.17)

The 2015–16 Los Angeles Kings season was the 49th season (48th season of play) for the National Hockey League (NHL) franchise that was established on June 5, 1967. The season began on October 7, 2015, and ended on April 23, 2016, respectively, both against the San Jose Sharks.

== Off-season ==
On June 29, 2015, the Kings announced that they had terminated the contract of forward Mike Richards due to "a material breach of his Standard Player's Contract."

== Standings ==
Pacific Division
Pos	Team	GP	W	L	OTL	ROW	GF	GA	GD	Pts
1	y – Anaheim Ducks	82	46	25	11	43	218	192	+26	103
2	x – Los Angeles Kings	82	48	28	6	46	225	195	+30	102
3	x – San Jose Sharks	82	46	30	6	42	241	210	+31	98
4	Arizona Coyotes	82	35	39	8	34	209	245	−36	78
5	Calgary Flames	82	35	40	7	33	231	260	−29	77
6	Vancouver Canucks	82	31	38	13	26	191	243	−52	75
7	Edmonton Oilers	82	31	43	8	27	203	245	−42	70

Source: National Hockey League
x – Clinched playoff spot; y – Clinched division

== Schedule and results ==
=== Pre-season ===
preseason game log: 4–1–1 (Home: 2–0–1; Road: 2–1–0)
#	Date	Visitor	Score	Home	OT	Decision	Attendance	Record	Recap
1^{[a]}	September 21	Los Angeles	5–1	Arizona		Berube	––	1–0–0
2	September 22	Arizona	2–3	Los Angeles	OT	Budaj	12,996	2–0–0
3	September 25	Los Angeles	1–2	Anaheim		Quick	16,571	2–1–0
4	September 27	Los Angeles	2–1	Colorado	SO	Budaj	––	3–1–0
5	September 29	Anaheim	2–1	Los Angeles	OT	Enroth	17,915	3–1–1
6^{[b]}	October 3	Colorado	0–4	Los Angeles		Quick	––	4–1–1
Notes:^{a} Game will be played in Rabobank Arena in Bakersfield, California.^{b} Game will be played in MGM Grand Garden Arena in Paradise, Nevada.

=== Regular season ===
2015–16 Schedule

October: 7–3–0 (Home: 4–3–0; Road: 3–0–0)
#	Date	Visitor	Score	Home	OT	Decision	Attendance	Record	Pts	Recap
1	October 7	San Jose	5–1	Los Angeles		Quick	18,230	0–1–0	0
2	October 9	Arizona	4–1	Los Angeles		Quick	18,230	0–2–0	0
3	October 13	Vancouver	3–0	Los Angeles		Quick	18,230	0–3–0	0
4	October 16	Minnesota	1–2	Los Angeles	OT	Quick	18,230	1–3–0	2
5	October 18	Colorado	1–2	Los Angeles		Quick	18,230	2–3–0	4
6	October 22	Los Angeles	4–1	San Jose		Enroth	16,797	3–3–0	6
7	October 23	Carolina	0–3	Los Angeles		Quick	18,230	4–3–0	8
8	October 25	Los Angeles	3–2	Edmonton		Quick	16,839	5–3–0	10
9	October 27	Los Angeles	4–1	Winnipeg		Quick	15,294	6–3–0	12
10	October 31	Nashville	3–4	Los Angeles	OT	Quick	18,230	7–3–0	14

November: 7–5–1 (Home: 4–2–0; Road: 3–3–1)
#	Date	Visitor	Score	Home	OT	Decision	Attendance	Record	Pts	Recap
11	November 2	Los Angeles	2–4	Chicago		Quick	21,534	7–4–0	14
12	November 3	Los Angeles	3–0	St. Louis		Enroth	17,529	8–4–0	16
13	November 5	Columbus	3–2	Los Angeles		Quick	18,230	8–5–0	16
14	November 7	Florida	1–4	Los Angeles		Quick	18,230	9–5–0	18
15	November 10	Arizona	3–2	Los Angeles		Quick	18,230	9–6–0	18
16	November 12	NY Islanders	1–2	Los Angeles		Enroth	18,230	10–6–0	20
17	November 14	Edmonton	3–4	Los Angeles		Quick	18,230	11–6–0	22
18	November 17	Los Angeles	3–2	Philadelphia	SO	Quick	18,846	12–6–0	24
19	November 20	Los Angeles	2–3	Detroit		Enroth	20,027	12–7–0	24
20	November 22	Los Angeles	3–4	Carolina		Quick	10,154	12–8–0	24
21	November 23	Los Angeles	3–1	Florida		Quick	10,997	13–8–0	26
22	November 25	Los Angeles	1–2	Tampa Bay	SO	Quick	19,092	13–8–1	27
23	November 28	Chicago	2–3	Los Angeles	OT	Quick	18,230	14–8–1	29

December: 10–3–1 (Home: 3–1–0; Road: 7–2–1)
#	Date	Visitor	Score	Home	OT	Decision	Attendance	Record	Pts	Recap
24	December 1	Vancouver	1–2	Los Angeles	OT	Quick	18,230	15–8–1	31
25	December 5	Pittsburgh	3–5	Los Angeles		Quick	18,230	16–8–1	33
26	December 6	Tampa Bay	1–3	Los Angeles		Quick	18,230	17–8–1	35
27	December 8	Los Angeles	3–2	Columbus	OT	Quick	15,633	18–8–1	37
28	December 11	Los Angeles	3–2	Pittsburgh	SO	Quick	18,489	19–8–1	39
29	December 12	Los Angeles	1–2	Buffalo	OT	Enroth	18,133	19–8–2	40
30	December 14	Los Angeles	3–5	Ottawa		Quick	17,829	19–9–2	40
31	December 17	Los Angeles	3–0	Montreal		Quick	21,288	20–9–2	42
32	December 19	Los Angeles	0–5	Toronto		Enroth	19,362	20–10–2	42
33	December 22	San Jose	5–3	Los Angeles		Quick	18,493	20–11–2	42
34	December 26	Los Angeles	4–3	Arizona	OT	Quick	15,277	21–11–2	44
35	December 28	Los Angeles	5–0	Vancouver		Quick	18,570	22–11–2	46
36	December 29	Los Angeles	5–2	Edmonton		Quick	16,839	23–11–2	48
37	December 31	Los Angeles	4–1	Calgary		Quick	19,289	24–11–2	50

January: 6–5–1 (Home: 4–3–1; Road: 2–2–0)
#	Date	Visitor	Score	Home	OT	Decision	Attendance	Record	Pts	Recap
38	January 2	Philadelphia	1–2	Los Angeles		Quick	18,230	25–11–2	52
39	January 4	Los Angeles	1–4	Colorado		Enroth	15,202	25–12–2	52
40	January 7	Toronto	1–2	Los Angeles		Quick	18,230	26–12–2	54
41	January 9	St. Louis	2–1	Los Angeles	SO	Quick	18,413	26–12–3	55
42	January 11	Detroit	2–4	Los Angeles		Quick	18,230	27–12–3	57
43	January 16	Ottawa	5–3	Los Angeles		Quick	18,230	27–13–3	57
44	January 17	Los Angeles	3–2	Anaheim		Quick	17,227	28–13–3	59
45	January 19	Dallas	2–3	Los Angeles		Quick	18,230	29–13–3	61
46	January 21	Minnesota	3–0	Los Angeles		Quick	18,230	29–14–3	61
47	January 23	Los Angeles	2–3	Arizona		Quick	14,195	29–15–3	61
48	January 24	Los Angeles	3–2	San Jose	OT	Enroth	17,562	30–15–3	63
49	January 27	Colorado	4–3	Los Angeles		Quick	18,230	30–16–3	63

February: 7–5–1 (Home: 3–1–0; Road: 4–4–1)
#	Date	Visitor	Score	Home	OT	Decision	Attendance	Record	Pts	Recap
50	February 2	Los Angeles	6–2	Arizona		Quick	12,261	31–16–3	65
51	February 4	Anaheim	4–2	Los Angeles		Quick	18,230	31–17–3	65
52	February 9	Los Angeles	9–2	Boston		Quick	17,565	32–17–3	67
53	February 11	Los Angeles	2–5	NY Islanders		Enroth	13,643	32–18–3	67
54	February 12	Los Angeles	5–4	NY Rangers	OT	Budaj	18,006	33–18–3	69
55	February 14	Los Angeles	0–1	New Jersey		Enroth	16,514	33–19–3	69
56	February 16	Los Angeles	1–3	Washington		Quick	18,506	33–20–3	69
57	February 18	Los Angeles	1–2	St. Louis	OT	Quick	18,923	33–20–4	70
58	February 20	Los Angeles	2–1	Nashville	OT	Quick	17,369	34–20–4	72
59	February 23	Calgary	1–2	Los Angeles		Quick	18,230	35–20–4	74
60	February 25	Edmonton	1–2	Los Angeles		Quick	18,230	36–20–4	76
61	February 27	Buffalo	0–2	Los Angeles		Enroth	18,230	37–20–4	78
62	February 28	Los Angeles	2–4	Anaheim		Quick	17,174	37–21–4	78

March: 9–5–1 (Home: 7–1–1; Road: 2–4–0)
#	Date	Visitor	Score	Home	OT	Decision	Attendance	Record	Pts	Recap
63	March 3	Montreal	2–3	Los Angeles		Quick	18,230	38–21–4	80
64	March 5	Anaheim	3–2	Los Angeles		Quick	18,230	38–22–4	80
65	March 7	Vancouver	1–5	Los Angeles		Quick	18,230	39–22–4	82
66	March 9	Washington	3–4	Los Angeles	OT	Quick	18,324	40–22–4	84
67	March 12	New Jersey	2–1	Los Angeles	OT	Quick	18,412	40–22–5	85
68	March 14	Los Angeles	5–0	Chicago		Quick	22,170	41–22–5	87
69	March 15	Los Angeles	5–2	Dallas		Enroth	18,532	42–22–5	89
70	March 17	NY Rangers	3–4	Los Angeles	OT	Quick	18,230	43–22–5	91
71	March 19	Boston	1–2	Los Angeles		Quick	18,373	44–22–5	93
72	March 21	Los Angeles	2–5	Nashville		Quick	17,113	44–23–5	93
73	March 22	Los Angeles	1–2	Minnesota		Quick	19,018	44–24–5	93
74	March 24	Los Angeles	1–4	Winnipeg		Quick	15,294	44–25–5	93
75	March 26	Edmonton	4–6	Los Angeles		Quick	18,230	45–25–5	95
76	March 28	Los Angeles	2–5	San Jose		Quick	17,066	45–26–5	95
77	March 31	Calgary	0–3	Los Angeles		Quick	18,417	46–26–5	97

April: 2–2–1 (Home: 1–1–1; Road: 1–1–0)
#	Date	Visitor	Score	Home	OT	Decision	Attendance	Record	Pts	Recap
78	April 2	Dallas	3–2	Los Angeles		Quick	18,230	46–27–5	97
79	April 4	Los Angeles	2–3	Vancouver		Quick	18,415	46–28–5	97
80	April 5	Los Angeles	5–4	Calgary	OT	Enroth	18,438	47–28–5	99
81	April 7	Anaheim	1–2	Los Angeles		Quick	18,511	48–28–5	101
82	April 9	Winnipeg	4–3	Los Angeles	SO	Quick	18,449	48–28–6	102

Legend: Win (2 points) Loss (0 points) Overtime/shootout loss (1 point)

== Playoffs ==
2016 Stanley Cup playoffs

Western Conference First Round vs. (P3) San Jose Sharks: San Jose won 4–1
#	Date	Visitor	Score	Home	OT	Decision	Attendance	Series	Recap
1	April 14	San Jose	4–3	Los Angeles		Quick	18,230	0–1	Recap
2	April 16	San Jose	2–1	Los Angeles		Quick	18,514	0–2	Recap
3	April 18	Los Angeles	2–1	San Jose	OT	Quick	17,562	1–2	Recap
4	April 20	Los Angeles	2–3	San Jose		Quick	17,562	1–3	Recap
5	April 22	San Jose	6–3	Los Angeles		Quick	18,543	1–4	Recap

Legend: Win Loss

== Player statistics ==
Final stats

=== Skaters ===
Regular season
Player	GP	G	A	Pts	+/−	PIM
Anze Kopitar	81	25	49	74	34	16
Jeff Carter	77	24	38	62	18	20
Tyler Toffoli	82	31	27	58	35	20
Milan Lucic	81	20	35	55	26	79
Drew Doughty	82	14	37	51	24	52
Jake Muzzin	82	8	32	40	7	64
Tanner Pearson	79	15	21	36	11	18
Alec Martinez	78	10	21	31	16	40
Dustin Brown	82	11	17	28	−5	30
Marian Gaborik	54	12	10	22	−6	20
Vincent Lecavalier^{†}	42	10	7	17	1	20
Trevor Lewis	75	8	8	16	−10	20
Brayden McNabb	81	2	12	14	11	92
Dwight King	47	7	6	13	−6	24
Luke Schenn^{†}	43	2	9	11	5	52
Andy Andreoff	60	8	2	10	1	76
Nick Shore	68	3	7	10	−10	32
Christian Ehrhoff^{‡}	40	2	8	10	−10	32
Kyle Clifford	56	3	6	9	−1	55
Jamie McBain	44	2	7	9	2	6
Rob Scuderi^{†}	21	0	6	6	9	2
Kris Versteeg^{†}	14	4	1	5	6	9
Jordan Nolan	52	0	5	5	0	38
Michael Mersch	17	1	2	3	1	0
Derek Forbort	14	1	1	2	−1	17
Matt Greene	3	0	0	0	0	8
Jeff Schultz	1	0	0	0	−1	0
Nic Dowd	5	0	0	0	1	2
Kevin Gravel	5	0	0	0	0	0
Jordan Weal^{‡}	10	0	0	0	0	2

Playoffs
Player	GP	G	A	Pts	+/−	PIM
Jake Muzzin	5	1	4	5	1	2
Anze Kopitar	5	2	2	4	2	2
Tanner Pearson	5	1	2	3	−1	2
Milan Lucic	5	0	3	3	−2	4
Trevor Lewis	5	2	0	2	0	4
Jeff Carter	5	2	0	2	−5	4
Kris Versteeg	5	1	1	2	0	0
Vincent Lecavalier	5	1	1	2	0	2
Luke Schenn	5	1	1	2	1	6
Marian Gaborik	4	0	1	1	2	2
Dustin Brown	5	0	1	1	−2	4
Dwight King	5	0	1	1	1	2
Drew Doughty	5	0	1	1	−5	2
Kyle Clifford	4	0	1	1	1	0
Tyler Toffoli	5	0	1	1	−5	2
Rob Scuderi	5	0	0	0	0	2
Jamie McBain	4	0	0	0	0	2
Alec Martinez	1	0	0	0	0	0
Brayden McNabb	5	0	0	0	−4	2
Andy Andreoff	1	0	0	0	0	0
Nick Shore	1	0	0	0	−1	0

=== Goaltenders ===
Regular season
Player	GP	GS	TOI	W	L	OT	GA	GAA	SA	SV%	SO	G	A	PIM
Jonathan Quick	68	68	4,034	40	23	5	149	2.22	1820	.918	5	0	3	10
Jhonas Enroth	16	13	856	7	5	1	31	2.17	398	.922	2	0	0	0
Peter Budaj	1	1	62	1	0	0	4	3.87	28	.857	0	0	0	0

Playoffs
Player	GP	GS	TOI	W	L	GA	GAA	SA	SV%	SO	G	A	PIM
Jonathan Quick	5	5	296	1	4	15	3.04	132	.886	0	0	0	0

^{†}Denotes player spent time with another team before joining the Kings. Stats reflect time with the Kings only.
^{‡}Traded mid-season. Stats reflect time with the Kings only.
Bold/italics denotes franchise record

== Notable achievements ==
=== Awards ===
Regular season
Player	Award	Awarded
J. Quick	NHL Third Star of the Week	October 26, 2015
J. Quick	NHL First Star of the Week	January 4, 2016
D. Doughty	NHL All-Star game selection	January 6, 2016
J. Quick	NHL All-Star game selection	January 6, 2016
A. Kopitar	NHL Third Star of the Week	January 18, 2016

=== Milestones ===
Regular season
Player	Milestone	Reached
J. Weal	1st career NHL game	October 9, 2015

== Transactions ==
The Kings have been involved in the following transactions during the 2015–16 season:

=== Trades ===
Date	Details		Ref
June 26, 2015	To Boston Bruins Martin Jones; Colin Miller; 1st-round pick in 2015	To Los Angeles Kings Milan Lucic
June 27, 2015	To Philadelphia Flyers 4th-round pick in 2015; 6th-round pick in 2016	To Los Angeles Kings CBJ's 4th-round pick in 2015
October 6, 2015	To New Jersey Devils Brian O'Neill	To Los Angeles Kings Conditional 7th-round pick in 2017
January 6, 2016	To Philadelphia Flyers Jordan Weal; 3rd-round pick in 2016	To Los Angeles Kings Vincent Lecavalier^{[Note 1]} Luke Schenn^{[Note 2]}
February 26, 2016	To Chicago Blackhawks Christian Ehrhoff^{Note 3}	To Los Angeles Kings Rob Scuderi^{Note 4}
February 28, 2016	To Carolina Hurricanes Valentin Zykov conditional 5th-round pick in 2016	To Los Angeles Kings Kris Versteeg
February 29, 2016	To Minnesota Wild Scott Sabourin	To Los Angeles Kings Brett Sutter

Notes

- ^{Note 1} Philadelphia to retain 50% ($2.25 million) of salary as part of trade.
- ^{Note 2} Philadelphia to retain 50% ($1.8 million) of salary as part of trade.
- ^{Note 3} Los Angeles to retain 15% ($225,000) of salary as part of trade.
- ^{Note 4} Chicago to retain 50% ($1.125 million) of salary as part of trade.

=== Free agents acquired ===
Date	Player	Former team	Contract terms (in U.S. dollars)	Ref
July 1, 2015	Jhonas Enroth	Dallas Stars	1 year, $1.25 million	
August 23, 2015	Christian Ehrhoff	Pittsburgh Penguins	1 year, $1.5 million	
August 27, 2015	Damir Sharipzyanov	Owen Sound Attack	3 years, entry-level contract	
October 9, 2015	Peter Budaj	St. John's IceCaps	1 year, $575,000	

=== Free agents lost ===
Date	Player	New team	Contract terms (in U.S. dollars)	Ref
July 1, 2015	Andrej Sekera	Edmonton Oilers	6 years, $33 million	
July 1, 2015	Justin Williams	Washington Capitals	2 years, $6.5 million	
July 2, 2015	Andrew Bodnarchuk	Columbus Blue Jackets	1 year, $650,000	
August 10, 2015	Jarret Stoll	New York Rangers	1 year, $800,000	
January 6, 2016	Mike Richards	Washington Capitals	1 year, $1 million	

=== Claimed via waivers ===
Player	Previous team	Date	Ref

=== Lost via waivers ===
Player	New team	Date claimed off waivers	Ref
Jean-Francois Berube	New York Islanders	October 6, 2015	

=== Lost via retirement ===
Player	Ref

=== Player signings ===
Date	Player	Contract terms (in U.S. dollars)	Ref
June 26, 2015	Tyler Toffoli	2 years, $6.5 million	
July 1, 2015	Kevin Gravel	2 years, $1.85 million	
July 5, 2015	Jamie McBain	1 year, $600,000	
July 14, 2015	Erik Cernak	3 years, entry-level contract	
July 15, 2015	Andy Andreoff	2 years, $1.175 million	
July 16, 2015	Nick Shore	2 years, $1.2 million	
July 16, 2015	Jordan Weal	1 year, $632,500	
July 16, 2015	Nic Dowd	1 year, $600,000	
July 16, 2015	Andrew Crescenzi	1 year, $605,000	
July 16, 2015	Vincent LoVerde	2 years, $1.15 million	
August 10, 2015	Joel Lowry	2 years, entry-level contract	
March 2, 2016	Peter Budaj	1 year, contract extension	
June 4, 2016	Brayden McNabb	2 years	

== Draft picks ==
Below are the Los Angeles Kings' selections at the 2015 NHL entry draft, to be held on June 26–27, 2015, at the BB&T Center in Sunrise, Florida.

Round	#	Player	Pos	Nationality	College/Junior/Club team (League)
2	43^{[a]}	Erik Cernak	D	Slovakia	HC Kosice (Slovak Extraliga)
3	74	Alexander Dergachyov	C	Russia	SKA Saint Petersburg (Russia Jr.)
4	99^{[b]}	Austin Wagner	LW	Canada	Regina Pats (WHL)
5	134	Matt Schmalz	RW	Canada	Sudbury Wolves (OHL)
7	187^{[c]}	Chaz Reddekopp	D	Canada	Victoria Royals (WHL)
7	194	Matt Roy	LW	Canada	Michigan Tech University (WCHA)

Draft notes

- The Los Angeles Kings' first-round pick went to the Boston Bruins as the result of a trade on June 26, 2015, that sent Milan Lucic to Los Angeles in exchange for Martin Jones, Colin Miller and this pick.
- ^{a} The Los Angeles Kings' second-round pick was re-acquired as the result of a trade on March 5, 2014, that sent Hudson Fasching and Nicolas Deslauriers to Buffalo in exchange for Brayden McNabb, Jonathan Parker, Los Angeles' second-round pick in 2014 and this pick. Buffalo previously acquired this pick as the result of a trade on April 1, 2013, that sent Robyn Regehr to Los Angeles in exchange for a second-round pick in 2014 and this pick.
- ^{b} The Columbus Blue Jackets' fourth-round pick went to the Los Angeles Kings as the result of a trade on June 27, 2015, that sent a fourth-round pick in 2015 (104th overall) and a sixth-round pick in 2016 to Philadelphia in exchange for this pick.

Philadelphia previously acquired this pick as the result of a trade on June 23, 2014 that sent Scott Hartnell to Columbus in exchange for R.J. Umberger and this pick.

- The Los Angeles Kings' fourth-round pick went to the Philadelphia Flyers as the result of a trade on June 27, 2015, that sent Columbus' fourth-round pick in 2015 to Los Angeles in exchange for a sixth-round pick in 2016 and this pick.
- The Los Angeles Kings' sixth-round pick went to the Chicago Blackhawks as the result of a trade on July 16, 2013, that sent Daniel Carcillo to Los Angeles in exchange for this pick (being conditional at the time of the trade). The condition – Chicago will receive a sixth-round pick in 2015 if Carcillo plays less than 40 games with Los Angeles during the 2013–14 NHL season – was converted on January 4, 2014, when Carcillo was traded to the New York Rangers after playing only 26 games with the Kings.
- ^{c} The New Jersey Devils' seventh-round pick went to the Los Angeles Kings as the result of a trade on June 30, 2013, that sent a seventh-round pick in 2013 to New Jersey in exchange for this pick.
