= 2015–16 New Jersey Devils season =

National Hockey League season

2015–16 New Jersey Devils
- Division: 7th Metropolitan
- Conference: 12th Eastern
- 2015–16 record: 38–36–8
- Home record: 19–17–5
- Road record: 19–19–3
- Goals for: 184
- Goals against: 208

Team information
- General manager: Ray Shero
- Coach: John Hynes
- Captain: Andy Greene
- Alternate captains: Michael Cammalleri; Patrik Elias; Adam Henrique; Travis Zajac
- Arena: Prudential Center
- Average attendance: 15,073
- Minor league affiliate: Albany Devils (AHL)

Team leaders
- Goals: Adam Henrique; Kyle Palmieri (30)
- Assists: Travis Zajac (28)
- Points: Kyle Palmieri (57)
- Penalty minutes: Jordin Tootoo (102)
- Plus/minus: Michael Cammalleri; Adam Larsson (+15)
- Wins: Cory Schneider (27)
- Goals against average: Scott Wedgewood (1.24)

The 2015–16 New Jersey Devils season was the 42nd season for the National Hockey League (NHL) franchise that was established on June 11, 1974, and 34th season since the franchise relocated from Colorado prior to the 1982–83 NHL season. The team's regular season began on October 9, 2015, against the Winnipeg Jets. The Devils once again missed the playoffs.

== Standings ==
Metropolitan Division
Pos	Team	GP	W	L	OTL	ROW	GF	GA	GD	Pts
1	p – Washington Capitals	82	56	18	8	52	252	193	+59	120
2	x – Pittsburgh Penguins	82	48	26	8	44	245	203	+42	104
3	x – New York Rangers	82	46	27	9	43	236	217	+19	101
4	x – New York Islanders	82	45	27	10	40	232	216	+16	100
5	x – Philadelphia Flyers	82	41	27	14	38	214	218	−4	96
6	Carolina Hurricanes	82	35	31	16	33	198	226	−28	86
7	New Jersey Devils	82	38	36	8	36	184	208	−24	84
8	Columbus Blue Jackets	82	34	40	8	28	219	252	−33	76

Source: National Hockey League
p – Clinched Presidents' Trophy; x – Clinched playoff spot

Eastern Conference Wild Card
Pos	Div	Team	GP	W	L	OTL	ROW	GF	GA	GD	Pts
1	ME	x – New York Islanders	82	45	27	10	40	232	216	+16	100
2	ME	x – Philadelphia Flyers	82	41	27	14	38	214	218	−4	96
3	AT	Boston Bruins	82	42	31	9	38	240	230	+10	93
4	ME	Carolina Hurricanes	82	35	31	16	33	198	226	−28	86
5	AT	Ottawa Senators	82	38	35	9	32	236	247	−11	85
6	ME	New Jersey Devils	82	38	36	8	36	184	208	−24	84
7	AT	Montreal Canadiens	82	38	38	6	33	221	236	−15	82
8	AT	Buffalo Sabres	82	35	36	11	33	201	222	−21	81
9	ME	Columbus Blue Jackets	82	34	40	8	28	219	252	−33	76
10	AT	Toronto Maple Leafs	82	29	42	11	23	198	246	−48	69

Source: National Hockey League
x – Clinched playoff spot

== Schedule and results ==
=== Pre-season ===
2015 preseason game log: 3–4–0 (Home: 2–1–0; Road: 1–3–0)
#	Date	Visitor	Score	Home	OT	Decision	Attendance	Record	Recap
1^{[a]}	September 20	New Jersey	0–2	Boston		Kinkaid	––	0–1–0	Recap
2	September 21	New Jersey	3–6	NY Rangers		Schneider	18,006	0–2–0	Recap
3	September 23	New Jersey	1–2	NY Islanders		Schneider	7,046	0–3–0	Recap
4	September 25	NY Islanders	2–4	New Jersey		Kinkaid	8,871	1–3–0	Recap
5	September 26	NY Rangers	4–3	New Jersey		Schneider	12,137	1–4–0	Recap
6	September 30	New Jersey	4–2	Philadelphia		Kinkaid	17,732	2–4–0	Recap
7	October 2	Philadelphia	2–3	New Jersey	SO	Schneider	9,235	3–4–0	Recap
Notes:^{a} Game was played at Dunkin' Donuts Center in Providence, Rhode Island.

=== Regular season ===
2015–16 Game Log

October: 6–4–1 (Home: 2–3–1; Road: 4–1–0)
#	Date	Visitor	Score	Home	OT	Decision	Attendance	Record	Pts	Recap
1	October 9	Winnipeg	3–1	New Jersey		Schneider	14,579	0–1–0	0	Recap
2	October 10	New Jersey	3–5	Washington		Kinkaid	18,506	0–2–0	0	Recap
3	October 13	Nashville	3–1	New Jersey		Kinkaid	11,117	0–3–0	0	Recap
4	October 16	San Jose	2–1	New Jersey	SO	Schneider	12,464	0–3–1	1	Recap
5	October 18	New Jersey	2–1	NY Rangers	OT	Schneider	18,006	1–3–1	3	Recap
6	October 20	Arizona	2–3	New Jersey	OT	Schneider	12,171	2–3–1	5	Recap
7	October 22	New Jersey	5–4	Ottawa	SO	Schneider	16,578	3–3–1	7	Recap
8	October 24	New Jersey	4–3	Buffalo		Schneider	18,040	4–3–1	9	Recap
9	October 27	Columbus	3–1	New Jersey		Schneider	12,847	4–4–1	9	Recap
10	October 29	New Jersey	4–1	Philadelphia		Schneider	19,241	5–4–1	11	Recap
11	October 31	NY Islanders	2–3	New Jersey	SO	Schneider	11,605	6–4–1	13	Recap

November: 6–5–1 (Home: 3–2–1; Road: 3–3–0)
#	Date	Visitor	Score	Home	OT	Decision	Attendance	Record	Pts	Recap
12	November 3	New Jersey	1–2	NY Islanders		Schneider	12,122	6–5–1	13	Recap
13	November 6	Chicago	2–4	New Jersey		Schneider	16,514	7–5–1	15	Recap
14	November 8	Vancouver	3–4	New Jersey	OT	Kinkaid	14,896	8–5–1	17	Recap
15	November 10	St. Louis	2–0	New Jersey		Schneider	13,310	8–6–1	17	Recap
16	November 12	New Jersey	3–2	Chicago		Schneider	21,568	9–6–1	19	Recap
17	November 14	Pittsburgh	0–4	New Jersey		Schneider	16,514	10–6–1	21	Recap
18	November 17	New Jersey	2–3	Calgary		Schneider	19,289	10–7–1	21	Recap
19	November 20	New Jersey	1–5	Edmonton		Kinkaid	16,839	10–8–1	21	Recap
20	November 22	New Jersey	3–2	Vancouver		Schneider	18,268	11–8–1	23	Recap
21	November 25	Columbus	2–1	New Jersey		Schneider	13,567	11–9–1	23	Recap
22	November 27	Montreal	3–2	New Jersey	SO	Schneider	16,514	11–9–2	24	Recap
23	November 28	New Jersey	3–2	Montreal	OT	Schneider	21,288	12–9–2	26	Recap

December: 7–5–3 (Home: 3–3–1; Road: 4–2–2)
#	Date	Visitor	Score	Home	OT	Decision	Attendance	Record	Pts	Recap
24	December 1	Colorado	2–1	New Jersey		Schneider	14,019	12–10–2	26	Recap
25	December 3	New Jersey	5–1	Carolina		Kinkaid	9,254	13–10–2	28	Recap
26	December 4	Philadelphia	4–3	New Jersey	OT	Schneider	14,825	13–10–3	29	Recap
27	December 6	Florida	2–4	New Jersey		Schneider	13,643	14–10–3	31	Recap
28	December 8	New Jersey	2–3	Toronto	SO	Schneider	19,043	14–10–4	32	Recap
29	December 11	Detroit	2–3	New Jersey	OT	Schneider	16,514	15–10–4	34	Recap
30	December 13	New Jersey	0–4	NY Islanders		Schneider	13,259	15–11–4	34	Recap
31	December 15	New Jersey	2–0	Buffalo		Schneider	18,297	16–11–4	36	Recap
32	December 17	Florida	5–1	New Jersey		Schneider	12,512	16–12–4	36	Recap
33	December 19	Anaheim	2–1	New Jersey		Kinkaid	16,514	16–13–4	36	Recap
34	December 20	New Jersey	1–2	Boston	SO	Schneider	17,565	16–13–5	37	Recap
35	December 22	New Jersey	4–3	Detroit		Schneider	20,027	17–13–5	39	Recap
36	December 26	New Jersey	1–3	Carolina		Schneider	11,654	17–14–5	39	Recap
37	December 29	Carolina	2–3	New Jersey		Kinkaid	16,514	18–14–5	41	Recap
38	December 30	New Jersey	3–0	Ottawa		Schneider	19,825	19–14–5	43	Recap

January: 6–6–0 (Home: 3–2–0; Road: 3–4–0)
#	Date	Visitor	Score	Home	OT	Decision	Attendance	Record	Pts	Recap
39	January 2	Dallas	2–3	New Jersey	OT	Schneider	16,514	20–14–5	45	Recap
40	January 4	Detroit	1–0	New Jersey		Schneider	15,547	20–15–5	45	Recap
41	January 6	New Jersey	1–2	Montreal		Schneider	21,288	20–16–5	45	Recap
42	January 8	Boston	4–1	New Jersey		Schneider	16,514	20–17–5	45	Recap
43	January 10	New Jersey	2–1	Minnesota		Schneider	19,028	21–17–5	47	Recap
44	January 12	New Jersey	2–5	St. Louis		Kinkaid	17,951	21–18–5	47	Recap
45	January 14	New Jersey	0–3	Colorado		Schneider	15,636	21–19–5	47	Recap
46	January 16	New Jersey	2–0	Arizona		Schneider	11,745	22–19–5	49	Recap
47	January 19	Calgary	2–4	New Jersey		Schneider	14,319	23–19–5	51	Recap
48	January 21	Ottawa	3–6	New Jersey		Schneider	14,772	24–19–5	53	Recap
49	January 23	New Jersey	3–1	Winnipeg		Schneider	15,294	25–19–5	55	Recap
50	January 26	New Jersey	0–2	Pittsburgh		Schneider	18,442	25–20–5	55	Recap

February: 5–6–2 (Home: 4–3–1; Road: 1–3–1)
#	Date	Visitor	Score	Home	OT	Decision	Attendance	Record	Pts	Recap
51	February 2	NY Rangers	2–3	New Jersey		Schneider	16,514	26–20–5	57	Recap
52	February 4	New Jersey	2–3	Toronto	SO	Kinkaid	18,947	26–20–6	58	Recap
53	February 6	Washington	3–2	New Jersey	SO	Schneider	16,514	26–20–7	59	Recap
54	February 8	New Jersey	1–2	NY Rangers		Schneider	18,006	26–21–7	59	Recap
55	February 9	Edmonton	1–2	New Jersey		Schneider	16,514	27–21–7	61	Recap
56	February 13	New Jersey	2–1	Philadelphia	OT	Schneider	19,775	28–21–7	63	Recap
57	February 14	Los Angeles	0–1	New Jersey		Kinkaid	16,514	29–21–7	65	Recap
58	February 16	Philadelphia	6–3	New Jersey		Schneider	15,482	29–22–7	65	Recap
59	February 19	NY Islanders	1–0	New Jersey		Schneider	16,514	29–23–7	65	Recap
60	February 20	New Jersey	3–4	Washington		Schneider	18,506	29–24–7	65	Recap
61	February 23	NY Rangers	2–5	New Jersey		Schneider	16,514	30–24–7	67	Recap
62	February 25	New Jersey	1–6	Columbus		Schneider	12,590	30–25–7	67	Recap
63	February 26	Tampa Bay	4–0	New Jersey		Schneider	15,968	30–26–7	67	Recap

March: 7–6–1 (Home: 3–2–1; Road: 4–4–0)
#	Date	Visitor	Score	Home	OT	Decision	Attendance	Record	Pts	Recap
64	March 1	Carolina	3–1	New Jersey		Schneider	14,251	30–27–7	67	Recap
65	March 3	New Jersey	5–4	Nashville	OT	Kinkaid	17,113	31–27–7	69	Recap
66	March 4	New Jersey	2–4	Dallas		Schneider	18,117	31–28–7	69	Recap
67	March 6	Pittsburgh	6–1	New Jersey		Kinkaid	15,856	31–29–7	69	Recap
68	March 10	New Jersey	3–0	San Jose		Kinkaid	16,234	32–29–7	71	Recap
69	March 12	New Jersey	2–1	Los Angeles	OT	Kinkaid	18,412	33–29–7	73	Recap
70	March 14	New Jersey	1–7	Anaheim		Kinkaid	15,423	33–30–7	73	Recap
71	March 17	Minnesota	4–7	New Jersey		Kinkaid	15,114	34–30–7	75	Recap
72	March 19	New Jersey	3–6	Columbus		Danis	14,447	34–31–7	75	Recap
73	March 20	Columbus	1–2	New Jersey		Wedgewood	15,146	35–31–7	77	Recap
74	March 24	New Jersey	3–0	Pittsburgh		Wedgewood	18,610	36–31–7	79	Recap
75	March 25	Washington	1–0	New Jersey	OT	Wedgewood	16,514	36–31–8	80	Recap
76	March 27	New Jersey	2–3	Carolina		Wedgewood	12,792	36–32–8	80	Recap
77	March 29	Boston	1–2	New Jersey		Kinkaid	15,486	37–32–8	82	Recap
78	March 31	New Jersey	2–3	Florida		Kinkaid	15,803	37–33–8	82	Recap

April: 1–3–0 (Home: 1–2–0; Road: 0–1–0)
#	Date	Visitor	Score	Home	OT	Decision	Attendance	Record	Pts	Recap
79	April 2	New Jersey	1–3	Tampa Bay		Schneider	19,092	37–34–8	82	Recap
80	April 5	Buffalo	3–1	New Jersey		Schneider	14,773	37–35–8	82	Recap
81	April 7	Tampa Bay	4–2	New Jersey		Kinkaid	15,536	37–36–8	82	Recap
82	April 9	Toronto	1–5	New Jersey		Schneider	16,514	38–36–8	84	Recap

Legend: Win (2 points) Loss (0 points) Overtime/shootout loss (1 point)

== Player statistics ==
Final stats

Skaters

Regular season
Player	GP	G	A	Pts	+/−	PIM
Kyle Palmieri	82	30	27	57	3	39
Adam Henrique	80	30	20	50	10	23
Travis Zajac	74	14	28	42	3	25
Lee Stempniak ^{‡}	63	16	25	41	3	34
Michael Cammalleri	42	14	24	38	15	18
Damon Severson	72	1	20	21	−8	32
Reid Boucher	39	8	11	19	−13	6
David Schlemko	67	6	13	19	−22	16
John Moore	73	4	15	19	−12	28
Adam Larsson	82	3	15	18	15	77
Joseph Blandisi	41	5	12	17	−14	34
Tyler Kennedy	50	3	13	16	−14	14
Sergey Kalinin	78	8	7	15	−9	33
Jacob Josefson	58	4	10	14	−21	20
Devante Smith-Pelly^{†}	18	8	5	13	−1	8
Andy Greene	82	4	9	13	7	26
Stephen Gionta	82	1	10	11	−13	43
Bobby Farnham	50	8	2	10	−2	92
Jordin Tootoo	66	4	5	9	−26	102
Patrik Elias	16	2	6	8	5	10
Eric Gelinas^{‡}	34	1	5	6	−8	16
Jon Merrill	47	1	4	5	−15	28
Mike Sislo	18	3	1	4	−2	4
Jiri Tlusty	30	2	2	4	−1	6
Blake Pietila	7	1	1	2	0	2
Brian O'Neill	22	0	2	2	−3	8
Pavel Zacha	1	0	2	2	4	0
Stefan Matteau^{‡}	20	1	0	1	−9	13
Tuomo Ruutu	33	0	1	1	−7	8
David Warsofsky	10	0	1	1	−3	2
Seth Helgeson	19	0	1	1	−5	17
Marc-Andre Gragnani	4	0	0	0	−2	2
Jim O'Brien	4	0	0	0	−4	2
Paul Thompson	3	0	0	0	0	2
Miles Wood	1	0	0	0	0	0
Steven Santini	1	0	0	0	2	2
Vojtech Mozik	7	0	0	0	0	4

Goaltenders

Regular season
Player	GP	GS	TOI	W	L	OT	GA	GAA	SA	SV%	SO	G	A	PIM
Cory Schneider	58	58	3,412	27	25	6	122	2.15	1597	0.924	4	0	0	0
Keith Kinkaid	23	20	1240	9	9	1	58	2.81	605	0.904	2	0	0	2
Scott Wedgewood	4	4	241	2	1	1	5	1.24	116	0.957	1	0	0	0
Yann Danis	2	0	51	0	1	0	4	4.71	18	0.778	0	0	0	0

^{†}Denotes player spent time with another team before joining the Devils. Stats reflect time with the Devils only.
^{‡}Denotes player was traded mid-season. Stats reflect time with the Devils only.
Bold/italics denotes franchise record.

=== Suspensions/fines ===
Player	Explanation	Length	Salary	Date issued
Jordin Tootoo	Dangerous trip on Nashville Predators defenseman Seth Jones during NHL Game No. 37 in Newark on Tuesday, October 13, 2015, at 7:55 of the third period.	—	$2,217.74	October 15, 2015
Stephen Gionta	Spearing Ottawa Senators defenseman Mark Borowiecki during NHL Game No. 94 in Ottawa on Thursday, October 22, 2015, at 18:18 of the second period.	—	$2,284.95	October 23, 2015
Bobby Farnham	Diving/Embellishment during NHL Game No. 553 in Ottawa on Wednesday, December 30, 2015.	—	$2,000.00	January 7, 2016
Bobby Farnham	Interference against St. Louis Blues forward Dmitrij Jaskin during NHL Game No. 636 in St. Louis on Tuesday, January 12, 2016, at 11:50 of the third period.	4 games	$12,365.60	January 13, 2016
Jordin Tootoo	Diving/Embellishment during NHL Game No. 583 in Detroit on Monday, January 4, 2016, at 9:39 of the third period.	—	$2,000.00	January 14, 2016

== Awards and honours ==
=== Awards ===
Regular season
Player	Award	Awarded
Mike Cammalleri	NHL Third Star of the Week	December 7, 2015
Cory Schneider	NHL All-Star game selection	January 6, 2016
Lee Stempniak	NHL Second Star of the Week	January 25, 2016

=== Milestones ===
Regular season
Player	Milestone	Reached
Sergei Kalinin	1st career NHL game	October 9, 2015
Brian O'Neill	1st career NHL game	October 10, 2015
Cory Schneider	100th career NHL win	October 22, 2015
Adam Larsson	200th career NHL game	October 24, 2015
Segei Kalinin	1st career NHL assist 1st career NHL point	October 24, 2015
Bobby Farnham	1st career NHL goal 1st career NHL assist 1st career NHL point	October 31, 2015
Stephen Gionta	200th career NHL game	November 3, 2015
Segei Kalinin	1st career NHL goal	November 8, 2015
Kyle Palmieri	100th career NHL point	November 8, 2015
Jacob Josefson	200th career NHL game	November 22, 2015
Tyler Kennedy	200th career NHL point	December 3, 2015

== Transactions ==
The Devils have been involved in the following transactions during the 2015–16 season.

=== Trades ===
Date	Details		Ref
June 27, 2015	To Anaheim Ducks FLA's 2nd-round pick in 2015; Conditional 3rd-round pick in 2016	To New Jersey Devils Kyle Palmieri
June 27, 2015	To Ottawa Senators 2nd-round pick in 2015	To New Jersey Devils DAL's 2nd-round pick in 2015; 4th-round pick in 2016
October 6, 2015	To Los Angeles Kings Conditional 7th-round pick in 2017	To New Jersey Devils Brian O'Neill
February 29, 2016	To Boston Bruins Lee Stempniak	To New Jersey Devils 4th-round pick in 2016; 2nd-round pick in 2017
February 29, 2016	To Colorado Avalanche Eric Gelinas	To New Jersey Devils 3rd-round pick in 2017
February 29, 2016	To Montreal Canadiens Stefan Matteau	To New Jersey Devils Devante Smith-Pelly
June 10, 2016	To Florida Panthers Graham Black; Paul Thompson	To New Jersey Devils Marc Savard; 2nd-round pick in 2018

=== Free agents acquired ===
Date	Player	Former team	Contract terms (in U.S. dollars)	Ref
July 1, 2015	John Moore	Arizona Coyotes	3 years, $5 million	
July 1, 2015	Paul Thompson	Albany Devils	2 years, $1.15 million	
July 1, 2015	Jim O'Brien	Hershey Bears	1 year, $575,000	
July 3, 2015	Marc-Andre Gragnani	SC Bern	1 year, $575,000	
July 3, 2015	Yann Danis	Hartford Wolf Pack	1 year, $575,000	
September 8, 2015	Pierre-Luc Letourneau-Leblond	Pittsburgh Penguins	1 year, $575,000	
September 10, 2015	David Schlemko	Calgary Flames	1 year, $625,000	
September 17, 2015	Jiri Tlusty	Winnipeg Jets	1 year, $800,000	
October 3, 2015	Lee Stempniak	Winnipeg Jets	1 year, $850,000	
October 5, 2015	Ken Appleby	Oshawa Generals	3 years, entry-level contract	
March 8, 2016	Nick Lappin	Brown University	2 years, entry-level contract	
May 27, 2016	Yohann Auvitu	HIFK	1 year	

=== Free agents lost ===
Date	Player	New team	Contract terms (in U.S. dollars)	Ref
July 2, 2015	Peter Harrold	St. Louis Blues	1 year, $800,000	
July 2, 2015	Joe Whitney	New York Islanders	1 year, $750,000	
September 17, 2015	Steve Bernier	New York Islanders	1 year, $750,000	
September 28, 2015	Mark Fraser	Ottawa Senators	1 year, $800,000	
October 7, 2015	Scott Gomez	St. Louis Blues	1 year, $575,000	
November 6, 2015	Martin Havlat	St. Louis Blues	1 year, $600,000	
November 24, 2015	Dainius Zubrus	San Jose Sharks	1 year, $600,000	

=== Claimed via waivers ===
Player	Previous team	Date	Ref
Bobby Farnham	Pittsburgh Penguins	October 26, 2015	
David Warsofsky	Pittsburgh Penguins	February 29, 2016	

=== Lost via waivers ===
Player	New team	Date	Ref

=== Players released ===
Date	Player	Via	Ref
July 30, 2015	Dainius Zubrus	Buyout	

=== Lost via retirement ===
Date	Player	Ref
June 30, 2015	Scott Clemmensen	
September 2, 2015	Bryce Salvador	

=== Player signings ===
Date	Player	Contract terms (in U.S. dollars)	Ref
July 1, 2015	Blake Coleman	2 years, entry-level contract	
July 13, 2015	John Quenneville	3 years, entry-level contract	
July 14, 2015	Eric Gelinas	2 years, $3.15 million	
July 17, 2015	Stefan Matteau	2 years, $1.225 million	
July 18, 2015	Seth Helgeson	2 years, $1.175 million	
July 27, 2015	Adam Larsson	6 years, $25 million	
August 11, 2015	Pavel Zacha	3 years, $2.78 million entry-level contract	
December 30, 2015	Mackenzie Blackwood	3 years, entry-level contract	
April 8, 2016	Steven Santini	3 years, entry-level contract	
April 8, 2016	Miles Wood	3 years, entry-level contract	
April 8, 2016	Joshua Jacobs	3 years, entry-level contract	
June 1, 2016	Brandon Baddock	3 years, entry-level contract	

== Draft picks ==
Below are the New Jersey Devils' selections at the 2015 NHL entry draft, which was held on June 26–27, 2015, at the BB&T Center in Sunrise, Florida.

Round	#	Player	Pos	Nationality	College/Junior/Club team (League)
1	6	Pavel Zacha	C	Czech Republic	Sarnia Sting (OHL)
2	42	Mackenzie Blackwood	G	Canada	Barrie Colts (OHL)
3	67	Blake Speers	C	Canada	Sault Ste. Marie Greyhounds (OHL)
4	97	Colton White	D	Canada	Sault Ste. Marie Greyhounds (OHL)
6	157	Brett Seney	LW	Canada	Merrimack College (Hockey East)

Draft notes

- The New Jersey Devils' second-round pick went to the Ottawa Senators as the result of a trade on June 27, 2015, that sent Dallas' second-round pick in 2015 (42nd overall) and a conditional fourth-round pick in 2015 or 2016 to New Jersey in exchange for this pick.
- The Dallas Stars' second-round pick went to the New Jersey Devils as the result of a trade on June 27, 2015, that sent a second-round pick in 2015 (36th overall) to Ottawa in exchange for a conditional fourth-round pick in 2015 or 2016 and this pick.
  Ottawa previously acquired this pick as the result of a trade on July 1, 2014, that sent Jason Spezza and Ludwig Karlsson to the Stars in exchange for Alex Chiasson, Nick Paul, Alex Guptill and this pick.
- The New Jersey Devils' fifth-round pick went to the St. Louis Blues as the result of a trade on March 22, 2013, that sent Matt D'Agostini and a seventh-round pick in 2015 to New Jersey in exchange for this pick (being conditional at the time of the trade). The condition – If D'Agostini is not re-signed by New Jersey then St. Louis will receive a fifth-round pick in 2015 – was converted on July 10, 2013.
- The New Jersey Devils' seventh-round pick went the Los Angeles Kings as the result of a trade on June 30, 2013, that sent a seventh-round pick in 2013 to New Jersey in exchange for this pick.
