= 2015–16 Carolina Hurricanes season =

National Hockey League team season

2015–16 Carolina Hurricanes
- Division: 6th Metropolitan
- Conference: 10th Eastern
- 2015–16 record: 35–31–16
- Home record: 19–15–7
- Road record: 16–16–9
- Goals for: 198
- Goals against: 226

Team information
- General manager: Ron Francis
- Coach: Bill Peters
- Captain: Eric Staal (Oct.–Feb.); Vacant (Feb.–Apr.)
- Alternate captains: Justin Faulk; Jordan Staal
- Arena: PNC Arena
- Minor league affiliate: Charlotte Checkers (AHL)

Team leaders
- Goals: Jeff Skinner (28)
- Assists: Elias Lindholm; Jordan Staal (28)
- Points: Jeff Skinner (51)
- Penalty minutes: Brad Malone (75)
- Plus/minus: Jordan Staal (+6)
- Wins: Cam Ward (23)
- Goals against average: Cam Ward (2.41)

The 2015–16 Carolina Hurricanes season was the 37th season for the National Hockey League (NHL) franchise that was established on June 22, 1979 (following seven seasons of play in the World Hockey Association), and 18th season since the franchise relocated from Hartford to start the 1997–98 NHL season. The season will begin its regular games on October 8, 2015 against the Nashville Predators. The Hurricanes failed to qualify for the playoffs for the seventh consecutive season.

== Standings ==
Metropolitan Division
Pos	Team	GP	W	L	OTL	ROW	GF	GA	GD	Pts
1	p – Washington Capitals	82	56	18	8	52	252	193	+59	120
2	x – Pittsburgh Penguins	82	48	26	8	44	245	203	+42	104
3	x – New York Rangers	82	46	27	9	43	236	217	+19	101
4	x – New York Islanders	82	45	27	10	40	232	216	+16	100
5	x – Philadelphia Flyers	82	41	27	14	38	214	218	−4	96
6	Carolina Hurricanes	82	35	31	16	33	198	226	−28	86
7	New Jersey Devils	82	38	36	8	36	184	208	−24	84
8	Columbus Blue Jackets	82	34	40	8	28	219	252	−33	76

Source: National Hockey League
p – Clinched Presidents' Trophy; x – Clinched playoff spot

Eastern Conference Wild Card
Pos	Div	Team	GP	W	L	OTL	ROW	GF	GA	GD	Pts
1	ME	x – New York Islanders	82	45	27	10	40	232	216	+16	100
2	ME	x – Philadelphia Flyers	82	41	27	14	38	214	218	−4	96
3	AT	Boston Bruins	82	42	31	9	38	240	230	+10	93
4	ME	Carolina Hurricanes	82	35	31	16	33	198	226	−28	86
5	AT	Ottawa Senators	82	38	35	9	32	236	247	−11	85
6	ME	New Jersey Devils	82	38	36	8	36	184	208	−24	84
7	AT	Montreal Canadiens	82	38	38	6	33	221	236	−15	82
8	AT	Buffalo Sabres	82	35	36	11	33	201	222	−21	81
9	ME	Columbus Blue Jackets	82	34	40	8	28	219	252	−33	76
10	AT	Toronto Maple Leafs	82	29	42	11	23	198	246	−48	69

Source: National Hockey League
x – Clinched playoff spot

== Schedule and results ==
=== Pre-season ===
2015 Pre-season game log: 4–2–0 (Home: 4–0–0; Road: 0–2–0)
#	Date	Visitor	Score	Home	OT	Decision	Attendance	Record	Recap
1	September 21	Carolina	0–2	Washington		MacIntyre	15,955	0–1–0	Recap
2	September 22	Carolina	3–7	Pittsburgh		Ward	17,781	0–2–0	Recap
3	September 26	NY Islanders	3–5	Carolina		MacIntyre	––	1–2–0	Recap
4	September 27	Ottawa	1–2	Carolina		Ward	––	2–2–0	Recap
5	September 30	Washington	3–4	Carolina	SO	Lack	6,256	3–2–0	Recap
6	October 2	Pittsburgh	1–2	Carolina		Ward	7,986	4–2–0	Recap

=== Regular season ===
2015–16 Game Log

October: 5–6–0 (Home: 1–2–0; Road: 4–4–0)
#	Date	Visitor	Score	Home	OT	Decision	Attendance	Record	Pts	Recap
1	October 8	Carolina	1–2	Nashville		Ward	17,204	0–1–0	0	Recap
2	October 10	Detroit	4–3	Carolina		Ward	18,949	0–2–0	0	Recap
3	October 13	Florida	4–1	Carolina		Lack	10,901	0–3–0	0	Recap
4	October 16	Carolina	5–3	Detroit		Ward	20,027	1–3–0	2	Recap
5	October 17	Carolina	1–4	Washington		Ward	18,506	1–4–0	2	Recap
6	October 21	Carolina	1–0	Colorado	OT	Ward	12,826	2–4–0	4	Recap
7	October 23	Carolina	0–3	Los Angeles		Ward	18,230	2–5–0	4	Recap
8	October 24	Carolina	2–5	San Jose		Lack	15,814	2–6–0	4	Recap
9	October 27	Carolina	3–1	Detroit		Ward	20,027	3–6–0	6	Recap
10	October 29	Carolina	3–2	NY Islanders	OT	Lack	11,494	4–6–0	8	Recap
11	October 30	Colorado	2–3	Carolina		Ward	9,345	5–6–0	10	Recap

November: 3–6–4 (Home: 3–3–3; Road: 0–3–1)
#	Date	Visitor	Score	Home	OT	Decision	Attendance	Record	Pts	Recap
12	November 1	Tampa Bay	4–3	Carolina		Ward	9,081	5–7–0	10	Recap
13	November 6	Dallas	4–1	Carolina		Lack	10,188	5–8–0	10	Recap
14	November 7	Ottawa	2–3	Carolina	OT	Ward	10,005	6–8–0	12	Recap
15	November 10	Carolina	0–3	NY Rangers		Ward	18,006	6–9–0	12	Recap
16	November 12	Minnesota	3–2	Carolina	OT	Ward	9,511	6–9–1	13	Recap
17	November 14	Philadelphia	3–2	Carolina	OT	Ward	13,758	6–9–2	14	Recap
18	November 16	Anaheim	4–1	Carolina		Lack	9,305	6–10–2	14	Recap
19	November 20	Toronto	2–1	Carolina	SO	Ward	10,327	6–10–3	15	Recap
20	November 22	Los Angeles	3–4	Carolina		Ward	10,154	7–10–3	17	Recap
21	November 23	Carolina	2–3	Philadelphia	OT	Lack	18,636	7–10–4	18	Recap
22	November 25	Edmonton	1–4	Carolina		Ward	17,757	8–10–4	20	Recap
23	November 27	Carolina	1–4	Buffalo		Ward	18,052	8–11–4	20	Recap
24	November 30	Carolina	3–4	NY Rangers		Ward	18,006	8–12–4	20	Recap

December: 8–5–1 (Home: 4–3–0; Road: 4–2–1)
#	Date	Visitor	Score	Home	OT	Decision	Attendance	Record	Pts	Recap
25	December 3	New Jersey	5–1	Carolina		Lack	9,254	8–13–4	20	Recap
26	December 5	Montreal	2–3	Carolina		Ward	10,687	9–13–4	22	Recap
27	December 6	Arizona	4–5	Carolina		Ward	9,021	10–13–4	24	Recap
28	December 8	Carolina	5–6	Dallas		Lack	18,287	10–14–4	24	Recap
29	December 11	Carolina	5–1	Anaheim		Lack	17,174	11–14–4	26	Recap
30	December 12	Carolina	5–4	Arizona	OT	Lack	12,668	12–14–4	28	Recap
31	December 15	Carolina	3–4	Philadelphia	OT	Lack	18,205	12–14–5	29	Recap
32	December 18	Florida	2–0	Carolina		Ward	10,511	12–15–5	29	Recap
33	December 19	Carolina	2–1	Pittsburgh		Ward	18,590	13–15–5	31	Recap
34	December 21	Washington	2–1	Carolina		Ward	13,228	13–16–5	31	Recap
35	December 26	New Jersey	1–3	Carolina		Ward	11,654	14–16–5	33	Recap
36	December 27	Carolina	2–1	Chicago		Lack	22,157	15–16–5	35	Recap
37	December 29	Carolina	2–3	New Jersey		Ward	16,514	15–17–5	35	Recap
38	December 31	Washington	2–4	Carolina		Lack	14,134	16–17–5	37	Recap

January: 7–3–3 (Home: 4–1–2; Road: 3–2–1)
#	Date	Visitor	Score	Home	OT	Decision	Attendance	Record	Pts	Recap
39	January 2	Nashville	2–1	Carolina	OT	Lack	12,149	16–17–6	38	Recap
40	January 4	Carolina	0–1	Edmonton	OT	Ward	16,839	16–17–7	39	Recap
41	January 6	Carolina	2–3	Vancouver		Lack	18,364	16–18–7	39	Recap
42	January 8	Columbus	1–4	Carolina		Ward	14,241	17–18–7	41	Recap
43	January 9	Carolina	4–3	Columbus	OT	Ward	16,532	18–18–7	43	Recap
44	January 12	Pittsburgh	2–3	Carolina	OT	Ward	13,012	19–18–7	45	Recap
45	January 14	Carolina	4–1	St. Louis		Lack	19,282	20–18–7	47	Recap
46	January 15	Vancouver	3–2	Carolina	OT	Ward	11,657	20–18–8	48	Recap
47	January 17	Carolina	0–5	Pittsburgh		Lack	18,528	20–19–8	48	Recap
48	January 21	Carolina	1–0	Toronto	OT	Lack	18,981	21–19–8	50	Recap
49	January 22	NY Rangers	4–1	Carolina		Lack	14,102	21–20–8	50	Recap
50	January 24	Calgary	2–5	Carolina		Lack	9,934	22–20–8	52	Recap
51	January 26	Chicago	0–5	Carolina		Lack	14,588	23–20–8	54	Recap

February: 5–6–2 (Home: 4–3–1; Road: 1–3–1)
#	Date	Visitor	Score	Home	OT	Decision	Attendance	Record	Pts	Recap
52	February 3	Carolina	1–4	Calgary		Lack	18,895	23–21–8	54	Recap
53	February 5	Carolina	5–3	Winnipeg		Ward	15,924	24–21–8	56	Recap
54	February 7	Carolina	1–2	Montreal	SO	Ward	21,288	24–21–9	57	Recap
55	February 12	Pittsburgh	2–1	Carolina	SO	Ward	15,783	24–21–10	58	Recap
56	February 13	NY Islanders	3–6	Carolina		Ward	12,665	25–21–10	60	Recap
57	February 16	Winnipeg	1–2	Carolina		Lack	10,489	26–21–10	62	Recap
58	February 18	Carolina	2–4	Ottawa		Lack	16,994	26–22–10	62	Recap
59	February 19	San Jose	2–5	Carolina		Ward	11,756	27–22–10	64	Recap
60	February 21	Tampa Bay	4–2	Carolina		Ward	10,422	27–23–10	64	Recap
61	February 23	Philadelphia	1–3	Carolina		Ward	10,896	28–23–10	66	Recap
62	February 25	Carolina	1–3	Toronto		Ward	18,862	28–24–10	66	Recap
63	February 26	Boston	4–1	Carolina		Ward	17,917	28–25–10	66	Recap
64	February 28	St. Louis	5–2	Carolina		Ward	15,128	28–26–10	66	Recap

March: 6–2–6 (Home: 3–1–1; Road: 3–1–5)
#	Date	Visitor	Score	Home	OT	Decision	Attendance	Record	Pts	Recap
65	March 1	Carolina	3–1	New Jersey		Ward	14,251	29–26–10	68	Recap
66	March 5	Carolina	3–4	Tampa Bay	OT	Lack	19,092	29–26–11	69	Recap
67	March 8	Ottawa	3–4	Carolina	SO	Ward	10,743	30–26–11	71	Recap
68	March 10	Carolina	3–2	Boston	OT	Ward	17,565	31–26–11	73	Recap
69	March 12	Carolina	2–3	Buffalo	OT	Ward	19,070	31–26–12	74	Recap
70	March 15	Carolina	1–2	Washington	OT	Lack	18,506	31–26–13	75	Recap
71	March 17	Carolina	2–4	Pittsburgh		Lack	18,455	31–27–13	75	Recap
72	March 19	Carolina	2–3	Minnesota	SO	Ward	19,044	31–27–14	76	Recap
73	March 22	Buffalo	3–2	Carolina		Ward	10,372	31–28–14	76	Recap
74	March 24	Carolina	3–2	Columbus		Lack	15,624	32–28–14	78	Recap
75	March 26	NY Islanders	4–3	Carolina	OT	Lack	11,636	32–28–15	79	Recap
76	March 27	New Jersey	2–3	Carolina		Ward	12,792	33–28–15	81	Recap
77	March 29	Carolina	1–2	NY Islanders	SO	Ward	13,733	33–28–16	82	Recap
78	March 31	NY Rangers	3–4	Carolina		Ward	16,336	34–28–16	84	Recap

April: 1–3–0 (Home: 0–2–0; Road: 1–1–0)
#	Date	Visitor	Score	Home	OT	Decision	Attendance	Record	Pts	Recap
79	April 2	Columbus	5–1	Carolina		Lack	11,542	34–29–16	84	Recap
80	April 5	Carolina	2–1	Boston	SO	Ward	17,565	35–29–16	86	Recap
81	April 7	Montreal	4–2	Carolina		Ward	15,120	35–30–16	86	Recap
82	April 9	Carolina	2–5	Florida		Lack	18,434	35–31–16	86	Recap

Legend: Win (2 points) Loss (0 points) Overtime/shootout loss (1 point)

== Player stats ==
Final stats

=== Skaters ===
Regular season
Player	GP	G	A	Pts	+/−	PIM
Jeff Skinner	82	28	23	51	−2	38
Jordan Staal	82	20	28	48	6	34
Victor Rask	80	21	27	48	−6	24
Elias Lindholm	82	11	28	39	−23	24
Justin Faulk	64	16	21	37	−22	27
Kris Versteeg^{‡}	63	11	22	33	−6	36
Eric Staal^{‡}	63	10	23	33	−3	32
Joakim Nordstrom	71	10	14	24	1	12
Andrej Nestrasil	55	9	14	23	4	8
Riley Nash	64	9	13	22	−5	18
Noah Hanifin	79	4	18	22	−14	22
Jaccob Slavin	63	2	18	20	1	8
Ron Hainsey	81	5	14	19	−13	37
Phillip Di Giuseppe	41	7	10	17	0	18
Brett Pesce	69	4	12	16	−7	16
John-Michael Liles^{‡}	64	6	9	15	−3	16
Chris Terry	68	8	3	11	−12	16
Jay McClement	77	3	8	11	−17	24
Ryan Murphy	35	0	10	10	−1	10
Nathan Gerbe	47	3	4	7	−15	14
Brad Malone	57	2	4	6	−11	75
Brock McGinn	21	3	1	4	−14	10
Derek Ryan	6	2	0	2	1	2
Patrick Brown	7	1	1	2	4	4
Michal Jordan	36	1	0	1	−5	12
Sergey Tolchinsky	2	0	1	1	1	0
James Wisniewski	1	0	0	0	0	0
Brody Sutter	8	0	0	0	−4	0
Brendan Woods	5	0	0	0	0	7
Trevor Carrick	2	0	0	0	−1	0

=== Goaltenders ===
Regular season
Player	GP	GS	TOI	W	L	OT	GA	GAA	SA	SV%	SO	G	A	PIM
Cam Ward	52	51	3,038	23	17	10	122	2.41	1343	.909	1	0	0	0
Eddie Lack	34	31	1,920	12	14	6	90	2.81	910	.901	2	0	2	0

^{†}Denotes player spent time with another team before joining the Hurricanes. Stats reflect time with the Hurricanes only.
^{‡}Denotes player was traded mid-season. Stats reflect time with the Hurricanes only.
Bold/italics denotes franchise record.

== Awards and honours ==
=== Awards ===
Regular season
Player	Award	Awarded
J. Faulk	NHL Third Star of the Week	December 14, 2015
J. Faulk	NHL All-Star game selection	January 6, 2016

=== Milestones ===
Regular season
Player	Milestone	Reached
N. Hanifin	1st Career NHL Game	October 8, 2015
N. Hanifin	1st Career NHL Assist; 1st Career NHL Point	October 10, 2015
B. McGinn	1st Career NHL Game; 1st Career NHL Goal; 1st Career NHL Assist; 1st Career NHL Point	October 16, 2015
B. Pesce	1st Career NHL Game	October 24, 2015
B. Pesce	1st Career NHL Assist; 1st Career NHL Point	October 30, 2015
C. Ward	250th Career NHL Win	October 30, 2015
C. Ward	30,000 Career NHL Minutes	November 10, 2015
N. Hanifin	1st Career NHL Goal	November 16, 2015
J. Slavin	1st Career NHL Game	November 20, 2015
B. Pesce	1st Career NHL Goal	November 22, 2015
V. Rask	100th Career NHL Game	November 22, 2015
J. Slavin	1st Career NHL Assist; 1st Career NHL Point	November 30, 2015
P. Di Giuseppe	1st Career NHL Game	December 5, 2015
K. Versteeg	500th Career NHL Game	December 8, 2015
J. Slavin	1st Career NHL Goal	December 8, 2015
P. Di Giuseppe	1st Career NHL Goal; 1st Career NHL Point	December 8, 2015
R. Nash	200th Career NHL Game	December 19, 2015
J. Faulk	100th Career NHL Assist	December 19, 2015
C. Terry	100th Career NHL Game	December 26, 2015
J. McClement	800th Career NHL Game	December 27, 2015
J. Faulk	200th Career NHL Game	December 31, 2015
J. Staal	200th Career NHL Assist	December 31, 2015
K. Versteeg	300th Career NHL Point	January 9, 2016

== Transactions ==
The Hurricanes have been involved in the following transactions during the 2015–16 season.

=== Trades ===
Date	Details		Ref
June 27, 2015	To Vancouver Canucks 3rd-round pick in 2015; 7th-round pick in 2016	To Carolina Hurricanes Eddie Lack
June 27, 2015	To Anaheim Ducks Anton Khudobin	To Carolina Hurricanes James Wisniewski
September 11, 2015	To Chicago Blackhawks Dennis Robertson; Jake Massie; 5th-round pick in 2017	To Carolina Hurricanes Kris Versteeg; Joakim Nordstrom; 3rd-round pick in 2017
February 28, 2016	To New York Rangers Eric Staal^{[Note 1]}	To Carolina Hurricanes Aleksi Saarela; 2nd-round pick in 2016; 2nd-round pick in 2017
February 29, 2016	To Los Angeles Kings Kris Versteeg	To Carolina Hurricanes Valentin Zykov; Conditional 5th-round pick in 2016
February 29, 2016	To Chicago Blackhawks Drew MacIntyre	To Carolina Hurricanes Dennis Robertson
February 29, 2016	To Boston Bruins John-Michael Liles	To Carolina Hurricanes Anthony Camara; 3rd-round pick in 2016; 5th-round pick in 2017
March 7, 2016	To Vancouver Canucks Future considerations	To Carolina Hurricanes Dane Fox
June 15, 2016	To Chicago Blackhawks NYR's 2nd round pick in 2016; CHI's 3rd round pick in 2017	To Carolina Hurricanes Teuvo Teravainen; Bryan Bickell

Notes

- ^{Note 1} Carolina to retain 50% ($4.125 million) of salary as part of trade.

=== Free agents acquired ===
Date	Player	Former team	Contract terms (in U.S. dollars)	Ref
July 1, 2015	T.J. Hensick	Hamilton Bulldogs	1 year, $600,000	
March 8, 2016	Andrew Poturalski	University of New Hampshire	2 years, $1.5325 million entry-level contract	
April 22, 2016	Jake Chelios	Charlotte Checkers	1 year, $575,000	

=== Free agents lost ===
Date	Player	New team	Contract terms (in U.S. dollars)	Ref
July 2, 2015	Ben Holmstrom	New York Islanders	1 year, $750,000	
July 24, 2015	Alexander Semin	Montreal Canadiens	1 year, $1.1 million	

=== Claimed via waivers ===
Player	Previous team	Date

=== Lost via waivers ===
Player	New team	Date

=== Lost via retirement ===
Date	Player
July 15, 2015	Greg Nemisz

=== Players released ===
Date	Player	Via	Ref
July 1, 2015	Alexander Semin	Buyout	

=== Player signings ===
Date	Player	Contract terms (in U.S. dollars)	Ref
June 29, 2015	Andrej Nestrasil	2 years, $1.825 million	
July 1, 2015	Jaccob Slavin	3 years, $2.4975 million entry-level contract	
July 1, 2015	Riley Nash	1 year, $1.15 million	
July 1, 2015	Rasmus Rissanen	1 year, $575,000	
July 7, 2015	Zach Boychuk	1 year, $600,000	
July 11, 2015	Noah Hanifin	3 years, $2.4975 million entry-level contract	
July 12, 2015	Justin Shugg	1 year, $600,000	
July 15, 2015	Brody Sutter	1 year, $600,000	
August 27, 2015	Elias Lindholm	2 years, $5.4 million contract extension	
October 3, 2015	Eddie Lack	2 years, $5.5 million contract extension	
April 4, 2016	Clark Bishop	3 years, $1.875 million entry-level contract	
April 9, 2016	Nicolas Roy	3 years, $1.875 million entry-level contract	
April 22, 2016	Joakim Nordstrom	2 years, $2.55 million contract extension	
June 1, 2016	Josh Wesley	3 years, $1.875 million entry-level contract	
June 13, 2016	Sebastian Aho	3 years, $2.4975 million entry-level contract	
June 13, 2016	Aleksi Saarela	3 years, $2.05 million entry-level contract	
June 16, 2016	Cam Ward	2 years, $6.6 million	
June 16, 2016	Derek Ryan	1 year, $600,000	

== Draft picks ==
Below are the Carolina Hurricanes' selections at the 2015 NHL entry draft, held on June 26–27, 2015 at the BB&T Center in Sunrise, Florida.

Round	#	Player	Pos	Nationality	College/Junior/Club team (League)
1	5	Noah Hanifin	D	United States	Boston College (Hockey East)
2	35	Sebastian Aho	LW	Finland	Oulun Kärpät (Liiga)
4	93^{[a]}	Callum Booth	G	Canada	Quebec Remparts (QMJHL)
4	96	Nicolas Roy	C	Canada	Chicoutimi Saguenéens (QMJHL)
5	126	Luke Stevens	LW	United States	Noble & Greenough (HS-MA)
5	138^{[b]}	Spencer Smallman	RW	Canada	Saint John Sea Dogs (QMJHL)
6	156	Jake Massie	D	Canada	Kimball Union Academy Wildcats (HS-NH)
6	169^{[c]}	David Cotton	C	United States	Cushing Academy (HS-MA)
7	186	Steven Lorentz	C	Canada	Peterborough Petes (OHL)

Draft notes

- ^{a} The Arizona Coyotes' fourth-round pick went the Carolina Hurricanes as the result of a trade on February 28, 2015 that sent Tim Gleason to Washington in exchange for Jack Hillen and this pick.
  Washington previously acquired this pick as the result of a trade on March 4, 2014 that sent Martin Erat and John Mitchell to Phoenix in exchange for Rostislav Klesla, Chris Brown and this pick.
- ^{b} The Winnipeg Jets' fifth-round pick went to the Carolina Hurricanes as the result of a trade on February 25, 2015 that sent Jiri Tlusty to Winnipeg in exchange for a third-round pick in 2016 and this pick (being conditional at the time of the trade). The condition – Carolina will receive a fifth-round pick in 2015 if Winnipeg qualifies for the 2015 Stanley Cup playoffs – was converted on April 9, 2015.
- ^{c} The Ottawa Senators' sixth-round pick went to the Carolina Hurricanes as the result of a trade on December 18, 2014 that sent Jay Harrison to Winnipeg in exchange for this pick.
  Winnipeg previously acquired this pick as the result of a trade on June 28, 2014 that sent a seventh-round pick in 2014 to Ottawa in exchange for this pick.
