= 2015–16 Buffalo Sabres season =

NHL hockey team season

2015–16 Buffalo Sabres
- Division: 7th Atlantic
- Conference: 14th Eastern
- 2015–16 record: 35–36–11
- Home record: 16–19–6
- Road record: 19–17–5
- Goals for: 201
- Goals against: 222

Team information
- General manager: Tim Murray
- Coach: Dan Bylsma
- Captain: Brian Gionta
- Alternate captains: Tyler Ennis; Josh Gorges; Ryan O'Reilly
- Arena: First Niagara Center
- Minor league affiliates: Rochester Americans (AHL); Elmira Jackals (ECHL)

Team leaders
- Goals: Jack Eichel (24)
- Assists: Ryan O'Reilly (39)
- Points: Ryan O'Reilly (60)
- Penalty minutes: Evander Kane (91)
- Plus/minus: Jake McCabe (+6)
- Wins: Chad Johnson (22)
- Goals against average: Chad Johnson (2.36)

The 2015–16 Buffalo Sabres season was the 46th season for the National Hockey League (NHL) franchise that was established on May 22, 1970. The season began its regular games on October 8, 2015 against the Ottawa Senators with a 3–1 loss.

This was originally to be the final season in which Rick Jeanneret serves as the team's play-by-play announcer; he had been in that position since the team's second season in 1971. As he did until 2022, he rotated with Dan Dunleavy in the position. However, Jeanneret agreed to continue indefinitely as part-time announcer as long as his health allowed it.

The Sabres failed to qualify for the playoffs for the fifth straight year.

== Off-season ==
The Sabres fired head coach Ted Nolan on April 12, 2015, amid poor on-ice record and disagreements with general manager Tim Murray. The team then made overtures to Mike Babcock, the most prominent head coach on the free agent market; despite a record-setting offer, Babcock instead sought (and received) the head coaching position for the Sabres' division and regional rivals, the Toronto Maple Leafs. With the Sabres failing to land Babcock, the team's second choice, Dan Bylsma, was subsequently hired on May 28. Bylsma had spent the 2014-15 season out of professional hockey after spending the previous five seasons with the Pittsburgh Penguins.

The Sabres held the second overall pick in the 2015 NHL entry draft after finishing last in the league in 2014-15 and losing the draft lottery to the Edmonton Oilers. The Sabres selected Jack Eichel with their pick.

The Sabres fired President Ted Black on July 27, 2015, and replaced him with Russ Brandon. Brandon also serves as President of the Buffalo Bills of the National Football League and will continue in that capacity in addition to his duties with the Sabres.

=== Training camp ===
As in previous years, the Sabres held a summer development camp from July 6–11, 2015. The highlight of the camp was the "blue and gold" scrimmage on July 10; the scrimmage, which pit a "gold" team led by 2015 second overall pick Jack Eichel against a "blue" team led by 2014 second overall pick Sam Reinhart, drew 17,115 paying fans, nearly double the crowd that attended the 2014 event. An additional 1,500 fans attended the less-publicized 3-on-3 scrimmage, which closed out the camp on July 11.

The Sabres did not participate in the Detroit Red Wings' annual prospect tournament in Traverse City, Michigan as they have in recent years and instead launched their own "Prospect Challenge" beginning this season. For the first year, the Sabres, New Jersey Devils and Boston Bruins prospects faced each other in a single round-robin mini-tournament. Buffalo won both of their games and the tournament.

== Standings ==
Atlantic Division
Pos	Team	GP	W	L	OTL	ROW	GF	GA	GD	Pts
1	y – Florida Panthers	82	47	26	9	40	239	203	+36	103
2	x – Tampa Bay Lightning	82	46	31	5	43	227	201	+26	97
3	x – Detroit Red Wings	82	41	30	11	39	211	224	−13	93
4	Boston Bruins	82	42	31	9	38	240	230	+10	93
5	Ottawa Senators	82	38	35	9	32	236	247	−11	85
6	Montreal Canadiens	82	38	38	6	33	221	236	−15	82
7	Buffalo Sabres	82	35	36	11	33	201	222	−21	81
8	Toronto Maple Leafs	82	29	42	11	23	198	246	−48	69

Source: National Hockey League
x – Clinched playoff spot; y – Clinched division

Eastern Conference Wild Card
Pos	Div	Team	GP	W	L	OTL	ROW	GF	GA	GD	Pts
1	ME	x – New York Islanders	82	45	27	10	40	232	216	+16	100
2	ME	x – Philadelphia Flyers	82	41	27	14	38	214	218	−4	96
3	AT	Boston Bruins	82	42	31	9	38	240	230	+10	93
4	ME	Carolina Hurricanes	82	35	31	16	33	198	226	−28	86
5	AT	Ottawa Senators	82	38	35	9	32	236	247	−11	85
6	ME	New Jersey Devils	82	38	36	8	36	184	208	−24	84
7	AT	Montreal Canadiens	82	38	38	6	33	221	236	−15	82
8	AT	Buffalo Sabres	82	35	36	11	33	201	222	−21	81
9	ME	Columbus Blue Jackets	82	34	40	8	28	219	252	−33	76
10	AT	Toronto Maple Leafs	82	29	42	11	23	198	246	−48	69

Source: National Hockey League
x – Clinched playoff spot

== Schedule and results ==
=== Preseason ===
2015 preseason game log: 4–3–0 (Home: 1–2–0; Road: 3–1–0)
#	Date	Visitor	Score	Home	OT	Decision	Attendance	Record	Recap
1	September 21	Buffalo	3–2	Minnesota		Lieuwen	17,217	1–0–0	Recap
2	September 23	Ottawa	5–2	Buffalo		Lehner	17,298	1–1–0	Recap
3	September 25	Buffalo	6–4	Toronto		Lieuwen	17,403	2–1–0	Recap
4	September 26	Buffalo	6–4	Ottawa		Johnson	16,738	3–1–0	Recap
5	September 29	Toronto	0–4	Buffalo		Lehner	17,357	4–1–0	Recap
6	October 1	Buffalo	1–6	Minnesota		Johnson	17,214	4–2–0	Recap
7	October 2	Columbus	6–4	Buffalo		Lehner	17,578	4–3–0	Recap

=== Regular season ===
2015–16 game log

October: 4–7–0 (Home: 3–4–0; Road: 1–3–0)
#	Date	Visitor	Score	Home	OT	Decision	Attendance	Record	Pts	Recap
1	October 8	Ottawa	3–1	Buffalo		Johnson	19,070	0–1–0	0	Recap
2	October 10	Tampa Bay	4–1	Buffalo		Johnson	17,739	0–2–0	0	Recap
3	October 12	Columbus	2–4	Buffalo		Johnson	18,075	1–2–0	2	Recap
4	October 15	Buffalo	2–3	Florida		Johnson	11,616	1–3–0	2	Recap
5	October 17	Buffalo	1–2	Tampa Bay		Johnson	19,092	1–4–0	2	Recap
6	October 21	Toronto	1–2	Buffalo	SO	Johnson	17,762	2–4–0	4	Recap
7	October 23	Montreal	7–2	Buffalo		Johnson	18,214	2–5–0	4	Recap
8	October 24	New Jersey	4–3	Buffalo		Ullmark	18,040	2–6–0	4	Recap
9	October 27	Buffalo	4–3	Philadelphia	OT	Johnson	19,432	3–6–0	6	Recap
10	October 29	Buffalo	3–4	Pittsburgh		Johnson	18,415	3–7–0	6	Recap
11	October 30	Philadelphia	1–3	Buffalo		Ullmark	15,962	4–7–0	8	Reacp

November: 6–5–2 (Home: 2–4–1; Road: 4–1–1)
#	Date	Visitor	Score	Home	OT	Decision	Attendance	Record	Pts	Recap
12	November 1	Buffalo	2–1	NY Islanders		Ullmark	11,278	5–7–0	10	Recap
13	November 5	Tampa Bay	4–1	Buffalo		Ullmark	18,161	5–8–0	10	Recap
14	November 7	Vancouver	2–3	Buffalo		Ullmark	19,070	6–8–0	12	Recap
15	November 10	Buffalo	4–1	Tampa Bay		Johnson	19,092	7–8–0	14	Recap
16	November 12	Buffalo	3–2	Florida		Ullmark	11,271	8–8–0	16	Recap
17	November 14	San Jose	2–1	Buffalo	OT	Johnson	18,611	8–8–1	17	Recap
18	November 17	Dallas	3–1	Buffalo		Ullmark	18,101	8–9–1	17	Recap
19	November 19	Buffalo	2–3	St. Louis	SO	Ullmark	17,359	8–9–2	18	Recap
20	November 21	Buffalo	0–3	Dallas		Johnson	18,532	8–10–2	18	Recap
21	November 23	St. Louis	2–1	Buffalo		Ullmark	17,563	8–11–2	18	Recap
22	November 25	Nashville	3–2	Buffalo		Ullmark	17,871	8–12–2	18	Recap
23	November 27	Carolina	1–4	Buffalo		Johnson	18,052	9–12–2	20	Recap
24	November 28	Buffalo	4–1	Nashville		Johnson	17,217	10–12–2	22	Recap

December: 5–7–2 (Home: 3–3–1; Road: 2–4–1)
#	Date	Visitor	Score	Home	OT	Decision	Attendance	Record	Pts	Recap
25	December 1	Buffalo	4–5	Detroit	SO	Ullmark	20,027	10–12–3	23	Recap
26	December 4	Arizona	2–5	Buffalo		Johnson	18,204	11–12–3	25	Recap
27	December 6	Buffalo	2–4	Edmonton		Johnson	16,839	11–13–3	25	Recap
28	December 7	Buffalo	2–5	Vancouver		Ullmark	18,278	11–14–3	25	Recap
29	December 10	Buffalo	3–4	Calgary		Johnson	18,565	11–15–3	25	Recap
30	December 12	Los Angeles	1–2	Buffalo	OT	Ullmark	18,133	12–15–3	27	Recap
31	December 14	Buffalo	2–1	Detroit		Johnson	20,027	13–15–3	29	Recap
32	December 15	New Jersey	2–0	Buffalo		Ullmark	18,297	13–16–3	29	Recap
33	December 17	Anaheim	0–3	Buffalo		Johnson	18,801	14–16–3	31	Recap
34	December 19	Chicago	3–2	Buffalo	SO	Johnson	18,870	14–16–4	32	Recap
35	December 26	Buffalo	6–3	Boston		Johnson	17,565	15–16–4	34	Recap
36	December 28	Washington	2–0	Buffalo		Ullmark	19,070	15–17–4	34	Recap
37	December 30	Buffalo	2–5	Washington		Johnson	18,506	15–18–4	34	Recap
38	December 31	NY Islanders	2–1	Buffalo		Ullmark	19,070	15–19–4	34	Recap

January: 5–7–0 (Home: 1–4–0; Road: 4–3–0)
#	Date	Visitor	Score	Home	OT	Decision	Attendance	Record	Pts	Recap
39	January 2	Detroit	4–3	Buffalo		Johnson	19,070	15–20–4	34	Recap
40	January 5	Florida	5–1	Buffalo		Ullmark	18,560	15–21–4	34	Recap
41	January 8	Buffalo	1–3	Chicago		Johnson	22,142	15–22–4	34	Recap
42	January 10	Buffalo	4–2	Winnipeg		Ullmark	15,294	16–22–4	36	Recap
43	January 12	Buffalo	3–2	Minnesota		Ullmark	19,034	17–22–4	38	Recap
44	January 15	Boston	4–1	Buffalo		Lehner	18,704	17–23–4	38	Recap
45	January 16	Washington	1–4	Buffalo		Johnson	19,070	18–23–4	40	Recap
46	January 18	Buffalo	2–1	Arizona		Johnson	11,134	19–23–4	42	Recap
47	January 20	Buffalo	1–2	Colorado		Lehner	13,274	19–24–4	42	Recap
48	January 22	Detroit	3–0	Buffalo		Lehner	18,601	19–25–4	42	Recap
49	January 25	Buffalo	3–6	NY Rangers		Johnson	18,006	19–26–4	42	Recap
50	January 26	Buffalo	3–2	Ottawa		Lehner	16,815	20–26–4	44	Recap

February: 5–5–3 (Home: 2–2–1; Road: 3–3–2)
#	Date	Visitor	Score	Home	OT	Decision	Attendance	Record	Pts	Recap
51	February 3	Buffalo	4–2	Montreal		Lehner	21,288	21–26–4	46	Recap
52	February 4	Boston	3–2	Buffalo	SO	Johnson	18,845	21–26–5	47	Recap
53	February 6	Buffalo	1–2	Boston	OT	Lehner	17,565	21–26–6	48	Recap
54	February 9	Florida	7–4	Buffalo		Johnson	18,837	21–27–6	48	Recap
55	February 11	Buffalo	1–5	Philadelphia		Lehner	19,019	21–28–6	48	Recap
56	February 12	Montreal	4–6	Buffalo		Johnson	18,505	22–28–6	50	Recap
57	February 14	Colorado	1–4	Buffalo		Lehner	19,070	23–28–6	52	Recap
58	February 16	Buffalo	1–2	Ottawa	SO	Lehner	15,893	23–28–7	53	Recap
59	February 19	Buffalo	4–0	Columbus		Lehner	14,923	24–28–7	55	Recap
60	February 21	Pittsburgh	4–3	Buffalo		Lehner	19,070	24–29–7	55	Recap
61	February 24	Buffalo	0–1	Anaheim		Lehner	16,543	24–30–7	55	Recap
62	February 26	Buffalo	3–1	San Jose		Johnson	17,562	25–30–7	57	Recap
63	February 27	Buffalo	0–2	Los Angeles		Lehner	18,230	25–31–7	57	Recap

March: 7–4–4 (Home: 5–1–3; Road: 2–3–1)
#	Date	Visitor	Score	Home	OT	Decision	Attendance	Record	Pts	Recap
64	March 1	Edmonton	2–1	Buffalo	OT	Lehner	19,070	25–31–8	58	Recap
65	March 3	Calgary	3–6	Buffalo		Lehner	18,651	26–31–8	60	Recap
66	March 5	Minnesota	3–2	Buffalo	SO	Lehner	19,070	26–31–9	61	Recap
67	March 7	Buffalo	4–3	Toronto	SO	Johnson	18,950	27–31–9	63	Recap
68	March 8	NY Rangers	4–2	Buffalo		Johnson	18,651	27–32–9	63	Recap
69	March 10	Buffalo	2–3	Montreal		Lehner	21,288	27–33–9	63	Recap
70	March 12	Carolina	2–3	Buffalo	OT	Johnson	19,070	28–33–9	65	Recap
71	March 16	Montreal	3–2	Buffalo	OT	Lehner	18,815	28–33–10	66	Recap
72	March 18	Ottawa	1–3	Buffalo		Johnson	19,070	29–33–10	68	Recap
73	March 19	Buffalo	1–4	Toronto		Johnson	18,829	29–34–10	68	Recap
74	March 22	Buffalo	3–2	Carolina		Johnson	10,372	30–34–10	70	Recap
75	March 26	Winnipeg	2–3	Buffalo		Johnson	19,070	31–34–10	72	Recap
76	March 28	Buffalo	2–3	Detroit		Johnson	20,027	31–35–10	72	Recap
77	March 29	Buffalo	4–5	Pittsburgh	SO	Johnson	18,513	31–35–11	73	Recap
78	March 31	Toronto	1–4	Buffalo		Johnson	18,873	32–35–11	75	Recap

April: 3–1–0 (Home: 0–1–0; Road: 3–0–0)
#	Date	Visitor	Score	Home	OT	Decision	Attendance	Record	Pts	Recap
79	April 2	Buffalo	4–3	NY Rangers		Johnson	18,006	33–35–11	77	Recap
80	April 5	Buffalo	3–1	New Jersey		Johnson	14,773	34–35–11	79	Recap
81	April 8	Columbus	4–1	Buffalo		Kasdorf	19,070	34–36–11	79	Recap
82	April 9	Buffalo	4–3	NY Islanders	OT	Ullmark	14,811	35–36–11	81	Recap

Legend: Win (2 points) Loss (0 points) Overtime/shootout loss (1 point)

== Player stats ==
Final stats

=== Skaters ===
Regular season
Player	GP	G	A	Pts	+/−	PIM
Ryan O'Reilly	71	21	39	60	−16	8
Jack Eichel	81	24	32	56	−16	22
Sam Reinhart	79	23	19	42	−8	8
Rasmus Ristolainen	82	9	32	41	−21	33
Evander Kane	65	20	15	35	−14	91
Brian Gionta	79	12	21	33	−5	12
Jamie McGinn^{‡}	63	14	13	27	−10	10
Zach Bogosian	64	7	17	24	−11	68
Marcus Foligno	75	10	13	23	4	79
Matt Moulson	81	8	13	21	−5	16
Zemgus Girgensons	71	7	11	18	0	20
Johan Larsson	74	10	7	17	−4	27
Cody Franson	59	4	13	17	−5	26
David Legwand	79	5	9	14	−4	14
Jake McCabe	77	4	10	14	6	51
Nicolas Deslauriers	70	6	6	12	−14	59
Josh Gorges	77	2	10	12	−7	72
Tyler Ennis	23	3	8	11	−9	11
Mark Pysyk	55	1	10	11	−1	32
Cal O'Reilly	20	3	4	7	−1	2
Carlo Colaiacovo	36	1	4	5	−11	10
Mike Weber^{‡}	35	1	4	5	3	32
Casey Nelson	7	0	4	4	1	8
Tim Schaller	17	1	2	3	3	2
Hudson Fasching	7	1	1	2	2	4
Evan Rodrigues	2	1	1	2	2	2
Phil Varone^{‡}	5	1	1	2	1	2
Daniel Catenacci	11	0	0	0	−2	0
Cole Schneider	2	0	0	0	0	0
Chad Ruhwedel	1	0	0	0	0	2
Justin Bailey	8	0	0	0	−2	2

=== Goaltenders ===
Regular season
Player	GP	GS	TOI	W	L	OT	GA	GAA	SA	SV%	SO	G	A	PIM
Chad Johnson	45	40	2591:05	22	16	4	102	2.36	1270	.920	1	0	2	0
Robin Lehner	21	21	1164:05	5	9	5	48	2.47	634	.924	1	0	1	8
Linus Ullmark	20	20	1130:40	8	10	2	49	2.60	565	.913	0	0	0	0
Jason Kasdorf	1	1	60:00	0	1	0	4	4.00	30	.867	0	0	0	0

^{†}Denotes player spent time with another team before joining the Sabres. Stats reflect time with the Sabres only.
^{‡}Denotes player was traded mid-season. Stats reflect time with the Sabres only.
Bold/italics denotes franchise record.

== Awards and honours ==
=== Awards ===
Regular season
Player	Award	Awarded
R. O'Reilly	NHL All-Star game selection	January 6, 2016
J. Eichel	NHL Third Star of the Week	February 1, 2016

=== Milestones ===
Regular season
Player	Milestone	Reached
J. Eichel	1st Career NHL Game; 1st Career NHL Goal	October 8, 2015
J. McCabe	1st Career NHL Goal	October 15, 2015
S. Reinhart	1st Career NHL Goal	October 17, 2015
L. Ullmark	1st Career NHL Game	October 24, 2015
M. Foligno	200th Career NHL Game	October 27, 2015
L. Ullmark	1st Career NHL Win	October 30, 2015
J. Eichel	1st Career NHL Assist	November 7, 2015
M. Moulson	500th Career NHL Game	December 4, 2015
R. Ristolainen	1st Career NHL Hat Trick	December 10, 2015
R. O'Reilly	100th Career NHL Goal	December 12, 2015
J. McGinn	400th Career NHL Game	December 19, 2015
J. Larsson	100th Career NHL Game	December 26, 2015
S. Reinhart	1st Career NHL Hat Trick	January 10, 2016
D. Catenacci	1st Career NHL Game	February 6, 2016
J. Bailey	1st Career NHL Game	February 11, 2016
H. Fasching	1st Career NHL Game; 1st Career NHL Goal	March 26, 2016
C. Nelson	1st Career NHL Game; 1st Career NHL Assist	March 26, 2016
C. Schneider	1st Career NHL Game	April 8, 2016
E. Rodrigues	1st Career NHL Game	April 8, 2016
J. Kasdorf	1st Career NHL Game	April 8, 2016
E. Rodrigues	1st Career NHL Goal; 1st Career NHL Assist	April 9, 2016
H. Fasching	1st Career NHL Assist	April 9, 2016
J. Gorges	100th Career NHL Assist	April 9, 2016

== Transactions ==
The Sabres have been involved in the following transactions during the 2015–16 season:

=== Trades ===
Date	Details		Ref
June 26, 2015	To Ottawa Senators NYI's 1st-round pick in 2015	To Buffalo Sabres Robin Lehner; David Legwand
June 26, 2015	To Colorado Avalanche Nikita Zadorov; Mikhail Grigorenko; J. T. Compher; 2nd-round pick in 2015	To Buffalo Sabres Ryan O'Reilly; Jamie McGinn
February 23, 2016	To Washington Capitals Mike Weber^{[Note 1]}	To Buffalo Sabres 3rd-round pick in 2017
February 27, 2016	To Ottawa Senators Phil Varone; Jason Akeson; Jerome Leduc	To Buffalo Sabres Cole Schneider; Eric O'Dell; Alex Guptill; Michael Sdao
February 29, 2016	To Anaheim Ducks Jamie McGinn	To Buffalo Sabres conditional 3rd-round pick in 2016^{[Note 2]}
June 20, 2016	To Nashville Predators MIN's 3rd-round pick in 2016	To Buffalo Sabres Jimmy Vesey (rights)

Notes

- ^{Note 1} Buffalo to retain 50% ($1.67 million) of salary as part of trade.
- ^{Note 2} Conditional 3rd-round pick will become 2nd-round pick in 2017 NHL entry draft if Ducks advance to 2016 Western Conference Finals and McGinn plays in 50% of playoff games in first two rounds.

=== Free agents acquired ===
Date	Player	Former team	Contract terms (in U.S. dollars)	Ref
July 1, 2015	Jason Akeson	Philadelphia Flyers	1 year (2-way), $575,000	
July 1, 2015	Matt Donovan	New York Islanders	1 year (2-way), $825,000	
July 2, 2015	Bobby Sanguinetti	Vancouver Canucks	1 year (2-way), $600,000	
July 3, 2015	Cal O'Reilly	Utica Comets	2 years, $1,400,000	
July 3, 2015	Carlo Colaiacovo	Philadelphia Flyers	1 year, $900,000	
September 10, 2015	Cody Franson	Nashville Predators	2 years, $6.65 million	
March 22, 2016	Casey Nelson	Minnesota State University	entry-level contract	

=== Free agents lost ===
Date	Player	New team	Contract terms (in U.S. dollars)	Ref
July 1, 2015	Anders Lindback	Arizona Coyotes	1 years, $875,000	
July 1, 2015	Matt Hackett	Anaheim Ducks	2 years, $1.2 million	
July 1, 2015	Zac Dalpe	Minnesota Wild	1 year, $600,000	
July 1, 2015	Cody Hodgson	Nashville Predators	1 year, $1.05 million	
July 2, 2015	Tyson Strachan	Minnesota Wild	1 year, $650,000	
July 6, 2015	Andre Benoit	St. Louis Blues	1 year, $750,000	
June 27, 2016	Andrey Makarov	Spartak Moscow	2 years	

=== Claimed via waivers ===
Player	Previous team	Date claimed off waivers	Ref

=== Lost via waivers ===
Player	New team	Date claimed off waivers	Ref

=== Lost via retirement ===
Player	Ref
Cody McCormick	

=== Players released ===
Date	Player	Via	Ref
July 1, 2015	Cody Hodgson	Buyout	

=== Player signings ===
Date	Player	Contract terms (in U.S. dollars)	Ref
July 1, 2015	Jack Eichel	3 years, entry-level contract	
July 3, 2015	Ryan O'Reilly	7 years, $52.5 million contract extension	
July 13, 2015	Phil Varone	1 year, $600,000, two-way contract	
July 14, 2015	Mark Pysyk	2 years, $2.25 million	
July 21, 2015	Johan Larsson	1 year, $800,000	
July 23, 2015	Jerry D'Amigo	1 year, $700,000, two-way contract	
July 27, 2015	Brendan Guhle	3 years, entry-level contract	
March 14, 2016	Jason Kasdorf	entry-level contract	
March 21, 2016	Hudson Fasching	entry-level contract	
March 25, 2016	Eric Cornel	entry-level contract	
April 29, 2016	Johan Larsson	1 year	
May 21, 2016	Brycen Martin	3 years, entry-level contract	
May 26, 2016	Vaclav Karabacek	3 years, entry-level contract	
June 20, 2016	Nicolas Deslauriers	2 years, contract extension	

== Draft picks ==
Below are the Buffalo Sabres' selections at the 2015 NHL entry draft, held on June 26–27, 2015 at the BB&T Center in Sunrise, Florida.

Round	#	Player	Pos	Nationality	College/Junior/Club team (League)
1	2	Jack Eichel	C	United States	Boston University (Hockey East)
2	51^{[b]}	Brendan Guhle	D	Canada	Prince Albert Raiders (WHL)
4	92	William Borgen	D	United States	Moorhead Spuds (HS-Minnesota)
5	122	Devante Stephens	D	Canada	Kelowna Rockets (WHL)
6	152	Georgio Estephan	C	Canada	Lethbridge Hurricanes (WHL)
7	182	Ivan Chukarov	D	United States	Minnesota Wilderness (NAHL)

Draft notes

- The Buffalo Sabres' second-round pick went to the San Jose Sharks as the result of a trade on June 27, 2015 that sent a second-round pick in 2015 (39th overall), Colorado's second-round pick in 2016 and Colorado's sixth-round pick in 2017 to Colorado in exchange for this pick.
  Colorado previously acquired this pick from as the result of a trade on June 26, 2015 that sent Ryan O'Reilly and Jamie McGinn to Buffalo in exchange for Nikita Zadorov, Mikhail Grigorenko, J.T. Compher and this pick.
- ^{b} The New York Islanders' second-round pick went to the Buffalo Sabres as the result of a trade on October 27, 2013 that sent Thomas Vanek to New York in exchange for Matt Moulson, a conditional first-round pick in 2014 and this pick.
- The Buffalo Sabres' third-round pick went to the Washington Capitals as the result of a trade on March 5, 2014 that sent Michal Neuvirth and Rostislav Klesla to Buffalo in exchange for Jaroslav Halak and this pick.
