= Michael Keränen =

Swedish-born Finnish ice hockey player

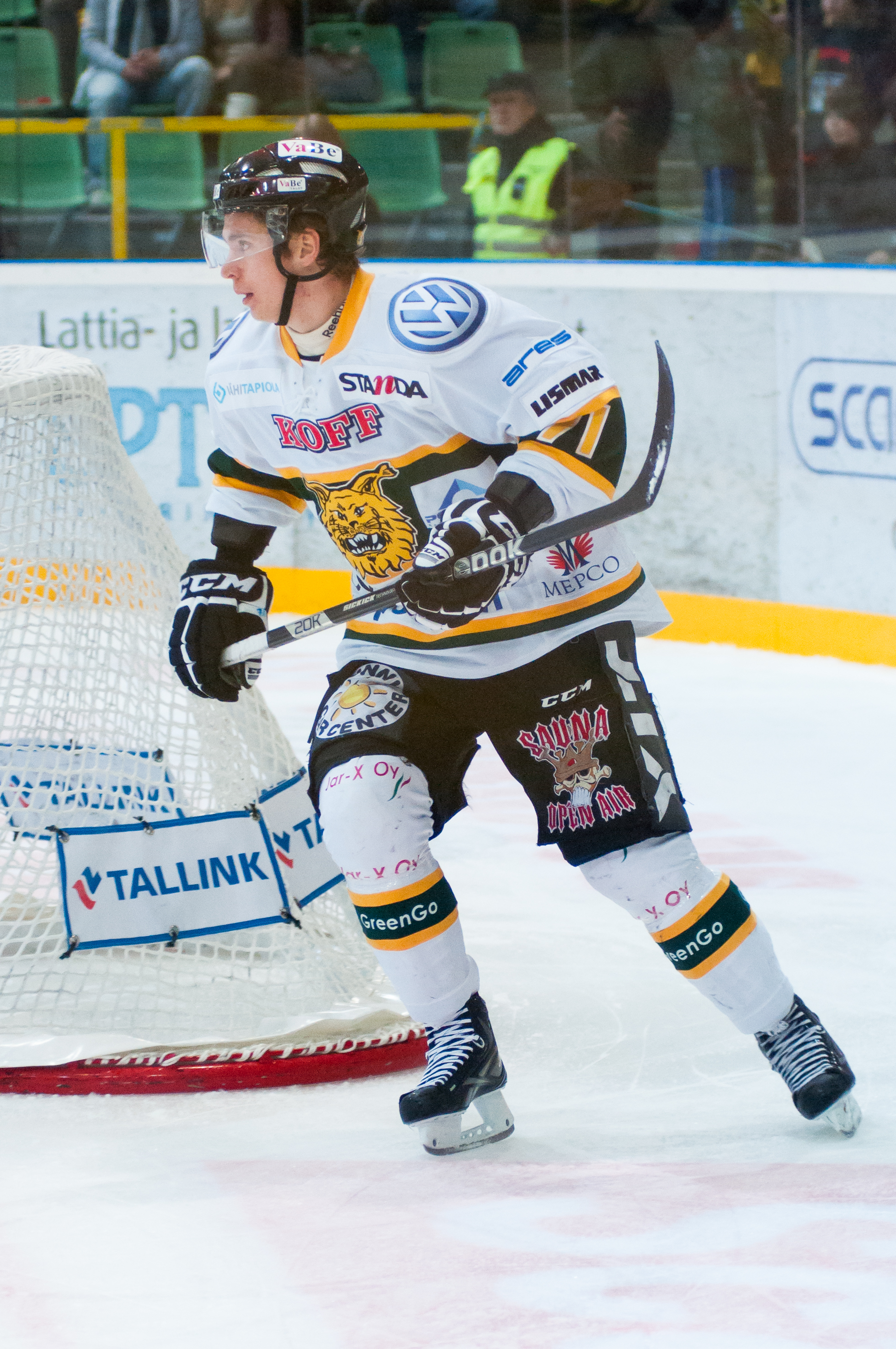
- Born: 4 January 1990 (age 36) Stockholm, Sweden
- Height: 6 ft 1 in (185 cm)
- Weight: 176 lb (80 kg; 12 st 8 lb)
- Position: Forward
- Shoots: Left
- DEL team Former teams: Bietigheim Steelers; Ilves; Minnesota Wild; Jokerit; KooKoo; Genève-Servette HC; Mora IK; HIFK; Vaasan Sport
- National team: Finland
- NHL draft: Undrafted
- Playing career: 2010–present

Michael Keränen (born 4 January 1990) is a Finnish professional ice hockey forward who is currently playing with Bietigheim Steelers in the Deutsche Eishockey Liga (DEL).

== Playing career ==
Undrafted, Keränen first played as a youth in his native Finland with Tappara before moving to Ilves as a 17-year-old. Keränen made his professional debut in the SM-liiga with Ilves after the 2009–10 season. After his fifth season with Ilves, in which he led the team in scoring with 52 points in as many games, Keränen initially signed as a free agent on a one-year contract with rival Finnish Liiga club HIFK on 30 April 2014.

A little over a month later, Keränen exercised his NHL out clause to leave HIFK and sign his first NHL contract on a one-year, two-way deal with the Minnesota Wild on 5 June 2014.

In the following 2015–16 season, Keränen returned to the Iowa Wild for a second season. He was leading Iowa in goals when, on 17 November 2015, he received his first recall to the Wild. Making his NHL debut later that night against the Pittsburgh Penguins. He was promptly returned to the AHL and on 29 February 2016, he was dealt by the Minnesota Wild, executing a minor league trade deadline deal, to the Ottawa Senators in return for defenseman Conor Allen.

On 28 April 2016, Keränen ended his North American tenure by agreeing to return to Finland in signing a two-year contract with Jokerit of the KHL. Keränen and Jokerit parted ways by mutual consent in late November 2016. He had appeared in 25 KHL contests for the club, with two goals and five assists. On 6 December 2016, he returned to Ilves, where he once had made his Liiga debut.

Near the end of the 2017–18 season, with 5 games remaining in the regular season with KooKoo, Keränen -who was their leading scorer despite having missed 20 games- decided to leave the team with no playoffs hopes and joined Genève-Servette HC of the National League on a one-year contract worth CHF 700,000 for the remainder of the season to help Geneva make a playoff push. Keranen was paid CHF 175,000 for this contract. He eventually appeared in three games with Geneva, scoring one goal, and left the team in the summer to join Mora IK of the Swedish Hockey League.

On 3 September 2019, Keränen returned to Switzerland in the second division, to play for EHC Visp of the Swiss League. He was brought in to replace injured Mark Van Guilder and Troy Josephs.

== Career statistics ==
			Regular season					Playoffs
Season	Team	League	GP	G	A	Pts	PIM	GP	G	A	Pts	PIM
2006–07	Tappara	FIN U18	30	1	5	6	26	—	—	—	—	—
2007–08	Ilves	FIN U18 Q	9	5	9	14	8	—	—	—	—	—
2007–08	Ilves	FIN U18	26	8	19	27	22	—	—	—	—	—
2007–08	Ilves	FIN U20	1	0	0	0	0	—	—	—	—	—
2008–09	Ilves	FIN U20	35	6	6	12	22	—	—	—	—	—
2009–10	Ilves	FIN U20	41	22	28	50	50	9	4	7	11	6
2009–10	Ilves	SM-l	1	0	0	0	0	—	—	—	—	—
2010–11	Ilves	FIN U20	4	3	4	7	0	6	4	2	6	2
2010–11	Ilves	SM-l	42	5	6	11	45	—	—	—	—	—
2010–11	LeKi	Mestis	9	7	4	11	4	—	—	—	—	—
2011–12	Ilves	SM-l	44	6	5	11	20	—	—	—	—	—
2012–13	Ilves	SM-l	56	13	14	27	10	—	—	—	—	—
2013–14	Ilves	Liiga	52	17	35	52	47	—	—	—	—	—
2014–15	Iowa Wild	AHL	70	10	27	37	22	—	—	—	—	—
2015–16	Iowa Wild	AHL	45	8	15	23	22	—	—	—	—	—
2015–16	Minnesota Wild	NHL	1	0	0	0	0	—	—	—	—	—
2015–16	Binghamton Senators	AHL	21	4	3	7	13	—	—	—	—	—
2016–17	Jokerit	KHL	25	2	5	7	6	—	—	—	—	—
2016–17	Ilves	Liiga	31	7	6	13	14	10	1	2	3	4
2017–18	KooKoo	Liiga	39	16	22	38	24	—	—	—	—	—
2017–18	Genève-Servette HC	NL	1	1	0	1	0	2	0	0	0	0
2018–19	Mora IK	SHL	45	6	14	20	24	—	—	—	—	—
2019–20	EHC Visp	SL	3	1	1	2	0	—	—	—	—	—
2019–20	HIFK	Liiga	34	13	7	20	16	—	—	—	—	—
2020–21	Vaasan Sport	Liiga	27	9	10	19	10	—	—	—	—	—
2021–22	Vaasan Sport	Liiga	45	7	11	18	41	—	—	—	—	—
2022–23	Bietigheim Steelers	DEL	42	9	11	20	16	—	—	—	—	—
Liiga totals			371	93	116	209	227	10	1	2	3	4
NHL totals			1	0	0	0	0	—	—	—	—	—

== Awards and honours ==
Award	Year
Liiga
Golden Helmet	2013–14
Lasse Oksanen Award	2013–14
