= Conor Allen =

American ice hockey defenseman (born 1990)

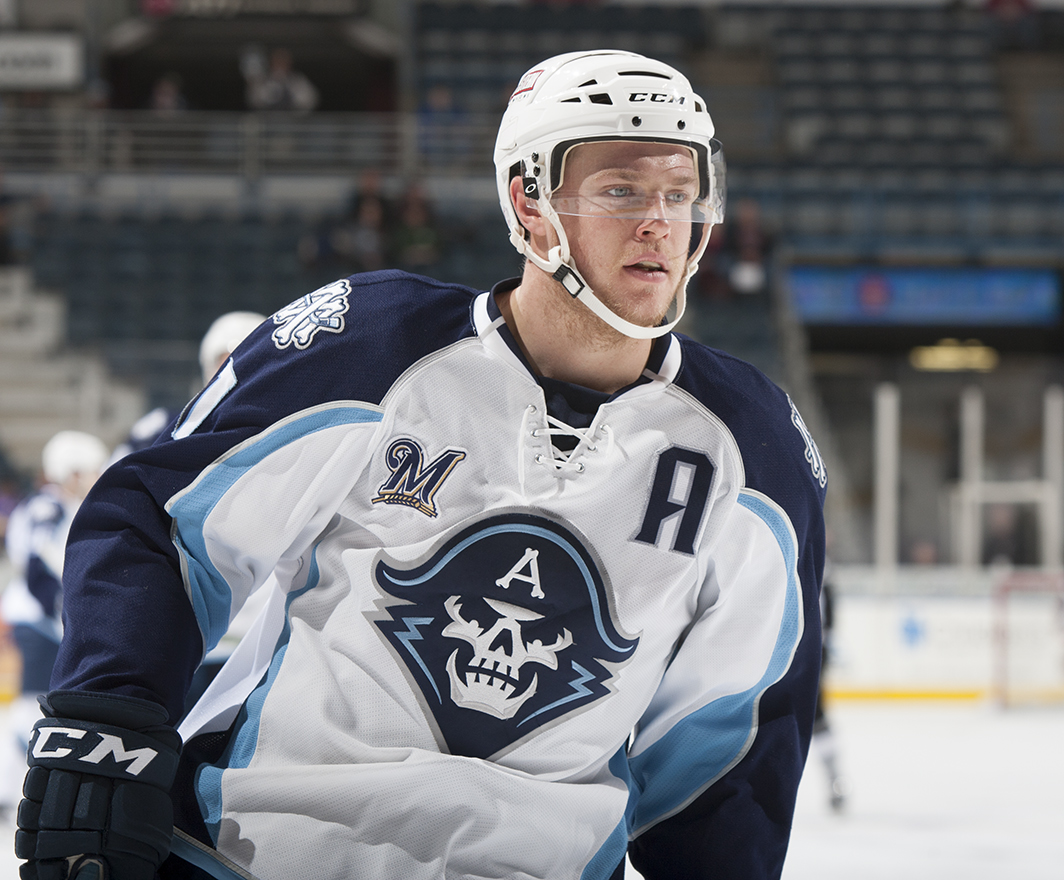
- Allen with the Milwaukee Admirals in 2015
- Born: January 31, 1990 (age 36) Chicago, Illinois, U.S.
- Height: 6 ft 2 in (188 cm)
- Weight: 210 lb (95 kg; 15 st 0 lb)
- Position: Defense
- Shot: Left
- Played for: New York Rangers; Grizzlys Wolfsburg; HC Plzeň; Mountfield HK; Motor České Budějovice; BK Mladá Boleslav
- NHL draft: Undrafted
- Playing career: 2013–2021

Conor Jay Allen (born January 31, 1990) is an American former professional ice hockey defenseman. He played with the New York Rangers of the National Hockey League (NHL).

== Playing career ==
Before his enrollment at UMass Amherst, Allen played his junior hockey with the Sioux Falls Stampede of the United States Hockey League (USHL) as was a graduate of The Latin School of Chicago. He played NCAA Division I hockey with UMass Amherst in the Hockey East conference. Allen was signed to a two-year entry-level contract as an undrafted free agent by the New York Rangers in March 2013, and was assigned to the club's AHL affiliate, the Connecticut Whale.

On December 28, 2013, Allen was called up for the first time from Hartford to the Rangers, and played his first NHL game on December 29, 2013, logging 16 minutes against the Tampa Bay Lightning, in a game the Rangers won 4 – 3. After the game, the Ranger's Coach Vigneault noted that Allen was "poised with the puck, wasn't afraid to take a hit to make a play, and that's why he got that ice time." Within a week, Allen played his second and third NHL games with the Rangers—December 31 against the Florida Panthers and January 3, 2014 against the Pittsburgh Penguins.

On November 7, 2014, Allen was called up to the Rangers for the first time in the 2014 season due to injuries in the Rangers' defensive core. Allen was primarily paired with fellow UMass Amherst alum Michael Kostka in his time with the NHL club.

On July 2, 2015, Allen as a free agent signed a one-year, two-way contract with the Nashville Predators. After attending the Predators training camp, Allen was assigned to AHL affiliate, the Milwaukee Admirals to begin the 2015–16 season. After 31 games with the Admirals, Allen was traded by the Predators to the Ottawa Senators in exchange for Patrick Mullen on January 14, 2016. Allen played 17 games with AHL affiliate, the Binghamton Senators before in a quick turnaround, on February 29, 2016, Ottawa traded Allen to the Minnesota Wild in return for forward Michael Keranen.

On August 18, 2016, Allen signed a one-year contract with the Grand Rapids Griffins, the American Hockey League (AHL) affiliate of the Detroit Red Wings. In the 2016–17 season, Allen appeared in 56 regular season games with the Griffins in contributing 11 points. He did not feature in the post-season through injury as the Griffins claimed their second Calder Cup in franchise history.

As a free agent in the following off-season, Allen opted to continue in the AHL after securing a one-year contract with the Rochester Americans on August 30, 2017. He was released from his contract on February 6, 2018. He was signed by Grizzlys Wolfsburg of Germany's Deutsche Eishockey Liga the same day.

== Career statistics ==
			Regular season					Playoffs
Season	Team	League	GP	G	A	Pts	PIM	GP	G	A	Pts	PIM
2008–09	St. Louis Bandits	NAHL	46	5	10	15	48	12	1	4	5	15
2009–10	Sioux Falls Stampede	USHL	48	7	8	15	69	—	—	—	—	—
2010–11	UMass-Amherst	HE	31	2	4	6	29	—	—	—	—	—
2011–12	UMass-Amherst	HE	35	7	7	14	28	—	—	—	—	—
2012–13	UMass-Amherst	HE	33	5	14	19	53	—	—	—	—	—
2012–13	Connecticut Whale	AHL	1	0	0	0	0	—	—	—	—	—
2013–14	Hartford Wolf Pack	AHL	72	6	25	31	71	—	—	—	—	—
2013–14	New York Rangers	NHL	3	0	0	0	0	—	—	—	—	—
2014–15	Hartford Wolf Pack	AHL	72	11	23	34	113	12	1	1	2	10
2014–15	New York Rangers	NHL	4	0	0	0	4	—	—	—	—	—
2015–16	Milwaukee Admirals	AHL	31	1	5	6	52	—	—	—	—	—
2015–16	Binghamton Senators	AHL	17	1	4	5	10	—	—	—	—	—
2015–16	Iowa Wild	AHL	18	1	2	3	6	—	—	—	—	—
2016–17	Grand Rapids Griffins	AHL	56	1	10	11	49	—	—	—	—	—
2017–18	Rochester Americans	AHL	17	1	2	3	8	—	—	—	—	—
2017–18	Grizzlys Wolfsburg	DEL	3	0	0	0	4	7	2	2	4	2
2018–19	HC Plzeň	ELH	49	9	5	14	94	12	2	2	4	34
2019–20	Mountfield HK	ELH	8	0	3	3	2	—	—	—	—	—
2019–20	Motor České Budějovice	Czech.1	33	3	7	10	118	—	—	—	—	—
2020–21	Motor České Budějovice	ELH	21	2	1	3	8	—	—	—	—	—
2020–21	BK Mladá Boleslav	ELH	24	3	4	7	8	—	—	—	—	—
NHL totals			7	0	0	0	4	—	—	—	—	—

== Honours and achievements ==
Award	Year	Ref
College
HE All-Academic Team	2011	
AHL
Calder Cup (Grand Rapids Griffins)	2017	
