= Tyson Strachan =

Canadian ice hockey player (born 1984)

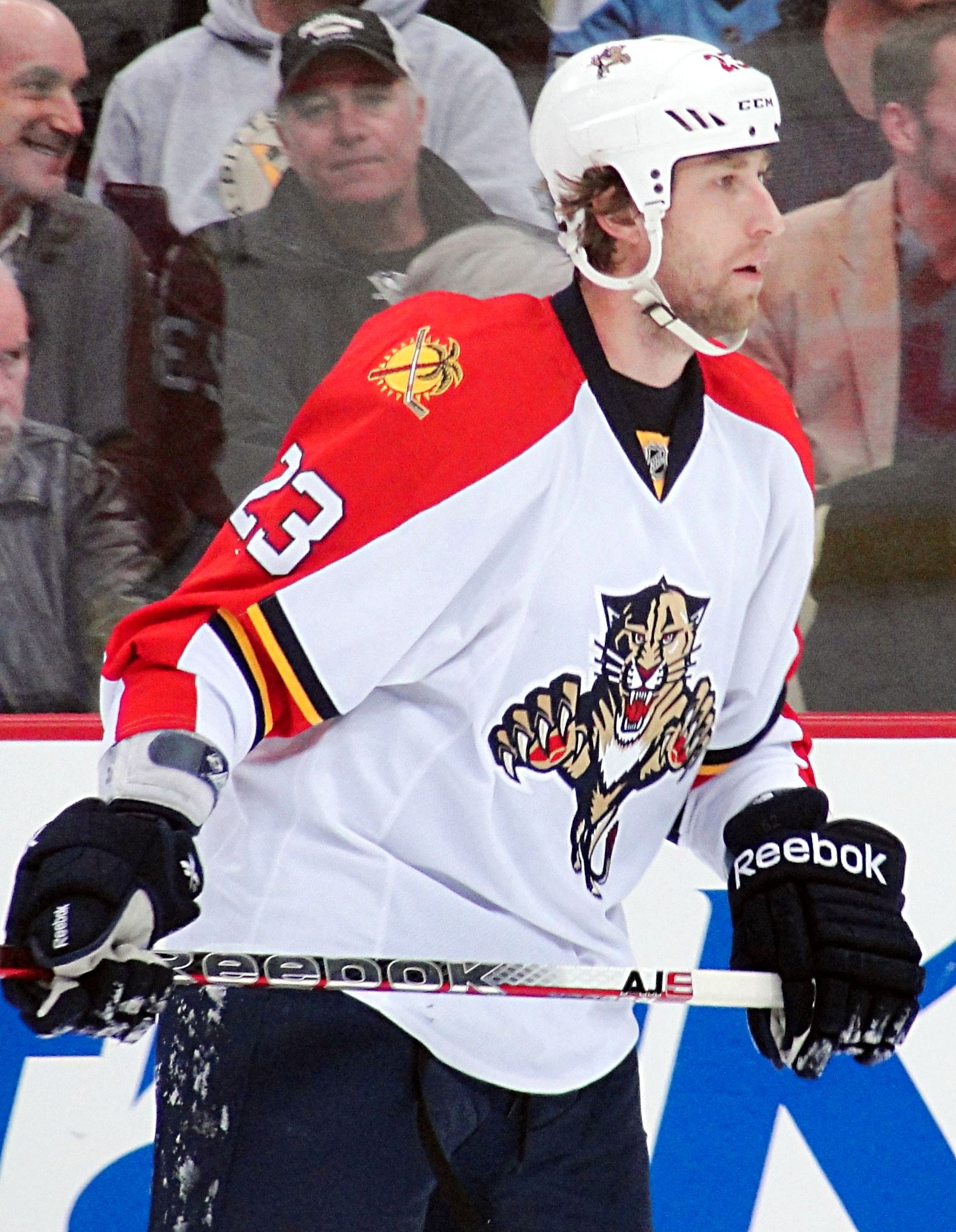
- Born: October 30, 1984 (age 41) Melfort, Saskatchewan, Canada
- Height: 6 ft 3 in (191 cm)
- Weight: 210 lb (95 kg; 15 st 0 lb)
- Position: Defence
- Shot: Right
- Played for: St. Louis Blues; Florida Panthers; Washington Capitals; Buffalo Sabres; Minnesota Wild; Cardiff Devils
- NHL draft: 137th overall, 2003; Carolina Hurricanes
- Playing career: 2007–2018

Tyson Strachan (born October 30, 1984) is a Canadian former professional ice hockey defenceman. He most recently played for the Cardiff Devils in the EIHL. He was drafted by the Carolina Hurricanes in the fifth round, 137th overall, in the 2003 NHL entry draft.

== Playing career ==
He played at Ohio State University for four seasons (2003–07), and with the Albany River Rats in the American Hockey League in 2006-07 for one game, before joining the Peoria Rivermen (AHL) and Las Vegas Wranglers (ECHL) in 2007-08.

He was signed as a free agent by the St. Louis Blues on October 9, 2008. During the 2008–09 season he was recalled from the Peoria Rivermen under emergency conditions on December 16, 2008, after playing in two pre-season games with the Blues and 28 games for the Rivermen. He made his NHL debut on December 18, against the Washington Capitals at Washington and three nights later scored his first NHL Point (assist) on December 21 against the Boston Bruins, at St. Louis.

On July 12, 2011, Strachan agreed to one-year, two-way deal with Florida Panthers. On January 23, 2012, he was called up to replace injured defenceman Dmitri Kulikov. On February 1, 2012, he recorded his 1st point as a Panther with an assist on a Mikael Samuelsson goal. He recorded his 1st career goal on February 12, 2012 against Evgeni Nabokov of the New York Islanders.

On July 8, 2013, Strachan agreed to one-year, two-way deal as a free agent with the Washington Capitals. He was originally assigned to AHL affiliate, the Hershey Bears, before he was recalled and featured in 18 games over the course of the 2013–14 season with the Capitals.

On July 3, 2014, Strachan signed as a free agent with the Buffalo Sabres on a one-year, two-way contract.

On July 2, 2015, having left the Sabres as a free agent, Strachan signed a one-year, two-way contract with the Minnesota Wild. He was primarily assigned to AHL affiliate, the Iowa Wild, appearing in 67 games and providing 13 points in the 2015–16 season. He was recalled by the Wild on numerous occasions however featured in 2 scoreless games.

As a free agent in the following summer, Strachan was unable to attain an NHL deal. On September 14, 2016, he agreed to a one-year AHL deal with the Rochester Americans, affiliate to his former club the Buffalo Sabres. He featured in 61 games with the Americans, contributing 1 goal and 12 points.

On September 7, 2017, with ambition to return to the NHL, Strachan agreed to attend the Arizona Coyotes training camp on a professional try-out contract.

On October 18, 2017 Strachan signed for the Cardiff Devils in the EIHL. In the 2017–18 season, Strachan was a regular on the blueline for the Devils, appearing in 47 games for 15 points and helping claim the EIHL championship.

== Career statistics ==
| | | | Regular season | | | | | Playoffs |
| Season | Team | League | GP | G | A | Pts | PIM | GP | G | A | Pts | PIM |
|---|---|---|---|---|---|---|---|---|---|---|---|---|
| 2000–01 | Tisdale U18 AA | CFHL | 21 | 22 | 30 | 52 | 90 | — | — | — | — | — |
| 2001–02 | Tisdale Trojans AAA | SMHL | 42 | 5 | 18 | 23 | 70 | — | — | — | — | — |
| 2001–02 | Melfort Mustangs | SJHL | 3 | 0 | 0 | 0 | 2 | — | — | — | — | — |
| 2002–03 | Vernon Vipers | BCHL | 56 | 6 | 22 | 28 | 99 | — | — | — | — | — |
| 2003–04 | Ohio State University | CCHA | 30 | 2 | 5 | 7 | 8 | — | — | — | — | — |
| 2004–05 | Ohio State University | CCHA | 31 | 1 | 4 | 5 | 32 | — | — | — | — | — |
| 2005–06 | Ohio State University | CCHA | 23 | 3 | 2 | 5 | 37 | — | — | — | — | — |
| 2006–07 | Ohio State University | CCHA | 35 | 7 | 11 | 18 | 55 | — | — | — | — | — |
| 2006–07 | Albany River Rats | AHL | 1 | 0 | 0 | 0 | 0 | — | — | — | — | — |
| 2007–08 | Las Vegas Wranglers | ECHL | 25 | 2 | 7 | 9 | 68 | 16 | 0 | 4 | 4 | 12 |
| 2007–08 | Peoria Rivermen | AHL | 34 | 1 | 2 | 3 | 61 | — | — | — | — | — |
| 2008–09 | Peoria Rivermen | AHL | 29 | 2 | 3 | 5 | 67 | 3 | 0 | 0 | 0 | 11 |
| 2008–09 | St. Louis Blues | NHL | 30 | 0 | 3 | 3 | 39 | — | — | — | — | — |
| 2009–10 | Peoria Rivermen | AHL | 65 | 5 | 21 | 26 | 75 | — | — | — | — | — |
| 2009–10 | St. Louis Blues | NHL | 8 | 0 | 2 | 2 | 4 | — | — | — | — | — |
| 2010–11 | St. Louis Blues | NHL | 29 | 0 | 1 | 1 | 39 | — | — | — | — | — |
| 2010–11 | Peoria Rivermen | AHL | 13 | 0 | 8 | 8 | 4 | 1 | 0 | 0 | 0 | 2 |
| 2011–12 | San Antonio Rampage | AHL | 50 | 3 | 14 | 17 | 41 | 7 | 1 | 3 | 4 | 0 |
| 2011–12 | Florida Panthers | NHL | 15 | 1 | 2 | 3 | 5 | 2 | 0 | 1 | 1 | 0 |
| 2012–13 | San Antonio Rampage | AHL | 24 | 1 | 8 | 9 | 22 | — | — | — | — | — |
| 2012–13 | Florida Panthers | NHL | 38 | 0 | 4 | 4 | 40 | — | — | — | — | — |
| 2013–14 | Hershey Bears | AHL | 60 | 4 | 15 | 19 | 56 | — | — | — | — | — |
| 2013–14 | Washington Capitals | NHL | 18 | 0 | 2 | 2 | 28 | — | — | — | — | — |
| 2014–15 | Buffalo Sabres | NHL | 46 | 0 | 5 | 5 | 44 | — | — | — | — | — |
| 2015–16 | Iowa Wild | AHL | 67 | 1 | 12 | 13 | 68 | — | — | — | — | — |
| 2015–16 | Minnesota Wild | NHL | 2 | 0 | 0 | 0 | 0 | — | — | — | — | — |
| 2016–17 | Rochester Americans | AHL | 61 | 1 | 11 | 12 | 36 | — | — | — | — | — |
| 2017–18 | Cardiff Devils | EIHL | 47 | 4 | 11 | 15 | 73 | 4 | 1 | 3 | 4 | 0 |
| AHL totals | | | 404 | 18 | 94 | 112 | 430 | 11 | 1 | 3 | 4 | 13 |
| NHL totals | | | 186 | 1 | 19 | 20 | 199 | 2 | 0 | 1 | 1 | 0 |
