= 2015–16 Washington Capitals season =

NHL ice hockey team season

2015–16 Washington Capitals
- Presidents' Trophy winners
- Metropolitan Division champions
- Division: 1st Metropolitan
- Conference: 1st Eastern
- 2015–16 record: 56–18–8
- Home record: 29–8–4
- Road record: 27–10–4
- Goals for: 252
- Goals against: 193

Team information
- General manager: Brian MacLellan
- Coach: Barry Trotz
- Captain: Alexander Ovechkin
- Alternate captains: Nicklas Backstrom; Brooks Orpik
- Arena: Verizon Center
- Average attendance: 18,509 (27 games)
- Minor league affiliates: Hershey Bears (AHL); South Carolina Stingrays (ECHL)

Team leaders
- Goals: Alexander Ovechkin (50)
- Assists: Evgeny Kuznetsov (57)
- Points: Evgeny Kuznetsov (77)
- Penalty minutes: Tom Wilson (163)
- Plus/minus: Evgeny Kuznetsov (+27)
- Wins: Braden Holtby (48)
- Goals against average: Braden Holtby (2.20)

The 2015–16 Washington Capitals season was the 42nd season for the National Hockey League (NHL) franchise that was established on June 11, 1974. The season began its regular games on October 10, 2015, against the New Jersey Devils. This was the first of five consecutive Metropolitan Division titles for the Capitals. The 2015–16 Capitals team was the second one in franchise history to win the Presidents' Trophy, after the 2009–10 Capitals team. The Capitals defeated the Philadelphia Flyers in the first round of the playoffs. However, they were eliminated in the second round of the playoffs, two games to four, by the eventual Stanley Cup champions Pittsburgh Penguins.

== Standings ==
Metropolitan Division
| Pos | Team | GP | W | L | OTL | ROW | GF | GA | GD | Pts |
|---|---|---|---|---|---|---|---|---|---|---|
| 1 | p – Washington Capitals | 82 | 56 | 18 | 8 | 52 | 252 | 193 | +59 | 120 |
| 2 | x – Pittsburgh Penguins | 82 | 48 | 26 | 8 | 44 | 245 | 203 | +42 | 104 |
| 3 | x – New York Rangers | 82 | 46 | 27 | 9 | 43 | 236 | 217 | +19 | 101 |
| 4 | x – New York Islanders | 82 | 45 | 27 | 10 | 40 | 232 | 216 | +16 | 100 |
| 5 | x – Philadelphia Flyers | 82 | 41 | 27 | 14 | 38 | 214 | 218 | −4 | 96 |
| 6 | Carolina Hurricanes | 82 | 35 | 31 | 16 | 33 | 198 | 226 | −28 | 86 |
| 7 | New Jersey Devils | 82 | 38 | 36 | 8 | 36 | 184 | 208 | −24 | 84 |
| 8 | Columbus Blue Jackets | 82 | 34 | 40 | 8 | 28 | 219 | 252 | −33 | 76 |

Source: National Hockey League
p – Clinched Presidents' Trophy; x – Clinched playoff spot

== Schedule and results ==
=== Pre-season ===
2015 preseason game log: 5–0–2 (Home: 3–0–0; Road: 2–0–2)
| # | Date | Visitor | Score | Home | OT | Decision | Attendance | Record | Recap |
|---|---|---|---|---|---|---|---|---|---|
| 1 | September 21 | Carolina | 0–2 | Washington | | Holtby | 15,955 | 1–0–0 | Recap |
| 2 | September 22 | Washington | 1–2 | Boston | OT | Grubauer | 16,460 | 1–0–1 | Recap |
| 3 | September 24 | Washington | 4–3 | Montreal | SO | Ellis | 21,287 | 2–0–1 | Recap |
| 4 | September 28 | Washington | 3–1 | NY Islanders | | Peters | –– | 3–0–1 | Recap |
| 5 | September 30 | Washington | 3–4 | Carolina | SO | Peters | 6,256 | 3–0–2 | Recap |
| 6 | October 2 | Boston | 1–2 | Washington | SO | Holtby | 16,243 | 4–0–2 | Recap |
| 7 | October 4 | NY Islanders | 2–6 | Washington | | Holtby | 16,073 | 5–0–2 | Recap |

=== Regular season ===
2015–16 game log

October: 8–2–0 (Home: 4–2–0; Road: 4–0–0)
| # | Date | Visitor | Score | Home | OT | Decision | Attendance | Record | Pts | Recap |
|---|---|---|---|---|---|---|---|---|---|---|
| 1 | October 10 | New Jersey | 3–5 | Washington | | Holtby | 18,506 | 1–0–0 | 2 | Recap |
| 2 | October 13 | San Jose | 5–0 | Washington | | Holtby | 18,506 | 1–1–0 | 2 | Recap |
| 3 | October 15 | Chicago | 1–4 | Washington | | Holtby | 18,506 | 2–1–0 | 4 | Recap |
| 4 | October 17 | Carolina | 1–4 | Washington | | Holtby | 18,506 | 3–1–0 | 6 | Recap |
| 5 | October 20 | Washington | 6–2 | Calgary | | Holtby | 18,303 | 4–1–0 | 8 | Recap |
| 6 | October 22 | Washington | 3–2 | Vancouver | | Holtby | 18,188 | 5–1–0 | 10 | Recap |
| 7 | October 23 | Washington | 7–4 | Edmonton | | Grubauer | 16,839 | 6–1–0 | 12 | Recap |
| 8 | October 28 | Pittsburgh | 3–1 | Washington | | Holtby | 18,506 | 6–2–0 | 12 | Recap |
| 9 | October 30 | Columbus | 1–2 | Washington | | Holtby | 18,506 | 7–2–0 | 14 | Recap |
| 10 | October 31 | Washington | 2–1 | Florida | OT | Grubauer | 11,207 | 8–2–0 | 16 | Recap |

November: 9–3–1 (Home: 6–1–1; Road: 3–2–0)
| # | Date | Visitor | Score | Home | OT | Decision | Attendance | Record | Pts | Recap |
|---|---|---|---|---|---|---|---|---|---|---|
| 11 | November 3 | Washington | 2–5 | NY Rangers | | Holtby | 18,006 | 8–3–0 | 16 | Recap |
| 12 | November 5 | Boston | 1–4 | Washington | | Holtby | 18,506 | 9–3–0 | 18 | Recap |
| 13 | November 7 | Toronto | 2–3 | Washington | SO | Holtby | 18,506 | 10–3–0 | 20 | Recap |
| 14 | November 10 | Washington | 0–1 | Detroit | | Holtby | 20,027 | 10–4–0 | 20 | Recap |
| 15 | November 12 | Washington | 5–2 | Philadelphia | | Holtby | 19,414 | 11–4–0 | 22 | Recap |
| 16 | November 13 | Calgary | 3–2 | Washington | OT | Grubauer | 18,506 | 11–4–1 | 23 | Recap |
| 17 | November 18 | Washington | 2–1 | Detroit | OT | Holtby | 20,027 | 12–4–1 | 25 | Recap |
| 18 | November 19 | Dallas | 3–2 | Washington | | Grubauer | 18,506 | 12–5–1 | 25 | Recap |
| 19 | November 21 | Colorado | 3–7 | Washington | | Holtby | 18,506 | 13–5–1 | 27 | Recap |
| 20 | November 23 | Edmonton | 0–1 | Washington | | Holtby | 18,506 | 14–5–1 | 29 | Recap |
| 21 | November 25 | Winnipeg | 3–5 | Washington | | Holtby | 18,506 | 15–5–1 | 31 | Recap |
| 22 | November 27 | Tampa Bay | 2–4 | Washington | | Holtby | 18,506 | 16–5–1 | 33 | Recap |
| 23 | November 28 | Washington | 4–2 | Toronto | | Holtby | 19,053 | 17–5–1 | 35 | Recap |

December: 11–2–1 (Home: 5–0–0; Road: 6–2–1)
| # | Date | Visitor | Score | Home | OT | Decision | Attendance | Record | Pts | Recap |
|---|---|---|---|---|---|---|---|---|---|---|
| 24 | December 3 | Washington | 3–2 | Montreal | | Holtby | 21,288 | 18–5–1 | 37 | Recap |
| 25 | December 5 | Washington | 1–2 | Winnipeg | OT | Holtby | 15,294 | 18–5–2 | 38 | Recap |
| 26 | December 8 | Detroit | 2–3 | Washington | SO | Holtby | 18,506 | 19–5–2 | 40 | Recap |
| 27 | December 10 | Washington | 1–4 | Florida | | Grubauer | 12,810 | 19–6–2 | 40 | Recap |
| 28 | December 12 | Washington | 2–1 | Tampa Bay | | Holtby | 19,092 | 20–6–2 | 42 | Recap |
| 29 | December 14 | Washington | 4–1 | Pittsburgh | | Holtby | 18,520 | 21–6–2 | 44 | Recap |
| 30 | December 16 | Ottawa | 1–2 | Washington | | Holtby | 18,506 | 22–6–2 | 46 | Recap |
| 31 | December 18 | Tampa Bay | 3–5 | Washington | | Grubauer | 18,506 | 23–6–2 | 48 | Recap |
| 32 | December 20 | Washington | 7–3 | NY Rangers | | Holtby | 18,006 | 24–6–2 | 50 | Recap |
| 33 | December 21 | Washington | 2–1 | Carolina | | Grubauer | 13,228 | 25–6–2 | 52 | Recap |
| 34 | December 26 | Montreal | 1–3 | Washington | | Holtby | 18,506 | 26–6–2 | 54 | Recap |
| 35 | December 28 | Washington | 2–0 | Buffalo | | Holtby | 19,070 | 27–6–2 | 56 | Recap |
| 36 | December 30 | Buffalo | 2–5 | Washington | | Holtby | 18,506 | 28–6–2 | 58 | Recap |
| 37 | December 31 | Washington | 2–4 | Carolina | | Grubauer | 14,134 | 28–7–2 | 58 | Recap |

January: 7–1–2 (Home: 3–0–1; Road: 4–1–1)
| # | Date | Visitor | Score | Home | OT | Decision | Attendance | Record | Pts | Recap |
|---|---|---|---|---|---|---|---|---|---|---|
| 38 | January 2 | Washington | 4–5 | Columbus | SO | Holtby | 17,170 | 28–7–3 | 59 | Recap |
| 39 | January 5 | Washington | 3–2 | Boston | | Holtby | 17,565 | 29–7–3 | 61 | Recap |
| 40 | January 7 | Washington | 4–1 | NY Islanders | | Holtby | 14,261 | 30–7–3 | 63 | Recap |
| 41 | January 9 | Washington | 4–3 | NY Rangers | OT | Holtby | 18,006 | 31–7–3 | 65 | Recap |
| 42 | January 10 | Ottawa | 1–7 | Washington | | Grubauer | 18,506 | 32–7–3 | 67 | Recap |
| 43 | January 14 | Vancouver | 1–4 | Washington | | Holtby | 18,506 | 33–7–3 | 69 | Recap |
| 44 | January 16 | Washington | 1–4 | Buffalo | | Holtby | 19,070 | 33–8–3 | 69 | Recap |
| 45 | January 17 | NY Rangers | 2–5 | Washington | | Holtby | 18,506 | 34–8–3 | 71 | Recap |
| 46 | January 19 | Washington | 6–3 | Columbus | | Holtby | 12,291 | 35–8–3 | 73 | Recap |
| – | January 22 | Anaheim | | Washington | Game rescheduled to April 10 due to hazardous weather. |
| – | January 24 | Pittsburgh | | Washington | Game rescheduled to March 1 due to hazardous weather. |
| 47 | January 27 | Philadelphia | 4–3 | Washington | OT | Holtby | 18,506 | 35–8–4 | 74 | Recap |

February: 10–4–0 (Home: 6–2–0; Road: 4–2–0)
| # | Date | Visitor | Score | Home | OT | Decision | Attendance | Record | Pts | Recap |
|---|---|---|---|---|---|---|---|---|---|---|
| 48 | February 2 | Florida | 5–2 | Washington | | Grubauer | 18,506 | 35–9–4 | 74 | Recap |
| 49 | February 4 | NY Islanders | 2–3 | Washington | | Holtby | 18,506 | 36–9–4 | 76 | Recap |
| 50 | February 6 | Washington | 3–2 | New Jersey | SO | Holtby | 16,514 | 37–9–4 | 78 | Recap |
| 51 | February 7 | Philadelphia | 2–3 | Washington | | Holtby | 18,506 | 38–9–4 | 80 | Recap |
| 52 | February 9 | Washington | 5–3 | Nashville | | Holtby | 17,113 | 39–9–4 | 82 | Recap |
| 53 | February 11 | Washington | 4–3 | Minnesota | | Holtby | 19,213 | 40–9–4 | 84 | Recap |
| 54 | February 13 | Washington | 3–4 | Dallas | | Holtby | 18,532 | 40–10–4 | 84 | Recap |
| 55 | February 16 | Los Angeles | 1–3 | Washington | | Grubauer | 18,506 | 41–10–4 | 86 | Recap |
| 56 | February 18 | Washington | 3–2 | NY Islanders | OT | Holtby | 15,795 | 42–10–4 | 88 | Recap |
| 57 | February 20 | New Jersey | 3–4 | Washington | | Holtby | 18,506 | 43–10–4 | 90 | Recap |
| 58 | February 22 | Arizona | 2–3 | Washington | | Holtby | 18,506 | 44–10–4 | 92 | Recap |
| 59 | February 24 | Montreal | 4–3 | Washington | | Grubauer | 18,506 | 44–11–4 | 92 | Recap |
| 60 | February 26 | Minnesota | 2–3 | Washington | | Holtby | 18,506 | 45–11–4 | 94 | Recap |
| 61 | February 28 | Washington | 2–3 | Chicago | | Holtby | 22,218 | 45–12–4 | 94 | Recap |

March: 9–4–2 (Home: 5–2–0; Road: 4–2–2)
| # | Date | Visitor | Score | Home | OT | Decision | Attendance | Record | Pts | Recap |
|---|---|---|---|---|---|---|---|---|---|---|
| 62 | March 1 | Pittsburgh | 2–3 | Washington | | Holtby | 18,506 | 46–12–4 | 96 | Recap |
| 63 | March 2 | Toronto | 2–3 | Washington | | Grubauer | 18,506 | 47–12–4 | 98 | Recap |
| 64 | March 4 | NY Rangers | 3–2 | Washington | | Holtby | 18,506 | 47–13–4 | 98 | Recap |
| 65 | March 5 | Washington | 2–1 | Boston | OT | Grubauer | 17,565 | 48–13–4 | 100 | Recap |
| 66 | March 7 | Washington | 2–1 | Anaheim | SO | Holtby | 17,174 | 49–13–4 | 102 | Recap |
| 67 | March 9 | Washington | 3–4 | Los Angeles | OT | Holtby | 18,324 | 49–13–5 | 103 | Recap |
| 68 | March 12 | Washington | 2–5 | San Jose | | Grubauer | 17,562 | 49–14–5 | 103 | Recap |
| 69 | March 15 | Carolina | 1–2 | Washington | OT | Holtby | 18,506 | 50–14–5 | 105 | Recap |
| 70 | March 18 | Nashville | 1–4 | Washington | | Holtby | 18,506 | 51–14–5 | 107 | Recap |
| 71 | March 20 | Washington | 2–6 | Pittsburgh | | Holtby | 18,656 | 51–15–5 | 107 | Recap |
| 72 | March 22 | Washington | 4–2 | Ottawa | | Holtby | 19,313 | 52–15–5 | 109 | Recap |
| 73 | March 25 | Washington | 1–0 | New Jersey | OT | Holtby | 16,514 | 53–15–5 | 111 | Recap |
| 74 | March 26 | St. Louis | 4–0 | Washington | | Grubauer | 18,506 | 53–16–5 | 111 | Recap |
| 75 | March 28 | Columbus | 1–4 | Washington | | Holtby | 18,506 | 54–16–5 | 113 | Recap |
| 76 | March 30 | Washington | 1–2 | Philadelphia | SO | Holtby | 19,850 | 54–16–6 | 114 | Recap |

April: 2–2–2 (Home: 0–1–2; Road: 2–1–0)
| # | Date | Visitor | Score | Home | OT | Decision | Attendance | Record | Pts | Recap |
|---|---|---|---|---|---|---|---|---|---|---|
| 77 | April 1 | Washington | 4–2 | Colorado | | Holtby | 18,049 | 55–16–6 | 116 | Recap |
| 78 | April 2 | Washington | 0–3 | Arizona | | Grubauer | 17,125 | 55–17–6 | 116 | Recap |
| 79 | April 5 | NY Islanders | 4–3 | Washington | OT | Holtby | 18,506 | 55–17–7 | 117 | Recap |
| 80 | April 7 | Pittsburgh | 4–3 | Washington | OT | Holtby | 18,506 | 55–17–8 | 118 | Recap |
| 81 | April 9 | Washington | 5–1 | St. Louis | | Holtby | 19,610 | 56–17–8 | 120 | Recap |
| 82 | April 10 | Anaheim | 2–0 | Washington | | Grubauer | 18,506 | 56–18–8 | 120 | Recap |

Legend: Win (2 points) Loss (0 points) Overtime/shootout loss (1 point)

=== Playoffs ===
2016 Stanley Cup playoffs

Eastern Conference First Round vs. (WC2) Philadelphia Flyers: Washington wins 4–2
| # | Date | Visitor | Score | Home | OT | Decision | Attendance | Series | Recap |
|---|---|---|---|---|---|---|---|---|---|
| 1 | April 14 | Philadelphia | 0–2 | Washington | | Holtby | 18,506 | 1–0 | Recap |
| 2 | April 16 | Philadelphia | 1–4 | Washington | | Holtby | 18,506 | 2–0 | Recap |
| 3 | April 18 | Washington | 6–1 | Philadelphia | | Holtby | 19,678 | 3–0 | Recap |
| 4 | April 20 | Washington | 1–2 | Philadelphia | | Holtby | 19,692 | 3–1 | Recap |
| 5 | April 22 | Philadelphia | 2–0 | Washington | | Holtby | 18,506 | 3–2 | Recap |
| 6 | April 24 | Washington | 1–0 | Philadelphia | | Holtby | 19,925 | 4–2 | Recap |

Eastern Conference Second Round vs. (M2) Pittsburgh Penguins: Pittsburgh wins 4–2
| # | Date | Visitor | Score | Home | OT | Decision | Attendance | Series | Recap |
|---|---|---|---|---|---|---|---|---|---|
| 1 | April 28 | Pittsburgh | 3–4 | Washington | OT | Holtby | 18,506 | 1–0 | Recap |
| 2 | April 30 | Pittsburgh | 2–1 | Washington | | Holtby | 18,506 | 1–1 | Recap |
| 3 | May 2 | Washington | 2–3 | Pittsburgh | | Holtby | 18,601 | 1–2 | Recap |
| 4 | May 4 | Washington | 2–3 | Pittsburgh | OT | Holtby | 18,614 | 1–3 | Recap |
| 5 | May 7 | Pittsburgh | 1–3 | Washington | | Holtby | 18,506 | 2–3 | Recap |
| 6 | May 10 | Washington | 3–4 | Pittsburgh | OT | Holtby | 18,650 | 2–4 | Recap |

Legend: Win Loss

== Player statistics ==
Final stats

Skaters

Regular season
| Player | GP | G | A | Pts | +/− | PIM |
|---|---|---|---|---|---|---|
| Evgeny Kuznetsov | 82 | 20 | 57 | 77 | 27 | 32 |
| Alexander Ovechkin | 79 | 50 | 21 | 71 | 21 | 53 |
| Nicklas Backstrom | 75 | 20 | 50 | 70 | 17 | 36 |
| Justin Williams | 82 | 22 | 30 | 52 | 15 | 36 |
| T. J. Oshie | 80 | 26 | 25 | 51 | 16 | 34 |
| Marcus Johansson | 74 | 17 | 29 | 46 | 12 | 16 |
| Jason Chimera | 82 | 20 | 20 | 40 | 0 | 22 |
| John Carlson | 56 | 8 | 31 | 39 | 16 | 14 |
| Andre Burakovsky | 79 | 17 | 21 | 38 | 4 | 12 |
| Matt Niskanen | 82 | 5 | 27 | 32 | 10 | 38 |
| Dmitry Orlov | 82 | 8 | 21 | 29 | 8 | 26 |
| Tom Wilson | 82 | 7 | 16 | 23 | 3 | 163 |
| Karl Alzner | 82 | 4 | 17 | 21 | 14 | 26 |
| Jay Beagle | 57 | 8 | 9 | 17 | 0 | 24 |
| Nate Schmidt | 72 | 2 | 14 | 16 | 12 | 16 |
| Brooks Orpik | 41 | 3 | 7 | 10 | 11 | 24 |
| Michael Latta | 43 | 3 | 4 | 7 | 0 | 50 |
| Brooks Laich^{‡} | 60 | 1 | 6 | 7 | −7 | 16 |
| Taylor Chorney | 55 | 1 | 5 | 6 | 8 | 21 |
| Mike Richards | 39 | 2 | 3 | 5 | −2 | 8 |
| Daniel Winnik^{†} | 20 | 2 | 3 | 5 | 7 | 22 |
| Stanislav Galiev | 24 | 0 | 3 | 3 | 2 | 4 |
| Aaron Ness | 8 | 0 | 2 | 2 | 4 | 2 |
| Paul Carey | 4 | 1 | 0 | 1 | 0 | 0 |
| Zach Sill | 10 | 1 | 0 | 1 | 0 | 2 |
| Mike Weber^{†} | 10 | 0 | 0 | 0 | −1 | 28 |
| Sean Collins | 2 | 0 | 0 | 0 | −1 | 2 |
| Ryan Stanton | 1 | 0 | 0 | 0 | −1 | 2 |
| Chandler Stephenson | 9 | 0 | 0 | 0 | −3 | 2 |
| Chris Brown^{‡} | 1 | 0 | 0 | 0 | 0 | 0 |
| Connor Carrick^{‡} | 3 | 0 | 0 | 0 | −2 | 0 |

Playoffs
| Player | GP | G | A | Pts | +/− | PIM |
|---|---|---|---|---|---|---|
| Alexander Ovechkin | 12 | 5 | 7 | 12 | 3 | 2 |
| John Carlson | 12 | 5 | 7 | 12 | −2 | 4 |
| Nicklas Backstrom | 12 | 2 | 9 | 11 | 3 | 8 |
| T. J. Oshie | 12 | 6 | 4 | 10 | 2 | 11 |
| Justin Williams | 12 | 3 | 4 | 7 | −3 | 14 |
| Marcus Johansson | 12 | 2 | 5 | 7 | −2 | 2 |
| Jay Beagle | 12 | 3 | 0 | 3 | 1 | 2 |
| Matt Niskanen | 12 | 0 | 3 | 3 | 3 | 6 |
| Jason Chimera | 12 | 1 | 1 | 2 | −1 | 12 |
| Evgeny Kuznetsov | 12 | 1 | 1 | 2 | −4 | 8 |
| Karl Alzner | 12 | 0 | 2 | 2 | 3 | 6 |
| Andre Burakovsky | 12 | 1 | 0 | 1 | −1 | 6 |
| Taylor Chorney | 7 | 0 | 1 | 1 | −1 | 4 |
| Dmitry Orlov | 11 | 0 | 1 | 1 | 0 | 2 |
| Tom Wilson | 12 | 0 | 1 | 1 | −3 | 13 |
| Nate Schmidt | 10 | 0 | 1 | 1 | −3 | 2 |
| Brooks Orpik | 6 | 0 | 0 | 0 | −3 | 10 |
| Mike Richards | 12 | 0 | 0 | 0 | 0 | 4 |
| Daniel Winnik | 12 | 0 | 0 | 0 | 0 | 4 |
| Mike Weber | 2 | 0 | 0 | 0 | −1 | 0 |

Goaltenders

Regular season
| Player | GP | GS | TOI | W | L | OT | GA | GAA | SA | SV% | SO | G | A | PIM |
|---|---|---|---|---|---|---|---|---|---|---|---|---|---|---|
| Braden Holtby | 66 | 66 | 3841:11 | 48 | 9 | 7 | 141 | 2.20 | 1802 | .922 | 3 | 0 | 1 | 6 |
| Philipp Grubauer | 22 | 16 | 1111:53 | 8 | 9 | 1 | 43 | 2.32 | 523 | .918 | 0 | 0 | 0 | 2 |

Playoffs
| Player | GP | GS | TOI | W | L | OT | GA | GAA | SA | SV% | SO | G | A | PIM |
|---|---|---|---|---|---|---|---|---|---|---|---|---|---|---|
| Braden Holtby | 12 | 12 | 732 | 6 | 6 | 2 | 21 | 1.72 | 363 | .942 | 2 | 0 | 1 | 0 |

^{†}Denotes player spent time with another team before joining the Capitals. Stats reflect time with the Capitals only.
^{‡}Denotes player was traded mid-season. Stats reflect time with the Capitals only.
Bold/italics denotes franchise record.

== Player suspensions/fines ==
| Player | Explanation | Length | Salary | Date issued |
|---|---|---|---|---|
| Zach Sill | Boarding on Boston Bruins defenseman Adam McQuaid during NHL Game No. 588 in Boston on Tuesday, January 5, 2016, at 4:43 of the second period. | 2 games | $6,182.80 | January 6, 2016 |
| Marcus Johansson | Illegal check to the head of New York Islanders defenseman Thomas Hickey during NHL Game No. 601 in New York on Thursday, January 7, 2016, at 8:42 of the first period. | 2 games | $40,322.58 | January 8, 2016 |

== Notable achievements ==
=== Awards ===
Regular season
| Player | Award | Awarded |
|---|---|---|
| E. Kuznetsov | NHL First Star of the Week | October 26, 2015 |
| B. Holtby | NHL Second Star of the Week | November 30, 2015 |
| B. Holtby | NHL Second Star of the Month | December 1, 2015 |
| T. Oshie | NHL Second Star of the Week | December 21, 2015 |
| A. Ovechkin | NHL All-Star game captain | January 2, 2016 |
| B. Holtby | NHL Second Star of the Month | January 4, 2016 |
| B. Holtby | NHL All-Star game selection | January 6, 2016 |
| N. Backstrom | NHL All-Star game selection | January 6, 2016 |
| A. Ovechkin | NHL First Star of the Week | January 11, 2016 |
| E. Kuznetsov | NHL All-Star game replacement selection | January 28, 2016 |
| E. Kuznetsov | NHL First Star of the Month | February 1, 2016 |

=== Milestones ===
Regular season
| Player | Milestone | Reached |
|---|---|---|
| M. Niskanen | 200th Career NHL Point | October 10, 2015 |
| J. Carlson | 400th Career NHL Game | October 13, 2015 |
| C. Stephenson | 1st Career NHL Game | October 15, 2015 |
| E. Kuznetsov | 100th Career NHL Game | October 15, 2015 |
| S. Galiev | 1st Career NHL Assist | October 15, 2015 |
| A. Ovechkin | 900th Career NHL Point | October 20, 2015 |
| J. Carlson | 200th Career NHL Point | November 5, 2015 |
| A. Ovechkin | 484th Career Goal; Most Goals scored by Russian | November 19, 2015 |
| B. Laich | 700th Career NHL Game | November 19, 2015 |
| B. Holtby | 200th Career NHL Game | December 8, 2015 |
| N. Backstrom | 600th Career NHL Game | December 8, 2015 |
| M. Johansson | 200th Career NHL Point | December 8, 2015 |
| J. Williams | 600th Career NHL Point | December 8, 2015 |
| M. Niskanen | 600th Career NHL Game | December 10, 2015 |
| J. Chimera | 900th Career NHL Game | December 18, 2015 |
| N. Backstrom | 600th Career NHL Point | December 18, 2015 |
| N. Schmidt | 100th Career NHL Game | December 31, 2015 |
| A. Ovechkin | 800th Career NHL Game | January 9, 2016 |
| T. Chorney | 100th Career NHL Game | January 9, 2016 |
| A. Ovechkin | 500th Career NHL Goal | January 10, 2016 |

== Transactions ==
The Capitals have been involved in the following transactions during the 2015–16 season.

=== Trades ===
| Date | Details | | Ref |
| June 27, 2015 | To New York Rangers BUF's 3rd-round pick in 2015; 4th-round pick in 2015 | To Washington Capitals MTL's 2nd-round pick in 2015 |
| July 2, 2015 | To St. Louis Blues Troy Brouwer; Pheonix Copley; 3rd-round pick in 2016 | To Washington Capitals T. J. Oshie |
| February 23, 2016 | To Buffalo Sabres 3rd-round pick in 2017 | To Washington Capitals Mike Weber^{[Note 1]} |
| February 28, 2016 | To New York Rangers Chris Brown | To Washington Capitals Ryan Bourque |
| February 28, 2016 | To Toronto Maple Leafs Brooks Laich; Connor Carrick; 2nd-round pick in 2016 | To Washington Capitals Daniel Winnik; ANA's 5th-round pick in 2016 |

Notes

- ^{Note 1} Buffalo to retain 50% ($1.67 million) of salary as part of trade.

=== Free agents acquired ===
| Date | Player | Former team | Contract terms (in U.S. dollars) | Ref |
| July 1, 2015 | Taylor Chorney | Pittsburgh Penguins | 1 year, $700,000 | |
| July 1, 2015 | Justin Williams | Los Angeles Kings | 2 years, $6.5 million | |
| July 1, 2015 | Aaron Ness | Bridgeport Sound Tigers | 1 year, $575,000 | |
| July 1, 2015 | Carter Camper | Binghamton Senators | 1 year, $575,000 | |
| July 1, 2015 | Sean Collins | Columbus Blue Jackets | 1 year, $575,000 | |
| July 2, 2015 | Chris Bourque | Hartford Wolf Pack | 2 years, $1.2 million | |
| July 4, 2015 | Dan Ellis | Florida Panthers | 1 year, $650,000 | |
| July 8, 2015 | Paul Carey | Providence Bruins | 1 year, $575,000 | |
| July 16, 2015 | Zach Sill | Toronto Maple Leafs | 1 year, $575,000 | |
| July 24, 2015 | Ryan Stanton | Vancouver Canucks | 1 year, $575,000 | |
| October 5, 2015 | Tim McGauley | Brandon Wheat Kings | 3 years, entry-level contract | |
| January 6, 2016 | Mike Richards | Los Angeles Kings | 1 year, $1 million | |
| March 28, 2016 | Adam Carlson | Mercyhurst College | 2 years, entry-level contract | |

=== Free agents lost ===
| Date | Player | New team | Contract terms (in U.S. dollars) | Ref |
| July 1, 2015 | Mike Green | Detroit Red Wings | 3 years, $18 million | |
| July 1, 2015 | Steve Oleksy | Pittsburgh Penguins | 1 years, $575,000 | |
| July 1, 2015 | Chris Conner | Philadelphia Flyers | 1 years, $575,000 | |
| July 2, 2015 | Cameron Schilling | Chicago Blackhawks | 1 years, $575,000 | |
| July 3, 2015 | Joel Ward | San Jose Sharks | 3 years, $9.825 million | |
| July 28, 2015 | Eric Fehr | Pittsburgh Penguins | 3 years, $6 million | |

=== Claimed via waivers ===
| Player | Previous team | Date | Ref |

=== Lost via waivers ===
| Player | New team | Date | Ref |

=== Lost via retirement ===
| Date | Player | Ref |
| June 29, 2015 | Patrick Wey | |

=== Player signings ===
| Date | Player | Contract terms (in U.S. dollars) | Ref |
| June 29, 2015 | Jay Beagle | 3-years, $5.25 million | |
| July 1, 2015 | Stanislav Galiev | 2-years, $2.3 million | |
| July 1, 2015 | Mike Moore | 1 year, $575,000 | |
| July 6, 2015 | Evgeny Kuznetsov | 2-years, $6 million | |
| July 6, 2015 | Chris Brown | 2-years, $1.701 million | |
| July 24, 2015 | Braden Holtby | 5-years, $30.5 million | |
| July 30, 2015 | Jonas Siegenthaler | 3-years, entry-level contract | |
| July 31, 2015 | Marcus Johansson | 1-year, $3.75 million | |
| February 19, 2016 | Taylor Chorney | 2-years, $1.6 million contract extension | |

== Draft picks ==
Below are the Washington Capitals' selections at the 2015 NHL entry draft, to be held on June 26–27, 2015 at the BB&T Center in Sunrise, Florida.

| Round | # | Player | Pos | Nationality | College/Junior/Club team (League) |
|---|---|---|---|---|---|
| 1 | 22 | Ilya Samsonov | G | Russia | Metallurg Magnitogorsk (KHL) |
| 2 | 57^{[a]} | Jonas Siegenthaler | D | Switzerland | ZSC Lions (NLA) |
| 5 | 143 | Conner Hobbs | D | Canada | Regina Pats (WHL) |
| 6 | 173 | Colby Williams | D | Canada | Regina Pats (WHL) |

Draft notes

- The Washington Capitals' second-round pick will go to the Calgary Flames as the result of a trade on March 1, 2015, that sent Curtis Glencross to Washington in exchange for a third-round pick in 2015 and this pick.
- ^{a} The Montreal Canadiens' second-round pick went to the Washington Capitals as the result of a trade on June 27, 2015, that sent Buffalo's third-round pick in 2015 (62nd overall) and a fourth-round pick in 2015 (113th overall) to New York in exchange for this pick. The Rangers previously acquired this pick as the result of a trade on June 27, 2015, that sent Cam Talbot and a seventh-round pick in 2015 (209th overall) to Edmonton in exchange for Ottawa's third-round pick in 2015 (79th overall), a seventh-round pick in 2015 (184th overall) and this pick.
- The Washington Capitals' third-round pick will go to the Calgary Flames as the result of a trade on March 1, 2015, that sent Curtis Glencross to Washington in exchange for a second-round pick in 2015 and this pick.
- The Washington Capitals' fourth-round pick went to the New York Rangers as the result of a trade on June 27, 2015, that sent Montreal's second-round pick in 2015 (57th overall) to Washington in exchange for and Buffalo's third-round pick in 2015 (62nd overall) and this pick.
- The Washington Capitals' seventh-round pick will go to the Winnipeg Jets as the result of a trade on June 28, 2014, that sent Edward Pasquale and a sixth-round pick in 2014 to Washington in exchange for a sixth-round pick in 2014, Nashville's seventh-round pick in 2014 and this pick.
