= 2015–16 New York Rangers season =

National Hockey League season

2015–16 New York Rangers
- Division: 3rd Metropolitan
- Conference: 4th Eastern
- 2015–16 record: 46–27–9
- Home record: 27–10–4
- Road record: 19–17–5
- Goals for: 236
- Goals against: 217

Team information
- General manager: Jeff Gorton
- Coach: Alain Vigneault
- Captain: Ryan McDonagh
- Alternate captains: Dan Girardi; Marc Staal; Derek Stepan
- Arena: Madison Square Garden
- Average attendance: 18,006
- Minor league affiliates: Hartford Wolf Pack (AHL); Greenville Swamp Rabbits (ECHL)

Team leaders
- Goals: Derick Brassard (27)
- Assists: Keith Yandle (42)
- Points: Mats Zuccarello (61)
- Penalty minutes: Tanner Glass (66)
- Plus/minus: Ryan McDonagh (+26)
- Wins: Henrik Lundqvist (35)
- Goals against average: Antti Raanta (2.24)

The 2015–16 New York Rangers season was the franchise's 89th season of play and their 90th season overall. The season began its regular games on October 7, 2015, against the Chicago Blackhawks.

== Regular season ==
- On November 15, the Rangers beat the Toronto Maple Leafs to extend their winning streak to nine: the second-longest in franchise history. Additionally, the win surpassed eight-game winning streaks that occurred in the 2014–15 season and the 1974–75 season.
- On January 16, Henrik Lundqvist recorded his 20th victory of the season, making him the first NHL goaltender to start his career with 11 straight, 20-win seasons. Lundqvist also joined Hockey Hall of Fame member Tony Esposito and retired goaltender Martin Brodeur as the only goalies with 11 consecutive, 20-win seasons at any point in their career. Overall, Lundqvist became the 15th NHL netminder to have won at least 20 games in a season 11 times.
- On February 14, Lundqvist became the Rangers' all-time leader in games played by a goaltender. He surpassed Mike Richter with his 667th career appearance in a 3–1 home win over the Philadelphia Flyers.

== Standings ==
Metropolitan Division
Pos	Team	GP	W	L	OTL	ROW	GF	GA	GD	Pts
1	p – Washington Capitals	82	56	18	8	52	252	193	+59	120
2	x – Pittsburgh Penguins	82	48	26	8	44	245	203	+42	104
3	x – New York Rangers	82	46	27	9	43	236	217	+19	101
4	x – New York Islanders	82	45	27	10	40	232	216	+16	100
5	x – Philadelphia Flyers	82	41	27	14	38	214	218	−4	96
6	Carolina Hurricanes	82	35	31	16	33	198	226	−28	86
7	New Jersey Devils	82	38	36	8	36	184	208	−24	84
8	Columbus Blue Jackets	82	34	40	8	28	219	252	−33	76

Source: National Hockey League
p – Clinched Presidents' Trophy; x – Clinched playoff spot

== Schedule and results ==
=== Pre-season ===
2015 pre-season: 4–1–1 (home: 3–0–0; road: 1–1–1)

Game	Date	Opponent	Score	Record
1	September 21	New Jersey Devils	6–3	1–0–0
2	September 22	@ Philadelphia Flyers	3–5	1–1–0
3	September 24	@ Boston Bruins	3–4 (SO)	1–1–1
4	September 26	@ New Jersey Devils	4–3	2–1–1
5	September 28	Philadelphia Flyers	3–2 (OT)	3–1–1
6	September 30	Boston Bruins	3–2	4–1–1

=== Regular season ===
2015–16 Game Log
October: 7–2–2, 16 Points (home: 5–1–1; road: 2–1–1)

Game	Date	Opponent	Score	OT	Decision	Location	Attendance	Record	Points	Recap
1	October 7	@ Chicago	3–2		Lundqvist	United Center	22,104	1–0–0	2	Recap
2	October 9	@ Columbus	4–2		Lundqvist	Nationwide Arena	19,027	2–0–0	4	Recap
3	October 10	Columbus	5–2		Lundqvist	Madison Square Garden	18,006	3–0–0	6	Recap
4	October 13	Winnipeg	1–4		Lundqvist	Madison Square Garden	18,006	3–1–0	6	Recap
5	October 15	@ Montreal	0–3		Lundqvist	Bell Centre	21,288	3–2–0	6	Recap
6	October 18	New Jersey	1–2	OT	Lundqvist	Madison Square Garden	18,006	3–2–1	7	Recap
7	October 19	San Jose	4–0		Raanta	Madison Square Garden	18,006	4–2–1	9	Recap
8	October 22	Arizona	4–1		Lundqvist	Madison Square Garden	18,006	5–2–1	11	Recap
9	October 24	@ Philadelphia	2–3	SO	Lundqvist	Wells Fargo Center	19,805	5–2–2	12	Recap
10	October 25	Calgary	4–1		Raanta	Madison Square Garden	18,006	6–2–2	14	Recap
11	October 30	Toronto	3–1		Lundqvist	Madison Square Garden	18,006	7–2–2	16	Recap

November: 10–4–0, 20 Points (home: 6–2–0; road: 4–2–0)

Game	Date	Opponent	Score	OT	Decision	Location	Attendance	Record	Points	Recap
12	November 3	Washington	5–2		Lundqvist	Madison Square Garden	18,006	8–2–2	18	Recap
13	November 6	@ Colorado	2–1		Lundqvist	Pepsi Center	17,818	9–2–2	20	Recap
14	November 7	@ Arizona	4–1		Raanta	Gila River Arena	13,029	10–2–2	22	Recap
15	November 10	Carolina	3–0		Lundqvist	Madison Square Garden	18,006	11–2–2	24	Recap
16	November 12	St. Louis	6–3		Lundqvist	Madison Square Garden	18,006	12–2–2	26	Recap
17	November 14	@ Ottawa	2–1	SO	Lundqvist	Canadian Tire Centre	20,006	13–2–2	28	Recap
18	November 15	Toronto	4–3		Raanta	Madison Square Garden	18,006	14–2–2	30	Recap
19	November 19	@ Tampa Bay	1–2		Lundqvist	Amalie Arena	19,092	14–3–2	30	Recap
20	November 21	@ Florida	5–4	OT	Lundqvist	BB&T Center	17,866	15–3–2	32	Recap
21	November 23	Nashville	3–0		Lundqvist	Madison Square Garden	18,006	16–3–2	34	Recap
22	November 25	Montreal	1–5		Lundqvist	Madison Square Garden	18,006	16–4–2	34	Recap
23	November 27	@ Boston	3–4		Lundqvist	TD Garden	17,565	16–5–2	34	Recap
24	November 28	Philadelphia	0–3		Raanta	Madison Square Garden	18,006	16–6–2	34	Recap
25	November 30	Carolina	4–3		Lundqvist	Madison Square Garden	18,006	17–6–2	36	Recap

December: 4–7–2, 10 Points (home: 3–2–0; road: 1–5–2)

Game	Date	Opponent	Score	OT	Decision	Location	Attendance	Record	Points	Recap
26	December 2	@ NY Islanders	1–2	SO	Lundqvist	Barclays Center	15,795	17–6–3	37	Recap
27	December 3	Colorado	1–2		Raanta	Madison Square Garden	18,006	17–7–3	37	Recap
28	December 6	Ottawa	4–1		Lundqvist	Madison Square Garden	18,006	18–7–3	39	Recap
29	December 9	@ Vancouver	1–2		Lundqvist	Rogers Arena	18,195	18–8–3	39	Recap
30	December 11	@ Edmonton	5–7		Raanta	Rexall Place	16,836	18–9–3	39	Recap
31	December 12	@ Calgary	4–5	OT	Raanta	Scotiabank Saddledome	19,289	18–9–4	40	Recap
32	December 15	Edmonton	4–2		Lundqvist	Madison Square Garden	18,006	19–9–4	42	Recap
33	December 17	@ Minnesota	2–5		Lundqvist	Xcel Energy Center	19,090	19–10–4	42	Recap
34	December 18	@ Winnipeg	2–5		Lundqvist	MTS Centre	15,294	19–11–4	42	Recap
35	December 20	Washington	3–7		Lundqvist	Madison Square Garden	18,006	19–12–4	42	Recap
36	December 22	Anaheim	3–2	OT	Lundqvist	Madison Square Garden	18,006	20–12–4	44	Recap
37	December 28	@ Nashville	3–5		Lundqvist	Bridgestone Arena	17,317	20–13–4	44	Recap
38	December 30	@ Tampa Bay	5–2		Lundqvist	Amalie Arena	19,092	21–13–4	46	Recap

January: 6–4–1, 13 Points (home: 4–0–1; road: 2–4–0)

Game	Date	Opponent	Score	OT	Decision	Location	Attendance	Record	Points	Recap
39	January 2	@ Florida	0–3		Lundqvist	BB&T Center	20,289	21–14–4	46	Recap
40	January 5	Dallas	6–2		Lundqvist	Madison Square Garden	18,006	22–14–4	48	Recap
41	January 9	Washington	3–4	OT	Lundqvist	Madison Square Garden	18,006	22–14–5	49	Recap
42	January 11	Boston	2–1		Lundqvist	Madison Square Garden	18,006	23–14–5	51	Recap
43	January 14	@ NY Islanders	1–3		Lundqvist	Barclays Center	15,795	23–15–5	51	Recap
44	January 16	@ Philadelphia	3–2	SO	Lundqvist	Wells Fargo Center	19,843	24–15–5	53	Recap
45	January 17	@ Washington	2–5		Raanta	Verizon Center	18,506	24–16–5	53	Recap
46	January 19	Vancouver	3–2	OT	Lundqvist	Madison Square Garden	18,006	25–16–5	55	Recap
47	January 22	@ Carolina	4–1		Lundqvist	PNC Arena	14,102	26–16–5	57	Recap
48	January 24	@ Ottawa	0–3		Lundqvist	Canadian Tire Centre	18,940	26–17–5	57	Recap
49	January 25	Buffalo	6–3		Lundqvist	Madison Square Garden	18,006	27–17–5	59	Recap

February: 10–3–1, 21 Points (home: 5–1–1; road: 5–2–0)

Game	Date	Opponent	Score	OT	Decision	Location	Attendance	Record	Points	Recap
50	February 2	@ New Jersey	2–3		Lundqvist	Prudential Center	16,514	27–18–5	59	Recap
51	February 4	Minnesota	4–2		Lundqvist	Madison Square Garden	18,006	28–18–5	61	Recap
52	February 6	@ Philadelphia	3–2	SO	Lundqvist	Wells Fargo Center	19,805	29–18–5	63	Recap
53	February 8	New Jersey	2–1		Lundqvist	Madison Square Garden	18,006	30–18–5	65	Recap
54	February 10	@ Pittsburgh	3–0		Lundqvist	Consol Energy Center	18,539	31–18–5	67	Recap
55	February 12	Los Angeles	4–5	OT	Raanta	Madison Square Garden	18,006	31–18–6	68	Recap
56	February 14	Philadelphia	3–1		Lundqvist	Madison Square Garden	18,006	32–18–6	70	Recap
57	February 17	Chicago	3–5		Lundqvist	Madison Square Garden	18,006	32–19–6	70	Recap
58	February 18	@ Toronto	4–2		Raanta	Air Canada Centre	18,952	33–19–6	72	Recap
59	February 21	Detroit	1–0	OT	Lundqvist	Madison Square Garden	18,006	34–19–6	74	Recap
60	February 23	@ New Jersey	2–5		Lundqvist	Prudential Center	16,514	34–20–6	74	Recap
61	February 25	@ St. Louis	2–1		Lundqvist	Scottrade Center	17,524	35–20–6	76	Recap
62	February 27	@ Dallas	3–2		Lundqvist	American Airlines Center	18,532	36–20–6	78	Recap
63	February 29	Columbus	2–1		Raanta	Madison Square Garden	18,006	37–20–6	80	Recap

March: 6–5–3, 15 Points (home: 3–2–1; road: 3–2–2)

Game	Date	Opponent	Score	OT	Decision	Location	Attendance	Record	Points	Recap
64	March 3	@ Pittsburgh	1–4		Lundqvist	Consol Energy Center	18,492	37–21–6	80	Recap
65	March 4	@ Washington	3–2		Raanta	Verizon Center	18,506	38–21–6	82	Recap
66	March 6	NY Islanders	4–6		Raanta	Madison Square Garden	18,006	38–22–6	82	Recap
67	March 8	@ Buffalo	4–2		Raanta	First Niagara Center	19,070	39–22–6	84	Recap
68	March 12	@ Detroit	2–3	OT	Lundqvist	Joe Louis Arena	20,027	39–22–7	85	Recap
69	March 13	Pittsburgh	3–5		Lundqvist	Madison Square Garden	18,006	39–23–7	85	Recap
70	March 16	@ Anaheim	2–1		Raanta	Honda Center	15,400	40–23–7	87	Recap
71	March 17	@ Los Angeles	3–4	OT	Lundqvist	Staples Center	18,230	40–23–8	88	Recap
72	March 19	@ San Jose	1–4		Lundqvist	SAP Center at San Jose	16,888	40–24–8	88	Recap
73	March 21	Florida	4–2		Lundqvist	Madison Square Garden	18,006	41–24–8	90	Recap
74	March 23	Boston	5–2		Lundqvist	Madison Square Garden	18,006	42–24–8	92	Recap
75	March 26	@ Montreal	5–2		Raanta	Bell Centre	18,604	43–24–8	94	Recap
76	March 27	Pittsburgh	2–3	OT	Lundqvist	Madison Square Garden	18,006	43–24–9	95	Recap
77	March 31	@ Carolina	3–4		Lundqvist	PNC Arena	16,336	43–25–9	95	Recap

April: 3–2–0, 6 Points (home: 2–2–0; road: 1–0–0)

Game	Date	Opponent	Score	OT	Decision	Location	Attendance	Record	Points	Recap
78	April 2	Buffalo	3–4		Raanta	Madison Square Garden	18,006	43–26–9	95	Recap
79	April 4	@ Columbus	4–2		Lundqvist	Nationwide Arena	15,951	44–26–9	97	Recap
80	April 5	Tampa Bay	3–2		Lundqvist	Madison Square Garden	18,006	45–26–9	99	Recap
81	April 7	NY Islanders	1–4		Lundqvist	Madison Square Garden	18,006	45–27–9	99	Recap
82	April 9	Detroit	3–2		Raanta	Madison Square Garden	18,006	46–27–9	101	Recap

Win (2 Points) Loss (0 points) Overtime/shootout loss (1 point)

=== Playoffs ===
The Rangers qualified for the playoffs for the sixth consecutive season, entering as the fourth seed in the Eastern Conference and being matched up against the Pittsburgh Penguins.

2016 Stanley Cup playoffs
Eastern Conference First Round vs. (M2) Pittsburgh Penguins – Penguins won series 4–1 (home: 0–2; Away: 1–2)

Game	Date	Opponent	Score	Decision	Series
1	April 13	@ Pittsburgh Penguins	2–5	Raanta (0–1)	Penguins lead 1–0
2	April 16	@ Pittsburgh Penguins	4–2	Lundqvist (1–0)	Series tied 1–1
3	April 19	Pittsburgh Penguins	1–3	Lundqvist (1–1)	Penguins lead 2–1
4	April 21	Pittsburgh Penguins	0–5	Lundqvist (1–2)	Penguins lead 3–1
5	April 23	@ Pittsburgh Penguins	3–6	Lundqvist (1–3)	Penguins win series 4–1

Win Loss

== Player statistics ==
Final stats

Skaters

Regular season
Player	GP	G	A	Pts	+/−	PIM
Mats Zuccarello	81	26	35	61	2	34
Derick Brassard	80	27	31	58	12	30
Derek Stepan	72	22	31	53	5	20
Keith Yandle	82	5	42	47	−4	40
J. T. Miller	82	22	21	43	10	46
Chris Kreider	79	21	22	43	10	58
Rick Nash	60	15	21	36	8	30
Kevin Hayes	79	14	22	36	4	30
Ryan McDonagh	73	9	25	34	26	22
Jesper Fast	79	10	20	30	9	18
Oscar Lindberg	68	13	15	28	12	43
Kevin Klein	69	9	17	26	16	19
Dan Boyle	74	10	14	24	0	30
Viktor Stalberg	75	9	11	20	6	22
Dan Girardi	74	2	15	17	18	20
Dominic Moore	80	6	9	15	−2	32
Marc Staal	77	2	13	15	2	36
Tanner Glass	57	4	3	7	−3	66
Eric Staal^{†}	20	3	3	6	1	2
Dylan McIlrath	34	2	2	4	7	64
Jarret Stoll^{‡}	29	1	2	3	3	20
Emerson Etem^{‡}	19	0	3	3	−4	2
Jayson Megna	6	1	1	2	−1	2
Marek Hrivik	5	0	1	1	3	0
Daniel Paille	12	0	0	0	−2	0
Chris Summers	3	0	0	0	−2	4
Brady Skjei	7	0	0	0	1	4

Playoffs
Player	GP	G	A	Pts	+/−	PIM
Rick Nash	5	2	2	4	0	4
Derick Brassard	5	1	3	4	−1	0
J. T. Miller	5	0	3	3	−3	4
Derek Stepan	5	2	0	2	0	0
Chris Kreider	5	2	0	2	1	6
Mats Zuccarello	5	1	1	2	−2	4
Marc Staal	5	0	2	2	−1	4
Brady Skjei	5	0	2	2	1	2
Keith Yandle	5	1	0	1	−4	2
Dominic Moore	5	1	0	1	0	6
Dan Boyle	4	0	1	1	0	0
Kevin Klein	5	0	1	1	−3	7
Dan Girardi	2	0	1	1	−2	0
Jesper Fast	5	0	1	1	−2	0
Raphael Diaz	1	0	1	1	−1	0
Eric Staal	5	0	0	0	−7	4
Tanner Glass	4	0	0	0	0	4
Viktor Stalberg	5	0	0	0	−2	6
Ryan McDonagh	3	0	0	0	−1	0
Oscar Lindberg	2	0	0	0	−1	2
Kevin Hayes	3	0	0	0	−1	4
Dylan McIlrath	1	0	0	0	1	0

Goaltenders

Regular season
Player	GP	GS	TOI	W	L	OT	GA	GAA	SA	SV%	SO	G	A	PIM
Henrik Lundqvist	65	64	3,772	35	21	7	156	2.48	1944	.920	4	0	4	4
Antti Raanta	25	18	1,150	11	6	2	43	2.24	530	.919	1	0	0	0
Magnus Hellberg	1	0	20	0	0	0	2	6.00	6	.667	0	0	0	0

Playoffs
Player	GP	GS	TOI	W	L	GA	GAA	SA	SV%	SO	G	A	PIM
Henrik Lundqvist	5	5	205	1	3	15	4.39	113	.867	0	0	0	0
Antti Raanta	3	0	94	0	1	4	2.55	38	.895	0	0	0	0

^{†}Denotes player spent time with another team before joining the Rangers. Stats reflect time with the Rangers only.
^{‡}Denotes player was traded mid-season. Stats reflect time with the Rangers only.
Bold/italics denotes franchise record.

== Awards and honors ==
=== Awards ===
Regular season
Player	Award	Date
Oscar Lindberg	NHL Second Star of the Week	October 12, 2015
Mats Zuccarello	NHL Second Star of the Week	November 16, 2015
Ryan McDonagh	NHL All-Star game selection	January 6, 2016
Henrik Lundqvist	NHL Second Star of the Week	February 15, 2016
Mats Zuccarello	Steven McDonald Extra Effort Award	April 7, 2016

=== Milestones ===
Regular season
Player	Milestone	Reached
Oscar Lindberg	1st career NHL goal 1st career NHL point	October 7, 2015
Kevin Klein	500th career NHL game	October 9, 2015
Alain Vigneault	100th Win as Rangers Head Coach	October 9, 2015
Oscar Lindberg	1st career NHL assist	October 18, 2015
Marc Staal	100th career NHL assist	October 19, 2015
Rick Nash	700th career NHL point	October 22, 2015
Jarret Stoll	800th career NHL game	October 24, 2015
Dan Girardi	200th career NHL point	October 25, 2015
Mats Zuccarello	1st career NHL hat-trick	October 30, 2015
Mats Zuccarello	100th career NHL assist	November 3, 2015
Derick Brassard	500th career NHL game	November 14, 2015
Dominic Moore	700th career NHL game	November 14, 2015
Keith Yandle	600th career NHL game	November 23, 2015
Kevin Hayes	100th career NHL game	November 23, 2015
Derick Brassard	300th career NHL point	November 25, 2015
Alain Vigneault	1,000th career NHL game as Head Coach	December 11, 2015
Dylan McIlrath	1st career NHL assist 1st career NHL point	December 11, 2015
Chris Kreider	100th career NHL point	December 11, 2015
Chris Kreider	200th career NHL game	December 12, 2015
Brady Skjei	1st career NHL game	December 15, 2015
Dylan McIlrath	1st career NHL goal	December 15, 2015
Jesper Fast	100th career NHL game	December 17, 2015
Derick Brassard	200th career NHL assist	December 22, 2015
Rick Nash	900th career NHL game	January 5, 2016
Henrik Lundqvist	20th career NHL win in 11 straight seasons	January 16, 2016
Derek Stepan	400th career NHL game	January 24, 2016
Dan Girardi	700th career NHL game	February 12, 2016
Derek Stepan	100th career NHL goal	February 14, 2016
Marek Hrivik	1st career NHL game	February 21, 2016
Marek Hrivik	1st career NHL assist 1st career NHL point	February 23, 2016
Henrik Lundqvist	30th career NHL win in 11 straight seasons (only goalie in NHL history with 30 wins in 10 of 11 seasons)	February 25, 2016
Marc Staal	600th career NHL game	February 27, 2016
Dan Boyle	600th career NHL point	March 6, 2016
Viktor Stalberg	400th career NHL game	March 12, 2016
Kevin Klein	100th career NHL assist	March 21, 2016
Mats Zuccarello	200th career NHL point	March 31, 2016
Mats Zuccarello	300th career NHL game	April 2, 2016
Derek Stepan	300th career NHL point	April 4, 2016

Playoffs
Player	Milestone	Reached
Antti Raanta	1st career NHL playoff game	April 13, 2016
Brady Skjei	1st career NHL playoff game	April 13, 2016
Dylan McIlrath	1st career NHL playoff game	April 16, 2016
Brady Skjei	1st career NHL playoff assist 1st career NHL playoff point	April 16, 2016
Oscar Lindberg	1st career NHL playoff game	April 21, 2016
Raphael Diaz	1st career NHL playoff assist 1st career NHL playoff point	April 23, 2016

=== Records ===
Regular season
Player	Record	Reached
Henrik Lundqvist	743rd career NHL game (Franchise record)	November 10, 2015
Henrik Lundqvist	19,405th career NHL save (Franchise record)	November 10, 2015

== Transactions ==
The Rangers were involved in the following transactions during the 2015–16 season:

=== Trades ===
Date	Details		Ref
June 27, 2015	To Anaheim Ducks: Carl Hagelin; 2nd-round pick in 2015; 6th-round pick in 2015	To New York Rangers: Emerson Etem; FLA's 2nd-round pick in 2015
June 27, 2015	To Edmonton Oilers: Cam Talbot; 7th-round pick in 2015	To New York Rangers: MTL's 2nd-round pick in 2015; OTT's 3rd-round pick in 2015; 7th-round pick in 2015
June 27, 2015	To Washington Capitals: MTL's 2nd-round pick in 2015	To New York Rangers: BUF's 3rd-round pick in 2015; 4th-round pick in 2015
June 27, 2015	To Chicago Blackhawks: Ryan Haggerty	To New York Rangers: Antti Raanta
July 1, 2015	To Nashville Predators: 6th-round pick in 2017	To New York Rangers: Magnus Hellberg
January 8, 2016	To Vancouver Canucks: Emerson Etem	To New York Rangers: Nicklas Jensen; 6th-round pick in 2017
February 28, 2016	To Carolina Hurricanes: Aleksi Saarela; 2nd-round pick in 2016; 2nd-round pick in 2017	To New York Rangers: Eric Staal^{[Note 1]}
February 28, 2016	To Washington Capitals: Ryan Bourque	To New York Rangers: Chris Brown
June 20, 2016	To Florida Panthers: Keith Yandle (negotiating rights)	To New York Rangers: 6th-round pick in 2016; Conditional 4th-round pick in 2017^{[Note 2]}

Notes

- ^{Note 1} Carolina to retain 50% ($4.125 million) of salary as part of trade.
- ^{Note 2} Conditional on Yandle signing with the Panthers.

=== Free agents acquired ===
Date	Player	Former team	Contract terms (in U.S. dollars)	Ref
July 1, 2015	Raphael Diaz	Calgary Flames	1 year, $700,000	
July 1, 2015	Jayson Megna	Pittsburgh Penguins	1 year, $600,000	
July 1, 2015	Matt Lindblad	Providence Bruins	1 year, $600,000	
July 1, 2015	Viktor Stalberg	Nashville Predators	1 year, $1.1 million	
July 1, 2015	Brian Gibbons	Columbus Blue Jackets	1 year, $600,000	
July 3, 2015	Luke Adam	Columbus Blue Jackets	1 year, $600,000	
August 10, 2015	Jarret Stoll	Los Angeles Kings	1 year, $800,000	
January 21, 2016	Daniel Paille	Boston Bruins	1 year, $575,000	
April 1, 2016	Adam Chapie	University of Massachusetts Lowell	entry-level contract	
April 17, 2016	Malte Stromwall	AIK IF	entry-level contract	

=== Free agents lost ===
Date	Player	New team	Contract terms (in U.S. dollars)	Ref
July 1, 2015	Chris Mueller	Anaheim Ducks	1 year, $600,000	
July 1, 2015	Michael Kostka	Ottawa Senators	1 year, $800,000	
July 1, 2015	Matt Hunwick	Toronto Maple Leafs	2 years, $2.4 million	
July 2, 2015	Chris Bourque	Washington Capitals	2 years, $1.2 million	
July 2, 2015	Conor Allen	Nashville Predators	1 year, $575,000	
July 2, 2015	Danny Kristo	St. Louis Blues	1 year, $600,000	

=== Claimed via waivers ===
Player	Previous team	Date	Ref

=== Lost via waivers ===
Player	New team	Date	Ref
Jarret Stoll	Minnesota Wild	December 15, 2015	

=== Lost via retirement ===
Player	Ref
Martin St. Louis	

=== Player signings ===
Date	Player	Contract terms (in U.S. dollars)	Ref
July 10, 2015	Magnus Hellberg	2 years, $1.25 million	
July 10, 2015	Marek Hrivik	1 year, $698,250	
July 14, 2015	Oscar Lindberg	2 years, $1.3 million	
July 15, 2015	Emerson Etem	1 year, $850,500	
July 15, 2015	Dylan McIlrath	1 year, $600,000	
July 15, 2015	Jesper Fast	2 years, $1.9 million	
July 15, 2015	J. T. Miller	1 year, $874,000	
July 17, 2015	Mathew Bodie	1 year, $575,000	
July 27, 2015	Derek Stepan	6 years, $39 million	
December 31, 2015	Ryan Gropp	entry-level contract	
March 28, 2016	Boo Nieves	entry-level contract	
March 29, 2016	Steven Fogarty	entry-level contract	
May 2, 2016	Antti Raanta	2 years, $2 million	
May 13, 2016	Pavel Buchnevich	entry-level contract	
June 15, 2016	Chris Summers	1 year, $600,000	

== Draft picks ==
Below are the New York Rangers' selections at the 2015 NHL entry draft, held on June 26–27, 2015 at the BB&T Center in Sunrise, Florida.

Round	#	Player	Pos	Nationality	College/Junior/Club team (League)
2	41^{[a]}	Ryan Gropp	LW	Canada	Seattle Thunderbirds (WHL)
3	62^{[b]}	Robin Kovacs	RW	Sweden	AIK IF (HockeyAllsvenskan)
3	79^{[c]}	Sergey Zborovskiy	D	Russia	Regina Pats (WHL)
3	89	Aleksi Saarela	C	Finland	Assat (Liiga)
4	113^{[d]}	Brad Morrison	C	Canada	Prince George Cougars (WHL)
4	119	Daniel Bernhardt	RW	Sweden	Djurgardens IF J20 (J20 SuperElit)
7	184^{[e]}	Adam Huska	G	Slovakia	Green Bay Gamblers (USHL)

Draft notes

- The New York Rangers' first-round pick went to the New York Islanders as the result of a trade on June 26, 2015, that sent Edmonton's second-round pick in 2015 (33rd overall) and Florida's third-round pick in 2015 (72nd overall) to Tampa Bay in exchange for this pick. Tampa Bay previously acquired this pick as the result of trade on March 5, 2014, that sent Martin St. Louis and a conditional second-round pick in 2015 to New York in exchange for Ryan Callahan, a conditional first-round pick in 2014, a conditional seventh-round pick in 2015 and this pick.
- ^{[a]} The Florida Panthers' second-round pick went to the New York Rangers as the result of a trade on June 27, 2015, that sent Carl Hagelin and a second and sixth-round pick in 2015 (59th and 179th overall) to Anaheim in exchange for Emerson Etem and this pick. Anaheim previously acquired this pick as the result of a trade on June 26, 2015, that sent Kyle Palmieri to New Jersey in exchange for a third-round pick in 2016 and this pick. New Jersey previously acquired this pick as the result of a trade on February 26, 2015, that sent Jaromir Jagr to Florida in exchange for a conditional third-round pick in 2016 and this pick.
- The New York Rangers' second-round pick went to the Anaheim Ducks as the result of a trade on June 27, 2015, that sent Emerson Etem and Florida's second-round pick in 2015 (41st overall) to New York in exchange for Carl Hagelin, a sixth-round pick in 2015 (179th overall) and this pick.
- ^{[b]} The Buffalo Sabres' third-round pick went to the New York Rangers as the result of a trade on June 27, 2015, that sent Montreal's second-round pick in 2015 (57th overall) to Washington in exchange for and a fourth-round pick in 2015 (113th overall) and this pick. Washington previously acquired this pick as the result of a trade on March 5, 2014, that sent Michal Neuvirth and Rostislav Klesla to Buffalo in exchange for Jaroslav Halak and this pick.
- ^{[c]} The Ottawa Senators' third-round pick went to the New York Rangers as the result of a trade on June 27, 2015, that sent Cam Talbot and a seventh-round pick in 2015 (209th overall) to Edmonton in exchange for Montreal's second-round pick in 2015 (57th overall), a seventh-round pick in 2015 (184th overall) and this pick. Edmonton previously acquired this pick as the result of a trade on March 5, 2014, that sent Ales Hemsky to Ottawa in exchange for a fifth-round pick in 2014 and this pick.
- ^{[d]} The Washington Capitals' fourth-round pick went to the New York Rangers as the result of a trade on June 27, 2015, that sent Montreal's second-round pick in 2015 (57th overall) to Washington in exchange for and Buffalo's third-round pick in 2015 (62nd overall) and this pick.
- The New York Rangers' fifth-round pick went to the Vancouver Canucks as the result of a trade on March 5, 2014, that sent Raphael Diaz to New York in exchange for this pick.
- The New York Rangers' sixth-round pick went to the Anaheim Ducks as the result of a trade on June 27, 2015, that sent Emerson Etem and Florida's second-round pick in 2015 (41st overall) to New York in exchange for Carl Hagelin, a second-round pick in 2015 (59th overall) and this pick.
- ^{[e]} The Edmonton Oilers' seventh-round pick went to the New York Rangers as the result of a trade on June 27, 2015, that sent Cam Talbot and a seventh-round pick in 2015 (209th overall) to Edmonton in exchange for Montreal's second-round pick in 2015 (57th overall), the Ottawa Senators' third-round pick (79th overall) and this pick.
