= 2015–16 Colorado Avalanche season =

National Hockey League team season

2015–16 Colorado Avalanche
- Division: 6th Central
- Conference: 9th Western
- 2015–16 record: 39–39–4
- Home record: 17–20–4
- Road record: 22–19–0
- Goals for: 216
- Goals against: 240

Team information
- General manager: Joe Sakic
- Coach: Patrick Roy
- Captain: Gabriel Landeskog
- Alternate captains: Jarome Iginla; Cody McLeod
- Arena: Pepsi Center
- Average attendance: 17,032
- Minor league affiliates: San Antonio Rampage (AHL); Fort Wayne Komets (ECHL)

Team leaders
- Goals: Matt Duchene (30)
- Assists: Carl Soderberg (39)
- Points: Matt Duchene (59)
- Penalty minutes: Cody McLeod (138)
- Plus/minus: Zach Redmond (+5)
- Wins: Semyon Varlamov (27)
- Goals against average: Reto Berra (2.41)

The 2015–16 Colorado Avalanche season was the 21st operational season and 20th playing season since the franchise relocated from Quebec prior to the start of the 1995–96 NHL season. As well as the franchise's 37th season in the National Hockey League and 44th season overall. The Avalanche celebrated their 20th anniversary this season.

The Avalanche were unable to make the playoffs for the second consecutive year.

== Standings ==
Central Division
Pos	Team	GP	W	L	OTL	ROW	GF	GA	GD	Pts
1	z – Dallas Stars	82	50	23	9	48	267	230	+37	109
2	x – St. Louis Blues	82	49	24	9	44	224	201	+23	107
3	x – Chicago Blackhawks	82	47	26	9	46	235	209	+26	103
4	x – Nashville Predators	82	41	27	14	37	228	215	+13	96
5	x – Minnesota Wild	82	38	33	11	35	216	206	+10	87
6	Colorado Avalanche	82	39	39	4	35	216	240	−24	82
7	Winnipeg Jets	82	35	39	8	32	215	239	−24	78

Source: National Hockey League
x – Clinched playoff spot; z – Clinched conference

Western Conference Wild Card
Pos	Div	Team	GP	W	L	OTL	ROW	GF	GA	GD	Pts
1	CE	x – Nashville Predators	82	41	27	14	37	228	215	+13	96
2	CE	x – Minnesota Wild	82	38	33	11	35	216	206	+10	87
3	CE	Colorado Avalanche	82	39	39	4	35	216	240	−24	82
4	PA	Arizona Coyotes	82	35	39	8	34	209	245	−36	78
5	CE	Winnipeg Jets	82	35	39	8	32	215	239	−24	78
6	PA	Calgary Flames	82	35	40	7	33	231	260	−29	77
7	PA	Vancouver Canucks	82	31	38	13	26	191	243	−52	75
8	PA	Edmonton Oilers	82	31	43	8	27	203	245	−42	70

Source: National Hockey League
x – Clinched playoff spot

== Schedule and results ==
=== Pre-season ===
Preseason game log: 1–4–1 (Home: 1–1–1; Road: 0–3–0)
#	Date	Visitor	Score	Home	OT	Decision	Attendance	Record	Recap
1	September 22	Anaheim	4–5	Colorado	OT	Will	––	1–0–0	Recap
2	September 24	Calgary	1–0	Colorado		Berra	––	1–1–0	Recap
3	September 27	Los Angeles	2–1	Colorado	SO	Varlamov	––	1–1–1	Recap
4	September 29	Colorado	0–2	Calgary		Pickard	18,806	1–2–1	Recap
5	October 1	Colorado	0–3	Anaheim		Varlamov	13,756	1–3–1	Recap
6^{[a]}	October 3	Colorado	0–4	Los Angeles		Berra	––	1–4–1	Recap
Notes:^{a} Game will be played at MGM Grand Garden Arena in Paradise, Nevada.

=== Regular season ===
Game log

October: 3–6–1 (Home: 1–3–1; Road: 2–3–0)
#	Date	Visitor	Score	Home	OT	Decision	Attendance	Record	Pts	Recap
1	October 8	Minnesota	5–4	Colorado		Varlamov	18,007	0–1–0	0	Recap
2	October 10	Dallas	3–6	Colorado		Varlamov	16,024	1–1–0	2	Recap
3	October 14	Boston	6–2	Colorado		Varlamov	15,082	1–2–0	2	Recap
4	October 16	Colorado	3–0	Anaheim		Berra	17,174	2–2–0	4	Recap
5	October 18	Colorado	1–2	Los Angeles		Berra	18,230	2–3–0	4	Recap
6	October 21	Carolina	1–0	Colorado	OT	Varlamov	12,826	2–3–1	5	Recap
7	October 24	Columbus	4–3	Colorado		Varlamov	18,007	2–4–1	5	Recap
8	October 27	Colorado	1–4	Florida		Berra	11,694	2–5–1	5	Recap
9	October 29	Colorado	2–1	Tampa Bay		Varlamov	19,092	3–5–1	7	Recap
10	October 30	Colorado	2–3	Carolina		Varlamov	9,345	3–6–1	7	Recap

November: 6–8–0 (Home: 2–3–0; Road: 4–5–0)
#	Date	Visitor	Score	Home	OT	Decision	Attendance	Record	Pts	Recap
11	November 1	San Jose	4–3	Colorado		Varlamov	17,128	3–7–1	7	Recap
12	November 3	Calgary	3–6	Colorado		Varlamov	14,408	4–7–1	9	Recap
13	November 5	Colorado	2–4	Arizona		Varlamov	10,270	4–8–1	9	Recap
14	November 6	NY Rangers	2–1	Colorado		Berra	17,818	4–9–1	9	Recap
15	November 10	Colorado	4–0	Philadelphia		Berra	18,587	5–9–1	11	Recap
16	November 12	Colorado	3–2	Boston		Berra	17,565	6–9–1	13	Recap
17	November 14	Colorado	6–1	Montreal		Berra	21,288	7–9–1	15	Recap
18	November 17	Colorado	1–5	Toronto		Berra	19,238	7–10–1	15	Recap
19	November 19	Colorado	3–4	Pittsburgh		Berra	18,430	7–11–1	15	Recap
20	November 21	Colorado	3–7	Washington		Berra	18,506	7–12–1	15	Recap
21	November 23	Colorado	4–1	Winnipeg		Varlamov	15,294	8–12–1	17	Recap
22	November 25	Ottawa	5–3	Colorado		Berra	16,570	8–13–1	17	Recap
23	November 28	Winnipeg	3–5	Colorado		Varlamov	16,311	9–13–1	19	Recap
24	November 30	Colorado	3–5	NY Islanders		Varlamov	11,585	9–14–1	19	Recap

December: 9–3–2 (Home: 3–2–2; Road: 6–1–0)
#	Date	Visitor	Score	Home	OT	Decision	Attendance	Record	Pts	Recap
25	December 1	Colorado	2–1	New Jersey		Berra	14,019	10–14–1	21	Recap
26	December 3	Colorado	2–1	NY Rangers		Varlamov	18,006	11–14–1	23	Recap
27	December 5	Colorado	0–3	Minnesota		Varlamov	19,173	11–15–1	23	Recap
28	December 7	Minnesota	1–2	Colorado	OT	Varlamov	16,589	12–15–1	25	Recap
29	December 9	Pittsburgh	4–2	Colorado		Berra	15,838	12–16–1	25	Recap
30	December 12	Colorado	3–2	Nashville		Varlamov	17,113	13–16–1	27	Recap
31	December 13	Colorado	3–1	St. Louis		Varlamov	17,961	14–16–1	29	Recap
32	December 15	Colorado	3–0	Chicago		Varlamov	21,473	15–16–1	31	Recap
33	December 17	NY Islanders	1–2	Colorado		Varlamov	15,811	16–16–1	33	Recap
34	December 19	Edmonton	1–5	Colorado		Varlamov	17,570	17–16–1	35	Recap
35	December 21	Toronto	7–4	Colorado		Varlamov	16,084	17–17–1	35	Recap
36	December 27	Arizona	2–1	Colorado	OT	Varlamov	18,064	17–17–2	36	Recap
37	December 28	Colorado	6–3	San Jose		Pickard	17,562	18–17–2	38	Recap
38	December 31	Chicago	4–3	Colorado	OT	Varlamov	18,048	18–17–3	39	Recap

January: 9–5–0 (Home: 6–2–0; Road: 3–3–0)
#	Date	Visitor	Score	Home	OT	Decision	Attendance	Record	Pts	Recap
39	January 2	Calgary	4–0	Colorado		Varlamov	18,087	18–18–3	39	Recap
40	January 4	Los Angeles	1–4	Colorado		Varlamov	15,202	19–18–3	41	Recap
41	January 6	St. Louis	3–4	Colorado	OT	Varlamov	13,359	20–18–3	43	Recap
42	January 8	Nashville	3–5	Colorado		Varlamov	17,680	21–18–3	45	Recap
43	January 10	Colorado	3–6	Chicago		Varlamov	22,007	21–19–3	45	Recap
44	January 12	Tampa Bay	4–0	Colorado		Varlamov	14,227	21–20–3	45	Recap
45	January 14	New Jersey	0–3	Colorado		Pickard	15,636	22–20–3	47	Recap
46	January 16	Colorado	1–2	Columbus		Pickard	17,776	22–21–3	47	Recap
47	January 18	Colorado	2–1	Winnipeg		Varlamov	15,294	23–21–3	49	Recap
48	January 20	Buffalo	1–2	Colorado		Varlamov	13,274	24–21–3	51	Recap
49	January 22	St. Louis	1–2	Colorado	SO	Varlamov	16,366	25–21–3	53	Recap
50	January 23	Colorado	3–1	Dallas		Varlamov	18,532	26–21–3	55	Recap
51	January 26	Colorado	1–6	San Jose		Pickard	17,424	26–22–3	55	Recap
52	January 27	Colorado	4–3	Los Angeles		Pickard	18,230	27–22–3	57	Recap

February: 5–6–1 (Home: 2–4–1; Road: 3–2–0)
#	Date	Visitor	Score	Home	OT	Decision	Attendance	Record	Pts	Recap
53	February 2	Chicago	2–1	Colorado		Pickard	18,007	27–23–3	57	Recap
54	February 4	Dallas	4–3	Colorado	OT	Pickard	14,351	27–23–4	58	Recap
55	February 6	Winnipeg	4–2	Colorado		Varlamov	14,983	27–24–4	58	Recap
56	February 9	Vancouver	3–1	Colorado		Varlamov	14,436	27–25–4	58	Recap
57	February 11	Colorado	4–3	Ottawa		Varlamov	17,632	28–25–4	60	Recap
58	February 12	Colorado	3–2	Detroit	SO	Varlamov	20,027	29–25–4	62	Recap
59	February 14	Colorado	1–4	Buffalo		Varlamov	19,070	29–26–4	62	Recap
60	February 17	Montreal	2–3	Colorado		Varlamov	16,271	30–26–4	64	Recap
61	February 20	Colorado	3–2	Edmonton		Pickard	16,939	31–26–4	66	Recap
62	February 21	Colorado	1–5	Vancouver		Varlamov	18,431	31–27–4	66	Recap
63	February 24	San Jose	3–4	Colorado	SO	Pickard	15,564	32–27–4	68	Recap
64	February 27 (outdoor game)	Detroit	5–3	Colorado		Varlamov	50,095 (at Coors Field)	32–28–4	68	Recap

March: 7–6–0 (Home: 3–3–0; Road: 4–3–0)
#	Date	Visitor	Score	Home	OT	Decision	Attendance	Record	Pts	Recap
65	March 1	Colorado	3–6	Minnesota		Pickard	19,107	32–29–4	68	Recap
66	March 3	Florida	2–3	Colorado		Pickard	16,194	33–29–4	70	Recap
67	March 5	Nashville	5–2	Colorado		Pickard	17,165	33–30–4	70	Recap
68	March 7	Arizona	1–3	Colorado		Varlamov	15,393	34–30–4	72	Recap
69	March 9	Anaheim	0–3	Colorado		Varlamov	14,292	35–30–4	74	Recap
70	March 12	Colorado	2–3	Winnipeg		Varlamov	15,294	35–31–4	74	Recap
71	March 16	Colorado	3–1	Vancouver		Varlamov	18,426	36–31–4	76	Recap
72	March 18	Colorado	4–3	Calgary	SO	Varlamov	19,289	37–31–4	78	Recap
73	March 20	Colorado	3–2	Edmonton		Pickard	16,839	38–31–4	80	Recap
74	March 24	Philadelphia	4–2	Colorado		Varlamov	18,087	38–32–4	80	Recap
75	March 26	Minnesota	4–0	Colorado		Varlamov	18,007	38–33–4	80	Recap
76	March 28	Colorado	4–3	Nashville		Varlamov	16,443	39–33–4	82	Recap
77	March 29	Colorado	1–3	St. Louis		Varlamov	19,263	39–34–4	82	Recap

April: 0–5–0 (Home: 0–3–0; Road: 0–2–0)
#	Date	Visitor	Score	Home	OT	Decision	Attendance	Record	Pts	Recap
78	April 1	Washington	4–2	Colorado		Varlamov	18,049	39–35–4	82	Recap
79	April 3	St. Louis	5–1	Colorado		Varlamov	15,485	39–36–4	82	Recap
80	April 5	Colorado	3–4	Nashville		Varlamov	17,113	39–37–4	82	Recap
81	April 7	Colorado	2–4	Dallas		Pickard	18,532	39–38–4	82	Recap
82	April 9	Anaheim	5–3	Colorado		Varlamov	17,932	39–39–4	82	Recap

Legend: Win (2 points) Loss (0 points) Overtime/shootout loss (1 point)

== Player statistics ==
Final stats

Skaters

Regular season
Player	GP	G	A	Pts	+/−	PIM
Matt Duchene	76	30	29	59	−8	24
Gabriel Landeskog	75	20	33	53	−5	69
Nathan MacKinnon	72	21	31	52	−4	20
Carl Soderberg	82	12	39	51	−7	32
Tyson Barrie	78	13	36	49	−16	31
Jarome Iginla	82	22	25	47	−22	41
Blake Comeau	81	12	24	36	−9	58
Francois Beauchemin	82	8	26	34	−7	38
Erik Johnson	73	11	16	27	−19	50
Mikhail Grigorenko	74	6	21	27	+2	8
Nick Holden	82	6	16	22	−1	24
Alex Tanguay^{‡}	52	4	18	22	+3	24
John Mitchell	71	10	11	21	−7	52
Jack Skille	74	8	6	14	−4	11
Cody McLeod	82	8	5	13	+1	138
Mikkel Boedker^{†}	18	4	8	12	−5	2
Shawn Matthias^{†}	20	6	5	11	−7	8
Andreas Martinsen	55	4	7	11	−4	47
Zach Redmond	37	2	4	6	+5	10
Chris Wagner^{†‡}	26	4	0	4	−2	9
Chris Bigras	31	1	2	3	−2	16
Andrew Bodnarchuk^{†}	21	0	2	2	−1	6
Andrew Agozzino	9	0	2	2	−1	0
Nikita Zadorov	22	0	2	2	−5	12
Brandon Gormley	26	0	1	1	−3	8
Brad Stuart	6	0	0	0	−2	0
Nate Guenin	29	0	0	0	+2	2
Eric Gelinas^{†}	6	0	0	0	+2	0
Ben Street	7	0	0	0	−1	4
Dennis Everberg	15	0	0	0	−5	0
Borna Rendulic	3	0	0	0	−2	0
Mikko Rantanen	9	0	0	0	−7	2

Goaltenders

Regular season
Player	GP	GS	TOI	W	L	OT	GA	GAA	SA	SV%	SO	G	A	PIM
Semyon Varlamov	57	57	3159	27	25	3	148	2.81	1714	.914	2	0	0	6
Calvin Pickard	20	13	985	7	6	1	42	2.56	539	.922	1	0	1	0
Reto Berra	14	12	721	5	8	0	29	2.41	374	.922	2	0	1	2
Roman Will	1	0	18	0	0	0	1	3.33	3	.667	0	0	0	0

^{†}Denotes player spent time with another team before joining the Avalanche. Stats reflect time with the Avalanche only.
^{‡}Traded mid-season
Bold/italics denotes franchise record

=== Suspensions/fines ===
Player	Explanation	Length	Salary	Date issued
Tyson Barrie	Charging and interference against Anaheim Ducks defenseman Simon Despres during NHL Game No. 63 in Anaheim on Friday, October 16, 2015, at 11:30 of the second period.	3 games	$41,935.47	October 17, 2015
Gabriel Landeskog	Illegal check to the head of Boston Bruins forward Brad Marchand during NHL Game No. 230 in Boston on Thursday, November 12, 2015, at 5:46 of the second period.	2 games	$59,907.84	November 13, 2015
Gabriel Landeskog	Cross–check against Anaheim Ducks defenseman Simon Despres during NHL Game No. 1004 in Colorado on Wednesday, March 9, 2016 at 11:29 of the third period.	3 games	$203,832.75	March 10, 2016

== Notable achievements ==
=== Awards ===
Regular season
Player	Award	Awarded
M. Duchene	NHL First Star of the Week	November 16, 2015
M. Duchene	NHL Third Star of the Month	December 1, 2015
S. Varlamov	NHL First Star of the Week	December 21, 2015
M. Duchene	NHL All-Star game selection	January 6, 2016
T. Barrie	NHL Third Star of the Week	January 11, 2016
S. Varlamov	NHL First Star of the Week	January 25, 2016

=== Milestones ===
Regular season
Player	Milestone	Reached
M. Rantanen	1st career NHL game	October 8, 2015
J. Iginla	1,400th career NHL game	October 27, 2015
G. Landeskog	200th career NHL point	October 27, 2015
C. Soderberg	100th career NHL point	November 1, 2015
A. Martinsen	1st career NHL game	November 10, 2015
E. Johnson	200th career NHL point	November 12, 2015
T. Barrie	200th career NHL game	November 14, 2015
A. Martinsen	1st career NHL assist 1st career NHL point	November 14, 2015
B. Comeau	500th career NHL game 200th career NHL point	November 14, 2015
A. Martinsen	1st career NHL goal	November 21, 2015
M. Duchene	200th career NHL assist	November 21, 2015
G. Landeskog	300th career NHL game	November 23, 2015
C. Wagner	1st career NHL goal 1st career NHL point	November 25, 2015
F. Beauchemin	700th career NHL game	December 5, 2015
M. Grigorenko	100th career NHL game	December 27, 2015
N. Guenin	200th career NHL game	December 31, 2015
C. Soderberg	200th career NHL game	January 2, 2016
J. Iginla	600th career NHL goal	January 4, 2016
C. Bigras	1st career NHL game	January 14, 2016
C. Pickard	1st career NHL shutout	January 14, 2016
C. Bigras	1st career NHL assist 1st career NHL point	January 16, 2016
Z. Redmond	100th career NHL game	January 18, 2016
S. Varlamov	300th career NHL game	January 20, 2016
T. Barrie	100th career NHL assist	January 22, 2015
C. McLeod	600th career NHL game	January 26, 2016
R. Will	1st career NHL game	January 26, 2016
E. Johnson	500th career NHL game	February 2, 2016
N. MacKinnon	200th career NHL game	February 4, 2016
N. Holden	200th career NHL game	February 20, 2016
C. Bigras	1st career NHL goal	March 1, 2016
J. Mitchell	100th career NHL assist	March 1, 2016
J. Skille	300th career NHL game	March 3, 2016
C. Soderberg	100th career NHL assist	March 20, 2016
B. Comeau	100th career NHL goal	March 28, 2016
G. Landeskog	100th career NHL goal	April 1, 2016

== Transactions ==
The Colorado Avalanche were involved in the following transactions during the 2015–16 NHL season.

=== Trades ===
Date	Details		Ref
June 26, 2015	To Buffalo Sabres Ryan O'Reilly; Jamie McGinn	To Colorado Avalanche Nikita Zadorov; Mikhail Grigorenko; J. T. Compher; 2nd-round pick in 2015
June 27, 2015	To San Jose Sharks BUF's 2nd-round pick in 2015	To Colorado Avalanche 2nd-round pick in 2015; COL's 2nd-round pick in 2016; COL's 6th-round pick in 2017
September 9, 2015	To Arizona Coyotes Stefan Elliott	To Colorado Avalanche Brandon Gormley
October 4, 2015	To Calgary Flames Freddie Hamilton	To Colorado Avalanche Conditional 7th-round pick in 2016
February 21, 2016	To Toronto Maple Leafs Colin Smith; 4th-round pick in 2016	To Colorado Avalanche Shawn Matthias
February 29, 2016	To Arizona Coyotes Alex Tanguay; Conner Bleackley; Kyle Wood	To Colorado Avalanche Mikkel Boedker
February 29, 2016	To New Jersey Devils 3rd-round pick in 2017	To Colorado Avalanche Eric Gelinas
February 29, 2016	To New York Islanders Marc-Andre Cliche	To Colorado Avalanche Taylor Beck
June 23, 2016	To Florida Panthers Reto Berra	To Colorado Avalanche Rocco Grimaldi

=== Free agents acquired ===
Date	Player	Former team	Contract terms (in U.S. dollars)	Ref
July 1, 2015	Blake Comeau	Pittsburgh Penguins	3 years, $7.2 million	
July 1, 2015	Francois Beauchemin	Anaheim Ducks	3 years, $13.5 million	
October 6, 2015	Jack Skille	Columbus Blue Jackets	1 year	

=== Free agents lost ===
Date	Player	New team	Contract terms (in U.S. dollars)	Ref
July 2, 2015	Jordan Caron	St. Louis Blues	1 year, $600,000	

=== Claimed via waivers ===
Player	Former team	Date claimed off waivers	Ref
Chris Wagner	Anaheim Ducks	November 15, 2015	
Andrew Bodnarchuk	Columbus Blue Jackets	January 5, 2016	

=== Lost via waivers ===
Player	New team	Date claimed off waivers	Ref
Chris Wagner	Anaheim Ducks	February 25, 2016	

=== Lost via retirement ===
Date	Player	Ref

=== Player signings ===
Date	Player	Contract terms (in U.S. dollars)	Ref
June 26, 2015	Carl Soderberg	5 years, $23.75 million	
July 13, 2015	Mikko Rantanen	3 years, entry-level contract	
July 16, 2015	Mikhail Grigorenko	1 year, $675,000	
July 16, 2015	Andrew Agozzino	1 year, $600,000	
July 16, 2015	Mat Clark	2 years, $1.2 million	
July 27, 2015	Joey Hishon	1 year, $890,000	
August 6, 2015	Calvin Pickard	1 year, $850,500	
August 21, 2015	Sami Aittokallio	1 year, $735,000	
September 22, 2015	Erik Johnson	7 years, $42 million contract extension	
March 9, 2016	Julien Nantel	3 years, entry-level contract	
April 25, 2016	J. T. Compher	3 years, entry-level contract	
May 24, 2016	Anton Lindholm	3 years, entry-level contract	
May 27, 2016	Sergei Boikov	3 years, entry-level contract	

== Draft picks ==
Below are the Colorado Avalanche's selections at the 2015 NHL entry draft, to be held on June 26–27, 2015 at the BB&T Center in Sunrise, Florida.

Round	#	Player	Pos	Nationality	College/Junior/Club team (League)
1	10	Mikko Rantanen	RW	Finland	TPS (Liiga)
2	39^{[a]}	A. J. Greer	LW	Canada	Boston University (Hockey East)
2	40	Nicolas Meloche	D	Canada	Baie-Comeau Drakkar (QMJHL)
3	71	Jean-Christophe Beaudin	C	Canada	Rouyn-Noranda Huskies (QMJHL)
4	101	Andrei Mironov	D	Russia	Dynamo Moscow (KHL)
6	161	Sergei Boikov	D	Russia	Drummondville Voltigeurs (QMJHL)
7	191	Gustav Olhaver	C	Sweden	Rogle BK Jr. (Sweden-Jr.)

Draft notes

- ^{[a]} The San Jose Sharks' second-round pick went to the Colorado Avalanche as the result of a trade on June 27, 2015 that sent Buffalo's second-round pick in 2015 (31st overall) to San Jose in exchange for Colorado's second-round pick in 2016, Colorado's sixth-round pick in 2017 and this pick.
- The Colorado Avalanche's fifth-round pick will go to the Montreal Canadiens as the result of a trade on June 30, 2014 that sent Daniel Briere to Colorado in exchange for P. A. Parenteau and this pick.
