= 2015–16 Detroit Red Wings season =

National Hockey League team season

2015–16 Detroit Red Wings
- Division: 3rd Atlantic
- Conference: 8th Eastern
- 2015–16 record: 41–30–11
- Home record: 22–13–6
- Road record: 19–17–5
- Goals for: 211
- Goals against: 224

Team information
- General manager: Ken Holland
- Coach: Jeff Blashill
- Captain: Henrik Zetterberg
- Alternate captains: Pavel Datsyuk; Niklas Kronwall
- Arena: Joe Louis Arena
- Average attendance: 20,027 (100%); Total: 821,107
- Minor league affiliates: Grand Rapids Griffins (AHL); Toledo Walleye (ECHL)

Team leaders
- Goals: Dylan Larkin (23)
- Assists: Henrik Zetterberg (37)
- Points: Henrik Zetterberg (50)
- Penalty minutes: Justin Abdelkader (120)
- Plus/minus: Dylan Larkin (+11)
- Wins: Petr Mrazek (27)
- Goals against average: Petr Mrazek (2.33)

The 2015–16 Detroit Red Wings season was the 90th season for the National Hockey League (NHL) franchise that was established on September 25, 1926. The regular season began on October 9, 2015, against the Toronto Maple Leafs, and former Red Wings head coach Mike Babcock, with a 4–0 victory. This season saw the Red Wings extend their playoff streak to 25 straight seasons, the longest in North American professional sports at the time. However, this would be the final season of that quarter-century at or near the top of the league for the franchise, and as of 2026, this remains the most recent season in which the Red Wings have made the playoffs.

== Off-season ==
On June 9, 2015, Jeff Blashill was named the head coach of the Red Wings, following the departure of Mike Babcock to the Toronto Maple Leafs.

On June 23, 2015, the Red Wings finalized their coaching staff, Tony Granato will return as an assistant coach, along with Pat Ferschweiler, who was an assistant coach under Blashill with the Grand Rapids Griffins. Dave Noel-Bernier was named video coach, and Chris Chelios will evaluate in-game player performance, and will continue to play a role in player development, by working on-ice with the team's defensemen during practices. Jim Bedard will return for his 19th season with the organization as goaltending coach.

== Standings ==
Atlantic Division
Pos	Team	GP	W	L	OTL	ROW	GF	GA	GD	Pts
1	y – Florida Panthers	82	47	26	9	40	239	203	+36	103
2	x – Tampa Bay Lightning	82	46	31	5	43	227	201	+26	97
3	x – Detroit Red Wings	82	41	30	11	39	211	224	−13	93
4	Boston Bruins	82	42	31	9	38	240	230	+10	93
5	Ottawa Senators	82	38	35	9	32	236	247	−11	85
6	Montreal Canadiens	82	38	38	6	33	221	236	−15	82
7	Buffalo Sabres	82	35	36	11	33	201	222	−21	81
8	Toronto Maple Leafs	82	29	42	11	23	198	246	−48	69

Source: National Hockey League
x – Clinched playoff spot; y – Clinched division

== Schedule and results ==
=== Pre-season ===
2015 preseason game log: 6–0–2 (Home: 3–0–1; Road: 3–0–1)
#	Date	Visitor	Score	Home	OT	Decision	Attendance	Record	Recap
1	September 22	Detroit	4–5	Chicago	OT	McCollum	20,736	0–0–1	Recap
2	September 23	Chicago	1–4	Detroit		Coreau	16,886	1–0–1	Recap
3	September 24	Pittsburgh	1–6	Detroit		Howard	15,677	2–0–1	Recap
4	September 26	Boston	4–5	Detroit	OT	Mrazek	––	2–0–2	Recap
5	September 28	Detroit	3–1	Boston		Howard	16,681	3–0–2	Recap
6	September 30	Detroit	7–2	Pittsburgh		Mrazek	18,207	4–0–2	Recap
7	October 2	Toronto	2–4	Detroit		Howard	19,149	5–0–2	Recap
8	October 3	Detroit	2–1	Toronto		Mrazek	17,879	6–0–2	Recap

=== Regular season ===
2015–16 game log

October: 5–5–1 (Home: 2–3–0; Road: 3–2–1)
#	Date	Visitor	Score	Home	OT	Decision	Attendance	Record	Pts	Recap
1	October 9	Toronto	0–4	Detroit		Howard	20,027	1–0–0	2	Recap
2	October 10	Detroit	4–3	Carolina		Mrazek	18,949	2–0–0	4	Recap
3	October 13	Tampa Bay	1–3	Detroit		Howard	20,027	3–0–0	6	Recap
4	October 16	Carolina	5–3	Detroit		Howard	20,027	3–1–0	6	Recap
5	October 17	Detroit	1–4	Montreal		Mrazek	21,288	3–2–0	6	Recap
6	October 21	Detroit	1–3	Edmonton		Mrazek	16,839	3–3–0	6	Recap
7	October 23	Detroit	2–3	Calgary	OT	Howard	19,158	3–3–1	7	Recap
8	October 24	Detroit	3–2	Vancouver	OT	Mrazek	18,312	4–3–1	9	Recap
9	October 27	Carolina	3–1	Detroit		Mrazek	20,027	4–4–1	9	Recap
10	October 30	Ottawa	3–1	Detroit		Howard	20,027	4–5–1	9	Recap
11	October 31	Detroit	5–3	Ottawa		Mrazek	16,964	5–5–1	11	Recap

November: 7–3–3 (Home: 4–2–3; Road: 3–1–0)
#	Date	Visitor	Score	Home	OT	Decision	Attendance	Record	Pts	Recap
12	November 3	Tampa Bay	1–2	Detroit		Howard	20,027	6–5–1	13	Recap
13	November 6	Detroit	2–1	Toronto	OT	Mrazek	19,680	7–5–1	15	Recap
14	November 8	Dallas	4–1	Detroit		Howard	20,027	7–6–1	15	Recap
15	November 10	Washington	0–1	Detroit		Mrazek	20,027	8–6–1	17	Recap
16	November 13	San Jose	3–2	Detroit		Howard	20,027	8–7–1	17	Recap
17	November 14	Detroit	1–3	Boston		Mrazek	17,565	8–8–1	17	Recap
18	November 16	Detroit	4–3	Ottawa	OT	Howard	16,718	9–8–1	19	Recap
19	November 18	Washington	2–1	Detroit	OT	Mrazek	20,027	9–8–2	20	Recap
20	November 20	Los Angeles	2–3	Detroit		Mrazek	20,027	10–8–2	22	Recap
21	November 21	Detroit	4–3	St. Louis	OT	Howard	18,098	11–8–2	24	Recap
22	November 25	Boston	3–2	Detroit	OT	Mrazek	20,027	11–8–3	25	Recap
23	November 27	Edmonton	3–4	Detroit	OT	Howard	20,027	12–8–3	27	Recap
24	November 29	Florida	2–1	Detroit	OT	Mrazek	20,027	12–8–4	28	Recap

December: 6–5–3 (Home: 5–3–1; Road: 1–2–2)
#	Date	Visitor	Score	Home	OT	Decision	Attendance	Record	Pts	Recap
25	December 1	Buffalo	4–5	Detroit	SO	Mrazek	20,027	13–8–4	30	Recap
26	December 3	Arizona	1–5	Detroit		Howard	20,027	14–8–4	32	Recap
27	December 5	Nashville	4–5	Detroit	OT	Mrazek	20,027	15–8–4	34	Recap
28	December 8	Detroit	2–3	Washington	SO	Howard	18,506	15–8–5	35	Recap
29	December 10	Montreal	2–3	Detroit		Mrazek	20,027	16–8–5	37	Recap
30	December 11	Detroit	2–3	New Jersey	OT	Howard	16,514	16–8–6	38	Recap
31	December 14	Buffalo	2–1	Detroit		Mrazek	20,027	16–9–6	38	Recap
32	December 18	Vancouver	4–3	Detroit	SO	Howard	20,027	16–9–7	39	Recap
33	December 20	Calgary	2–4	Detroit		Mrazek	20,027	17–9–7	41	Recap
34	December 22	New Jersey	4–3	Detroit		Mrazek	20,027	17–10–7	41	Recap
35	December 26	Detroit	3–2	Nashville		Mrazek	17,208	18–10–7	43	Recap
36	December 28	Detroit	1–3	Minnesota		Mrazek	19,110	18–11–7	43	Recap
37	December 29	Detroit	1–4	Winnipeg		Howard	15,294	18–12–7	43	Recap
38	December 31	Pittsburgh	5–2	Detroit		Mrazek	20,027	18–13–7	43	Recap

January: 7–3–1 (Home: 0–2–1; Road: 7–1–0)
#	Date	Visitor	Score	Home	OT	Decision	Attendance	Record	Pts	Recap
39	January 2	Detroit	4–3	Buffalo		Mrazek	19,070	19–13–7	45	Recap
40	January 4	Detroit	1–0	New Jersey		Mrazek	15,547	20–13–7	47	Recap
41	January 7	Detroit	2–1	San Jose		Mrazek	16,856	21–13–7	49	Recap
42	January 10	Detroit	2–1	Anaheim		Mrazek	17,174	22–13–7	51	Recap
43	January 11	Detroit	2–4	Los Angeles		Howard	18,230	22–14–7	51	Recap
44	January 14	Detroit	3–2	Arizona	OT	Mrazek	12,014	23–14–7	53	Recap
45	January 17	Philadelphia	2–1	Detroit	SO	Mrazek	20,027	23–14–8	54	Recap
46	January 20	St. Louis	2–1	Detroit		Mrazek	20,027	23–15–8	54	Recap
47	January 22	Detroit	3–0	Buffalo		Mrazek	18,601	24–15–8	56	Recap
48	January 23	Anaheim	4–3	Detroit		Howard	20,027	24–16–8	56	Recap
49	January 25	Detroit	4–2	N.Y. Islanders		Mrazek	12,086	25–16–8	58	Recap

February: 7–4–3 (Home: 5–0–1; Road: 2–4–2)
#	Date	Visitor	Score	Home	OT	Decision	Attendance	Record	Pts	Recap
50	February 3	Detroit	1–3	Tampa Bay		Mrazek	19,092	25–17–8	58	Recap
51	February 4	Detroit	3–6	Florida		Howard	16,991	25–18–8	58	Recap
52	February 6	N.Y. Islanders	1–5	Detroit		Mrazek	20,027	26–18–8	60	Recap
53	February 8	Florida	0–3	Detroit		Mrazek	20,027	27–18–8	62	Recap
54	February 10	Ottawa	1–3	Detroit		Mrazek	20,027	28–18–8	64	Recap
55	February 12	Colorado	3–2	Detroit	SO	Mrazek	20,027	28–18–9	65	Recap
56	February 14	Boston	5–6	Detroit		Mrazek	20,027	29–18–9	67	Recap
57	February 15	Detroit	1–4	N.Y. Islanders		Howard	15,795	29–19–9	67	Recap
58	February 18	Detroit	3–6	Pittsburgh		Mrazek	18,584	29–20–9	67	Recap
59	February 20	Detroit	2–3	Ottawa	SO	Mrazek	18,930	29–20–10	68	Recap
60	February 21	Detroit	0–1	N.Y. Rangers	OT	Howard	18,006	29–20–11	69	Recap
61	February 23	Columbus	1–2	Detroit	SO	Mrazek	20,027	30–20–11	71	Recap
62	February 27^{1}	Detroit	5–3	Colorado		Mrazek	50,095	31–20–11	73	Recap
63	February 29	Detroit	3–2	Dallas	OT	Howard	18,532	32–20–11	75	Recap
Outdoor game, played at Coors Field.

March: 6–8–0 (Home: 4–3–0; Road: 2–5–0)
#	Date	Visitor	Score	Home	OT	Decision	Attendance	Record	Pts	Recap
64	March 2	Chicago	5–2	Detroit		Mrazek	20,027	32–21–11	75	Recap
65	March 6	Detroit	1–4	Chicago		Mrazek	22,247	32–22–11	75	Recap
66	March 8	Detroit	3–5	Columbus		Howard	14,426	32–23–11	75	Recap
67	March 10	Winnipeg	2–3	Detroit		Mrazek	20,027	33–23–11	77	Recap
68	March 12	N.Y. Rangers	2–3	Detroit	OT	Mrazek	20,027	34–23–11	79	Recap
69	March 13	Toronto	1–0	Detroit		Mrazek	20,027	34–24–11	79	Recap
70	March 15	Detroit	3–4	Philadelphia		Mrazek	19,806	34–25–11	79	Recap
71	March 17	Detroit	3–1	Columbus		Howard	14,415	35–25–11	81	Recap
72	March 19	Detroit	5–3	Florida		Howard	20,817	36–25–11	83	Recap
73	March 22	Detroit	2–6	Tampa Bay		Howard	19,092	36–26–11	83	Recap
74	March 24	Montreal	3–4	Detroit		Mrazek	20,027	37–26–11	85	Recap
75	March 26	Pittsburgh	7–2	Detroit		Mrazek	20,027	37–27–11	85	Recap
76	March 28	Buffalo	2–3	Detroit		Howard	20,027	38–27–11	87	Recap
77	March 29	Detroit	3–4	Montreal		Howard	21,288	38–28–11	87	Recap

April: 3–2–0 (Home: 2–0–0; Road: 1–2–0)
#	Date	Visitor	Score	Home	OT	Decision	Attendance	Record	Pts	Recap
78	April 1	Minnesota	2–3	Detroit		Howard	20,027	39–28–11	89	Recap
79	April 2	Detroit	3–2	Toronto		Howard	19,371	40–28–11	91	Recap
80	April 6	Philadelphia	0–3	Detroit		Howard	20,027	41–28–11	93	Recap
81	April 7	Detroit	2–5	Boston		Howard	17,565	41–29–11	93	Recap
82	April 9	Detroit	2–3	N.Y. Rangers		Howard	18,006	41–30–11	93	Recap

Legend: Win (2 points) Loss (0 points) Overtime/shootout loss (1 point)

=== Playoffs ===
2016 Stanley Cup playoffs

Eastern Conference First Round vs. (A2) Tampa Bay Lightning: Tampa Bay won 4–1
#	Date	Visitor	Score	Home	OT	Decision	Attendance	Series	Recap
1	April 13	Detroit	2–3	Tampa Bay		Howard	19,092	0–1	Recap
2	April 15	Detroit	2–5	Tampa Bay		Howard	19,092	0–2	Recap
3	April 17	Tampa Bay	0–2	Detroit		Mrazek	20,027	1–2	Recap
4	April 19	Tampa Bay	3–2	Detroit		Mrazek	20,027	1–3	Recap
5	April 21	Detroit	0–1	Tampa Bay		Mrazek	19,092	1–4	Recap

Legend: Win Loss

== Player statistics ==
=== Skaters ===
Regular season
Player	GP	G	A	Pts	+/−	PIM
Henrik Zetterberg	82	13	37	50	−15	24
Pavel Datsyuk	66	16	33	49	7	14
Dylan Larkin	80	23	22	45	11	34
Tomas Tatar	81	21	24	45	4	24
Gustav Nyquist	82	17	26	43	−2	34
Justin Abdelkader	82	19	23	42	−16	120
Mike Green	74	7	28	35	−6	38
Brad Richards	68	10	18	28	4	8
Darren Helm	77	13	13	26	−2	32
Niklas Kronwall	64	3	23	26	−21	30
Riley Sheahan	81	14	11	25	−8	12
Luke Glendening	81	8	13	21	4	46
Danny DeKeyser	78	8	12	20	2	44
Jonathan Ericsson	71	3	12	15	2	56
Brendan Smith	63	3	12	15	1	62
Andreas Athanasiou	37	9	5	14	1	5
Teemu Pulkkinen	36	6	6	12	2	14
Kyle Quincey	47	4	7	11	1	36
Alexei Marchenko	66	2	9	11	−5	10
Tomas Jurco	44	4	2	6	−6	16
Jakub Kindl^{‡}	25	2	4	6	3	14
Anthony Mantha	10	2	1	3	−6	2
Joakim Andersson	29	1	2	3	1	6
Drew Miller	28	1	1	2	−5	2
Johan Franzen	2	0	1	1	0	2
Xavier Ouellet	5	0	1	1	−2	0
Eric Tangradi	1	0	0	0	0	0
Tomas Nosek	6	0	0	0	−2	2
Landon Ferraro^{‡}	11	0	0	0	−3	7

Playoffs
Player	GP	G	A	Pts	+/−	PIM
Tomas Tatar	5	0	3	3	1	2
Mike Green	5	1	1	2	−1	10
Dylan Larkin	5	1	0	1	−2	18
Justin Abdelkader	5	1	0	1	−3	35
Darren Helm	5	1	0	1	−1	6
Gustav Nyquist	5	1	0	1	2	6
Andreas Athanasiou	5	1	0	1	1	0
Henrik Zetterberg	5	1	0	1	3	4
Brad Richards	5	1	0	1	−4	7
Luke Glendening	5	0	1	1	−2	0
Niklas Kronwall	5	0	1	1	3	8
Jonathan Ericsson	5	0	1	1	0	2
Kyle Quincey	4	0	1	1	−2	4
Brendan Smith	3	0	1	1	2	0
Joakim Andersson	5	0	1	1	−1	2
Riley Sheahan	5	0	1	1	0	4
Danny DeKeyser	5	0	1	1	−3	4
Pavel Datsyuk	5	0	0	0	2	4
Alexei Marchenko	3	0	0	0	−1	10

=== Goaltenders ===
Regular season
Player	GP	GS	TOI	W	L	OT	GA	GAA	SA	SV%	SO	G	A	PIM
Petr Mrazek	54	49	2961	27	16	6	115	2.33	1448	.921	4	0	2	2
Jimmy Howard	37	33	1974	14	14	5	92	2.80	979	.906	2	0	1	2

Goaltenders

Playoffs
Player	GP	GS	TOI	W	L	GA	GAA	SA	SV%	SO	G	A	PIM
Petr Mrazek	3	3	177	1	2	4	1.36	73	.945	1	0	0	0
Jimmy Howard	2	2	117	0	2	7	3.59	64	.891	0	0	0	0

^{†}Denotes player spent time with another team before joining the Red Wings. Stats reflect time with the Red Wings only.
^{‡}Traded mid-season
Bold/italics denotes franchise record

=== Player suspensions/fines ===
Player	Explanation	Length	Salary	Date issued
Teemu Pulkkinen	Diving/Embellishment during NHL Game No. 211 in Dallas on Sunday, November 8, 2015, at 12:36 of the first period.	—	$2,000.00	November 13, 2015

== Awards and honours ==
=== Awards ===
Regular season
Player	Award	Awarded
Justin Abdelkader	NHL First Star of the Week	October 12, 2015
Dylan Larkin	NHL Rookie of the Month	December 1, 2015
Dylan Larkin	NHL All-Star game selection	January 6, 2016
Petr Mrazek	NHL Second Star of the Week	January 11, 2016
Pavel Datsyuk	NHL First Star of the Week	February 15, 2016

=== Milestones ===
Regular season
Player	Milestone	Reached
Dylan Larkin	1st Career NHL Game; 1st Career NHL Assist; 1st Career NHL Goal; 1st Career NHL Point	October 9, 2015
Jeff Blashill	1st Career NHL Win (coach)	October 9, 2015
Justin Abdelkader	400th Career NHL Game	October 10, 2015
Tomas Jurco	100th Career NHL Game	October 13, 2015
Brendan Smith	200th Career NHL Game	October 23, 2015
Petr Mrazek	1st Career NHL Assist; 1st Career NHL Point	October 24, 2015
Henrik Zetterberg	500th Career NHL Assist; 800th Career NHL Point	October 31, 2015
Drew Miller	500th Career NHL Game	November 3, 2015
Henrik Zetterberg	300th Career NHL Goal	November 6, 2015
Andreas Athanasiou	1st Career NHL Game	November 8, 2015
Andreas Athanasiou	1st Career NHL Goal; 1st Career NHL Point	November 10, 2015
Tomas Tatar	200th Career NHL Game	November 16, 2015
Gustav Nyquist	200th Career NHL Game	November 21, 2015
Pavel Datsyuk	300th Career NHL Goal	November 25, 2015
Drew Miller	100th Career NHL Point with Detroit	December 1, 2015
Niklas Kronwall	700th Career NHL Game	December 3, 2015
Pavel Datsyuk	900th Career NHL Game	December 8, 2015
Mike Green	600th Career NHL Game	December 14, 2015
Tomas Nosek	1st Career NHL Game	December 26, 2015
Joakim Andersson	200th Career NHL Game	January 20, 2016
Danny DeKeyser	200th Career NHL Game	January 23, 2016
Andreas Athanasiou	1st Career NHL Assist	February 6, 2016
Brad Richards	1,100th Career NHL Game	February 14, 2016
Pavel Datsyuk	900th Career NHL Point	February 14, 2016
Henrik Zetterberg	900th Career NHL Game	March 2, 2016
Anthony Mantha	1st Career NHL Game	March 15, 2016
Anthony Mantha	1st Career NHL Assist; 1st Career NHL Point	March 22, 2016
Anthony Mantha	1st Career NHL Goal	March 24, 2016
Pavel Datsyuk	600th Career NHL Assist	March 26, 2016

Playoffs
Player	Milestone	Reached
Dylan Larkin	1st Career NHL Playoff Game	April 13, 2016
Andreas Athanasiou	1st Career NHL Playoff Game	April 13, 2016
Dylan Larkin	1st Career NHL Playoff Goal; 1st Career NHL Playoff Point	April 15, 2016
Andreas Athanasiou	1st Career NHL Playoff Goal; 1st Career NHL Playoff Point	April 17, 2016

== Transactions ==
The Red Wings have been involved in the following transactions during the 2015–16 season:

=== Trades ===
Date	Details		Ref
January 15, 2016	To St. Louis Blues Richard Nedomlel	To Detroit Red Wings Future considerations
February 27, 2016	To Florida Panthers Jakub Kindl ^{[a]}	To Detroit Red Wings 6th round pick in 2017
May 26, 2016	To San Jose Sharks 3rd round pick in 2017	To Detroit Red Wings Dylan Sadowy

Notes

- ^{a} Detroit to retain 15% ($720,000) of salary as part of trade.

=== Free agents acquired ===
Date	Player	Former team	Contract terms (in U.S. dollars)	Ref
July 1, 2015	Mike Green	Washington Capitals	3 years, $18 million	
July 1, 2015	Brad Richards	Chicago Blackhawks	1 year, $4 million	
July 8, 2015	Eric Tangradi	Montreal Canadiens	1 year, $575,000	
August 16, 2015	Robbie Russo	University of Notre Dame	2 years, entry-level contract	

=== Free agents lost ===
Date	Player	New team	Contract terms (in U.S. dollars)	Ref
July 1, 2015	Kevin Porter	Pittsburgh Penguins	1 year, $575,000	
October 4, 2015	Jonas Gustavsson	Boston Bruins	1 year, $750,000	

=== Lost via waivers ===
Player	New team	Date	Ref
Landon Ferraro	Boston Bruins	November 22, 2015	

=== Player signings ===
Date	Player	Contract terms (in U.S. dollars)	Ref
June 26, 2015	Joakim Andersson	1 year, $815,000 contract extension	
June 30, 2015	Brendan Smith	2 years, $5.5 million contract extension	
July 1, 2015	Andy Miele	1 year, $575,000	
July 1, 2015	Tom McCollum	1 year, $600,000	
July 3, 2015	Vili Saarijarvi	3 years, entry-level contract	
July 5, 2015	Landon Ferraro	1 year, two-way contract	
July 9, 2015	Jared Coreau	1 year, $600,000	
July 10, 2015	Gustav Nyquist	4 years, $19 million contract extension	
July 13, 2015	Mitch Callahan	1 year, $600,000	
July 13, 2015	Nick Jensen	2 years, $1.764 million	
July 15, 2015	Louis-Marc Aubry	1 year, $575,000	
July 21, 2015	Teemu Pulkkinen	1 year, $735,000	
July 24, 2015	Tomas Jurco	2 years, $1.8 million	
September 4, 2015	Daniel Cleary	1 year, $950,000	
October 2, 2015	Evgeny Svechnikov	3 years, entry-level contract	
November 12, 2015	Justin Abdelkader	7 years, $29.75 million contract extension	
November 16, 2015	Xavier Ouellet	1 year, $715,000 contract extension	
March 21, 2016	Eric Tangradi	2 years, $1.25 million contract extension	
May 27, 2016	Tomas Nosek	2 years, $1.225 million contract extension	
May 31, 2016	Dylan Sadowy	3 years, entry-level contract	
June 16, 2016	Riley Sheahan	2 years, $4.15 million contract extension	
June 16, 2016	Brian Lashoff	1 year, $650,000 contract extension	

== Draft picks ==
The Detroit Red Wings' picks at the 2015 NHL entry draft, held on June 26–27, 2015 at the BB&T Center in Sunrise, Florida.

Round	#	Player	Pos	Nationality	College/Junior/Club team (League)
1	19	Evgeny Svechnikov	LW	Russia	Cape Breton Screaming Eagles (QMJHL)
3	73^{[a]}	Vili Saarijarvi	D	Finland	Green Bay Gamblers (USHL)
4	110	Joren van Pottelberghe	G	Switzerland	Linköpings HC (J20 SuperElit)
5	140	Chase Pearson	C	Canada	Youngstown Phantoms (USHL)
6	170	Patrick Holway	D	United States	Boston Advantage U18 (MWEHL)
7	200	Adam Marsh	LW	United States	Saint John Sea Dogs (QMJHL)

Draft notes

- The Detroit Red Wings' second-round pick went to the Dallas Stars as the result of a trade on March 1, 2015, that sent Erik Cole and a conditional third-round pick in 2015 to Detroit in exchange for Mattias Janmark, Mattias Backman and this pick.
- ^{a} The Dallas Stars' third-round pick went to the Detroit Red Wings as the result of a trade on March 1, 2015, that sent Mattias Janmark, Mattias Backman, and a second-round pick in 2015 to Dallas in exchange for Erik Cole and this pick (being conditional at the time of the trade). The condition – Detroit will receive a third-round pick in 2015 if they do not qualify for the 2015 Eastern Conference Final and Cole does not play in 50% of Detroit's playoff games – was converted on April 8, 2015, when Cole was injured for the remainder of the season.
- The Detroit Red Wings' third-round pick went to the Anaheim Ducks as the result of a trade on March 2, 2015, that sent Rene Bourque, William Karlsson and a second-round pick in 2015 to Columbus in exchange for James Wisniewski and this pick.
  Columbus previously acquired this pick as the result of a trade on June 28, 2014, that sent Edmonton's third-round pick in 2014 to Detroit in exchange for a third-round pick in 2014 and this pick.
