= 2015–16 Florida Panthers season =

Season of play of professional ice hockey team

2015–16 Florida Panthers
- Atlantic Division champions
- Division: 1st Atlantic
- Conference: 3rd Eastern
- 2015–16 record: 47–26–9
- Home record: 25–11–5
- Road record: 22–15–4
- Goals for: 239
- Goals against: 203

Team information
- General manager: Dale Tallon
- Coach: Gerard Gallant
- Captain: Willie Mitchell
- Alternate captains: Dave Bolland; Brian Campbell; Jussi Jokinen; Derek MacKenzie
- Arena: BB&T Center
- Minor league affiliate: Portland Pirates (AHL)

Team leaders
- Goals: Aleksander Barkov (28)
- Assists: Jussi Jokinen (42)
- Points: Jaromir Jagr (66)
- Penalty minutes: Alex Petrovic (90)
- Plus/minus: Brian Campbell (+31)
- Wins: Roberto Luongo (35)
- Goals against average: Al Montoya (2.18)

The 2015–16 Florida Panthers season was the 22nd season for the National Hockey League (NHL) franchise that was established on June 14, 1993. The Panthers' regular season began on October 10, 2015, against the Philadelphia Flyers with a 7–1 home win. The Panthers won the Atlantic Division but fell in six games in the opening round of the playoffs to the wild card entrant New York Islanders.

== Standings ==
Atlantic Division
Pos	Team	GP	W	L	OTL	ROW	GF	GA	GD	Pts
1	y – Florida Panthers	82	47	26	9	40	239	203	+36	103
2	x – Tampa Bay Lightning	82	46	31	5	43	227	201	+26	97
3	x – Detroit Red Wings	82	41	30	11	39	211	224	−13	93
4	Boston Bruins	82	42	31	9	38	240	230	+10	93
5	Ottawa Senators	82	38	35	9	32	236	247	−11	85
6	Montreal Canadiens	82	38	38	6	33	221	236	−15	82
7	Buffalo Sabres	82	35	36	11	33	201	222	−21	81
8	Toronto Maple Leafs	82	29	42	11	23	198	246	−48	69

Source: National Hockey League
x – Clinched playoff spot; y – Clinched division

== Schedule and results ==
=== Pre-season ===
2015 preseason game log: 3–3–0 (Home: 1–1–0; Road: 2–2–0)
#	Date	Visitor	Score	Home	OT	Decision	Attendance	Record	Recap
1	September 20	Florida	2–5	Nashville		McKenna	15,432	0–1–0
2	September 20	Florida	3–2	Nashville	OT	Brittain	12,711	1–1–0
3	September 22	Dallas	2–3	Florida		Luongo	5,504	2–1–0
4	September 25	Florida	1–4	Tampa Bay		Montoya	16,226	2–2–0
5	September 27	Florida	4–2	Dallas		Luongo	10,113	3–2–0
6	October 3	Tampa Bay	3–2	Florida		Luongo	7,634	3–3–0

=== Regular season ===
2015–16 game log

October: 5–4–2 (Home: 3–2–1; Road: 2–2–1)
#	Date	Visitor	Score	Home	OT	Decision	Attendance	Record	Pts	Recap
1	October 10	Philadelphia	1–7	Florida		Luongo	19,434	1–0–0	2
2	October 12	Florida	0–1	Philadelphia		Luongo	19,769	1–1–0	2
3	October 13	Florida	4–1	Carolina		Montoya	10,901	2–1–0	4
4	October 15	Buffalo	2–3	Florida		Luongo	11,616	3–1–0	6
5	October 17	Dallas	4–2	Florida		Luongo	12,834	3–2–0	6
6	October 20	Florida	2–3	Pittsburgh	OT	Luongo	18,471	3–2–1	7
7	October 22	Florida	2–3	Chicago		Luongo	21,591	3–3–1	7
8	October 24	Florida	6–2	Dallas		Montoya	18,532	4–3–1	9
9	October 27	Colorado	1–4	Florida		Luongo	11,694	5–3–1	11
10	October 30	Boston	3–1	Florida		Luongo	14,112	5–4–1	11
11	October 31	Washington	2–1	Florida	OT	Montoya	11,207	5–4–2	12

November: 5–5–2 (Home: 3–3–1; Road: 2–2–1)
#	Date	Visitor	Score	Home	OT	Decision	Attendance	Record	Pts	Recap
12	November 4	Florida	2–3	Anaheim	SO	Luongo	15,169	5–4–3	13
13	November 5	Florida	2–5	San Jose		Montoya	15,525	5–5–3	13
14	November 7	Florida	1–4	Los Angeles		Luongo	18,230	5–6–3	13
15	November 10	Calgary	3–4	Florida		Luongo	11,242	6–6–3	15
16	November 12	Buffalo	3–2	Florida		Luongo	11,271	6–7–3	15
17	November 14	Florida	5–4	Tampa Bay	SO	Luongo	19,092	7–7–3	17
18	November 16	Tampa Bay	0–1	Florida		Luongo	12,067	8–7–3	19
19	November 19	Anaheim	3–1	Florida		Luongo	10,947	8–8–3	19
20	November 21	NY Rangers	5–4	Florida	OT	Luongo	17,866	8–8–4	20
21	November 23	Los Angeles	3–1	Florida		Luongo	10,997	8–9–4	20
22	November 27	NY Islanders	2–3	Florida	SO	Luongo	14,598	9–9–4	22
23	November 29	Florida	2–1	Detroit	OT	Luongo	20,027	10–9–4	24

December: 11–3–0 (Home: 5–1–0; Road: 6–2–0)
#	Date	Visitor	Score	Home	OT	Decision	Attendance	Record	Pts	Recap
24	December 1	Florida	3–1	St. Louis		Luongo	15,395	11–9–4	26
25	December 3	Florida	2–1	Nashville		Luongo	15,405	12–9–4	28
26	December 4	Florida	2–1	Columbus	SO	Montoya	14,162	13–9–4	30
27	December 6	Florida	2–4	New Jersey		Luongo	13,643	13–10–4	30
28	December 8	Ottawa	4–2	Florida		Luongo	11,571	13–11–4	30
29	December 10	Washington	1–4	Florida		Montoya	12,810	14–11–4	32
30	December 12	Florida	1–3	Boston		Luongo	17,565	14–12–4	32
31	December 15	Florida	5–1	NY Islanders		Luongo	13,656	15–12–4	34
32	December 17	Florida	5–1	New Jersey		Montoya	12,512	16–12–4	36
33	December 18	Florida	2–0	Carolina		Luongo	10,511	17–12–4	38
34	December 20	Vancouver	4–5	Florida	SO	Luongo	13,459	18–12–4	40
35	December 22	Ottawa	1–2	Florida	SO	Luongo	14,538	19–12–4	42
36	December 27	Columbus	2–3	Florida		Luongo	16,902	20–12–4	44
37	December 29	Montreal	1–3	Florida		Luongo	19,822	21–12–4	46

January: 8–3–1 (Home: 5–1–0; Road: 3–2–1)
#	Date	Visitor	Score	Home	OT	Decision	Attendance	Record	Pts	Recap
38	January 2	NY Rangers	0–3	Florida		Luongo	20,289	22–12–4	48
39	January 3	Minnesota	1–2	Florida	OT	Montoya	15,426	23–12–4	50
40	January 5	Florida	5–1	Buffalo		Luongo	18,560	24–12–4	52
41	January 7	Florida	3–2	Ottawa		Luongo	17,150	25–12–4	54
42	January 10	Florida	2–1	Edmonton		Montoya	16,839	26–12–4	56
43	January 11	Florida	2–3	Vancouver	OT	Luongo	18,570	26–12–5	57
44	January 13	Florida	0–6	Calgary		Luongo	18,702	26–13–5	57
45	January 17	Florida	1–3	Tampa Bay		Luongo	19,092	26–14–5	57
46	January 18	Edmonton	4–2	Florida		Montoya	14,897	26–15–5	57
47	January 22	Chicago	0–4	Florida		Luongo	19,343	27–15–5	59
48	January 23	Tampa Bay	2–5	Florida		Luongo	19,626	28–15–5	61
49	January 26	Toronto	1–5	Florida		Luongo	14,585	29–15–5	63

February: 6–4–3 (Home: 4–2–2; Road: 2–2–1)
#	Date	Visitor	Score	Home	OT	Decision	Attendance	Record	Pts	Recap
50	February 2	Florida	5–2	Washington		Montoya	18,506	30–15–5	65
51	February 4	Detroit	3–6	Florida		Luongo	16,991	31–15–5	67
52	February 6	Pittsburgh	3–2	Florida	OT	Luongo	20,295	31–15–6	68
53	February 8	Florida	0–3	Detroit		Montoya	20,027	31–16–6	68
54	February 9	Florida	7–4	Buffalo		Luongo	18,837	32–16–6	70
55	February 12	St. Louis	5–3	Florida		Montoya	13,904	32–17–6	70
56	February 13	Nashville	5–0	Florida		Luongo	13,019	32–18–6	70
57	February 15	Pittsburgh	1–2	Florida	SO	Montoya	15,595	33–18–6	72
58	February 18	San Jose	2–1	Florida	SO	Montoya	13,019	33–18–7	73
59	February 20	Winnipeg	1–3	Florida		Luongo	16,210	34–18–7	75
60	February 25	Arizona	2–3	Florida		Luongo	13,134	35–18–7	77
61	February 27	Florida	3–4	Columbus	SO	Luongo	15,400	35–18–8	78
62	February 28	Florida	1–3	Minnesota		Luongo	19,093	35–19–8	78

March: 8–6–1 (Home: 3–2–1; Road: 5–4–0)
#	Date	Visitor	Score	Home	OT	Decision	Attendance	Record	Pts	Recap
63	March 1	Florida	3–2	Winnipeg		Luongo	15,294	36–19–8	80
64	March 3	Florida	2–3	Colorado		Luongo	16,194	36–20–8	80
65	March 5	Florida	1–5	Arizona		Montoya	12,361	36–21–8	80
66	March 7	Boston	5–4	Florida	OT	Montoya	19,194	36–21–9	81
67	March 10	Ottawa	2–6	Florida		Luongo	15,051	37–21–9	83
68	March 12	Philadelphia	4–5	Florida	SO	Luongo	19,404	38–21–9	85
69	March 14	Florida	2–3	NY Islanders		Luongo	14,106	38–22–9	85
70	March 15	Florida	4–1	Montreal		Montoya	21,288	39–22–9	87
71	March 17	Florida	4–1	Toronto		Luongo	18,922	40–22–9	89
72	March 19	Detroit	5–3	Florida		Luongo	20,817	40–23–9	89
73	March 21	Florida	2–4	NY Rangers		Montoya	18,006	40–24–9	89
74	March 24	Florida	4–1	Boston		Luongo	17,565	41–24–9	91
75	March 26	Florida	5–2	Tampa Bay		Luongo	19,092	42–24–9	93
76	March 29	Toronto	5–2	Florida		Luongo	16,724	42–25–9	93
77	March 31	New Jersey	2–3	Florida		Montoya	15,803	43–25–9	95

April: 4–1–0 (Home: 2–0–0; Road: 2–1–0)
#	Date	Visitor	Score	Home	OT	Decision	Attendance	Record	Pts	Recap
78	April 2	Montreal	3–4	Florida		Luongo	17,427	44–25–9	97
79	April 4	Florida	4–3	Toronto		Montoya	18,846	45–25–9	99
80	April 5	Florida	4–1	Montreal		Luongo	21,288	46–25–9	101
81	April 7	Florida	1–3	Ottawa		Montoya	19,165	46–26–9	101
82	April 9	Carolina	2–5	Florida		Luongo	18,434	47–26–9	103

Legend: Win (2 points) Loss (0 points) Overtime/shootout loss (1 point)

=== Playoffs ===
2016 Stanley Cup playoffs

Eastern Conference First Round vs. (WC) New York Islanders: New York won 4–2
#	Date	Visitor	Score	Home	OT	Decision	Attendance	Series	Recap
1	April 14	NY Islanders	5–4	Florida		Luongo	17,422	0–1
2	April 15	NY Islanders	1–3	Florida		Luongo	18,373	1–1
3	April 17	Florida	3–4	NY Islanders	OT	Luongo	15,795	1–2
4	April 20	Florida	2–1	NY Islanders		Luongo	15,795	2–2
5	April 22	NY Islanders	2–1	Florida	2OT	Luongo	20,247	2–3
6	April 24	Florida	1–2	NY Islanders	2OT	Luongo	15,795	2–4

Legend: Win Loss

== Player stats ==
Final stats

=== Skaters ===
Regular season
Player	GP	G	A	Pts	+/−	PIM
Jaromir Jagr	79	27	39	66	23	48
Jussi Jokinen	81	18	42	60	25	42
Aleksander Barkov	66	28	31	59	18	8
Jonathan Huberdeau	76	20	39	59	17	43
Vincent Trocheck	76	25	28	53	15	44
Reilly Smith	82	25	25	50	19	31
Aaron Ekblad	78	15	21	36	18	41
Nick Bjugstad	67	15	19	34	−8	41
Brian Campbell	82	6	25	31	31	26
Brandon Pirri^{‡}	52	11	13	24	−4	30
Alex Petrovic	66	2	15	17	17	90
Dmitri Kulikov	74	1	16	17	8	51
Derek MacKenzie	64	6	7	13	7	36
Jiri Hudler^{†}	19	6	5	11	0	10
Quinton Howden	58	6	5	11	−1	18
Teddy Purcell^{†}	15	3	8	11	−2	2
Erik Gudbranson	64	2	7	9	3	49
Logan Shaw	53	5	2	7	−7	13
Corban Knight	20	2	5	7	3	4
Willie Mitchell	46	1	6	7	−2	18
Rocco Grimaldi	20	3	2	5	−4	2
Shawn Thornton	50	1	4	5	−2	80
Dave Bolland	25	1	4	5	−2	16
Connor Brickley	23	1	4	5	1	14
Steven Kampfer	47	0	4	4	5	26
Greg McKegg	15	2	0	2	1	2
Jakub Kindl^{†}	19	0	2	2	10	4
Dylan Olsen	8	0	1	1	−1	2
Michael Matheson	3	0	0	0	1	2
John McFarland	3	0	0	0	−1	0
Kyle Rau	9	0	0	0	−1	2
Brent Regner	7	0	0	0	−2	4
Garrett Wilson	29	0	0	0	−3	24

Playoffs
Player	GP	G	A	Pts	+/−	PIM
Reilly Smith	6	4	4	8	7	0
Nick Bjugstad	5	2	2	4	6	2
Jussi Jokinen	6	1	3	4	5	4
Dmitri Kulikov	6	1	3	4	4	4
Alex Petrovic	6	1	3	4	5	4
Aleksander Barkov	6	2	1	3	−2	2
Jonathan Huberdeau	6	1	2	3	1	10
Teddy Purcell	6	2	0	2	−3	0
Jaromir Jagr	6	0	2	2	−2	4
Brian Campbell	6	0	1	1	−3	0
Derek MacKenzie	6	0	1	1	−1	4
Jiri Hudler	6	0	1	1	−2	4
Garrett Wilson	6	0	1	1	−1	4
Vincent Trocheck	2	0	1	1	1	0
Michael Matheson	5	0	1	1	1	0
Aaron Ekblad	6	0	1	1	0	0
Shawn Thornton	4	0	0	0	0	2
Jakub Kindl	1	0	0	0	−1	0
Greg McKegg	1	0	0	0	0	2
Erik Gudbranson	6	0	0	0	−2	2
Logan Shaw	3	0	0	0	−2	0
Rocco Grimaldi	2	0	0	0	−1	2

=== Goaltenders ===
Regular season
Player	GP	GS	TOI	W	L	OT	GA	GAA	SA	SV%	SO	G	A	PIM
Roberto Luongo	62	60	3602:51	35	19	6	141	2.35	1801	.922	4	0	2	4
Al Montoya	25	22	1351:15	12	7	3	49	2.18	608	.919	0	0	0	2

Playoffs
Player	GP	GS	TOI	W	L	GA	GAA	SA	SV%	SO	G	A	PIM
Roberto Luongo	6	6	438	2	4	15	2.05	227	.934	0	0	0	0

^{†}Denotes player spent time with another team before joining the Panthers. Stats reflect time with the Panthers only.
^{‡}Denotes player was traded mid-season. Stats reflect time with the Panthers only.
Bold/italics denotes franchise record.

== Awards and honours ==
=== Awards ===
Regular season
Player	Award	Awarded
J. Jagr	NHL All-Star game captain	January 2, 2016
A. Ekblad	NHL All-Star game selection	January 6, 2016
R. Luongo	NHL All-Star game selection	January 6, 2016
V. Trocheck	NHL Third Star of the Week	February 8, 2016

=== Milestones ===
Regular season
Player	Milestone	Reached
C. Brickley	1st Career NHL Game	October 10, 2015
C. Brickley	1st Career NHL Goal; 1st Career NHL Point	October 13, 2015
D. MacKenzie	400th Career NHL Game	October 31, 2015
A. Ekblad	100th Career NHL Game	November 19, 2015
V. Trocheck	100th Career NHL Game	December 12, 2015

== Transactions ==
The Panthers were involved in the following transactions during the 2015–16 season:

=== Trades ===
Date	Details		Ref
June 27, 2015	To New York Islanders MTL's 5th-round pick in 2015	To Florida Panthers 5th-round pick in 2016
July 1, 2015	To Boston Bruins Jimmy Hayes (rights)	To Florida Panthers Reilly Smith; Marc Savard
February 27, 2016	To Calgary Flames 2nd-round pick in 2016; 4th-round pick in 2018	To Florida Panthers Jiri Hudler
February 27, 2016	To Edmonton Oilers conditional 3rd-round pick in 2016	To Florida Panthers Teddy Purcell
February 27, 2016	To Detroit Red Wings 6th-round pick in 2017	To Florida Panthers Jakub Kindl^{Note 1}
February 29, 2016	To Anaheim Ducks Brandon Pirri	To Florida Panthers 6th-round pick in 2016
May 25, 2016	To Vancouver Canucks Erik Gudbranson; NYI's 5th-round pick in 2016	To Florida Panthers Jared McCann; 2nd-round pick in 2016; 4th-round pick in 2016
June 10, 2016	To New Jersey Devils Marc Savard; 2nd-round pick in 2018	To Florida Panthers Paul Thompson; Graham Black
June 20, 2016	To New York Rangers 6th-round pick in 2016; Conditional 4th-round pick in 2017^{Note 2}	To Florida Panthers Keith Yandle (negotiating rights)
June 23, 2016	To Colorado Avalanche Rocco Grimaldi	To Florida Panthers Reto Berra

Notes

- ^{Note 1} Detroit to retain 15% ($720,000) of salary as part of trade.
- ^{Note 2} Conditional on Yandle signing with Panthers.

=== Free agents acquired ===
Date	Player	Former team	Contract terms (in U.S. dollars)	Ref
July 1, 2015	Mike McKenna	Arizona Coyotes	2 years, $1.15 million	
July 1, 2015	Shane Harper	Chicago Wolves	1 year, $575,000	
July 1, 2015	Sena Acolatse	Adirondack Flames	1 year, $575,000	
July 1, 2015	Cameron Gaunce	Texas Stars	1 year, $575,000	
July 1, 2015	Brent Regner	Chicago Wolves	2 years, $1.2 million	
July 2, 2015	Rob Flick	Providence Bruins	1 year, $575,000	
March 2, 2016	Dryden Hunt	Moose Jaw Warriors	entry-level contract	
May 3, 2016	Linus Hultstrom	Djurgardens IF	entry-level contract	

=== Free agents lost ===
Date	Player	New team	Contract terms (in U.S. dollars)	Ref
July 4, 2015	Dan Ellis	Washington Capitals	1 year, $650,000	
July 16, 2015	Shane O'Brien	Anaheim Ducks	1 year, $600,000	
October 5, 2015	Scottie Upshall	St. Louis Blues	1 year, $700,000	
September 27, 2015	Brad Boyes	Toronto Maple Leafs	1 year, $700,000	

=== Claimed via waivers ===
Player	Former team	Date claimed off waivers	Ref

=== Lost via waivers ===
Player	New team	Date claimed off waivers	Ref

=== Lost via retirement ===
Player	Ref

=== Player signings ===
Date	Player	Contract terms (in U.S. dollars)	Ref
July 8, 2015	Corban Knight	1 year, $750,000	
July 8, 2015	Garrett Wilson	1 year, $675,000	
July 8, 2015	Greg McKegg	1 year, $700,000	
July 15, 2015	Lawson Crouse	3 years, entry-level contract	
July 15, 2015	Alex Petrovic	2 years, $2.1 million	
July 15, 2015	Quinton Howden	1 year, $850,500	
July 15, 2015	John McFarland	1 year, $850,500	
September 17, 2015	Jonathan Huberdeau	2 years, $6.5 million	
January 26, 2016	Aleksander Barkov	6 years, $35.4 million contract extension	
February 25, 2016	Shawn Thornton	1 year, contract extension	
March 1, 2016	Jayce Hawryluk	entry-level contract	
March 29, 2016	Michael Downing	entry-level contract	
April 15, 2016	Juho Lammikko	3 years, entry-level contract	
May 5, 2016	Jaromir Jagr	1 year, $4 million	
May 9, 2016	Erik Gudbranson	1 year, $3.5 million	
May 10, 2016	Sam Montembeault	3 years, entry-level contract	
May 11, 2016	Shane Harper	1 year	

== Draft picks ==
Below are the Florida Panthers' selections at the 2015 NHL entry draft, held on June 26–27, 2015 at the BB&T Center in Sunrise, Florida.

Round	#	Player	Pos	Nationality	College/Junior/Club team (League)
1	11	Lawson Crouse	LW	Canada	Kingston Frontenacs (OHL)
3	77^{[a]}	Sam montembeault	G	Canada	Blainville-Boisbriand Armada (QMJHL)
3	88^{[b]}	Thomas Schemitsch	D	Canada	Owen Sound Attack (OHL)
4	102	Denis Malgin	C	Switzerland	ZSC Lions (NLA)
5	132	Karch Bachman	LW	United States	Culver Academy (HS-Indiana)
6	162	Christopher Wilkie	RW	United States	Tri-City Storm (USHL)
7	192	Patrick Shea	C	United States	Kimball Union Academy Wildcats (HS-New Hampshire)
7	206^{[c]}	Ryan Bednard	G	United States	Johnstown Tomahawks (NAHL)

Draft notes

- The Florida Panthers' second-round pick went to the New York Rangers as the result of a trade on June 27, 2015, that sent Carl Hagelin and a second and sixth-round pick in 2015 (59th and 179th overall) to Anaheim in exchange for Emerson Etem and this pick.
  Anaheim previously acquired this pick as the result of a trade on June 26, 2015, that sent Kyle Palmieri to New Jersey in exchange for a third-round pick in 2016 and this pick.
  New Jersey previously acquired this pick as the result of a trade on February 26, 2015, that sent Jaromir Jagr to Florida in exchange for a conditional third-round pick in 2016 and this pick.
- The Florida Panthers' third-round pick went to the Tampa Bay Lightning as the result of a trade on June 26, 2015, that sent the Rangers' first-round pick in 2015 (28th overall) to the New York Islanders in exchange for Edmonton's second-round pick in 2015 (33rd overall) and this pick.
  The Islanders previously acquired this pick as the result of a trade on June 28, 2014, that sent a third-round pick in 2014 to Florida in exchange for this pick.
- ^{a} The Pittsburgh Penguins' third-round pick went to the Florida Panthers as the result of a trade on March 5, 2014, that sent Marcel Goc to Pittsburgh in exchange for a fifth-round pick in 2014 and this pick.
- ^{b} The Anaheim Ducks' third-round pick went to the Florida Panthers as the result of a trade on February 28, 2015, that sent Tomas Fleischmann to Anaheim in exchange for Dany Heatley and this pick.
- ^{c} The St. Louis Blues' seventh-round pick went to the Florida Panthers as the result of a trade on September 28, 2013, that sent Scott Timmins and a sixth-round pick in 2014 to New Jersey in exchange for Krys Barch and this pick.
  New Jersey previously acquired this pick as the result of a trade on March 22, 2013, that sent a conditional fourth-round pick to St. Louis in exchange for Matt D'Agostini and this pick.
