= Chris Brown (ice hockey) =

American ice hockey player (born 1991)

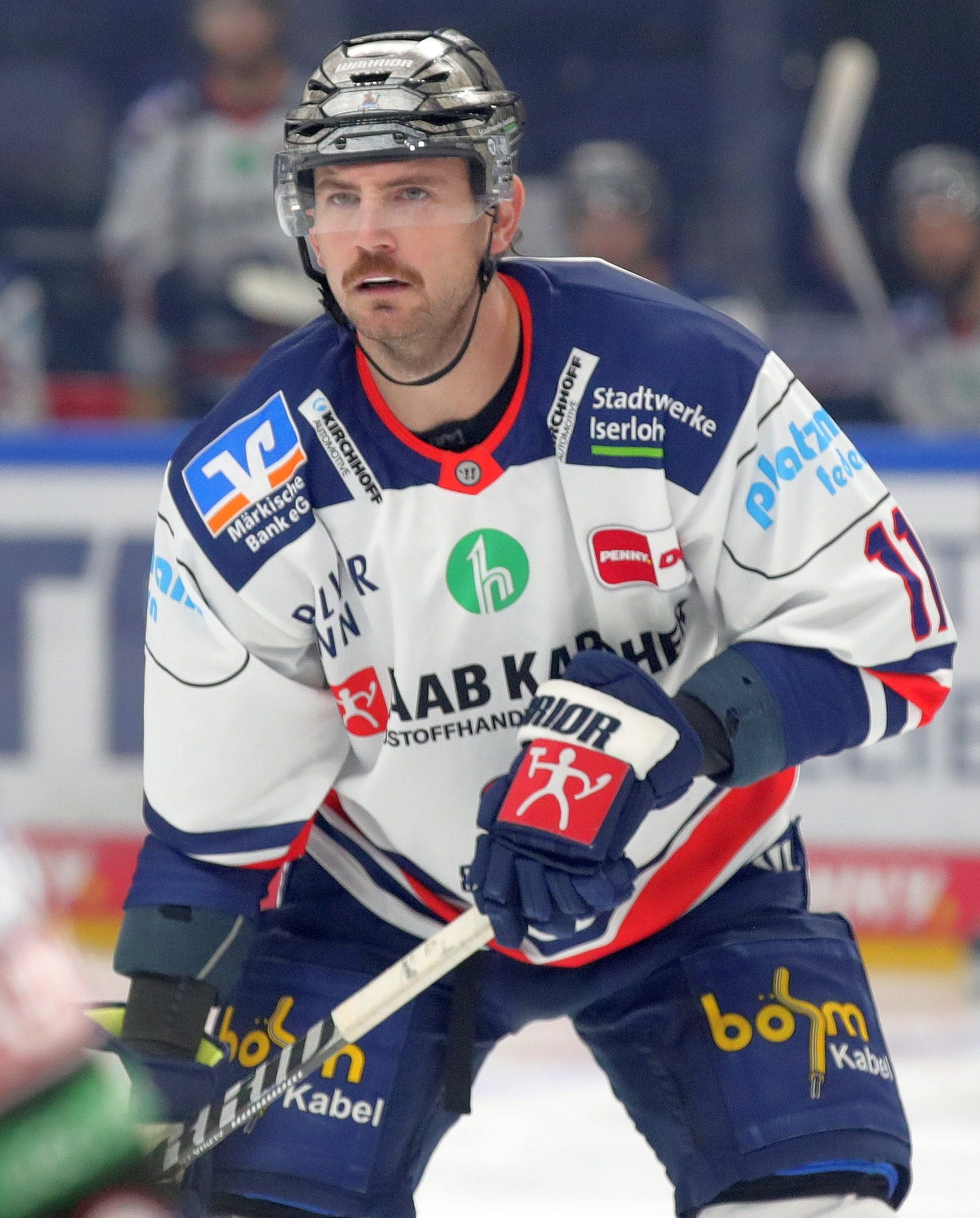
- Chris Brown, 2022
- Born: February 3, 1991 (age 35) Flower Mound, Texas, U.S.
- Height: 6 ft 3 in (191 cm)
- Weight: 200 lb (91 kg; 14 st 4 lb)
- Position: Center
- Shot: Right
- Played for: Phoenix Coyotes; Washington Capitals; Iserlohn Roosters; Nürnberg Ice Tigers; HC Slovan Bratislava; Schwenninger Wild Wings; Fehérvár AV19
- NHL draft: 36th overall, 2009; Phoenix Coyotes
- Playing career: 2012–2025

Christopher James Brown (born February 3, 1991) is an American former professional ice hockey center. He played in the National Hockey League for the Phoenix Coyotes and Washington Capitals.

Brown was drafted by Phoenix in the second round (36th overall) of the 2009 NHL entry draft.

== Playing career ==
As a youth, Brown played in the 2003 Quebec International Pee-Wee Hockey Tournament with the Dallas Storm minor ice hockey team. He grew up in Flower Mound, Texas, where he played hockey and football for Flower Mound High School. He eventually joined the U.S. National Team Development Program from which he then accepted a scholarship to play college hockey with the University of Michigan Wolverines of the Central Collegiate Hockey Association (CCHA). In his first season with the Wolverines, he was selected to the 2009–10 CCHA All-Rookie Team.

On the eve of the 2013–14 NHL trade deadline, Brown was dealt by the Coyotes along with Rostislav Klesla and a fourth-round pick in 2015 NHL entry draft to the Washington Capitals in exchange for Martin Erat and John Mitchell on March 4, 2014. Brown scored his first NHL goal with the Capitals on March 22, 2014, against Antti Niemi of the San Jose Sharks.

Brown was dealt once again on the eve of the 2015–16 trade deadline. He was traded by the Capitals to the New York Rangers in exchange for fellow American Ryan Bourque. On April 20, 2016, Brown was recalled by the New York Rangers from the team's AHL affiliate, the Hartford Wolf Pack.

After parts of two seasons with the Wolf Pack, Brown left North America at the conclusion of his contract with the Rangers, signing a one-year deal with German outfit, the Iserlohn Roosters of the DEL on July 19, 2017. In the 2017–18 season, Brown was looked upon to add production and posted 21 assists and 30 points in 47 games.

On May 8, 2018, Brown signed as a free agent with fellow DEL club, the Thomas Sabo Ice Tigers, on a two-year contract.

Following four seasons with the Ice Tigers, Brown returned as a free agent to his original German club, Iserlohn Roosters, signing a one-year contract on June 22, 2022. In his second stint with the Roosters in 2022–23, Brown notched 22 points through 50 regular season games. With Iserlohn missing the playoffs for the second consecutive season, he left the club at the conclusion of his contract on March 10, 2023.

Brown played his final full season in 2024–25, for Hungarian club Fehérvár AV19 in the multi-state ICE Hockey League, recording 37 points in 55 regular-season and playoff games. After the team was eliminated in the quarterfinals, Brown announced his retirement.

== Career statistics ==
=== Regular season and playoffs ===
			Regular season					Playoffs
Season	Team	League	GP	G	A	Pts	PIM	GP	G	A	Pts	PIM
2007–08	U.S. National Development Team	NAHL	43	8	6	14	66	—	—	—	—	—
2008–09	U.S. National Development Team	NAHL	77	26	20	46	157	—	—	—	—	—
2009–10	University of Michigan	CCHA	45	13	15	28	58	—	—	—	—	—
2010–11	University of Michigan	CCHA	42	9	14	23	59	—	—	—	—	—
2011–12	University of Michigan	CCHA	38	12	17	29	66	—	—	—	—	—
2012–13	Portland Pirates	AHL	68	29	18	47	98	3	1	1	2	6
2012–13	Phoenix Coyotes	NHL	5	0	0	0	2	—	—	—	—	—
2013–14	Phoenix Coyotes	NHL	6	0	0	0	17	—	—	—	—	—
2013–14	Portland Pirates	AHL	51	14	21	35	68	—	—	—	—	—
2013–14	Washington Capitals	NHL	6	1	1	2	0	—	—	—	—	—
2013–14	Hershey Bears	AHL	12	2	3	5	2	—	—	—	—	—
2014–15	Washington Capitals	NHL	5	1	0	1	2	—	—	—	—	—
2014–15	Hershey Bears	AHL	64	17	11	28	70	9	3	2	5	10
2015–16	Hershey Bears	AHL	20	3	6	9	20	—	—	—	—	—
2015–16	Washington Capitals	NHL	1	0	0	0	0	—	—	—	—	—
2015–16	Hartford Wolf Pack	AHL	20	3	6	9	20	—	—	—	—	—
2016–17	Hartford Wolf Pack	AHL	64	14	13	27	78	—	—	—	—	—
2017–18	Iserlohn Roosters	DEL	49	9	21	30	46	2	0	3	3	4
2018–19	Thomas Sabo Ice Tigers	DEL	37	13	12	25	50	8	4	3	7	14
2019–20	Thomas Sabo Ice Tigers	DEL	51	13	22	35	46	—	—	—	—	—
2020–21	Nürnberg Ice Tigers	DEL	30	8	10	18	56	—	—	—	—	—
2021–22	Nürnberg Ice Tigers	DEL	44	11	23	34	59	3	0	0	0	27
2022–23	Iserlohn Roosters	DEL	50	9	13	22	42	—	—	—	—	—
2023–24	HC Slovan Bratislava	Slovak	24	14	6	20	94	—	—	—	—	—
2023–24	Schwenninger Wild Wings	DEL	24	9	7	16	9	7	2	2	4	4
2024–25	Fehérvár AV19	ICEHL	48	21	12	33	41	7	2	2	4	0
2025–26	Tahoe Knight Monsters	ECHL	2	0	0	0	0	—	—	—	—	—
NHL totals			23	2	1	3	21	—	—	—	—	—

Medal record

Representing (United States) USA

Ice hockey

World Junior Championships
Bronze medal – third place	2011 USA	

=== International ===
Year	Team	Event	Result	GP	G	A	Pts	PIM
2008	United States	U17	2nd place, silver medalist(s)	6	2	1	3	10
2009	United States	U18	1st place, gold medalist(s)	7	4	3	7	8
2011	United States	WJC	3rd place, bronze medalist(s)	6	2	1	3	4
Junior totals				19	8	5	13	22

== Awards and honors ==
Award	Year
College
All-CCHA Rookie Team	2009–10
