= 2015–16 Philadelphia Flyers season =

NHL hockey team season

2015–16 Philadelphia Flyers
- Division: 5th Metropolitan
- Conference: 7th Eastern
- 2015–16 record: 41–27–14
- Home record: 23–10–8
- Road record: 18–17–6
- Goals for: 214
- Goals against: 218

Team information
- General manager: Ron Hextall
- Coach: Dave Hakstol
- Captain: Claude Giroux
- Alternate captains: Wayne Simmonds; Mark Streit
- Arena: Wells Fargo Center
- Average attendance: 19,277 (98.4%)
- Minor league affiliates: Lehigh Valley Phantoms; Reading Royals

Team leaders
- Goals: Wayne Simmonds (32)
- Assists: Claude Giroux (45)
- Points: Claude Giroux (67)
- Penalty minutes: Wayne Simmonds (147)
- Plus/minus: Andrew MacDonald (+10)
- Wins: Steve Mason (23)
- Goals against average: Michal Neuvirth (2.27)

The 2015–16 Philadelphia Flyers season was the 49th season for the National Hockey League (NHL) franchise that was established on June 5, 1967. The Flyers opened the regular season on October 8, 2015 against the Tampa Bay Lightning. This was the first season under new head coach Dave Hakstol. The Flyers finished fifth in the Metropolitan Division and seventh in the Eastern Conference, qualifying for the Stanley Cup Playoffs as the second Wild Card team in the Eastern Conference, where they would lose in the first round in six games to the Washington Capitals.

== Off-season ==
After the Flyers failed to qualify for the playoffs for the second time in three seasons in 2014–15, head coach Craig Berube was fired. On May 18, 2015, the Flyers hired Dave Hakstol to replace Berube. Hakstol had been the University of North Dakota's head coach for the past 11 seasons, during which he had a 289–143–43 record and led the school to the NCAA tournament in each season and advanced to the Frozen Four seven times. The Flyers retained assistant coaches Ian Laperriere, Joe Mullen and Gord Murphy. Kim Dillabaugh was named goaltending coach on July 3, 2015, replacing Jeff Reese.

The Flyers signed Kontinental Hockey League defenseman Evgeny Medvedev to a one-year, $3 million contract on May 20. June 27, the first day of the draft, was a busy one for the Flyers, as they selected defenseman Ivan Provorov with the seventh overall pick while also trading the 29th and 61st overall selection for the 24th in order to select forward Travis Konecny. The next day, the Flyers made a trade to create some cap space, with the Arizona Coyotes receiving Nicklas Grossmann and acquiring the contract of Chris Pronger, while the Flyers received Sam Gagner and a conditional 2016 or 2017 draft pick. The Flyers then traded Zac Rinaldo to the Boston Bruins in exchange for a 2017 third-round pick on June 29, while re-signing Chris VandeVelde to a two-year deal. The next day, the Flyers re-signed Ryan White to a one-year deal. On July 1, the Flyers signed free-agent goaltender Michal Neuvirth to a two-year, $3.25 million contract.

== Standings ==
Metropolitan Division
Pos	Team	GP	W	L	OTL	ROW	GF	GA	GD	Pts
1	p – Washington Capitals	82	56	18	8	52	252	193	+59	120
2	x – Pittsburgh Penguins	82	48	26	8	44	245	203	+42	104
3	x – New York Rangers	82	46	27	9	43	236	217	+19	101
4	x – New York Islanders	82	45	27	10	40	232	216	+16	100
5	x – Philadelphia Flyers	82	41	27	14	38	214	218	−4	96
6	Carolina Hurricanes	82	35	31	16	33	198	226	−28	86
7	New Jersey Devils	82	38	36	8	36	184	208	−24	84
8	Columbus Blue Jackets	82	34	40	8	28	219	252	−33	76

Source: National Hockey League
p – Clinched Presidents' Trophy; x – Clinched playoff spot

Eastern Conference Wild Card
Pos	Div	Team	GP	W	L	OTL	ROW	GF	GA	GD	Pts
1	ME	x – New York Islanders	82	45	27	10	40	232	216	+16	100
2	ME	x – Philadelphia Flyers	82	41	27	14	38	214	218	−4	96
3	AT	Boston Bruins	82	42	31	9	38	240	230	+10	93
4	ME	Carolina Hurricanes	82	35	31	16	33	198	226	−28	86
5	AT	Ottawa Senators	82	38	35	9	32	236	247	−11	85
6	ME	New Jersey Devils	82	38	36	8	36	184	208	−24	84
7	AT	Montreal Canadiens	82	38	38	6	33	221	236	−15	82
8	AT	Buffalo Sabres	82	35	36	11	33	201	222	−21	81
9	ME	Columbus Blue Jackets	82	34	40	8	28	219	252	−33	76
10	AT	Toronto Maple Leafs	82	29	42	11	23	198	246	−48	69

Source: National Hockey League
x – Clinched playoff spot

== Schedule and results ==
=== Preseason ===
2015 preseason
Preseason: 3–2–2 (home: 3–1–0; road: 0–1–2)

Game	Date	Visitor	Score	Home	OT	Decision	Attendance	Record	Recap
1^{[a]}	September 21	NY Islanders	3–5	Philadelphia^{[b]}		Neuvirth	––	1–0–0	W
2^{[a]}	September 21	Philadelphia	2–3	NY Islanders		Stolarz	5,366	1–1–0	L
3	September 22	NY Rangers	3–5	Philadelphia		Mason	16,985	2–1–0	W
4	September 25	NY Islanders	2–5	Philadelphia		Mason	17,369	3–1–0	W
5	September 28	Philadelphia	2–3	NY Rangers	OT	Mason	18,006	3–1–1	OTL
6	September 30	New Jersey	4–2	Philadelphia		Neuvirth	17,732	3–2–1	L
7	October 2	Philadelphia	2–3	New Jersey	SO	Mason	9,235	3–2–2	OTL
Notes:^{a} – Indicates split-squad game.^{b} – Game was played at PPL Center in Allentown, Pennsylvania.

Legend: W Win (2 points) L Loss (0 points) OTL Overtime/shootout loss (1 point)

=== Regular season ===
2015–16 regular season
October: 4–4–2 (home: 3–2–1; road: 1–2–1)

Game	Date	Visitor	Score	Home	OT	Decision	Attendance	Record	Points	Recap
1	October 8	Philadelphia	2–3	Tampa Bay	OT	Mason	19,092	0–0–1	1	OTL
2	October 10	Philadelphia	1–7	Florida		Mason	19,434	0–1–1	1	L
3	October 12	Florida	0–1	Philadelphia		Neuvirth	19,769	1–1–1	3	W
4	October 14	Chicago	0–3	Philadelphia		Neuvirth	19,779	2–1–1	5	W
5	October 20	Dallas	2–1	Philadelphia		Mason	19,077	2–2–1	5	L
6	October 21	Philadelphia	5–4	Boston	OT	Mason	17,565	3–2–1	7	W
7	October 24	NY Rangers	2–3	Philadelphia	SO	Mason	19,805	4–2–1	9	W
8	October 27	Buffalo	4–3	Philadelphia	OT	Mason	19,432	4–2–2	10	OTL
9	October 29	New Jersey	4–1	Philadelphia		Mason	19,241	4–3–2	10	L
10	October 30	Philadelphia	1–3	Buffalo		Neuvirth	15,962	4–4–2	10	L

November: 5–6–3 (home: 2–2–2; road: 3–4–1)

Game	Date	Visitor	Score	Home	OT	Decision	Attendance	Record	Points	Recap
11	November 2	Philadelphia	1–4	Vancouver		Mason	18,264	4–5–2	10	L
12	November 3	Philadelphia	2–4	Edmonton		Neuvirth	16,839	4–6–2	10	L
13	November 5	Philadelphia	1–2	Calgary	OT	Neuvirth	19,289	4–6–3	11	OTL
14	November 7	Philadelphia	3–0	Winnipeg		Neuvirth	15,294	5–6–3	13	W
15	November 10	Colorado	4–0	Philadelphia		Neuvirth	18,587	5–7–3	13	L
16	November 12	Washington	5–2	Philadelphia		Mason	19,414	5–8–3	13	L
17	November 14	Philadelphia	3–2	Carolina	OT	Mason	13,758	6–8–3	15	W
18	November 17	Los Angeles	3–2	Philadelphia	SO	Mason	18,846	6–8–4	16	OTL
19	November 19	San Jose	1–0	Philadelphia	OT	Mason	18,229	6–8–5	17	OTL
20	November 21	Philadelphia	0–4	Ottawa		Mason	18,578	6–9–5	17	L
21	November 23	Carolina	2–3	Philadelphia	OT	Neuvirth	18,636	7–9–5	19	W
22	November 25	Philadelphia	1–3	NY Islanders		Mason	13,027	7–10–5	19	L
23	November 27	Nashville	2–3	Philadelphia	OT	Neuvirth	19,818	8–10–5	21	W
24	November 28	Philadelphia	3–0	NY Rangers		Mason	18,006	9–10–5	23	W

December: 6–4–2 (home: 3–1–1; road: 3–3–1)

Game	Date	Visitor	Score	Home	OT	Decision	Attendance	Record	Points	Recap
25	December 1	Philadelphia	4–2	Ottawa		Mason	17,010	10–10–5	25	W
26	December 4	Philadelphia	4–3	New Jersey	OT	Neuvirth	14,825	11–10–5	27	W
27	December 5	Columbus	4–1	Philadelphia		Mason	18,202	11–11–5	27	L
28	December 8	NY Islanders	4–3	Philadelphia	SO	Neuvirth	18,108	11–11–6	28	OTL
29	December 10	Philadelphia	4–2	St. Louis		Neuvirth	14,428	12–11–6	30	W
30	December 11	Philadelphia	1–3	Dallas		Neuvirth	18,532	12–12–6	30	L
31	December 15	Carolina	3–4	Philadelphia	OT	Neuvirth	18,205	13–12–6	32	W
32	December 17	Vancouver	0–2	Philadelphia		Mason	17,943	14–12–6	34	W
33	December 19	Philadelphia	2–3	Columbus	SO	Mason	14,030	14–12–7	35	OTL
34	December 21	St. Louis	3–4	Philadelphia		Mason	19,676	15–12–7	37	W
35	December 27	Philadelphia	2–4	Anaheim		Mason	17,322	15–13–7	37	L
36	December 30	Philadelphia	2–4	San Jose		Mason	17,562	15–14–7	37	L

January: 6–4–1 (home: 3–2–1; road: 3–2–0)

Game	Date	Visitor	Score	Home	OT	Decision	Attendance	Record	Points	Recap
37	January 2	Philadelphia	1–2	Los Angeles		Neuvirth	18,230	15–15–7	37	L
38	January 5	Montreal	3–4	Philadelphia		Neuvirth	19,163	16–15–7	39	W
39	January 7	Philadelphia	4–3	Minnesota	OT	Mason	19,125	17–15–7	41	W
40	January 9	NY Islanders	0–4	Philadelphia		Mason	19,874	18–15–7	43	W
41	January 13	Boston	2–3	Philadelphia		Mason	19,704	19–15–7	45	W
42	January 16	NY Rangers	3–2	Philadelphia	SO	Mason	19,843	19–15–8	46	OTL
43	January 17	Philadelphia	2–1	Detroit	SO	Neuvirth	20,027	20–15–8	48	W
44	January 19	Toronto	3–2	Philadelphia		Mason	19,319	20–16–8	48	L
45	January 21	Philadelphia	3–4	Pittsburgh		Mason	18,652	20–17–8	48	L
–	January 23	Philadelphia		NY Islanders	Game rescheduled to April 10 due to hazardous weather.					
46	January 25	Boston	3–2	Philadelphia		Neuvirth	19,738	20–18–8	48	L
47	January 27	Philadelphia	4–3	Washington	OT	Neuvirth	18,506	21–18–8	50	W

February: 8–4–3 (home: 5–1–2; road: 3–3–1)

Game	Date	Visitor	Score	Home	OT	Decision	Attendance	Record	Points	Recap
48	February 2	Montreal	2–4	Philadelphia		Mason	19,031	22–18–8	52	W
49	February 4	Philadelphia	6–3	Nashville		Mason	17,113	23–18–8	54	W
50	February 6	NY Rangers	3–2	Philadelphia	SO	Mason	19,819	23–18–9	55	OTL
51	February 7	Philadelphia	2–3	Washington		Mason	18,506	23–19–9	55	L
52	February 9	Anaheim	4–1	Philadelphia		Mason	18,717	23–20–9	55	L
53	February 11	Buffalo	1–5	Philadelphia		Mason	19,019	24–20–9	57	W
54	February 13	New Jersey	2–1	Philadelphia	OT	Neuvirth	19,775	24–20–10	58	OTL
55	February 14	Philadelphia	1–3	NY Rangers		Mason	18,006	24–21–10	58	L
56	February 16	Philadelphia	6–3	New Jersey		Neuvirth	15,482	25–21–10	60	W
57	February 19	Philadelphia	2–3	Montreal	SO	Neuvirth	21,288	25–21–11	61	OTL
58	February 20	Philadelphia	5–4	Toronto	OT	Neuvirth	19,060	26–21–11	63	W
59	February 23	Philadelphia	1–3	Carolina		Neuvirth	10,896	26–22–11	63	L
60	February 25	Minnesota	2–3	Philadelphia		Neuvirth	18,631	27–22–11	65	W
61	February 27	Arizona	2–4	Philadelphia		Neuvirth	19,773	28–22–11	67	W
62	February 29	Calgary	3–5	Philadelphia		Neuvirth	19,065	29–22–11	69	W

March: 9–3–2 (home: 5–2–0; road: 4–1–2)

Game	Date	Visitor	Score	Home	OT	Decision	Attendance	Record	Points	Recap
63	March 3	Edmonton	4–0	Philadelphia		Neuvirth	18,636	29–23–11	69	L
64	March 5	Columbus	0–6	Philadelphia		Mason	19,645	30–23–11	71	W
65	March 7	Tampa Bay	2–4	Philadelphia		Mason	17,906	31–23–11	73	W
66	March 11	Philadelphia	3–1	Tampa Bay		Mason	19,092	32–23–11	75	W
67	March 12	Philadelphia	4–5	Florida	SO	Mason	19,404	32–23–12	76	OTL
68	March 15	Detroit	3–4	Philadelphia		Mason	19,806	33–23–12	78	W
69	March 16	Philadelphia	3–2	Chicago		Neuvirth	22,113	34–23–12	80	W
70	March 19	Pittsburgh	4–1	Philadelphia		Mason	19,967	34–24–12	80	L
71	March 21	Philadelphia	4–1	NY Islanders		Mason	14,329	35–24–12	82	W
72	March 22	Philadelphia	2–3	Columbus	SO	Mason	16,230	35–24–13	83	OTL
73	March 24	Philadelphia	4–2	Colorado		Mason	18,087	36–24–13	85	W
74	March 26	Philadelphia	1–2	Arizona		Mason	16,002	36–25–13	85	L
75	March 28	Winnipeg	2–3	Philadelphia	OT	Mason	19,100	37–25–13	87	W
76	March 30	Washington	1–2	Philadelphia	SO	Mason	19,850	38–25–13	89	W

April: 3–2–1 (home: 2–0–1; road: 1–2–0)

Game	Date	Visitor	Score	Home	OT	Decision	Attendance	Record	Points	Recap
77	April 2	Ottawa	2–3	Philadelphia		Mason	19,578	39–25–13	91	W
78	April 3	Philadelphia	2–6	Pittsburgh		Mason	18,673	39–26–13	91	L
79	April 6	Philadelphia	0–3	Detroit		Mason	20,027	39–27–13	91	L
80	April 7	Toronto	4–3	Philadelphia	OT	Mason	19,674	39–27–14	92	OTL
81	April 9	Pittsburgh	1–3	Philadelphia		Mason	19,919	40–27–14	94	W
82	April 10	Philadelphia	5–2	NY Islanders		Neuvirth	14,244	41–27–14	96	W

Legend: W Win (2 points) L Loss (0 points) OTL Overtime/shootout loss (1 point)

=== Playoffs ===
2016 Stanley Cup playoffs
Eastern Conference First Round vs. (M1) Washington Capitals: Washington wins 4–2

Game	Date	Visitor	Score	Home	OT	Decision	Attendance	Series	Recap
1	April 14	Philadelphia	0–2	Washington		Mason	18,506	0–1	L
2	April 16	Philadelphia	1–4	Washington		Mason	18,506	0–2	L
3	April 18	Washington	6–1	Philadelphia		Mason	19,678	0–3	L
4	April 20	Washington	1–2	Philadelphia		Neuvirth	19,692	1–3	W
5	April 22	Philadelphia	2–0	Washington		Neuvirth	18,506	2–3	W
6	April 24	Washington	1–0	Philadelphia		Neuvirth	19,925	2–4	L

Legend: W Win L Loss

== Player statistics ==
=== Scoring ===
- Position abbreviations: C = Center; D = Defense; G = Goaltender; LW = Left wing; RW = Right wing
- † = Joined team via a transaction (e.g., trade, waivers, signing) during the season. Stats reflect time with the Flyers only.
- ‡ = Left team via a transaction (e.g., trade, waivers, release) during the season. Stats reflect time with the Flyers only.

No.	Player	Pos	Regular season						Playoffs					
No.	Player	Pos	GP	G	A	Pts	+/-	PIM	GP	G	A	Pts	+/-	PIM
28	Claude Giroux	C	78	22	45	67	−8	53	6	0	1	1	−2	2
17	Wayne Simmonds	RW	81	32	28	60	−7	147	6	0	2	2	−1	13
10	Brayden Schenn	C	80	26	33	59	3	33	6	0	2	2	2	7
93	Jakub Voracek	RW	73	11	44	55	−5	38	6	1	0	1	−1	4
53	Shayne Gostisbehere	D	64	17	29	46	8	24	6	1	1	2	0	4
14	Sean Couturier	C	63	11	28	39	8	30	1	0	0	0	0	0
12	Michael Raffl	LW	82	13	18	31	9	30	6	1	0	1	0	2
24	Matt Read	RW	79	11	15	26	−5	27	6	0	0	0	1	2
32	Mark Streit	D	62	6	17	23	−1	18	6	0	1	1	0	6
21	Scott Laughton	C	71	7	14	21	−2	34	3	0	0	0	−1	0
25	Ryan White	C	73	11	5	16	−9	101	6	1	0	1	0	28
89	Sam Gagner	C	53	8	8	16	4	25	6	0	2	2	1	8
78	Pierre-Edouard Bellemare	LW	74	7	7	14	−8	27	5	0	1	1	−1	15
3	Radko Gudas	D	76	5	9	14	−3	116	6	0	0	0	−2	18
76	Chris VandeVelde	C	79	2	12	14	−7	27	6	1	0	1	−1	0
15	Michael Del Zotto	D	52	4	9	13	−8	16	—	—	—	—	—	—
82	Evgeny Medvedev	D	45	4	9	13	5	34	—	—	—	—	—	—
20	R. J. Umberger	C	39	2	9	11	1	15	—	—	—	—	—	—
52	Nick Cousins	C	37	6	4	10	5	4	6	0	0	0	0	2
55	Nick Schultz	D	81	1	9	10	−1	42	6	0	0	0	1	2
47	Andrew MacDonald	D	28	1	7	8	10	6	6	1	0	1	0	2
23	Brandon Manning	D	56	1	6	7	2	66	6	0	1	1	−2	4
22	Luke Schenn‡	D	29	2	3	5	−7	30	—	—	—	—	—	—
36	Colin McDonald	RW	5	1	0	1	0	7	3	0	0	0	0	0
40	Vincent Lecavalier‡	C	7	0	1	1	−1	2	—	—	—	—	—	—
30	Michal Neuvirth	G	32	0	1	1		2	3	0	0	0		0
58	Taylor Leier	LW	6	0	0	0	0	0	—	—	—	—	—	—
35	Steve Mason	G	54	0	0	0		2	3	0	0	0		0
19	Jordan Weal†	C	4	0	0	0	1	0	—	—	—	—	—	—

=== Goaltending ===
No.	Player	Regular season											Playoffs									
No.	Player	GP	GS	W	L	OT	SA	GA	GAA	SV%	SO	TOI	GP	GS	W	L	SA	GA	GAA	SV%	SO	TOI
35	Steve Mason	54	53	23	19	10	1602	132	2.51	.918	4	3150	3	3	0	3	81	12	4.09	.852	0	176
30	Michal Neuvirth	32	29	18	8	4	908	69	2.27	.924	3	1825	3	3	2	1	105	2	0.67	.981	1	178

== Awards and records ==
=== Awards ===
Type	Award/honor	Recipient	Ref
League (annual)	NHL All-Rookie Team	Shayne Gostisbehere (Defense)	
League (in-season)	NHL All-Star Game selection	Claude Giroux	
Team	Barry Ashbee Trophy	Shayne Gostisbehere	
Team	Bobby Clarke Trophy	Claude Giroux	
Team	Gene Hart Memorial Award	Shayne Gostisbehere	
Team	Pelle Lindbergh Memorial Trophy	Brayden Schenn	
Team	Toyota Cup	Claude Giroux	
Team	Yanick Dupre Memorial Class Guy Award	Wayne Simmonds	

=== Records ===
Shayne Gostisbehere set a number of team records during the 2015–16 season. Gostisbehere‘s 15-game point streak from January 19 to February 20 is the team record for a rookie and the NHL record for a rookie defenseman, and his nine-game assist streak from January 21 to February 11 tied the team record for a rookie. He set franchise single season highs for goals by a rookie defenseman (17) and overtime goals (4), and tied the team record for powerplay goals by a defenseman (8).

=== Milestones ===
Milestone	Player	Date	Ref
First game	Evgeny Medvedev	October 8, 2015	
First game	Taylor Leier	November 14, 2015	
1,000th game played	Nick Schultz	January 13, 2016	

== Transactions ==
The Flyers were involved in the following transactions from June 16, 2015, the day after the deciding game of the 2015 Stanley Cup Finals, through June 12, 2016, the day of the deciding game of the 2016 Stanley Cup Finals.

=== Trades ===
Date	Details		Ref
June 26, 2015	To Toronto Maple Leafs: Tampa Bay's 1st-round pick in 2015; Chicago's 2nd-round pick in 2015	To Philadelphia Flyers: Nashville's 1st-round pick in 2015	
June 27, 2015	To Los Angeles Kings: Columbus' 4th-round pick in 2015	To Philadelphia Flyers: 4th-round pick in 2015; 6th-round pick in 2016	
June 27, 2015	To Arizona Coyotes: Nicklas Grossmann (Note: The Flyers retained $500,000 of Grossmann's salary.); Contract of Chris Pronger	To Philadelphia Flyers: Sam Gagner; Conditional draft pick in 2016 or 2017 (Note: The draft pick the Flyers receive will be Arizona's choice of either a 4th-round pick in 2016 or their 3rd-round pick in 2017. Arizona sent the Flyers San Jose's 4th-round pick on June 25, 2016, to complete the trade. Arizona had previously traded their own 4th-round pick and acquired the pick from San Jose on June 20, 2016.)	
June 29, 2015	To Boston Bruins: Zac Rinaldo	To Philadelphia Flyers: 3rd-round pick in 2017	
January 6, 2016	To Los Angeles Kings: Vincent Lecavalier (Note: The Flyers retained half of Lecavalier and Schenn's salaries.); Luke Schenn	To Philadelphia Flyers: Jordan Weal; 3rd-round pick in 2016	

=== Players acquired ===
Date	Player	Former team	Term	Via	Ref
July 1, 2015	Tim Brent	Metallurg Magnitogorsk (KHL)	1-year	Free agency	
July 1, 2015	Chris Conner	Washington Capitals	2-year	Free agency	
July 1, 2015	Davis Drewiske	Montreal Canadiens	1-year	Free agency	
July 1, 2015	Jason LaBarbera	Anaheim Ducks	1-year	Free agency	
July 1, 2015	Michal Neuvirth	New York Islanders	2-year	Free agency	
July 3, 2015	Colin McDonald	New York Islanders	1-year	Free agency	
August 8, 2015	Chris Porter	St. Louis Blues	1-year	Free agency	
September 21, 2015	Philippe Myers	Rouyn-Noranda Huskies (QMJHL)	3-year	Free agency	
April 1, 2016	Ray Emery	Adler Mannheim (DEL)	1-year (Note: Signed for the remainder of the regular season.)	Free agency	
April 5, 2016	Alex Lyon	Yale University (ECAC)	2-year	Free agency	

=== Players lost ===
Date	Player	New team	Via (Note: In parentheses is the player's free agency group on July 1 if applicable.)	Ref
July 1, 2015	Jason Akeson	Buffalo Sabres	Free agency (VI)	
July 1, 2015	Carlo Colaiacovo	Buffalo Sabres	Free agency (III)	
July 1, 2015	Blair Jones	Vancouver Canucks	Free agency (III)	
July 1, 2015	Zack Stortini	Ottawa Senators	Free agency (III)	
July 1, 2015	Rob Zepp (Note: Zepp retired.)		Contract expiration (III)	
July 13, 2015	Oliver Lauridsen	Frolunda HC (SHL)	Free agency (VI)	
August 31, 2015	Jay Rosehill	Lehigh Valley Phantoms (AHL)	Free agency (III)	
September 1, 2015	Andrew Johnston	Missouri Mavericks (ECHL)	Free agency (UFA)	
October 1, 2015	Chris Porter	Minnesota Wild	Waivers	
October 5, 2015	Matt Konan	Tulsa Oilers (ECHL)	Free agency (UFA)	
October 10, 2015	Ray Emery	Ontario Reign (AHL)	Free agency (III)	
May 25, 2016	Tim Brent		Retirement	

=== Signings ===
Date	Player	Term	Contract type	Ref
June 29, 2015	Chris VandeVelde	2-year	Re-signing	
June 30, 2015	Ryan White	1-year	Re-signing	
July 3, 2015	Ivan Provorov	3-year	Entry-level	
July 16, 2015	Michael Del Zotto	2-year	Re-signing	
July 16, 2015	Travis Konecny	3-year	Entry-level	
July 28, 2015	Sean Couturier	6-year	Extension	
July 30, 2015	Jakub Voracek	8-year	Extension	
February 27, 2016	Colin McDonald	2-year	Extension	
February 28, 2016	Michael Raffl	3-year	Extension	
March 21, 2016	Reece Willcox	3-year	Entry-level	

== Draft picks ==
Below are the Philadelphia Flyers' selections made at the 2015 NHL entry draft, held on June 26–27, 2015 at the BB&T Center in Sunrise, Florida. The Flyers original second and third-round picks were traded in two different trades.

Round	Pick	Player	Position	Nationality	Team (league)	Notes
1	7	Ivan Provorov	Defense	Russia	Brandon Wheat Kings (WHL)	
1	24	Travis Konecny	Right wing	Canada	Ottawa 67's (OHL)	(Note: The Flyers acquired 2015 first and third-round picks along with Radko Gudas from the Tampa Bay Lightning for Braydon Coburn on March 2, 2015.)
3	70	Felix Sandstrom	Goaltender	Sweden	Brynas IF (SHL)	(Note: The San Jose Sharks' third-round pick will go the Philadelphia Flyers as the result of a trade on July 2, 2014 that sent Tye McGinn to San Jose in exchange for this pick.)
3	90	Matej Tomek	Goaltender	Slovakia	Topeka RoadRunners (NAHL)	
4	98	Samuel Dove-McFalls	Left wing	Canada	Saint John Sea Dogs (QMJHL)	
4	104	Mikhail Vorobyev	Center	Russia	Tolpar Ufa (MHL)	(Note: The Los Angeles Kings's fourth-round pick will go to the Philadelphia Flyers as the result of a trade on June 27, 2015 that sent the Columbus Blue Jackets' fourth-round pick to Los Angeles for Los Angeles' sixth-round pick in 2016 and this pick. The Flyers originally acquired Columbus' fourth-round pick in a trade which sent Scott Hartnell to Columbus for R. J. Umberger and the pick.)
5	128	David Kase	Right wing	Czech Republic	Pirati Chomutov (Czech 2)	
6	158	Cooper Marody	Center	United States	Sioux Falls Stampede (USHL)	
7	188	Ivan Fedotov	Goaltender	Russia	HC Neftekhimik Nizhnekamsk (KHL)	
