= 2015–16 New York Islanders season =

NHL hockey team season

2015–16 New York Islanders
- Division: 4th Metropolitan
- Conference: 5th Eastern
- 2015–16 record: 45–27–10
- Home record: 25–11–5
- Road record: 20–16–5
- Goals for: 232
- Goals against: 216

Team information
- General manager: Garth Snow
- Coach: Jack Capuano
- Captain: John Tavares
- Alternate captains: Frans Nielsen; Kyle Okposo
- Arena: Barclays Center
- Average attendance: 13,626 (41 games)
- Minor league affiliate: Bridgeport Sound Tigers (AHL) Missouri Mavericks (ECHL)

Team leaders
- Goals: John Tavares (33)
- Assists: Kyle Okposo (42)
- Points: John Tavares (70)
- Penalty minutes: Matt Martin (119)
- Plus/minus: Johnny Boychuk (+17)
- Wins: Thomas Greiss (23)
- Goals against average: Jaroslav Halak (2.30)

The 2015–16 New York Islanders season was the 44th season in the franchise's history. This season was the team's first at Barclays Center in Brooklyn, one of the five boroughs of New York City, which it shares with the Brooklyn Nets of the National Basketball Association (NBA).

The team's regular season began on October 9, 2015, against the Chicago Blackhawks.

The Islanders qualified for the 2016 Stanley Cup playoffs after finishing the season in fourth place in the Metropolitan Division and fifth in the Eastern Conference with 100 points. The playoff berth was the team's third post-season berth in four seasons, having qualified in 2012–13 and 2014–15, but not in 2013–14. The Islanders' first round matchup had them up against the champions of the Atlantic Division, the Florida Panthers. The Islanders won the series in 6 games on a John Tavares goal in double overtime, marking the team's first playoff series victory since 1993. The Islanders' second round matchup had them matched up against the Tampa Bay Lightning, in which they lost the series in 5 games.

== Standings ==
Metropolitan Division
Pos	Team	GP	W	L	OTL	ROW	GF	GA	GD	Pts
1	p – Washington Capitals	82	56	18	8	52	252	193	+59	120
2	x – Pittsburgh Penguins	82	48	26	8	44	245	203	+42	104
3	x – New York Rangers	82	46	27	9	43	236	217	+19	101
4	x – New York Islanders	82	45	27	10	40	232	216	+16	100
5	x – Philadelphia Flyers	82	41	27	14	38	214	218	−4	96
6	Carolina Hurricanes	82	35	31	16	33	198	226	−28	86
7	New Jersey Devils	82	38	36	8	36	184	208	−24	84
8	Columbus Blue Jackets	82	34	40	8	28	219	252	−33	76

Source: National Hockey League
p – Clinched Presidents' Trophy; x – Clinched playoff spot

Eastern Conference Wild Card
Pos	Div	Team	GP	W	L	OTL	ROW	GF	GA	GD	Pts
1	ME	x – New York Islanders	82	45	27	10	40	232	216	+16	100
2	ME	x – Philadelphia Flyers	82	41	27	14	38	214	218	−4	96
3	AT	Boston Bruins	82	42	31	9	38	240	230	+10	93
4	ME	Carolina Hurricanes	82	35	31	16	33	198	226	−28	86
5	AT	Ottawa Senators	82	38	35	9	32	236	247	−11	85
6	ME	New Jersey Devils	82	38	36	8	36	184	208	−24	84
7	AT	Montreal Canadiens	82	38	38	6	33	221	236	−15	82
8	AT	Buffalo Sabres	82	35	36	11	33	201	222	−21	81
9	ME	Columbus Blue Jackets	82	34	40	8	28	219	252	−33	76
10	AT	Toronto Maple Leafs	82	29	42	11	23	198	246	−48	69

Source: National Hockey League
x – Clinched playoff spot

== Schedule and results ==
=== Pre-season ===
2015 preseason game log: 2–6–0 (Home: 2–1–0; Road: 0–5–0)
#	Date	Visitor	Score	Home	OT	Decision	Attendance	Record	Recap
1^{[A]}	September 21	NY Islanders	3–5	Philadelphia^{[B]}		Greiss	––	0–1–0	Recap
2^{[A]}	September 21	Philadelphia	2–3	NY Islanders		Halak	5,366	1–1–0	Recap
3	September 23	New Jersey	1–2	NY Islanders		Poulin	7,046	2–1–0	Recap
4^{[A]}	September 25	NY Islanders	2–5	Philadelphia		Gibson	17,369	2–2–0	Recap
5^{[A]}	September 25	NY Islanders	2–4	New Jersey		Williams	8,871	2–3–0	Recap
6	September 26	NY Islanders	3–5	Carolina^{[C]}		Greiss	––	2–4–0	Recap
7	September 28	Washington	3–1	NY Islanders		Greiss	––	2–5–0	Recap
8	October 4	NY Islanders	2–6	Washington		Williams	16,073	2–6–0	Recap
^{A} – indicates split-squad game.^{B} – game to be played at PPL Center in Allentown, Pennsylvania.^{C} – game to be played at Scotiabank Centre in Halifax, Nova Scotia.

=== Regular season ===
2015–16 game log

October: 6–2–3 (Home: 4–1–2; Road: 2–1–1)
#	Date	Visitor	Score	Home	OT	Decision	Attendance	Record	Pts	Recap
1	October 9	Chicago	3–2	NY Islanders	OT	Greiss	15,795	0–0–1	1	Recap
2	October 10	NY Islanders	1–4	Chicago		Berube	21,392	0–1–1	1	Recap
3	October 12	Winnipeg	2–4	NY Islanders		Greiss	11,183	1–1–1	3	Recap
4	October 15	Nashville	3–4	NY Islanders		Greiss	10,542	2–1–1	5	Recap
5	October 17	San Jose	3–6	NY Islanders		Halak	11,577	3–1–1	7	Recap
6	October 20	NY Islanders	4–0	Columbus		Halak	14,295	4–1–1	9	Recap
7	October 23	Boston	5–3	NY Islanders		Halak	13,113	4–2–1	9	Recap
8	October 24	NY Islanders	3–2	St. Louis	OT	Greiss	19,186	5–2–1	11	Recap
9	October 26	Calgary	0–4	NY Islanders		Halak	11,582	6–2–1	13	Recap
10	October 29	Carolina	3–2	NY Islanders	OT	Greiss	11,494	6–2–2	14	Recap
11	October 31	NY Islanders	2–3	New Jersey	SO	Halak	11,605	6–2–3	15	Recap

November: 7–6–1 (Home: 4–3–0; Road: 3–3–1)
#	Date	Visitor	Score	Home	OT	Decision	Attendance	Record	Pts	Recap
12	November 1	Buffalo	2–1	NY Islanders		Greiss	11,278	6–3–3	15	Recap
13	November 3	New Jersey	1–2	NY Islanders		Halak	12,122	7–3–3	17	Recap
14	November 5	NY Islanders	1–4	Montreal		Halak	21,288	7–4–3	17	Recap
15	November 8	Boston	2–1	NY Islanders		Halak	13,197	7–5–3	17	Recap
16	November 10	NY Islanders	4–2	San Jose		Greiss	16,558	8–5–3	19	Recap
17	November 12	NY Islanders	1–2	Los Angeles		Halak	18,230	8–6–3	19	Recap
18	November 13	NY Islanders	4–1	Anaheim		Greiss	17,174	9–6–3	21	Recap
19	November 16	Arizona	2–5	NY Islanders		Halak	11,841	10–6–3	23	Recap
20	November 20	Montreal	5–3	NY Islanders		Halak	15,171	10–7–3	23	Recap
21	November 22	NY Islanders	2–4	Montreal		Greiss	21,288	10–8–3	23	Recap
22	November 25	Philadelphia	1–3	NY Islanders		Halak	13,027	11–8–3	25	Recap
23	November 27	NY Islanders	2–3	Florida	SO	Halak	14,598	11–8–4	26	Recap
24	November 28	NY Islanders	3–2	Tampa Bay		Greiss	19,092	12–8–4	28	Recap
25	November 30	Colorado	3–5	NY Islanders		Greiss	11,585	13–8–4	30	Recap

December: 8–4–1 (Home: 4–2–0; Road: 4–2–1)
#	Date	Visitor	Score	Home	OT	Decision	Attendance	Record	Pts	Recap
26	December 2	NY Rangers	1–2	NY Islanders	SO	Halak	15,795	14–8–4	32	Recap
27	December 4	St. Louis	1–2	NY Islanders	SO	Greiss	12,873	15–8–4	34	Recap
28	December 5	NY Islanders	2–3	Ottawa	OT	Halak	17,281	15–8–5	35	Recap
29	December 8	NY Islanders	4–3	Philadelphia	SO	Halak	18,108	16–8–5	37	Recap
30	December 12	NY Islanders	3–2	Columbus	OT	Halak	12,342	17–8–5	39	Recap
31	December 13	New Jersey	0–4	NY Islanders		Greiss	13,259	18–8–5	41	Recap
32	December 15	Florida	5–1	NY Islanders		Halak	13,656	18–9–5	41	Recap
33	December 17	NY Islanders	1–2	Colorado		Greiss	15,811	18–10–5	41	Recap
34	December 19	NY Islanders	0–1	Arizona		Halak	11,878	18–11–5	41	Recap
35	December 21	Anaheim	2–5	NY Islanders		Halak	13,578	19–11–5	43	Recap
36	December 27	Toronto	3–1	NY Islanders		Greiss	15,795	19–12–5	43	Recap
37	December 29	NY Islanders	6–3	Toronto		Greiss	19,899	20–12–5	45	Recap
38	December 31	NY Islanders	2–1	Buffalo		Greiss	19,070	21–12–5	47	Recap

January: 4–4–1 (Home: 3–2–1; Road: 1–2–0)
#	Date	Visitor	Score	Home	OT	Decision	Attendance	Record	Pts	Recap
39	January 2	NY Islanders	2–5	Pittsburgh		Greiss	18,665	21–13–5	47	Recap
40	January 3	Dallas	5–6	NY Islanders		Greiss	14,054	22–13–5	49	Recap
41	January 7	Washington	4–1	NY Islanders		Halak	14,261	22–14–5	49	Recap
42	January 9	NY Islanders	0–4	Philadelphia		Halak	19,874	22–15–5	49	Recap
43	January 12	Columbus	2–5	NY Islanders		Greiss	13,115	23–15–5	51	Recap
44	January 14	NY Rangers	1–3	NY Islanders		Halak	15,795	24–15–5	53	Recap
45	January 17	Vancouver	2–1	NY Islanders	SO	Halak	15,795	24–15–6	54	Recap
46	January 22	NY Islanders	5–2	Ottawa		Halak	18,305	25–15–6	56	Recap
–	January 23	Philadelphia		NY Islanders	Game rescheduled to April 10 due to hazardous weather.
47	January 25	Detroit	4–2	NY Islanders		Halak	12,086	25–16–6	56	Recap

February: 8–4–1 (Home: 4–0–1; Road: 4–4–0)
#	Date	Visitor	Score	Home	OT	Decision	Attendance	Record	Pts	Recap
48	February 2	Minnesota	3–5	NY Islanders		Berube	13,331	26–16–6	58	Recap
49	February 4	NY Islanders	2–3	Washington		Halak	18,506	26–17–6	58	Recap
50	February 6	NY Islanders	1–5	Detroit		Halak	20,027	26–18–6	58	Recap
51	February 7	Edmonton	1–8	NY Islanders		Greiss	14,030	27–18–6	60	Recap
52	February 9	NY Islanders	3–2	Columbus	SO	Halak	14,303	28–18–6	62	Recap
53	February 11	Los Angeles	2–5	NY Islanders		Greiss	13,643	29–18–6	64	Recap
54	February 13	NY Islanders	3–6	Carolina		Halak	12,665	29–19–6	64	Recap
55	February 15	Detroit	1–4	NY Islanders		Greiss	15,795	30–19–6	66	Recap
56	February 18	Washington	3–2	NY Islanders	OT	Greiss	15,795	30–19–7	67	Recap
57	February 19	NY Islanders	1–0	New Jersey		Halak	16,514	31–19–7	69	Recap
58	February 23	NY Islanders	4–1	Minnesota		Halak	19,085	32–19–7	71	Recap
59	February 25	NY Islanders	2–1	Calgary	OT	Halak	19,289	33–19–7	73	Recap
60	February 28	NY Islanders	1–3	Edmonton		Halak	16,839	33–20–7	73	Recap

March: 9–5–2 (Home: 5–1–0; Road: 4–4–2)
#	Date	Visitor	Score	Home	OT	Decision	Attendance	Record	Pts	Recap
61	March 1	NY Islanders	3–2	Vancouver		Greiss	18,264	34–20–7	75	Recap
62	March 3	NY Islanders	4–3	Winnipeg	OT	Greiss	15,294	35–20–7	77	Recap
63	March 6	NY Islanders	6–4	NY Rangers		Halak	18,006	36–20–7	79	Recap
64	March 8	Pittsburgh	1–2	NY Islanders		Halak	14,724	37–20–7	81	Recap
65	March 9	NY Islanders	3–4	Toronto	SO	Greiss	18,889	37–20–8	82	Recap
66	March 12	NY Islanders	1–3	Boston		Greiss	17,565	37–21–8	82	Recap
67	March 14	Florida	2–3	NY Islanders		Greiss	14,106	38–21–8	84	Recap
68	March 15	NY Islanders	1–2	Pittsburgh	SO	Berube	18,456	38–21–9	85	Recap
69	March 17	NY Islanders	2–4	Nashville		Greiss	17,113	38–22–9	85	Recap
70	March 19	NY Islanders	0–3	Dallas		Greiss	18,532	38–23–9	85	Recap
71	March 21	Philadelphia	4–1	NY Islanders		Greiss	14,329	38–24–9	85	Recap
72	March 23	Ottawa	1–3	NY Islanders		Berube	13,837	39–24–9	87	Recap
73	March 25	NY Islanders	4–7	Tampa Bay		Greiss	19,092	39–25–9	87	Recap
74	March 26	NY Islanders	4–3	Carolina	OT	Berube	11,636	40–25–9	89	Recap
75	March 29	Carolina	1–2	NY Islanders	SO	Greiss	13,733	41–25–9	91	Recap
76	March 31	Columbus	3–4	NY Islanders		Greiss	13,857	42–25–9	93	Recap

April: 3–2–1 (Home: 1–2–1; Road: 2–0–0)
#	Date	Visitor	Score	Home	OT	Decision	Attendance	Record	Pts	Recap
77	April 2	Pittsburgh	5–0	NY Islanders		Berube	15,795	42–26–9	93	Recap
78	April 4	Tampa Bay	2–5	NY Islanders		Greiss	13,106	43–26–9	95	Recap
79	April 5	NY Islanders	4–3	Washington	OT	Gibson	18,506	44–26–9	97	Recap
80	April 7	NY Islanders	4–1	NY Rangers		Greiss	18,006	45–26–9	99	Recap
81	April 9	Buffalo	4–3	NY Islanders	OT	Gibson	14,811	45–26–10	100	Recap
82	April 10	Philadelphia	5–2	NY Islanders		Gibson	14,244	45–27–10	100	Recap

Legend: Win (2 points) Loss (0 points) Overtime/shootout loss (1 point)

=== Playoffs ===
2016 Stanley Cup playoffs

Eastern Conference first round vs. (A1) Florida Panthers: Islanders won series 4–2
#	Date	Visitor	Score	Home	OT	Decision	Attendance	Series	Recap
1	April 14	NY Islanders	5–4	Florida		Greiss	17,422	1–0	Recap
2	April 15	NY Islanders	1–3	Florida		Greiss	18,373	1–1	Recap
3	April 17	Florida	3–4	NY Islanders	OT	Greiss	15,795	2–1	Recap
4	April 20	Florida	2–1	NY Islanders		Greiss	15,795	2–2	Recap
5	April 22	NY Islanders	2–1	Florida	2OT	Greiss	20,247	3–2	Recap
6	April 24	Florida	1–2	NY Islanders	2OT	Greiss	15,795	4–2	Recap

Eastern Conference second round vs. (A2) Tampa Bay Lightning: Lightning won series 4–1
#	Date	Visitor	Score	Home	OT	Decision	Attendance	Series	Recap
1	April 27	NY Islanders	5–3	Tampa Bay		Greiss	19,092	1–0	Recap
2	April 30	NY Islanders	1–4	Tampa Bay		Greiss	19,092	1–1	Recap
3	May 3	Tampa Bay	5–4	NY Islanders	OT	Greiss	15,795	2–1	Recap
4	May 6	Tampa Bay	2–1	NY Islanders	OT	Greiss	15,795	3–1	Recap
5	May 8	NY Islanders	0–4	Tampa Bay		Greiss	19,092	4–1	Recap

Legend: Win Loss

== Player statistics ==
Final Stats

Skaters

Regular season
Player	GP	G	A	Pts	+/−	PIM
John Tavares	78	33	37	70	6	38
Kyle Okposo	79	22	42	64	−4	51
Frans Nielsen	81	20	32	52	1	12
Brock Nelson	81	26	14	40	−3	30
Nick Leddy	81	5	35	40	−9	25
Anders Lee	80	15	21	36	−2	51
Josh Bailey	81	12	20	32	−7	22
Casey Cizikas	80	8	21	29	4	31
Ryan Strome	71	8	20	28	−9	28
Johnny Boychuk	70	9	16	25	17	31
Mikhail Grabovski	58	9	16	25	3	33
Cal Clutterbuck	77	15	8	23	7	22
Nikolay Kulemin	81	9	13	22	13	22
Travis Hamonic	72	5	16	21	−5	35
Matt Martin	80	10	9	19	2	119
Thomas Hickey	62	6	12	18	9	30
Marek Zidlicky	53	4	12	16	5	20
Calvin de Haan	72	2	14	16	3	20
Steve Bernier	24	1	5	6	3	9
Brian Strait	52	1	5	6	1	31
Shane Prince†	20	3	2	5	3	4
Ryan Pulock	15	2	2	4	1	5
Adam Pelech	9	0	2	2	−1	0
Alan Quine	2	1	0	1	0	0
Scott Mayfield	6	1	0	1	−4	11
Bracken Kearns	2	0	1	1	1	4
Eric Boulton	6	0	0	0	−3	2
Ross Johnston	1	0	0	0	0	4
Taylor Beck‡	2	0	0	0	0	2

Playoffs
Player	GP	G	A	Pts	+/−	PIM
John Tavares	11	6	5	11	−3	6
Kyle Okposo	11	2	6	8	−3	4
Frans Nielsen	11	3	3	6	−3	2
Alan Quine	10	1	4	5	−1	2
Brock Nelson	11	1	4	5	−5	6
Thomas Hickey	11	1	4	5	−5	8
Shane Prince	11	3	1	4	−1	0
Ryan Strome	8	1	3	4	1	2
Nick Leddy	11	1	3	4	1	0
Nikolay Kulemin	11	1	3	4	−5	2
Josh Bailey	9	2	1	3	−4	2
Cal Clutterbuck	11	2	1	3	−2	12
Travis Hamonic	11	1	2	3	−2	8
Ryan Pulock	6	1	2	3	−4	0
Casey Cizikas	11	0	3	3	−1	16
Calvin de Haan	11	0	2	2	−5	2
Marek Zidlicky	5	0	1	1	2	4
Matt Martin	11	0	0	0	−1	12
Steve Bernier	6	0	0	0	−2	0
Johnny Boychuk	11	0	0	0	−7	4

Goaltenders

Regular season
Player	GP	GS	TOI	W	L	OT	GA	GAA	SA	SV%	SO	G	A	PIM
Thomas Greiss	41	38	2287	23	11	4	90	2.36	1197	0.925	1	0	1	2
Jaroslav Halak	36	36	2091	18	13	4	80	2.30	984	0.919	3	0	1	0
Jean-Francois Berube	7	6	399	3	2	1	18	2.71	210	0.914	0	0	0	0
Christopher Gibson	4	2	194	1	1	1	11	3.40	93	0.882	0	0	0	0

Playoffs
Player	GP	GS	TOI	W	L	OT	GA	GAA	SA	SV%	SO	G	A	PIM
Thomas Greiss	11	11	733	5	6	2	30	2.46	388	.923	0	0	0	0
Jean-Francois Berube	1	0	5	0	0	0	0	0.00	2	1.000	0	0	0	0

^{†}Denotes player spent time with another team before joining the Islanders. Stats reflect time with the Islanders only.
^{‡}Denotes player was traded mid-season. Stats reflect time with the Islanders only.
Bold/italics denotes franchise record.

== Notable achievements ==
=== Awards ===
Regular season
Player	Award	Awarded
John Tavares	NHL All-Star game selection	January 6, 2016
John Tavares	NHL All-Star game replacement captain	January 28, 2016
John Tavares	NHL First Star of the Week	April 11, 2016

=== Milestones ===
Regular season
Player	Milestone	Reached
Jean-Francois Berube	1st Career NHL Game	October 10, 2015
Nikolay Kulemin	100th Career NHL Goal	October 15, 2015
Cal Clutterbuck	500th Career NHL Game	October 17, 2015
Frans Nielsen	100th Career NHL Goal; 200th Career NHL Assist; 300th Career NHL Point	October 17, 2015
Johnny Boychuk	400th Career NHL Game	October 23, 2015
Adam Pelech	1st Career NHL Game	November 13, 2015
Marek Zidlicky	800th Career NHL Game	November 16, 2015
Kyle Okposo	200th Career NHL Assist	November 16, 2015
Thomas Greiss	100th Career NHL Game	November 28, 2015
Mikhail Grabovski	500th Career NHL Game	November 28, 2015
Josh Bailey	500th Career NHL Game	November 30, 2015
Christopher Gibson	1st Career NHL Game	January 2, 2016
Matt Martin	400th Career NHL Game	January 9, 2016
Adam Pelech	1st Career NHL Point; 1st Career NHL Assist	January 13, 2016
Brock Nelson	200th Career NHL Game	January 22, 2016
Travis Hamonic	100th Career NHL Assist	January 22, 2016
Jean-Francois Berube	1st Career NHL Win	February 2. 2016
Kyle Okposo	500th Career NHL Game	February 9, 2016
Brock Nelson	100th Career NHL Point	February 15, 2016
Ryan Pulock	1st Career NHL Game	February 28, 2016
Jack Capuano	200th Career NHL Head Coaching Win	March 3, 2016
Jaroslav Halak	200th Career NHL Win	March 8, 2016
Nick Leddy	400th Career NHL Game	March 8, 2016
John Tavares	200th Career NHL Goal	March 12, 2016
Ryan Pulock	1st Career NHL Point; 1st Career NHL Goal	March 17, 2016
John Tavares	500th Career NHL Game	March 21, 2016
Frans Nielsen	600th Career NHL Game	March 29, 2016
Christopher Gibson	1st Career NHL Win	April 5, 2016
Scott Mayfield	1st Career NHL Point; 1st Career NHL Goal	April 9, 2016
Alan Quine	1st Career NHL Game; 1st Career NHL Point; 1st Career NHL Goal	April 9, 2016
Ross Johnston	1st Career NHL Game	April 10, 2016
Ryan Pulock	1st Career NHL Assist	April 10, 2016

== Transactions ==
Following the end of the Islanders' 2014–15 season, and during the 2015–16 season, this team has been involved in the following transactions:

=== Trades ===
Date	Details		Ref
June 26, 2015	To Edmonton Oilers Griffin Reinhart	To New York Islanders PIT's 1st-round pick in 2015; 2nd-round pick in 2015
June 27, 2015	To Tampa Bay Lightning EDM's 2nd-round pick in 2015; FLA's 3rd-round pick in 2015	To New York Islanders NYR's 1st-round pick in 2015
June 27, 2015	To Florida Panthers 5th-round pick in 2016	To New York Islanders MTL's 5th-round pick in 2015
September 16, 2015	To Toronto Maple Leafs Michael Grabner	To New York Islanders Taylor Beck; Carter Verhaeghe; Matt Finn; Tom Nilsson; Christopher Gibson
February 29, 2016	To Colorado Avalanche Taylor Beck	To New York Islanders Marc-Andre Cliche
February 29, 2016	To Ottawa Senators 3rd-round pick in 2016	To New York Islanders Shane Prince; 7th-round pick in 2016

=== Free agents acquired ===
Date	Player	Former team	Contract terms (in U.S. dollars)	Ref
July 1, 2015	Thomas Greiss	Pittsburgh Penguins	2 years, $3 million	
July 2, 2015	Justin Florek	Providence Bruins	1 year, $725,000	
July 2, 2015	Ben Holmstrom	Charlotte Checkers	1 year, $750,000	
July 2, 2015	Bracken Kearns	Espoo Blues	1 year, $775,000	
July 2, 2015	Justin Vaive	Hartford Wolf Pack	1 year, $650,000	
July 2, 2015	Joe Whitney	New Jersey Devils	1 year, $750,000	
July 2, 2015	James Wright	KHL Medvescak Zagreb	1 year, $800,000	
July 17, 2015	Louis Leblanc	Norfolk Admirals	1 year, $605,000	
September 17, 2015	Steve Bernier	New Jersey Devils	1 year, $750,000	
September 18, 2015	Marek Zidlicky	Detroit Red Wings	1 year, $1.5 million	

=== Free agents lost ===
Date	Player	New team	Contract terms (in U.S. dollars)	Ref
July 1, 2015	Matt Donovan	Buffalo Sabres	1 year, $825,000	
July 1, 2015	Kael Mouillierat	Pittsburgh Penguins	1 year, $575,000	
July 1, 2015	Aaron Ness	Washington Capitals	1 year, $575,000	
July 1, 2015	Michal Neuvirth	Philadelphia Flyers	2 years, $3.25 million	
July 2, 2015	Brett Gallant	Columbus Blue Jackets	2 years, $1.5 million	
July 3, 2015	Colin McDonald	Philadelphia Flyers	1 year, $625,000	
July 3, 2015	Harry Zolnierczyk	Anaheim Ducks	1 year, $600,000	
October 27, 2015	Lubomir Visnovsky	HC Slovan Bratislava	undisclosed	

=== Claimed via waivers ===
Player	Previous team	Date
Jean-Francois Berube	Los Angeles Kings	October 6, 2015

=== Lost via waivers ===
Player	New team	Date
Kevin Poulin	Tampa Bay Lightning	September 27, 2015

=== Player signings ===
Date	Player	Contract terms (in U.S. dollars)	Ref
June 30, 2015	Anders Lee	4 years, $15 million	
July 1, 2015	Thomas Hickey	3 years, $6.6 million	
July 1, 2015	Kirill Petrov	1 year, entry-level contract	
August 11, 2015	Kevin Poulin	1 year, $600,000	
September 10, 2015	Mathew Barzal	3 years, entry-level contract	
September 16, 2015	Brock Nelson	3 years, $7.5 million	
October 13, 2015	Eric Boulton	1 year, $575,000	
October 23, 2015	Anthony Beauvillier	3 years, entry-level contract	
March 23, 2016	Eamon McAdam	3 years, entry-level contract	
March 29, 2016	Kyle Schempp	2 years, entry-level contract	
April 15, 2016	Devon Toews	3 years, entry-level contract	
May 2, 2016	Parker Wotherspoon	3 years, entry-level contract	
June 1, 2016	Bracken Kearns	1 year, $800,000	
June 2, 2016	Ben Holmstrom	1 year, $800,000	
June 2, 2016	Casey Cizikas	5 years, $16.75 million	

== Draft picks ==
Below are the New York Islanders' selections at the 2015 NHL entry draft, to be held on June 26–27, 2015 at the BB&T Center in Sunrise, Florida.

Round	#	Player	Pos	Nationality	College/Junior/Club team (League)
1	16	Mathew Barzal	Centre	Canada	Seattle Thunderbirds (WHL)
1	28	Anthony Beauvillier	LW	Canada	Shawinigan Cataractes (QMJHL)
3	82	Mitchell Vande Sompel	D	Canada	Oshawa Generals (OHL)
4	112	Parker Wotherspoon	D	Canada	Tri-City Americans (WHL)
5	147	Ryan Pilon	D	Canada	Brandon Wheat Kings (WHL)
6	172	Andong Song	D	China	Lawrenceville School (HS-New Jersey)
7	202	Peter Hansson	D	Sweden	Linköpings J20 (J20 SuperElit)

Draft notes

- The Pittsburgh Penguins' first-round pick went to the New York Islanders as the result of a trade on June 26, 2015, that sent Griffin Reinhart to Edmonton in exchange for a second-round pick in 2015 (33rd overall) and this pick.
  Edmonton previously acquired this pick as the result of a trade on January 2, 2015, that sent David Perron to Pittsburgh in exchange for Rob Klinkhammer and this pick.
- The New York Islanders' first-round pick will go to the Buffalo Sabres as the result of a trade on October 27, 2013, that sent Thomas Vanek to New York in exchange for Matt Moulson, a second-round pick in 2015 and this pick (being conditional at the time of the trade). The condition – Buffalo will receive a first-round pick in 2014 or 2015 at New York's choice – was converted on May 22, 2014, when the Islanders elected to keep their 2014 first-round pick.
- The New York Islanders' first-round pick went to the Ottawa Senators as the result of a trade on June 26, 2015, that sent Robin Lehner and David Legwand to Buffalo in exchange for this pick.
  Buffalo previously acquired this pick as the result of a trade on October 27, 2013, that sent Thomas Vanek to New York in exchange for Matt Moulson, a second-round pick in 2015 and this pick (being conditional at the time of the trade). The condition – Buffalo will receive a first-round pick in 2014 or 2015 at New York's choice – was converted on May 22, 2014, when the Islanders elected to keep their 2014 first-round pick.

The New York Rangers' first-round pick went to the New York Islanders as the result of a trade on June 26, 2015, that sent Edmonton's second-round pick in 2015 (33rd overall) and Florida's third-round pick in 2015 (72nd overall) to Tampa Bay in exchange for this pick.

- Tampa Bay previously acquired this pick as the result of trade on March 5, 2014, that sent Martin St. Louis and a conditional second-round pick in 2015 to New York in exchange for Ryan Callahan, a conditional first-round pick in 2014, a conditional seventh-round pick in 2015 and this pick.
- The New York Islanders' fifth-round pick went to the San Jose Sharks as the result of a trade on June 5, 2014, that sent Dan Boyle to New York in exchange for this pick (being conditional at the time of the trade). The condition – San Jose will receive a fifth-round pick in 2015 if Boyle is not re-signed by the Islanders for the 2014–15 NHL season – was converted on July 1, 2014.
- The Montreal Canadiens' fifth-round pick went to the New York Islanders as the result of a trade on June 27, 2015, that sent a fifth-round pick in 2016 to Florida in exchange for this pick.
  Florida previously acquired this pick as the result of a trade on March 4, 2014, that sent Mike Weaver to Montreal in exchange for this pick.
