= 2015–16 Tampa Bay Lightning season =

National Hockey League team season

2015–16 Tampa Bay Lightning
- Division: 2nd Atlantic
- Conference: 6th Eastern
- 2015–16 record: 46–31–5
- Home record: 25–13–3
- Road record: 21–18–2
- Goals for: 227
- Goals against: 201

Team information
- General manager: Steve Yzerman
- Coach: Jon Cooper
- Captain: Steven Stamkos
- Alternate captains: Ryan Callahan; Rotating
- Arena: Amalie Arena
- Average attendance: 19,092 (100%)
- Minor league affiliate: Syracuse Crunch (AHL)

Team leaders
- Goals: Steven Stamkos (36)
- Assists: Victor Hedman (37)
- Points: Nikita Kucherov (66)
- Penalty minutes: J. T. Brown (59)
- Plus/minus: Victor Hedman (+21)
- Wins: Ben Bishop (35)
- Goals against average: Ben Bishop (2.06)

The 2015–16 Tampa Bay Lightning season was the 24th season for the National Hockey League (NHL) franchise that was established on December 16, 1991. The Lightning entered the season as the defending Eastern Conference champions.

The regular season began on October 8, 2015 against the Philadelphia Flyers with a 3–2 victory, with Jason Garrison scoring the first 3-on-3 overtime goal in NHL history.

== Off-season ==
=== June ===
The off season for the Lightning began on June 15, 2015, when the Lightning lost in the Stanley Cup Finals in six games to the Chicago Blackhawks. On June 17, 2015, during exit interviews, Lightning general manager Steve Yzerman stated that his number one priority was to sign Steven Stamkos to a long-term contract. Stamkos also expressed his desire to remain with the team when stated that "I've said it all along, I want to win a championship with this group. It's been a great ride this year. I know we'll have some talks, whether it's in the next day or weeks, I don't know. But we'll definitely be getting something worked out hopefully shortly." Yzerman stated that Stamkos had fulfilled all the team's expectations and had played through an undisclosed injury during the latter stages of the playoffs. The nature and the extent of the injury were not revealed during exit interviews. Yzerman also addressed the teams goaltending and expected roster changes in his interview. Yzerman stated that he would be really comfortable with Ben Bishop and Andrei Vasilevskiy as the goalies heading into the season. Yzerman also added that he was not looking to move either goalies, and that he'd like to enjoy the tandem for another year or two. When answering questions on the roster, Yzerman said that he did not expect a lot of roster changes by pointing out that Vladislav Namestnikov, Jonathan Drouin, and Nikita Nesterov will get more opportunities with the team in the coming season. On the injury front, Lightning center Tyler Johnson revealed that he was not sure if his broken right wrist would require surgery in the off season. He said that he got hurt in Game 1 of the Stanley Cup Finals when he landed on it after getting checked at mid-ice by Chicago Blackhawks defenseman Brent Seabrook. Goalie Ben Bishop said that his groin tear suffered in the final will not require surgery, just rest in the off season.

On June 22, 2015, the Lightning released its preseason schedule for the 2015–16 NHL season. The Lightning will be playing the Nashville Predators, Florida Panthers, and Dallas Stars at Amalie Arena and at their opponents venue. In addition to these opponents, the Lightning will face the Pittsburgh Penguins in the inaugural Kraft Hockeyville USA game in Johnstown, Pennsylvania. The game will be nationally televised on NBC Sports Network. Johnstown was selected "Kraft Hockeyville USA" through a public voting system at www.krafthockeyville.com. Along with being the host arena, the Johnstown Cambria County War Memorial Arena will receive $150,000 in upgrades. Fans may be familiar with the arena, because it was the inspiration for Charestown and the Chiefs in the 1977 Paul Newman film Slap Shot. Later in the same day, assistant coach George Gwozdecky announced that he was leaving the team to pursue other opportunities. Gwozdecky said that he felt this decision coming for "a while," and that after his two-year deal expired, he and the team mutually agreed to part ways. He also stated that "I have nothing but great memories, great things to say about the team, about the organization," and that "it was a great learning experience. In his phone interview, Gwozdecky said he does not have anything lined up, other than some rest and relaxation. George will be attending this week's NHL draft with the Lightning, and taking part in the coaches association meetings before making his annual drive back home to Denver.

On June 23, 2015, the Lightning announced that they will continue their partnership with the Lyon Hockey Club Lions for the 2015–16 season. The affiliation will last the entire season, which includes business and marketing elements for the clubs. The key component is that the Lightning's AHL affiliate, the Syracuse Crunch, will hold training camp and play preseason games versus the Utica Comets in Lyon, France. The games will take place at Charlemagne Skating Rink, which has been home to the Lions since 1967.

On June 24, 2015, the National Hockey League held its annual awards ceremony in Las Vegas. The lone member of the team nominated for an award was General Manager Steve Yzerman. Yzerman was voted the winner of the award, and became the first Lightning General Manager to win the award in team history. In Yzerman's first season as general manager, the team reach the Conference finals in 2010-11. From there Yzerman oversaw the rebuild of the roster that reached the 2015 Stanley Cup Finals, with only two holdovers from the 2011 team (Steven Stamkos, Victor Hedman). Yzerman bolstered the roster with draft acquisitions (Nikita Kucherov, Ondrej Palat), free agency (Brian Boyle, Valtteri Filppula, Tyler Johnson, Anton Stralman), and trades (Ben Bishop, Ryan Callahan, Braydon Coburn, Jason Garrison). This resulted in the Lightning setting franchise records with 50 wins and 108 points during the regular season. The Lightning led the league with 262 goals and 32 home wins. In the playoffs the Lightning captured their second Prince of Wales Trophy in franchise history, which earned them a berth in their second Stanley Cup Finals.

The Lightning are set to host a four team rookie tournament at Germain Arena in Estero, Florida, which takes place from September 12–15. The arena is the home of the Lightning's ECHL affiliate, the Florida Everblades. The teams participating will be the Nashville Predators, the Florida Panthers and the Washington Capitals. This is the first time in franchise history that the Lightning has hosted a rookie tournament. As with previous tournaments the team participated in, the tournament will feature some of the top young talent the respective teams have to offer.

On June 28, 2015, the Lightning announced the signing of forward Jonathan Marchessault to a one-year, two way contract. Marchessault appeared in two Stanley Cup Playoff games with the Lightning this past postseason. He also appeared in two games during the regular season, recording one goal. This was first career goal, which was scored on April 11, 2015. In addition, Marchessault played in 68 AHL games with the Syracuse Crunch last season, ranking sixth in the league in assists(43). The Lightning also announced the signing of Brian Hart to a three-year, two-way contract. Hart appeared in 37 games with the Harvard Crimson during the 2014-15 season, recording seven goals and 17 points. Hart has played in 98 career games with Harvard over three seasons, recording 18 goals and 50 points.

On June 29, 2015, the Lightning announced the signing of forward Mike Blunden to a one-year, two-way contract. Blunden appeared in two regular season games with the Lightning last season, recording two penalty minutes. He also played in 33 games with the Syracuse Crunch, recording 13 goals and 22 points. Over his professional career, Blunden has appeared in 104 NHL games with the Lightning, the Montreal Canadiens, the Columbus Blue Jackets and Chicago Blackhawks. Blunden has also appeared in 412 career AHL games, posting 96 goals and 209 points.

On June 30, 2015, the Lightning re-signed Andrej Sustr to a two-year, one-way contract. Sustr played in 72 regular season games, recording 13 assists and 34 penalty minutes. These were all career highs for Sustr. Sustr also appeared in 26 Stanley Cup Playoff games with the Lightning, registering one goal and two points. Sustr has played in 117 career NHL games, all with Tampa over the past three seasons, collecting one goal and 21 points. Sustr was fourth in blocked shots on the team (84), and he set the Lightning franchise record for the best plus/minus (+7) in a playoff series in the first round of the 2015 Stanley Cup Playoffs against the Detroit Red Wings. The team also announced the re-signing of Syracuse Crunch captain, Mike Angelidis, to a one-year contract. Angelidis appeared in three games with the Lightning last season, recording 12 penalty minutes. He also played in 64 games for the Crunch in 2014-15, recording 20 goals and 38 points.

=== July ===
On July 1, 2015, the Lightning signed free agent forward Erik Condra to a three-year contract with a $1.25 million average. Condra had played the previous five seasons with the Ottawa Senators, which is the team he was originally drafted by in the 2006 NHL Draft in the 7th round. Condra had 9 goals and 14 assists in 68 games. Condra is known for his strong work on the penalty kill, which could make Condra a key third/fourth-line player and penalty killer for the Lightning. Condra also has ties to Lightning head coach Jon Cooper, who played for him while Cooper was coach of Texarkana of the USHL. The signing of Condra likely means that Brenden Morrow's tenure with the team is coming to an end. Later in the day, the Lightning announced the signing of free agent defensemen Matt Taormina to a one-year, two-way contract. Taormina played 76 games with the Worcester Sharks of the AHL, notching 11 goals and 38 points. This will be Taromina's second stint with the organization, having previously played with both the Lightning and the Crunch over two seasons.

On July 5, 2015, the Lightning signed forward Jeff Tambellini to a one-year, two-way contract. Tambellini has skated in 242 NHL games over six season, recording 27 goals and 63 points. He played his last NHL season with the Vancouver Canucks during the 2010-11 season. In the 2014-15 season, Tambellini skated in 30 games with Fribourg-Gotteron of the Swiss-A league, registering five goals and 13 points. He also played in 20 games with Vaxjo Lakers in the Swedish Hockey League, recording six goals and nine points.

On July 8, 2015, the Lightning re-signed Philippe Paradis to a one-year, two-way contract. Paradis skated in 34 games with the Syracuse Crunch during the 2014-15 season, posting 8 goals and 15 points to go along with 49 penalty minutes. Paradis missed the final three months of the season due to an injury. Despite missing three months, he recorded a career best in goals.

On July 17, 2015, the Lightning announced the re-signing of forward Vladislav Namestnikov and defenseman Luke Witkowski one-year, two-way contract. Namestnikov skated in 43 games with the Lightning during the 2014-15 NHL season, posting nine goals and 16 points (9-7-16), which were all career highs. Namestnikov appeared in 12 Stanley Cup playoff games in 2015, recording one assist. In addition, he played in 34 games with the Syracuse Crunch during the 2014-15 season, registering 14 goals and 35 points. Namestnikov represented the Crunch at the 2015 AHL All-Star Classic. Witkowski played in 16 games with the Lightning during the 2014015 season, recording 15 penalty minutes. He had 37 hits and blocked 20 shots during his sixteen-game stint with the team. Witkowski skated in 50 games with the Crunch last season, collecting two goals and eight points along with 91 penalty minutes. He also skated in three Calder Cup Playoff games with Syracuse in 2015, posting one assist and four penalty minutes.

On July 21, 2015, the Lightning announced the signing of forward Tye McGinn to a one-year, two-way contract. McGinn skated in 51 games in the NHL last season, between the San Jose Sharks and the Arizona Coyotes, posting two goals and seven points. McGinn has appeared in 87 career NHL games over three seasons, recording nine goals and 17 points to go along with 44 penalty minutes. McGinn has also skated in 163 career AHL games over three seasons, collecting 46 goals and 79 points.

On July 24, 2015, the Lightning announced that Chief Executive Officer Tod Leiweke had resigned to become Chief Operating Officer of the National Football League. Effective immediately, Lightning President Steve Griggs has been named as the orgization's Chief Executive Officer.

On July 29, 2015, the ECHL league owners voted unanimously to have single affiliation with NHL teams. Tampa's ECHL affiliate the Florida Everblades are now solely affiliated with the Carolina Hurricanes. Everblades President and general manager Craig Bursh said the owners wanted the 28 teams in the league to have an affiliation opportunity.

=== August ===
On August 6, 2015, the Lightning announced their 23-man roster that will represent the team at the 2015 Prospect Tournament, which the team is hosting for the first time in franchise history. The Lightning team consists of all draft picks with the exception of one, Daniel Walcott, who was acquired from the New York Rangers via trade. Some notable names participating in the tournament are Slater Koekkoek, Tony DeAngelo, Adam Wilcox, Brayden Point, Adam Erne, and Matthew Peca. Six draft picks from the 2015 NHL entry draft will be participating in the tournament, including top pick Mitchell Stephens, and fellow forwards Anthony Cirelli, Boko Imama, Mathiue Joseph, Dennis Yan, as well as defenseman Matthew Spencer.

On August 11, 2015, Fox's Sun Sports, the regional television home of the Lightning, announced Brian Engblom as Bobby Taylor's replacement on color commentary for the 2015–16 season. Prior to joining Sun Sports, Engblom served as "Inside the glass" analyst on both NBC and NBC Sports Network, as well as the network's coverage of the 2014 Winter Olympics in Sochi, Russia. Engblom has served as an analyst on NHL Live, and also served as color analyst for Winnipeg Jets Games on TSN in Canada. Prior to being an announcer, Engblom played at the University of Wisconsin, and was Montreal's third pick, 22nd overall, in the 1975 NHL entry draft. He won three Stanley cups with the Canadiens (1978–1979). Engblom played for five different teams in his career: the Montreal Canadiens, Washington Capitals, Los Angeles Kings, Buffalo Sabres, and Calgary Flames. He retired as a player in 1987.

On August 18, 2015, the Lightning announced the hiring of Brad Lauer as an assistant coach, which fills the vacancy left by the departure of George Gwozdecky at the end of the season. Lauer indicated that he will primarily work with the forwards, and collaborate with Cooper on the power play. Lauer spent the previous four seasons with the Anaheim Ducks as an assistant coach. As a player, he was drafted by the New York Islanders. He played in 323 NHL games with the Islanders, Senators, Blackhawks, and Penguins, recording 44 goals and 111 points.

=== September ===
On September 4, 2015, the Lightning announced that Andrei Vasilevskiy had undergone surgery the day before to remove a blood clot near his collarbone. Vasilevskiy arrived in Tampa this week reporting swelling in his upper left arm. Vasilevskiy was sent to the doctor as a precaution, where he was diagnosed with a type of thoracic outlet syndrome, which is a condition considered rare among hockey players. Lightning General Manager, Steve Yzerman, was encouraged that Vasilevskiy's surgery would not effect him long term. Dr. Karl Illig said that 90 to 95 percent of people get back to being a high level athlete. The prognosis for Vasilevskiy's recovery is between two and three months. Yzerman said that the team would look at Kristers Gudlevskis, Allen York, and Adam Wilcox as potential backups to Ben Bishop during training camp. However, Yzerman did not rule out the possibility of bringing in a veteran NHL goalie to compete for the backup goalie position.

On September 8, 2015, the Lightning announced that they brought in veteran goalie Ray Emery and center Ryan Martindale on a training camp tryouts. Emery, 32, has played nine NHL seasons, the last two with the Flyers. Emery is expected to get a look at being the potential backup goalie, while Vasilevskiy recovers from his medical procedure.

On September 17, 2015, the Lightning announced the signing of defenseman Daniel Walcott to a three-year, two-way contract. Walcott, skated in 54 games last season with Blainville-Boisbriand Armada of the Quebec Major Junior Hockey League, recording 7 goals and 41 points. He was first on the team among defensemen in goals, assists and points. He also appeared in six playoff games, recording a goal and four points. In his QMJHL career, he has appeared in 121 games, all with the Armada, collecting 17 goals and 80 points. He made his professional debut last season with the Hartford Wolf Pack of the American Hockey League on an ATO.

== Training camp ==
=== September ===
On September 23, 2015, the Lightning announced their first training camp roster cuts. The team reduced its training camp roster by ten players, which reducing the camp roster to 53 players. Goalie Philippe Cadorette and defenseman Kevin Gibson were released from their professional tryout agreements. Anthony Cirelli, Cristiano Digiacinto, Bokondji Imama, Mathieu Joseph, Matthew Spencer, Mitchell Stephens, Ben Thomas, and Dennis Yan were assigned to their respective junior hockey clubs.

On September 24, 2015, the Lightning announced that defenseman Dominik Masin had been reassigned to the Peterborough Petes of the Ontario Hockey League, which reduces the training camp roster to 53. Masin is expected to get a larger role playing for the Petes this season than he would have with the crowded blue line in Syracuse.

On September 27, 2015, the Lightning announced a series of roster cuts that reduced their training camp roster to 29 players. The Lightning prospects cut from that list are Blujus, DeAngelo, Dotchin, Erne, Gourde, Hart, Ikonen, Peca, Richard, Vermin, Walcott and Wilcox. The following veteran players have to clear waivers to be assigned to the Syracuse Crunch: Mike Blunden, Philippe Paradis, Tye McGinn, Jeff Tambellini, and Matt Taormina. In addition to the roster cuts, the Lightning announced that Ray Emery had been cut from his PTO with the team, and that the team had claimed goaltender Kevin Poulin off waivers from the New York Islanders. Poulin is expected to compete with Kristers Gudlevskis for the temporary backup role behind starter Ben Bishop while Andrei Vasilevskiy recovers from his injury. Poulin, 25, has played in 50 NHL games, going 18-25 with a 3.07 goals against average.

On September 28, 2015, it was announced that all five Syracuse Crunch player that the Lightning put on waivers Sunday afternoon cleared NHL waivers today, allowing them to join the AHL team. The five veterans will be part of the roster that travels to Lyon, France today for a three-game tournament. Potential Syracuse assignment players still with Tampa that would require waivers to skate with Crunch are Syracuse team captain Mike Angelidis and Jonathan Marchessault.

=== October ===
On October 1, 2015, the Lightning announced that Brayden Point had been reassigned to the Moose Jaw Warriors of the Western Hockey League. Point played in two games for the Lightning this preseason, recording three shots. Point also skated in all three of the team's prospect tournament games in Estero last month, recording a goal and three points. He was tied for third on the Bolts for points during the tournament.

On October 5, 2015, the Lightning announced that forwards Mike Angelidis and Jonathan Marchessault had been placed on waivers for the purpose of assigning them to the Syracuse Crunch. Both forwards will have to go unclaimed on waivers for twenty four hours before they are officially assigned the Crunch. The Lightning also provided an update on injured backup goalie Andrei Vasilevskiy. Today Vasilevskiy did an on ice work out goalie coach Frantz Jean, facing shots from close range. He is still on blood thinners, which is restricting him from facing shots in the left shoulder area. He has an appointment on October 21, which will hopefully clear him for a return to full practice. Vasilevskiy stated that he thinks he will need a few games in Syracuse on a conditioning assignment before he is ready to return to the lineup.

On October 6, the Lightning announced that goalie Kristers Gudlevskis and defenseman Luke Witkowski had been assigned to the Syracuse Crunch. With Gudlevskis assigned, it appears that Kevin Poulin will serve as the temporary backup behind Ben Bishop. Defensemen Slater Koekkoek and Nikita Nesterov are still with the team, though things may change since the team has indicated that it wants to carry seven defensemen.

On October 7, 2015, the Lightning assigned Slater Koekkoek to the Syracuse Crunch. Yzerman said that both Koekkoek and Witkowski impressed during training camp and are expected to help the Lightning during the season when needed. Yzerman also said, "If we wanted to we could have kept them on this team. They're better off playing a lot of minutes in the American Hockey League." On the same day, Lightning head coach Jon Cooper announced that Ryan Callahan will wear a permanent "A" as an alternate captain this season. Cooper said the other "A" will be rotated among a group of players for the season.

== Standings ==
Atlantic Division
Pos	Team	GP	W	L	OTL	ROW	GF	GA	GD	Pts
1	y – Florida Panthers	82	47	26	9	40	239	203	+36	103
2	x – Tampa Bay Lightning	82	46	31	5	43	227	201	+26	97
3	x – Detroit Red Wings	82	41	30	11	39	211	224	−13	93
4	Boston Bruins	82	42	31	9	38	240	230	+10	93
5	Ottawa Senators	82	38	35	9	32	236	247	−11	85
6	Montreal Canadiens	82	38	38	6	33	221	236	−15	82
7	Buffalo Sabres	82	35	36	11	33	201	222	−21	81
8	Toronto Maple Leafs	82	29	42	11	23	198	246	−48	69

Source: National Hockey League
x – Clinched playoff spot; y – Clinched division

== Schedule and results ==
=== Preseason ===
2015 Preseason game log: 3–3–1 (home: 2–0–1; road: 1–2–0; Neutral: 0–1–0)

Game	Date	Opponent	Score	OT	Decision	Location	Attendance	Record	Recap
1	September 22	Nashville Predators	2–3	OT	Wilcox	Amalie Arena	14,324	0–0–1	
2	September 23	@ Nashville Predators	2–5		Wilcox	Bridgestone Arena	14,186	0–1–1	
3	September 25	Florida Panthers	4–1		Bishop	Amalie Arena	16,226	1–1–1	
4	September 26	@ Dallas Stars	3–6		Emery	American Airlines Center	14,676	1–2–1	
5^{[a]}	September 29	vs. Pittsburgh Penguins	2–4		Poulin	Cambria County War Memorial Arena	––	1–3–1	
6	October 1	Dallas Stars	3–2		Bishop	Amalie Arena	14,226	2–3–1	
7	October 3	@ Florida Panthers	3–2		Bishop	BB&T Center	7,634	3–3–1	

Lightning score listed first;

Win Loss Overtime/shootout loss
^{a} Kraft Hockeyville game

=== Regular season ===
2015–16 Game Log
October: 5–5–2, 12 Points (home: 2–3–0; road: 3–2–2)

Game	Date	Opponent	Score	OT	Decision	Location	Attendance	Record	Points	Recap
1	October 8	Philadelphia Flyers	3–2	OT	Bishop	Amalie Arena	19,092	1–0–0	2	
2	October 10	@ Buffalo Sabres	4–1		Bishop	First Niagara Center	17,739	2–0–0	4	
3	October 12	@ Boston Bruins	6–3		Bishop	TD Garden	17,565	3–0–0	6	
4	October 13	@ Detroit Red Wings	1–3		Bishop	Joe Louis Arena	20,027	3–1–0	6	
5	October 15	Dallas Stars	3–5		Bishop	Amalie Arena	19,092	3–2–0	6	
6	October 17	Buffalo Sabres	2–1		Bishop	Amalie Arena	19,092	4–2–0	8	
7	October 20	@ Nashville Predators	4–5	SO	Bishop	Bridgestone Arena	17,113	4–2–1	9	
8	October 23	@ Winnipeg Jets	4–3	OT	Bishop	MTS Centre	15,294	5–2–1	11	
9	October 24	@ Chicago Blackhawks	0–1	OT	Gudlevskis	United Center	21,822	5–2–2	12	
10	October 27	@ St. Louis Blues	0–2		Bishop	Scottrade Center	19,184	5–3–2	12	
11	October 29	Colorado Avalanche	1–2		Bishop	Amalie Arena	19,092	5–4–2	12	
12	October 31	Boston Bruins	1–3		Bishop	Amalie Arena	19,092	5–5–2	12	

November: 6–6–1, 13 Points (home: 4–2–1; road: 2–4–0)

Game	Date	Opponent	Score	OT	Decision	Location	Attendance	Record	Points	Recap
13	November 1	@ Carolina Hurricanes	4–3		Vasilevskiy	PNC Arena	9,081	6–5–2	14	
14	November 3	@ Detroit Red Wings	1–2		Bishop	Joe Louis Arena	20,027	6–6–2	14	
15	November 5	@ Buffalo Sabres	4–1		Vasilevskiy	First Niagara Center	18,161	7–6–2	16	
16	November 7	@ Minnesota Wild	0–1		Bishop	Xcel Energy Center	19,066	7–7–2	16	
17	November 10	Buffalo Sabres	1–4		Vasilevskiy	Amalie Arena	19,092	7–8–2	16	
18	November 12	Calgary Flames	3–1		Bishop	Amalie Arena	19,092	8–8–2	18	
19	November 14	Florida Panthers	4–5	SO	Bishop	Amalie Arena	19,092	8–8–3	19	
20	November 16	@ Florida Panthers	0–1		Vasilevskiy	BB&T Center	12,067	8–9–3	19	
21	November 19	New York Rangers	2–1		Bishop	Amalie Arena	19,092	9–9–3	21	
22	November 21	Anaheim Ducks	5–0		Bishop	Amalie Arena	19,092	10–9–3	23	
23	November 25	Los Angeles Kings	2–1	SO	Bishop	Amalie Arena	19,092	11–9–3	25	
24	November 27	@ Washington Capitals	2–4		Vasilevskiy	Verizon Center	18,506	11–10–3	25	
25	November 28	New York Islanders	2–3		Bishop	Amalie Arena	19,092	11–11–3	25	

December: 7–5–1, 15 Points (home: 3–3–1; road: 4–2–0)

Game	Date	Opponent	Score	OT	Decision	Location	Attendance	Record	Points	Recap
26	December 2	@ Anaheim Ducks	2–1		Bishop	Honda Center	14,741	12–11–3	27	
27	December 5	@ San Jose Sharks	4–3		Bishop	SAP Center	16,089	13–11–3	29	
28	December 6	@ Los Angeles Kings	1–3		Vasilevskiy	Staples Center	18,230	13–12–3	29	
29	December 10	Ottawa Senators	4–1		Bishop	Amalie Arena	19,092	14–12–3	31	
30	December 12	Washington Capitals	1–2		Bishop	Amalie Arena	19,092	14–13–3	31	
31	December 14	@ Columbus Blue Jackets	2–1		Bishop	Nationwide Arena	12,494	15–13–3	33	
32	December 15	@ Toronto Maple Leafs	5–4	OT	Vasilevskiy	Air Canada Centre	18,989	16–13–3	35	
33	December 18	@ Washington Capitals	3–5		Bishop	Verizon Center	18,506	16–14–3	35	
34	December 20	Ottawa Senators	5–2		Bishop	Amalie Arena	19,092	17–14–3	37	
35	December 22	Vancouver Canucks	1–2		Bishop	Amalie Arena	19,092	17–15–3	37	
36	December 26	Columbus Blue Jackets	5–2		Bishop	Amalie Arena	19,092	18–15–3	39	
37	December 28	Montreal Canadiens	3–4	SO	Bishop	Amalie Arena	19,092	18–15–4	40	
38	December 30	New York Rangers	2–5		Bishop	Amalie Arena	19,092	18–16–4	40	

January: 9–2–0, 18 Points (home: 6–0–0; road: 3–2–0)

Game	Date	Opponent	Score	OT	Decision	Location	Attendance	Record	Points	Recap
39	January 2	Minnesota Wild	3–2	SO	Vasilevskiy	Amalie Arena	19,092	19–16–4	42	
40	January 5	@ Calgary Flames	1–3		Bishop	Scotiabank Saddledome	18,966	19–17–4	42	
41	January 8	@ Edmonton Oilers	3–2		Bishop	Rexall Place	16,839	20–17–4	44	
42	January 9	@ Vancouver Canucks	3–2	OT	Vasilevskiy	Rogers Arena	18,335	21–17–4	46	
43	January 12	@ Colorado Avalanche	4–0		Bishop	Pepsi Center	14,227	22–17–4	48	
44	January 15	Pittsburgh Penguins	5–4	OT	Vasilevskiy	Amalie Arena	19,092	23–17–4	50	
45	January 17	Florida Panthers	3–1		Bishop	Amalie Arena	19,092	24–17–4	52	
46	January 19	Edmonton Oilers	6–4		Vasilevskiy	Amalie Arena	19,092	25–17–4	54	
47	January 21	Chicago Blackhawks	2–1		Bishop	Amalie Arena	19,092	26–17–4	56	
48	January 23	@ Florida Panthers	2–5		Bishop	BB&T Center	19,626	26–18–4	56	
49	January 27	Toronto Maple Leafs	1–0		Vasilevskiy	Amalie Arena	19,092	27–18–4	58	
All-Star Break (January 28–February 1)

February: 10–4–0, 20 Points (home: 5–2–0; road: 5–2–0)

Game	Date	Opponent	Score	OT	Decision	Location	Attendance	Record	Points	Recap
50	February 3	Detroit Red Wings	3–1		Bishop	Amalie Arena	19,092	28–18–4	60	
51	February 5	Pittsburgh Penguins	6–3		Bishop	Amalie Arena	19,092	29–18–4	62	
52	February 8	@ Ottawa Senators	1–5		Vasilevskiy	Canadian Tire Centre	17,078	29–19–4	62	
53	February 9	@ Montreal Canadiens	2–4		Bishop	Bell Centre	21,288	29–20–4	62	
54	February 12	Nashville Predators	4–3	OT	Bishop	Amalie Arena	19,092	30–20–4	64	
55	February 14	St. Louis Blues	1–2		Bishop	Amalie Arena	19,092	30–21–4	64	
56	February 16	San Jose Sharks	2–4		Bishop	Amalie Arena	19,092	30–22–4	64	
57	February 18	Winnipeg Jets	6–5	SO	Vasilevskiy	Amalie Arena	19,092	31–22–4	66	
58	February 20	@ Pittsburgh Penguins	4–2		Bishop	Consol Energy Center	18,643	32–22–4	68	
59	February 21	@ Carolina Hurricanes	4–2		Bishop	PNC Arena	10,422	33–22–4	70	
60	February 23	Arizona Coyotes	2–1		Vasilevskiy	Amalie Arena	19,092	34–22–4	72	
61	February 26	@ New Jersey Devils	4–0		Bishop	Prudential Center	15,968	35–22–4	74	
62	February 28	@ Boston Bruins	4–1		Bishop	TD Garden	17,565	36–22–4	76	
63	February 29	@ Toronto Maple Leafs	2–1		Vasilevskiy	Air Canada Centre	18,933	37–22–4	78	

March: 7–6–1, 15 Points (home: 4–3–1; road: 3–3–0)

Game	Date	Opponent	Score	OT	Decision	Location	Attendance	Record	Points	Recap
64	March 3	@ Ottawa Senators	4–1		Bishop	Canadian Tire Center	17,943	38–22–4	80	
65	March 5	Carolina Hurricanes	4–3	OT	Bishop	Amalie Arena	19,092	39–22–4	82	
66	March 7	@ Philadelphia Flyers	2–4		Vasilevskiy	Wells Fargo Center	17,906	39–23–4	82	
67	March 8	Boston Bruins	0–1	OT	Bishop	Amalie Arena	19,092	39–23–5	83	
68	March 11	Philadelphia Flyers	1–3		Bishop	Amalie Arena	19,092	39–24–5	83	
69	March 13	@ Columbus Blue Jackets	4–0		Bishop	Nationwide Arena	14,701	40–24–5	85	
70	March 15	@ Toronto Maple Leafs	1–4		Vasilevskiy	Air Canada Centre	18,874	40–25–5	85	
71	March 17	@ Dallas Stars	3–4		Bishop	American Airlines Center	18,532	40–26–5	85	
72	March 19	@ Arizona Coyotes	2–0		Bishop	Gila River Arena	14,183	41–26–5	87	
73	March 22	Detroit Red Wings	6–2		Bishop	Amalie Arena	19,092	42–26–5	89	
74	March 25	New York Islanders	7–4		Bishop	Amalie Arena	19,092	43–26–5	91	
75	March 26	Florida Panthers	2–5		Vasilevskiy	Amalie Arena	19,092	43–27–5	91	
76	March 28	Toronto Maple Leafs	3–0		Bishop	Amalie Arena	19,092	44–27–5	93	
77	March 31	Montreal Canadiens	0–3		Bishop	Amalie Arena	19,092	44–28–5	93	

April: 2–3–0, 4 Points (home: 1–0–0; road: 1–3–0)

Game	Date	Opponent	Score	OT	Decision	Location	Attendance	Record	Points	Recap
78	April 2	New Jersey Devils	3–1		Bishop	Amalie Arena	19,092	45–28–5	95	
79	April 4	@ New York Islanders	2–5		Bishop	Barclays Center	13,106	45–29–5	95	
80	April 5	@ New York Rangers	2–3		Vasilevskiy	Madison Square Garden	18,006	45–30–5	95	
81	April 7	@ New Jersey Devils	4–2		Bishop	Prudential Center	15,536	46–30–5	97	
82	April 9	@ Montreal Canadiens	2–5		Vasilevskiy	Bell Centre	21,288	46–31–5	97	

Lightning score listed first;

Win (2 Points) Loss (0 points) Overtime/shootout loss (1 point)

=== Playoffs ===
2016 Stanley Cup Playoffs
Eastern Conference First Round vs. Detroit Red Wings (A3) - Tampa Bay won series 4–1

Game	Date	Opponent	Score	OT	Decision	Location	Attendance	Series	Recap
1	April 13	Detroit Red Wings	3–2		Bishop	Amalie Arena	19,092	1–0	
2	April 15	Detroit Red Wings	5–2		Bishop	Amalie Arena	19,092	2–0	
3	April 17	@ Detroit Red Wings	0–2		Bishop	Joe Louis Arena	20,027	2–1	
4	April 19	@ Detroit Red Wings	3–2		Bishop	Joe Louis Arena	20,027	3–1	
5	April 21	Detroit Red Wings	1–0		Bishop	Amalie Arena	19,092	4–1	

Eastern Conference Second Round vs. New York Islanders (WC1) - Tampa Bay won series 4–1

Game	Date	Opponent	Score	OT	Decision	Location	Attendance	Series	Recap
1	April 27	New York Islanders	3–5		Bishop	Amalie Arena	19,092	0–1	
2	April 30	New York Islanders	4–1		Bishop	Amalie Arena	19,092	1–1	
3	May 3	@ New York Islanders	5–4	OT	Bishop	Barclays Center	15,795	2–1	
4	May 6	@ New York Islanders	2–1	OT	Bishop	Barclays Center	15,795	3–1	
5	May 8	New York Islanders	4–0		Bishop	Amalie Arena	19,092	4–1	

Eastern Conference Finals vs. Pittsburgh Penguins (M2) - Pittsburgh won series 4–3

Game	Date	Opponent	Score	OT	Decision	Location	Attendance	Series	Recap
1	May 13	@ Pittsburgh Penguins	3–1		Vasilevskiy	Consol Energy Center	18,554	1–0	
2	May 16	@ Pittsburgh Penguins	2–3	OT	Vasilevskiy	Consol Energy Center	18,534	1–1	
3	May 18	Pittsburgh Penguins	2–4		Vasilevskiy	Amalie Arena	19,092	1–2	
4	May 20	Pittsburgh Penguins	4–3		Vasilevskiy	Amalie Arena	19,092	2–2	
5	May 22	@ Pittsburgh Penguins	4–3	OT	Vasilevskiy	Consol Energy Center	18,648	3–2	
6	May 24	Pittsburgh Penguins	2–5		Vasilevskiy	Amalie Arena	19,092	3–3	
7	May 26	@ Pittsburgh Penguins	1–2		Vasilevskiy	Consol Energy Center	18,638	3–4	

Lightning score listed first;

Win Loss If necessary

== Player stats ==
Final stats

=== Skaters ===
Regular season
Player	GP	G	A	Pts	+/−	PIM
Nikita Kucherov	77	30	36	66	9	30
Steven Stamkos	77	36	28	64	3	38
Victor Hedman	78	10	37	47	21	46
Ondrej Palat	62	16	24	40	10	20
Alexander Killorn	81	14	26	40	14	44
Tyler Johnson	69	14	24	38	4	20
Vladislav Namestnikov	80	14	21	35	17	45
Anton Stralman	73	9	25	34	16	20
Valtteri Filppula	76	8	23	31	−6	46
Ryan Callahan	73	10	18	28	−5	45
J. T. Brown	78	8	14	22	16	59
Andrej Sustr	77	4	17	21	−2	30
Brian Boyle	76	13	7	20	−7	57
Jonathan Marchessault	45	7	11	18	−10	17
Erik Condra	54	6	5	11	−4	34
Cedric Paquette	56	6	5	11	−2	51
Jason Garrison	72	5	6	11	−4	18
Jonathan Drouin	21	4	6	10	1	4
Braydon Coburn	80	1	9	10	12	53
Nikita Nesterov	57	3	6	9	−6	41
Matt Carle	64	2	7	9	4	26
Mike Blunden	20	3	2	5	3	34
Mike Angelidis	4	1	0	1	2	5
Slater Koekkoek	9	0	1	1	−1	2
Joel Vermin	6	0	1	1	1	0
Yanni Gourde	2	0	1	1	1	2
Luke Witkowski	4	0	0	0	0	4
Matt Taormina	3	0	0	0	0	0
Tye McGinn	2	0	0	0	0	0

Playoffs
Player	GP	G	A	Pts	+/−	PIM
Nikita Kucherov	17	11	8	19	13	8
Tyler Johnson	17	7	10	17	9	12
Jonathan Drouin	17	5	9	14	−1	14
Victor Hedman	17	4	10	14	2	14
Alexander Killorn	17	5	8	13	6	42
Ondrej Palat	17	4	6	10	0	14
Valtteri Filppula	17	1	6	7	5	0
Jason Garrison	17	1	6	7	4	12
Brian Boyle	17	5	0	5	−1	20
Matt Carle	14	0	5	5	1	4
Ryan Callahan	16	2	2	4	−3	29
Vladislav Namestnikov	17	1	2	3	0	0
Andrej Sustr	17	1	2	3	7	16
Braydon Coburn	17	0	2	2	0	12
J. T. Brown	9	0	2	2	0	2
Anton Stralman	6	1	0	1	−2	2
Nikita Nesterov	9	0	1	1	1	9
Jonathan Marchessault	5	0	1	1	1	6
Slater Koekkoek	10	0	1	1	−1	2
Cedric Paquette	17	0	1	1	0	24
Mike Blunden	7	0	0	0	−2	4
Erik Condra	3	0	0	0	−1	0
Luke Witkowski	2	0	0	0	1	0
Matt Taormina	3	0	0	0	1	0
Steven Stamkos	1	0	0	0	−1	0

=== Goaltenders ===
Regular season
Player	GP	GS	TOI	W	L	OT	GA	GAA	SA	SV%	SO	G	A	PIM
Ben Bishop	61	60	3585	35	21	4	123	2.06	1672	.926	6	0	1	4
Andrei Vasilevskiy	24	21	1259	11	10	0	58	2.76	646	.910	1	0	0	0
Kristers Gudlevskis	1	1	60	0	0	1	1	1.00	32	.969	0	0	0	0

Playoffs
Player	GP	GS	TOI	W	L	GA	GAA	SA	SV%	SO	G	A	PIM
Ben Bishop	11	11	582	8	2	18	1.86	297	.939	2	0	0	0
Andrei Vasilevskiy	8	6	434	3	4	20	2.76	267	.925	0	0	0	0

^{†}Denotes player spent time with another team before joining Tampa Bay. Stats reflect time with Tampa Bay only.
^{‡}Traded from Tampa Bay mid-season.
Bold/italics denotes franchise record

== Suspensions/fines ==
Player	Explanation	Length	Salary	Date issued
Nikita Nesterov	Boarding Dallas Stars forward Curtis McKenzie during NHL Game No. 54 in Tampa Bay on Thursday, October 15, 2015, at 15:56 of the second period.	2 games	$7,983.88	October 16, 2015

== Awards and honours ==
=== Awards ===
Regular season
Player	Award	Awarded
Steven Stamkos	NHL All-Star game selection	January 6, 2016
Ben Bishop	NHL All-Star game selection	January 6, 2016
Ryan Callahan	NHL second star of the week	February 29, 2016

=== Milestones ===
Regular season
Player	Milestone	Reached
Erik Condra	300th career NHL game	October 8, 2015
Steven Stamkos	500th career NHL point	October 12, 2015
Alex Killorn	100th career NHL point	October 12, 2015
Steven Stamkos	500th career NHL game	October 23, 2015
Ben Bishop	100th career NHL win	October 23, 2015
Victor Hedman	400th career NHL game	October 24, 2015
Alex Killorn	200th career NHL game	October 27, 2015
Jason Garrison	400th career NHL game	October 31, 2015
Joel Vermin	1st career NHL game	November 19, 2015
Joel Vermin	1st career NHL point	November 21, 2015
Anton Stralman	500th career NHL game	November 27, 2015
Nikita Kucherov	100th career NHL point	December 10, 2015
Brian Boyle	500th career NHL game	December 12, 2015
Yanni Gourde	1st career NHL game 1st career NHL assist 1st career NHL point	December 15, 2015
Victor Hedman	200th career NHL point	December 20, 2015
Ben Bishop	200th career NHL game	December 28, 2015
Tyler Johnson	200th career NHL game	January 5, 2016
Vladislav Namestnikov	1st career NHL Hat Trick	January 15, 2016
Ondrej Palat	200th career NHL game	February 3, 2016
Vladislav Namestnikov	100th career NHL game	February 9, 2016
Ryan Callahan	600th career NHL game	February 12, 2016
Matt Carle	700th career NHL game	February 16, 2016
Steven Stamkos	300th career NHL goal	February 20, 2016
Cedric Paquette	100th career NHL game	February 20, 2016
Valtteri Filppula	700th career NHL game	February 23, 2016
Slater Koekkoek	1st career NHL assist 1st career NHL point	March 7, 2016
Nikita Kucherov	200th career NHL game	March 11, 2016
Jason Garrison	100th career NHL assist	March 25, 2016

Playoffs
Player	Milestone	Reached
Jonathan Drouin	1st career playoff assist 1st career playoff point	April 15, 2016
Matt Taormina	1st career playoff game	April 19, 2016
Slater Koekkoek	1st career playoff game	April 30, 2016
Jonathan Drouin	1st career playoff goal	April 30, 2016
Vladislav Namestnikov	1st career playoff goal	May 3, 2016
Luke Witkowski	1st career playoff game	May 6, 2016
Slater Koekkoek	1st career playoff assist 1st career playoff point	May 24, 2016

== Transactions ==
The Lightning have been involved in the following transactions during the 2015–16 season.

=== Trades ===
Date	Details		Ref
June 26, 2015	To New York Islanders NYR's 1st-round pick in 2015	To Tampa Bay Lightning EDM's 2nd-round pick in 2015; FLA's 3rd-round pick in 2015
June 26, 2015	To Edmonton Oilers ANA's 7th-round pick in 2015	To Tampa Bay Lightning 7th-round pick in 2016
November 12, 2015	To Calgary Flames Kevin Poulin	To Tampa Bay Lightning Future Considerations

=== Free agents acquired ===
Date	Player	Former team	Contract terms (in U.S. dollars)	Ref
July 1, 2015	Erik Condra	Ottawa Senators	3 years, $3.75 million	
July 1, 2015	Matt Taormina	Worcester Sharks	1 year, $600,000	
July 5, 2015	Jeff Tambellini	Vaxjo Lakers	1 year, $575,000	
July 21, 2015	Tye McGinn	Arizona Coyotes	1 year, $660,000	

=== Free agents lost ===
Date	Player	New team	Contract terms (in U.S. dollars)	Ref
July 1, 2015	Mark Barberio	Montreal Canadiens	1 year, $600,000	
July 21, 2015	Carter Ashton	Torpedo Nizhny Novgorod	undisclosed	

=== Claimed via waivers ===
Player	Previous team	Date
Kevin Poulin	New York Islanders	September 27, 2015

=== Lost via waivers ===
Player	New team	Date

=== Player signings ===
Date	Player	Contract terms (in U.S. dollars)	Ref
June 28, 2015	Jonathan Marchessault	1 year, $600,000	
June 28, 2015	Brian Hart	3 year, $2.11 million	
June 29, 2015	Mike Blunden	1 year, $600,000	
June 30, 2015	Andrej Sustr	2 years, $2.9 million	
June 30, 2015	Mike Angelidis	1 year, $650,000	
July 8, 2015	Philippe Paradis	1 year, $600,000	
July 17, 2015	Vladislav Namestnikov	1 year, $874,125	
July 17, 2015	Luke Witkowski	1 year, $575,000	
September 18, 2015	Daniel Walcott	3 years, $2.77 million	
October 13, 2015	Dominik Masin	3 years, $2.77 million	
February 26, 2016	Braydon Coburn	3 years, $11.1 million contract extension	
March 22, 2016	Ben Thomas	3 years, $2.07 million	
April 1, 2016	Jonne Tammela	3 years, $2.77 million	
April 4, 2016	Mitchell Stephens	3 years, $2.77 million	
April 12, 2016	Matt Spencer	3 years, $2.77 million	
May 19, 2016	Anthony Cirelli	3 years, $2.77 million	
May 21, 2016	Joel Vermin	1 year, $575,000	
May 21, 2016	Tanner Richard	1 year, $575,000	

== Draft picks ==
Below are the Tampa Bay Lightning' selections at the 2015 NHL entry draft, held on June 26–27, 2015 at the BB&T Center in Sunrise, Florida.

Round	#	Player	Pos	Nationality	College/Junior/Club team (League)
2	33^{[a]}	Mitchell Stephens	C	Canada	Saginaw Spirit (OHL)
2	44^{[b]}	Matthew Spencer	D	Canada	Peterborough Petes (OHL)
3	64^{[c]}	Dennis Yan	LW	United States	Shawinigan Cataractes (QMJHL)
3	72^{[d]}	Anthony Cirelli	C	Canada	Oshawa Generals (OHL)
4	118^{[e]}	Jonne Tammela	RW	Finland	KalPa (Liiga)
4	120	Mathieu Joseph	RW	Canada	Saint John Sea Dogs (QMJHL)
5	150	Ryan Zuhlsdorf	D	United States	Sioux City Musketeers (USHL)
6	153^{[f]}	Kristian Oldham	G	United States	Omaha Lancers (USHL)
6	180	Bokondji Imama	LW	Canada	Saint John Sea Dogs (QMJHL)

Draft notes

- The Tampa Bay Lightning's first-round pick went to the Philadelphia Flyers as the result of a trade on March 2, 2015 that sent Braydon Coburn to Tampa Bay in exchange for Radko Gudas, a third-round pick in 2015 and this pick (being conditional at the time of the trade). The condition – Philadelphia will receive the Lightning's first-round draft pick in 2015 if it is not the first overall selection – was converted on March 30, 2015 when Tampa Bay qualified for the 2015 Stanley Cup playoffs ensuring that this pick could not be a lottery selection.
- ^{a} The Edmonton Oilers' second-round pick went to the Tampa Bay Lightning as the result of a trade on June 26, 2015 that sent the Rangers' first-round pick in 2015 (28th overall) to the New York Islanders in exchange for Florida's third-round pick in 2015 (72nd overall) and this pick.
  The Islanders previously acquired this pick as the result of a trade on June 26, 2015 that sent Griffin Reinhart to Edmonton in exchange for Pittsburgh's first-round pick in 2015 (16th overall) and this pick.
- ^{b} The Boston Bruins' second-round pick went to the Tampa Bay Lightning as the result of a trade on March 2, 2015 that sent Brett Connolly to Boston in exchange for a second-round pick in 2016 and this pick.
- The Tampa Bay Lightning's second-round pick went to the Calgary Flames as the result of a trade on June 27, 2015 that sent Calgary and Washington's third-round picks both in 2015 (76th and 83rd overall) to Arizona in exchange for this pick.
  Arizona previously acquired this pick, as the result of a trade on March 1, 2015 that sent Keith Yandle, Chris Summers and a fourth-round pick in 2016 to New York in exchange for John Moore, Anthony Duclair, a conditional first-round pick in 2016 and this pick.
  The Rangers previously acquired this pick as the result of a trade March 5, 2014 that sent Ryan Callahan, a conditional first-round pick in 2014, a first-round pick in 2015, and a conditional seventh-round pick in 2015 to Tampa Bay in exchange for Martin St. Louis and this pick (being conditional at the time of the trade). The condition – the Rangers will receive a second-round pick in 2015 if Callahan is re-signed by Tampa Bay for the 2014–15 NHL season – was converted on June 25, 2014 when Tampa Bay signed Callahan to a six-year contract.
- ^{c} The Edmonton Oilers' third-round pick went to the Tampa Bay Lightning as the result of a trade on November 28, 2014 that sent Eric Brewer to Anaheim in exchange for this pick.
- ^{d} The Florida Panthers' third-round pick went to the Tampa Bay Lightning as the result of a trade on June 26, 2015 that sent the Rangers' first-round pick in 2015 (28th overall) to the New York Islanders in exchange for Edmonton's second-round pick in 2015 (33rd overall) and this pick.
  The Islanders previously acquired this pick as the result of a trade on June 28, 2014 that sent a third-round pick in 2014 to Florida in exchange for this pick.
- The Tampa Bay Lightning's third-round pick went to the Philadelphia Flyers as the result of a trade on March 2, 2015 that sent Braydon Coburn to Tampa Bay in exchange for Radko Gudas, a conditional first-round pick in 2015 and this pick.
- ^{e} The Anaheim Ducks' fourth-round pick went to the Tampa Bay Lightning as the result of a trade on June 29, 2014 that sent Nate Thompson to Anaheim in exchange for a seventh-round pick in 2015 and this pick.
- ^{f} The Arizona Coyotes' sixth-round pick went to the Tampa Bay Lightning as the result of a trade on June 29, 2014 that sent Sam Gagner and B.J. Crombeen to Arizona in exchange for this pick.
- The Tampa Bay Lightning's seventh-round pick went to the New York Islanders as the result of a trade on June 28, 2014 that sent a seventh-round pick in 2014 to Tampa Bay in exchange for a seventh-round pick in 2014 and this pick.
