= 2015–16 Ottawa Senators season =

Season of professional ice hockey team

2015–16 Ottawa Senators
- Division: 5th Atlantic
- Conference: 11th Eastern
- 2015–16 record: 38–35–9
- Home record: 21–14–6
- Road record: 17–21–3
- Goals for: 236
- Goals against: 247

Team information
- General manager: Bryan Murray
- Coach: Dave Cameron
- Captain: Erik Karlsson
- Alternate captains: Chris Neil; Chris Phillips; Kyle Turris
- Arena: Canadian Tire Centre
- Average attendance: 18,085
- Minor league affiliates: Binghamton Senators (AHL); Evansville IceMen (ECHL)

Team leaders
- Goals: Mike Hoffman (29)
- Assists: Erik Karlsson (66)
- Points: Erik Karlsson (82)
- Penalty minutes: Chris Neil (165)
- Plus/minus: Jean-Gabriel Pageau (+17)
- Wins: Craig Anderson (31)
- Goals against average: Andrew Hammond (2.65)

The 2015–16 Ottawa Senators season was the 24th season of the Ottawa Senators of the National Hockey League (NHL). The Senators, along with all other Canadian teams, failed to make the playoffs. A major trade was made during the season to bring Dion Phaneuf to the Senators and improve the team defence, but the team was not able to make a run to secure a playoff spot. Two significant faults in the team were noted by the media: the club allowed 247 goals, third-highest in the league. Secondly, the team's penalty-killing unit ranked 29th in the league. One day after the regular season, general manager (GM) Bryan Murray stepped down and assistant GM Pierre Dorion became GM. Head coach Dave Cameron and the coaching staff were fired two days later.

== Off-season ==
Leading up to the off-season, the media frequently speculated about what the Ottawa Senators would and could do with their surplus of goaltenders. They had recently signed Andrew Hammond, who had had an outstanding 2014–15 season, to a three-year contract and college graduate Matt O'Connor to an entry-level contract. They already had starter Craig Anderson, who was signed until the end of the 2017–18 season, and backup Robin Lehner, considered to be an outstanding future starter, who was signed until the end of the 2016–17 season, and prospect Chris Driedger in the minors.

The logjam at the goaltending position was resolved on June 26, when general manager Bryan Murray completed a trade that saw Robin Lehner and forward David Legwand go to the Buffalo Sabres in exchange for the 21st overall pick (acquired by Buffalo from the New York Islanders in the Matt Moulson-Thomas Vanek trade) in the 2015 NHL entry draft. The Senators would use the pick to select right winger Colin White, who played for the USA Hockey National Team Development Program's under-18 team. White is committed to attend Boston College beginning in the fall of 2015. The inclusion of Legwand in the trade was done to free up salary cap space to re-sign several players.

On June 27, Murray completed another trade, sending defenceman Eric Gryba to the Edmonton Oilers in exchange for prospect forward Travis Ewanyk and a fourth-round 2015 draft pick, 107th overall, which the Senators used to select defenceman Christian Wolanin of the Muskegon Lumberjacks in the United States Hockey League (USHL). Wolanin will play for the University of North Dakota in the 2015–16 season.

On July 7, the Senators re-signed Luke Richardson to a one-year contract extension to remain head coach of their American Hockey League (AHL) affiliate, the Binghamton Senators, for the 2015–16 season. Richardson has been head coach of Binghamton since the 2010–11 season. In his first season at the helm, he led Binghamton to a 44–24–1–7 record, placing them fourth in the Eastern Conference. The team would end up winning the 2011 Calder Cup.

On July 26, an arbitrator awarded RFA right-winger Alex Chiasson a one-year contract worth $1.2 million. TSN Hockey Insider Frank Seravalli reported that Chiasson asked for a $2.475 million in his hearing that occurred on July 23 while the Senators countered with a $1 million offer.

On August 3, an arbitrator awarded RFA left-winger Mike Hoffman a one-year contract worth $2 million. Hoffman submitted a request for a one-year contract worth $3.4 million while the Senators offered a one-year, $1.75 million contract.

On September 5, the Canadian Press reported Senators defenceman Chris Phillips had suffered a major setback in his return to action after having back surgery back in April 2015. Phillips confirmed the report by informing Ottawa Sun sports columnist Bruce Garrioch that he cracked a disc in his back and there is currently no timetable for his return.

On September 17, the Senators announced that Daniel Alfredsson had returned to the organization. He will be the team's senior advisor of hockey operations. He reports to Bryan Murray.

== Pre-season ==
The Ottawa Senators played an eight-game preseason schedule beginning on Monday, September 21, 2015, and finishing on Saturday, October 3, 2015. The schedule featured split squad games against the Toronto Maple Leafs and home-and-home series against the Buffalo Sabres and Montreal Canadiens. It also featured a game against the Carolina Hurricanes taking place in St. John's, Newfoundland and Labrador.

== Regular season ==
The Senators began their season on the road in Buffalo, against the Sabres at the First Niagara Center. The home opener took place at the Canadian Tire Centre on October 11, 2015, against the Montreal Canadiens. The team concluded the home part of their schedule on April 7, 2016, against the Florida Panthers. Their final game of the regular season took place on April 9, 2016, at TD Garden in Boston.

On Sunday, October 11, 2015, rookie goaltender Matt O'Connor made his NHL debut against the Montreal Canadiens in a 3–1 loss. The goaltender for the Canadiens that night was rookie goaltender Mike Condon. This marked the first time that two NHL rookie goaltenders made their NHL debuts in the same game since October 14, 1967 when Wayne Rutledge of the Los Angeles Kings faced Doug Favell of the Philadelphia Flyers.

In February 2016, the Senators and Toronto Maple Leafs made a sensational trade of nine players and a draft pick. The Senators acquired Toronto captain Dion Phaneuf, plus Matt Frattin and three prospects, in exchange for Jared Cowen, Colin Greening, Milan Michalek, prospect Tobias Lindberg and a second-round 2017 draft pick. The two rival teams interests coincided for a rare trade between the two. The Maple Leafs wished to trade Phaneuf to rid the team of his contract. Similarly, the Senators wanted to move Cowen and Greening and Michalek. After the trade, Cowen revealed he had requested a trade; he had become a regular healthy scratch for the team. Greening had lost his NHL job, but had a one-way contract, and Michalek had a relatively high $4 million per season contract. Frattin was not transferred from the AHL Toronto Marlies to Binghamton, he remained with the Marlies on a loan.

== Playoffs ==
The Senators failed to qualify for the Stanley Cup playoffs, after being eliminated on March 30, 2016.

== Standings ==
Atlantic Division
| Pos | Team | GP | W | L | OTL | ROW | GF | GA | GD | Pts |
|---|---|---|---|---|---|---|---|---|---|---|
| 1 | y – Florida Panthers | 82 | 47 | 26 | 9 | 40 | 239 | 203 | +36 | 103 |
| 2 | x – Tampa Bay Lightning | 82 | 46 | 31 | 5 | 43 | 227 | 201 | +26 | 97 |
| 3 | x – Detroit Red Wings | 82 | 41 | 30 | 11 | 39 | 211 | 224 | −13 | 93 |
| 4 | Boston Bruins | 82 | 42 | 31 | 9 | 38 | 240 | 230 | +10 | 93 |
| 5 | Ottawa Senators | 82 | 38 | 35 | 9 | 32 | 236 | 247 | −11 | 85 |
| 6 | Montreal Canadiens | 82 | 38 | 38 | 6 | 33 | 221 | 236 | −15 | 82 |
| 7 | Buffalo Sabres | 82 | 35 | 36 | 11 | 33 | 201 | 222 | −21 | 81 |
| 8 | Toronto Maple Leafs | 82 | 29 | 42 | 11 | 23 | 198 | 246 | −48 | 69 |

Source: National Hockey League
x – Clinched playoff spot; y – Clinched division

Eastern Conference Wild Card
| Pos | Div | Team | GP | W | L | OTL | ROW | GF | GA | GD | Pts |
|---|---|---|---|---|---|---|---|---|---|---|---|
| 1 | ME | x – New York Islanders | 82 | 45 | 27 | 10 | 40 | 232 | 216 | +16 | 100 |
| 2 | ME | x – Philadelphia Flyers | 82 | 41 | 27 | 14 | 38 | 214 | 218 | −4 | 96 |
| 3 | AT | Boston Bruins | 82 | 42 | 31 | 9 | 38 | 240 | 230 | +10 | 93 |
| 4 | ME | Carolina Hurricanes | 82 | 35 | 31 | 16 | 33 | 198 | 226 | −28 | 86 |
| 5 | AT | Ottawa Senators | 82 | 38 | 35 | 9 | 32 | 236 | 247 | −11 | 85 |
| 6 | ME | New Jersey Devils | 82 | 38 | 36 | 8 | 36 | 184 | 208 | −24 | 84 |
| 7 | AT | Montreal Canadiens | 82 | 38 | 38 | 6 | 33 | 221 | 236 | −15 | 82 |
| 8 | AT | Buffalo Sabres | 82 | 35 | 36 | 11 | 33 | 201 | 222 | −21 | 81 |
| 9 | ME | Columbus Blue Jackets | 82 | 34 | 40 | 8 | 28 | 219 | 252 | −33 | 76 |
| 10 | AT | Toronto Maple Leafs | 82 | 29 | 42 | 11 | 23 | 198 | 246 | −48 | 69 |

Source: National Hockey League
x – Clinched playoff spot

== Schedule and results ==
=== Pre-season ===
2015 Pre-Season: 3–3–2 (Home: 1–1–1; Road: 2–2–1)
| # | Date | Visitor | Score | Home | OT | Decision | Attendance | Record | Recap |
|---|---|---|---|---|---|---|---|---|---|
| 1 | September 21 | Ottawa (SS) | 1–4 | Toronto (SS) | | Hammond | 16,734 | 0–1–0 |
| 2 | September 21 | Toronto (SS) | 4–3 | Ottawa (SS) | OT | O'Connor | 15,542 | 0–1–1 |
| 3 | September 23 | Ottawa | 5–2 | Buffalo | | O'Connor | 17,298 | 1–1–1 |
| 4 | September 26 | Buffalo | 6–4 | Ottawa | | Anderson | 16,738 | 1–2–1 |
| 5 | September 27 | Ottawa | 1–2 | Carolina (St. John's, NL) | | Hammond | –– | 1–3–1 |
| 6 | September 29 | Ottawa | 3–4 | Winnipeg | OT | Hammond | 15,294 | 1–3–2 |
| 7 | October 1 | Ottawa | 5–2 | Montreal | | Anderson | 21,287 | 2–3–2 |
| 8 | October 3 | Montreal | 4–5 | Ottawa | | O'Connor | 17,912 | 3–3–2 |

=== Regular season ===
2015–16 Regular Season

October: 5–4–2 (Home: 1–3–2; Road: 4–1–0)
| # | Date | Visitor | Score | Home | OT | Decision | Attendance | Record | Pts | Recap |
|---|---|---|---|---|---|---|---|---|---|---|
| 1 | October 8 | Ottawa | 3–1 | Buffalo | | Anderson | 19,070 | 1–0–0 | 2 |
| 2 | October 10 | Ottawa | 5–4 | Toronto | SO | Anderson | 19,187 | 2–0–0 | 4 |
| 3 | October 11 | Montreal | 3–1 | Ottawa | | O'Connor | 19,177 | 2–1–0 | 4 |
| 4 | October 14 | Ottawa | 7–3 | Columbus | | Anderson | 13,803 | 3–1–0 | 6 |
| 5 | October 15 | Ottawa | 0–2 | Pittsburgh | | Anderson | 18,486 | 3–2–0 | 6 |
| 6 | October 17 | Nashville | 4–3 | Ottawa | SO | Anderson | 16,895 | 3–2–1 | 7 |
| 7 | October 22 | New Jersey | 5–4 | Ottawa | SO | Hammond | 16,578 | 3–2–2 | 8 |
| 8 | October 24 | Arizona | 4–1 | Ottawa | | Anderson | 17,270 | 3–3–2 | 8 |
| 9 | October 28 | Calgary | 4–5 | Ottawa | SO | Anderson | 16,923 | 4–3–2 | 10 |
| 10 | October 30 | Ottawa | 3–1 | Detroit | | Hammond | 20,027 | 5–3–2 | 12 |
| 11 | October 31 | Detroit | 5–3 | Ottawa | | Anderson | 16,964 | 5–4–2 | 12 |

November: 7–2–3 (Home: 4–0–2; Road: 3–2–1)
| # | Date | Visitor | Score | Home | OT | Decision | Attendance | Record | Pts | Recap |
|---|---|---|---|---|---|---|---|---|---|---|
| 12 | November 3 | Ottawa | 2–1 | Montreal | OT | Anderson | 21,288 | 6–4–2 | 14 |
| 13 | November 5 | Winnipeg | 2–3 | Ottawa | SO | Anderson | 17,195 | 7–4–2 | 16 |
| 14 | November 7 | Ottawa | 2–3 | Carolina | OT | Hammond | 10,005 | 7–4–3 | 17 |
| 15 | November 10 | Ottawa | 5–7 | Nashville | | Anderson | 16,963 | 7–5–3 | 17 |
| 16 | November 12 | Vancouver | 2–3 | Ottawa | | Hammond | 19,229 | 8–5–3 | 19 |
| 17 | November 14 | NY Rangers | 2–1 | Ottawa | SO | Anderson | 19,310 | 8–5–4 | 20 |
| 18 | November 16 | Detroit | 4–3 | Ottawa | OT | Anderson | 16,718 | 8–5–5 | 21 |
| 19 | November 19 | Columbus | 0–3 | Ottawa | | Anderson | 16,925 | 9–5–5 | 23 |
| 20 | November 21 | Philadelphia | 0–4 | Ottawa | | Anderson | 18,578 | 10–5–5 | 25 |
| 21 | November 24 | Ottawa | 7–4 | Dallas | | Anderson | 18,532 | 11–5–5 | 27 |
| 22 | November 25 | Ottawa | 5–3 | Colorado | | Anderson | 16,570 | 12–5–5 | 29 |
| 23 | November 28 | Ottawa | 3–4 | Arizona | | Anderson | 12,727 | 12–6–5 | 29 |

December: 6–8–1 (Home: 5–2–0; Road: 1–6–1)
| # | Date | Visitor | Score | Home | OT | Decision | Attendance | Record | Pts | Recap |
|---|---|---|---|---|---|---|---|---|---|---|
| 24 | December 1 | Philadelphia | 4–2 | Ottawa | | Anderson | 17,010 | 12–7–5 | 29 |
| 25 | December 3 | Chicago | 3–4 | Ottawa | OT | Anderson | 17,171 | 13–7–5 | 31 |
| 26 | December 5 | NY Islanders | 2–3 | Ottawa | OT | Anderson | 17,281 | 14–7–5 | 33 |
| 27 | December 6 | Ottawa | 1–4 | NY Rangers | | Anderson | 18,006 | 14–8–5 | 33 |
| 28 | December 8 | Ottawa | 4–2 | Florida | | Anderson | 11,571 | 15–8–5 | 35 |
| 29 | December 10 | Ottawa | 1–4 | Tampa Bay | | Anderson | 19,092 | 15–9–5 | 35 |
| 30 | December 12 | Ottawa | 1–3 | Montreal | | Anderson | 21,288 | 15–10–5 | 35 |
| 31 | December 14 | Los Angeles | 3–5 | Ottawa | | Anderson | 17,829 | 16–10–5 | 37 |
| 32 | December 16 | Ottawa | 1–2 | Washington | | Hammond | 18,506 | 16–11–5 | 37 |
| 33 | December 18 | San Jose | 2–4 | Ottawa | | Anderson | 17,990 | 17–11–5 | 39 |
| 34 | December 20 | Ottawa | 2–5 | Tampa Bay | | Hammond | 19,092 | 17–12–5 | 39 |
| 35 | December 22 | Ottawa | 1–2 | Florida | SO | Anderson | 14,538 | 17–12–6 | 40 |
| 36 | December 27 | Boston | 1–3 | Ottawa | | Anderson | 20,061 | 18–12–6 | 42 |
| 37 | December 29 | Ottawa | 3–7 | Boston | | Anderson | 17,565 | 18–13–6 | 42 |
| 38 | December 30 | New Jersey | 3–0 | Ottawa | | Hammond | 19,825 | 18–14–6 | 42 |

January: 5–7–0 (Home: 2–3–0; Road: 3–4–0)
| # | Date | Visitor | Score | Home | OT | Decision | Attendance | Record | Pts | Recap |
|---|---|---|---|---|---|---|---|---|---|---|
| 39 | January 3 | Ottawa | 0–3 | Chicago | | Anderson | 22,016 | 18–15–6 | 42 |
| 40 | January 4 | Ottawa | 3–2 | St. Louis | OT | Hammond | 19,152 | 19–15–6 | 44 |
| 41 | January 7 | Florida | 3–2 | Ottawa | | Anderson | 17,150 | 19–16–6 | 44 |
| 42 | January 9 | Boston | 1–2 | Ottawa | OT | Anderson | 19,125 | 20–16–6 | 46 |
| 43 | January 10 | Ottawa | 1–7 | Washington | | Hammond | 18,506 | 20–17–6 | 46 |
| 44 | January 13 | Ottawa | 1–4 | Anaheim | | Anderson | 15,791 | 20–18–6 | 46 |
| 45 | January 16 | Ottawa | 5–3 | Los Angeles | | Anderson | 18,230 | 21–18–6 | 48 |
| 46 | January 18 | Ottawa | 4–3 | San Jose | SO | Anderson | 16,619 | 22–18–6 | 50 |
| 47 | January 21 | Ottawa | 3–6 | New Jersey | | Anderson | 14,772 | 22–19–6 | 50 |
| 48 | January 22 | NY Islanders | 5–2 | Ottawa | | Hammond | 18,305 | 22–20–6 | 50 |
| 49 | January 24 | NY Rangers | 0–3 | Ottawa | | Anderson | 18,940 | 23–20–6 | 52 |
| 50 | January 26 | Buffalo | 3–2 | Ottawa | | Anderson | 16,815 | 23–21–6 | 52 |

February: 7–6–0 (Home: 5–2–0; Road: 2–4–0)
| # | Date | Visitor | Score | Home | OT | Decision | Attendance | Record | Pts | Recap |
|---|---|---|---|---|---|---|---|---|---|---|
| 51 | February 2 | Ottawa | 5–6 | Pittsburgh | | Anderson | 18,420 | 23–22–6 | 52 |
| 52 | February 4 | Edmonton | 7–2 | Ottawa | | Anderson | 18,564 | 23–23–6 | 52 |
| 53 | February 6 | Toronto | 1–6 | Ottawa | | Anderson | 19,379 | 24–23–6 | 54 |
| 54 | February 8 | Tampa Bay | 1–5 | Ottawa | | Anderson | 17,078 | 25–23–6 | 56 |
| 55 | February 10 | Ottawa | 1–3 | Detroit | | Anderson | 20,027 | 25–24–6 | 56 |
| 56 | February 11 | Colorado | 4–3 | Ottawa | | Hammond | 17,632 | 25–25–6 | 56 |
| 57 | February 13 | Ottawa | 2–4 | Columbus | | Anderson | 16,164 | 25–26–6 | 56 |
| 58 | February 16 | Buffalo | 1–2 | Ottawa | SO | Anderson | 15,893 | 26–26–6 | 58 |
| 59 | February 18 | Carolina | 2–4 | Ottawa | | Anderson | 16,994 | 27–26–6 | 60 |
| 60 | February 20 | Detroit | 2–3 | Ottawa | SO | Anderson | 18,930 | 28–26–6 | 62 |
| 61 | February 23 | Ottawa | 4–1 | Edmonton | | Anderson | 16,839 | 29–26–6 | 64 |
| 62 | February 25 | Ottawa | 3–5 | Vancouver | | Anderson | 18,570 | 29–27–6 | 64 |
| 63 | February 27 | Ottawa | 6–4 | Calgary | | Anderson | 19,289 | 30–27–6 | 66 |

March: 6–6–3 (Home: 3–3–2; Road: 3–3–1)
| # | Date | Visitor | Score | Home | OT | Decision | Attendance | Record | Pts | Recap |
|---|---|---|---|---|---|---|---|---|---|---|
| 64 | March 1 | St. Louis | 4–3 | Ottawa | SO | Hammond | 17,207 | 30–27–7 | 67 |
| 65 | March 3 | Tampa Bay | 4–1 | Ottawa | | Hammond | 17,943 | 30–28–7 | 67 |
| 66 | March 5 | Ottawa | 3–2 | Toronto | | Hammond | 19,339 | 31–28–7 | 69 |
| 67 | March 6 | Dallas | 2–1 | Ottawa | | Hammond | 19,419 | 31–29–7 | 69 |
| 68 | March 8 | Ottawa | 3–4 | Carolina | SO | Hammond | 10,743 | 31–29–8 | 70 |
| 69 | March 10 | Ottawa | 2–6 | Florida | | Anderson | 15,051 | 31–30–8 | 70 |
| 70 | March 12 | Toronto | 0–4 | Ottawa | | Anderson | 18,557 | 32–30–8 | 72 |
| 71 | March 15 | Minnesota | 2–3 | Ottawa | OT | Anderson | 18,966 | 33–30–8 | 74 |
| 72 | March 18 | Ottawa | 1–3 | Buffalo | | Anderson | 19,070 | 33–31–8 | 74 |
| 73 | March 19 | Montreal | 0–5 | Ottawa | | Hammond | 19,722 | 34–31–8 | 76 |
| 74 | March 22 | Washington | 4–2 | Ottawa | | Anderson | 19,313 | 34–32–8 | 76 |
| 75 | March 23 | Ottawa | 1–3 | NY Islanders | | Hammond | 13,837 | 34–33–8 | 76 |
| 76 | March 26 | Anaheim | 4–3 | Ottawa | OT | Anderson | 18,162 | 34–33–9 | 77 |
| 77 | March 30 | Ottawa | 2–1 | Winnipeg | | Hammond | 15,294 | 35–33–9 | 79 |
| 78 | March 31 | Ottawa | 3–2 | Minnesota | | Anderson | 19,032 | 36–33–9 | 81 |

April: 2–2–0 (Home: 1–1–0; Road: 1–1–0)
| # | Date | Visitor | Score | Home | OT | Decision | Attendance | Record | Pts | Recap |
|---|---|---|---|---|---|---|---|---|---|---|
| 79 | April 2 | Ottawa | 2–3 | Philadelphia | | Hammond | 19,578 | 36–34–9 | 81 |
| 80 | April 5 | Pittsburgh | 5–3 | Ottawa | | Hammond | 19,284 | 36–35–9 | 81 |
| 81 | April 7 | Florida | 1–3 | Ottawa | | Anderson | 19,165 | 37–35–9 | 83 |
| 82 | April 9 | Ottawa | 6–1 | Boston | | Hammond | 17,565 | 38–35–9 | 85 |

Legend: Win (2 points) Loss (0 points) Overtime/shootout loss (1 point)

== Players ==
=== Statistics ===
Final stats

Scoring

Regular season
| Player | GP | G | A | Pts | +/− | PIM |
|---|---|---|---|---|---|---|
| Erik Karlsson | 82 | 16 | 66 | 82 | −2 | 50 |
| Mark Stone | 75 | 23 | 38 | 61 | -4 | 38 |
| Mike Hoffman | 78 | 29 | 30 | 59 | 1 | 18 |
| Bobby Ryan | 81 | 22 | 34 | 56 | −9 | 28 |
| Mika Zibanejad | 81 | 21 | 30 | 51 | −2 | 18 |
| Jean-Gabriel Pageau | 82 | 19 | 24 | 43 | 17 | 26 |
| Zack Smith | 81 | 25 | 11 | 36 | 16 | 80 |
| Kyle Turris | 57 | 13 | 17 | 30 | −15 | 32 |
| Cody Ceci | 75 | 10 | 16 | 26 | 9 | 18 |
| Curtis Lazar | 76 | 6 | 14 | 20 | −1 | 18 |
| Alex Chiasson | 77 | 8 | 6 | 14 | 2 | 45 |
| Chris Wideman | 64 | 6 | 7 | 13 | 4 | 34 |
| Chris Neil | 80 | 5 | 8 | 13 | −3 | 165 |
| Marc Methot | 69 | 5 | 7 | 12 | 12 | 34 |
| Shane Prince‡ | 42 | 3 | 9 | 12 | 2 | 6 |
| Milan Michalek‡ | 32 | 6 | 4 | 10 | 1 | 12 |
| Ryan Dzingel | 30 | 3 | 6 | 9 | 4 | 11 |
| Dion Phaneuf† | 20 | 1 | 7 | 8 | −3 | 23 |
| Nick Paul | 24 | 2 | 3 | 5 | −3 | 6 |
| Patrick Wiercioch | 52 | 0 | 5 | 5 | 2 | 24 |
| Max McCormick | 20 | 2 | 2 | 4 | −4 | 37 |
| David Dziurzynski | 14 | 1 | 3 | 4 | −4 | 9 |
| Jared Cowen‡ | 37 | 0 | 4 | 4 | 7 | 16 |
| Matt Puempel | 26 | 2 | 1 | 3 | −3 | 9 |
| Buddy Robinson | 3 | 1 | 1 | 2 | 2 | 4 |
| Mark Borowiecki | 63 | 1 | 1 | 2 | −4 | 107 |
| Fredrik Claesson | 16 | 0 | 2 | 2 | −6 | 2 |
| Phil Varone† | 1 | 0 | 1 | 1 | 1 | 0 |
| Ben Harpur | 5 | 0 | 1 | 1 | 1 | 2 |
| Scott Gomez† | 13 | 0 | 1 | 1 | −3 | 2 |
| Michael Kostka | 15 | 0 | 1 | 1 | 6 | 4 |
| Clarke MacArthur | 4 | 0 | 0 | 0 | −1 | 0 |
| Colin Greening‡ | 1 | 0 | 0 | 0 | 0 | 0 |

Goaltenders

Regular season
| Player | GP | GS | TOI | W | L | OT | GA | GAA | SA | SV% | SO | G | A | PIM |
|---|---|---|---|---|---|---|---|---|---|---|---|---|---|---|
| Craig Anderson | 60 | 60 | 3,477:08 | 31 | 23 | 5 | 161 | 2.78 | 1,915 | .916 | 4 | 0 | 2 | 0 |
| Andrew Hammond | 24 | 21 | 1,382:19 | 7 | 11 | 4 | 61 | 2.65 | 712 | .914 | 1 | 0 | 0 | 2 |
| Matthew O'Connor | 1 | 1 | 58:02 | 0 | 1 | 0 | 3 | 3.10 | 34 | .912 | 0 | 0 | 0 | 0 |
| Chris Driedger | 1 | 0 | 31:49 | 0 | 0 | 0 | 0 | 0.00 | 11 | 1.000 | 0 | 0 | 0 | 0 |

^{†}Denotes player spent time with another team before joining the Senators. Stats reflect time with the Senators only.
^{‡}No longer with team.
Bold/italics denotes team leader in that category.

=== Awards ===
Regular season
| Player | Award | Awarded |
|---|---|---|
| Erik Karlsson | NHL All-Star game selection | January 6, 2016 |
| Erik Karlsson | NHL Second Star of the Week | February 8, 2016 |
| Craig Anderson | NHL Third Star of the Week | February 22, 2016 |

=== Milestones ===
| Player | Milestone | Date |
|---|---|---|
| Kyle Turris | 400th NHL game | October 10, 2015 |
| Matt O'Connor | 1st NHL game 1st NHL start | October 11, 2015 |
| Milan Michalek | 700th NHL game | October 11, 2015 |
| Erik Karlsson | 400th NHL game | October 11, 2015 |
| Chris Wideman | 1st NHL game | October 17, 2015 |
| Chris Neil | 900th NHL game | October 22, 2015 |
| Max McCormick | 1st NHL game | October 22, 2015 |
| Kyle Turris | 100th NHL goal | October 31, 2015 |
| Bobby Ryan | 400th NHL point | October 31, 2015 |
| Craig Anderson | 100th win as a member of the Ottawa Senators | November 3, 2015 |
| Jean-Gabriel Pageau | 100th NHL game | November 5, 2015 |
| Chris Wideman | 1st NHL goal 1st NHL point | November 7, 2015 |
| Shane Prince | 1st NHL goal | November 25, 2015 |
| Marc Methot | 100th NHL point | November 28, 2015 |
| David Dziurzynski | 1st NHL assist | December 6, 2015 |
| Mark Stone | 100th NHL point | December 14, 2015 |
| Ryan Dzingel | 1st NHL game | December 22, 2015 |
| Max McCormick | 1st NHL assist 1st NHL point | December 29, 2015 |
| Fredrik Claesson | 1st NHL game | December 30, 2015 |
| Curtis Lazar | 100th NHL game | December 30, 2015 |
| Alex Chiasson | 200th NHL game | December 30, 2015 |
| Bobby Ryan | 200th NHL goal | January 4, 2016 |
| Chris Wideman | 1st NHL assist | January 4, 2016 |
| Max McCormick | 1st NHL goal | January 7, 2016 |
| Craig Anderson | 200th NHL win | January 16, 2016 |
| Patrick Wiercioch | 200th NHL game | January 24, 2016 |
| Ryan Dzingel | 1st NHL assist 1st NHL point | February 6, 2016 |
| Ryan Dzingel | 1st NHL goal | February 16, 2016 |
| Nick Paul | 1st NHL game | February 16, 2016 |
| Nick Paul | 1st NHL assist 1st NHL point | February 18, 2016 |
| Nick Paul | 1st NHL goal | February 23, 2016 |
| Zack Smith | 100th NHL point | February 27, 2016 |
| Mike Hoffman | 100th NHL point | February 27, 2016 |
| Marc Methot | 500th NHL game | March 6, 2016 |
| Bobby Ryan | 600th NHL game | March 23, 2016 |
| Cody Ceci | 200th NHL game | March 30, 2016 |
| Ben Harpur | 1st NHL game | March 31, 2016 |
| Buddy Robinson | 1st NHL game | April 5, 2016 |
| Erik Karlsson | 100th NHL goal | April 5, 2016 |
| Ben Harpur | 1st NHL assist 1st NHL point | April 5, 2016 |
| Fredrik Claesson | 1st NHL assist 1st NHL point | April 5, 2016 |
| Buddy Robinson | 1st NHL goal 1st NHL point | April 7, 2016 |
| Zack Smith | 400th NHL game | April 9, 2016 |
| Buddy Robinson | 1st NHL assist | April 9, 2016 |
| Team | Milestone | Date |
| Ottawa Senators | 5000th goal in franchise history (Scored by Jean-Gabriel Pageau) | October 11, 2015 |
| Ottawa Senators | 800th win | December 14, 2015 |
| Ottawa Senators | 1800th game | February 20, 2016 |

=== Records ===
| Team | Record | Date |
|---|---|---|
| Ottawa Senators | Franchise record for most shots allowed in one period (27) | December 12, 2015 |
| Player | Record | Date |
| Mika Zibanejad | Franchise record for scoring the quickest hat-trick (2:38) | February 27, 2016 |

=== Transactions ===
Trades
| Date | Details | | Reference |
|---|---|---|---|
| June 26, 2015 | To Buffalo Sabres Robin Lehner; David Legwand | To Ottawa Senators NYI's 1st-round pick (21st overall) in 2015 | |
| June 27, 2015 | To Edmonton Oilers Eric Gryba | To Ottawa Senators Travis Ewanyk; PIT's 4th-round pick (107th overall) in 2015 | |
| June 27, 2015 | To New Jersey Devils DAL's 2nd-round pick (42nd overall) in 2015; 4th-round pick in 2016 | To Ottawa Senators 2nd-round pick (36th overall) in 2015 | |
| January 14, 2016 | To Nashville Predators Patrick Mullen | To Ottawa Senators Conor Allen | |
| February 9, 2016 | To Toronto Maple Leafs Jared Cowen; Milan Michalek; Colin Greening; Tobias Lindberg; 2nd-round pick in 2017 | To Ottawa Senators Dion Phaneuf; Matt Frattin; Casey Bailey; Ryan Rupert; Cody Donaghey | |
| February 27, 2016 | To Buffalo Sabres Eric O'Dell; Cole Schneider; Alex Guptill; Michael Sdao | To Ottawa Senators Jason Akeson; Phil Varone; Jérôme Gauthier-Leduc | |
| February 29, 2016 | To Minnesota Wild Conor Allen | To Ottawa Senators Michael Keranen | |
| February 29, 2016 | To New York Islanders Shane Prince; 7th-round pick in 2016 | To Ottawa Senators 3rd-round pick in 2016 | |

Free agents acquired
| Date | Player | Former team | Contract terms (in U.S. dollars) | Ref |
| July 1, 2015 | Eric O'Dell | Winnipeg Jets | One-year, two-way, $700,000 | |
| July 1, 2015 | Zack Stortini | Philadelphia Flyers | Two-year, two-way, $1.2 million | |
| July 1, 2015 | Michael Kostka | New York Rangers | One-year, two-way, $800,000 | |
| September 28, 2015 | Mark Fraser | New Jersey Devils | One-year, two-way, $800,000 | |
| March 2, 2016 | Scott Gomez | Rochester Americans | One-year, $575,000 | |
| May 24, 2016 | Tom Pyatt | Geneve-Servette HC | One-year, two-way $800,000 | |

Free agents lost
| Date | Player | New team | Contract terms (in U.S. dollars) | Ref |
| July 1, 2015 | Erik Condra | Tampa Bay Lightning | 3 years, $3.75 million | |
| July 1, 2015 | Derek Grant | Calgary Flames | 1 year, two-way, $700,000 | |
| July 2, 2015 | Alex Grant | Arizona Coyotes | 1-year, two-way, $600,000 | |

Player signings
| Date | Player | Contract terms (in U.S. dollars) | Ref |
| June 29, 2015 | Chris Wideman | One-year, two-way, $600,000 | |
| June 30, 2015 | Patrick Mullen | One-year, two-way, $600,000 | |
| July 2, 2015 | Cole Schneider | One-year, two-way, $700,000 | |
| July 15, 2015 | Shane Prince | One-year, two-way, $700,000 | |
| July 26, 2015 | Alex Chiasson | One-year, $1.2 million | |
| August 3, 2015 | Mike Hoffman | One-year, $2 million | |
| September 30, 2015 | Thomas Chabot | Three-year, entry-level contract | |
| February 24, 2016 | Chris Wideman | Two-year, $1.6 million contract extension | |
| February 27, 2016 | Chris Neil | One-year, $1.5 million contract extension | |
| March 15, 2016 | Francis Perron | Three-year, entry-level contract | |
| April 1, 2016 | Macoy Erkamps | Three-year, entry-level contract | |
| April 5, 2016 | Andreas Englund | Three-year, entry-level contract | |
| June 23, 2016 | Buddy Robinson | One-year | |

Suspensions/fines
| Player | Reason | Length | Salary | Date issued |
|---|---|---|---|---|
| Mark Stone | An illegal check to the head of Detroit Red Wings forward Landon Ferraro during NHL game no. 158 in Ottawa on October 31 | 2 games | $37,634.40 | November 2, 2015 |
| Zack Smith | Diving/embellishment during NHL game no. 422 in Tampa Bay on December 10 | – | $2,000.00 | December 17, 2015 |

== Draft picks ==
Below are the Ottawa Senators' selections at the 2015 NHL entry draft, held on June 26–27, 2015, at the BB&T Center in Sunrise, Florida. The day before the draft, the Senators traded goaltender Robin Lehner and David Legwand to the Buffalo Sabres to pick up a second first-round pick. On the second day of the draft, the Senators traded with the New Jersey Devils, moving up from the 42nd overall pick to the 36th overall pick to get Gabriel Gagne. The Senators then traded Eric Gryba to the Edmonton Oilers to pick up a player and the fourth-round pick of the Toronto Maple Leafs (107th overall) to select Christian Wolanin.

| Round | Overall | Player | Position | Nationality | Club team |
|---|---|---|---|---|---|
| 1 | 18 | Thomas Chabot | Defence | Canada | Saint John Sea Dogs (QMJHL) |
| 1 | 21^{a} | Colin White | Centre | United States | U.S. National Team Development Program (USHL) |
| 2 | 36^{b} | Gabriel Gagne | Right wing | Canada | Victoriaville Tigres (QMJHL) |
| 2 | 48 | Filip Chlapik | Centre | Czech Republic | Charlottetown Islanders (QMJHL) |
| 4 | 107^{c} | Christian Wolanin | Defence | Canada | Muskegon Lumberjacks (USHL) |
| 4 | 109 | Filip Ahl | Left wing | Sweden | HV71 (J20 SuperElit) |
| 5 | 139 | Christian Jaros | Defence | Slovakia | Lulea HF (J20 SuperElit) |
| 7 | 199 | Joel Daccord | Goaltender | United States | Cushing Academy (USHS–MA) |

Draft notes

- ^{a} The New York Islanders' first-round pick went to the Ottawa Senators as the result of a trade on June 26, 2015 that sent Robin Lehner and David Legwand to Buffalo in exchange for this pick.
  Buffalo previously acquired this pick as the result of a trade on October 27, 2013 that sent Thomas Vanek to New York in exchange for Matt Moulson, a second-round pick in 2015 and this pick (being conditional at the time of the trade). The condition – Buffalo will receive a first-round pick in 2014 or 2015 at New York's choice – was converted on May 22, 2014 when the Islanders elected to keep their 2014 first-round pick.
- ^{b} The New Jersey Devils' second-round pick went to the Ottawa Senators as the result of a trade on June 27, 2015 that sent Dallas' second-round pick in 2015 (42nd overall) and a conditional fourth-round pick in 2015 or 2016 to New Jersey in exchange for this pick.
- The Ottawa Senators' third-round pick went to the Edmonton Oilers as the result of a trade on March 5, 2014 that sent Ales Hemsky to Ottawa in exchange for a fifth-round pick in 2014 and this pick.
- ^{c} The Pittsburgh Penguins' fourth-round pick went to the Ottawa Senators as the result of a trade on June 27, 2015 that sent Eric Gryba to Edmonton in exchange for Travis Ewanyk and this pick.
  Edmonton previously acquired this pick as the result of a trade on June 27, 2015 that sent Martin Marincin to Toronto in exchange for Brad Ross and this pick.
  Toronto previously acquired this pick as the result of a trade on February 25, 2015 that sent Daniel Winnik to Pittsburgh in exchange for Zach Sill, a second-round pick in 2016 and this pick.
- The Ottawa Senators' sixth-round pick went to the Carolina Hurricanes as the result of a trade on December 18, 2014 that sent Jay Harrison to Winnipeg in exchange for this pick. Winnipeg previously acquired this pick as the result of a trade on June 28, 2014 that sent a seventh-round pick in 2014 to Ottawa in exchange for this pick.
