= 2015–16 Toronto Maple Leafs season =

NHL hockey team season

2015–16 Toronto Maple Leafs
- Division: 8th Atlantic
- Conference: 16th Eastern
- 2015–16 record: 29–42–11
- Home record: 14–18–9
- Road record: 15–24–2
- Goals for: 198
- Goals against: 246

Team information
- General manager: Lou Lamoriello
- Coach: Mike Babcock
- Captain: Dion Phaneuf (Oct. – Feb.); Vacant (Feb. – Apr.)
- Alternate captains: Tyler Bozak; Matt Hunwick; Leo Komarov (Feb. – Apr.) (Note: Komarov was handed alternate captaincy following a trade on February 9, 2016 that sent captain Dion Phaneuf to the Ottawa Senators.) (Note: During injury to Tyler Bozak or Matt Hunwick, alternate captaincy was handed to Roman Polak. Following Polak's departure via trade on February 22, Brad Boyes assumed responsibilities. Both Michael Grabner, P. A. Parenteau and Brooks Laich have served as alternate captains at least once.)
- Arena: Air Canada Centre
- Average attendance: 19,158
- Minor league affiliates: Toronto Marlies (AHL); Orlando Solar Bears (ECHL)

Team leaders
- Goals: P. A. Parenteau (20)
- Assists: Nazem Kadri (28)
- Points: Nazem Kadri (45)
- Penalty minutes: Nazem Kadri (73)
- Plus/minus: Roman Polak (+8)
- Wins: Jonathan Bernier (12)
- Goals against average: Jonathan Bernier (2.88)

The 2015–16 Toronto Maple Leafs season was the 99th season for the National Hockey League (NHL) franchise that was established on November 22, 1917. The season officially began its regular games on October 7, 2015, with a 3–1 loss against the Montreal Canadiens.

Despite stretches of strong play, with the Maple Leafs at one point being within a few points of a playoff spot, they broke the franchise record for most losses in a season with 53 (the previous record was 52 in 1984–85). However, the previous record was set when there were only 80 games per season (two have since been added, bringing the total games played yearly to 82 per team). Due to the point awarded for overtime and shootout losses, the Leafs finished the season with 69 points, one more than the previous season. Despite the improved record, the Maple Leafs finished last overall in the NHL standings for the first time since the 1984–85 season and missed the playoffs for the third year in a row for the first time since the 2009–10 to 2011–12 seasons.

On July 1, 2015, the Maple Leafs were part of a blockbuster, multi-player deal that centred on Phil Kessel moving to the Pittsburgh Penguins, with one of the key pieces for Toronto being prospect Kasperi Kapanen. Kessel would be a central piece in the Penguins' Stanley Cup win later that season. Months later, another significant trade occurred when captain Dion Phaneuf plus four other players were traded to Ottawa Senators in exchange for four players plus a second round draft pick in 2017. A trade like this was seen as substantial due to the divisional Battle of Ontario rivalry and the NHL salary cap, which typically prevents more than a few players from moving at once.

On April 30, 2016, it was announced that the Leafs had won the draft lottery, and would receive the first overall pick in the 2016 NHL entry draft. Auston Matthews was subsequently selected first overall. This was the last season the Leafs missed the playoffs until 2026.

== Off-season ==
The Maple Leafs made numerous personnel changes prior to the start of the season. Mike Babcock and Lou Lamoriello were hired as head coach and general manager, respectively, replacing Dave Nonis and interim head coach Peter Horachek. Additionally, in an effort to bring in new personnel, coaches Steve Spott, Chris Dennis, Rick St. Croix; Director of Player Development Jim Hughes; and Director of Pro Scouting Steve Kasper, as well as Rob Cowie, strength and conditioning coach Anthony Belza, and 18 other scouts were fired. The team would find replacements for these members throughout the off season.

The 2015 NHL entry draft was held between July 26 and 27, and the Maple Leafs made a total of 9 selections, while also acquiring defenceman Martin Marincin.

Following the draft, the Leafs made a number of moves during the free agency period, signing players such as P. A. Parenteau, Mark Arcobello, and Shawn Matthias to short-term contracts. The most noteworthy move came in a blockbuster deal that sent winger Phil Kessel to the Pittsburgh Penguins, along with Tim Erixon, Tyler Biggs and a conditional second-round draft pick, in exchange for Kasperi Kapanen, Nick Spaling, Scott Harrington, and a conditional set of draft picks.

As the off-season went on, the team would sign Devin Setoguchi, Curtis Glencross, Brad Boyes, and Mark Fraser to professional try out contracts. Out of these four, Boyes was the only one to sign a contract, inking a one-year deal, while the others were released.

For a complete list of on-ice off-season moves, please see Transactions.

== Standings ==
Atlantic Division
Pos	Team	GP	W	L	OTL	ROW	GF	GA	GD	Pts
1	y – Florida Panthers	82	47	26	9	40	239	203	+36	103
2	x – Tampa Bay Lightning	82	46	31	5	43	227	201	+26	97
3	x – Detroit Red Wings	82	41	30	11	39	211	224	−13	93
4	Boston Bruins	82	42	31	9	38	240	230	+10	93
5	Ottawa Senators	82	38	35	9	32	236	247	−11	85
6	Montreal Canadiens	82	38	38	6	33	221	236	−15	82
7	Buffalo Sabres	82	35	36	11	33	201	222	−21	81
8	Toronto Maple Leafs	82	29	42	11	23	198	246	−48	69

Source: National Hockey League
x – Clinched playoff spot; y – Clinched division

Eastern Conference Wild Card
Pos	Div	Team	GP	W	L	OTL	ROW	GF	GA	GD	Pts
1	ME	x – New York Islanders	82	45	27	10	40	232	216	+16	100
2	ME	x – Philadelphia Flyers	82	41	27	14	38	214	218	−4	96
3	AT	Boston Bruins	82	42	31	9	38	240	230	+10	93
4	ME	Carolina Hurricanes	82	35	31	16	33	198	226	−28	86
5	AT	Ottawa Senators	82	38	35	9	32	236	247	−11	85
6	ME	New Jersey Devils	82	38	36	8	36	184	208	−24	84
7	AT	Montreal Canadiens	82	38	38	6	33	221	236	−15	82
8	AT	Buffalo Sabres	82	35	36	11	33	201	222	−21	81
9	ME	Columbus Blue Jackets	82	34	40	8	28	219	252	−33	76
10	AT	Toronto Maple Leafs	82	29	42	11	23	198	246	−48	69

Source: National Hockey League
x – Clinched playoff spot

== Record vs opponents ==
Eastern Conference												Western Conference					
Atlantic Division							Metropolitan Division					Central Division			Pacific Division		
Team	Home			Away			Team	Home		Away		Team	Home	Away	Team	Home	Away
Boston	3–4*	1–3		0–2	2–3	4–3*	Carolina	0–1*	3–1	2–1*		Chicago	1–4	2–7	Anaheim	6–5*	4–0
Buffalo	3–4*	4–1		1–2*	1–4		Columbus	1–3	1–5	6–3		Colorado	5–1	7–4	Arizona	3–4	2–3
Detroit	1–2*	2–3		0–4	1–0		New Jersey	3–2*	3–2*	1–5		Dallas	4–1	3–2	Calgary	5–2	3–4
Florida	1–4	3–4		1–5	5–2		N.Y. Islanders	3–6	4–3*	3–1		Minnesota	1–2	0–1	Edmonton	3–0	2–5
Montreal	1–3	2–3*		3–5	1–4		N.Y. Rangers	2–4		1–3	3–4	Nashville	2–3	2–1*	Los Angeles	5–0	1–2
Ottawa	4–5*	2–3		1–6	0–4		Philadelphia	4–5*		3–2	4–3*	St. Louis	4–1	4–1	San Jose	4–5*	0–7
Tampa Bay	4–5*	1–2	4–1	0–1	0–3		Pittsburgh	0–4		1–2	3–2*	Winnipeg	2–4	1–6	Vancouver	4–2	5–2
							Washington	2–4		2–3*	2–3						
Records	2–7–6			3–11–1				4–6–2		6–5–1			3–4–0	4–3–0		5–1–1	2–5–0
Division	5–18–7							10–11–3					7–7–0			7–6–1	
Conference	15–29–10 (Home: 6–13–8; Away: 9–16–2)												14–13–1 (Home: 8–5–1; Away: 6–8–0)				
Overall	29–42–11 (Home: 14–18–9; Away: 15–24–2)																

* game decided in overtime or shoot-out

== Schedule and results ==
=== Pre-season ===
2015 preseason game log: 3–5–0 (Home: 1–3–0; Road: 2–2–0)
#	Date	Visitor	Score	Home	OT	Decision	Attendance	Record	Recap
1^{[A]}	September 21	Ottawa	1–4	Toronto		Bernier	16,734	1–0–0	Recap
2^{[A]}	September 21	Toronto	4–3	Ottawa	OT	Sparks	15,542	2–0–0	Recap
3	September 22	Toronto	2–1	Montreal	OT	Sparks	21,287	3–0–0	Recap
4	September 25	Buffalo	6–4	Toronto		Bernier	17,403	3–1–0	Recap
5	September 26	Montreal	1–0	Toronto		Reimer	17,992	3–2–0	Recap
6	September 29	Toronto	0–4	Buffalo		Bernier	17,357	3–3–0	Recap
7	October 2	Toronto	2–4	Detroit		Reimer	19,149	3–4–0	Recap
8	October 3	Detroit	2–1	Toronto		Bernier	17,879	3–5–0	Recap
^{A} – indicates split-squad game.

=== Regular season ===
2015–16 game log

October: 1–7–2, 4 points (Home: 0–3–1; Road: 1–4–1)
#	Date	Visitor	Score	Home	OT	Decision	Attendance	Record	Pts	Recap
1	October 7	Montreal	3–1	Toronto		Bernier (0–1–0)	19,241	0–1–0	0	Recap
2	October 9	Toronto	0–4	Detroit		Bernier (0–2–0)	20,027	0–2–0	0	Recap
3	October 10	Ottawa	5–4	Toronto	SO	Reimer (0–0–1)	19,187	0–2–1	1	Recap
4	October 16	Toronto	6–3	Columbus		Reimer (1–0–1)	13,885	1–2–1	3	Recap
5	October 17	Toronto	1–2	Pittsburgh		Bernier (0–3–0)	18,650	1–3–1	3	Recap
6	October 21	Toronto	1–2	Buffalo	SO	Bernier (0–3–1)	17,762	1–3–2	4	Recap
7	October 24	Toronto	3–5	Montreal		Bernier (0–4–1)	21,288	1–4–2	4	Recap
8	October 26	Arizona	4–3	Toronto		Reimer (1–1–1)	18,944	1–5–2	4	Recap
9	October 30	Toronto	1–3	NY Rangers		Bernier (0–5–1)	18,006	1–6–2	4	Recap
10	October 31	Pittsburgh	4–0	Toronto		Bernier (0–6–1)	19,197	1–7–2	4	Recap

November: 7–4–3, 17 points (Home: 4–2–2; Road: 3–2–1)
#	Date	Visitor	Score	Home	OT	Decision	Attendance	Record	Pts	Recap
11	November 2	Dallas	1–4	Toronto		Reimer (2–1–1)	19,087	2–7–2	6	Recap
12	November 4	Winnipeg	4–2	Toronto		Reimer (2–2–1)	19,113	2–8–2	6	Recap
13	November 6	Detroit	2–1	Toronto	OT	Reimer (2–2–2)	19,680	2–8–3	7	Recap
14	November 7	Toronto	2–3	Washington	SO	Reimer (2–2–3)	18,506	2–8–4	8	Recap
15	November 10	Toronto	3–2	Dallas		Reimer (3–2–3)	18,266	3–8–4	10	Recap
16	November 12	Toronto	2–1	Nashville	SO	Reimer (4–2–3)	17,231	4–8–4	12	Recap
17	November 14	Vancouver	2–4	Toronto		Reimer (5–2–3)	19,798	5–8–4	14	Recap
18	November 15	Toronto	3–4	NY Rangers		Bernier (0–7–1)	18,006	5–9–4	14	Recap
19	November 17	Colorado	1–5	Toronto		Reimer (6–2–3)	19,238	6–9–4	16	Recap
20	November 20	Toronto	2–1	Carolina	SO	Reimer (7–2–3)	10,327	7–9–4	18	Recap
21	November 21	Toronto	0–2	Boston		Reimer (7–3–3)	17,565	7–10–4	18	Recap
22	November 23	Boston	4–3	Toronto	SO	Reimer (7–3–4)	19,609	7–10–5	19	Recap
23	November 28	Washington	4–2	Toronto		Bernier (0–8–1)	19,053	7–11–5	19	Recap
24	November 30	Edmonton	0–3	Toronto		Sparks (1–0–0)	19,559	8–11–5	21	Recap

December: 6–4–2, 14 points (Home: 2–1–2; Road: 4–3–0)
#	Date	Visitor	Score	Home	OT	Decision	Attendance	Record	Pts	Recap
25	December 2	Toronto	1–6	Winnipeg		Sparks (1–1–0)	15,294	8–12–5	21	Recap
26	December 3	Toronto	0–1	Minnesota		Reimer (7–4–4)	18,880	8–13–5	21	Recap
27	December 5	Toronto	4–1	St. Louis		Sparks (2–1–0)	18,698	9–13–5	23	Recap
28	December 8	New Jersey	2–3	Toronto	SO	Sparks (3–1–0)	19,043	10–13–5	25	Recap
29	December 15	Tampa Bay	5–4	Toronto	OT	Bernier (0–8–2)	18,989	10–13–6	26	Recap
30	December 17	San Jose	5–4	Toronto	OT	Bernier (0–8–3)	18,966	10–13–7	27	Recap
31	December 19	Los Angeles	0–5	Toronto		Bernier (1–8–3)	19,362	11–13–7	29	Recap
32	December 21	Toronto	7–4	Colorado		Bernier (2–8–3)	16,084	12–13–7	31	Recap
33	December 22	Toronto	2–3	Arizona		Bernier (2–9–3)	12,234	12–14–7	31	Recap
34	December 27	Toronto	3–1	NY Islanders		Bernier (3–9–3)	15,795	13–14–7	33	Recap
35	December 29	NY Islanders	6–3	Toronto		Bernier (3–10–3)	19,899	13–15–7	33	Recap
36	December 30	Toronto	3–2	Pittsburgh	SO	Bernier (4–10–3)	18,662	14–15–7	35	Recap

January: 3–7–2, 8 points (Home: 1–2–2; Road: 2–5–0)
#	Date	Visitor	Score	Home	OT	Decision	Attendance	Record	Pts	Recap
37	January 2	St. Louis	1–4	Toronto		Bernier (5–10–3)	19,221	15–15–7	37	Recap
38	January 6	Toronto	4–0	Anaheim		Bernier (6–10–3)	16,283	16–15–7	39	Recap
39	January 7	Toronto	1–2	Los Angeles		Reimer (7–5–4)	18,230	16–16–7	39	Recap
40	January 9	Toronto	0–7	San Jose		Bernier (6–11–3)	17,281	16–17–7	39	Recap
41	January 13	Columbus	3–1	Toronto		Reimer (7–6–4)	18,903	16–18–7	39	Recap
42	January 15	Chicago	4–1	Toronto		Reimer (7–7–4)	20,049	16–19–7	39	Recap
43	January 16	Toronto	2–3	Boston		Bernier (6–12–3)	17,565	16–20–7	39	Recap
44	January 19	Toronto	3–2	Philadelphia		Reimer (8–7–4)	19,319	17–20–7	41	Recap
45	January 21	Carolina	1–0	Toronto	OT	Reimer (8–7–5)	18,981	17–20–8	42	Recap
46	January 23	Montreal	3–2	Toronto	SO	Reimer (8–7–6)	19,807	17–20–9	43	Recap
47	January 26	Toronto	1–5	Florida		Reimer (8–8–6)	14,585	17–21–9	43	Recap
48	January 27	Toronto	0–1	Tampa Bay		Bernier (6–13–3)	19,092	17–22–9	43	Recap

February: 4–8–1, 9 points (Home: 2–3–1; Road: 2–5–0)
#	Date	Visitor	Score	Home	OT	Decision	Attendance	Record	Pts	Recap
49	February 2	Toronto	4–3	Boston	OT	Reimer (9–8–6)	17,565	18–22–9	45	Recap
50	February 4	New Jersey	2–3	Toronto	SO	Reimer (10–8–6)	18,947	19–22–9	47	Recap
51	February 6	Toronto	1–6	Ottawa		Reimer (10–9–6)	19,379	19–23–9	47	Recap
52	February 9	Toronto	3–4	Calgary		Reimer (10–10–6)	19,289	19–24–9	47	Recap
53	February 11	Toronto	2–5	Edmonton		Bernier (6–14–3)	16,839	19–25–9	47	Recap
54	February 13	Toronto	5–2	Vancouver		Reimer (11–10–6)	18,570	20–25–9	49	Recap
55	February 15	Toronto	2–7	Chicago		Reimer (11–11–6)	21,767	20–26–9	49	Recap
56	February 18	NY Rangers	4–2	Toronto		Bernier (6–15–3)	18,952	20–27–9	49	Recap
57	February 20	Philadelphia	5–4	Toronto	OT	Reimer (11–11–7)	19,060	20–27–10	50	Recap
58	February 23	Nashville	3–2	Toronto		Reimer (11–12–7)	18,844	20–28–10	50	Recap
59	February 25	Carolina	1–3	Toronto		Bernier (7–15–3)	18,862	21–28–10	52	Recap
60	February 27	Toronto	1–4	Montreal		Bernier (7–16–3)	21,288	21–29–10	52	Recap
61	February 29	Tampa Bay	2–1	Toronto		Sparks (3–2–0)	18,933	21–30–10	52	Recap

March: 7–8–1, 15 points (Home: 5–4–1; Road: 2–4–0)
#	Date	Visitor	Score	Home	OT	Decision	Attendance	Record	Pts	Recap
62	March 2	Toronto	2–3	Washington		Bernier (7–17–3)	18,506	21–31–10	52	Recap
63	March 3	Minnesota	2–1	Toronto		Sparks (3–3–0)	18,915	21–32–10	52	Recap
64	March 5	Ottawa	3–2	Toronto		Bernier (7–18–3)	19,339	21–33–10	52	Recap
65	March 7	Buffalo	4–3	Toronto	SO	Sparks (3–3–1)	18,950	21–33–11	53	Recap
66	March 9	NY Islanders	3–4	Toronto	SO	Sparks (4–3–1)	18,889	22–33–11	55	Recap
67	March 12	Toronto	0–4	Ottawa		Sparks (4–4–1)	18,557	22–34–11	55	Recap
68	March 13	Toronto	1–0	Detroit		Bernier (8–18–3)	20,027	23–34–11	57	Recap
69	March 15	Tampa Bay	1–4	Toronto		Bernier (9–18–3)	18,874	24–34–11	59	Recap
70	March 17	Florida	4–1	Toronto		Bernier (9–19–3)	18,922	24–35–11	59	Recap
71	March 19	Buffalo	1–4	Toronto		Sparks (5–4–1)	18,829	25–35–11	61	Recap
72	March 21	Calgary	2–5	Toronto		Bernier (10–19–3)	19,069	26–35–11	63	Recap
73	March 24	Anaheim	5–6	Toronto	OT	Sparks (6–4–1)	18,935	27–35–11	65	Recap
74	March 26	Boston	3–1	Toronto		Bernier (10–20–3)	19,185	27–36–11	65	Recap
75	March 28	Toronto	0–3	Tampa Bay		Sparks (6–5–1)	19,092	27–37–11	65	Recap
76	March 29	Toronto	5–2	Florida		Bernier (11–20–3)	16,724	28–37–11	67	Recap
77	March 31	Toronto	1–4	Buffalo		Sparks (6–6–1)	18,873	28–38–11	67	Recap

April: 1–4–0, 2 points (Home: 0–3–0; Road: 1–1–0)
#	Date	Visitor	Score	Home	OT	Decision	Attendance	Record	Pts	Recap
78	April 2	Detroit	3–2	Toronto		Sparks (6–7–1)	19,371	28–39–11	67	Recap
79	April 4	Florida	4–3	Toronto		Bernier (11–21–3)	18,846	28–40–11	67	Recap
80	April 6	Columbus	5–1	Toronto		Sparks (6–8–1)	18,837	28–41–11	67	Recap
81	April 7	Toronto	4–3	Philadelphia	OT	Bernier (12–21–3)	19,674	29–41–11	69	Recap
82	April 9	Toronto	1–5	New Jersey		Sparks (6–9–1)	16,514	29–42–11	69	Recap

Legend: Win (2 points) Loss (0 points) Overtime/shootout loss (1 point)

== Player statistics ==
Final stats

=== Skaters ===
Regular season
Player	GP	G	A	Pts	+/−	PIM
Nazem Kadri	76	17	28	45	−15	73
P. A. Parenteau	77	20	21	41	0	68
Leo Komarov	67	19	17	36	−12	40
Morgan Rielly	82	9	27	36	−17	28
Tyler Bozak	57	12	23	35	−9	18
Jake Gardiner	79	7	24	31	−15	32
James van Riemsdyk	40	14	15	29	3	6
Peter Holland	65	9	18	27	−16	28
Brad Boyes	60	8	16	24	−6	12
Dion Phaneuf^{‡}	51	3	21	24	−4	67
Michael Grabner	80	9	9	18	−4	12
Shawn Matthias^{‡}	51	6	11	17	−10	12
Colin Greening^{†}	30	7	8	15	−2	13
Joffrey Lupul	46	11	3	14	−10	12
Daniel Winnik^{‡}	56	4	10	14	−3	16
William Nylander	22	6	7	13	1	4
Roman Polak^{‡}	55	1	12	13	8	56
Matt Hunwick	60	2	8	10	−17	32
Brooks Laich^{†}	21	1	6	7	−6	2
Martin Marincin	65	1	6	7	−3	34
Nick Spaling^{‡}	35	1	6	7	−7	18
Zach Hyman	16	4	2	6	0	18
Ben Smith^{†}	16	2	4	6	3	0
Connor Brown	7	1	5	6	−2	0
Milan Michalek^{†}	13	1	5	6	−1	6
Frank Corrado	39	1	5	6	−12	26
Josh Leivo	12	5	0	5	2	6
Nikita Soshnikov	11	2	3	5	−4	6
Byron Froese	56	2	3	5	−11	16
Mark Arcobello	20	3	1	4	0	0
Connor Carrick	16	2	2	4	−3	15
Richard Clune	19	0	4	4	1	22
Brendan Leipsic	6	1	2	3	−1	2
Viktor Loov	4	0	2	2	4	0
Tobias Lindberg	6	0	2	2	0	4
T. J. Brennan	7	1	0	1	−6	6
Andrew Campbell	6	0	1	1	0	2
Scott Harrington	15	0	1	1	0	4
Frederik Gauthier	7	0	1	1	−5	0
Sam Carrick	3	0	0	0	−2	4
Stuart Percy	3	0	0	0	−2	0
Rinat Valiev	10	0	0	0	0	0
Kasperi Kapanen	9	0	0	0	−3	2

=== Goaltenders ===
Regular season
Player	GP	GS	TOI	W	L	OT	GA	GAA	SA	SV%	SO	G	A	PIM
Jonathan Bernier	38	36	2146:46	12	21	3	103	2.88	1114	.907	3	0	0	2
James Reimer^{‡}	32	29	1809:01	11	12	7	75	2.49	845	.918	0	0	0	0
Garret Sparks	17	17	974:57	6	9	1	49	3.02	456	.892	1	0	0	0

^{†}Denotes player spent time with another team before joining the Maple Leafs. Stats reflect time with the Maple Leafs only.
^{‡}Denotes player was traded mid-season. Stats reflect time with the Maple Leafs only.
Bold/italics denotes franchise record.

== Player suspensions/fines ==
Player	Explanation	Length	Salary	Date issued
Nazem Kadri	Making a throat slashing gesture towards Calgary Flames defenseman Mark Giordano during NHL Game No. 805 in Calgary on Tuesday, February 9, 2016.	–	$5,000	February 11, 2016
Leo Komarov	Elbowing New York Rangers defenceman Ryan McDonagh during NHL game No. 860 in Toronto on Thursday, February 18, 2016, at 18:58 of the first period.	3 games	$47,580.64	February 19, 2016
Nazem Kadri	For three diving/embellishment incidents between February 4 and March 21, 2016.	–	$5,000	April 1, 2016
Nazem Kadri	Cross-checking Detroit Red Wings forward Luke Glendening during NHL Game No. 1170 in Toronto on Saturday, April 2, at 7:23 of the second period.	4 games	$200,000	April 4, 2016

== Awards and honours ==
=== Awards ===
Regular season
Player	Award	Awarded
James Reimer	NHL Third Star of the Week	November 16, 2015
Tyler Bozak	NHL Third Star of the Week	December 28, 2015
Leo Komarov	NHL All-Star game selection	January 6, 2016

=== Milestones ===
A variety of milestones were set by players during the season. In terms of debuts, twelve players appeared in this first NHL game this season. They include Byron Froese, Garret Sparks, Brendan Leipsic, Viktor Loov, Zach Hyman, Kasperi Kapanen, William Nylander, Nikita Soshnikov, Rinat Valiev, Connor Brown, Frederik Gauthier and Tobias Lindberg.

Regular season
Player	Milestone	Reached
Byron Froese	1st Career NHL Game	October 24, 2015
Scott Harrington	1st Career NHL Assist; 1st Career NHL Point	October 24, 2015
Jonathan Bernier	10,000 Career NHL Minutes	October 30, 2015
Byron Froese	1st Career NHL Assist; 1st Career NHL Point	November 2, 2015
James Reimer	10,000 Career NHL Minutes	November 12, 2015
Joffrey Lupul	200th Career NHL Goal	November 14, 2015
Garret Sparks	1st Career NHL Game; 1st Career NHL Win; 1st Career NHL Shutout	November 30, 2015
Martin Marincin	100th Career NHL Game	December 2, 2015
Tyler Bozak	400th Career NHL Game	December 3, 2015
Nick Spaling	400th Career NHL Game	December 5, 2015
Tyler Bozak	100th Career NHL Goal	December 15, 2015
Frank Corrado	1st Career NHL Assist	December 17, 2015
Byron Froese	1st Career NHL Goal	December 19, 2015
Jonathan Bernier	10th Career NHL Shutout	December 19, 2015
Tyler Bozak	2nd Career NHL Hat-Trick	December 21, 2015
Daniel Winnik	600th Career NHL Game	December 27, 2015
Jake Gardiner	100th Career NHL Point	December 27, 2015
Michael Grabner	100th Career NHL Goal	December 27, 2015
Nazem Kadri	100th Career NHL Assist	December 29, 2015
Leo Komarov	Career High for Points in a Season	January 2, 2016
Leo Komarov	1st NHL All-Star Appearance	January 6, 2015
Mike Babcock	1000th Career NHL Game Coached	January 4, 2016
Dion Phaneuf	300th Career NHL Assist	January 16, 2016
James Reimer	200th Career NHL Game	February 2, 2016
Roman Polak	100th Career NHL Point	February 2, 2016
Josh Leivo	Career High for Goals in a Season	February 11, 2016
Brendan Leipsic	1st Career NHL Game; 1st Career NHL Goal; 1st Career NHL Point	February 13, 2016
Viktor Loov	1st Career NHL Game; 1st Career NHL Assist; 1st Career NHL Point	February 18, 2016
Jonathan Bernier	200th Career NHL Game	February 18, 2016
Brad Boyes	500th Career NHL Point	February 20, 2016
Zach Hyman	1st Career NHL Game	February 29, 2016
Kasperi Kapanen	1st Career NHL Game	February 29, 2016
William Nylander	1st Career NHL Game	February 29, 2016
Nikita Soshnikov	1st Career NHL Game	February 29, 2016
Nikita Soshnikov	1st Career NHL Goal; 1st Career NHL Point	March 2, 2016
William Nylander	1st Career NHL Goal; 1st Career NHL Point	March 5, 2016
Nikita Soshnikov	1st Career NHL Assist	March 7, 2016
Zach Hyman	1st Career NHL Goal; 1st Career NHL Point	March 7, 2016
Rinat Valiev	1st Career NHL Game	March 12, 2016
Connor Brown	1st Career NHL Game	March 17, 2016
Frederik Gauthier	1st Career NHL Game	March 19, 2016
Connor Brown	1st Career NHL Assist; 1st Career NHL Point	March 21, 2016
Connor Brown	1st Career NHL Goal	March 24, 2016
P. A. Parenteau	100th Career NHL Goal	March 29, 2016
Nazem Kadri	3rd Career NHL Hat-Trick	March 29, 2016
Tobias Lindberg	1st Career NHL Game; 1st Career NHL Assist; 1st Career NHL Point	March 31, 2016

== Transactions ==
The Maple Leafs have been involved in the following transactions during the 2015–16 season.

=== Trades ===
Date	Details		Ref
June 26, 2015	To Philadelphia Flyers NSH's 1st-round pick in 2015	To Toronto Maple Leafs TBL's 1st-round pick in 2015; CHI's 2nd-round pick in 2015
June 26, 2015	To Columbus Blue Jackets TBL's 1st-round pick in 2015	To Toronto Maple Leafs 2nd-round pick in 2015; PHI's 3rd-round pick in 2015
June 27, 2015	To Edmonton Oilers Brad Ross; PIT's 4th-round pick in 2015	To Toronto Maple Leafs Martin Marincin
July 1, 2015	To Pittsburgh Penguins Phil Kessel*; Tim Erixon; Tyler Biggs conditional PIT's 2nd-round pick in 2016 or 2nd-round pick in 2017	To Toronto Maple Leafs Nick Spaling; Kasperi Kapanen; Scott Harrington conditional 1st-round pick in 2016 or 1st-round pick in 2017 or 2nd-round pick in 2017; 3rd-round pick in 2016
July 12, 2015	To Nashville Predators Jamie Devane	To Toronto Maple Leafs Taylor Beck
September 16, 2015	To New York Islanders Taylor Beck; Carter Verhaeghe; Matt Finn; Tom Nilsson; Christopher Gibson	To Toronto Maple Leafs Michael Grabner
January 3, 2016	To Chicago Blackhawks Richard Panik	To Toronto Maple Leafs Jeremy Morin
February 9, 2016	To Ottawa Senators Dion Phaneuf; Matt Frattin; Casey Bailey; Ryan Rupert; Cody Donaghey	To Toronto Maple Leafs Jared Cowen; Milan Michalek; Colin Greening; Tobias Lindberg; 2nd-round pick in 2017
February 21, 2016	To Colorado Avalanche Shawn Matthias	To Toronto Maple Leafs Colin Smith; 4th-round pick in 2016
February 22, 2016	To San Jose Sharks Roman Polak; Nick Spaling	To Toronto Maple Leafs Raffi Torres; 2nd-round pick in 2017; 2nd-round pick in 2018
February 27, 2016	To San Jose Sharks James Reimer; Jeremy Morin	To Toronto Maple Leafs Alex Stalock; Ben Smith conditional 4th-round pick in 2018
February 28, 2016	To Washington Capitals Daniel Winnik; 5th-round pick in 2016	To Toronto Maple Leafs Brooks Laich; Connor Carrick; 2nd-round pick in 2016
June 20, 2016	To Anaheim Ducks PIT's 1st-round pick in 2016; 2nd-round pick in 2017	To Toronto Maple Leafs Frederik Andersen

=== Free agents acquired ===
Players signed to professional try out contracts are not included in this table. Please see off-season for try outs.

Date	Player	Former team	Contract terms (in U.S. dollars)	Ref
July 1, 2015	Matt Hunwick	New York Rangers	2 years, $2.4 million	
July 1, 2015	P. A. Parenteau	Montreal Canadiens	1 year, $1.5 million	
July 1, 2015	Mark Arcobello	Arizona Coyotes	1 year, $1.1 million	
July 1, 2015	Daniel Winnik	Pittsburgh Penguins	2 years, $4.5 million	
July 3, 2015	Byron Froese	Toronto Marlies (AHL)	2 years, entry-level contract	
July 6, 2015	Shawn Matthias	Vancouver Canucks	1 year, $2.3 million	
September 27, 2015	Brad Boyes	Florida Panthers	1 year, $700,000	
September 29, 2015	Andrew Campbell	Arizona Coyotes	2 years, $1.15 million	
October 29, 2015	Richard Clune	Toronto Marlies (AHL)	1 year, $575,000	
March 28, 2016	Kasimir Kaskisuo	University of Minnesota-Duluth (NCAA)	2 years, entry-level contract	
May 2, 2016	Nikita Zaitsev	CSKA Moscow (KHL)	1 year, entry-level contract	

=== Free agents lost ===
Date	Player	New team	Contract terms (in U.S. dollars)	Ref
July 2, 2015	Trevor Smith	SC Bern (NLA)	2 years, value unknown	
July 3, 2015	Andrew MacWilliam	Winnipeg Jets	1 year, $600,000	
July 15, 2015	Zach Sill	Washington Capitals	1 year, $575,000	
August 24, 2015	Frazer McLaren	San Jose Sharks	1 year, $600,000	

=== Claimed via waivers ===
Player	Previous team	Date	Ref
Frank Corrado	Vancouver Canucks	October 6, 2015	

=== Lost via waivers ===
Player	New team	Date claimed off waivers	Ref
Petter Granberg	Nashville Predators	November 22, 2015	

=== Lost via retirement ===
Player	Ref
Troy Bodie	

=== Player signings ===
Date	Player	Contract terms (in U.S. dollars)	Ref
July 1, 2015	Richard Panik	1 year, $975,000	
July 5, 2015	Nazem Kadri	1 year, $4.1 million	
July 9, 2015	Martin Marincin	1 year, $700,000	
July 13, 2015	Taylor Beck	1 year, $875,000	
July 22, 2015	Travis Dermott	3 years, entry-level contract	
July 28, 2015	Mitch Marner	3 years, entry-level contract	
August 2, 2015	Jonathan Bernier	2 years, $8.3 million	
November 23, 2015	Andrew Nielsen	3 years, entry-level contract	
November 23, 2015	Dmytro Timashov	3 years, entry-level contract	
April 13, 2016	Morgan Rielly	6 years, $30 million contract extension	
April 13, 2016	Nazem Kadri	6 years, $27 million contract extension	
June 20, 2016	Frederik Andersen	5 years, $25 million	

== Draft picks ==
Below are the Toronto Maple Leafs' selections at the 2015 NHL entry draft, held on June 26–27, 2015 at the BB&T Center in Sunrise, Florida.

Round	#	Player	Pos	Nationality	College/Junior/Club team (League)
1	4	Mitch Marner	Center/Right Wing	Canada	London Knights (OHL)
2	34	Travis Dermott ^{1}	Defence	Canada	Erie Otters (OHL)
2	61	Jeremy Bracco ^{2}	Right wing	United States	U.S. NTDP (USHL)
3	65	Andrew Nielsen	Defence	Canada	Lethbridge Hurricanes (WHL)
3	68	Martins Dzierkals ^{3}	Left wing	Latvia	HK Rīga (MHL)
4	95	Jesper Lindgren	Defence	Sweden	Modo Hockey (SHL)
5	125	Dmytro Timashov	Left wing	Sweden	Quebec Remparts (QMJHL)
6	155	Stephen Desrocher	Defence	Canada	Oshawa Generals (OHL)
7	185	Nikita Korostelev	Right wing	Russia	Sarnia Sting (OHL)

=== Pick notes ===
1. The Toronto Maple Leafs' second-round pick was re-acquired as the result of a trade on June 26, 2015, that sent Tampa Bay's first-round pick in 2015 (29th overall) to Columbus in exchange for Philadelphia's third-round pick in 2015 (68th overall) and this pick.
  Columbus previously acquired this pick as the result of a trade on March 5, 2014, that sent Marian Gaborik to Los Angeles in exchange for Matt Frattin, a conditional third-round pick in 2014 and this pick.
  Los Angeles previously acquired this pick as the result of a trade on June 23, 2013, that sent Jonathan Bernier to Toronto in exchange for Ben Scrivens, Matt Frattin and this pick (being conditional at the time of the trade). The condition – Los Angeles will receive a second-round pick in 2014 or 2015 at Toronto's choice – was converted on January 18, 2014, when Toronto's second-round pick in 2014 was traded to the Anaheim Ducks.
2. The Chicago Blackhawks' second-round pick went to the Toronto Maple Leafs as the result of a trade on June 26, 2015, that Nashville's first-round pick in 2015 (24th overall) to Philadelphia in exchange for Tampa Bay's first-round pick in 2015 (29th overall) and this pick.
  Philadelphia previously acquired this pick as the result of a trade on February 27, 2015, that sent Kimmo Timonen to Chicago in exchange for a conditional fourth-round pick in 2016 and this pick.
3. The Philadelphia Flyers' third-round pick went the Toronto Maple Leafs as the result of a trade on June 26, 2015, that sent Tampa Bay's first-round pick in 2015 (29th overall) to Columbus in exchange for Toronto's second-round pick in 2015 (34th overall) and this pick.
  Columbus previously acquired this pick as the result of a trade on April 3, 2013, that sent Steve Mason to Philadelphia in exchange for Michael Leighton and this pick.
