= 2015–16 San Jose Sharks season =

Season of play of professional ice hockey team

2015–16 San Jose Sharks
- Western Conference champions
- Division: 3rd Pacific
- Conference: 6th Western
- 2015–16 record: 46–30–6
- Home record: 18–20–3
- Road record: 28–10–3
- Goals for: 241
- Goals against: 210

Team information
- General manager: Doug Wilson
- Coach: Peter DeBoer
- Captain: Joe Pavelski
- Alternate captains: Logan Couture; Joe Thornton
- Arena: SAP Center
- Average attendance: 16,746

Team leaders
- Goals: Joe Pavelski (38)
- Assists: Joe Thornton (63)
- Points: Joe Thornton (82)
- Penalty minutes: Mike Brown; Tommy Wingels (63)
- Plus/minus: Joe Pavelski (+25); Joe Thornton (+25)
- Wins: Martin Jones (37)
- Goals against average: James Reimer (1.62)

The 2015–16 San Jose Sharks season was the 25th season for the National Hockey League (NHL) franchise that was established on May 9, 1990. The team began its regular season on October 7, 2015 against the Los Angeles Kings. The Sharks reached the Stanley Cup Finals for the first time in franchise history, ultimately losing to the Pittsburgh Penguins in six games.

== Standings ==
Pacific Division
Pos	Team	GP	W	L	OTL	ROW	GF	GA	GD	Pts
1	y – Anaheim Ducks	82	46	25	11	43	218	192	+26	103
2	x – Los Angeles Kings	82	48	28	6	46	225	195	+30	102
3	x – San Jose Sharks	82	46	30	6	42	241	210	+31	98
4	Arizona Coyotes	82	35	39	8	34	209	245	−36	78
5	Calgary Flames	82	35	40	7	33	231	260	−29	77
6	Vancouver Canucks	82	31	38	13	26	191	243	−52	75
7	Edmonton Oilers	82	31	43	8	27	203	245	−42	70

Source: National Hockey League
x – Clinched playoff spot; y – Clinched division

== Schedule and results ==
=== Pre-season ===
Preseason game log: 4–2–1 (Home: 2–1–0; Road: 2–1–1)
#	Date	Visitor	Score	Home	OT	Decision	Attendance	Record	Recap
1^{[a]}	September 21	San Jose	0–1	Vancouver	OT	Dell	2,800 (approx.)	0–0–1
2	September 22	San Jose	4–0	Vancouver		Jones	––	1–0–1
3	September 25	Arizona	1–4	San Jose		Stalock	14,048	2–0–1
4	September 26	Anaheim	2–1	San Jose		Jones	14,722	2–1–1
5	September 29	Vancouver	1–2	San Jose		Jones	14,165	3–1–1
6	October 2	San Jose	3–0	Arizona		Jones	9,530	4–1–1
7	October 3	San Jose	1–5	Anaheim		Stalock	17,174	4–2–1
Notes:^{a} Game was played at The Q Centre in Colwood, British Columbia (Kraft Hockeyville game).

=== Regular season ===
Game Log 46–30–6 (Home: 18–20–3; Road: 28–10–3)

October: 5–5–0 (Home: 2–2–0; Road: 3–3–0)
#	Date	Visitor	Score	Home	OT	Decision	Attendance	Record	Pts	Recap
1	October 7	San Jose	5–1	Los Angeles		Jones	18,230	1–0–0	2
2	October 10	Anaheim	0–2	San Jose		Jones	17,562	2–0–0	4
3	October 13	San Jose	5–0	Washington		Jones	18,506	3–0–0	6
4	October 16	San Jose	2–1	New Jersey	SO	Jones	12,464	4–0–0	8
5	October 17	San Jose	3–6	NY Islanders		Stalock	11,577	4–1–0	8
6	October 19	San Jose	0–4	NY Rangers		Jones	18,006	4–2–0	8
7	October 22	Los Angeles	4–1	San Jose		Jones	16,797	4–3–0	8
8	October 24	Carolina	2–5	San Jose		Jones	15,814	5–3–0	10
9	October 28	Nashville	2–1	San Jose		Jones	15,219	5–4–0	10
10	October 31	San Jose	3–5	Dallas		Stalock	18,178	5–5–0	10

November: 9–4–0 (Home: 2–4–0; Road: 7–0–0)
#	Date	Visitor	Score	Home	OT	Decision	Attendance	Record	Pts	Recap
11	November 1	San Jose	4–3	Colorado		Jones	17,128	6–5–0	12
12	November 3	Columbus	5–2	San Jose		Jones	15,491	6–6–0	12
13	November 5	Florida	2–5	San Jose		Stalock	15,525	7–6–0	14
14	November 7	Anaheim	1–0	San Jose		Jones	17,562	7–7–0	14
15	November 10	NY Islanders	4–2	San Jose		Stalock	16,558	7–8–0	14
16	November 13	San Jose	3–2	Detroit		Jones	20,027	8–8–0	16
17	November 14	San Jose	2–1	Buffalo	OT	Jones	18,611	9–8–0	18
18	November 17	San Jose	5–4	Boston		Jones	17,565	10–8–0	20
19	November 19	San Jose	1–0	Philadelphia	OT	Jones	18,229	11–8–0	22
20	November 21	San Jose	3–1	Pittsburgh		Jones	18,534	12–8–0	24
21	November 22	San Jose	5–3	Columbus		Stalock	13,397	13–8–0	26
22	November 25	Chicago	5–2	San Jose		Jones	17,562	13–9–0	26
23	November 28	Calgary	2–5	San Jose		Jones	17,283	14–9–0	28

December: 4–7–2 (Home: 1–4–0; Road: 3–3–2)
#	Date	Visitor	Score	Home	OT	Decision	Attendance	Record	Pts	Recap
24	December 1	Pittsburgh	5–1	San Jose		Jones	16,624	14–10–0	28
25	December 4	San Jose	0–1	Anaheim		Jones	15,701	14–11–0	28
26	December 5	Tampa Bay	4–3	San Jose		Stalock	16,089	14–12–0	28
27	December 8	San Jose	2–4	Calgary		Jones	19,289	14–13–0	28
28	December 9	San Jose	3–4	Edmonton	OT	Jones	16,839	14–13–1	29
29	December 12	Minnesota	2–0	San Jose		Jones	16,766	14–14–1	29
30	December 15	San Jose	3–1	Montreal		Jones	21,288	15–14–1	31
31	December 17	San Jose	5–4	Toronto	OT	Jones	18,966	16–14–1	33
32	December 18	San Jose	2–4	Ottawa		Stalock	17,990	16–15–1	33
33	December 20	San Jose	3–4	Chicago	OT	Jones	22,096	16–15–2	34
34	December 22	San Jose	5–3	Los Angeles		Jones	18,493	17–15–2	36
35	December 28	Colorado	6–3	San Jose		Jones	17,562	17–16–2	36
36	December 30	Philadelphia	2–4	San Jose		Jones	17,562	18–16–2	38

January: 8–2–2 (Home: 5–2–2; Road: 3–0–0)
#	Date	Visitor	Score	Home	OT	Decision	Attendance	Record	Pts	Recap
37	January 2	Winnipeg	4–1	San Jose		Jones	17,562	18–17–2	38
38	January 7	Detroit	2–1	San Jose		Jones	16,856	18–18–2	38
39	January 9	Toronto	0–7	San Jose		Jones	17,281	19–18–2	40
40	January 11	San Jose	5–4	Calgary		Jones	19,227	20–18–2	42
41	January 12	San Jose	4–1	Winnipeg		Stalock	15,294	21–18–2	44
42	January 14	Edmonton	1–2	San Jose	SO	Jones	15,379	22–18–2	46
43	January 16	Dallas	3–4	San Jose	OT	Jones	17,562	23–18–2	48
44	January 18	Ottawa	4–3	San Jose	SO	Stalock	16,619	23–18–3	49
45	January 21	San Jose	3–1	Arizona		Jones	12,251	24–18–3	51
46	January 23	Minnesota	3–4	San Jose		Jones	16,956	25–18–3	53
47	January 24	Los Angeles	3–2	San Jose	OT	Jones	17,562	25–18–4	54
48	January 26	Colorado	1–6	San Jose		Jones	17,424	26–18–4	56

February: 8–4–2 (Home: 2–1–1; Road: 6–3–1)
#	Date	Visitor	Score	Home	OT	Decision	Attendance	Record	Pts	Recap
49	February 2	San Jose	2–3	Anaheim		Jones	16,588	26–19–4	56
50	February 4	San Jose	3–1	St. Louis		Jones	18,803	27–19–4	58
51	February 6	San Jose	2–6	Nashville		Jones	17,192	27–20–4	58
52	February 9	San Jose	2–0	Chicago		Jones	21,753	28–20–4	60
53	February 11	Calgary	6–5	San Jose	SO	Stalock	16,584	28–20–5	61
54	February 13	Arizona	1–4	San Jose		Jones	17,562	29–20–5	63
55	February 16	San Jose	4–2	Tampa Bay		Jones	19,092	30–20–5	65
56	February 18	San Jose	2–1	Florida	SO	Jones	13,019	31–20–5	67
57	February 19	San Jose	2–5	Carolina		Jones	11,756	31–21–5	67
58	February 22	San Jose	6–3	St. Louis		Jones	19,371	32–21–5	69
59	February 24	San Jose	3–4	Colorado	SO	Jones	15,564	32–21–6	70
60	February 26	Buffalo	3–1	San Jose		Jones	17,562	32–22–6	70
61	February 28	San Jose	4–1	Vancouver		Jones	18,570	33–22–6	72
62	February 29	Montreal	2–6	San Jose		Jones	16,205	34–22–6	74

March: 9–7–0 (Home: 5–6–0; Road: 4–1–0)
#	Date	Visitor	Score	Home	OT	Decision	Attendance	Record	Pts	Recap
63	March 3	San Jose	3–2	Vancouver		Jones	18,422	35–22–6	76
64	March 5	Vancouver	4–2	San Jose		Reimer	17,562	35–23–6	76
65	March 7	San Jose	2–1	Calgary	OT	Jones	18,740	36–23–6	78
66	March 8	San Jose	3–0	Edmonton		Reimer	16,839	37–23–6	80
67	March 10	New Jersey	3–0	San Jose		Jones	16,234	37–24–6	80
68	March 12	Washington	2–5	San Jose		Jones	17,562	38–24–6	82
69	March 15	Boston	2–3	San Jose		Reimer	16,624	39–24–6	84
70	March 17	San Jose	1–3	Arizona		Jones	13,005	39–25–6	84
71	March 19	NY Rangers	1–4	San Jose		Jones	16,888	40–25–6	86
72	March 20	Arizona	0–3	San Jose		Reimer	15,756	41–25–6	88
73	March 22	St. Louis	1–0	San Jose		Jones	15,411	41–26–6	88
74	March 24	Edmonton	6–3	San Jose		Reimer	16,570	41–27–6	88
75	March 26	Dallas	4–2	San Jose		Jones	16,439	41–28–6	88
76	March 28	Los Angeles	2–5	San Jose		Jones	17,066	42–28–6	90
77	March 29	San Jose	4–1	Vancouver		Reimer	18,315	43–28–6	92
78	March 31	Vancouver	4–2	San Jose		Jones	15,689	43–29–6	92

April: 3–1–0 (Home: 1–1–0; Road: 2–0–0)
#	Date	Visitor	Score	Home	OT	Decision	Attendance	Record	Pts	Recap
79	April 2	San Jose	3–2	Nashville	SO	Reimer	17,113	44–29–6	94
80	April 5	San Jose	3–0	Minnesota		Reimer	19,061	45–29–6	96
81	April 7	Winnipeg	5–4	San Jose		Jones	15,900	45–30–6	96
82	April 9	Arizona	0–1	San Jose		Jones	17,562	46–30–6	98

Legend: Win (2 points) Loss (0 points) Overtime/shootout loss (1 point)

=== Playoffs ===
The Sharks entered the playoffs as the Pacific Division's third seed and faced the second seed of the same division, the Los Angeles Kings, winning 4–1. In the second round they faced the Nashville Predators and advanced in seven games. In the Conference Finals, the Sharks met the St. Louis Blues, winning the series 4–2 and advancing to their first Stanley Cup Finals in history, where they lost in six games against the Pittsburgh Penguins.

2016 Stanley Cup playoffs

Western Conference First Round vs. (P2) Los Angeles Kings: San Jose won 4–1
#	Date	Visitor	Score	Home	OT	Decision	Attendance	Series	Recap
1	April 14	San Jose	4–3	Los Angeles		Jones	18,230	1–0
2	April 16	San Jose	2–1	Los Angeles		Jones	18,230	2–0
3	April 18	Los Angeles	2–1	San Jose	OT	Jones	17,562	2–1
4	April 20	Los Angeles	2–3	San Jose		Jones	17,562	3–1
5	April 22	San Jose	6–3	Los Angeles		Jones	18,543	4–1

Western Conference Second Round vs. (WC) Nashville Predators: San Jose won 4–3
#	Date	Visitor	Score	Home	OT	Decision	Attendance	Series	Recap
1	April 29	Nashville	2–5	San Jose		Jones	17,026	1–0
2	May 1	Nashville	2–3	San Jose		Jones	17,562	2–0
3	May 3	San Jose	1–4	Nashville		Jones	17,163	2–1
4	May 5	San Jose	3–4	Nashville	3OT	Jones	17,188	2–2
5	May 7	Nashville	1–5	San Jose		Jones	17,562	3–2
6	May 9	San Jose	3–4	Nashville	OT	Jones	17,292	3–3
7	May 12	Nashville	0–5	San Jose		Jones	17,562	4–3

Western Conference Finals vs. (C2) St. Louis Blues: San Jose won 4–2
#	Date	Visitor	Score	Home	OT	Decision	Attendance	Series	Recap
1	May 15	San Jose	1–2	St. Louis		Jones	19,483	0–1
2	May 17	San Jose	4–0	St. Louis		Jones	19,596	1–1
3	May 19	St. Louis	0–3	San Jose		Jones	17,562	2–1
4	May 21	St. Louis	6–3	San Jose		Jones	17,562	2–2
5	May 23	San Jose	6–3	St. Louis		Jones	19,372	3–2
6	May 25	St. Louis	2–5	San Jose		Jones	17,562	4–2

Stanley Cup Finals vs. (M2) Pittsburgh Penguins: Pittsburgh won 4–2
#	Date	Visitor	Score	Home	OT	Decision	Attendance	Series	Recap
1	May 30	San Jose	2–3	Pittsburgh		Jones	18,596	0–1
2	June 1	San Jose	1–2	Pittsburgh	OT	Jones	18,655	0–2
3	June 4	Pittsburgh	2–3	San Jose	OT	Jones	17,562	1–2
4	June 6	Pittsburgh	3–1	San Jose		Jones	17,562	1–3
5	June 9	San Jose	4–2	Pittsburgh		Jones	18,680	2–3
6	June 12	Pittsburgh	3–1	San Jose		Jones	17,562	2–4

Legend Win Loss

== Player statistics ==
Skaters

Regular season
Player	GP	G	A	Pts	+/−	PIM
Joe Thornton	82	19	63	82	+25	54
Joe Pavelski	82	38	40	78	+25	30
Brent Burns	82	27	48	75	−5	53
Patrick Marleau	82	25	23	48	−22	10
Tomas Hertl	81	21	25	46	+16	26
Joel Ward	79	21	22	43	−15	28
Marc-Edouard Vlasic	67	8	31	39	+15	48
Logan Couture	52	15	21	36	+2	20
Joonas Donskoi	76	11	25	36	+4	20
Justin Braun	80	4	19	23	+11	36
Chris Tierney	79	7	13	20	−16	20
Paul Martin	78	3	17	20	+13	22
Melker Karlsson	65	10	9	19	+5	16
Tommy Wingels	68	7	11	18	−10	63
Matt Nieto	67	8	9	17	−8	10
Brenden Dillon	76	2	9	11	+8	61
Dainius Zubrus	50	3	4	7	+4	20
Nick Spaling^{†}	23	2	4	6	+5	6
Dylan DeMelo	45	2	2	4	0	14
Matt Tennyson	29	1	3	4	+1	0
Mike Brown^{‡}	44	1	2	3	−3	63
Barclay Goodrow	14	0	3	3	+1	16
Roman Polak^{†}	24	0	3	3	−2	16
Nikolay Goldobin	9	1	1	2	+1	0
Micheal Haley	16	1	0	1	−2	48
Bryan Lerg	6	0	0	0	+1	0
Ryan Carpenter	1	0	0	0	0	0
John McCarthy	1	0	0	0	0	0
Mirco Mueller	11	0	0	0	−4	7
Ben Smith^{‡}	6	0	0	0	−1	0

Playoffs
Player	GP	G	A	Pts	+/−	PIM
Logan Couture	24	10	20	30	+5	8
Brent Burns	24	7	17	24	+11	12
Joe Pavelski	24	14	9	23	+1	4
Joe Thornton	24	3	18	21	+2	10
Joel Ward	24	7	6	13	+2	16
Patrick Marleau	24	5	8	13	+4	8
Joonas Donskoi	24	6	6	12	0	4
Marc-Edouard Vlasic	24	1	11	12	+14	12
Tomas Hertl	20	6	5	11	+8	4
Chris Tierney	24	5	4	9	+8	6
Melker Karlsson	24	5	3	8	+3	10
Justin Braun	24	2	5	7	+7	6
Paul Martin	24	0	5	5	+8	6
Matt Nieto	16	1	2	3	+2	8
Tommy Wingels	22	2	0	2	+4	21
Dainius Zubrus	14	1	1	2	+1	6
Brenden Dillon	24	0	2	2	−5	11
Nick Spaling	24	0	1	1	+1	6
Roman Polak	24	0	0	0	−5	15

Goaltenders

Regular season
Player	GP	GS	TOI	W	L	OT	GA	GAA	SA	SV%	SO	G	A	PIM
Martin Jones	65	65	3785:52	37	23	4	143	2.27	1734	.918	6	0	0	0
James Reimer	8	8	481:26	6	2	0	13	1.62	208	.938	3	0	0	0
Alex Stalock^{‡}	13	9	674:08	3	5	2	33	2.94	285	.884	0	0	1	0

Playoffs
Player	GP	GS	TOI	W	L	GA	GAA	SA	SV%	SO	G	A	PIM
Martin Jones	24	24	1473:18	14	10	53	2.16	684	.923	3	0	0	0
James Reimer	1	0	29:05	0	0	1	2.06	7	.857	0	0	0	0

^{†}Denotes player spent time with another team before joining the Sharks. Stats reflect time with the Sharks only.
^{‡}Traded mid-season

== Awards and honours ==
=== Awards ===
Regular season
Player	Award	Awarded
M. Jones	NHL First Star of the Week	November 23, 2015
B. Burns	NHL All-Star game selection	January 6, 2016
J. Pavelski	NHL All-Star game selection	January 6, 2016

=== Milestones ===
Regular season
Player	Milestone	Reached
J. Donskoi	1st career NHL game 1st career NHL goal 1st career NHL point	October 7, 2015
P. Martin	700th career NHL game	October 13, 2015
N. Goldobin	1st career NHL game	October 16, 2015
N. Goldobin	1st career NHL goal 1st Career NHL point	October 17, 2015
J. Ward	100th Career NHL goal	October 24, 2015
T. Wingels	100th Career NHL point	October 31, 2015
J. Braun	300th career NHL game	November 5, 2015
N. Goldobin	1st career NHL assist	November 5, 2015
J. Thornton	1,300th career NHL game	November 10, 2015
J. Pavelski	500th career NHL point	November 14, 2015
M. Jones	10th career NHL shutout	November 19, 2015
P. Marleau	1,000th career NHL point	November 21, 2015

=== Suspensions and fines ===
Player	Explanation	Length	Salary	Date issued
Raffi Torres	Illegal check to the head of Anaheim Ducks forward Jakob Silfverberg	41 games	$440,860.29	October 5, 2015

== Transactions ==
The Sharks have been involved in the following transactions during the 2015–16 season:

=== Trades ===
Date	Details		Ref
June 27, 2015	To Dallas Stars Antti Niemi (rights)	To San Jose Sharks 7th-round pick in 2015
June 27, 2015	To Vancouver Canucks TBL's 7th-round pick in 2015	To San Jose Sharks Patrick McNally
June 27, 2015	To Colorado Avalanche 2nd-round pick in 2015; COL's 2nd-round pick in 2016; 6th-round pick in 2017	To San Jose Sharks BUF's 2nd-round pick in 2015
June 29, 2015	To St. Louis Blues Konrad Abeltshauser	To San Jose Sharks Conditional 7th-round pick in 2016
June 29, 2015	To Boston Bruins Sean Kuraly; 1st-round pick in 2016	To San Jose Sharks Martin Jones
February 22, 2016	To Toronto Maple Leafs Raffi Torres; 2nd-round pick in 2017; 2nd-round pick in 2018	To San Jose Sharks Roman Polak; Nick Spaling
February 27, 2016	To Toronto Maple Leafs Alex Stalock; Ben Smith conditional 4th-round pick in 2018	To San Jose Sharks James Reimer; Jeremy Morin
May 26, 2016	To Detroit Red Wings Dylan Sadowy	To San Jose Sharks 3rd-round pick in 2017
June 20, 2016	To Arizona Coyotes 4th-round pick in 2016; DET's 3rd-round pick in 2017	To San Jose Sharks Maxim Letunov; 6th-round pick in 2017

=== Free agents acquired ===
Date	Player	Former team	Contract terms (in U.S. dollars)	Ref
July 1, 2015	Paul Martin	Pittsburgh Penguins	4 years, $19.4 million	
July 2, 2015	Mark Cundari	Adirondack Flames	1 year, $600,000	
July 3, 2015	Joel Ward	Washington Capitals	3 years, $9.825 million	
August 24, 2015	Frazer McLaren	Toronto Maple Leafs	1 year, $600,000	
November 24, 2015	Dainius Zubrus	New Jersey Devils	1 year, $600,000	
March 2, 2016	Jon Martin	Swift Current Broncos	entry-level contract	
April 11, 2016	Mantas Armalis	Djurgarden	entry-level contract	

=== Free agents lost ===
Date	Player	New team	Contract terms (in U.S. dollars)	Ref
July 1, 2015	Taylor Fedun	Vancouver Canucks	1 year, $600,000	
July 10, 2015	Matt Irwin	Boston Bruins	1 year, $800,000	
July 10, 2015	John Scott	Arizona Coyotes	1 year, $575,000	

=== Lost via waivers ===
Player	New team	Date claimed off waivers
Mike Brown	Montreal Canadiens	February 29, 2016

=== Player signings ===
Date	Player	Contract terms (in U.S. dollars)	Ref
June 27, 2015	Melker Karlsson	2 years, $3.25 million	
June 27, 2015	Jeremy Langlois	1 year, $610,000	
June 27, 2015	Petter Emanuelsson	1 year, $800,000	
June 27, 2015	Karl Stollery	1 year, $600,000	
June 27, 2015	Troy Grosenick	2 years, $1.2 million	
June 30, 2015	Brenden Dillon	5 years, $16.35 million	
July 2, 2015	John McCarthy	1 year, $600,000	
July 2, 2015	Micheal Haley	1 year, $600,000	
July 2, 2015	Bryan Lerg	1 year, $600,000	
July 2, 2015	Patrick McNally	2 years, entry-level contract	
July 8, 2015	Timo Meier	3 years, entry-level contract	
September 13, 2015	Jeremy Roy	3 years, entry-level contract	
March 4, 2016	Adam Helewka	entry-level contract	
March 9, 2016	Kevin Labanc	entry-level contract	
March 11, 2016	Alex Schoenborn	entry-level contract	
April 9, 2016	Danny O'Regan	entry-level contract	
April 9, 2016	Michael Brodzinski	entry-level contract	

== Draft picks ==
Below are the San Jose Sharks' selections at the 2015 NHL entry draft, to be held on June 26–27, 2015 at the BB&T Center in Sunrise, Florida.

Round	#	Player	Pos	Nationality	College/Junior/Club team (League)
1	9	Timo Meier	RW	Switzerland	Halifax Mooseheads (QMJHL)
2	31^{[a]}	Jeremy Roy	D	Canada	Sherbrooke Phoenix (QMJHL)
3	86^{[b]}	Mike Robinson	G	United States	Lawrence Academy (USHS–MA)
4	106^{[c]}	Adam Helewka	LW	Canada	Spokane Chiefs (WHL)
5	130	Karlis Cukste	D	Latvia	HK Riga (MHL)
5	142^{[d]}	Rudolfs Balcers	LW	Latvia	Stavanger Oilers (GET-ligaen)
6	160	Adam Parsells	D	United States	Wausau West High School (USHS–WI)
7	190	Marcus Vela	C	Canada	Langley Rivermen (BCHL)
7	193^{[e]}	John Kupsky	G	United States	Lone Star Brahmas (NAHL)

Draft notes

- ^{a} The Buffalo Sabres' second-round pick (from Colorado) went to the San Jose Sharks as the result of a trade on June 27, 2015 that sent a second-round pick in 2015, a second-round pick in 2016 and a sixth-round pick in 2017 to Colorado in exchange for this pick.
- The San Jose Sharks' second-round pick went to the Colorado Avalanche as the result of a trade on June 27, 2015 that a second-round pick in 2015 to San Jose in exchange for a second-round pick in 2016, a sixth-round pick in 2017 and this pick.
- The San Jose Sharks' third-round pick went to the Philadelphia Flyers as the result of a trade on July 2, 2014 that sent Tye McGinn to San Jose in exchange for this pick.
- ^{b} The St. Louis Blues' third-round pick (from Edmonton) went to the San Jose Sharks as the result of compensation for Head Coach Todd McLellan.
- The San Jose Sharks' fourth-round pick went to the Nashville Predators as the result of a trade on June 28, 2014 that sent Detroit's second-round pick in 2014 to San Jose in exchange for a second-round pick in 2014 and this pick.
- ^{c} The Calgary Flames' fourth-round pick went to the San Jose Sharks as the result of a trade on July 2, 2013 that sent TJ Galiardi to Calgary in exchange for this pick.
- ^{d} The New York Islanders' fifth-round pick went to the San Jose Sharks as the result of a trade on June 5, 2014 that sent Dan Boyle to New York in exchange for this pick (being conditional at the time of the trade). The condition – San Jose will receive a fifth-round pick in 2015 if Boyle is not re-signed by the Islanders for the 2014–15 NHL season – was converted on July 1, 2014.
- ^{e} The Dallas Stars' seventh-round pick went to the San Jose Sharks as the result of a trade on June 27, 2015 that sent the rights to Antti Niemi to Dallas in exchange for this pick.
