= 2015–16 Boston Bruins season =

NHL team season

2015–16 Boston Bruins
- Division: 4th Atlantic
- Conference: 9th Eastern
- 2015–16 record: 42–31–9
- Home record: 17–18–6
- Road record: 25–13–3
- Goals for: 240
- Goals against: 230

Team information
- General manager: Don Sweeney
- Coach: Claude Julien
- Captain: Zdeno Chara
- Alternate captains: Patrice Bergeron; Chris Kelly; David Krejci
- Arena: TD Garden
- Average attendance: 17,565
- Minor league affiliate: Providence Bruins (AHL)

Team leaders
- Goals: Brad Marchand (37)
- Assists: David Krejci (46)
- Points: Patrice Bergeron (68)
- Penalty minutes: Brad Marchand (90)
- Plus/minus: Brad Marchand (+21)
- Wins: Tuukka Rask (31)
- Goals against average: Tuukka Rask (2.56)

The 2015–16 Boston Bruins season was the 92nd season for the National Hockey League (NHL) franchise that was established on November 1, 1924. The season began its regular games on October 8, 2015, against the Winnipeg Jets with a 6–2 loss. One all-time franchise achievement the Bruins attained this season is shared by only their greatest rival, the Canadiens - a total of 3,000 wins in the team's existence, achieved by the Bruins on January 8, 2016, in a 4–1 road victory against the New Jersey Devils. However, the Bruins missed the playoffs for the second straight season, and missed the playoffs in back-to-back years for the first time since the 2005–06 season and the 2006–07 season. This was the last time the Bruins failed to qualify for the Stanley Cup playoffs until the 2024–25 season.

== Standings ==
Atlantic Division
Pos	Team	GP	W	L	OTL	ROW	GF	GA	GD	Pts
1	y – Florida Panthers	82	47	26	9	40	239	203	+36	103
2	x – Tampa Bay Lightning	82	46	31	5	43	227	201	+26	97
3	x – Detroit Red Wings	82	41	30	11	39	211	224	−13	93
4	Boston Bruins	82	42	31	9	38	240	230	+10	93
5	Ottawa Senators	82	38	35	9	32	236	247	−11	85
6	Montreal Canadiens	82	38	38	6	33	221	236	−15	82
7	Buffalo Sabres	82	35	36	11	33	201	222	−21	81
8	Toronto Maple Leafs	82	29	42	11	23	198	246	−48	69

Source: National Hockey League
x – Clinched playoff spot; y – Clinched division

Eastern Conference Wild Card
Pos	Div	Team	GP	W	L	OTL	ROW	GF	GA	GD	Pts
1	ME	x – New York Islanders	82	45	27	10	40	232	216	+16	100
2	ME	x – Philadelphia Flyers	82	41	27	14	38	214	218	−4	96
3	AT	Boston Bruins	82	42	31	9	38	240	230	+10	93
4	ME	Carolina Hurricanes	82	35	31	16	33	198	226	−28	86
5	AT	Ottawa Senators	82	38	35	9	32	236	247	−11	85
6	ME	New Jersey Devils	82	38	36	8	36	184	208	−24	84
7	AT	Montreal Canadiens	82	38	38	6	33	221	236	−15	82
8	AT	Buffalo Sabres	82	35	36	11	33	201	222	−21	81
9	ME	Columbus Blue Jackets	82	34	40	8	28	219	252	−33	76
10	AT	Toronto Maple Leafs	82	29	42	11	23	198	246	−48	69

Source: National Hockey League
x – Clinched playoff spot

== Schedule and results ==
=== Pre-season ===
2015 preseason game log: 4–2–1 (Home: 3–1–0; Road: 1–1–1)
#	Date	Visitor	Score	Home	OT	Decision	Attendance	Record	Recap
1	September 20	New Jersey Devils	0–2	Boston Bruins		Gustavsson	––	1–0–0	Recap
2	September 22	Washington Capitals	1–2	Boston Bruins	OT	McIntyre	16,460	2–0–0	Recap
3	September 24	New York Rangers	3–4	Boston Bruins	SO	Smith	16,803	3–0–0	Recap
4	September 26	Boston Bruins	4–3	Detroit Red Wings	OT	Subban	––	4–0–0	Recap
5	September 28	Detroit Red Wings	3–1	Boston Bruins		Rask	16,681	4–1–0	Recap
6	September 30	Boston Bruins	2–3	New York Rangers		Gustavsson	18,006	4–2–0	Recap
7	October 2	Boston Bruins	1–2	Washington Capitals	SO	Smith	16,243	4–2–1	Recap

=== Regular season ===
2015–16 game log

October: 6–3–1 (Home: 1–3–1; Road: 5–0–0)
#	Date	Visitor	Score	Home	OT	Decision	Attendance	Record	Pts	Recap
1	October 8	Winnipeg Jets	6–2	Boston Bruins		Rask	17,565	0–1–0	0	Recap
2	October 10	Montreal Canadiens	4–2	Boston Bruins		Rask	17,565	0–2–0	0	Recap
3	October 12	Tampa Bay Lightning	6–3	Boston Bruins		Rask	17,565	0–3–0	0	Recap
4	October 14	Boston Bruins	6–2	Colorado Avalanche		Gustavsson	15,082	1–3–0	2	Recap
5	October 17	Boston Bruins	5–3	Arizona Coyotes		Rask	13,411	2–3–0	4	Recap
6	October 21	Philadelphia Flyers	5–4	Boston Bruins	OT	Rask	17,565	2–3–1	5	Recap
7	October 23	Boston Bruins	5–3	New York Islanders		Gustavsson	13,113	3–3–1	7	Recap
8	October 27	Arizona Coyotes	0–6	Boston Bruins		Rask	17,565	4–3–1	9	Recap
9	October 30	Boston Bruins	3–1	Florida Panthers		Rask	14,112	5–3–1	11	Recap
10	October 31	Boston Bruins	3–1	Tampa Bay Lightning		Gustavsson	19,092	6–3–1	13	Recap

November: 7–5–0 (Home: 4–3–0; Road: 3–2–0)
#	Date	Visitor	Score	Home	OT	Decision	Attendance	Record	Pts	Recap
11	November 3	Dallas Stars	5–3	Boston Bruins		Rask	17,565	6–4–1	13	Recap
12	November 5	Boston Bruins	1–4	Washington Capitals		Rask	18,506	6–5–1	13	Recap
13	November 7	Boston Bruins	2–4	Montreal Canadiens		Gustavsson	21,288	6–6–1	13	Recap
14	November 8	Boston Bruins	2–1	New York Islanders		Rask	13,197	7–6–1	15	Recap
15	November 12	Colorado Avalanche	3–2	Boston Bruins		Rask	17,565	7–7–1	15	Recap
16	November 14	Detroit Red Wings	1–3	Boston Bruins		Rask	17,565	8–7–1	17	Recap
17	November 17	San Jose Sharks	5–4	Boston Bruins		Rask	17,565	8–8–1	17	Recap
18	November 19	Minnesota Wild	2–4	Boston Bruins		Gustavsson	17,565	9–8–1	19	Recap
19	November 21	Toronto Maple Leafs	0–2	Boston Bruins		Rask	17,565	10–8–1	21	Recap
20	November 23	Boston Bruins	4–3	Toronto Maple Leafs	SO	Rask	19,609	11–8–1	23	Recap
21	November 25	Boston Bruins	3–2	Detroit Red Wings	OT	Gustavsson	20,027	12–8–1	25	Recap
22	November 27	New York Rangers	3–4	Boston Bruins		Rask	17,565	13–8–1	27	Recap

December: 7–4–3 (Home: 4–3–1; Road: 3–1–2)
#	Date	Visitor	Score	Home	OT	Decision	Attendance	Record	Pts	Recap
23	December 2	Boston Bruins	2–3	Edmonton Oilers	SO	Rask	16,839	13–8–2	28	Recap
24	December 4	Boston Bruins	4–5	Calgary Flames	OT	Rask	19,289	13–8–3	29	Recap
25	December 5	Boston Bruins	4–0	Vancouver Canucks		Rask	18,570	14–8–3	31	Recap
26	December 7	Nashville Predators	3–2	Boston Bruins		Gustavsson	17,565	14–9–3	31	Recap
27	December 9	Boston Bruins	3–1	Montreal Canadiens		Rask	21,288	15–9–3	33	Recap
28	December 12	Florida Panthers	1–3	Boston Bruins		Rask	17,565	16–9–3	35	Recap
29	December 14	Edmonton Oilers	3–2	Boston Bruins	OT	Gustavsson	17,565	16–9–4	36	Recap
30	December 16	Pittsburgh Penguins	0–3	Boston Bruins		Rask	17,565	17–9–4	38	Recap
31	December 18	Boston Bruins	6–2	Pittsburgh Penguins		Rask	18,585	18–9–4	40	Recap
32	December 20	New Jersey Devils	1–2	Boston Bruins	SO	Gustavsson	17,565	19–9–4	42	Recap
33	December 22	St. Louis Blues	2–0	Boston Bruins		Rask	17,565	19–10–4	42	Recap
34	December 26	Buffalo Sabres	6–3	Boston Bruins		Gustavsson	17,565	19–11–4	42	Recap
35	December 27	Boston Bruins	1–3	Ottawa Senators		Rask	20,061	19–12–4	42	Recap
36	December 29	Ottawa Senators	3–7	Boston Bruins		Rask	17,565	20–12–4	44	Recap

January: 6–6–1 (Home: 2–4–0; Road: 4–2–1)
#	Date	Visitor	Score	Home	OT	Decision	Attendance	Record	Pts	Recap
37	January 1	Montreal Canadiens	5–1	Boston Bruins		Rask	67,246	20–13–4	44	Recap
38	January 5	Washington Capitals	3–2	Boston Bruins		Rask	17,565	20–14–4	44	Recap
39	January 8	Boston Bruins	4–1	New Jersey Devils		Gustavsson	16,514	21–14–4	46	Recap
40	January 9	Boston Bruins	1–2	Ottawa Senators	OT	Rask	19,125	21–14–5	47	Recap
41	January 11	Boston Bruins	1–2	New York Rangers		Rask	18,006	21–15–5	47	Recap
42	January 13	Boston Bruins	2–3	Philadelphia Flyers		Rask	19,704	21–16–5	47	Recap
43	January 15	Boston Bruins	4–1	Buffalo Sabres		Gustavsson	18,704	22–16–5	49	Recap
44	January 16	Toronto Maple Leafs	2–3	Boston Bruins		Rask	17,565	23–16–5	51	Recap
45	January 19	Boston Bruins	4–1	Montreal Canadiens		Rask	21,288	24–16–5	53	Recap
46	January 21	Vancouver Canucks	4–2	Boston Bruins		Rask	17,565	24–17–5	53	Recap
47	January 23	Columbus Blue Jackets	2–3	Boston Bruins	SO	Gustavsson	17,565	25–17–5	55	Recap
48	January 25	Boston Bruins	3–2	Philadelphia Flyers		Rask	19,738	26–17–5	57	Recap
49	January 26	Anaheim Ducks	6–2	Boston Bruins		Gustavsson	17,565	26–18–5	57	Recap

February: 8–5–1 (Home: 2–3–1; Road: 6–2–0)
#	Date	Visitor	Score	Home	OT	Decision	Attendance	Record	Pts	Recap
50	February 2	Toronto Maple Leafs	4–3	Boston Bruins	OT	Rask	17,565	26–18–6	58	Recap
51	February 4	Boston Bruins	3–2	Buffalo Sabres	SO	Rask	18,845	27–18–6	60	Recap
52	February 6	Buffalo Sabres	1–2	Boston Bruins	OT	Rask	17,565	28–18–6	62	Recap
53	February 9	Los Angeles Kings	9–2	Boston Bruins		Rask	17,565	28–19–6	62	Recap
54	February 11	Boston Bruins	6–2	Winnipeg Jets		Rask	15,294	29–19–6	64	Recap
55	February 13	Boston Bruins	4–2	Minnesota Wild		Gustavsson	19,191	30–19–6	66	Recap
56	February 14	Boston Bruins	5–6	Detroit Red Wings		Gustavsson	20,027	30–20–6	66	Recap
57	February 16	Boston Bruins	2–1	Columbus Blue Jackets	OT	Rask	13,140	31–20–6	68	Recap
58	February 18	Boston Bruins	0–2	Nashville Predators		Rask	17,113	31–21–6	68	Recap
59	February 20	Boston Bruins	7–3	Dallas Stars		Rask	18,532	32–21–6	70	Recap
60	February 22	Columbus Blue Jackets	4–6	Boston Bruins		Gustavsson	17,565	32–22–6	70	Recap
61	February 24	Pittsburgh Penguins	1–5	Boston Bruins		Rask	17,565	33–22–6	72	Recap
62	February 26	Boston Bruins	4–1	Carolina Hurricanes		Rask	17,917	34–22–6	74	Recap
63	February 28	Tampa Bay Lightning	4–1	Boston Bruins		Rask	17,565	34–23–6	74	Recap

March: 6–6–2 (Home: 3–1–2; Road: 3–5–0)
#	Date	Visitor	Score	Home	OT	Decision	Attendance	Record	Pts	Recap
64	March 1	Calgary Flames	1–2	Boston Bruins		Rask	17,565	35–23–6	76	Recap
65	March 3	Chicago Blackhawks	2–4	Boston Bruins		Rask	17,565	36–23–6	78	Recap
66	March 5	Washington Capitals	2–1	Boston Bruins	OT	Rask	17,565	36–23–7	79	Recap
67	March 7	Boston Bruins	5–4	Florida Panthers	OT	Rask	19,194	37–23–7	81	Recap
68	March 8	Boston Bruins	1–0	Tampa Bay Lightning	OT	Gustavsson	19,092	38–23–7	83	Recap
69	March 10	Carolina Hurricanes	3–2	Boston Bruins	OT	Rask	17,565	38–23–8	84	Recap
70	March 12	New York Islanders	1–3	Boston Bruins		Rask	17,565	39–23–8	86	Recap
71	March 15	Boston Bruins	2–3	San Jose Sharks		Rask	16,624	39–24–8	86	Recap
72	March 18	Boston Bruins	0–4	Anaheim Ducks		Gustavsson	16,707	39–25–8	86	Recap
73	March 19	Boston Bruins	1–2	Los Angeles Kings		Rask	18,373	39–26–8	86	Recap
74	March 23	Boston Bruins	2–5	New York Rangers		Gustavsson	18,006	39–27–8	86	Recap
75	March 24	Florida Panthers	4–1	Boston Bruins		Rask	17,565	39–28–8	86	Recap
76	March 26	Boston Bruins	3–1	Toronto Maple Leafs		Rask	19,185	40–28–8	88	Recap
77	March 29	Boston Bruins	1–2	New Jersey Devils		Rask	15,486	40–29–8	88	Recap

April: 2–2–1 (Home: 1–1–1; Road: 1–1–0)
#	Date	Visitor	Score	Home	OT	Decision	Attendance	Record	Pts	Recap
78	April 1	Boston Bruins	6–5	St. Louis Blues		Rask	19,202	41–29–8	90	Recap
79	April 3	Boston Bruins	4–6	Chicago Blackhawks		Gustavsson	22,156	41–30–8	90	Recap
80	April 5	Carolina Hurricanes	2–1	Boston Bruins	SO	Rask	17,565	41–30–9	91	Recap
81	April 7	Detroit Red Wings	2–5	Boston Bruins		Rask	17,565	42–30–9	93	Recap
82	April 9	Ottawa Senators	6–1	Boston Bruins		Gustavsson	17,565	42–31–9	93	Recap

Legend: Win (2 points) Loss (0 points) Overtime/shootout loss (1 point)

== Player stats ==
Final stats

=== Skaters ===
Regular season
Player	GP	G	A	Pts	+/−	PIM
Patrice Bergeron	80	32	36	68	12	49
Loui Eriksson	82	30	33	63	13	12
David Krejci	72	17	46	63	4	32
Brad Marchand	77	37	24	61	21	90
Ryan Spooner	80	13	36	49	−9	35
Torey Krug	81	4	40	44	9	33
Matt Beleskey	80	15	22	37	6	65
Zdeno Chara	80	9	28	37	12	71
Jimmy Hayes	75	13	16	29	−12	60
David Pastrnak	51	15	11	26	3	20
Brett Connolly	71	9	16	25	−1	20
Kevan Miller	71	5	13	18	15	53
Colin Miller	42	3	13	16	0	39
Dennis Seidenberg	61	1	11	12	−1	24
Frank Vatrano	39	8	3	11	−3	14
Landon Ferraro^{†}	58	5	5	10	−8	20
Lee Stempniak^{†}	19	3	7	10	1	4
Adam McQuaid	64	1	8	9	6	89
Maxime Talbot	38	2	5	7	−11	15
Zach Trotman	38	2	5	7	3	22
Joe Morrow	33	1	6	7	−7	4
Tyler Randell	27	6	0	6	−2	47
John-Michael Liles^{†}	17	0	6	6	−7	2
Joonas Kemppainen	44	2	3	5	−6	4
Zac Rinaldo	52	1	2	3	−5	83
Chris Kelly	11	2	0	2	3	0
Tommy Cross	3	0	1	1	−1	0
Seth Griffith	4	0	1	1	−4	4
Noel Acciari	19	0	1	1	−4	8
Matt Irwin	2	0	0	0	−5	0
Alexander Khokhlachev	5	0	0	0	−2	0

=== Goaltenders ===
Regular season
Player	GP	GS	MIN	W	L	OT	GA	GAA	SA	SV%	SO	G	A	PIM
Tuukka Rask	64	62	3678	31	22	8	157	2.56	1854	.915	4	0	1	0
Jonas Gustavsson	24	20	1258	11	9	1	57	2.72	622	.908	1	0	0	0

- ^{†}Denotes player spent time with another team before joining Bruins. Stats reflect time with the Bruins only.
- ^{‡}Denotes player was traded mid-season. Stats reflect time with the Bruins only.

== Suspensions/fines ==
Player	Explanation	Length	Salary	Date issued
Brad Marchand	Roughing Colorado Avalanche forward Gabriel Landeskog during NHL Game No. 230 in Boston on Thursday, November 12, 2015, at 5:46 of the second period.	—	$5,000	November 13, 2015
Maxime Talbot	Interference against New Jersey Devils forward Jiri Tlusty during NHL Game No. 494 in Boston on Sunday, December 20, 2015, at 14:30 of the second period.	2 games	$19,354.84	December 21, 2015
Brad Marchand	Clipping Ottawa Senators defenseman Mark Borowiecki during NHL Game No. 541 in Boston on Tuesday, December 29, 2015, at 8:41 of the first period.	3 games	$164,634.15	December 30, 2015

== Awards and honours ==
=== Awards ===
Regular season
Player	Award	Awarded
B. Marchand	NHL First Star of the Week	November 2, 2015
D. Krejci	NHL Third Star of the Month	November 2, 2015
P. Bergeron	NHL All-Star game selection	January 6, 2016
B. Marchand	NHL Third Star of the Week	February 15, 2016

=== Milestones ===
Regular season
Player	Milestone	Reached
J. Kemppainen	1st Career NHL Game	October 8, 2015
C. Miller	1st Career NHL Game	October 10, 2015
T. Randell	1st Career NHL Game; 1st Career NHL Goal; 1st Career NHL Point	October 14, 2015
T. Cross	1st Career NHL Game	October 14, 2015
C. Miller	1st Career NHL Assist; 1st Career NHL Point	October 14, 2015
T. Cross	1st Career NHL Assist; 1st Career NHL Point	October 17, 2015
Z. Chara	1,200th Career NHL Game	October 23, 2015
J. Kemppainen	1st Career NHL Goal; 1st Career NHL Assist; 1st Career NHL Point	October 23, 2015
D. Krejci	300th Career NHL Assist	October 30, 2015
C. Miller	1st Career NHL Goal	November 3, 2015
K. Miller	100th Career NHL Game	November 5, 2015
F. Vatrano	1st Career NHL Game; 1st Career NHL Goal; 1st Career NHL Point	November 7, 2015
D. Seidenberg	700th Career NHL Game	November 16, 2015
A. McQuaid	300th Career NHL Game	November 16, 2015
B. Marchand	First-ever Bruins game-winning penalty shot in overtime	February 6, 2016
C. Julien	Total wins as Bruins coach reaches 387 games, matching Art Ross	March 3, 2016

== Transactions ==
The Bruins have been involved in the following transactions during the 2015–16 season:

=== Trades ===
Date	Details		Ref
June 26, 2015	To Calgary Flames Dougie Hamilton (rights)	To Boston Bruins 1st-round pick in 2015; Two 2nd-round picks in 2015
June 26, 2015	To Los Angeles Kings Milan Lucic	To Boston Bruins Martin Jones; Colin Miller; 1st-round pick in 2015
June 26, 2015	To Minnesota Wild 5th-round pick in 2015	To Boston Bruins 5th-round pick in 2016
June 29, 2015	To Philadelphia Flyers 3rd-round pick in 2017	To Boston Bruins Zac Rinaldo
June 30, 2015	To San Jose Sharks Martin Jones	To Boston Bruins Sean Kuraly; 1st-round pick in 2016
July 1, 2015	To Florida Panthers Reilly Smith; Marc Savard (rights)	To Boston Bruins Jimmy Hayes (rights)
February 29, 2016	To New Jersey Devils 4th-round pick in 2016; 2nd-round pick in 2017	To Boston Bruins Lee Stempniak
February 29, 2016	To Carolina Hurricanes Anthony Camara; 3rd-round pick in 2016; 5th-round pick in 2017	To Boston Bruins John-Michael Liles
March 4, 2016	To St. Louis Blues Zack Phillips	To Boston Bruins Future considerations

=== Free agents acquired ===
Date	Player	Former team	Contract terms (in U.S. dollars)	Ref
July 1, 2015	Matt Beleskey	Anaheim Ducks	5 years, $19 million	
July 6, 2015	Brandon DeFazio	Vancouver Canucks	1 year, $575,000	
July 10, 2015	Matt Irwin	San Jose Sharks	1 year, $800,000	
October 4, 2015	Jonas Gustavsson	Detroit Red Wings	1 year, $750,000	

=== Free agents lost ===
Date	Player	New team	Contract terms (in U.S. dollars)	Ref
July 1, 2015	Matt Bartkowski	Vancouver Canucks	1 year, $1.75 million	
July 1, 2015	David Warsofsky	Pittsburgh Penguins	1 year, $600,000	
July 1, 2015	Matt Lindblad	New York Rangers	1 year, $600,000	
July 1, 2015	Gregory Campbell	Columbus Blue Jackets	2 years, $3 million	
July 8, 2015	Paul Carey	Washington Capitals	1 year, $575,000	
January 21, 2016	Daniel Paille	New York Rangers	1 year, $575,000	

=== Claimed via waivers ===
Player	Previous team	Date
Landon Ferraro	Detroit Red Wings	November 22, 2015

=== Lost via waivers ===
Player	New team	Date

=== Player signings ===
Date	Player	Contract terms (in U.S. dollars)	Ref
June 30, 2015	Adam McQuaid	4 years, $11 million	
July 1, 2015	Ryan Spooner	2 years, $1.9 million	
July 1, 2015	Jeremy Smith	1 year, $600,000	
July 2, 2015	Chris Breen	1 year, $600,000	
July 6, 2015	Jimmy Hayes	3 years, $6.9 million	
July 6, 2015	Brett Connolly	1 year, $1.025 million	
July 15, 2015	Jakub Zboril	3 years, entry-level contract	
September 25, 2015	Brandon Carlo	3 years, entry-level contract	
November 12, 2015	Jake DeBrusk	entry-level contract	
November 12, 2015	Jeremy Lauzon	entry-level contract	
November 12, 2015	Zachary Senyshyn	entry-level contract	
March 29, 2016	Rob O'Gara	2 years, entry-level contract	
March 29, 2016	Sean Kuraly	entry-level contract	
April 1, 2016	Matt Grzelcyk	2 years, entry-level contract	
April 11, 2016	Danton Heinen	3 years, entry-level contract	
April 26, 2016	Dan Vladar	3 years, entry-level contract	
May 24, 2016	Kevan Miller	4 years, $10 million contract extension	
May 24, 2016	Seth Griffith	1 year, $625,000	
June 16, 2016	Peter Cehlarik	3 years, entry-level contract	

== Draft picks ==
Below are the Boston Bruins' selections at the 2015 NHL entry draft, to be held on June 26–27, 2015, at the BB&T Center in Sunrise, Florida.

Round	#	Player	Pos	Nationality	College/Junior/Club team (League)
1	13^{[a]}	Jakub Zboril	(D)	Czech Republic	Saint John Sea Dogs (QMJHL)
1	14	Jake DeBrusk	(LW)	Canada	Swift Current Broncos (WHL)
1	15^{[b]}	Zachary Senyshyn	(RW)	Canada	Sault Ste. Marie Greyhounds (OHL)
2	37^{[c]}	Brandon Carlo	(D)	United States	Tri-City Americans (WHL)
2	45 ^{[b]}	Jakob Forsbacka Karlsson	(C)	Sweden	Omaha Lancers (USHL)
2	52 ^{[d]}	Jeremy Lauzon	(D)	Canada	Rouyn-Noranda Huskies (QMJHL)
3	75	Dan Vladar	(G)	Czech Republic	HC Kladno (Czech 1. Liga)
4	105	Jesse Gabrielle	(LW)	Canada	Regina Pats (WHL)
6	165	Cameron Hughes	(C)	Canada	University of Wisconsin–Madison (B1G)
7	195	Jack Becker	(C)	United States	Mahtomedi Senior High School (High-MN)

Draft notes

- ^{a} The Los Angeles Kings' first round pick went to the Boston Bruins as the result of a trade on June 26, 2015, that sent Milan Lucic to Los Angeles in exchange for Martin Jones, Colin Miller and this pick.
- ^{b} The Calgary Flames' first and second-round picks went to the Boston Bruins as the result of a trade on June 26, 2015, that sent Dougie Hamilton to Calgary in exchange for Calgary and Washington's second-round picks in 2015 (45th and 52nd overall) and this pick.
- ^{c} The Philadelphia Flyers' second-round pick went to the Boston Bruins as the result of a trade on October 4, 2014, that sent Johnny Boychuk to New York in exchange for a second-round pick in 2016, a conditional third-round pick in 2015 and this pick.
- The Boston Bruins' second-round pick went to the Tampa Bay Lightning as the result of a trade on March 2, 2015, that sent Brett Connolly to Boston in exchange for a second-round pick in 2016 and this pick.
- ^{d} The Washington Capitals' second-round pick went to the Boston Bruins as the result of a trade on June 26, 2015 that sent Dougie Hamilton to Calgary in exchange for a first and second-round pick in 2015 (15th and 45th overall) and this pick.
  Calgary previously acquired this pick as the result of a trade on March 1, 2015 that sent Curtis Glencross to Washington in exchange for a third-round pick in 2015 and this pick.
- The Boston Bruins' fifth-round pick went to the Minnesota Wild as the result of a trade on June 26, 2015, that exchanged Minnesota's fifth-round pick in 2016 for this pick.
