= 2015–16 St. Louis Blues season =

National Hockey League team season

2015–16 St. Louis Blues
- Division: 2nd Central
- Conference: 2nd Western
- 2015–16 record: 49–24–9
- Home record: 24–13–4
- Road record: 25–11–5
- Goals for: 224
- Goals against: 201

Team information
- General manager: Doug Armstrong
- Coach: Ken Hitchcock
- Captain: David Backes
- Alternate captains: Alex Pietrangelo; Alexander Steen
- Arena: Scottrade Center
- Average attendance: 18,451 (96.3%)
- Minor league affiliate: Chicago Wolves (AHL)

Team leaders
- Goals: Vladimir Tarasenko (40)
- Assists: Paul Stastny (39)
- Points: Vladimir Tarasenko (74)
- Penalty minutes: David Backes (83)
- Plus/minus: Colton Parayko (+28)
- Wins: Jake Allen (26)
- Goals against average: Brian Elliott (2.07)

The 2015–16 St. Louis Blues season was the 49th season for the National Hockey League (NHL) franchise that was established on June 5, 1967.

== Regular season ==
=== March ===
On March 9, the NHL announced that the Winter Classic will be held in St. Louis, at Busch Stadium on January 2, 2017, against their inter-division rival Chicago Blackhawks. It will be the first time the Blues have hosted it, and the 23rd NHL team to play in an outdoor game. It will be the 9th NHL Winter Classic, with the game marking the 50th anniversary of the inaugural season of Blues hockey when it was admitted to the NHL in June 1967.

On March 25, the Blues clinched a playoff spot for the fifth consecutive season with a win over the Vancouver Canucks, 4–0, at home. Brian Elliott registered his third consecutive shutout (4th of the season, one fewer than Jake Allen) tying the franchise record with Greg Millen who did in from Dec. 1–6 in 1989, turning aside 15 shots, after missing 10 games with a lower-body injury. Elliott's previous three consecutive shutout streaks came from March 22–27 in 2012, and again from April 7–11, 2013. He shutout the Canucks earlier in the week on March 19, 3–0 at Vancouver, stopping 19 shots, and on March 22 against the San Jose Sharks, 1–0, stopping 37 shots, some on 5-3 and 6-3 penalty kills near the end of the game. Rookie defenseman Joel Edmundson ("Eddy"), scored his first NHL goal, while Kyle Brodziak got the Blues on the board first with his second short-handed goal of the season. Fellow rookie, center Robby Fabbri scored his 18th goal of the season, pushing the Blues to a 2–0 lead in the first period. Carl Gunnarsson made it 3–0 in the 2nd period before Edmundson finished off the scoring in the 3rd period.

On March 26, the Blues became only the 11th team in NHL history to post four consecutive shutouts (a new Blues' franchise record), after Jake Allen beat the league-leading Washington Capitals, 4–0, turning aside 32 shots at Washington for his sixth shutout of the season. It's the first time of a team winning with four consecutive shutouts since the Phoenix Coyotes had five December 31, 2003 – January 9, 2004, to set the modern record. The Blues have not allowed a goal in 240:18, for the longest streak in their history.

On March 29, Brian Elliott's shutout streak ended at 193:12 with a goal by Mikhail Grigorenko at 18:12 in the first period at home. The team's shutout streak ended at the same time at 258:29. Elliott is 10-0-1 in his last 12 starts, and leads the NHL with a 1.92 GAA and .935 SV%. The Blues again passed 100 points with a 46-22-9 record, and fighting for first place in the Central Division and Western Conference with the Dallas Stars after a 3–1 win over the Colorado Avalanche.

== Playoffs ==
=== April ===
The Blues vs. Chicago Game 5 on April 21, set a Fox Sports Midwest all-time ratings record. It was the most-watched Blues game on that regional sports network in the team's 20 seasons. The double overtime thriller, lost by the Blues 4–3, earned a 15.0 rating with 183,000 households watching in the St. Louis market, according to Nielsen Media Research. It was the most-watched program of the day in St. Louis, as were the previous four games of the series.

Robby Fabbri scored his first goal of the playoffs and added an assist giving him four points overall in the series (1g, 3a). The game marked the 11th all-time overtime playoff game between the Blues and Hawks. The Blues hold a 7–4 record in those games and a 3-1 mark in multiple overtime games. The Blues recorded 46 shots against goaltender Corey Crawford – the sixth highest total in a playoff game in club history. Alexander Steen led the team with six, which tied for his second-highest total in a postseason contest.

The Blues vs. Chicago in Game 7 on April 25, shattered all previous ratings records for Fox Sports Midwest. It was the most-watched telecast in the history of that network with a 19.6 rating in the St. Louis DMA, averaging 239,000 households, according to Nielsen Media Research. Viewing peaked at a 25.3 rating/308,000 households/39 share at the end of the game.

Before April 25, the highest-rated event on FOX Sports Midwest was the St. Louis Cardinals' victory at Houston Astros on Sept. 28, 2011 – the final day of the regular season, on which the Cardinals' win and subsequent Atlanta Braves loss put the Cardinals in the postseason. That Cardinals' game earned an 18.0.

Blues-Blackhawks was the No. 1 program of the day in St. Louis. During the game, from 7:30 to 10:30 p.m., it beat the combined rating of St. Louis' ABC, CBS, FOX and NBC affiliates (17.9). All seven games of the series were the No. 1 program of the day in St. Louis.

Game 7 was the most-watched program in St. Louis since the Super Bowl on Feb. 7.

The previous high for a Blues game came just last week – a 15.0 for Game 5 against Chicago. FOX Sports Midwest is in its 20th season as the home of the Blues and 23rd with the Cardinals.

=== May ===
After two thrilling 4-3 games playoff series wins against the Blackhawks and Stars, but then a six-game loss in the Western Conference Finals to the Sharks, coach Ken Hitchcock, 64, signed a one-year contract extension on May 31, in what he said would be his last season coaching. He guided the St. Louis Blues to their first Western Conference Final appearance since 2001. Hitchcock has accumulated a 224-103-36 (.667) record in 363 games behind the bench in St. Louis. His coaching career has spanned 19 NHL seasons, 1,404 games and 757 wins, which ranks fourth all-time in NHL history. He's led his teams to 13 appearances in the Stanley Cup Playoffs, winning one championship with the Dallas Stars in 1999. All of the assistant coaches have been offered similar one-year contract extensions. Blues associate coach Brad Shaw, who has been with the club since 2006, has decided not to return and will instead pursue other opportunities.

=== June ===
After associate coach Brad Shaw and assistant coach Kirk Muller decided to leave for other opportunities, Mike Yeo, 42 (b. July 31), was announced on June 13 to replace coach Ken Hitchcock after his last year (2016–17), starting in the 2017–18 season. Yeo joins the Blues as associate coach, while Rick Wilson will join the staff as an assistant coach. Ray Bennett (assistant coach), Jim Corsi (goalie coach) and Sean Ferrell (video coach) will also return. Yeo spent the majority of the last five seasons as the head coach of the Minnesota Wild, leading the club to a 173-132-44 record, including a 46-28-8 mark in 2014–15, which was the second-best mark in Wild history. Yeo also guided Minnesota to three post-season appearances, including back-to-back trips to the second round in 2014 and 2015.

== Standings ==
Central Division
Pos	Team	GP	W	L	OTL	ROW	GF	GA	GD	Pts
1	z – Dallas Stars	82	50	23	9	48	267	230	+37	109
2	x – St. Louis Blues	82	49	24	9	44	224	201	+23	107
3	x – Chicago Blackhawks	82	47	26	9	46	235	209	+26	103
4	x – Nashville Predators	82	41	27	14	37	228	215	+13	96
5	x – Minnesota Wild	82	38	33	11	35	216	206	+10	87
6	Colorado Avalanche	82	39	39	4	35	216	240	−24	82
7	Winnipeg Jets	82	35	39	8	32	215	239	−24	78

Source: National Hockey League
x – Clinched playoff spot; z – Clinched conference

== Schedule and results ==
=== Pre-season ===
2015 preseason game log: 4–2–0 (Home: 3–0–0; Road: 1–2–0)
#	Date	Visitor	Score	Home	OT	Decision	Attendance	Record	Recap
1^{[A]}	September 22	St. Louis	1–3	Columbus		Binnington	10,064	0–1–0	Recap
2^{[A]}	September 22	Columbus	2–5	St. Louis		Copley	10,388	1–1–0	Recap
3	September 24	Dallas	0–6	St. Louis		Elliott	11,876	2–1–0	Recap
4	September 26	St. Louis	1–3	Chicago		Allen	20,813	2–2–0	Recap
5	September 29	St. Louis	4–1	Dallas		Elliott	11,544	3–2–0	Recap
6	October 1	Chicago	2–5	St. Louis		Allen	14,303	4–2–0	Recap
^{A} – indicates split-squad game.

=== Regular season ===
2015–16 game log

October: 8–2–1 (Home: 4–0–1; Road: 4–2–0)
#	Date	Visitor	Score	Home	OT	Decision	Attendance	Record	Pts	Recap
1	October 8	Edmonton	1–3	St. Louis		Elliott	19,327	1–0–0	2	Recap
2	October 10	St. Louis	2–3	Minnesota		Allen	19,096	1–1–0	2	Recap
3	October 13	St. Louis	4–3	Calgary		Elliott	18,632	2–1–0	4	Recap
4	October 15	St. Louis	4–2	Edmonton		Elliott	16,839	3–1–0	6	Recap
5	October 16	St. Louis	4–3	Vancouver		Allen	18,362	4–1–0	8	Recap
6	October 18	St. Louis	4–2	Winnipeg		Elliott	15,294	5–1–0	10	Recap
7	October 20	St. Louis	0–3	Montreal		Allen	21,288	5–2–0	10	Recap
8	October 24	NY Islanders	3–2	St. Louis	OT	Elliott	19,186	5–2–1	11	Recap
9	October 27	Tampa Bay	0–2	St. Louis		Allen	19,184	6–2–1	13	Recap
10	October 29	Anaheim	1–2	St. Louis		Allen	16,904	7–2–1	15	Recap
11	October 31	Minnesota	2–3	St. Louis	OT	Allen	17,728	8–2–1	17	Recap

November: 7–4–2 (Home: 3–2–1; Road: 4–2–1)
#	Date	Visitor	Score	Home	OT	Decision	Attendance	Record	Pts	Recap
12	November 3	Los Angeles	3–0	St. Louis		Allen	17,529	8–3–1	17	Recap
13	November 4	St. Louis	6–5	Chicago	OT	Allen	21,676	9–3–1	19	Recap
14	November 7	St. Louis	4–0	Nashville		Allen	17,143	10–3–1	21	Recap
15	November 10	St. Louis	2–0	New Jersey		Allen	13,310	11–3–1	23	Recap
16	November 12	St. Louis	3–6	NY Rangers		Elliott	18,006	11–4–1	23	Recap
17	November 14	Chicago	4–2	St. Louis		Allen	19,808	11–5–1	23	Recap
18	November 16	Winnipeg	2–3	St. Louis		Allen	18,680	12–5–1	25	Recap
19	November 17	St. Louis	1–3	Columbus		Elliott	12,161	12–6–1	25	Recap
20	November 19	Buffalo	2–3	St. Louis	SO	Allen	17,359	13–6–1	27	Recap
21	November 21	Detroit	4–3	St. Louis	OT	Allen	18,098	13–6–2	28	Recap
22	November 23	St. Louis	2–1	Buffalo		Allen	17,563	14–6–2	30	Recap
23	November 25	St. Louis	3–4	Pittsburgh	OT	Allen	18,569	14–6–3	31	Recap
24	November 28	Columbus	1–3	St. Louis		Allen	19,227	15–6–3	33	Recap

December: 8–7–1 (Home: 6–5–0; Road: 2–2–1)
#	Date	Visitor	Score	Home	OT	Decision	Attendance	Record	Pts	Recap
25	December 1	Florida	3–1	St. Louis		Allen	15,395	15–7–3	33	Recap
26	December 4	St. Louis	1–2	NY Islanders	SO	Elliott	12,873	15–7–4	34	Recap
27	December 5	Toronto	4–1	St. Louis		Allen	18,698	15–8–4	34	Recap
28	December 8	Arizona	1–4	St. Louis		Allen	16,301	16–8–4	36	Recap
29	December 10	Philadelphia	4–2	St. Louis		Elliott	14,428	16–9–4	36	Recap
30	December 12	Dallas	0–3	St. Louis		Allen	15,023	17–9–4	38	Recap
31	December 13	Colorado	3–1	St. Louis		Allen	17,961	17–10–4	38	Recap
32	December 15	St. Louis	4–3	Winnipeg		Allen	15,294	18–10–4	40	Recap
33	December 17	Nashville	1–2	St. Louis		Allen	17,882	19–10–4	42	Recap
34	December 19	Calgary	2–3	St. Louis		Elliott	18,163	20–10–4	44	Recap
35	December 21	St. Louis	3–4	Philadelphia		Allen	19,676	20–11–4	44	Recap
36	December 22	St. Louis	2–0	Boston		Allen	17,565	21–11–4	46	Recap
37	December 26	Dallas	2–3	St. Louis	SO	Allen	19,185	22–11–4	48	Recap
38	December 27	St. Louis	0–3	Dallas		Elliott	18,532	22–12–4	48	Recap
39	December 29	Nashville	3–4	St. Louis	OT	Allen	19,319	23–12–4	50	Recap
40	December 31	Minnesota	3–1	St. Louis		Allen	19,194	23–13–4	50	Recap

January: 5–3–4 (Home: 3–1–1; Road: 2–2–3)
#	Date	Visitor	Score	Home	OT	Decision	Attendance	Record	Pts	Recap
41	January 2	St. Louis	1–4	Toronto		Allen	19,221	23–14–4	50	Recap
42	January 4	Ottawa	3–2	St. Louis	OT	Elliott	19,152	23–14–5	51	Recap
43	January 6	St. Louis	3–4	Colorado	OT	Allen	13,359	23–14–6	52	Recap
44	January 8	St. Louis	3–4	Anaheim	SO	Elliott	16,250	23–14–7	53	Recap
45	January 9	St. Louis	2–1	Los Angeles	SO	Elliott	18,413	24–14–7	55	Recap
46	January 12	New Jersey	2–5	St. Louis		Elliott	17,951	25–14–7	57	Recap
47	January 14	Carolina	4–1	St. Louis		Elliott	19,282	25–15–7	57	Recap
48	January 16	Montreal	3–4	St. Louis	OT	Elliott	19,501	26–15–7	59	Recap
49	January 18	Pittsburgh	2–5	St. Louis		Elliott	19,312	27–15–7	61	Recap
50	January 20	St. Louis	2–1	Detroit		Elliott	20,027	28–15–7	63	Recap
51	January 22	St. Louis	1–2	Colorado	SO	Elliott	16,366	28–15–8	64	Recap
52	January 24	St. Louis	0–2	Chicago		Elliott	22,138	28–16–8	64	Recap

February: 8–4–1 (Home: 3–3–1; Road: 5–1–0)
#	Date	Visitor	Score	Home	OT	Decision	Attendance	Record	Pts	Recap
53	February 2	St. Louis	1–0	Nashville		Elliott	16,045	29–16–8	66	Recap
54	February 4	San Jose	3–1	St. Louis		Elliott	18,803	29–17–8	66	Recap
55	February 6	Minnesota	1–4	St. Louis		Elliott	19,318	30–17–8	68	Recap
56	February 9	Winnipeg	2–1	St. Louis	SO	Elliott	18,323	30–17–9	69	Recap
57	February 12	St. Louis	5–3	Florida		Elliott	13,904	31–17–9	71	Recap
58	February 14	St. Louis	2–1	Tampa Bay		Elliott	19,092	32–17–9	73	Recap
59	February 16	Dallas	1–2	St. Louis	OT	Elliott	18,156	33–17–9	75	Recap
60	February 18	Los Angeles	1–2	St. Louis	OT	Elliott	18,923	34–17–9	77	Recap
61	February 20	St. Louis	6–4	Arizona		Elliott	15,839	35–17–9	79	Recap
62	February 22	San Jose	6–3	St. Louis		Allen	19,371	35–18–9	79	Recap
63	February 25	NY Rangers	2–1	St. Louis		Allen	17,524	35–19–9	79	Recap
64	February 27	St. Louis	0–5	Nashville		Allen	17,379	35–20–9	79	Recap
65	February 28	St. Louis	5–2	Carolina		Allen	15,128	36–20–9	81	Recap

March: 10–2–0 (Home: 4–0–0; Road: 6–2–0)
#	Date	Visitor	Score	Home	OT	Decision	Attendance	Record	Pts	Recap
66	March 1	St. Louis	4–3	Ottawa	SO	Allen	17,207	37–20–9	83	Recap
67	March 6	St. Louis	4–2	Minnesota		Allen	19,040	38–20–9	85	Recap
68	March 9	Chicago	2–3	St. Louis	SO	Allen	19,756	39–20–9	87	Recap
69	March 11	Anaheim	2–5	St. Louis		Allen	19,412	40–20–9	89	Recap
70	March 12	St. Louis	5–4	Dallas	OT	Allen	18,532	41–20–9	91	Recap
71	March 14	St. Louis	4–7	Calgary		Nilsson	19,107	41–21–9	91	Recap
72	March 16	St. Louis	4–6	Edmonton		Allen	16,839	41–22–9	91	Recap
73	March 19	St. Louis	3–0	Vancouver		Elliott	18,402	42–22–9	93	Recap
74	March 22	St. Louis	1–0	San Jose		Elliott	15,411	43–22–9	95	Recap
75	March 25	Vancouver	0–4	St. Louis		Elliott	19,580	44–22–9	97	Recap
76	March 26	St. Louis	4–0	Washington		Allen	18,506	45–22–9	99	Recap
77	March 29	Colorado	1–3	St. Louis		Elliott	19,263	46–22–9	101	Recap

April: 3–2–0 (Home: 1–2–0; Road: 2–0–0)
#	Date	Visitor	Score	Home	OT	Decision	Attendance	Record	Pts	Recap
78	April 1	Boston	6–5	St. Louis		Allen	19,202	46–23–9	101	Recap
79	April 3	St. Louis	5–1	Colorado		Allen	15,485	47–23–9	103	Recap
80	April 4	Arizona	2–5	St. Louis		Elliott	19,465	48–23–9	105	Recap
81	April 7	St. Louis	2–1	Chicago	OT	Elliott	22,075	49–23–9	107	Recap
82	April 9	Washington	5–1	St. Louis		Elliott	19,610	49–24–9	107	Recap

Legend: Win (2 points) Loss (0 points) Overtime/shootout loss (1 point)

=== Playoffs ===
2016 Stanley Cup playoffs

Western Conference First Round vs. (C3) Chicago Blackhawks: St. Louis won series 4–3
#	Date	Visitor	Score	Home	OT	Decision	Attendance	Series	Recap
1	April 13	Chicago	0–1	St. Louis	OT	Elliott	19,241	1–0	Recap
2	April 15	Chicago	3–2	St. Louis		Elliott	19,846	1–1	Recap
3	April 17	St. Louis	3–2	Chicago		Elliott	22,207	2–1	Recap
4	April 19	St. Louis	4–3	Chicago		Elliott	22,212	3–1	Recap
5	April 21	Chicago	4–3	St. Louis	2OT	Elliott	19,956	3–2	Recap
6	April 23	St. Louis	3–6	Chicago		Elliott	22,260	3–3	Recap
7	April 25	Chicago	2–3	St. Louis		Elliott	19,935	4–3	Recap

Western Conference Second Round vs. (C1) Dallas Stars: St. Louis won series 4–3
#	Date	Visitor	Score	Home	OT	Decision	Attendance	Series	Recap
1	April 29	St. Louis	1–2	Dallas		Elliott	18,532	0–1	Recap
2	May 1	St. Louis	4–3	Dallas	OT	Elliott	18,889	1–1	Recap
3	May 3	Dallas	1–6	St. Louis		Elliott	19,323	2–1	Recap
4	May 5	Dallas	3–2	St. Louis	OT	Elliott	19,770	2–2	Recap
5	May 7	St. Louis	4–1	Dallas		Elliott	18,754	3–2	Recap
6	May 9	Dallas	3–2	St. Louis		Elliott	19,808	3–3	Recap
7	May 11	St. Louis	6–1	Dallas		Elliott	18,754	4–3	Recap

Western Conference Final vs. (P3) San Jose Sharks: San Jose won series 4–2
#	Date	Visitor	Score	Home	OT	Decision	Attendance	Series	Recap
1	May 15	San Jose	1–2	St. Louis		Elliott	19,483	1–0	Recap
2	May 17	San Jose	4–0	St. Louis		Elliott	19,596	1–1	Recap
3	May 19	St. Louis	0–3	San Jose		Elliott	17,562	1–2	Recap
4	May 21	St. Louis	6–3	San Jose		Allen	17,562	2–2	Recap
5	May 23	San Jose	6–3	St. Louis		Allen	19,372	2–3	Recap
6	May 25	St. Louis	2–5	San Jose		Elliott	17,562	2–4	Recap

Legend: Win Loss

== Player statistics ==
=== Skaters ===
Final stats

Regular season
Player	GP	G	A	Pts	+/−	PIM
Vladimir Tarasenko	80	**40**	34	**74**	7	37
Alexander Steen ***	67	17	35	52	3	48
Paul Stastny	64	10	**39**	49	3	26
David Backes	79	21	24	45	4	**83**
Kevin Shattenkirk	72	14	30	44	−14	51
Troy Brouwer	**82**	18	21	39	2	62
Robby Fabbri	72	18	19	37	−2	25
Alex Pietrangelo **	73	7	30	37	10	20
Jori Lehtera	79	9	25	34	12	38
Colton Parayko	79	9	24	33	**28**	29
Jaden Schwartz *	33	8	14	22	8	8
Jay Bouwmeester	72	3	16	19	−4	18
Patrik Berglund	42	10	5	15	1	16
Scottie Upshall	70	6	8	14	5	44
Dmitrij Jaskin	65	4	9	13	3	26
Kyle Brodziak	76	7	4	11	−1	37
Carl Gunnarsson	72	3	6	9	7	31
Magnus Paajarvi	48	3	6	9	−9	8
Joel Edmundson	67	1	8	9	0	63
Scott Gomez^{‡}	21	1	7	8	−4	4
Ty Rattie	13	4	2	6	1	4
Ryan Reaves	64	3	1	4	−6	68
Robert Bortuzzo	40	2	1	3	2	52
Steve Ott ****	21	0	2	2	−3	34
Martin Havlat^{‡}	2	1	0	1	0	0
Andre Benoit	2	0	0	0	1	0
Chris Butler	5	0	0	0	−1	4
Jordan Caron	4	0	0	0	−3	0
Jeremy Welsh	2	0	0	0	0	2
Petteri Lindbohm	10	0	0	0	−4	7

Playoffs
Player	GP	G	A	Pts	+/−	PIM
Vladimir Tarasenko	20	**9**	6	**15**	−5	2
Robby Fabbri	20	4	**11**	**15**	1	6
David Backes	20	7	7	14	1	8
Jaden Schwartz	20	4	10	14	−5	6
Troy Brouwer	20	8	5	13	−1	26
Paul Stastny	20	3	10	13	−4	16
Kevin Shattenkirk	20	2	9	11	−8	19
Alexander Steen	20	4	6	10	−2	**30**
Alex Pietrangelo	20	2	8	10	3	16
Patrik Berglund	20	4	5	9	4	4
Jori Lehtera	20	3	6	9	0	10
Colton Parayko	20	2	5	7	1	4
Jay Bouwmeester	20	0	4	4	−1	24
Scottie Upshall	17	1	2	3	−1	10
Kyle Brodziak	20	2	0	2	−2	6
Dmitrij Jaskin	6	1	1	2	0	5
Carl Gunnarsson	19	0	2	2	**5**	7
Joel Edmundson	16	1	0	1	−4	8
Steve Ott	9	0	1	1	1	8
Robert Bortuzzo	5	0	1	1	1	2
Magnus Paajarvi	3	0	1	1	0	0
Ryan Reaves	5	0	0	0	0	7

Bold = led team

* Missed 49 games due to ankle fracture, Oct. 23-Feb. 10

** Missed 9 games due to right knee injury Feb. 6 (Feb. 8-Feb. 27)

*** Missed 15 games due to upper-body injury Feb. 20 (Feb. 21-Mar. 28)

**** Missed 54 final regular-season games, on IR due to right hamstring injury Dec. 5 (Dec. 6-Apr. 9). He was diagnosed with colitis on April 6, will be re-evaluated in 14 days. He returned to play in Game 3 of the StL-Chi playoffs, April 17.

=== Goaltenders ===
Final stats

Regular season
Player	GP	GS	TOI	W	L	OT	GA	GAA	SA	SV%	SO	G	A	PIM
Jake Allen *	47	44	2,583:22	26	15	3	101	2.35	1,260	.920	6	0	0	0
Brian Elliott **	42	38	2,263:00	23	8	6	78	2.07	1,113	**.930**	4	0	0	2
Anders Nilsson^{†}	3	0	87:18	0	1	0	4	2.76	44	.909	0	0	0	0
Pheonix Copley	1	0	24:26	0	0	0	1	2.50	6	.833	0	0	0	0
Jordan Binnington	1	0	12:47	0	0	0	1	4.62	4	.750	0	0	0	0

^{†}Denotes player spent time with another team before joining the Blues. Stats reflect time with the Blues only.
^{‡}Denotes player was traded mid-season. Stats reflect time with the Team only.

* Activated on Feb. 21, after missing 17 games (Jan. 9-Feb. 20)

** Activated on Mar. 18, after missing 10 games (Feb. 23-Mar. 18)

BOLD = led NHL

==== Playoffs ====
Final stats

Playoffs
Player	GP	GS	TOI	W	L	GA	GAA	SA	SV%	SO	G	A	PIM
Brian Elliott	18	18	1,057:40	9	9	43	2.44	546	.921	1	0	0	2
Jake Allen	5	2	169:06	1	1	7	2.49	68	.897	0	0	0	0

== Suspensions/fines ==
Player	Explanation	Length	Salary	Date issued
Ryan Reaves	Roughing Los Angeles Kings forward Anze Kopitar during NHL Game No. 177 in St. Louis on Tuesday, November 3, 2015, at 11:56 of the first period.	n/a	$3,024.19	November 4, 2015

== Awards and Milestones ==
=== Awards ===
Regular season
Player	Award	Awarded
V. Tarasenko	NHL Third Star of the Week	October 19, 2015
J. Allen	NHL Second Star of the Week	November 2, 2015
K. Shattenkirk	NHL Third Star of the Week	November 23, 2015
V. Tarasenko	NHL All-Star game selection	January 6, 2016
B. Elliott	NHL Third Star of the Week	January 25, 2016
V. Tarasenko	NHL First Star of the Week	March 14, 2016
B. Elliott	NHL Second Star of the Week	March 28, 2016
V. Tarasenko	Wins NHL 17 Cover Vote	June 22, 2016
C. Parayko	Named to NHL All-Rookie Team	June 22, 2016

=== Milestones ===
Regular season
Player	Milestone	Reached
R. Fabbri	1st Career NHL Game; 1st Career NHL Goal; 1st Career NHL Point	October 8, 2015
J. Edmundson	1st Career NHL Game	October 8, 2015
C. Parayko	1st Career NHL Game	October 8, 2015
C. Parayko	1st Career NHL Goal; 1st Career NHL Point	October 13, 2015
C. Gunnarsson	100th Career NHL Point	October 16, 2015
K. Shattenkirk	200th Career NHL Point	November 14, 2015
K. Brodziak	100th Career NHL Goal	November 21, 2015
B. Elliott	30th Career NHL Shutout	December 1, 2015
D. Backes	700th Game, StL Blues (5th highest)	January 24, 2016
D. Backes	204 Goals, StL Blues (6th highest)	March 16, 2016
V. Tarasenko	100th Career NHL Goal (28th Blues player)	March 19, 2016
B. Elliott	100th Win as StL Blue	March 22, 2016
J. Edmundson	1st NHL Goal	March 25, 2016
B. Elliott	3rd Consecutive Shutout (3rd time)	March 25, 2016

== Transactions ==
The Blues has been involved in the following transactions:

=== Trades ===
Date	Details		Ref
June 29, 2015	To San Jose Sharks Conditional 7th-round pick in 2016	To St. Louis Blues Konrad Abeltshauser
July 2, 2015	To Washington Capitals T.J. Oshie	To St. Louis Blues Troy Brouwer; Pheonix Copley; 3rd-round pick in 2016
January 15, 2016	To Detroit Red Wings Future considerations	To St. Louis Blues Richard Nedomlel
February 27, 2016	To Edmonton Oilers Niklas Lundstrom; 5th-round pick in 2016	To St. Louis Blues Anders Nilsson
March 4, 2016	To Boston Bruins Future considerations	To St. Louis Blues Zack Phillips
June 24, 2016	To Calgary Flames Brian Elliott	To St. Louis Blues 2nd-round pick in 2016; Conditional 3rd-round pick in 2018

=== Free agents acquired ===
Date	Player	Former team	Contract terms (in U.S. dollars)	Ref
July 2, 2015	Danny Kristo	Hartford Wolf Pack	1 year, $600,000	
July 2, 2015	Jordan Caron	Colorado Avalanche	1 year, $600,000	
July 2, 2015	Peter Harrold	New Jersey Devils	1 year, $800,000	
July 2, 2015	Kyle Brodziak	Minnesota Wild	1 year, $900,000	
July 6, 2015	Andre Benoit	Buffalo Sabres	1 year, $750,000	
July 7, 2015	Justin Hodgman	Arizona Coyotes	1 year, $575,000	
October 5, 2015	Scottie Upshall	Florida Panthers	1 year, $700,000	
October 7, 2015	Scott Gomez	New Jersey Devils	1 year, $575,000	
November 6, 2015	Martin Havlat	New Jersey Devils	1 year, $600,000	
March 28, 2016	Justin Selman	University of Michigan	2 years, entry-level contract	

=== Free agents lost ===
Date	Player	New team	Contract terms (in U.S. dollars)	Ref
July 1, 2015	Zbynek Michalek	Arizona Coyotes	2 years, $6.4 million	
July 1, 2015	Barret Jackman	Nashville Predators	2 years, $4 million	
July 1, 2015	Brent Regner	Florida Panthers	2 years, $1.2 million	
July 1, 2015	John McCarthy	San Jose Sharks	1 year, $600,000	
August 8, 2015	Chris Porter	Philadelphia Flyers	1 year, $575,000	
August 25, 2015	Adam Cracknell	Vancouver Canucks	1 year, $575,000	
September 1, 2015	Marcel Goc	Adler Mannheim	5 years, value unknown	

=== Lost via waivers ===
Player	New Team	Date Acquired	Ref

=== Lost via retirement ===
Date	Player	Ref

=== Player signings ===
Date	Player	Contract terms (in U.S. dollars)	Ref
June 30, 2015	Jeremy Welsh (F)	1 year, $550,000	
July 1, 2015	Jori Lehtera (C)	3 years, $14.1 million	
July 1, 2015	Chris Butler (D)	1 year, $675,000	
July 1, 2015	Cody Beach (F)	1 year, $575,000	
July 2, 2015	Pat Cannone (F)	1 year, $575,000	
July 2, 2015	Robert Bortuzzo (D)	2 years, $2.1 million	
July 3, 2015	Jake Allen (G)	2 years, $4.7 million	
July 3, 2015	Luke Opilka (G)	3 years, entry-level contract	
July 3, 2015	Dmitrij Jaskin (RW)	1 year, $775,000	
July 7, 2015	Vladimir Tarasenko (RW)	8 years, $60 million	
July 8, 2015	Magnus Paajarvi (LW)	1 year, $700,000	
September 24, 2015	Vince Dunn (D)	3 years, entry-level contract	
March 11, 2016	Carl Gunnarsson (D)	3 years, extension, $8.7 million	
March 30, 2016	Mackenzie MacEachern (F)	2 years, entry-level contract	
March 30, 2016	Adam Musil (F)	3 years, entry-level contract	
April 8, 2016	Joel Edmundson (D)	2 years, extension, $2.1 million	
June 16, 2016	Dmitrij Jaskin (RW)	2 years	
June 22, 2016	Scottie Upshall (RW)	1 year, $900,000	

== Draft picks ==
Below are the St. Louis Blues' selections at the 2015 NHL entry draft, to be held on June 26–27, 2015 at the BB&T Center in Sunrise, Florida.

Round	#	Player	Pos	Nationality	College/Junior/Club team (League)
2	56	Vince Dunn	D	Canada	Niagara IceDogs (OHL)
4	94^{[a]}	Adam Musil	C	Canada	Red Deer Rebels (WHL)
4	116	Glenn Gawdin	C	Canada	Swift Current Broncos (WHL)
5	127^{[b]}	Niko Mikkola	D	Finland	Kalpa Jr. (Finland-Jr.)
5	146	Luke Opilka	G	United States	U.S. NTDP (USHL)
6	176	Liam Dunda	LW	Canada	Owen Sound Attack (OHL)

Draft notes

- The St. Louis Blues' first-round pick went to the Winnipeg Jets as the result of a trade on February 11, 2015, that sent Evander Kane, Zach Bogosian and Jason Kasdorf to Buffalo in exchange for Tyler Myers, Drew Stafford, Joel Armia, Brendan Lemieux and this pick (being conditional at the time of the trade). The condition – Winnipeg will receive the lowest of Buffalo's first-round picks in 2015 – was converted on April 27, 2015, when the Islanders were eliminated from the 2015 Stanley Cup playoffs, ensuring that the Blues' first-round pick would be lower. Buffalo previously acquired this pick as the result of a trade on February 28, 2014, that sent Ryan Miller, Steve Ott and conditional second and third-round picks in 2014 to St. Louis in exchange for Jaroslav Halak, Chris Stewart, William Carrier, a conditional first-round pick in 2014 and this pick.
- The St. Louis Blues' third-round pick went the San Jose Sharks as compensation for Edmonton hiring Todd McLellan as their head coach on May 19, 2015. Edmonton previously acquired this pick as the result of a trade on July 10, 2013, that sent Magnus Paajarvi, a second-round pick in 2014 and a fourth-round pick in 2015 to St. Louis in exchange for David Perron and this pick.
- ^{a} The Edmonton Oilers' fourth-round pick went the St. Louis Blues as the result of a trade on July 10, 2013, that sent David Perron and a third-round pick in 2015 to Edmonton in exchange for Magnus Paajarvi, a second-round pick in 2014 and this pick.
- ^{b} The New Jersey Devils' fifth-round pick went to the St. Louis Blues as the result of a trade on March 22, 2013, that sent Matt D'Agostini and a seventh-round pick in 2015 to New Jersey in exchange for this pick (being conditional at the time of the trade). The condition – If D'Agostini is not re-signed by New Jersey then St. Louis will receive a fifth-round pick in 2015 – was converted on July 10, 2013.
- The St. Louis Blues' seventh-round pick went to the Florida Panthers as the result of a trade on September 28, 2013, that sent Scott Timmins and a sixth-round pick in 2014 to New Jersey in exchange for Krys Barch and this pick. New Jersey previously acquired this pick as the result of a trade on March 22, 2013, that sent a conditional fourth-round pick to St. Louis in exchange for Matt D'Agostini and this pick.
