= 2015–16 Montreal Canadiens season =

NHL hockey team season

2015–16 Montreal Canadiens
- Division: 6th Atlantic
- Conference: 13th Eastern
- 2015–16 record: 38–38–6
- Home record: 22–16–3
- Road record: 16–22–3
- Goals for: 221
- Goals against: 236

Team information
- General manager: Marc Bergevin
- Coach: Michel Therrien
- Captain: Max Pacioretty
- Alternate captains: Brendan Gallagher; Andrei Markov; Tomas Plekanec; P. K. Subban
- Arena: Bell Centre
- Average attendance: 21,288 (100.0%)
- Minor league affiliates: St. John's IceCaps (AHL); Brampton Beast (ECHL)

Team leaders
- Goals: Alex Galchenyuk; Max Pacioretty (30)
- Assists: P. K. Subban (45)
- Points: Max Pacioretty (64)
- Penalty minutes: P. K. Subban (75)
- Plus/minus: Brendan Gallagher (+13)
- Wins: Mike Condon (21)
- Goals against average: Charlie Lindgren (2.00)

The 2015–16 Montreal Canadiens season was the 107th season of the franchise that was founded on December 4, 1909, and their 99th season in the National Hockey League (NHL). The team missed the playoffs for the first time since the 2011–12 season.

== Off-season ==
On September 18, 2015, it was announced that Max Pacioretty was named the 29th captain after a player vote, with Andrei Markov, P. K. Subban, Brendan Gallagher and Tomas Plekanec as alternate captains. Gallagher and Markov will serve as alternates in home games, while Subban and Plekanec serve in road games.

The introduction of rookie goaltender Mike Condon to the main roster also highlighted notable off season moves by the club. After a stellar pre-season performance, Condon was ultimately rewarded for his play, subsequently replacing Dustin Tokarski on the goalie tandem as back-up to starter Carey Price.

== Regular season ==
The team began its regular season on October 7, 2015, against the Toronto Maple Leafs, recording a 3–1 victory. This season also marked the franchise's best start to a campaign with 9 consecutive wins. The Canadiens did not suffer a loss until their 10th game of the season, falling to the Vancouver Canucks' 5–1 on October 27.

Despite this, the notoriety of the 2015–16 Montreal Canadiens season had been the extensive amount of injuries which had plagued members of the main roster. At the forefront of this misfortune was starting goaltender Carey Price, who had suffered a lower-body injury during a 4‒3 loss to the Edmonton Oilers on October 29, 2015. He was sidelined with the injury until November 20 in a 5‒3 win against the New York Islanders after having missed nine games with a 5‒2‒2 record.

However, on November 25, Price re-aggravated his lower-body injury in a 5‒1 victory against the New York Rangers and did not return for the third period. At the time, Price was expected to miss an additional 6 weeks. Ultimately, Price's return did not actualize, and, on April 6, 2016, the Montreal Canadiens announced that Price would not return for the 2015–16 season. The extent of Price's injury was revealed to be a medial collateral ligament injury (MCL sprain).

On November 22, against the New York Islanders, right winger Brendan Gallagher sustained injuries to his fingers after attempting to block a shot. His injuries required surgery and was expected to miss at least six weeks. Gallagher returned for the 2016 Winter Classic in a 5‒1 win against the Boston Bruins and managed a goal and an assist, also receiving the first star of the game.

On March 10, 2016, defenseman P. K. Subban sustained a neck injury after colliding with defenseman Alexei Emelin in a 3–2 win against the Buffalo Sabres. Subban was sent to the hospital as a precautionary measure, but was released the following day with a non-serious injury. On April 6, the club announced that Subban would miss the last two games of the 2015–16 season.

Other notable injuries included those to defencemen Tom Gilbert, Jeff Petry, as well as Nathan Beaulieu. Due to the magnitude of sidelined players, many prospects had gained the opportunity to draw select time in the lineup, with Michael McCarron, Morgan Ellis, Joel Hanley, Darren Dietz, Daniel Carr, Charles Hudon, Brett Lernout, Ryan Johnston, and goaltender Charlie Lindgren all making their respective NHL debuts at some point throughout the season.

The latter half of the Canadiens' season saw them face their worst slump since the 1939-40 season. With this, Montreal missed the playoffs for the first time since 2012. Similarly, no Canadian team in the NHL made the playoffs that year, marking the first time since 1970 that all Canadian franchises failed to qualify for the postseason.

== Standings ==
Atlantic Division
Pos	Team	GP	W	L	OTL	ROW	GF	GA	GD	Pts
1	y – Florida Panthers	82	47	26	9	40	239	203	+36	103
2	x – Tampa Bay Lightning	82	46	31	5	43	227	201	+26	97
3	x – Detroit Red Wings	82	41	30	11	39	211	224	−13	93
4	Boston Bruins	82	42	31	9	38	240	230	+10	93
5	Ottawa Senators	82	38	35	9	32	236	247	−11	85
6	Montreal Canadiens	82	38	38	6	33	221	236	−15	82
7	Buffalo Sabres	82	35	36	11	33	201	222	−21	81
8	Toronto Maple Leafs	82	29	42	11	23	198	246	−48	69

Source: National Hockey League
x – Clinched playoff spot; y – Clinched division

Eastern Conference Wild Card
Pos	Div	Team	GP	W	L	OTL	ROW	GF	GA	GD	Pts
1	ME	x – New York Islanders	82	45	27	10	40	232	216	+16	100
2	ME	x – Philadelphia Flyers	82	41	27	14	38	214	218	−4	96
3	AT	Boston Bruins	82	42	31	9	38	240	230	+10	93
4	ME	Carolina Hurricanes	82	35	31	16	33	198	226	−28	86
5	AT	Ottawa Senators	82	38	35	9	32	236	247	−11	85
6	ME	New Jersey Devils	82	38	36	8	36	184	208	−24	84
7	AT	Montreal Canadiens	82	38	38	6	33	221	236	−15	82
8	AT	Buffalo Sabres	82	35	36	11	33	201	222	−21	81
9	ME	Columbus Blue Jackets	82	34	40	8	28	219	252	−33	76
10	AT	Toronto Maple Leafs	82	29	42	11	23	198	246	−48	69

Source: National Hockey League
x – Clinched playoff spot

== Schedule and results ==
=== Pre-season ===
2015 preseason game log: 2–3–2 (Home: 1–2–2; Road: 1–1–0)
#	Date	Visitor	Score	Home	OT	Decision	Attendance	Record	Recap
1	September 22	Toronto	2–1	Montreal	OT	Fucale	21,287	0–0–1	Recap
2	September 24	Washington	4–3	Montreal	SO	Condon	21,287	0–0–2	Recap
3	September 25	Chicago	5–1	Montreal		Price	21,287	0–1–2	Recap
4	September 26	Montreal	1–0	Toronto		Condon	17,992	1–1–2	Recap
5^{[a]}	September 28	Pittsburgh	1–4	Montreal		Price	18,259	2–1–2	Recap
6	October 1	Ottawa	5–2	Montreal		Price	21,287	2–2–2	Recap
7	October 3	Montreal	4–5	Ottawa		Tokarski	17,912	2–3–2	Recap
Notes:^{a} Game was played at the Videotron Centre in Quebec City, Quebec.

=== Regular season ===
2015–16 game log

October: 10–2–0 (Home: 4–0–0; Road: 6–2–0)
#	Date	Visitor	Score	Home	OT	Decision	Attendance	Record	Pts	Recap
1	October 7	Montreal	3–1	Toronto		Price	19,241	1–0–0	2	Recap
2	October 10	Montreal	4–2	Boston		Price	17,565	2–0–0	4	Recap
3	October 11	Montreal	3–1	Ottawa		Condon	19,177	3–0–0	6	Recap
4	October 13	Montreal	3–2	Pittsburgh		Price	18,626	4–0–0	8	Recap
5	October 15	NY Rangers	0–3	Montreal		Price	21,288	5–0–0	10	Recap
6	October 17	Detroit	1–4	Montreal		Price	21,288	6–0–0	12	Recap
7	October 20	St. Louis	0–3	Montreal		Price	21,288	7–0–0	14	Recap
8	October 23	Montreal	7–2	Buffalo		Condon	18,214	8–0–0	16	Recap
9	October 24	Toronto	3–5	Montreal		Price	21,288	9–0–0	18	Recap
10	October 27	Montreal	1–5	Vancouver		Price	18,570	9–1–0	18	Recap
11	October 29	Montreal	3–4	Edmonton		Price	16,839	9–2–0	18	Recap
12	October 30	Montreal	6–2	Calgary		Condon	19,289	10–2–0	20	Recap

November: 8–2–3 (Home: 5–2–2; Road: 3–0–1)
#	Date	Visitor	Score	Home	OT	Decision	Attendance	Record	Pts	Recap
13	November 1	Winnipeg	1–5	Montreal		Condon	21,288	11–2–0	22	Recap
14	November 3	Ottawa	2–1	Montreal	OT	Condon	21,288	11–2–1	23	Recap
15	November 5	NY Islanders	1–4	Montreal		Condon	21,288	12–2–1	25	Recap
16	November 7	Boston	2–4	Montreal		Condon	21,288	13–2–1	27	Recap
17	November 11	Montreal	3–4	Pittsburgh	SO	Condon	18,455	13–2–2	28	Recap
18	November 14	Colorado	6–1	Montreal		Condon	21,288	13–3–2	28	Recap
19	November 16	Vancouver	3–4	Montreal	OT	Condon	21,288	14–3–2	30	Recap
20	November 19	Arizona	3–2	Montreal		Condon	21,288	14–4–2	30	Recap
21	November 20	Montreal	5–3	NY Islanders		Price	15,171	15–4–2	32	Recap
22	November 22	NY Islanders	2–4	Montreal		Price	21,288	16–4–2	34	Recap
23	November 25	Montreal	5–1	NY Rangers		Price	18,006	17–4–2	36	Recap
24	November 27	Montreal	3–2	New Jersey	SO	Condon	16,514	18–4–2	38	Recap
25	November 28	New Jersey	3–2	Montreal	OT	Condon	21,288	18–4–3	39	Recap

December: 3–11–0 (Home: 2–4–0; Road: 1–7–0)
#	Date	Visitor	Score	Home	OT	Decision	Attendance	Record	Pts	Recap
26	December 1	Columbus	1–2	Montreal		Condon	21,288	19–4–3	41	Recap
27	December 3	Washington	3–2	Montreal		Condon	21,288	19–5–3	41	Recap
28	December 5	Montreal	2–3	Carolina		Condon	10,687	19–6–3	41	Recap
29	December 9	Boston	3–1	Montreal		Condon	21,288	19–7–3	41	Recap
30	December 10	Montreal	2–3	Detroit		Tokarski	20,027	19–8–3	41	Recap
31	December 12	Ottawa	1–3	Montreal		Tokarski	21,288	20–8–3	43	Recap
32	December 15	San Jose	3–1	Montreal		Tokarski	21,288	20–9–3	43	Recap
33	December 17	Los Angeles	3–0	Montreal		Condon	21,288	20–10–3	43	Recap
34	December 19	Montreal	2–6	Dallas		Condon	18,532	20–11–3	43	Recap
35	December 21	Montreal	1–5	Nashville		Tokarski	17,113	20–12–3	43	Recap
36	December 22	Montreal	1–2	Minnesota		Condon	19,105	20–13–3	43	Recap
37	December 26	Montreal	1–3	Washington		Condon	18,506	20–14–3	43	Recap
38	December 28	Montreal	4–3	Tampa Bay	SO	Condon	19,092	21–14–3	45	Recap
39	December 29	Montreal	1–3	Florida		Scrivens	19,822	21–15–3	45	Recap

January: 3–7–1 (Home: 1–4–0; Road: 2–3–1)
#	Date	Visitor	Score	Home	OT	Decision	Attendance	Record	Pts	Recap
40	January 1	Montreal	5–1	Boston		Condon	67,246	22–15–3	47	Recap
41	January 5	Montreal	3–4	Philadelphia		Scrivens	19,163	22–16–3	47	Recap
42	January 6	New Jersey	1–2	Montreal		Condon	21,288	23–16–3	49	Recap
43	January 9	Pittsburgh	3–1	Montreal		Condon	21,288	23–17–3	49	Recap
44	January 14	Chicago	2–1	Montreal		Condon	21,288	23–18–3	49	Recap
45	January 16	Montreal	3–4	St. Louis	OT	Condon	19,501	23–18–4	50	Recap
46	January 17	Montreal	2–5	Chicago		Scrivens	22,030	23–19–4	50	Recap
47	January 19	Boston	4–1	Montreal		Condon	21,288	23–20–4	50	Recap
48	January 23	Montreal	3–2	Toronto	SO	Condon	19,807	24–20–4	52	Recap
49	January 25	Montreal	2–5	Columbus		Condon	11,927	24–21–4	52	Recap
50	January 26	Columbus	5–2	Montreal		Scrivens	21,288	24–22–4	52	Recap

February: 6–6–1 (Home: 5–1–1; Road: 1–5–0)
#	Date	Visitor	Score	Home	OT	Decision	Attendance	Record	Pts	Recap
51	February 2	Montreal	2–4	Philadelphia		Condon	19,031	24–23–4	52	Recap
52	February 3	Buffalo	4–2	Montreal		Condon	21,288	24–24–4	52	Recap
53	February 6	Edmonton	1–5	Montreal		Scrivens	21,288	25–24–4	54	Recap
54	February 7	Carolina	1–2	Montreal	SO	Scrivens	21,288	26–24–4	56	Recap
55	February 9	Tampa Bay	2–4	Montreal		Scrivens	21,288	27–24–4	58	Recap
56	February 12	Montreal	4–6	Buffalo		Condon	18,505	27–25–4	58	Recap
57	February 15	Montreal	2–6	Arizona		Condon	14,338	27–26–4	58	Recap
58	February 17	Montreal	2–3	Colorado		Scrivens	16,271	27–27–4	58	Recap
59	February 19	Philadelphia	2–3	Montreal	SO	Condon	21,288	28–27–4	60	Recap
60	February 22	Nashville	2–1	Montreal	SO	Condon	21,288	28–27–5	61	Recap
61	February 24	Montreal	4–3	Washington		Condon	18,506	29–27–5	63	Recap
62	February 27	Toronto	1–4	Montreal		Condon	21,288	30–27–5	65	Recap
63	February 29	Montreal	2–6	San Jose		Condon	16,205	30–28–5	65	Recap

March: 6–8–1 (Home: 4–4–0; Road: 2–4–1)
#	Date	Visitor	Score	Home	OT	Decision	Attendance	Record	Pts	Recap
64	March 2	Montreal	2–3	Anaheim	SO	Condon	15,273	30–28–6	66	Recap
65	March 3	Montreal	2–3	Los Angeles		Scrivens	18,230	30–29–6	66	Recap
66	March 5	Montreal	2–4	Winnipeg		Condon	15,294	30–30–6	66	Recap
67	March 8	Dallas	3–4	Montreal	OT	Scrivens	21,288	31–30–6	68	Recap
68	March 10	Buffalo	2–3	Montreal		Condon	21,288	32–30–6	70	Recap
69	March 12	Minnesota	4–1	Montreal		Condon	21,288	32–31–6	70	Recap
70	March 15	Florida	4–1	Montreal		Condon	21,288	32–32–6	70	Recap
71	March 16	Montreal	3–2	Buffalo	OT	Scrivens	18,815	33–32–6	72	Recap
72	March 19	Montreal	0–5	Ottawa		Scrivens	19,722	33–33–6	72	Recap
73	March 20	Calgary	4–1	Montreal		Condon	21,288	33–34–6	72	Recap
74	March 22	Anaheim	3–4	Montreal		Condon	21,288	34–34–6	74	Recap
75	March 24	Montreal	3–4	Detroit		Scrivens	20,027	34–35–6	74	Recap
76	March 26	NY Rangers	5–2	Montreal		Condon	21,288	34–36–6	74	Recap
77	March 29	Detroit	3–4	Montreal		Condon	21,288	35–36–6	76	Recap
78	March 31	Montreal	3–0	Tampa Bay		Condon	19,092	36–36–6	78	Recap

April: 2–2–0 (Home: 1–1–0; Road: 1–1–0)
#	Date	Visitor	Score	Home	OT	Decision	Attendance	Record	Pts	Recap
79	April 2	Montreal	3–4	Florida		Condon	17,427	36–37–6	78	Recap
80	April 5	Florida	4–1	Montreal		Condon	21,288	36–38–6	78	Recap
81	April 7	Montreal	4–2	Carolina		Lindgren	15,120	37–38–6	80	Recap
82	April 9	Tampa Bay	2–5	Montreal		Condon	21,288	38–38–6	82	Recap

Legend: Win (2 points) Loss (0 points) Overtime/shootout loss (1 point)

== Player statistics ==
Final stats

=== Skaters ===
Regular season
Player	GP	G	A	Pts	+/−	PIM
Max Pacioretty	82	30	34	64	−10	34
Alex Galchenyuk	82	30	26	56	−8	20
Tomas Plekanec	82	14	40	54	4	36
P. K. Subban	68	6	45	51	4	75
Andrei Markov	82	5	39	44	−6	38
Brendan Gallagher	53	19	21	40	13	24
David Desharnais	65	11	18	29	−6	20
Dale Weise^{‡}	56	14	12	26	0	22
Lars Eller	79	13	13	26	−13	28
Tomas Fleischmann^{‡}	57	10	10	20	−1	28
Torrey Mitchell	71	11	8	19	2	51
Nathan Beaulieu	64	2	17	19	−6	55
Paul Byron	62	11	7	18	−9	11
Sven Andrighetto	44	7	10	17	1	6
Jeff Petry	51	5	11	16	−6	16
Devante Smith-Pelly^{‡}	46	6	6	12	−2	22
Alexei Emelin	72	0	12	12	−7	71
Brian Flynn	56	4	6	10	−3	6
Mark Barberio	30	2	8	10	0	6
Daniel Carr	23	6	3	9	0	8
Greg Pateryn	38	1	6	7	−8	49
Joel Hanley	10	0	6	6	0	0
Phillip Danault^{†}	21	3	2	5	−2	8
Darren Dietz	13	1	4	5	−1	13
Alexander Semin^{‡}	15	1	3	4	1	12
Michael McCarron	20	1	1	2	−10	37
Tom Gilbert	45	1	1	2	3	12
Mike Brown^{†}	14	1	1	2	−2	27
Lucas Lessio	12	1	1	2	1	2
Charles Hudon	3	0	2	2	2	0
Christian Thomas^{‡}	5	0	2	2	1	2
Stefan Matteau^{†}	12	0	1	1	−4	4
Jacob de la Rose	22	0	1	1	−6	6
Bud Holloway	1	0	0	0	0	0
Victor Bartley^{†}	9	0	0	0	3	6
John Scott^{†}	1	0	0	0	−1	2
Morgan Ellis	3	0	0	0	0	2
Brett Lernout	1	0	0	0	0	0
Ryan Johnston	3	0	0	0	1	0
Jarred Tinordi^{‡}	3	0	0	0	−3	5

=== Goaltenders ===
Regular season
Player	GP	GS	TOI	W	L	OT	GA	GAA	SA	SV%	SO	G	A	PIM
Mike Condon	55	51	3,122:44	21	25	6	141	2.71	1458	.903	1	0	0	0
Carey Price	12	12	698:20	10	2	0	24	2.06	365	.934	2	0	0	0
Ben Scrivens	15	14	821:58	5	8	0	42	3.07	447	.906	0	0	0	0
Charlie Lindgren	1	1	60:00	1	0	0	2	2.00	28	.929	0	0	0	0
Dustin Tokarski^{‡}	6	4	226:10	1	3	0	12	3.18	98	.878	0	0	0	0

^{†}Denotes player spent time with another team before joining Canadiens. Stats reflect time with Canadiens only.
^{‡}Traded mid-season. Stats reflect time with Canadiens only.

== Suspensions/fines ==
Player	Explanation	Length	Salary	Date issued	Ref
Zack Kassian	Suspended indefinitely for violating the terms of the NHL/NHLPA Substance Abuse and Behavioral Health Program	2 months	N/A	October 5, 2015	

== Awards and honours ==
=== Awards ===
Regular season
Player	Award	Awarded	Ref
Carey Price	NHL First Star of the Week	October 19, 2015	
Andrei Markov	NHL Second Star of the Week	October 26, 2015	
Carey Price	NHL Second Star of the Month	November 2, 2015	
Mike Condon	NHL Third Star of the Week	November 9, 2015	
Alex Galchenyuk	NHL Third Star of the Week	November 30, 2015	
P. K. Subban	NHL All-Star Game selection	January 6, 2016	
John Scott	NHL First Star of the Week	February 1, 2016	
Mike Condon	NHL Third Star of the Week	February 29, 2016	

=== Milestones ===
Regular season
Player	Milestone	Reached	Ref
Max Pacioretty	400th Career NHL Game	October 7, 2015	
Tomas Plekanec	500th Career NHL Point	October 10, 2015	
Mike Condon	1st Career NHL Game; 1st Career NHL Win	October 11, 2015	
Alex Galchenyuk	200th Career NHL Game	October 20, 2015	
Andrei Markov	500th Career NHL Point	October 23, 2015	
Tomas Plekanec	300th Career NHL Assist	October 23, 2015	
Tom Gilbert	600th Career NHL Game	October 23, 2015	
Dale Weise	1st Career NHL Hat-trick	October 31, 2015	
Nathan Beaulieu	100th Career NHL Game	November 1, 2015	
Tomas Fleischmann	600th Career NHL Game	November 16, 2015	
Max Pacioretty	300th Career NHL Point	November 23, 2015	
Bud Holloway	1st Career NHL Game	November 27, 2015	
Daniel Carr	1st Career NHL Game; 1st Career NHL Goal; 1st Career NHL Point	December 5, 2015	
Daniel Carr	1st Career NHL Assist	December 10, 2015	
Charles Hudon	1st Career NHL Game; 1st Career NHL Assist; 1st Career NHL Point	December 10, 2015	
Brian Flynn	200th Career NHL Game	December 15, 2015	
Michael McCarron	1st Career NHL Game	December 19, 2015	
Dale Weise	300th Career NHL Game	January 17, 2016	
Torrey Mitchell	500th Career NHL Game	February 7, 2016	
Michael McCarron	1st Career NHL Assist; 1st Career NHL Point	February 27, 2016	
Greg Pateryn	1st Career NHL Assist; 1st Career NHL Point	February 27, 2016	
Morgan Ellis	1st Career NHL Game	March 2, 2016	
Darren Dietz	1st Career NHL Game	March 12, 2016	
Greg Pateryn	1st Career NHL Goal	March 16, 2016	
Mike Brown	400th Career NHL Game	March 18, 2016	
Joel Hanley	1st Career NHL Game	March 20, 2016	
Michael McCarron	1st Career NHL Goal	March 20, 2016	
Joel Hanley	1st Career NHL Assist; 1st Career NHL Point	March 22, 2016	
Darren Dietz	1st Career NHL Assist; 1st Career NHL Point	March 22, 2016	
Mike Condon	1st Career Shutout	March 31, 2016	
David Desharnais	400th Career NHL Game	March 31, 2016	
Alexei Emelin	300th Career NHL Game	March 31, 2016	
Brett Lernout	1st Career NHL Game	April 2, 2016	
Ryan Johnston	1st Career NHL Game	April 5, 2016	
Charlie Lindgren	1st Career NHL Game; 1st Career NHL Win	April 7, 2016	
Darren Dietz	1st Career NHL Goal	April 7, 2016	
Paul Byron	200th Career NHL Game	April 9, 2016	

== Transactions ==
The Canadiens have been involved in the following transactions during the 2015–16 season:

=== Trades ===
Date	Details		Ref
July 1, 2015	To Vancouver Canucks Brandon Prust	To Montreal Canadiens Zack Kassian; 5th-round pick in 2016
December 15, 2015	To Arizona Coyotes Christian Thomas	To Montreal Canadiens Lucas Lessio
December 28, 2015	To Edmonton Oilers Zack Kassian	To Montreal Canadiens Ben Scrivens
January 7, 2016	To Anaheim Ducks Dustin Tokarski	To Montreal Canadiens Max Friberg
January 15, 2016	To Arizona Coyotes Jarred Tinordi; Stefan Fournier	To Montreal Canadiens Victor Bartley; John Scott
February 26, 2016	To Chicago Blackhawks Dale Weise; Tomas Fleischmann	To Montreal Canadiens Phillip Danault; 2nd-round pick in 2018
February 29, 2016	To New Jersey Devils Devante Smith-Pelly	To Montreal Canadiens Stefan Matteau

=== Free agents acquired ===
Date	Player	Former team	Contract terms (in U.S. dollars)	Ref
July 1, 2015	Joel Hanley	Portland Pirates	1 year, two-way contract	
July 1, 2015	Mark Barberio	Tampa Bay Lightning	1 year, two-way contract	
July 1, 2015	Bud Holloway	SC Bern	1 year, two-way contract	
July 13, 2015	Ryan Johnston	Colgate University Raiders	2 years, two-way contract	
July 24, 2015	Alexander Semin	Carolina Hurricanes	1 year, $1.1 million	
October 4, 2015	Tomas Fleischmann	Anaheim Ducks	1 year, $750,000	
March 26, 2016	Tom Parisi	Providence Friars	2 years, two-way contract	
March 30, 2016	Charlie Lindgren	St. Cloud State Huskies	2 years, two-way contract	

=== Free agents lost ===
Date	Player	New team	Contract terms (in U.S. dollars)	Ref
May 8, 2015	Magnus Nygren	Färjestad BK	1 year	
June 19, 2015	Joey MacDonald	Schwenninger Wild Wings	1 year	
July 1, 2015	P. A. Parenteau	Toronto Maple Leafs	1 year, $1.5 million	
July 1, 2015	Davis Drewiske	Philadelphia Flyers	1 year, two-way contract	
July 8, 2015	Eric Tangradi	Detroit Red Wings	1 year, $575,000	
October 12, 2015	Drayson Bowman	Colorado Eagles	1 year	
December 3, 2015	Manny Malhotra	Lake Erie Monsters	1 year	

=== Claimed via waivers ===
Player	Previous team	Date	Ref
Paul Byron	Calgary Flames	October 6, 2015	
Mike Brown	San Jose Sharks	February 29, 2016	

=== Lost via release ===
Player	Date	Ref
Alexander Semin	December 10, 2015	

=== Player signings ===
Date	Player	Contract terms (in U.S. dollars)	Ref
June 30, 2015	Brian Flynn	2 years, $1.9 million contract extension	
July 1, 2015	Greg Pateryn	2 years, $1.6 million contract extension	
July 2, 2015	Christian Thomas	1 year, two-way contract extension	
July 9, 2015	Noah Juulsen	3 years, entry-level contract	
July 14, 2015	Michael Bournival	1 year, two-way contract extension	
July 15, 2015	Jarred Tinordi	1 year, two-way contract extension	
July 24, 2015	Daniel Audette	3 years, entry-level contract	
July 30, 2015	Alex Galchenyuk	2 years, $5.6 million contract extension	
September 24, 2015	Michael McNiven	3 years, entry-level contract	
October 16, 2015	Tomas Plekanec	2 years, $12 million contract extension	
February 23, 2016	Paul Byron	3 years, $3.5 million contract extension	
May 8, 2016	Artturi Lehkonen	3 years, entry-level contract	
May 18, 2016	Martin Reway	3 years, entry-level contract	
June 11, 2016	Sven Andrighetto	1 year, contract extension	
June 13, 2016	Mark Barberio	2 years, $1.5 million contract extension	
June 22, 2016	Joel Hanley	1 year, two-way contract extension	

== Draft picks ==
Below are the Montreal Canadiens' selections at the 2015 NHL entry draft, held on June 26–27, 2015 at the BB&T Center in Sunrise, Florida.

Round	#	Player	Pos	Nationality	College/Junior/Club team (League)
1	26	Noah Juulsen	D	Canada	Everett Silvertips (WHL)
3	87	Lukas Vejdemo	C	Sweden	Djurgårdens IF (SHL)
5	131^{a}	Matthew Bradley	C	Canada	Medicine Hat Tigers (WHL)
6	177	Simon Bourque	D	Canada	Rimouski Océanic (QMJHL)
7	207	Jeremiah Addison	LW	Canada	Ottawa 67's (OHL)

=== Notes ===
- The Montreal Canadiens' second-round pick went to the Edmonton Oilers as the result of a trade on March 2, 2015, that sent Jeff Petry to Montreal in exchange for a conditional fifth-round pick in 2015 and this pick.
- The Montreal Canadiens' fourth-round pick went to the Edmonton Oilers as the result of a trade on March 2, 2015, that sent Jeff Petry to Montreal in exchange for a second-round pick in 2015 and this pick (being conditional at the time of the trade). The condition – Edmonton will receive a fourth-round pick in 2015 if Montreal advances to the second round of the 2015 Stanley Cup playoffs – was converted on April 26, 2015, when Montreal eliminated Ottawa in first-round of the 2015 Stanley Cup playoffs.
- The Montreal Canadiens' fifth-round pick went to the Florida Panthers as the result of a trade on March 4, 2014, that sent Mike Weaver to Montreal in exchange for this pick.
- ^{a} The Colorado Avalanche's fifth-round pick went to the Montreal Canadiens as the result of a trade on June 30, 2014, that sent Daniel Briere to Colorado in exchange for P. A. Parenteau and this pick.
