= 2015–16 NHL transactions =

The following is a list of all team-to-team transactions that have occurred in the National Hockey League during the 2015–16 NHL season. It lists which team each player has been traded to, signed by, or claimed by, and for which player(s) or draft pick (s), if applicable. Players who have retired are also listed. The 2015–16 trade deadline was on February 29, 2016. Any players traded or claimed off waivers after this date were eligible to play up until, but not in the 2016 Stanley Cup playoffs.

== Retirement ==
Date	Player	Last Team	Ref
June 29, 2015	Patrick Wey	Washington Capitals	
June 30, 2015	Scott Clemmensen	New Jersey Devils	
June 30, 2015	Sheldon Souray	Anaheim Ducks	
July 2, 2015	Martin St. Louis	New York Rangers	
July 9, 2015	Bobby Robins	Boston Bruins	
July 15, 2015	Greg Nemisz	Carolina Hurricanes	
August 17, 2015	Daniel Briere	Colorado Avalanche	
August 31, 2015	Drew Bagnall	Buffalo Sabres	
September 2, 2015	Bryce Salvador	New Jersey Devils	
September 4, 2015	Rich Peverley	Dallas Stars	
September 15, 2015	Simon Gagne	Boston Bruins	
September 17, 2015	Daniel Carcillo	Chicago Blackhawks	
September 20, 2015	Troy Bodie	Toronto Maple Leafs	
October 5, 2015	Mike Weaver	Montreal Canadiens	
October 20, 2015	Curtis Glencross	Washington Capitals	
October 27, 2015	Sergei Gonchar	Montreal Canadiens	
November 3, 2015	Brad Mills	Ottawa Senators	
December 9, 2015	Keith Ballard	Minnesota Wild	
December 30, 2015	Jack Hillen	Carolina Hurricanes	
January 26, 2016	Craig Adams	Pittsburgh Penguins	
February 24, 2016	Scott Hannan	San Jose Sharks	
February 28, 2016	Lubomir Visnovsky	New York Islanders	
March 17, 2016	Brenden Morrow	Tampa Bay Lightning	
April 11, 2016	Cody McCormick	Buffalo Sabres	
April 28, 2016	Colton Orr	Toronto Maple Leafs	
May 25, 2016	Tim Brent	Philadelphia Flyers	
May 26, 2016	Chris Phillips	Ottawa Senators	
June 1, 2016	Grant Clitsome	Winnipeg Jets	
June 21, 2016	Vincent Lecavalier	Los Angeles Kings	

== Contract terminations ==
A team and player may mutually agree to terminate a player's contract at any time.

For more details on contract terminations:

Teams may buy out player contracts (after the conclusion of a season) for a portion of the remaining value of the contract, paid over a period of twice the remaining length of the contract. This reduced number and extended period is applied to the cap hit as well.

- If the player was under the age of 26 at the time of the buyout the player's pay and cap hit will reduced by a factor of 2/3 over the extended period.
- If the player was 26 or older at the time of the buyout the player's pay and cap hit will reduced by a factor of 1/3 over the extended period.
- If the player was 35 or older at the time of signing the contract the player's pay will be reduced by a factor of 1/3, but the cap hit will not be reduced over the extended period.

All players must clear waivers before having a contract terminated. Injured players cannot be bought out.

Date	Name	Previous team	Notes	Ref
June 28, 2015	Richard Clune	Nashville Predators	Buyout	
June 29, 2015	Mike Richards	Los Angeles Kings	Termination^{1}	
June 29, 2015	P.A. Parenteau	Montreal Canadiens	Buyout	
June 29, 2015	Mark Fistric	Anaheim Ducks	Buyout	
June 30, 2015	Viktor Stalberg	Nashville Predators	Buyout	
June 30, 2015	Cody Hodgson	Buffalo Sabres	Buyout	
June 30, 2015	Stephen Weiss	Detroit Red Wings	Buyout	
July 1, 2015	Alexander Semin	Carolina Hurricanes	Buyout	
July 1, 2015	Brad Boyes	Florida Panthers	Buyout	
July 30, 2015	Dainius Zubrus	New Jersey Devils	Buyout	
August 24, 2015	Jeremie Blain	Vancouver Canucks	Mutual termination	
October 8, 2015	Tom Nilsson	New York Islanders	Mutual termination	
October 9, 2015	Mikko Vainonen	Nashville Predators	Mutual termination	
October 17, 2015	Louis Leblanc	New York Islanders	Mutual termination	
November 4, 2015	Austin Madaisky	Columbus Blue Jackets	Mutual termination	
November 13, 2015	Martin Havlat	St. Louis Blues	Mutual termination	
November 18, 2015	Petr Zamorsky	New York Rangers	Mutual termination	
December 4, 2015	Steve Moses	Nashville Predators	Mutual termination	
December 10, 2015	Alexander Semin	Montreal Canadiens	Mutual termination	
December 20, 2015	Marek Tvrdon	Detroit Red Wings	Mutual termination	
December 30, 2015	Justin Hodgman	St. Louis Blues	Mutual termination	
January 1, 2016	Scott Gomez	St. Louis Blues	Mutual termination	
January 17, 2016	Konrad Abeltshauser	St. Louis Blues	Mutual termination	
May 14, 2016	Sebastian Collberg	New York Islanders	Mutual termination	
June 2016	Christian Marti	Philadelphia Flyers	Mutual termination	
June 16, 2016	R.J. Umberger	Philadelphia Flyers	Buyout	
June 16, 2016	Jared Cowen	Toronto Maple Leafs	Buyout^{2}	

1. Richards appealed the contract termination, and on October 9, 2015, Richards and the Kings settled, officially ending Richards' contract with the team.
2. Cowen appealed the buyout, and on December 7, 2016, an independent arbitrator sided with the Maple Leafs, officially ending Cowen's contract with the team.

== Free agency ==
Note: This does not include players who have re-signed with their previous team as an unrestricted free agent or as a restricted free agent.

Date	Player	New team	Previous team	Ref
July 1, 2015	Matt Hunwick	Toronto Maple Leafs	New York Rangers	
July 1, 2015	Francois Beauchemin	Colorado Avalanche	Anaheim Ducks	
July 1, 2015	Taylor Chorney	Washington Capitals	Pittsburgh Penguins	
July 1, 2015	Thomas Greiss	New York Islanders	Pittsburgh Penguins	
July 1, 2015	Paul Martin	San Jose Sharks	Pittsburgh Penguins	
July 1, 2015	Andrej Sekera	Edmonton Oilers	Los Angeles Kings	
July 1, 2015	Michal Neuvirth	Philadelphia Flyers	New York Islanders	
July 1, 2015	Mark Letestu	Edmonton Oilers	Columbus Blue Jackets	
July 1, 2015	Blake Comeau	Colorado Avalanche	Pittsburgh Penguins	
July 1, 2015	Brad Richardson	Arizona Coyotes	Vancouver Canucks	
July 1, 2015	Steve Downie	Arizona Coyotes	Pittsburgh Penguins	
July 1, 2015	Michael Frolik	Calgary Flames	Winnipeg Jets	
July 1, 2015	Anders Lindback	Arizona Coyotes	Buffalo Sabres	
July 1, 2015	Zbynek Michalek	Arizona Coyotes	St. Louis Blues	
July 1, 2015	Matt Bartkowski	Vancouver Canucks	Boston Bruins	
July 1, 2015	Barret Jackman	Nashville Predators	St. Louis Blues	
July 1, 2015	Jhonas Enroth	Los Angeles Kings	Dallas Stars	
July 1, 2015	Mike McKenna	Florida Panthers	Arizona Coyotes	
July 1, 2015	P.A. Parenteau	Toronto Maple Leafs	Montreal Canadiens	
July 1, 2015	David Warsofsky	Pittsburgh Penguins	Boston Bruins	
July 1, 2015	Richard Bachman	Vancouver Canucks	Edmonton Oilers	
July 1, 2015	Erik Condra	Tampa Bay Lightning	Ottawa Senators	
July 1, 2015	Raphael Diaz	New York Rangers	Calgary Flames	
July 1, 2015	Matt Lindblad	New York Rangers	Boston Bruins	
July 1, 2015	Jayson Megna	New York Rangers	Pittsburgh Penguins	
July 1, 2015	Cody Hodgson	Nashville Predators	Buffalo Sabres	
July 1, 2015	Sena Acolatse	Florida Panthers	Calgary Flames	
July 1, 2015	Cal O'Reilly	Buffalo Sabres	Vancouver Canucks	
July 1, 2015	Matt Donovan	Buffalo Sabres	New York Islanders	
July 1, 2015	Eric O'Dell	Ottawa Senators	Winnipeg Jets	
July 1, 2015	John Moore	New Jersey Devils	Arizona Coyotes	
July 1, 2015	Zack Stortini	Ottawa Senators	Philadelphia Flyers	
July 1, 2015	Taylor Fedun	Vancouver Canucks	San Jose Sharks	
July 1, 2015	Derek Grant	Calgary Flames	Ottawa Senators	
July 1, 2015	Viktor Stalberg	New York Rangers	Nashville Predators	
July 1, 2015	Mike Kostka	Ottawa Senators	New York Rangers	
July 1, 2015	Brian Gibbons	New York Rangers	Columbus Blue Jackets	
July 1, 2015	Kevin Porter	Pittsburgh Penguins	Detroit Red Wings	
July 1, 2015	Mike Green	Detroit Red Wings	Washington Capitals	
July 1, 2015	Kael Mouillierat	Pittsburgh Penguins	New York Islanders	
July 1, 2015	Cameron Gaunce	Florida Panthers	Dallas Stars	
July 1, 2015	Brent Regner	Florida Panthers	St. Louis Blues	
July 1, 2015	Mark Arcobello	Toronto Maple Leafs	Arizona Coyotes	
July 1, 2015	Zac Dalpe	Minnesota Wild	Buffalo Sabres	
July 1, 2015	Steve Oleksy	Pittsburgh Penguins	Washington Capitals	
July 1, 2015	Brad Richards	Detroit Red Wings	Chicago Blackhawks	
July 1, 2015	Jason Akeson	Buffalo Sabres	Philadelphia Flyers	
July 1, 2015	Carter Camper	Washington Capitals	Ottawa Senators	
July 1, 2015	Sean Collins	Washington Capitals	Columbus Blue Jackets	
July 1, 2015	Aaron Ness	Washington Capitals	New York Islanders	
July 1, 2015	Matt Hackett	Anaheim Ducks	Buffalo Sabres	
July 1, 2015	Chris Mueller	Anaheim Ducks	New York Rangers	
July 1, 2015	Joe Piskula	Anaheim Ducks	Nashville Predators	
July 1, 2015	Chris Conner	Philadelphia Flyers	Washington Capitals	
July 1, 2015	Davis Drewiske	Philadelphia Flyers	Montreal Canadiens	
July 1, 2015	Gregory Campbell	Columbus Blue Jackets	Boston Bruins	
July 1, 2015	Matt Beleskey	Boston Bruins	Anaheim Ducks	
July 1, 2015	Mark Barberio	Montreal Canadiens	Tampa Bay Lightning	
July 1, 2015	Daniel Winnik	Toronto Maple Leafs	Pittsburgh Penguins	
July 1, 2015	Dustin Jeffrey	Arizona Coyotes	New York Islanders	
July 1, 2015	Antoine Vermette	Arizona Coyotes	Chicago Blackhawks	
July 1, 2015	Shawn Horcoff	Anaheim Ducks	Dallas Stars	
July 1, 2015	Joe Whitney	New York Islanders	New Jersey Devils	
July 1, 2015	John McCarthy	San Jose Sharks	St. Louis Blues	
July 1, 2015	Justin Williams	Washington Capitals	Los Angeles Kings	
July 1, 2015	Mike Reilly	Minnesota Wild	Columbus Blue Jackets	
July 2, 2015	Justin Florek	New York Islanders	Boston Bruins	
July 2, 2015	Ben Holmstrom	New York Islanders	Carolina Hurricanes	
July 2, 2015	Cameron Schilling	Chicago Blackhawks	Washington Capitals	
July 2, 2015	Andrew Bodnarchuk	Columbus Blue Jackets	Los Angeles Kings	
July 2, 2015	Danny Kristo	St. Louis Blues	New York Rangers	
July 2, 2015	Rob Flick	Florida Panthers	Boston Bruins	
July 2, 2015	Conor Allen	Nashville Predators	New York Rangers	
July 2, 2015	Brett Gallant	Columbus Blue Jackets	New York Islanders	
July 2, 2015	Chris Bourque	Washington Capitals	New York Rangers	
July 2, 2015	Will O'Neill	Pittsburgh Penguins	Winnipeg Jets	
July 2, 2015	Jordan Caron	St. Louis Blues	Colorado Avalanche	
July 2, 2015	Tyson Strachan	Minnesota Wild	Buffalo Sabres	
July 2, 2015	Bobby Sanguinetti	Buffalo Sabres	Vancouver Canucks	
July 2, 2015	Matt Fraser	Winnipeg Jets	Edmonton Oilers	
July 2, 2015	Jason LaBarbera	Philadelphia Flyers	Anaheim Ducks	
July 2, 2015	Mark Cundari	San Jose Sharks	Calgary Flames	
July 2, 2015	Peter Harrold	St. Louis Blues	New Jersey Devils	
July 2, 2015	Alex Grant	Arizona Coyotes	Ottawa Senators	
July 2, 2015	Kyle Brodziak	St. Louis Blues	Minnesota Wild	
July 3, 2015	Carlo Colaiacovo	Buffalo Sabres	Philadelphia Flyers	
July 3, 2015	Blair Jones	Vancouver Canucks	Philadelphia Flyers	
July 3, 2015	Andrew MacWilliam	Winnipeg Jets	Toronto Maple Leafs	
July 3, 2015	Colin McDonald	Philadelphia Flyers	New York Islanders	
July 3, 2015	Harry Zolnierczyk	Anaheim Ducks	New York Islanders	
July 3, 2015	John Ramage	Columbus Blue Jackets	Calgary Flames	
July 3, 2015	Luke Adam	New York Rangers	Columbus Blue Jackets	
July 3, 2015	Joel Ward	San Jose Sharks	Washington Capitals	
July 4, 2015	Dan Ellis	Washington Capitals	Florida Panthers	
July 4, 2015	Cody Bass	Nashville Predators	Chicago Blackhawks	
July 6, 2015	Shawn Matthias	Toronto Maple Leafs	Vancouver Canucks	
July 6, 2015	Andre Benoit	St. Louis Blues	Buffalo Sabres	
July 6, 2015	Brandon DeFazio	Boston Bruins	Vancouver Canucks	
July 7, 2015	Justin Hodgman	St. Louis Blues	Arizona Coyotes	
July 8, 2015	Paul Carey	Washington Capitals	Boston Bruins	
July 8, 2015	Eric Tangradi	Detroit Red Wings	Montreal Canadiens	
July 9, 2015	Brian McGrattan	Anaheim Ducks	Calgary Flames	
July 10, 2015	Matt Irwin	Boston Bruins	San Jose Sharks	
July 10, 2015	John Scott	Arizona Coyotes	San Jose Sharks	
July 12, 2015	Chris Stewart	Anaheim Ducks	Minnesota Wild	
July 15, 2015	Johnny Oduya	Dallas Stars	Chicago Blackhawks	
July 15, 2015	Zach Sill	Washington Capitals	Toronto Maple Leafs	
July 16, 2015	Shane O'Brien	Anaheim Ducks	Florida Panthers	
July 17, 2015	Louis Leblanc	New York Islanders	Anaheim Ducks	
July 21, 2015	Tye McGinn	Tampa Bay Lightning	Arizona Coyotes	
July 24, 2015	Ryan Stanton	Washington Capitals	Vancouver Canucks	
July 24, 2015	Alexander Semin	Montreal Canadiens	Carolina Hurricanes	
July 28, 2015	Eric Fehr	Pittsburgh Penguins	Washington Capitals	
August 6, 2015	Matt Cullen	Pittsburgh Penguins	Nashville Predators	
August 8, 2015	Chris Porter	Philadelphia Flyers	St. Louis Blues	
August 10, 2015	Jarret Stoll	New York Rangers	Los Angeles Kings	
August 16, 2015	Robbie Russo	Detroit Red Wings	New York Islanders	
August 17, 2015	Mike Santorelli	Anaheim Ducks	Nashville Predators	
August 23, 2015	Christian Ehrhoff	Los Angeles Kings	Pittsburgh Penguins	
August 24, 2015	Frazer McLaren	San Jose Sharks	Toronto Maple Leafs	
August 25, 2015	Adam Cracknell	Vancouver Canucks	St. Louis Blues	
September 8, 2015	Pierre-Luc Letourneau-Leblond	New Jersey Devils	Pittsburgh Penguins	
September 10, 2015	Cody Franson	Buffalo Sabres	Nashville Predators	
September 10, 2015	David Schlemko	New Jersey Devils	Calgary Flames	
September 16, 2015	Jiri Tlusty	New Jersey Devils	Winnipeg Jets	
September 17, 2015	Steve Bernier	New York Islanders	New Jersey Devils	
September 18, 2015	Marek Zidlicky	New York Islanders	Detroit Red Wings	
September 27, 2015	Brad Boyes	Toronto Maple Leafs	Florida Panthers	
September 28, 2015	Mark Fraser	Ottawa Senators	New Jersey Devils	
September 29, 2015	Andrew Campbell	Toronto Maple Leafs	Arizona Coyotes	
October 2, 2015	Corey Potter	Arizona Coyotes	Calgary Flames	
October 3, 2015	Lee Stempniak	New Jersey Devils	Winnipeg Jets	
October 4, 2015	Tomas Fleischmann	Montreal Canadiens	Anaheim Ducks	
October 4, 2015	Jonas Gustavsson	Boston Bruins	Detroit Red Wings	
October 5, 2015	Scottie Upshall	St. Louis Blues	Florida Panthers	
October 6, 2015	Jack Skille	Colorado Avalanche	Columbus Blue Jackets	
October 7, 2015	Scott Gomez	St. Louis Blues	New Jersey Devils	
October 9, 2015	Peter Budaj	Los Angeles Kings	Winnipeg Jets	
October 29, 2015	Rich Clune	Toronto Maple Leafs	Nashville Predators	
November 6, 2015	Martin Havlat	St. Louis Blues	New Jersey Devils	
November 24, 2015	Dainius Zubrus	San Jose Sharks	New Jersey Devils	
November 27, 2015	Tyler Kennedy	New Jersey Devils	New York Islanders	
January 6, 2016	Mike Richards	Washington Capitals	Los Angeles Kings	
January 21, 2016	Daniel Paille	New York Rangers	Boston Bruins	
February 1, 2016	Tom Sestito	Pittsburgh Penguins	Vancouver Canucks	
March 2, 2016	Scott Gomez	Ottawa Senators	St. Louis Blues	
May 26, 2016	Tom Nilsson	Vancouver Canucks	New York Islanders	

=== Imports ===
This section is for players who were not previously on contract with NHL teams in the past season. Listed is their previous team and the league that they belonged to.

Date	Player	New team	Previous team	League	Ref
July 1, 2015	Shane Harper	Florida Panthers	Chicago Wolves	AHL	
July 1, 2015	Joel Hanley	Montreal Canadiens	Portland Pirates	AHL	
July 1, 2015	T.J. Hensick	Carolina Hurricanes	Hamilton Bulldogs	AHL	
July 1, 2015	Sergei Plotnikov	Pittsburgh Penguins	Lokomotiv Yaroslavl	KHL	
July 1, 2015	Conor Sheary	Pittsburgh Penguins	Wilkes-Barre/Scranton Penguins	AHL	
July 1, 2015	Viktor Tikhonov	Chicago Blackhawks	SKA Saint Petersburg	KHL	
July 1, 2015	Paul Thompson	New Jersey Devils	Albany Devils	AHL	
July 1, 2015	Ruslan Fedotenko	Minnesota Wild	Iowa Wild	AHL	
July 1, 2015	Marc Hagel	Minnesota Wild	Iowa Wild	AHL	
July 1, 2015	Tim Brent	Philadelphia Flyers	Metallurg Magnitogorsk	AHL	
July 1, 2015	Dakota Mermis	Arizona Coyotes	Oshawa Generals	OHL	
July 1, 2015	Bud Holloway	Montreal Canadiens	SC Bern	NLA	
July 1, 2015	Jim O'Brien	New Jersey Devils	Hershey Bears	AHL	
July 2, 2015	Bracken Kearns	New York Islanders	Espoo Blues	Liiga	
July 2, 2015	Justin Vaive	New York Islanders	Hartford Wolf Pack	OHL	
July 2, 2015	James Wright	New York Islanders	Medvescak Zagreb	KHL	
July 2, 2015	Matt Taormina	Tampa Bay Lightning	Worcester Sharks	AHL	
July 2, 2015	Jaime Sifers	Columbus Blue Jackets	Springfield Falcons	AHL	
July 2, 2015	Mike Liambas	Chicago Blackhawks	Milwaukee Admirals	AHL	
July 3, 2015	Byron Froese	Toronto Maple Leafs	Toronto Marlies	AHL	
July 3, 2015	Marc-Andre Gragnani	New Jersey Devils	SC Bern	NLA	
July 3, 2015	Yann Danis	New Jersey Devils	Hartford Wolf Pack	AHL	
July 3, 2015	Eric Selleck	Arizona Coyotes	Portland Pirates	AHL	
July 3, 2015	Derek Smith	Arizona Coyotes	ZSC Lions	NLA	
July 5, 2015	Jeff Tambellini	Tampa Bay Lightning	Vaxjo Lakers	SHL	
July 7, 2015	Kole Sherwood	Columbus Blue Jackets	Ohio Blue Jackets U18	T1EHL	
July 13, 2015	Ryan Johnston	Montreal Canadiens	Colgate Raiders	NCAA	
July 29, 2015	Niklas Treutle	Arizona Coyotes	Red Bull Munchen	DEL	
August 18, 2015	Nolan Valleau	Chicago Blackhawks	Bowling Green Falcons	NCAA	
August 27, 2015	Damir Sharipzyanov	Los Angeles Kings	Owen Sound Attack	OHL	
September 17, 2015	Trevor Murphy	Nashville Predators	Windsor Spitfires	OHL	
September 21, 2015	Philippe Myers	Philadelphia Flyers	Rouyn-Noranda Huskies	QMJHL	
September 23, 2015	Nick Schneider	Calgary Flames	Medicine Hat Tigers	WHL	
September 24, 2015	Michael McNiven	Montreal Canadiens	Owen Sound Attack	OHL	
October 1, 2015	Oleg Yevenko	Columbus Blue Jackets	Cleveland Monsters	AHL	
October 5, 2015	Ken Appleby	New Jersey Devils	Oshawa Generals	OHL	
October 5, 2015	Tim McGauley	Washington Capitals	Brandon Wheat Kings	WHL	
October 6, 2015	Thomas Raffl	Winnipeg Jets	Red Bull Salzburg	EBEL	
October 6, 2015	Braden Christoffer	Edmonton Oilers	Bakersfield Condors	AHL	
October 7, 2015	Cavan Fitzgerald	San Jose Sharks	Halifax Mooseheads	QMJHL	
January 5, 2016	Frederick Gaudreau	Nashville Predators	Milwaukee Admirals	AHL	
January 20, 2016	Mike Zalewski	Vancouver Canucks	Utica Comets	AHL	
March 2, 2016	Dryden Hunt	Florida Panthers	Moose Jaw Warriors	WHL	
March 2, 2016	Jonathon Martin	San Jose Sharks	Swift Current Broncos	WHL	
March 8, 2016	Andrew Poturalski	Carolina Hurricanes	New Hampshire Wildcats	NCAA	
March 8, 2016	Nick Lappin	New Jersey Devils	Brown Bears	NCAA	
March 10, 2016	Dan Renouf	Detroit Red Wings	Maine Black Bears	NCAA	
March 13, 2016	Jere Sallinen	Edmonton Oilers	Jokerit	KHL	
March 21, 2016	Jordan Maletta	Columbus Blue Jackets	Niagara IceDogs	OHL	
March 22, 2016	Casey Nelson	Buffalo Sabres	Minnesota State Mavericks	NCAA	
March 26, 2016	Tom Parisi	Montreal Canadiens	Providence Friars	NCAA	
March 28, 2016	Justin Selman	St. Louis Blues	Michigan Wolverines	NCAA	
March 28, 2016	Adam Carlson	Washington Capitals	Mercyhurst Lakers	NCAA	
March 28, 2016	Kasimir Kaskisuo	Toronto Maple Leafs	Minnesota–Duluth Bulldogs	NCAA	
March 29, 2016	Ethan Prow	Pittsburgh Penguins	St. Cloud State Huskies	NCAA	
March 30, 2016	Charlie Lindgren	Montreal Canadiens	St. Cloud State Huskies	NCAA	
March 30, 2016	Brandon Tanev	Winnipeg Jets	Providence Friars	NCAA	
March 30, 2016	Kalle Kossila	Anaheim Ducks	St. Cloud State Huskies	NCAA	
March 30, 2016	Kevin Boyle	Anaheim Ducks	UMass Lowell River Hawks	NCAA	
April 1, 2016	Macoy Erkamps	Ottawa Senators	Brandon Wheat Kings	WHL	
April 1, 2016	Ray Emery	Philadelphia Flyers	Adler Mannheim	DEL	
April 1, 2016	Adam Chapie	New York Rangers	UMass Lowell River Hawks	NCAA	
April 5, 2016	Alex Lyon	Philadelphia Flyers	Yale Bulldogs	NCAA	
April 7, 2016	Nick Ellis	Edmonton Oilers	Providence Friars	NCAA	
April 11, 2016	Mantas Armalis	San Jose Sharks	Djurgardens IF	SHL	
April 13, 2016	Troy Stecher	Vancouver Canucks	North Dakota Fighting Hawks	NCAA	
April 15, 2016	Sam Anas	Minnesota Wild	Quinnipiac Bobcats	NCAA	
April 15, 2016	Justin Scott	Columbus Blue Jackets	Barrie Colts	OHL	
April 17, 2016	Malte Stromwall	New York Rangers	AIK IF	HA	
April 21, 2016	Adam Payerl	Nashville Predators	Milwaukee Admirals	AHL	
April 22, 2016	Jake Chelios	Carolina Hurricanes	Charlotte Checkers	AHL	
April 27, 2016	Lukas Bengtsson	Pittsburgh Penguins	Frolunda HC	SHL	
April 29, 2016	Daniel Pribyl	Calgary Flames	HC Sparta Praha	ELH	
April 29, 2016	Michael Garteig	Vancouver Canucks	Quinnipiac Bobcats	NCAA	
May 2, 2016	Nikita Zaitsev	Toronto Maple Leafs	CSKA Moscow	KHL	
May 3, 2016	Linus Hultstrom	Florida Panthers	Djurgårdens IF	SHL	
May 7, 2016	Drake Caggiula	Edmonton Oilers	North Dakota Fighting Hawks	NCAA	
May 9, 2016	Patrick Russell	Edmonton Oilers	St. Cloud State Huskies	NCAA	
May 13, 2016	Marcus Sorensen	San Jose Sharks	Djurgardens IF	SHL	
May 16, 2016	Yan-Pavel Laplante	Vancouver Canucks	Gatineau Olympiques	QMJHL	
May 18, 2016	Adam Vay	Minnesota Wild	Debreceni HK	MOL Liga	
May 24, 2016	Tim Heed	San Jose Sharks	Skelleftea AIK	SHL	
May 24, 2016	Lars Johansson	Chicago Blackhawks	Frolunda HC	SHL	
May 24, 2016	Michal Kempny	Chicago Blackhawks	Avangard Omsk	KHL	
May 24, 2016	Martin Lundberg	Chicago Blackhawks	Skelleftea AIK	SHL	
May 24, 2016	Tom Pyatt	Ottawa Senators	Geneve-Servette HC	NLA	
May 27, 2016	Yohann Auvitu	New Jersey Devils	HIFK	Liiga	
June 1, 2016	Jonas Gunnarsson	Nashville Predators	Malmo Redhawks	SHL	
June 10, 2016	David Rittich	Calgary Flames	BK Mlada Boleslav	ELH	

== Trades ==
* Retained Salary Transaction: Each team is allowed up to three contracts on their payroll where they have retained salary in a trade (i.e. the player no longer plays with Team A due to a trade to Team B, but Team A still retains some salary). Only up to 50% of a player's contract can be kept, and only up to 15% of a team's salary cap can be taken up by retained salary. A contract can only be involved in one of these trades twice.

Hover over retained salary or conditional transactions for more information.

=== June ===
June 26, 2015	To Buffalo Sabres Robin Lehner; David Legwand	To Ottawa Senators NYI's 1st-round pick in 2015
June 26, 2015	To Calgary Flames Dougie Hamilton	To Boston Bruins 1st-round pick in 2015; 2nd-round pick in 2015; WSH's 2nd-round pick in 2015
June 26, 2015	To Los Angeles Kings Milan Lucic*	To Boston Bruins Martin Jones; Colin Miller; 1st-round pick in 2015
June 26, 2015	To Buffalo Sabres Ryan O'Reilly; Jamie McGinn	To Colorado Avalanche Nikita Zadorov; Mikhail Grigorenko; J.T. Compher; 2nd-round pick in 2015
June 26, 2015	To Edmonton Oilers Griffin Reinhart	To New York Islanders PIT's 1st-round pick in 2015; 2nd-round pick in 2015
June 26, 2015	To New Jersey Devils Kyle Palmieri	To Anaheim Ducks FLA's 2nd-round pick in 2015 conditional 3rd-round pick in 2016
June 27, 2015	To Carolina Hurricanes Eddie Lack	To Vancouver Canucks 3rd-round pick in 2015; 7th-round pick in 2016
June 27, 2015	To Dallas Stars Antti Niemi	To San Jose Sharks 7th-round pick in 2015
June 27, 2015	To Anaheim Ducks Carl Hagelin; 2nd-round pick in 2015; 6th-round pick in 2015	To New York Rangers Emerson Etem; FLA's 2nd-round pick in 2015
June 27, 2015	To Carolina Hurricanes James Wisniewski	To Anaheim Ducks Anton Khudobin
June 27, 2015	To Edmonton Oilers Cam Talbot; 7th-round pick in 2015	To New York Rangers MTL's 2nd-round pick in 2015; OTT's 3rd-round pick in 2015; 7th-round pick in 2015
June 27, 2015	To San Jose Sharks Patrick McNally	To Vancouver Canucks TBL's 7th-round pick in 2015
June 27, 2015	To Toronto Maple Leafs Martin Marincin	To Edmonton Oilers Brad Ross; PIT's 4th-round pick in 2015
June 27, 2015	To Edmonton Oilers Eric Gryba	To Ottawa Senators Travis Ewanyk; PIT's 4th-round pick in 2015
June 27, 2015	To New York Rangers Antti Raanta	To Chicago Blackhawks Ryan Haggerty
June 27, 2015	To Arizona Coyotes Nicklas Grossmann*; Chris Pronger	To Philadelphia Flyers Sam Gagner conditional 4th-round pick in 2016 or 3rd-round pick in 2017
June 29, 2015	To Boston Bruins Zac Rinaldo	To Philadelphia Flyers 3rd-round pick in 2017
June 29, 2015	To St. Louis Blues Konrad Abeltshauser	To San Jose Sharks conditional 7th-round pick in 2016
June 30, 2015	To San Jose Sharks Martin Jones	To Boston Bruins Sean Kuraly; 1st-round pick in 2016
June 30, 2015	To Columbus Blue Jackets Brandon Saad; Michael Paliotta; Alex Broadhurst	To Chicago Blackhawks Artem Anisimov; Marko Dano; Jeremy Morin; Corey Tropp; 4th-round pick in 2016
June 30, 2015	To Anaheim Ducks Kevin Bieksa	To Vancouver Canucks 2nd-round pick in 2016
June 30, 2015	To Edmonton Oilers Lauri Korpikoski	To Arizona Coyotes Boyd Gordon

Pick-only 2015 NHL entry draft trades
June 26, 2015	To Philadelphia Flyers NSH's 1st-round pick in 2015 (#24 overall)	To Toronto Maple Leafs TBL's 1st-round pick in 2015 (#29 overall); CHI's 2nd-round pick in 2015 (#61 overall)
June 26, 2015	To New York Islanders NYR's 1st-round pick in 2015 (#28 overall)	To Tampa Bay Lightning EDM's 2nd-round pick in 2015 (#33 overall); FLA's 3rd-round pick in 2015 (#72 overall)
June 26, 2015	To Columbus Blue Jackets TBL's 1st-round pick in 2015 (#29 overall)	To Toronto Maple Leafs TOR's 2nd-round pick in 2015 (#34 overall); PHI's 3rd-round pick in 2015 (#68 overall)
June 27, 2015	To San Jose Sharks BUF's 2nd-round pick in 2015 (#31 overall)	To Colorado Avalanche 2nd-round pick in 2015 (#39 overall); COL's 2nd-round pick in 2016; COL's 6th-round pick in 2017
June 27, 2015	To Ottawa Senators 2nd-round pick in 2015 (#36 overall)	To New Jersey Devils DAL's 2nd-round pick in 2015 (#42 overall) conditional 4th-round pick in 2015 (#109 overall) OR 4th-round pick in 2016
June 27, 2015	To Washington Capitals MTL's 2nd-round pick in 2015 (#57 overall)	To New York Rangers Buffalo Sabres's 3rd-round pick in 2015 (#62 overall); 4th-round pick in 2015 (#113 overall)
June 27, 2015	To Calgary Flames NYR's 2nd-round pick in 2015 (#60 overall)	To Arizona Coyotes 3rd-round pick in 2015 (#76 overall); WSH's 3rd-round pick in 2015 (#83 overall)
June 27, 2015	To Los Angeles Kings CBJ's 4th-round pick in 2015 (#99 overall)	To Philadelphia Flyers 4th-round pick in 2015 (#104 overall); 6th-round pick in 2016
June 27, 2015	To Boston Bruins 5th-round pick in 2016	To Minnesota Wild 5th-round pick in 2015 (#135 overall)
June 27, 2015	To New York Islanders MTL's 5th-round pick in 2015 (#147 overall)	To Florida Panthers 5th-round pick in 2016
June 27, 2015	To Edmonton Oilers ANA's 7th-round pick in 2015 (#208 overall)	To Tampa Bay Lightning 7th-round pick in 2016

=== July ===
July 1, 2015	To Pittsburgh Penguins Phil Kessel*; Tim Erixon; Tyler Biggs conditional PIT's 2nd-round pick in 2016 or TOR's 2nd-round pick in 2017	To Toronto Maple Leafs Nick Spaling; Kasperi Kapanen; Scott Harrington conditional 1st-round pick in 2016 or 1st-round pick in 2017 or 2nd-round pick in 2017 NJD's 3rd-round pick in 2016
July 1, 2015	To Montreal Canadiens Zack Kassian; 5th-round pick in 2016	To Vancouver Canucks Brandon Prust
July 1, 2015	To Nashville Predators Max Reinhart	To Calgary Flames conditional 4th-round pick in 2016
July 1, 2015	To New York Rangers Magnus Hellberg	To Nashville Predators 6th-round pick in 2017
July 1, 2015	To Florida Panthers Reilly Smith; Marc Savard	To Boston Bruins Jimmy Hayes
July 2, 2015	To Washington Capitals T.J. Oshie	To St. Louis Blues Troy Brouwer; Pheonix Copley; 3rd-round pick in 2016
July 6, 2015	To Edmonton Oilers Anders Nilsson	To Chicago Blackhawks Liam Coughlin
July 10, 2015	To Dallas Stars Patrick Sharp; Stephen Johns	To Chicago Blackhawks Trevor Daley; Ryan Garbutt*
July 12, 2015	To Toronto Maple Leafs Taylor Beck	To Nashville Predators Jamie Devane
July 28, 2015	To Vancouver Canucks Brandon Sutter; NYI's or VAN's 3rd-round pick in 2016	To Pittsburgh Penguins Nick Bonino; Adam Clendening; ANA's 2nd-round pick in 2016

=== September ===
September 9, 2015	To Colorado Avalanche Brandon Gormley	To Arizona Coyotes Stefan Elliott
September 11, 2015	To Carolina Hurricanes Kris Versteeg; Joakim Nordstrom; 3rd-round pick in 2017	To Chicago Blackhawks Dennis Robertson; Jake Massie; 5th-round pick in 2017
September 17, 2015	To Toronto Maple Leafs Michael Grabner	To New York Islanders Taylor Beck; Matt Finn; Carter Verhaeghe; Tom Nilsson; Christopher Gibson

=== October ===
October 4, 2015	To Calgary Flames Freddie Hamilton	To Colorado Avalanche conditional 7th-round pick in 2016
October 6, 2015	To New Jersey Devils Brian O'Neill	To Los Angeles Kings conditional 7th-round pick in 2017

=== November ===
November 12, 2015	To Calgary Flames Kevin Poulin	To Tampa Bay Lightning future considerations

=== December ===
December 14, 2015	To Chicago Blackhawks Rob Scuderi*	To Pittsburgh Penguins Trevor Daley
December 15, 2015	To Arizona Coyotes Christian Thomas	To Montreal Canadiens Lucas Lessio
December 28, 2015	To Montreal Canadiens Ben Scrivens*	To Edmonton Oilers Zack Kassian

=== January ===
January 3, 2016	To Toronto Maple Leafs Jeremy Morin	To Chicago Blackhawks Richard Panik
January 6, 2016	To Los Angeles Kings Vincent Lecavalier*; Luke Schenn*	To Philadelphia Flyers Jordan Weal; 3rd-round pick in 2016
January 6, 2016	To Nashville Predators Ryan Johansen	To Columbus Blue Jackets Seth Jones
January 7, 2016	To Anaheim Ducks Dustin Tokarski	To Montreal Canadiens Max Friberg
January 8, 2016	To Vancouver Canucks Emerson Etem	To New York Rangers Nicklas Jensen; 6th-round pick in 2017
January 14, 2016	To Ottawa Senators Conor Allen	To Nashville Predators Patrick Mullen
January 15, 2016	To St. Louis Blues Richard Nedomlel	To Detroit Red Wings future considerations
January 15, 2016	To Arizona Coyotes Victor Bartley	To Nashville Predators Stefan Elliott
January 15, 2016	To Montreal Canadiens John Scott; Victor Bartley	To Arizona Coyotes Jarred Tinordi; Stefan Fournier
January 16, 2016	To Anaheim Ducks David Perron; Adam Clendening	To Pittsburgh Penguins Carl Hagelin
January 21, 2016	To Anaheim Ducks Ryan Garbutt	To Chicago Blackhawks Jiri Sekac

=== February ===
February 9, 2016	To Ottawa Senators Dion Phaneuf; Matt Frattin; Casey Bailey; Ryan Rupert; Cody Donaghey	To Toronto Maple Leafs Jared Cowen; Milan Michalek; Colin Greening; Tobias Lindberg; 2nd-round pick in 2017
February 21, 2016	To Colorado Avalanche Shawn Matthias	To Toronto Maple Leafs Colin Smith; 4th-round pick in 2016
February 22, 2016	To San Jose Sharks Roman Polak; Nick Spaling	To Toronto Maple Leafs Raffi Torres; 2nd-round pick in 2017; 2nd-round pick in 2018
February 22, 2016	To Vancouver Canucks Markus Granlund	To Calgary Flames Hunter Shinkaruk
February 23, 2016	To Washington Capitals Mike Weber*	To Buffalo Sabres 3rd-round pick in 2017
February 24, 2016	To Vancouver Canucks Philip Larsen	To Edmonton Oilers conditional 4th or 5th-round pick in 2017
February 25, 2016	To Chicago Blackhawks Andrew Ladd*; Jay Harrison; Matt Fraser	To Winnipeg Jets Marko Dano; 1st-round pick in 2016 conditional 3rd-round pick in 2018
February 26, 2016	To Chicago Blackhawks Christian Ehrhoff*	To Los Angeles Kings Rob Scuderi*
February 26, 2016	To Chicago Blackhawks Tomas Fleischmann; Dale Weise*	To Montreal Canadiens Phillip Danault; 2nd-round pick in 2018
February 27, 2016	To St. Louis Blues Anders Nilsson	To Edmonton Oilers Niklas Lundstrom; 5th-round pick in 2016
February 27, 2016	To San Jose Sharks James Reimer; Jeremy Morin	To Toronto Maple Leafs Alex Stalock; Ben Smith conditional 4th-round pick in 2018
February 27, 2016	To Florida Panthers Jiri Hudler	To Calgary Flames 2nd-round pick in 2016; 4th-round pick in 2018
February 27, 2016	To Florida Panthers Teddy Purcell	To Edmonton Oilers conditional 3rd-round pick in 2016
February 27, 2016	To Florida Panthers Jakub Kindl*	To Detroit Red Wings 6th-round pick in 2017
February 27, 2016	To Pittsburgh Penguins Justin Schultz*	To Edmonton Oilers 3rd-round pick in 2016
February 27, 2016	To Buffalo Sabres Eric O'Dell; Cole Schneider; Michael Sdao; Alex Guptill	To Ottawa Senators Jason Akeson; Phil Varone; Jerome Leduc conditional 7th-round pick in 2016
February 28, 2016	To New York Rangers Eric Staal*	To Carolina Hurricanes Aleksi Saarela; 2nd-round pick in 2016; 2nd-round pick in 2017
February 28, 2016	To Los Angeles Kings Kris Versteeg	To Carolina Hurricanes Valentin Zykov conditional 5th-round pick in 2016
February 28, 2016	To New York Rangers Chris Brown	To Washington Capitals Ryan Bourque
February 28, 2016	To Toronto Maple Leafs Brooks Laich; Connor Carrick; 2nd-round pick in 2016	To Washington Capitals Daniel Winnik; ANA's 5th-round pick in 2016
February 29, 2016	To Arizona Coyotes Sergei Plotnikov	To Pittsburgh Penguins Matthias Plachta conditional 7th-round pick in 2017
February 29, 2016	To Chicago Blackhawks Drew MacIntyre	To Carolina Hurricanes Dennis Robertson
February 29, 2016	To Arizona Coyotes Alex Tanguay; Conner Bleackley; Kyle Wood	To Colorado Avalanche Mikkel Boedker
February 29, 2016	To Colorado Avalanche Eric Gelinas	To New Jersey Devils 3rd-round pick in 2017
February 29, 2016	To Dallas Stars Kris Russell	To Calgary Flames Jyrki Jokipakka; Brett Pollock conditional 2nd-round pick in 2016
February 29, 2016	To Anaheim Ducks Brandon Pirri	To Florida Panthers 6th-round pick in 2016
February 29, 2016	To New York Islanders Shane Prince; 7th-round pick in 2016	To Ottawa Senators conditional 3rd-round pick in 2016
February 29, 2016	To Boston Bruins John-Michael Liles	To Carolina Hurricanes Anthony Camara; 3rd-round pick in 2016; 5th-round pick in 2017
February 29, 2016	To Minnesota Wild Conor Allen	To Ottawa Senators Michael Keranen
February 29, 2016	To Colorado Avalanche Taylor Beck	To New York Islanders Marc-Andre Cliche
February 29, 2016	To New Jersey Devils Devante Smith-Pelly	To Montreal Canadiens Stefan Matteau
February 29, 2016	To Boston Bruins Lee Stempniak	To New Jersey Devils 4th-round pick in 2016; 2nd-round pick in 2017
February 29, 2016	To Anaheim Ducks Jamie McGinn	To Buffalo Sabres conditional 3rd-round pick in 2016
February 29, 2016	To Pittsburgh Penguins Dustin Jeffrey; Dan O'Donoghue; James Melindy	To Arizona Coyotes Matia Marcantuoni
February 29, 2016	To Los Angeles Kings Brett Sutter	To Minnesota Wild Scott Sabourin
February 29, 2016	To Anaheim Ducks Corey Tropp	To Chicago Blackhawks Tim Jackman; 7th-round pick in 2017
February 29, 2016	To Edmonton Oilers Patrick Maroon*	To Anaheim Ducks Martin Gernat; 4th-round pick in 2016
February 29, 2016	To Nashville Predators Corey Potter	To Arizona Coyotes future considerations
February 29, 2016	To Calgary Flames Niklas Backstrom; 6th-round pick in 2016	To Minnesota Wild David Jones

=== March ===
March 4, 2016	To St. Louis Blues Zack Phillips	To Boston Bruins future considerations
March 7, 2016	To Carolina Hurricanes Dane Fox	To Vancouver Canucks future considerations

=== May ===
May 25, 2016	To Vancouver Canucks Erik Gudbranson; NYI's 5th-round pick in 2016	To Florida Panthers Jared McCann; 2nd-round pick in 2016; 4th-round pick in 2016
May 26, 2016	To Detroit Red Wings Dylan Sadowy	To San Jose Sharks 3rd-round pick in 2017

=== June (2016) ===
June 10, 2016	To New Jersey Devils Marc Savard; 2nd-round pick in 2018	To Florida Panthers Paul Thompson; Graham Black
June 15, 2016	To Carolina Hurricanes Teuvo Teravainen; Bryan Bickell	To Chicago Blackhawks NYR's 2nd-round pick in 2016; CHI's 3rd-round pick in 2017
June 16, 2016	To Arizona Coyotes Alex Goligoski	To Dallas Stars 5th-round pick in 2016
June 20, 2016	To San Jose Sharks Maxim Letunov; 6th-round pick in 2017	To Arizona Coyotes 4th-round pick in 2016; DET's 3rd-round pick in 2017
June 20, 2016	To Buffalo Sabres Jimmy Vesey	To Nashville Predators MIN's 3rd-round pick in 2016
June 20, 2016	To Toronto Maple Leafs Frederik Andersen	To Anaheim Ducks PIT's 1st-round pick in 2016 conditional 2nd-round pick in 2017
June 20, 2016	To Florida Panthers Keith Yandle	To New York Rangers 6th-round pick in 2016 conditional 4th-round pick in 2017
June 23, 2016	To Florida Panthers Reto Berra	To Colorado Avalanche Rocco Grimaldi

== Waivers ==
Once an NHL player has played in a certain number of games or a set number of seasons has passed since the signing of his first NHL contract (see here), that player must be offered to all of the other NHL teams before he can be assigned to a minor league affiliate.

Date	Player	New team	Previous team	Ref
September 27, 2015	Kevin Poulin	Tampa Bay Lightning	New York Islanders	
October 1, 2015	Chris Porter	Minnesota Wild	Philadelphia Flyers	
October 6, 2015	Jean-Francois Berube	New York Islanders	Los Angeles Kings	
October 6, 2015	Frank Corrado	Toronto Maple Leafs	Vancouver Canucks	
October 6, 2015	Paul Byron	Montreal Canadiens	Calgary Flames	
October 26, 2015	Bobby Farnham	New Jersey Devils	Pittsburgh Penguins	
November 15, 2015	Chris Wagner	Colorado Avalanche	Anaheim Ducks	
November 22, 2015	Landon Ferraro	Boston Bruins	Detroit Red Wings	
November 22, 2015	Petter Granberg	Nashville Predators	Toronto Maple Leafs	
December 6, 2015	Viktor Tikhonov	Arizona Coyotes	Chicago Blackhawks	
December 15, 2015	Jarret Stoll	Minnesota Wild	New York Rangers	
January 5, 2016	Andrew Bodnarchuk	Colorado Avalanche	Columbus Blue Jackets	
January 13, 2016	Kevin Connauton	Arizona Coyotes	Columbus Blue Jackets	
January 27, 2016	Adam Clendening	Edmonton Oilers	Anaheim Ducks	
February 25, 2016	Chris Wagner	Anaheim Ducks	Colorado Avalanche	
February 27, 2016	Jiri Sekac	Arizona Coyotes	Chicago Blackhawks	
February 29, 2016	Mike Brown	Montreal Canadiens	San Jose Sharks	
February 29, 2016	Adam Cracknell	Edmonton Oilers	Vancouver Canucks	
February 29, 2016	Adam Pardy	Edmonton Oilers	Winnipeg Jets	
February 29, 2016	David Warsofsky	New Jersey Devils	Pittsburgh Penguins	

== Staff compensation ==
Prior to January 1, 2016 NHL teams received compensation for losing a coach, general manager or president of hockey operations to another team while they are still under contract. Teams received a second-round draft pick if a transaction happened during the season and a third-round pick if one occurred in the off-season (a coach's season ends when his team is eliminated from the playoffs, while seasons for GMs and presidents of hockey operations finish after the conclusion of the NHL Draft in June). Teams will have a three-year window to choose from when to lose their draft pick.

Date	Employee	Position	New team	Previous team	Compensation	Ref
July 23, 2015	Lou Lamoriello	General Manager	Toronto Maple Leafs	New Jersey Devils	3rd-round pick in 2018	
October 21, 2015	John Tortorella	Head coach	Columbus Blue Jackets	Vancouver Canucks	2nd-round pick in 2017	

== See also ==
- 2015 NHL entry draft
- 2016 NHL entry draft
- 2017 NHL entry draft
- 2015 in sports
- 2016 in sports
- 2014–15 NHL transactions
- 2016–17 NHL transactions
