= Greg Pateryn =

American ice hockey player (born 1990)

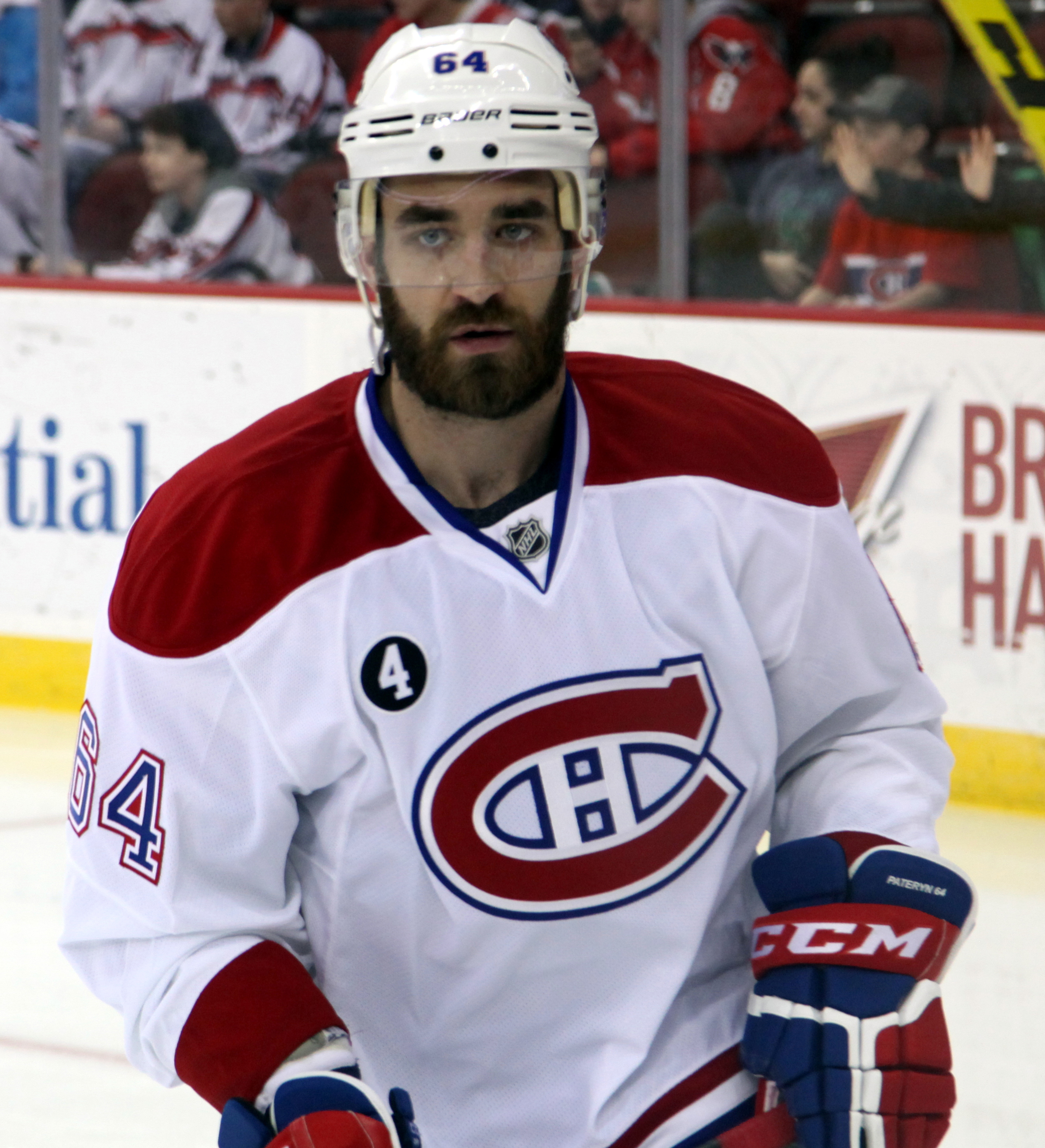
- Pateryn with the Montreal Canadiens in 2015
- Born: June 20, 1990 (age 36) Sterling Heights, Michigan, U.S.
- Height: 6 ft 2 in (188 cm)
- Weight: 221 lb (100 kg; 15 st 11 lb)
- Position: Defense
- Shot: Right
- Played for: Montreal Canadiens; Dallas Stars; Minnesota Wild; Colorado Avalanche; San Jose Sharks; Anaheim Ducks
- NHL draft: 128th overall, 2008; Toronto Maple Leafs
- Playing career: 2012–2022

Gregory Pateryn (born June 20, 1990) is an American former professional ice hockey defenseman. He was selected in the fifth round, 128th overall, by the Toronto Maple Leafs of the National Hockey League (NHL) in the 2008 NHL entry draft and played for the Montreal Canadiens, Dallas Stars, Minnesota Wild, Colorado Avalanche, San Jose Sharks, and Anaheim Ducks.

== Playing career ==
=== Amateur ===
As a youth, Pateryn played in the 2003 Quebec International Pee-Wee Hockey Tournament with the Detroit Little Caesars minor ice hockey team. Pateryn then attended Birmingham Brother Rice High School from 2004 to 2007, where he captained the hockey team. For the 2007–08 season, Pateryn played with the Ohio Junior Blue Jackets in the United States Hockey League. He was later drafted by the Toronto Maple Leafs in the 2008 NHL entry draft after accumulating 27 points in 60 games.

Pateryn then attended the University of Michigan, where he played four seasons of NCAA Division I college hockey with the Wolverines ice hockey team in the Central Collegiate Hockey Association (CCHA).

=== Professional ===
Pateryn's tenure as a prospect within the Maple Leafs was short lived, as on July 2, 2008, he was included in a trade by Toronto along with a second-round selection in the 2010 entry draft to the Montreal Canadiens in exchange for forward Mikhail Grabovski.

On March 28, 2012, the Canadiens signed Pateryn to a two-year, entry-level contract. He made his debut with the Canadiens in the second half of the 2012–13 season, going scoreless in three games.

On May 8, 2014, the Canadiens re-signed Pateryn to a two-year contract extension. This was followed by an additional two-year extension on July 1, 2015.

In the 2016–17 season, Pateryn made the opening night roster, solidifying his role as a depth defender among the Canadiens blueline. Having appeared in 24 games and approaching the NHL trade deadline, Pateryn was dealt by the Canadiens to the Dallas Stars along with a 4th round draft pick in the 2017 NHL entry draft for defenseman Jordie Benn on February 27, 2017.

Pateryn as a free agent in the off-season, left the Stars and signed a three-year, $6.75 million contract with the Minnesota Wild on July 1, 2018.

Entering his final year under contract with the Wild in the pandemic delayed 2020–21 season, Pateryn registered 2 assists through the opening 3 games before he was traded by Minnesota to divisional rival, the Colorado Avalanche, in exchange for Ian Cole on January 19, 2021. He made his Avalanche debut, playing in a third-pairing role in a 4–2 defeat to the Los Angeles Kings on January 21, 2021. Following his third game with Colorado and with the blueline returning to health, Pateryn was placed on waivers by the Avalanche on January 25, 2021. Placed on the club's taxi squad, Pateryn was later reassigned to AHL affiliate, the Colorado Eagles, on February 11, 2021. Selected as interim captain, Pateryn scored the season opening goal in his debut with the Eagles in a 3–2 defeat to the San Diego Gulls on February 13, 2021.

Approaching the trade deadline, having played sparingly between the Avalanche and the Eagles, Pateryn was traded for the second time within the season to the San Jose Sharks along with a 2021 fifth-round selection, in exchange for Devan Dubnyk on April 10, 2021. He was immediately reassigned to join AHL affiliate, the San Jose Barracuda.

With his contract concluded with the Shark in the following off-season, Pateryn as a free agent was signed to add depth to the Anaheim Ducks on a one-year, two-way contract on July 29, 2021. In the 2021–22 season, Pateryn remained on the Ducks roster and made 10 appearances before he was reassigned to captain AHL affiliate, the San Diego Gulls for the remainder of his contract.

As a free agent in the off-season, Pateryn effectively announced his retirement from professional hockey after 10 seasons in accepting a professional scouting role within the Pittsburgh Penguins organization on August 8, 2022.

== Personal life ==
Pateryn is of Ukrainian descent and is fluent in the language.

== Career statistics ==
			Regular season					Playoffs
Season	Team	League	GP	G	A	Pts	PIM	GP	G	A	Pts	PIM
2004–05	Brother Rice High School	HS-MI	29	2	8	10	42	—	—	—	—	—
2005–06	Brother Rice High School	HS-MI	24	0	8	8	34	—	—	—	—	—
2006–07	Brother Rice High School	HS-MI	27	9	19	28	44	—	—	—	—	—
2007–08	Ohio Junior Blue Jackets	USHL	60	3	24	27	145	—	—	—	—	—
2008–09	University of Michigan	CCHA	28	0	5	5	32	—	—	—	—	—
2009–10	University of Michigan	CCHA	33	1	5	6	18	—	—	—	—	—
2010–11	University of Michigan	CCHA	40	3	14	17	28	—	—	—	—	—
2011–12	University of Michigan	CCHA	41	2	13	15	65	—	—	—	—	—
2012–13	Hamilton Bulldogs	AHL	39	7	5	12	27	—	—	—	—	—
2012–13	Montreal Canadiens	NHL	3	0	0	0	0	—	—	—	—	—
2013–14	Hamilton Bulldogs	AHL	68	15	19	34	67	—	—	—	—	—
2014–15	Hamilton Bulldogs	AHL	53	3	12	15	56	—	—	—	—	—
2014–15	Montreal Canadiens	NHL	17	0	0	0	6	7	0	3	3	0
2015–16	Montreal Canadiens	NHL	38	1	6	7	49	—	—	—	—	—
2015–16	St. John's IceCaps	AHL	3	0	0	0	0	—	—	—	—	—
2016–17	Montreal Canadiens	NHL	24	1	5	6	4	—	—	—	—	—
2016–17	Dallas Stars	NHL	12	0	3	3	6	—	—	—	—	—
2017–18	Dallas Stars	NHL	73	1	12	13	50	—	—	—	—	—
2018–19	Minnesota Wild	NHL	80	1	6	7	41	—	—	—	—	—
2019–20	Iowa Wild	AHL	1	0	0	0	2	—	—	—	—	—
2019–20	Minnesota Wild	NHL	20	0	3	3	6	—	—	—	—	—
2020–21	Minnesota Wild	NHL	3	0	2	2	0	—	—	—	—	—
2020–21	Colorado Avalanche	NHL	8	0	0	0	4	—	—	—	—	—
2020–21	Colorado Eagles	AHL	10	3	0	3	10	—	—	—	—	—
2020–21	San Jose Barracuda	AHL	1	0	0	0	0	—	—	—	—	—
2020–21	San Jose Sharks	NHL	2	0	1	1	2	—	—	—	—	—
2021–22	Anaheim Ducks	NHL	10	1	1	2	10	—	—	—	—	—
2021–22	San Diego Gulls	AHL	35	2	10	12	20	—	—	—	—	—
NHL totals			290	5	39	44	178	7	0	3	3	0
