= Brett Lernout =

Canadian ice hockey player

- Born: September 24, 1995 (age 31) Winnipeg, Manitoba, Canada
- Height: 6 ft 4 in (193 cm)
- Weight: 214 lb (97 kg; 15 st 4 lb)
- Position: Defence
- Shoots: Right
- Current team Former teams: Free agent Montreal Canadiens; Hamilton Bulldogs; St. John's IceCaps; Laval Rocket; Chicago Wolves; Colorado Eagles
- NHL draft: 73rd overall, 2014; Montreal Canadiens
- Playing career: 2015–present

Brett Lernout (born September 24, 1995) is a Canadian professional ice hockey defenceman who is currently an unrestricted free agent. He was selected in the third round, 73rd overall, by the Montreal Canadiens in the 2014 NHL entry draft.

== Career ==
In December 2014, he signed a three-year deal with the Canadiens. In 2015 after the end of his junior career with the Saskatoon Blades and the Swift Current Broncos, he reported to the Hamilton Bulldogs (the Canadiens AHL affiliate at the time) and played the last six games of their season.

Lernout played the bulk of the 2015–16 season with the St. John's IceCaps, the Canadiens' new AHL farm team, but was called up after a string of injuries to Canadiens' defencemen. He played his first NHL game on April 2, 2016, but suffered a season-ending injury during his eighth shift. A similar situation caused him to be called up again the next year.

After five seasons within the Canadiens organization, Lenout left as a free agent to sign a one-year, two-way $700,000 contract with the Vegas Golden Knights on July 1, 2019. In the 2019–20 season, Lernout was assigned to AHL affiliate, the Chicago Wolves, after attending the Golden Knights 2019 training camp. He remained with the Wolves for the duration of his contract with the Golden Knights, registering two assists through 38 regular-season games from the blueline before the season was cancelled due to the COVID-19 pandemic.

Having left the Golden Knights as a free agent, Lernout was unsigned leading into the pandemic-delayed 2020–21 season. On February 10, 2021, he was signed to a professional tryout agreement to join the Colorado Eagles of the AHL, the primary affiliate of the Colorado Avalanche. Lernout posted three assists through 12 regular season games before he was released from his tryout on April 18, 2021.

== Career statistics ==
| | | | Regular season | | | | | Playoffs |
| Season | Team | League | GP | G | A | Pts | PIM | GP | G | A | Pts | PIM |
|---|---|---|---|---|---|---|---|---|---|---|---|---|
| 2011–12 | Steinbach Pistons | MJHL | 6 | 0 | 1 | 1 | 0 | — | — | — | — | — |
| 2011–12 | Saskatoon Blades | WHL | 2 | 0 | 0 | 0 | 0 | — | — | — | — | — |
| 2012–13 | Saskatoon Blades | WHL | 18 | 0 | 0 | 0 | 15 | — | — | — | — | — |
| 2012–13 | Swift Current Broncos | WHL | 41 | 1 | 1 | 2 | 28 | 5 | 0 | 0 | 0 | 0 |
| 2013–14 | Swift Current Broncos | WHL | 72 | 8 | 14 | 22 | 103 | 6 | 0 | 1 | 1 | 0 |
| 2014–15 | Swift Current Broncos | WHL | 72 | 14 | 28 | 42 | 68 | 4 | 1 | 0 | 1 | 4 |
| 2014–15 | Hamilton Bulldogs | AHL | 6 | 0 | 0 | 0 | 2 | — | — | — | — | — |
| 2015–16 | St. John's IceCaps | AHL | 69 | 2 | 10 | 12 | 73 | — | — | — | — | — |
| 2015–16 | Montreal Canadiens | NHL | 1 | 0 | 0 | 0 | 0 | — | — | — | — | — |
| 2016–17 | St. John's IceCaps | AHL | 74 | 3 | 13 | 16 | 63 | 4 | 0 | 1 | 1 | 2 |
| 2016–17 | Montreal Canadiens | NHL | 2 | 0 | 0 | 0 | 0 | — | — | — | — | — |
| 2017–18 | Laval Rocket | AHL | 56 | 1 | 7 | 8 | 33 | — | — | — | — | — |
| 2017–18 | Montreal Canadiens | NHL | 18 | 0 | 1 | 1 | 6 | — | — | — | — | — |
| 2018–19 | Laval Rocket | AHL | 74 | 4 | 5 | 9 | 41 | — | — | — | — | — |
| 2019–20 | Chicago Wolves | AHL | 38 | 0 | 2 | 2 | 25 | — | — | — | — | — |
| 2020–21 | Colorado Eagles | AHL | 12 | 0 | 3 | 3 | 6 | — | — | — | — | — |
| NHL totals | | | 21 | 0 | 1 | 1 | 6 | — | — | — | — | — |
