= Mark Barberio =

Canadian ice hockey player (born 1990)

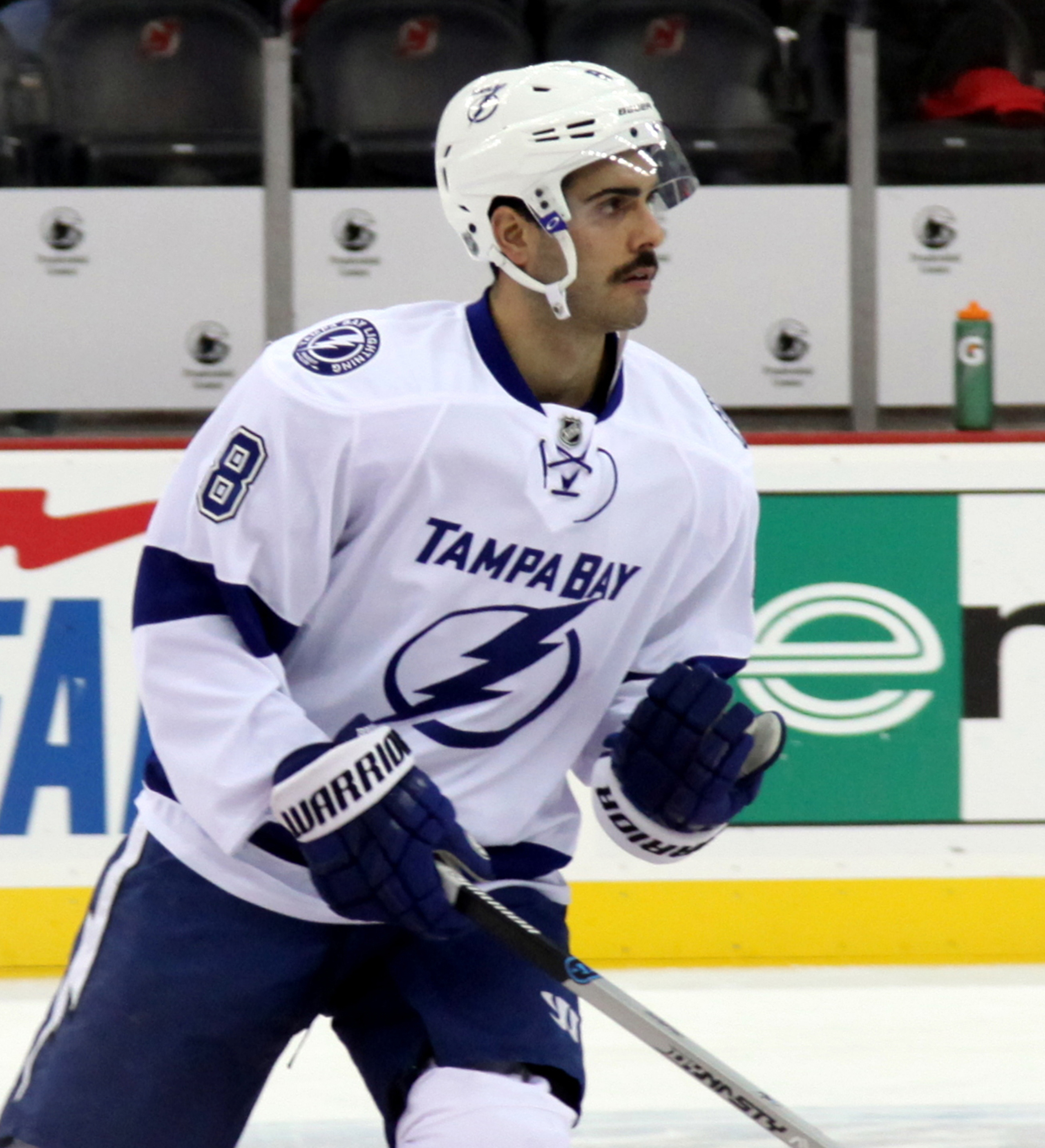
- Barberio with the Tampa Bay Lightning in December 2014
- Born: March 23, 1990 (age 36) Montreal, Quebec, Canada
- Height: 6 ft 1 in (185 cm)
- Weight: 207 lb (94 kg; 14 st 11 lb)
- Position: Defence
- Shoots: Left
- team Former teams: Free agent Tampa Bay Lightning; Montreal Canadiens; Colorado Avalanche; Lausanne HC; Ak Bars Kazan; Dinamo Minsk; Severstal Cherepovets; HC Bolzano
- National team: Canada
- NHL draft: 152nd overall, 2008; Tampa Bay Lightning
- Playing career: 2010–present

Mark Barberio (born March 23, 1990) is a Canadian professional ice hockey defenceman who is currently an unrestricted free agent. He most recently played for HC Bolzano of the ICE Hockey League (ICEHL). Barberio was selected by the Tampa Bay Lightning in the sixth round, 152nd overall, of the 2008 NHL entry draft.

== Playing career ==
=== Junior ===
Barberio played four seasons of major junior ice hockey in the Quebec Major Junior Hockey League (QMJHL) with the Cape Breton Screaming Eagles and Moncton Wildcats. He was named to the QMJHL All-Rookie Team for the 2006–07 QMJHL season and was selected to the 2009–10 QMJHL Second All-Star Team in his final season of major junior hockey.

On May 28, 2010, the Tampa Bay Lightning signed Barberio to a three-year, entry-level contract.

=== Professional ===
==== Tampa Bay Lightning ====
On April 5, 2012, in his second professional season, Barberio was named to the 2011–12 American Hockey League First All-Roster. Five days later, on April 10, Barberio was announced as the recipient of the Eddie Shore Award, awarded annually to the AHL's top defenceman; he became the first Admiral ever to win the award. Barberio leads the AHL defensemen with 47 assists and 60 points, with three games left on the season. This nearly doubled the 31-point total he had in the prior season. Barberio and the Admirals later went on a record-setting 28-game win streak, the longest streak in North American professional hockey history. In addition to the record streak, Barberio would capture the Calder Cup with Norfolk in a four-game sweep of the Toronto Marlies.

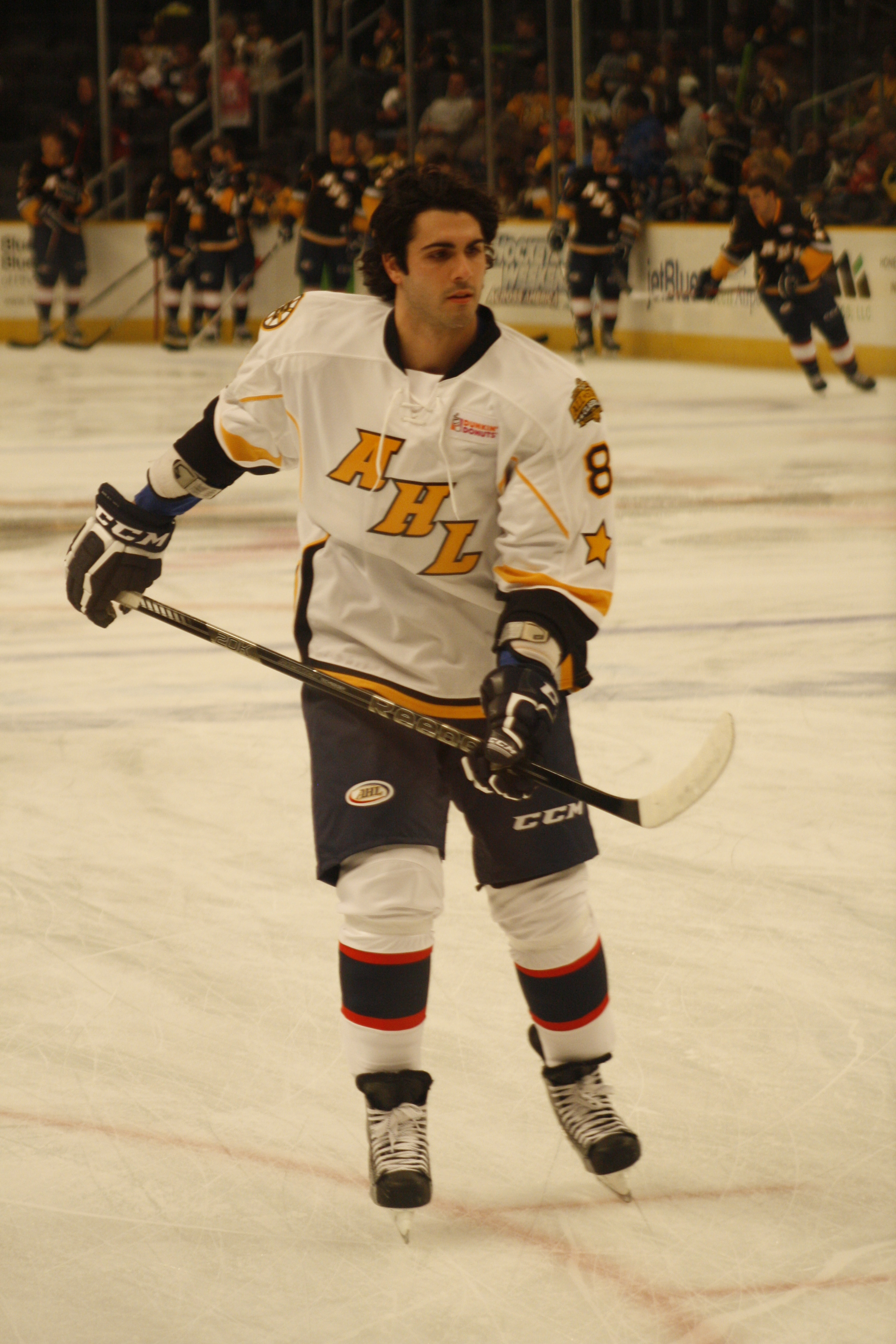
Barberio at the 2013 AHL All-Star Game.

Coming off the Calder Cup championship, the Lightning changed their minor league affiliate to the Syracuse Crunch. Barberio failed to make Tampa Bay's NHL roster out of training camp and was subsequently assigned to Syracuse for the start of the 2012–13. On April 8, 2013, Barberio was recalled by Tampa Bay, making his NHL debut the next day, on April 9, against the Ottawa Senators. Prior to his call-up, Barberio had played in 70 AHL games, scoring eight goals and 40 points with a +7 plus-minus rating; his goal, assist and point totals were leading all Crunch defencemen. Barberio played in two NHL games, logging a season-high in ice time (16:47) on April 11. After promptly being reassigned on April 14, Barberio and the Crunch eventually reached the Calder Cup Final, but were defeated by the Grand Rapids Griffins in a four games to two series loss. He finished with three goals and 15 points during the 2013 Calder Cup playoffs, leading all playoff defencemen in points.

Ahead of the 2013–14 season, Barberio made the Lightning's opening night roster out of training camp, reuniting with former Syracuse head coach and current Lightning head coach, Jon Cooper. On January 19, 2014, Barberio scored his first two NHL goals in a Tampa 5–3 victory over the Carolina Hurricanes, becoming just the second player in Lightning history to score his first two career NHL goals in the same game. After his milestone game, it became public that Barberio had earlier promised himself as a minor leaguer in the AHL two years prior that he would not cut his hair until he made it to the NHL and scored his first goal. He ultimately finished the regular season with five goals and five assists (ten points) in 49 games played for the Lightning and was also tied for fourth in the NHL amongst rookie defencemen with a +10 plus-minus rating. Barberio also made his Stanley Cup playoff debut against Montreal Canadiens in the Eastern Conference Quarterfinals, playing in two games in the Canadiens' eventual four-game series sweep.

On June 27, 2014, Tampa Bay re-signed Barberio to a one-year, one-way contract for the 2014–15 season. On April 2, 2015, Barberio played in his 100th career NHL game in a 2–1 Lightning overtime loss to the Ottawa Senators. He finished the regular season with one goal and six assists for seven points from 52 games played. Barberio played one game in the 2015 Stanley Cup playoffs while the Lightning went to the Stanley Cup Finals.

==== Montreal Canadiens ====
On July 1, 2015, Barberio signed a one-year, two-way contract with the Montreal Canadiens for the 2015–16 season. Barberio was assigned following his first training camp with the Canadiens to AHL affiliate, the St. John's IceCaps. Leaned upon as the IceCaps' top defensemen, he responded in kind with 20 points in 26 games before he was recalled following a spate of injuries to Montreal on December 27, 2015. Barberio secured a role on the club's third pair, and continued in the NHL for the remainder of the season in contributing with 2 goals and 10 points in 30 games.

In the off-season, Barberio was re-signed to a two-year, one-way contract extension with the Canadiens on June 14, 2016. With Montreal adding blueline depth over the summer, Barberio failed to make the club's opening night roster and began the 2016–17 season with the IceCaps. He continued his scoring prowess in the AHL, adding 18 points in 20 games earning selection to the AHL All-Star game, but he was unable to participate for a second consecutive season as he was recalled to the Canadiens. In 26 games with Montreal, Barberio was unable to replicate his previous season contributions, adding just 4 assists before he was placed on waivers in order to return to the AHL.

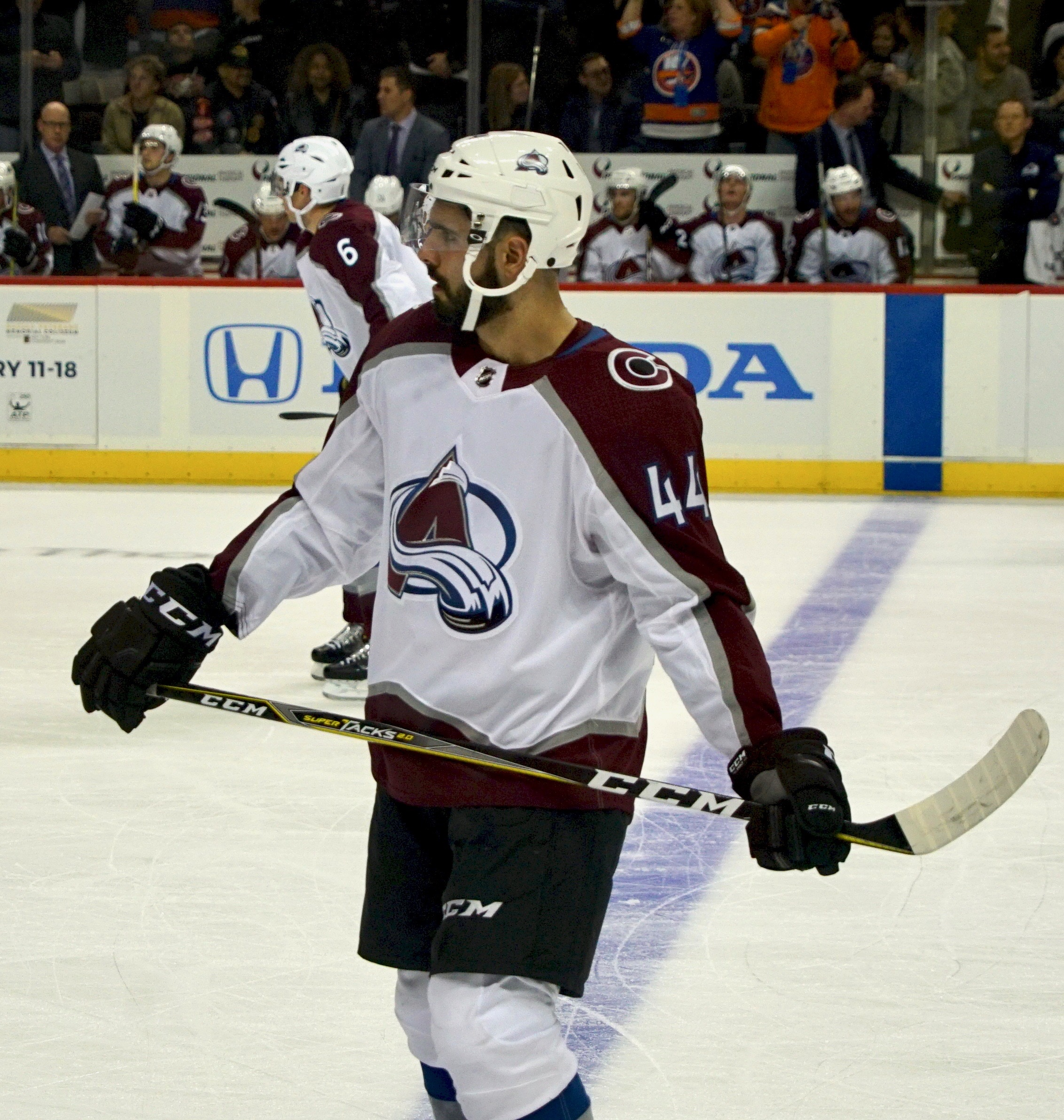
Barberio with the Avalanche in November 2017.

==== Colorado Avalanche ====
On February 2, 2017, Barberio's tenure with the Canadiens ended as he was claimed off waivers by the Colorado Avalanche. He made his debut with the Avalanche, immediately helping snap a 9-game losing streak, in a 5-2 victory over the Winnipeg Jets on February 4, 2017. Barberio added his first goal of the season, and first with the Avalanche, in his sixth game with the club in a 3-2 defeat to the New Jersey Devils on February 14, 2017. Barberio quickly adjusted with the Avalanche, featuring in every game to end the year with the Avalanche while steadily earning increased ice-time playing alongside Erik Johnson. Although unable to help lift Colorado out of the basement in the standings, Barberio finished with 2 goals and 9 points in 34 games for the Avalanche.

In his first full season with the Avalanche in 2017–18, Barberio began the year as one of the club's staples on defense. In a slow start, Barberio contributed with just 4 points through 23 games before he was healthy scratched against the Buffalo Sabres on December 5, 2017. He responded and lifted his performances before suffering an injury through a morning skate in preparation for a game against the St. Louis Blues on January 25, 2018. He remained on the sidelines for ten weeks, missing 33 games, returning to health and featuring in the 81st game of the season against the San Jose Sharks on April 5, 2018. In helping the Avalanche return to the post-season, Barberio played a team-high 170 shifts and finished with the third most ice-time through 6 games in a first-round defeat to Nashville Predators.

On May 15, 2018, the Avalanche re-signed Barberio to a two-year, $2.9 million contract extension. With the Avalanche's free agent addition of Ian Cole to their blueline, Barberio began the 2018–19 season as a healthy scratch. As the team's seventh defenseman, Barberio featured in just eight games over the opening two months of the campaign before suffering an upper-body injury to be placed on the injured reserve on November 30, 2018. In missing a month, Barberio returned to action to feature in just four more games with the Avalanche before suffering a head injury. With his season blighted through injury and healthy scratches, on his return to health, he was sent on a conditioning loan to AHL affiliate, the Colorado Eagles, on March 27, 2019. After a pair of games with the Eagles, Barberio returned to the Avalanche roster and remained a healthy scratch for the remainder of the regular season and playoffs. He finished his third season with the Avalanche registering just 1 goal in 12 games.

==== Europe ====
Following the conclusion of his contract with the Avalanche, Barberio, an impending free agent, opted to conclude his NHL career and pursue a European career. On September 10, 2020, he agreed to a three-year deal with Swiss club, Lausanne HC of the NL.

In the midst of his second season with Lausanne in 2021–22, Barberio, as team captain, registered 6 assists through 14 games before he was loaned for the remainder of the season to the KHL in joining Russian based, Ak Bars Kazan, on December 8, 2021.

In August 2022, after securing a release from his contract with Lausanne, HC Dinamo-Minsk announced the signing of Barberio to a one-year deal for the 2022–23 season.

Following a single season with Minsk, Barberio opted to continue his tenure in the KHL, agreeing to a one-year contract with Russian club Severstal Cherepovets on May 24, 2023.

== International play ==
In January 2022, Barberio was selected to play for Team Canada at the 2022 Winter Olympics.

== Career statistics ==
=== Regular season and playoffs ===
| | | | Regular season | | | | | Playoffs |
| Season | Team | League | GP | G | A | Pts | PIM | GP | G | A | Pts | PIM |
|---|---|---|---|---|---|---|---|---|---|---|---|---|
| 2005–06 | Lac St–Louis Lions | QMAAA | 43 | 2 | 12 | 14 | 80 | 10 | 1 | 7 | 8 | 26 |
| 2006–07 | Cape Breton Screaming Eagles | QMJHL | 41 | 2 | 8 | 10 | 42 | — | — | — | — | — |
| 2006–07 | Moncton Wildcats | QMJHL | 19 | 1 | 6 | 7 | 21 | 7 | 0 | 2 | 2 | 8 |
| 2007–08 | Moncton Wildcats | QMJHL | 70 | 11 | 35 | 46 | 75 | — | — | — | — | — |
| 2008–09 | Moncton Wildcats | QMJHL | 66 | 15 | 30 | 45 | 42 | 10 | 0 | 4 | 4 | 8 |
| 2009–10 | Moncton Wildcats | QMJHL | 65 | 17 | 43 | 60 | 72 | 21 | 5 | 17 | 22 | 12 |
| 2010–11 | Norfolk Admirals | AHL | 68 | 9 | 22 | 31 | 28 | 6 | 1 | 0 | 1 | 4 |
| 2011–12 | Norfolk Admirals | AHL | 74 | 13 | 48 | 61 | 39 | 18 | 2 | 7 | 9 | 12 |
| 2012–13 | Syracuse Crunch | AHL | 73 | 8 | 34 | 42 | 44 | 18 | 3 | 12 | 15 | 18 |
| 2012–13 | Tampa Bay Lightning | NHL | 2 | 0 | 0 | 0 | 0 | — | — | — | — | — |
| 2013–14 | Tampa Bay Lightning | NHL | 49 | 5 | 5 | 10 | 28 | 2 | 0 | 0 | 0 | 6 |
| 2014–15 | Tampa Bay Lightning | NHL | 52 | 1 | 6 | 7 | 16 | 1 | 0 | 0 | 0 | 0 |
| 2015–16 | St. John's IceCaps | AHL | 26 | 2 | 18 | 20 | 25 | — | — | — | — | — |
| 2015–16 | Montreal Canadiens | NHL | 30 | 2 | 8 | 10 | 6 | — | — | — | — | — |
| 2016–17 | St. John's IceCaps | AHL | 20 | 3 | 15 | 18 | 28 | — | — | — | — | — |
| 2016–17 | Montreal Canadiens | NHL | 26 | 0 | 4 | 4 | 10 | — | — | — | — | — |
| 2016–17 | Colorado Avalanche | NHL | 34 | 2 | 7 | 9 | 4 | — | — | — | — | — |
| 2017–18 | Colorado Avalanche | NHL | 46 | 3 | 10 | 13 | 31 | 6 | 0 | 1 | 1 | 6 |
| 2018–19 | Colorado Avalanche | NHL | 12 | 1 | 0 | 1 | 4 | — | — | — | — | — |
| 2018–19 | Colorado Eagles | AHL | 2 | 0 | 1 | 1 | 4 | — | — | — | — | — |
| 2019–20 | Colorado Avalanche | NHL | 21 | 0 | 2 | 2 | 16 | — | — | — | — | — |
| 2019–20 | Colorado Eagles | AHL | 4 | 0 | 0 | 0 | 6 | — | — | — | — | — |
| 2020–21 | Lausanne HC | NL | 43 | 1 | 19 | 20 | 95 | 4 | 0 | 0 | 0 | 29 |
| 2021–22 | Lausanne HC | NL | 14 | 0 | 6 | 6 | 8 | — | — | — | — | — |
| 2021–22 | Ak Bars Kazan | KHL | 6 | 1 | 2 | 3 | 2 | — | — | — | — | — |
| 2022–23 | Dinamo Minsk | KHL | 67 | 3 | 9 | 12 | 42 | 6 | 0 | 6 | 6 | 6 |
| 2023–24 | Severstal Cherepovets | KHL | 65 | 0 | 10 | 10 | 43 | 4 | 0 | 0 | 0 | 9 |
| 2024–25 | Severstal Cherepovets | KHL | 68 | 2 | 13 | 15 | 54 | 1 | 0 | 0 | 0 | 2 |
| 2025–26 | HC Bolzano | ICEHL | 16 | 2 | 7 | 9 | 6 | 5 | 0 | 0 | 0 | 6 |
| NHL totals | | | 272 | 14 | 42 | 56 | 115 | 9 | 0 | 1 | 1 | 12 |
| KHL totals | | | 206 | 6 | 34 | 40 | 141 | 11 | 0 | 6 | 6 | 17 |

=== International ===
| Year | Team | Event | Result | GP | G | A | Pts | PIM |
|---|---|---|---|---|---|---|---|---|
| 2022 | Canada | OG | 6th | 5 | 0 | 0 | 0 | 2 |
| Senior totals | | | | 5 | 0 | 0 | 0 | 2 |

== Awards and honours ==
| Award | Year |
|---|---|
QMJHL
| All-Rookie Team | 2006–07 |
| Second All-Star Team | 2009–10 |
AHL
| First All-Star Team | 2011–12 |
| All-Star Game | 2012, 2013, 2016*, 2017* |
| Eddie Shore Award | 2011–12 |
| Calder Cup (Norfolk Admirals) | 2011–12 |
| Second All-Star Team | 2012–13 |
