= Victor Bartley =

Canadian ice hockey player (born 1988)

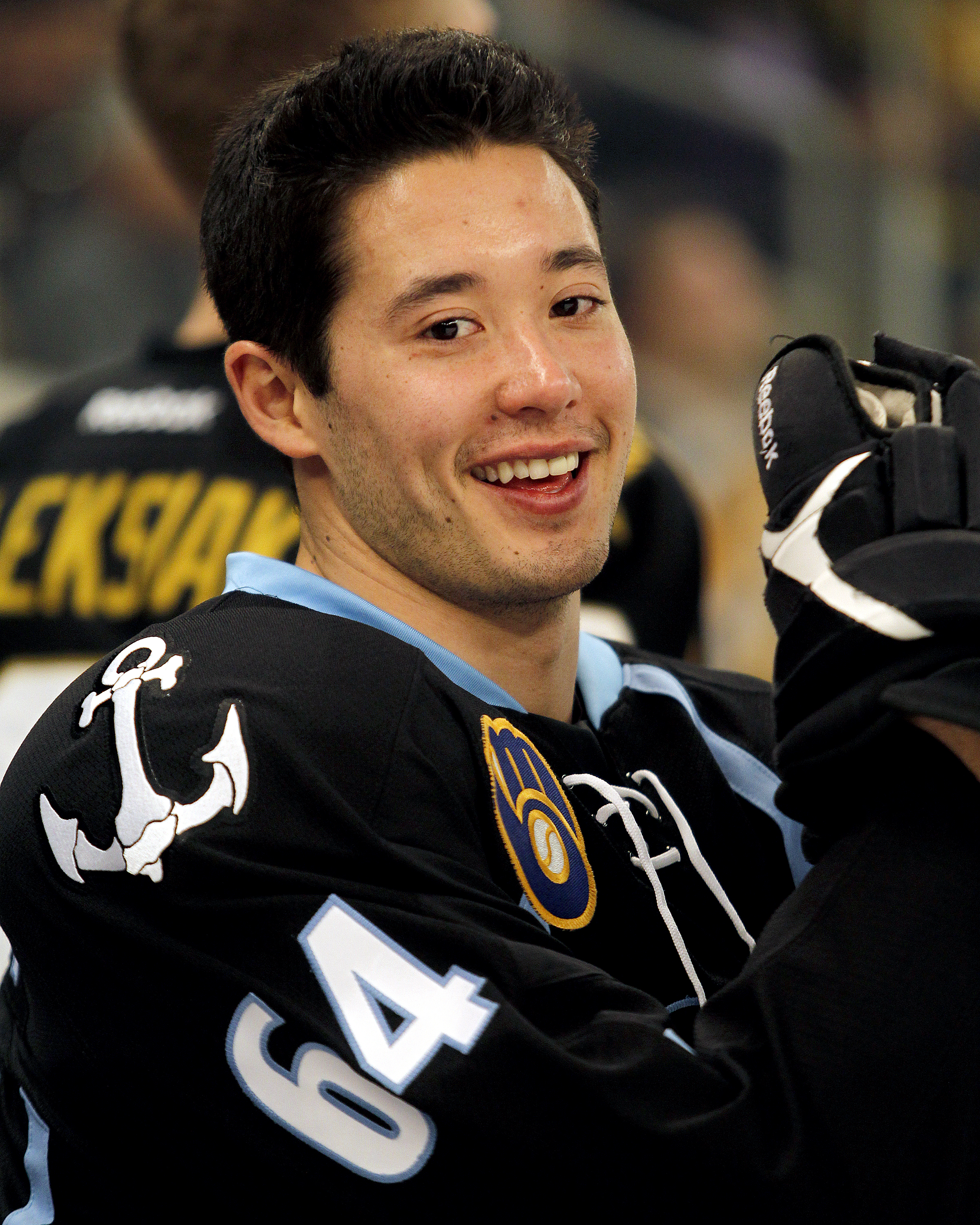
- Born: February 17, 1988 (age 38) Ottawa, Ontario, Canada
- Height: 6 ft 0 in (183 cm)
- Weight: 217 lb (98 kg; 15 st 7 lb)
- Position: Defence
- Shoots: Left
- team Former teams: Free agent Nashville Predators; Montreal Canadiens; Örebro HK; Kunlun Red Star; TH Unia Oświęcim
- NHL draft: Undrafted
- Playing career: 2009–present

Victor Bartley (born February 17, 1988) is a Canadian professional ice hockey defenceman who is currently an unrestricted free agent. He most recently played with the Utah Grizzlies in the ECHL. Bartley has previously played for the Nashville Predators, Montreal Canadiens in the National Hockey League (NHL) and Swedish team Örebro HK, before moving to the Kontinental Hockey League (KHL) to appear with Kunlun Red Star.

== Playing career ==
Bartley played major junior hockey in the Western Hockey League. As an undrafted free agent, Bartley started his first full professional season in the ECHL with the Utah Grizzlies before signing a one-year European contract with Rögle BK of the Swedish second tier HockeyAllsvenskan. Bartley led all Rogle defenceman with 34 points in 52 games during the 2010–11 season and initially signed a contract with top league club, Djurgårdens IF before he was mutually released to earn his first NHL contract, signing a two-year deal with the Nashville Predators on May 24, 2011.

After attending the Predators 2011 training camp, Bartley was reassigned to AHL affiliate, the Milwaukee Admirals for the 2011–12 season. Bartley established his credentials with the Admirals to post 39 points in 76 games from the Blueline, finishing 10th in the American League.

During the lock-out shortened 2012–13 season, Bartley received his first NHL recall and made his NHL debut for the Predators in a 6–0 victory over the Edmonton Oilers on March 8, 2013.

Bartley was traded to the Arizona Coyotes on January 15, 2016, in exchange for fellow defenceman Stefan Elliott. Bartley was then immediately packaged with John Scott and sent to the Montreal Canadiens for Jarred Tinordi.

Having completed his contract with the Canadiens, Bartley left as a free agent to sign a one-year, two-way deal with the Minnesota Wild on July 1, 2016. Bartley missed the entirety of the following 2016–17 season with the Wild, after suffering an injury in the pre-season.

Unable to earn an extension to his deal with the Wild, Bartley left as a free agent without featuring for the club. With limited NHL interest, on September 15, 2017, Bartley returned to Sweden in securing a two-year contract with top flight club, Örebro HK of the Swedish Hockey League (SHL).

After a lone season with TH Unia Oświęcim of the Polska Hokej Liga (PHL), Bartley returned to former club, Kunlun Red Star of the KHL on July 23, 2021.

As a free agent and opting to return to North America, Bartley continued his professional career in the ECHL by agreeing to a second tenure with the Utah Grizzlies for the 2022–23 season.

== Personal life ==
Bartley was born in Ottawa, Ontario and moved to Maple Ridge, British Columbia when he was five years old.

== Career statistics ==
=== Regular season and playoffs ===
			Regular season					Playoffs
Season	Team	League	GP	G	A	Pts	PIM	GP	G	A	Pts	PIM
2003–04	Kamloops Blazers	WHL	3	0	0	0	0	—	—	—	—	—
2004–05	Kamloops Blazers	WHL	68	4	6	10	58	5	0	3	3	4
2005–06	Kamloops Blazers	WHL	65	3	24	27	114	—	—	—	—	—
2006–07	Kamloops Blazers	WHL	67	4	39	43	104	4	0	2	2	8
2007–08	Kamloops Blazers	WHL	36	3	15	18	51	—	—	—	—	—
2007–08	Regina Pats	WHL	25	7	17	24	42	6	1	3	4	8
2008–09	Regina Pats	WHL	72	15	31	46	97	—	—	—	—	—
2008–09	Providence Bruins	AHL	10	0	0	0	6	—	—	—	—	—
2009–10	Utah Grizzlies	ECHL	21	2	11	13	21	—	—	—	—	—
2009–10	Bridgeport Sound Tigers	AHL	8	2	0	2	6	—	—	—	—	—
2010–11	Rögle BK	Allsv	52	11	23	34	56	10	2	7	9	8
2011–12	Milwaukee Admirals	AHL	76	9	30	39	64	1	1	0	1	0
2012–13	Milwaukee Admirals	AHL	54	7	19	26	35	2	0	1	1	0
2012–13	Nashville Predators	NHL	24	0	7	7	6	—	—	—	—	—
2013–14	Nashville Predators	NHL	50	1	5	6	23	—	—	—	—	—
2014–15	Nashville Predators	NHL	37	0	10	10	26	4	0	0	0	2
2015–16	Nashville Predators	NHL	1	0	0	0	0	—	—	—	—	—
2015–16	Milwaukee Admirals	AHL	14	0	1	1	10	—	—	—	—	—
2015–16	St. John's IceCaps	AHL	10	1	2	3	6	—	—	—	—	—
2015–16	Montreal Canadiens	NHL	9	0	0	0	6	—	—	—	—	—
2017–18	Örebro HK	SHL	44	2	13	15	32	—	—	—	—	—
2018–19	Kunlun Red Star	KHL	51	6	6	12	68	—	—	—	—	—
2019–20	Kunlun Red Star	KHL	53	3	8	11	56	—	—	—	—	—
2020–21	TH Unia Oświęcim	PHL	9	0	6	6	47	—	—	—	—	—
2021–22	Kunlun Red Star	KHL	25	0	3	3	20	—	—	—	—	—
2022–23	Utah Grizzlies	ECHL	41	1	11	12	53	—	—	—	—	—
NHL totals			121	1	22	23	61	4	0	0	0	2

=== International ===
Year	Team	Event	Result	GP	G	A	Pts	PIM
2005	Canada Pacific	U17	2nd place, silver medalist(s)	6	0	5	5	4
2006	Canada	U18	4th	7	1	1	2	10
Junior totals				13	1	6	7	14
