= Joel Hanley =

Canadian ice hockey player (born 1991)

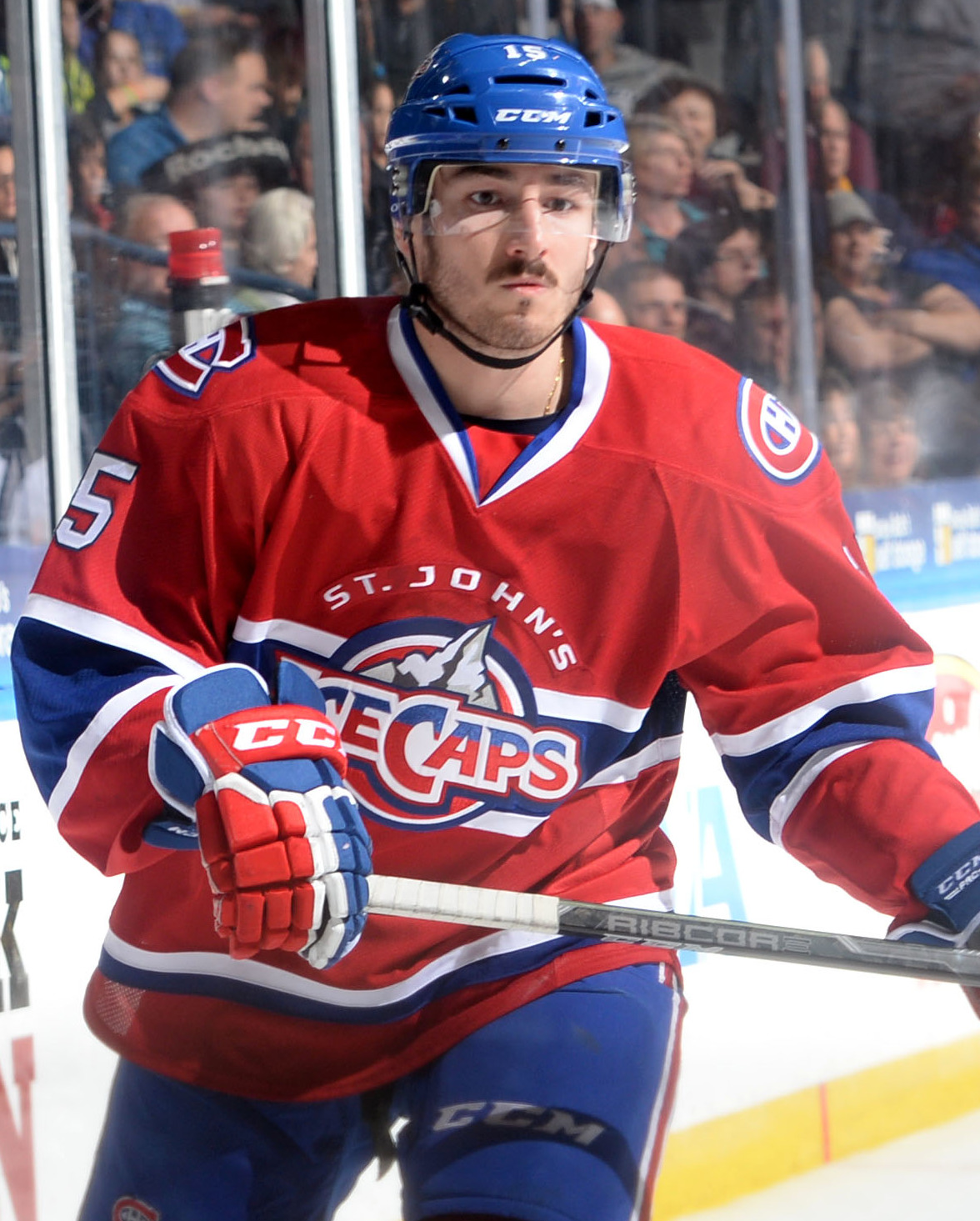
- Hanley with the St. John's IceCaps in 2015
- Born: June 8, 1991 (age 35) Keswick, Ontario, Canada
- Height: 5 ft 11 in (180 cm)
- Weight: 190 lb (86 kg; 13 st 8 lb)
- Position: Defence
- Shoots: Left
- NHL team Former teams: Calgary Flames; Montreal Canadiens; Arizona Coyotes; Dallas Stars
- NHL draft: Undrafted
- Playing career: 2013–present

Joel Hanley (born June 8, 1991) is a Canadian professional ice hockey player who is a defenceman for the Calgary Flames of the National Hockey League (NHL). Undrafted, Hanley has previously played for the Montreal Canadiens, Arizona Coyotes and Dallas Stars.

== Playing career ==
Hanley was born in Keswick, Ontario. As a youth, he played in the 2004 Quebec International Pee-Wee Hockey Tournament with the York-Simcoe Express minor ice hockey team.

Hanley played Junior A with the Newmarket Hurricanes before spending four seasons with the UMass Minutemen ice hockey of the NCAA. Following his college career, he signed his first professional contract with the American Hockey League's Portland Pirates; He spent two seasons between 2013 and 2015 in Portland including a short demotion to the ECHL's Gwinnett Gladiators.

On July 1, 2015, Hanley signed a one-year, two-way contract with the Montreal Canadiens. He began the 2015–16 season with the Canadiens' affiliate, the St. John's IceCaps. On March 20, 2016, the Canadiens recalled him. He made his NHL debut that evening in a 4–1 loss to the Calgary Flames. Two nights later, he recorded his first two career NHL points with two assists in a 4–3 win over the Anaheim Ducks. He finished the season with six assists in ten games for the Canadiens, and 13 points in 64 games for the IceCaps.

On June 22, 2016, the Canadiens signed Hanley to a one-year, two-way contract extension. He spent the majority of the 2016–17 season with the IceCaps.

On July 1, 2017, Hanley signed a one-year, two-way contract with the Arizona Coyotes. He appeared in five games for the Coyotes during the 2017–18 season, as well as 52 for the American Hockey League's (AHL) Tucson Roadrunners.

On July 1, 2018, Hanley signed a one-year, two-way contract with the Dallas Stars. On February 20, 2019, the Stars signed Hanley to a two-year contract extension. He split the 2018–19 season between Dallas (16 games) and their AHL affiliate the Texas Stars (60 games). On May 1, 2019, he made his NHL playoff debut in Game 4 of the Stars' second round matchup against the St. Louis Blues. It was his lone postseason appearance, as he suffered an upper-body injury.

On September 10, 2020, Hanley recorded his first career playoff point, assisting on Jamie Benn's goal during Game 3 of the Western Conference Finals against the Vegas Golden Knights. On September 19, he scored his first career NHL goal in a 4–1 win over the Tampa Bay Lightning during Game 1 of the 2020 Stanley Cup Finals. On April 14, 2021, he signed a two-year contract extension with Dallas.

In the midst of his sixth year with the Stars in the 2023–24 season, after registering 3 assists through 32 regular season games, Hanley was placed on waivers and subsequently claimed by the Calgary Flames on March 5, 2024.

On July 1, 2025, Hanley signed a two-year, $1.75M AAV contract extension with the Calgary Flames.

== Career statistics ==
			Regular season					Playoffs
Season	Team	League	GP	G	A	Pts	PIM	GP	G	A	Pts	PIM
2007–08	Georgina Ice	COJHL	38	8	22	30	45	9	3	5	8	6
2007–08	Newmarket Hurricanes	OPJHL	2	0	0	0	0	—	—	—	—	—
2008–09	Newmarket Hurricanes	OJHL	50	14	24	38	61	9	3	1	4	22
2009–10	Newmarket Hurricanes	OJHL	23	5	15	20	11	19	4	9	13	12
2010–11	UMass Minutemen	HE	28	3	15	18	24	—	—	—	—	—
2011–12	UMass Minutemen	HE	36	7	18	25	18	—	—	—	—	—
2012–13	UMass Minutemen	HE	33	5	11	16	46	—	—	—	—	—
2013–14	UMass Minutemen	HE	34	2	14	16	39	—	—	—	—	—
2013–14	Portland Pirates	AHL	15	0	5	5	16	—	—	—	—	—
2014–15	Gwinnett Gladiators	ECHL	3	1	0	1	0	—	—	—	—	—
2014–15	Portland Pirates	AHL	63	2	15	17	34	5	0	1	1	0
2015–16	St. John's IceCaps	AHL	64	5	8	13	25	—	—	—	—	—
2015–16	Montreal Canadiens	NHL	10	0	6	6	0	—	—	—	—	—
2016–17	St. John's IceCaps	AHL	65	2	20	22	34	4	0	0	0	2
2016–17	Montreal Canadiens	NHL	7	0	0	0	4	—	—	—	—	—
2017–18	Tucson Roadrunners	AHL	52	2	18	20	31	9	0	4	4	0
2017–18	Arizona Coyotes	NHL	5	0	0	0	0	—	—	—	—	—
2018–19	Texas Stars	AHL	60	8	20	28	32	—	—	—	—	—
2018–19	Dallas Stars	NHL	16	0	0	0	2	1	0	0	0	0
2019–20	Texas Stars	AHL	40	0	10	10	8	—	—	—	—	—
2019–20	Dallas Stars	NHL	8	0	2	2	6	12	1	1	2	4
2020–21	Dallas Stars	NHL	35	0	8	8	2	—	—	—	—	—
2021–22	Dallas Stars	NHL	44	2	4	6	4	7	0	0	0	0
2022–23	Dallas Stars	NHL	26	0	2	2	15	13	0	1	1	4
2023–24	Dallas Stars	NHL	32	0	3	3	23	—	—	—	—	—
2023–24	Calgary Flames	NHL	10	1	1	2	7	—	—	—	—	—
2024–25	Calgary Flames	NHL	53	2	7	9	21	—	—	—	—	—
2025–26	Calgary Flames	NHL	68	0	7	7	44	—	—	—	—	—
NHL totals			314	5	40	45	128	33	1	2	3	8
