= Ryan Johnston =

Canadian ice hockey player

- Born: February 14, 1992 (age 34) Sudbury, Ontario, Canada
- Height: 5 ft 10 in (178 cm)
- Weight: 180 lb (82 kg; 12 st 12 lb)
- Position: Defence
- Shoots: Right
- team Former teams: Free Agent; Montreal Canadiens; Luleå HF; HC Lugano; Mora IK; Iserlohn Roosters; HPK
- NHL draft: Undrafted
- Playing career: 2015–present

Ryan Johnston (born February 14, 1992) is a Canadian professional ice hockey defenceman currently an unrestricted free agent. He has previously played in the National Hockey League (NHL) with the Montreal Canadiens.

== Playing career ==
Born in Sudbury, Ontario, Johnston played three years of college hockey with the Colgate Raiders. In the summer of 2015, he signed a two-year two-way deal with the Canadiens and played the 2015–16 with Montreal's AHL affiliate, the St. John's IceCaps. After a string of injuries to Canadiens' defenceman, Johnston was called up and played his first NHL game on April 5, 2016.

After his entry-level contract with the Canadiens having played in 10 games for two seasons, Johnston left the Canadiens as an impending restricted free agent, agreeing to a two-year contract with Top Tier SHL club, Luleå HF, on June 26, 2017. In the 2017–18 season, Johnston registered 2 goals and 11 points in 36 games on the blueline for Luleå. He was loaned after the season to playoff-bound Swiss club, HC Lugano of the National League on February 28, 2018. Johnston enjoyed a successful post-season with Lugano, posting 10 points in just 17 games.

On September 15, 2018, Johnston transferred his SHL contract to play with Mora IK for the 2018–19 season. Johnston responded with his new club in recording a career season, by posting 3 goals and 22 points in 50 regular season games. Despite posting 6 points in 5 SHL Kvalserien games, Johnston could not prevent Mora from returning to the Allsvenskan.

As a free agent from Mora, Johnston returned to North America by securing a one-year AHL contract with the Toronto Marlies on July 18, 2019. After attending the Marlies training camp, Johnston began the 2019–20 season as a healthy scratch. Before making his debut with the Marlies, Johnston was traded to the San Diego Gulls, an affiliate of the Anaheim Ducks, for future considerations on October 31, 2019.

Johnston after his contract with the Gulls, opted to return to Europe as a free agent. He belatedly agreed to join the German outfit, the Iserlohn Roosters of the DEL, on December 18, 2020.

== Personal life ==
Johnston's sister Rebecca is a member of the Canada women's national ice hockey team and a two-time Olympic gold winner. Their uncle Mike Johnston was the head coach of the Pittsburgh Penguins in the 2014–15 and part of the 2015–16 seasons and an assistant coach with the Vancouver Canucks and the Los Angeles Kings.

== Career statistics ==
			Regular season					Playoffs
Season	Team	League	GP	G	A	Pts	PIM	GP	G	A	Pts	PIM
2009–10	Elmira Sugar Kings	GOJHL	37	3	20	23	20	12	0	3	3	4
2010–11	Nepean Raiders	CCHL	58	11	31	42	32	7	1	3	4	6
2011–12	Nepean Raiders	CCHL	56	17	54	71	32	18	9	9	18	8
2012–13	Colgate University	ECAC	35	0	8	8	30	—	—	—	—	—
2013–14	Colgate University	ECAC	37	4	15	19	37	—	—	—	—	—
2014–15	Colgate University	ECAC	38	1	14	15	26	—	—	—	—	—
2015–16	St. John's IceCaps	AHL	37	0	12	12	14	—	—	—	—	—
2015–16	Montreal Canadiens	NHL	3	0	0	0	0	—	—	—	—	—
2016–17	St. John's IceCaps	AHL	50	5	13	18	22	—	—	—	—	—
2016–17	Montreal Canadiens	NHL	7	0	0	0	4	—	—	—	—	—
2017–18	Luleå HF	SHL	36	2	9	11	26	—	—	—	—	—
2017–18	HC Lugano	NL	1	0	2	2	0	17	2	8	10	20
2018–19	Mora IK	SHL	50	3	19	22	36	—	—	—	—	—
2019–20	San Diego Gulls	AHL	15	1	5	6	0	—	—	—	—	—
2019–20	Idaho Steelheads	ECHL	4	0	1	1	5	—	—	—	—	—
2020–21	Iserlohn Roosters	DEL	17	3	10	13	10	—	—	—	—	—
2021–22	HPK	Liiga	41	4	16	20	81	2	0	1	1	0
NHL totals			10	0	0	0	4	—	—	—	—	—
