= Lucas Lessio =

Canadian ice hockey player (born 1993)

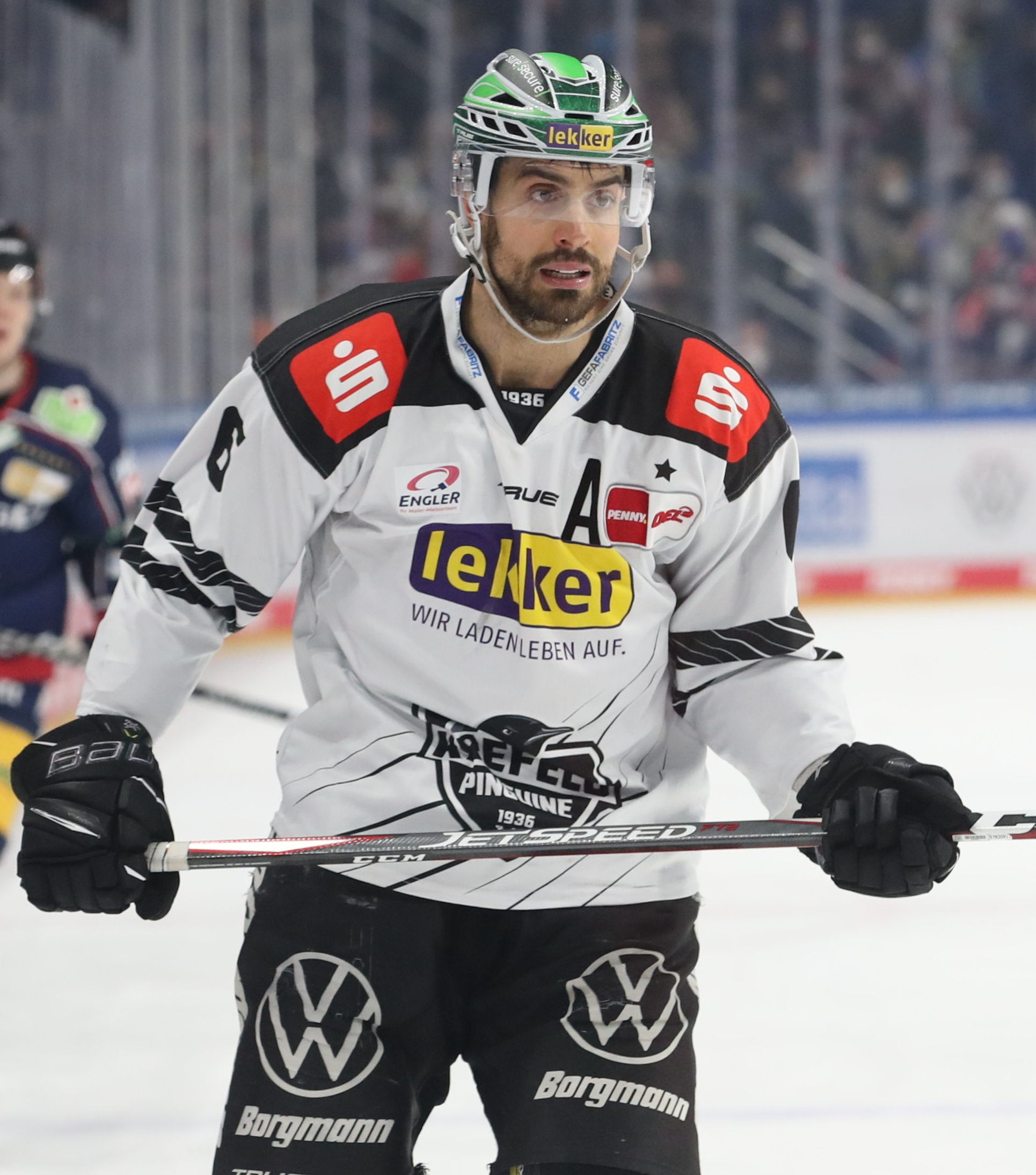
- Lessio with Krefeld Pinguine in 2022
- Born: January 23, 1993 (age 33) Maple, Ontario, Canada
- Height: 6 ft 1 in (185 cm)
- Weight: 212 lb (96 kg; 15 st 2 lb)
- Position: Left Wing
- Shoots: Left
- team Former teams: Free agent Arizona Coyotes; Montreal Canadiens; Medvescak Zagreb; Örebro HK; Dinamo Riga; Kunlun Red Star; HIFK; Mountfield HK; Grizzlys Wolfsburg; Krefeld Pinguine; EC KAC; HC Bolzano
- NHL draft: 56th overall, 2011; Phoenix Coyotes
- Playing career: 2013–present

Lucas Lessio (born January 23, 1993) is a Canadian professional ice hockey player who is currently an unrestricted free agent. He most recently played for Düsseldorfer EG of the DEL2. He was selected in the second round, 56th overall, by the Phoenix Coyotes of the National Hockey League (NHL) in the 2011 NHL entry draft. Lessio has also previously played for the Montreal Canadiens.

== Playing career ==
Lessio played his final season of major junior hockey with the Oshawa Generals of the Ontario Hockey League (OHL) in 2012–13, amassing 19 goals and 34 points in 35 games. He also appeared in five American Hockey League (AHL) games with the Portland Pirates near the end of the 2012–13 AHL season, recording a goal and an assist.

Following a successful preseason training camp, Lessio made the cut to start the 2013–14 season in the NHL with the Phoenix Coyotes.

In the 2015–16 season, Lessio was assigned to begin the year with new AHL affiliate, the Springfield Falcons. On December 15, 2015, Lessio was traded to the Montreal Canadiens in exchange for Christian Thomas. He remained in the AHL, assigned to the Canadiens' own affiliate, the St. John's IceCaps. On January 31, 2016, Lessio was recalled to the NHL.

In October 2016, Lessio opted to take his game overseas, accepting an offer from Medvescak Zagreb of the Kontinental Hockey League (KHL). He saw action in 38 KHL contests, tallying eleven goals and nine assists. In February 2017, he transferred to Örebro HK of the Swedish Hockey League (SHL). Lessio played out the season with Örebro, registering two goals in eight games to end his brief tenure with the club.

On June 20, 2017, Lessio returned for a second stint in the KHL, agreeing to a one-year deal with Latvian based club, Dinamo Riga. In the 2017–18 season, Lessio appeared in just 13 games with Riga before he was released and later signed with Kunlun Red Star on November 3, 2017.

On July 22, 2020, Lessio signed with the Krefeld Pinguine of the Deutsche Eishockey Liga (DEL).

== Career statistics ==
=== Regular season and playoffs ===
			Regular season					Playoffs
Season	Team	League	GP	G	A	Pts	PIM	GP	G	A	Pts	PIM
2008–09	Toronto Marlboros Midget AAA	GTHL	72	53	60	113	126	—	—	—	—	—
2009–10	St. Michael's Buzzers	CCHL	41	30	42	72	87	4	5	0	3	10
2010–11	Oshawa Generals	OHL	66	27	27	54	66	10	5	4	9	6
2011–12	Oshawa Generals	OHL	66	34	25	59	71	6	3	2	5	6
2012–13	Oshawa Generals	OHL	35	19	15	34	38	9	1	2	3	20
2012–13	Portland Pirates	AHL	5	1	1	2	4	3	0	2	2	0
2013–14	Phoenix Coyotes	NHL	3	0	0	0	2	—	—	—	—	—
2013–14	Portland Pirates	AHL	69	29	25	54	63	—	—	—	—	—
2014–15	Portland Pirates	AHL	49	15	16	31	26	5	0	3	3	0
2014–15	Arizona Coyotes	NHL	26	2	3	5	8	—	—	—	—	—
2015–16	Springfield Falcons	AHL	24	7	5	12	25	—	—	—	—	—
2015–16	St. John's IceCaps	AHL	18	3	6	9	16	—	—	—	—	—
2015–16	Montreal Canadiens	NHL	12	1	1	2	2	—	—	—	—	—
2016–17	KHL Medveščak Zagreb	KHL	40	12	10	22	93	—	—	—	—	—
2016–17	Örebro HK	SHL	8	2	0	2	14	—	—	—	—	—
2017–18	Dinamo Riga	KHL	13	2	1	3	14	—	—	—	—	—
2017–18	Kunlun Red Star	KHL	29	6	3	9	20	—	—	—	—	—
2018–19	HIFK	Liiga	16	6	5	11	16	—	—	—	—	—
2018–19	Mountfield HK	ELH	15	3	3	6	4	—	—	—	—	—
2019–20	Grizzlys Wolfsburg	DEL	19	6	5	11	10	—	—	—	—	—
2020–21	Krefeld Pinguine	DEL	37	12	9	21	30	—	—	—	—	—
2021–22	Krefeld Pinguine	DEL	56	25	16	41	32	—	—	—	—	—
2022–23	EC KAC	ICEHL	47	14	14	28	31	10	4	4	8	2
2023–24	HC Bolzano	ICEHL	14	1	2	3	12	—	—	—	—	—
2023–24	Krefeld Pinguine	DEL2	25	8	10	18	16	—	—	—	—	—
2024–25	Krefeld Pinguine	DEL2	44	25	25	50	55	12	6	9	15	21
2025–26	Düsseldorfer EG	DEL2	30	5	7	12	34	—	—	—	—	—
NHL totals			41	3	4	7	12	—	—	—	—	—

=== International ===
Year	Team	Event	Result	GP	G	A	Pts	PIM
2010	Canada Ontario	U17	2nd place, silver medalist(s)	6	2	3	5	4
Junior totals				6	2	3	5	4

== Awards and honours ==
Medal record

Representing Canada

Ice hockey

World U-17 Hockey Challenge
Silver medal – second place	2010 Ontario	

Award	Year	Ref
Minor
OHL Cup champion	2009	
Tim Adams Memorial Trophy	2009	
CHL
CHL/NHL Top Prospects Game	2011	
OHL
First All-Rookie Team	2011	
