= 2015–16 Chicago Blackhawks season =

National Hockey League team season

2015–16 Chicago Blackhawks
- Division: 3rd Central
- Conference: 3rd Western
- 2015–16 record: 47–26–9
- Home record: 26–11–4
- Road record: 21–15–5
- Goals for: 235
- Goals against: 209

Team information
- General manager: Stan Bowman
- Coach: Joel Quenneville
- Captain: Jonathan Toews
- Alternate captains: Duncan Keith; Brent Seabrook
- Arena: United Center
- Average attendance: 21,859 (110.9%); Total: 896,240
- Minor league affiliates: Rockford IceHogs (AHL); Indy Fuel (ECHL)

Team leaders
- Goals: Patrick Kane (46)
- Assists: Patrick Kane (60)
- Points: Patrick Kane (106)
- Penalty minutes: Andrew Shaw (69)
- Plus/minus: Patrick Kane (+17)
- Wins: Corey Crawford (35)
- Goals against average: Michael Leighton (1.54)

The 2015–16 Chicago Blackhawks season was the 90th season for the National Hockey League (NHL) franchise that was established on September 25, 1926. They entered the season as defending Stanley Cup champions having won the Stanley Cup the previous season, their third championship in six years. The Blackhawks finished the season with 103 points to finish in third place in the Central Division, only six points behind the Western Conference-leading Dallas Stars. They lost in the first round of the Stanley Cup playoffs to the St. Louis Blues in seven games.

Patrick Kane led the Blackhawks with 46 goals and 106 points, both career highs. He was named the winner of the Hart Memorial Trophy as most valuable player in the NHL, becoming the first US-born player to receive the award. The Blackhawks had four players who scored 20 or more goals: Kane, Artemi Panarin (30), Jonathan Toews, and (28) Artem Anisimov (22). Goalie Corey Crawford led the Blackhawks with 35 wins. Artemi Panarin received the Calder Memorial Trophy as rookie of the year.

== Off-season ==
The Blackhawks faced an off-season of change after being crowned Stanley Cup Champions for a third time in six years. Coming into the offseason, it was well known Chicago was facing impending cap space struggles and moves would need to be made.

On June 27, Chicago traded backup goaltender Antti Raanta to the New York Rangers in exchange for AHL forward Ryan Haggerty. Two days after the trade, defenseman David Rundblad received a two-year, $2 million contract extension on June 29.

The Blackhawks attempted to negotiate a contract for winger Brandon Saad who was a restricted free agent, but were unsuccessful. Unlikely to match any sizeable offer sheets due to cap constraints, Chicago traded Saad to the Columbus Blue Jackets. Chicago sent Saad and prospects Michael Paliotta and Alex Broadhurst to Columbus in exchange for center Artem Anisimov, wingers Jeremy Morin and Corey Tropp, as well as prospect Marko Dano and their 2016 4th round pick. Anisimov subsequently signed a five-year, $22.75 million contract with the Blackhawks. The move did not sit well with the Chicago fanbase, as Saad was viewed as another top young player on the Stanley Cup-winning squad, even though Anisimov would score 42 points for the Blackhawks in 2015–16.

Chicago turned to Russia a few times throughout the off-season. Kontinental Hockey League winger Viktor Tihkonov signed a one-year, $1.04 million contract with Chicago on July 1. Tihkonov was returning to the NHL for the first time since his 2009 season with the Phoenix Coyotes. Also, Chicago and Edmonton swapped minor league players, sending goaltender Anders Nilsson to the Oilers in exchange for forward Liam Coughlin.

Following season-long trade speculation, the Blackhawks pulled the trigger on another trade by trading another piece of its core Stanley Cup winning teams. Another cap clearing move, Chicago traded alternate captain Patrick Sharp and defenseman Stephen Johns to the Dallas Stars in exchange for forward Ryan Garbutt and defenseman Trevor Daley. A three-time Stanley Cup winner, Sharp carried a cap hit of $5.9 million in each of the next two seasons, limiting the Blackhawks in what they could do with free agency. A trade was expected following a down year in terms of production and the large aforementioned cap hit.

Forward Andrew Desjardins returned on a two-year contract worth $1.6 million, taking less to stay in Chicago. The team also extended the contracts of defensemen Viktor Svedberg, forward Marcus Kruger, and defenseman Michal Rozsival. They lost forwards Brad Richards and Antoine Vermette, as well as defenseman Johnny Oduya during free agency.

== Season notes ==
The Blackhawks began their title defense with an average month of October. The Blackhawks went 6–5–0. However, fortunes increased in November (7–3–1) and December (9–5–1). The Blackhawks finished December on two game winning streak, looking to keep the wins coming in 2016. The Blackhawks did just that, winning the first 10 games of January to bring the win streak to 12 games. The streak set a franchise record for consecutive wins. The streak tied the Florida Panthers win streak earlier in the season for the longest winning streak in the NHL that season.

== Standings ==
Central Division
Pos	Team	GP	W	L	OTL	ROW	GF	GA	GD	Pts
1	z – Dallas Stars	82	50	23	9	48	267	230	+37	109
2	x – St. Louis Blues	82	49	24	9	44	224	201	+23	107
3	x – Chicago Blackhawks	82	47	26	9	46	235	209	+26	103
4	x – Nashville Predators	82	41	27	14	37	228	215	+13	96
5	x – Minnesota Wild	82	38	33	11	35	216	206	+10	87
6	Colorado Avalanche	82	39	39	4	35	216	240	−24	82
7	Winnipeg Jets	82	35	39	8	32	215	239	−24	78

Source: National Hockey League
x – Clinched playoff spot; z – Clinched conference

== Schedule and results ==
=== Pre-season ===
2015 Pre-season game log: 4–2–0 (Home: 3–0–0; Road: 1–2–0)
#	Date	Opponent	Score	OT	Decision	Arena	Attendance	Record	Recap
1	Sept 22	Detroit Red Wings	5–4	OT	Visentin	United Center	20,736	1–0–0	W1
2	Sept 23	@ Detroit Red Wings	1–4		Leighton	Joe Louis Arena	16,886	1–1–0	L1
3	Sept 25	@ Montreal Canadiens	5–1		Darling	Bell Centre	21,287	2–1–0	W1
4	Sept 26	St. Louis Blues	3–1		Crawford	United Center	20,813	3–1–0	W2
5	October 1	@ St. Louis Blues	2–5		Darling	Scottrade Center	14,303	3–2–0	L1
6	October 3	Dallas Stars	4–0		Crawford	United Center	21,221	4–2–0	W1

=== Regular season ===
2015–16 Schedule

October: 6–5–0 (Home: 5–1–0; Road: 1–4–0), 12 Points
#	Date	Opponent	Score	OT	Decision	Arena	Attendance	Record	Pts	Recap
1	October 7	NY Rangers	2–3		Crawford	United Center	22,104	0–1–0	0	L1
2	October 9	@ NY Islanders	3–2	OT	Crawford	Barclays Center	15,795	1–1–0	2	W1
3	October 10	NY Islanders	4–1		Darling	United Center	21,392	2–1–0	4	W2
4	October 14	@ Philadelphia	0–3		Crawford	Wells Fargo Center	19,779	2–2–0	4	L1
5	October 15	@ Washington	1–4		Darling	Verizon Center	18,506	2–3–0	4	L2
6	October 17	Columbus	4–1		Crawford	United Center	21,563	3–3–0	6	W1
7	October 22	Florida	3–2		Crawford	United Center	21,591	4–3–0	8	W2
8	October 24	Tampa Bay	1–0	OT	Crawford	United Center	21,822	5–3–0	10	W3
9	October 26	Anaheim	1–0	OT	Crawford	United Center	21,529	6–3–0	12	W4
10	October 29	@ Winnipeg	1–3		Crawford	MTS Centre	15,294	6–4–0	12	L1
11	October 30	@ Minnesota	4–5		Darling	Xcel Energy Center	19,140	6–5–0	12	L2

November: 7–3–3 (Home: 3–1–1; Road: 4–2–2), 17 Points
#	Date	Opponent	Score	OT	Decision	Arena	Attendance	Record	Pts	Recap
12	November 2	Los Angeles	4–2		Crawford	United Center	21,534	7–5–0	14	W1
13	November 4	St. Louis	5–6	OT	Crawford	United Center	21,676	7–5–1	15	O1
14	November 6	@ New Jersey	2–4		Crawford	Prudential Center	16,514	7–6–1	15	L1
15	November 8	Edmonton	4–2		Crawford	United Center	21,611	8–6–1	17	W1
16	November 12	New Jersey	2–3		Crawford	United Center	21,568	8–7–1	17	L1
17	November 14	@ St. Louis	4–2		Crawford	Scottrade Center	19,808	9–7–1	19	W1
18	November 15	Calgary	4–1		Darling	United Center	21,629	10–7–1	21	W2
19	November 18	@ Edmonton	4–3	OT	Crawford	Rexall Place	16,839	11–7–1	23	W3
20	November 20	@ Calgary	1–2	OT	Darling	Scotiabank Saddledome	19,289	11–7–2	24	O1
21	November 21	@ Vancouver	3–6		Crawford	Rogers Arena	18,570	11–8–2	24	L1
22	November 25	@ San Jose	5–2		Crawford	SAP Center at San Jose	17,562	12–8–2	26	W1
23	November 27	@ Anaheim	3–2	OT	Crawford	Honda Center	17,174	13–8–2	28	W2
24	November 28	@ Los Angeles	2–3	OT	Darling	Staples Center	18,230	13–8–3	29	O1

December: 9–5–1 (Home: 6–3–0; Road: 3–2–1), 19 Points
#	Date	Opponent	Score	OT	Decision	Arena	Attendance	Record	Pts	Recap
25	December 1	Minnesota	1–2		Crawford	United Center	21,580	13–9–3	29	L1
26	December 3	@ Ottawa	3–4	OT	Crawford	Canadian Tire Centre	17,171	13–9–4	30	O1
27	December 6	Winnipeg	3–1		Crawford	United Center	21,749	14–9–4	32	W1
28	December 8	Nashville	4–1		Crawford	United Center	21,432	15–9–4	34	W2
29	December 10	@ Nashville	1–5		Darling	Bridgestone Arena	17,113	15–10–4	34	L1
30	December 11	Winnipeg	2–0		Crawford	United Center	22,021	16–10–4	36	W1
31	December 13	Vancouver	4–0		Crawford	United Center	21,711	17–10–4	38	W2
32	December 15	Colorado	0–3		Crawford	United Center	21,473	17–11–4	38	L1
33	December 17	Edmonton	4–0		Crawford	United Center	21,451	18–11–4	40	W1
34	December 19	@ Buffalo	3–2	SO	Crawford	First Niagara Center	18,870	19–11–4	42	W2
35	December 20	San Jose	4–3	OT	Crawford	United Center	22,096	20–11–4	44	W3
36	December 22	@ Dallas	0–4		Crawford	American Airlines Center	18,532	20–12–4	44	L1
37	December 27	Carolina	1–2		Crawford	United Center	22,157	20–13–4	44	L2
38	December 29	@ Arizona	7–5		Crawford	Gila River Arena	17,197	21–13–4	46	W1
39	December 31	@ Colorado	4–3	OT	Darling	Pepsi Center	18,048	22–13–4	48	W2

January: 11–3–0 (Home: 7–0–0; Road: 4–3–0), 22 Points
#	Date	Opponent	Score	OT	Decision	Arena	Attendance	Record	Pts	Recap
40	January 3	Ottawa	3–0		Crawford	United Center	22,016	23–13–4	50	W3
41	January 5	@ Pittsburgh	3–2	OT	Crawford	Consol Energy Center	18,658	24–13–4	52	W4
42	January 6	Pittsburgh	3–1		Darling	United Center	21,908	25–13–4	54	W5
43	January 8	Buffalo	3–1		Crawford	United Center	22,142	26–13–4	56	W6
44	January 10	Colorado	6–3		Crawford	United Center	22,007	27–13–4	58	W7
45	January 12	Nashville	3–2		Crawford	United Center	21,618	28–13–4	60	W8
46	January 14	@ Montreal	2–1		Crawford	Bell Centre	21,288	29–13–4	62	W9
47	January 15	@ Toronto	4–1		Darling	Air Canada Centre	20,049	30–13–4	64	W10
48	January 17	Montreal	5–2		Crawford	United Center	22,030	31–13–4	66	W11
49	January 19	@ Nashville	4–1		Crawford	Bridgestone Arena	17,122	32–13–4	68	W12
50	January 21	@ Tampa Bay	1–2		Crawford	Amalie Arena	19,092	32–14–4	68	L1
51	January 22	@ Florida	0–4		Darling	BB&T Center	19,343	32–15–4	68	L2
52	January 24	St. Louis	2–0		Crawford	United Center	22,138	33–15–4	70	W1
53	January 26	@ Carolina	0–5		Crawford	PNC Arena	14,588	33–16–4	70	L1

February: 6–4–1 (Home: 2–3–1; Road: 4–1–0), 13 Points
#	Date	Opponent	Score	OT	Decision	Arena	Attendance	Record	Pts	Recap
54	February 2	@ Colorado	2–1		Crawford	Pepsi Center	18,007	34–16–4	72	W1
55	February 4	@ Arizona	5–4	OT	Crawford	Gila River Arena	17,125	35–16–4	74	W2
56	February 6	@ Dallas	5–1		Crawford	American Airlines Center	18,532	36–16–4	76	W3
57	February 9	San Jose	0–2		Crawford	United Center	21,753	36–17–4	76	L1
58	February 11	Dallas	2–4		Crawford	United Center	22,051	36–18–4	76	L2
59	February 13	Anaheim	2–3	OT	Crawford	United Center	22,107	36–18–5	77	O1
60	February 15	Toronto	7–2		Darling	United Center	21,767	37–18–5	79	W1
61	February 17	@ NY Rangers	5–3		Crawford	Madison Square Garden	18,006	38–18–5	81	W2
62	February 21	@ Minnesota	1–6		Crawford	TCF Bank Stadium	50,426	38–19–5	81	L1
63	February 25	Nashville	1–3		Crawford	United Center	22,058	38–20–5	81	L2
64	February 28	Washington	3–2		Crawford	United Center	22,218	39–20–5	83	W1

March: 5–6–2 (Home: 1–3–1; Road: 4–3–1), 12 Points
#	Date	Opponent	Score	OT	Decision	Arena	Attendance	Record	Pts	Recap
65	March 2	@ Detroit	5–2		Crawford	Joe Louis Arena	20,027	40–20–5	85	W2
66	March 3	@ Boston	2–4		Darling	TD Garden	17,565	40–21–5	85	L1
67	March 6	Detroit	4–1		Crawford	United Center	22,247	41–21–5	87	W1
68	March 9	@ St. Louis	2–3	SO	Crawford	Scottrade Center	19,756	41–21–6	88	O1
69	March 11	@ Dallas	2–5		Crawford	American Airlines Center	18,532	41–22–6	88	L1
70	March 14	Los Angeles	0–5		Crawford	United Center	22,170	41–23–6	88	L2
71	March 16	Philadelphia	2–3		Darling	United Center	22,113	41–24–6	88	L3
72	March 18	@ Winnipeg	4–0		Darling	MTS Centre	15,294	42–24–6	90	W1
73	March 20	Minnesota	2–3	SO	Darling	United Center	22,059	42–24–7	91	O1
74	March 22	Dallas	2–6		Darling	United Center	22,034	42–25–7	91	L1
75	March 26	@ Calgary	4–1		Darling	Scotiabank Saddledome	19,289	43–25–7	93	W1
76	March 27	@ Vancouver	3–2		Darling	Rogers Arena	18,570	44–25–7	95	W2
77	March 29	@ Minnesota	1–4		Darling	Xcel Energy Center	19,190	44–26–7	95	L1

April: 3–0–2 (Home: 2–0–1; Road: 1–0–1), 8 Points
#	Date	Opponent	Score	OT	Decision	Arena	Attendance	Record	Pts	Recap
78	April 1	@ Winnipeg	5–4	OT	Darling	MTS Centre	15,294	45–26–7	97	W1
79	April 3	Boston	6–4		Darling	United Center	22,156	46–26–7	99	W2
80	April 5	Arizona	6–2		Darling	United Center	21,884	47–26–7	101	W3
81	April 7	St. Louis	1–2	OT	Darling	United Center	22,075	47–26–8	102	O1
82	April 9	@ Columbus	4–5	OT	Crawford	Nationwide Arena	19,177	47–26–9	103	O2

Legend: Win (2 points) Loss (0 points) Overtime/shootout loss (1 point)

Detailed records

Western Conference
Opponent	Home	Away	Total	Pts.	Goals scored	Goals allowed
Central Division
Chicago Blackhawks	–	–	–	–	–	–
Colorado Avalanche	1–1–0	2–0–0	3–1–0	6	12	10
Dallas Stars	0–2–0	1–2–0	1–4–0	2	11	20
Minnesota Wild	0–1–1	0–3–0	0–4–1	1	9	20
Nashville Predators	2–1–0	1–1–0	3–2–0	6	13	11
St. Louis Blues	1–0–1	1–0–1	2–0–2	6	9	7
Winnipeg Jets	2–0–0	2–1–0	4–1–0	8	15	9
	6–4–2	7–6–1	13–10–3	29	66	72
Pacific Division
Anaheim Ducks	1–0–1	1–0–0	2–0–1	5	6	5
Arizona Coyotes	1–0–0	2–0–0	3–0–0	6	18	11
Calgary Flames	2–0–0	0–0–1	2–0–1	5	9	4
Edmonton Oilers	2–0–0	1–0–0	3–0–0	6	12	5
Los Angeles Kings	1–1–0	0–0–1	1–1–1	3	6	10
San Jose Sharks	1–1–0	1–0–0	2–1–0	4	9	7
Vancouver Canucks	1–0–0	1–1–0	2–1–0	4	10	8
	8–2–1	7–1–2	15–3–3	33	70	50

Eastern Conference
Opponent	Home	Away	Total	Pts.	Goals scored	Goals allowed
Atlantic Division
Boston Bruins	1–0–0	0–1–0	1–1–0	2	8	8
Buffalo Sabres	1–0–0	1–0–0	2–0–0	4	6	3
Detroit Red Wings	1–0–0	1–0–0	2–0–0	4	9	3
Florida Panthers	1–0–0	0–1–0	1–1–0	2	3	6
Montreal Canadiens	1–0–0	1–0–0	2–0–0	4	7	3
Ottawa Senators	1–0–0	1–0–1	1–0–1	3	6	4
Tampa Bay Lightning	1–0–0	0–1–0	1–1–0	2	2	2
Toronto Maple Leafs	1–0–0	1–0–0	2–0–0	4	11	3
	8–0–0	4–3–1	12–3–1	25	52	32
Metropolitan Division
Carolina Hurricanes	0–1–0	0–1–0	0–2–0	0	1	7
Columbus Blue Jackets	1–0–0	0–0–1	1–0–1	3	8	6
New Jersey Devils	0–1–0	0–1–0	0–2–0	0	4	7
New York Islanders	1–0–0	1–0–0	2–0–0	4	7	3
New York Rangers	0–1–0	1–0–0	1–1–0	2	7	6
Philadelphia Flyers	0–1–0	0–1–0	0–2–0	0	2	6
Pittsburgh Penguins	1–0–0	1–0–0	2–0–0	4	6	3
Washington Capitals	1–0–0	0–1–0	1–1–0	2	4	6
	4–4–0	3–4–1	7–8–1	15	37	40

=== Playoffs ===
2016 Stanley Cup playoffs

Western Conference First Round vs. (C2) St. Louis Blues: St. Louis wins 4–3
#	Date	Visitor	Score	Home	OT	Decision	Attendance	Series	Recap
1	April 13	Chicago	0–1	St. Louis	OT	Crawford	19,241	0–1	Recap
2	April 15	Chicago	3–2	St. Louis		Crawford	19,846	1–1	Recap
3	April 17	St. Louis	3–2	Chicago		Crawford	22,207	1–2	Recap
4	April 19	St. Louis	4–3	Chicago		Crawford	22,212	1–3	Recap
5	April 21	Chicago	4–3	St. Louis	2OT	Crawford	19,956	2–3	Recap
6	April 23	St. Louis	3–6	Chicago		Crawford	22,260	3–3	Recap
7	April 25	Chicago	2–3	St. Louis		Crawford	19,935	3–4	Recap

Legend: Win Loss

== Player statistics ==
Final stats

=== Skaters ===
Regular season
Player	GP	G	A	Pts	+/−	PIM
Patrick Kane	82	46	60	106	17	30
Artemi Panarin	80	30	47	77	8	32
Jonathan Toews	80	28	30	58	16	62
Brent Seabrook	81	14	35	49	6	32
Duncan Keith	67	9	34	43	13	26
Artem Anisimov	77	20	22	42	8	12
Teuvo Teravainen	78	13	22	35	−2	20
Andrew Shaw	78	14	20	34	11	69
Marian Hossa	64	13	20	33	10	24
Niklas Hjalmarsson	81	2	22	24	13	32
Trevor van Riemsdyk	82	3	11	14	−5	31
Erik Gustafsson	41	0	14	14	11	4
Michal Rozsival	51	1	12	13	3	33
Andrew Desjardins	77	8	5	13	−8	30
Andrew Ladd^{†}	19	8	4	12	−3	6
Dennis Rasmussen	44	4	5	9	9	4
Richard Panik	30	6	2	8	4	6
Ryan Garbutt^{‡}	43	2	4	6	−7	27
Trevor Daley^{‡}	29	0	6	6	1	8
Brandon Mashinter	41	4	1	5	−7	23
Tomas Fleischmann^{†}	19	4	1	5	−7	4
Phillip Danault^{‡}	30	1	4	5	−3	6
Viktor Svedberg	27	2	2	4	−5	4
Marcus Kruger	41	0	4	4	−5	24
Tanner Kero	17	1	2	3	−2	2
Bryan Bickell	25	0	2	2	−5	2
Marko Dano^{‡}	13	1	1	2	0	2
David Rundblad	9	0	2	2	−2	6
Christian Ehrhoff^{†}	8	0	2	2	−1	2
Jiri Sekac^{‡}	6	0	1	1	−1	2
Ryan Hartman	3	0	1	1	−1	0
Dale Weise^{†}	15	0	1	1	4	2
Kyle Baun	2	0	0	0	−2	0
Vinnie Hinostroza	7	0	0	0	−1	6
Mark McNeill	1	0	0	0	0	0
Viktor Tikhonov^{‡}	11	0	0	0	−4	6
Rob Scuderi^{†‡}	17	0	0	0	−6	0

Playoffs
Player	GP	G	A	Pts	+/−	PIM
Artemi Panarin	7	2	5	7	2	14
Patrick Kane	7	1	6	7	−1	14
Andrew Shaw	6	4	2	6	0	18
Jonathan Toews	7	0	6	6	2	10
Duncan Keith	6	3	2	5	3	2
Marian Hossa	7	3	2	5	0	0
Artem Anisimov	7	3	0	3	1	2
Richard Panik	6	0	3	3	0	6
Andrew Ladd	7	1	1	2	−1	16
Brent Seabrook	7	1	1	2	−2	12
Trevor van Riemsdyk	7	1	0	1	−3	2
Dale Weise	4	1	0	1	0	0
Erik Gustafsson	5	0	1	1	−1	0
Teuvo Teravainen	7	0	1	1	1	0
Marcus Kruger	7	0	1	1	−2	0
Niklas Hjalmarsson	7	0	1	1	5	0
Viktor Svedberg	3	0	0	0	0	6
David Rundblad	3	0	0	0	0	4
Brandon Mashinter	2	0	0	0	0	2
Andrew Desjardins	6	0	0	0	−2	0
Tomas Fleischmann	4	0	0	0	−1	0
Michal Rozsival	4	0	0	0	−3	2

=== Goaltenders ===
Regular season
Player	GP	GS	TOI	W	L	OT	GA	GAA	SA	SV%	SO	G	A	PIM
Corey Crawford	58	58	3,323	35	18	5	131	2.37	1,718	.924	7	0	1	2
Scott Darling	29	24	1,560	12	8	4	67	2.58	784	.915	1	0	0	0
Michael Leighton	1	0	39	0	0	0	1	1.54	17	.941	0	0	0	0

Playoffs
Player	GP	GS	TOI	W	L	GA	GAA	SA	SV%	SO	G	A	PIM
Corey Crawford	7	7	448	3	4	19	2.54	205	.907	0	0	0	2

^{†}Denotes player spent time with another team before joining Blackhawks. Stats reflect time with Blackhawks only.
^{‡}Left team mid-season. Stats reflect time with Blackhawks only.

== Awards and honours ==
=== Awards ===
Regular season
Player	Award	Awarded
P. Kane	NHL First Star of the Week	November 9, 2015
P. Kane	NHL First Star of the Month	December 1, 2015
C. Crawford	NHL First Star of the Week	December 14, 2015
P. Kane	NHL All-Star game captain	January 2, 2016
P. Kane	NHL Third Star of the Month	January 4, 2016
J. Toews	NHL All-Star game selection	January 6, 2016
P. Kane	NHL First Star of the Week	January 18, 2016
C. Crawford	NHL Second Star of the Month	February 1, 2016
A. Panarin	NHL First Star of the Week	April 4, 2016
A. Panarin	Calder Memorial Trophy	June 22, 2016
P. Kane	Hart Memorial Trophy	June 22, 2016

=== Milestones ===
Regular season
Player	Milestone	Reached
Artemi Panarin	1st career NHL game 1st career NHL goal 1st career NHL point	October 7, 2015
Viktor Svedberg	1st career NHL game	October 9, 2015
Ryan Garbutt	200th career NHL game	October 9, 2015
Trevor van Riemsdyk	1st career NHL goal	October 10, 2015
Artemi Panarin	1st career NHL assist	October 10, 2015
Viktor Svedberg	1st career NHL goal 1st career NHL point	October 15, 2015
Vinnie Hinostroza	1st career NHL game	October 17, 2015
Tanner Kero	1st career NHL game	October 29, 2015
Erik Gustafsson	1st career NHL game 1st career NHL assist 1st career NHL point	October 30, 2015
Viktor Svedberg	1st career NHL assist	November 2, 2015
Ryan Hartman	1st career NHL assist 1st career NHL point	November 4, 2015
Marcus Kruger	300th career NHL game	November 4, 2015
Tanner Kero	1st career NHL goal 1st career NHL point	November 6, 2015
Andrew Desjardins	300th career NHL game	November 8, 2015
Artem Anisimov	200th career NHL point	November 8, 2015
Tanner Kero	1st career NHL assist	November 18, 2015
Patrick Kane	19 game point streak – American Record (later 26 games); 600th career NHL game	November 28, 2015
Michal Rozsival	900th career NHL game	December 3, 2015
Patrick Kane	22 game point streak – Blackhawks Record (later 26 games)	December 6, 2015
Dennis Rasmussen	1st career NHL game 1st career NHL goal 1st career NHL point	December 8, 2015
Patrick Kane	600th career NHL point	December 8, 2015
Marian Hossa	1,200th career NHL game	December 13, 2015
Niklas Hjalmarsson	500th career NHL game	December 13, 2015
Dennis Rasmussen	1st career NHL assist	December 13, 2015
Brandon Mashinter	1st career NHL goal 1st career NHL point	December 13, 2015
Patrick Kane	1st American born player to score 20 goals in each of their first 9 seasons	December 13, 2015
Jonathan Toews	600th career NHL game	December 20, 2015
Phillip Danault	1st career NHL assist 1st career NHL point	December 20, 2015
Brent Seabrook	800th career NHL game	December 27, 2015
Artem Anisimov	100th career NHL goal	December 31, 2015
Jonathan Toews	4th OT goal this season – Blackhawks Record (later 5 goals)	December 31, 2015
Corey Crawford	300th career NHL game	January 3, 2016
Phillip Danault	1st career NHL goal	January 8, 2016
Duncan Keith	800th career NHL game	January 10, 2016
Joel Quenneville	783rd career NHL coaching win – 2nd all time	January 14, 2016
Patrick Kane	1st career NHL hat-trick	January 15, 2016
Andrew Shaw	300th career NHL game	February 6, 2016
Jonathan Toews	300th career NHL assist	February 6, 2016
Patrick Kane	400th career NHL assist	February 15, 2016
Artemi Panarin	1st career NHL hat-trick	February 17, 2016
Artemi Panarin	1st career NHL playoff goal	April 15, 2016
Trevor van Riemsdyk	1st career NHL playoff goal	April 23, 2016

== Transactions ==
The Blackhawks were involved in the following transactions during the 2015–16 season.

=== Trades ===
Date	Details		Ref
June 27, 2015	To New York Rangers Antti Raanta	To Chicago Blackhawks Ryan Haggerty
June 30, 2015	To Columbus Blue Jackets Brandon Saad; Alex Broadhurst; Michael Paliotta	To Chicago Blackhawks Artem Anisimov; Marko Dano; Jeremy Morin; Corey Tropp; 4th-round pick in 2016
July 6, 2015	To Edmonton Oilers Anders Nilsson	To Chicago Blackhawks Liam Coughlin
July 10, 2015	To Dallas Stars Patrick Sharp; Stephen Johns	To Chicago Blackhawks Trevor Daley; Ryan Garbutt
September 11, 2015	To Carolina Hurricanes Kris Versteeg; Joakim Nordstrom; 3rd-round pick in 2017	To Chicago Blackhawks Dennis Robertson; Jake Massie; 5th-round pick in 2017
December 14, 2015	To Pittsburgh Penguins Trevor Daley	To Chicago Blackhawks Rob Scuderi^{Note 1}
January 3, 2016	To Toronto Maple Leafs Jeremy Morin	To Chicago Blackhawks Richard Panik
January 21, 2016	To Anaheim Ducks Ryan Garbutt	To Chicago Blackhawks Jiri Sekac
February 25, 2016	To Winnipeg Jets Marko Dano; 1st round pick in 2016 conditional 3rd round pick in 2018	To Chicago Blackhawks Andrew Ladd^{Note 2} Jay Harrison; Matt Fraser
February 26, 2016	To Los Angeles Kings Rob Scuderi^{Note 3}	To Chicago Blackhawks Christian Ehrhoff^{Note 4}
February 26, 2016	To Montreal Canadiens Phillip Danault; 2nd round pick in 2018	To Chicago Blackhawks Dale Weise; Tomas Fleischmann
February 29, 2016	To Carolina Hurricanes Dennis Robertson	To Chicago Blackhawks Drew MacIntyre
February 29, 2016	To Anaheim Ducks Corey Tropp	To Chicago Blackhawks Tim Jackman; 7th-round pick in 2017

Notes

- ^{Note 1} Pittsburgh to retain 33% ($1.125 million) of salary as part of trade.
- ^{Note 2} Winnipeg to retain 36% ($1.584 million) of salary as part of trade.
- ^{Note 3} Chicago to retain 50% ($1.125 million) of salary as part of trade.
- ^{Note 4} Los Angeles to retain 15% ($225,000) of salary as part of trade.

=== Free agents acquired ===
Date	Player	Former team	Contract terms (in U.S. dollars)	Ref
July 1, 2015	Viktor Tikhonov	SKA Saint Petersburg	1 year, $1.04 million	
July 2, 2015	Cameron Schilling	Washington Capitals	2 years, $1.15 million	
July 2, 2015	Mike Liambas	Milwaukee Admirals	1 year, $575,000	
August 18, 2015	Nolan Valleau	Bowling Green University	2 year, $1.335 million	
February 28, 2016	Mac Carruth	Rockford IceHogs	1 year, $575,000	
May 24, 2016	Lars Johansson	Frölunda HC	1 year, $575,000	
May 24, 2016	Michal Kempny	Avangard Omsk	1 year, $700,000	
May 24, 2016	Martin Lundberg	Skellefteå AIK	1 year, $692,500	

=== Free agents lost ===
Date	Player	New team	Contract terms (in U.S. dollars)	Ref
July 1, 2015	Brad Richards	Detroit Red Wings	1 year, $3 million	
July 1, 2015	Antoine Vermette	Arizona Coyotes	2 years, $7.5 million	
July 4, 2015	Cody Bass	Nashville Predators	1 year, $575,000	
July 15, 2015	Johnny Oduya	Dallas Stars	2 year, $7.5 million	

=== Claimed via waivers ===
Player	Old team	Date claimed off waivers	Ref

=== Lost via waivers ===
Player	New team	Date	Ref
Viktor Tikhonov	Arizona Coyotes	December 6, 2015	
Jiri Sekac	Arizona Coyotes	February 27, 2016	

=== Lost via retirement ===
Player	Ref
Daniel Carcillo	
Kimmo Timonen	

=== Player signings ===
Date	Player	Contract terms (in U.S. dollars)	Ref
June 29, 2015	David Rundblad	2 years, $2 million	
June 30, 2015	Michael Leighton	1 year, $575,000	
July 1, 2015	Artem Anisimov	5 years, $22.75 million	
July 3, 2015	Andrew Desjardins	2 years, $1.6 million	
July 7, 2015	Trevor van Riemsdyk	2 years, $1.65 million	
July 9, 2015	Dennis Rasmussen	1 year, $575,000	
August 5, 2015	Viktor Svedberg	1 year, $575,000	
September 2, 2015	Joakim Nordstrom	1 year, $605,000	
September 11, 2015	Marcus Kruger	1 year, $1.5 million	
September 19, 2015	Michal Rozsival	1 year, $600,000	
September 26, 2015	Brent Seabrook	8 years, $55 million contract extension	
October 15, 2015	Kyle Cumiskey	1 year, $575,000	
March 3, 2016	Kyle Baun	2 years, contract extension	
March 8, 2016	Marcus Kruger	3 years, $9.25 million contract extension	
March 14, 2016	Viktor Svedberg	2 years, contract extension	
April 4, 2016	Robin Norell	3 years, entry-level contract	
April 6, 2016	Tyler Motte	3 years, entry-level contract	
April 14, 2016	Carl Dahlstrom	3 years, entry-level contract	
April 29, 2016	Luke Johnson	3 years, entry-level contract	
May 11, 2016	Gustav Forsling	3 years, entry-level contract	
June 14, 2016	Mac Carruth	1 year	
June 15, 2016	Richard Panik	1 year	
June 19, 2016	Nick Schmaltz	3 years, entry-level contract	
June 22, 2016	Dennis Rasmussen	1 year	

=== Suspensions/fines ===
Player	Explanation	Length	Salary	Date issued
Jonathan Toews	Missing the NHL All-Star game	1 game		January 28, 2016
Duncan Keith	Striking Minnesota Wild center Charlie Coyle in the face with his stick (intent to injure)	6 games		April 1 – April 13
Andrew Shaw	Uttering an anti-gay slur	1 game		April 21, 2016

== Draft picks ==
Below are the Chicago Blackhawks' selections at the 2015 NHL entry draft, to be held on June 26–27, 2015 at the BB&T Center in Sunrise, Florida.

Round	#	Player	Pos	Nationality	College/Junior/Club team (League)
2	54^{[a]}	Graham Knott	LW	Canada	Niagara IceDogs (OHL)
3	91	Dennis Gilbert	D	United States	Chicago Steel (USHL)
4	121	Ryan Shea	D	United States	Boston College High School (USHS–MA)
5	151	Radovan Bondra	RW	Slovakia	HC Košice (Slovakia)
6	164^{[b]}	Roy Radke	RW	United States	Barrie Colts (OHL)
6	181	Joni Tuulola	D	Finland	HPK (Finland)
7	211	John Dahlstrom	LW/C	Sweden	Frölunda HC Jr. (Sweden-Jr.)

Draft notes

- The Chicago Blackhawks' first-round pick went the Arizona Coyotes as the result of a trade on February 28, 2015, that sent Antoine Vermette to Chicago in exchange for Klas Dahlbeck and this pick.
- ^{a} The Chicago Blackhawks received the 24th pick of this round (54th overall) as compensation for not signing 2010 first-round draft pick Kevin Hayes.
- The Chicago Blackhawks' second-round pick went to the Philadelphia Flyers as the result of a trade on February 27, 2015, that sent Kimmo Timonen to Chicago in exchange for a conditional fourth-round pick in 2016 and this pick.
- ^{b} The Los Angeles Kings' sixth-round pick went the Chicago Blackhawks as the result of a trade on July 16, 2013 that sent Daniel Carcillo to Los Angeles in exchange for this pick (being conditional at the time of the trade). The condition – Chicago will receive a sixth-round pick in 2015 if Carcillo plays less than 40 games with Los Angeles during the 2013–14 NHL season – was converted on January 4, 2014, when Carcillo was traded to the New York Rangers after playing only 26 games with the Kings.
