= 2015–16 Dallas Stars season =

National Hockey League team season

2015–16 Dallas Stars
- Central Division champions
- Division: 1st Central
- Conference: 1st Western
- 2015–16 record: 50–23–9
- Home record: 28–11–2
- Road record: 22–12–7
- Goals for: 267
- Goals against: 230

Team information
- General manager: Jim Nill
- Coach: Lindy Ruff
- Captain: Jamie Benn
- Alternate captains: Vernon Fiddler; Alex Goligoski
- Arena: American Airlines Center
- Average attendance: 18,342 (30 games)
- Minor league affiliate: Texas Stars (AHL)

Team leaders
- Goals: Jamie Benn (41)
- Assists: Jamie Benn; John Klingberg (48)
- Points: Jamie Benn (89)
- Penalty minutes: Antoine Roussel (123)
- Plus/minus: John Klingberg (+22)
- Wins: Kari Lehtonen; Antti Niemi (25)
- Goals against average: Antti Niemi (2.67)

The 2015–16 Dallas Stars season was the 49th season for the National Hockey League (NHL) franchise that was established on June 5, 1967, and 23rd season since the franchise relocated from Minnesota prior to the start of the 1993–94 NHL season.

== Standings ==
Central Division
Pos	Team	GP	W	L	OTL	ROW	GF	GA	GD	Pts
1	z – Dallas Stars	82	50	23	9	48	267	230	+37	109
2	x – St. Louis Blues	82	49	24	9	44	224	201	+23	107
3	x – Chicago Blackhawks	82	47	26	9	46	235	209	+26	103
4	x – Nashville Predators	82	41	27	14	37	228	215	+13	96
5	x – Minnesota Wild	82	38	33	11	35	216	206	+10	87
6	Colorado Avalanche	82	39	39	4	35	216	240	−24	82
7	Winnipeg Jets	82	35	39	8	32	215	239	−24	78

Source: National Hockey League
x – Clinched playoff spot; z – Clinched conference

== Schedule and results ==
=== Pre-season ===
Preseason game log: 1–6–0 (Home: 1–2–0; Road: 0–4–0)
#	Date	Visitor	Score	Home	OT	Decision	Attendance	Record	Recap
1	September 22	Dallas	2–3	Florida		Campbell	5,504	0–1–0	Recap
2	September 24	Dallas	0–6	St. Louis		Lehtonen	11,876	0–2–0	Recap
3	September 26	Tampa Bay	3–6	Dallas		Niemi	14,676	1–2–0	Recap
4	September 27	Florida	4–2	Dallas		Lehtonen	10,113	1–3–0	Recap
5	September 29	St. Louis	4–1	Dallas		Niemi	11,544	1–4–0	Recap
6	October 1	Dallas	2–3	Tampa Bay		Lehtonen	14,226	1–5–0	Recap
7	October 3	Dallas	0–4	Chicago		Niemi	21,221	1–6–0	Recap

=== Regular season ===
Game log

October: 9–2–0 (Home: 5–1–0; Road: 4–1–0) 18 pts
#	Date	Visitor	Score	Home	OT	Decision	Attendance	Record	Pts	Recap
1	October 8	Pittsburgh	0–3	Dallas		Niemi	18,532	1–0–0	2	Recap
2	October 10	Dallas	3–6	Colorado		Niemi	16,024	1–1–0	2	Recap
3	October 13	Edmonton	2–4	Dallas		Lehtonen	16,265	2–1–0	4	Recap
4	October 15	Dallas	5–3	Tampa Bay		Lehtonen	19,092	3–1–0	6	Recap
5	October 17	Dallas	4–2	Florida		Lehtonen	12,834	4–1–0	8	Recap
6	October 20	Dallas	2–1	Philadelphia		Niemi	19,077	5–1–0	10	Recap
7	October 22	Dallas	4–1	Pittsburgh		Niemi	18,490	6–1–0	12	Recap
8	October 24	Florida	6–2	Dallas		Lehtonen	18,532	6–2–0	12	Recap
9	October 27	Anaheim	3–4	Dallas		Niemi	17,798	7–2–0	14	Recap
10	October 29	Vancouver	3–4	Dallas	OT	Niemi	17,664	8–2–0	16	Recap
11	October 31	San Jose	3–5	Dallas		Niemi	18,178	9–2–0	18	Recap

November: 10–3–0 (Home: 4–2–0; Road: 6–1–0) 20 pts
#	Date	Visitor	Score	Home	OT	Decision	Attendance	Record	Pts	Recap
12	November 2	Dallas	1–4	Toronto		Niemi	19,087	9–3–0	18	Recap
13	November 3	Dallas	5–3	Boston		Lehtonen	17,565	10–3–0	20	Recap
14	November 6	Dallas	4–1	Carolina		Lehtonen	10,188	11–3–0	22	Recap
15	November 8	Dallas	4–1	Detroit		Lehtonen	20,027	12–3–0	24	Recap
16	November 10	Toronto	3–2	Dallas		Niemi	18,266	12–4–0	24	Recap
17	November 12	Winnipeg	3–6	Dallas		Lehtonen	18,010	13–4–0	26	Recap
18	November 14	Minnesota	2–3	Dallas	OT	Lehtonen	18,532	14–4–0	28	Recap
19	November 17	Dallas	3–1	Buffalo		Niemi	18,101	15–4–0	30	Recap
20	November 19	Dallas	3–2	Washington		Lehtonen	18,506	16–4–0	32	Recap
21	November 21	Buffalo	0–3	Dallas		Niemi	18,532	17–4–0	34	Recap
22	November 24	Ottawa	7–4	Dallas		Niemi	18,532	17–5–0	34	Recap
23	November 27	Vancouver	2–3	Dallas	SO	Niemi	18,532	18–5–0	36	Recap
24	November 28	Dallas	4–3	Minnesota	OT	Niemi	19,024	19–5–0	38	Recap

December: 9–3–3 (Home: 7–1–0; Road: 2–2–3) 21 pts
#	Date	Visitor	Score	Home	OT	Decision	Attendance	Record	Pts	Recap
25	December 1	Dallas	3–4	Calgary	SO	Niemi	19,237	19–5–1	39	Recap
26	December 3	Dallas	4–2	Vancouver		Lehtonen	18,302	20–5–1	41	Recap
27	December 4	Dallas	1–2	Edmonton	OT	Niemi	16,839	20–5–2	42	Recap
28	December 8	Carolina	5–6	Dallas		Niemi	18,287	21–5–2	44	Recap
29	December 11	Philadelphia	1–3	Dallas		Niemi	18,532	22–5–2	46	Recap
30	December 12	Dallas	0–3	St. Louis		Niemi	15,023	22–6–2	46	Recap
31	December 15	Columbus	1–5	Dallas		Lehtonen	18,232	23–6–2	48	Recap
32	December 17	Calgary	3–1	Dallas		Lehtonen	18,410	23–7–2	48	Recap
33	December 19	Montreal	2–6	Dallas		Niemi	18,532	24–7–2	50	Recap
34	December 21	Dallas	6–3	Minnesota		Niemi	19,047	25–7–2	52	Recap
35	December 22	Chicago	0–4	Dallas		Niemi	18,532	26–7–2	54	Recap
36	December 26	Dallas	2–3	St. Louis	SO	Niemi	19,185	26–7–3	55	Recap
37	December 27	St. Louis	0–3	Dallas		Lehtonen	18,532	27–7–3	57	Recap
38	December 29	Dallas	3–6	Columbus		Lehtonen	15,836	27–8–3	57	Recap
39	December 31	Nashville	1–5	Dallas		Niemi	18,532	28–8–3	59	Recap

January: 3–6–2 (Home: 3–2–0; Road: 0–4–2) 8 pts
#	Date	Visitor	Score	Home	OT	Decision	Attendance	Record	Pts	Recap
40	January 2	Dallas	2–3	New Jersey	OT	Niemi	16,514	28–8–4	60	Recap
41	January 3	Dallas	5–6	NY Islanders		Lehtonen	14,054	28–9–4	60	Recap
42	January 5	Dallas	2–6	NY Rangers		Niemi	18,006	28–10–4	60	Recap
43	January 7	Winnipeg	1–2	Dallas	SO	Lehtonen	18,532	29–10–4	62	Recap
44	January 9	Minnesota	2–1	Dallas		Niemi	18,532	29–11–4	62	Recap
45	January 15	Dallas	2–4	Anaheim		Lehtonen	16,201	29–12–4	62	Recap
46	January 16	Dallas	3–4	San Jose	OT	Niemi	17,562	29–12–5	63	Recap
47	January 19	Dallas	2–3	Los Angeles		Lehtonen	18,230	29–13–5	63	Recap
48	January 21	Edmonton	2–3	Dallas		Niemi	18,532	30–13–5	65	Recap
49	January 23	Colorado	3–1	Dallas		Niemi	18,532	30–14–5	65	Recap
50	January 25	Calgary	1–2	Dallas		Niemi	18,532	31–14–5	67	Recap

February: 7–5–2 (Home: 1–4–1; Road: 6–1–1) 16 pts
#	Date	Visitor	Score	Home	OT	Decision	Attendance	Record	Pts	Recap
51	February 2	Dallas	5–3	Winnipeg		Niemi	15,294	32–14–5	69	Recap
52	February 4	Dallas	4–3	Colorado	OT	Niemi	14,351	33–14–5	71	Recap
53	February 6	Chicago	5–1	Dallas		Niemi	18,532	33–15–5	71	Recap
54	February 9	Dallas	4–3	Minnesota	OT	Niemi	19,087	34–15–5	73	Recap
55	February 11	Dallas	4–2	Chicago		Lehtonen	22,051	35–15–5	75	Recap
56	February 13	Washington	3–4	Dallas		Lehtonen	18,532	36–15–5	77	Recap
57	February 15	Dallas	3–2	Nashville	OT	Niemi	17,113	37–15–5	79	Recap
58	February 16	Dallas	1–2	St. Louis	OT	Lehtonen	18,156	37–15–6	80	Recap
59	February 18	Dallas	3–6	Arizona		Niemi	11,853	37–16–6	80	Recap
60	February 20	Boston	7–3	Dallas		Lehtonen	18,532	37–17–6	80	Recap
61	February 23	Dallas	5–3	Winnipeg		Niemi	15,294	38–17–6	82	Recap
62	February 25	Winnipeg	6–3	Dallas		Lehtonen	18,532	38–18–6	82	Recap
63	February 27	NY Rangers	3–2	Dallas		Lehtonen	18,532	38–19–6	82	Recap
64	February 29	Detroit	3–2	Dallas	OT	Niemi	18,532	38–19–7	83	Recap

March: 9–3–2 (Home: 6–1–1; Road: 3–2–1) 20 pts
#	Date	Visitor	Score	Home	OT	Decision	Attendance	Record	Pts	Recap
65	March 1	Dallas	3–5	Nashville		Niemi	17,113	38–20–7	83	Recap
66	March 4	New Jersey	2–4	Dallas		Lehtonen	18,117	39–20–7	85	Recap
67	March 6	Dallas	2–1	Ottawa		Lehtonen	19,419	40–20–7	87	Recap
68	March 8	Dallas	3–4	Montreal	OT	Lehtonen	21,288	40–20–8	88	Recap
69	March 11	Chicago	2–5	Dallas		Lehtonen	18,532	41–20–8	90	Recap
70	March 12	St. Louis	5–4	Dallas	OT	Niemi	18,532	41–20–9	91	Recap
71	March 15	Los Angeles	5–2	Dallas		Lehtonen	18,532	41–21–9	91	Recap
72	March 17	Tampa Bay	3–4	Dallas		Lehtonen	18,532	42–21–9	93	Recap
73	March 19	NY Islanders	0–3	Dallas		Lehtonen	18,532	43–21–9	95	Recap
74	March 22	Dallas	6–2	Chicago		Lehtonen	22,034	44–21–9	97	Recap
75	March 24	Dallas	1–3	Arizona		Lehtonen	11,887	44–22–9	97	Recap
76	March 26	Dallas	4–2	San Jose		Niemi	16,439	45–22–9	99	Recap
77	March 29	Nashville	2–5	Dallas		Lehtonen	18,265	46–22–9	101	Recap
78	March 31	Arizona	1–4	Dallas		Niemi	18,532	47–22–9	103	Recap

April: 3–1–0 (Home: 2–0–0; Road: 1–1–0) 6 pts
#	Date	Visitor	Score	Home	OT	Decision	Attendance	Record	Pts	Recap
79	April 2	Dallas	3–2	Los Angeles		Lehtonen	18,230	48–22–9	105	Recap
80	April 3	Dallas	1–3	Anaheim		Niemi	16,585	48–23–9	105	Recap
81	April 7	Colorado	2–4	Dallas		Lehtonen	18,532	49–23–9	107	Recap
82	April 9	Nashville	2–3	Dallas		Niemi	18,532	50–23–9	109	Recap

Legend: Win (2 points) Loss (0 points) Overtime/shootout loss (1 point)

== Playoffs ==
2016 Stanley Cup playoffs

Western Conference First Round vs. (WC) Minnesota Wild: Dallas wins 4–2
#	Date	Visitor	Score	Home	OT	Decision	Attendance	Series	Recap
1	April 14	Minnesota	0–4	Dallas		Lehtonen	18,532	1–0	Recap
2	April 16	Minnesota	1–2	Dallas		Lehtonen	18,988	2–0	Recap
3	April 18	Dallas	3–5	Minnesota		Lehtonen	19,038	2–1	Recap
4	April 20	Dallas	3–2	Minnesota		Niemi	19,080	3–1	Recap
5	April 22	Minnesota	5–4	Dallas	OT	Niemi	18,889	3–2	Recap
6	April 24	Dallas	5–4	Minnesota		Lehtonen	19,310	4–2	Recap

Western Conference Second Round vs. (C2) St. Louis Blues: St. Louis wins 4–3
#	Date	Visitor	Score	Home	OT	Decision	Attendance	Series	Recap
1	April 29	St. Louis	1–2	Dallas		Lehtonen	18,532	1–0	Recap
2	May 1	St. Louis	4–3	Dallas	OT	Niemi	18,889	1–1	Recap
3	May 3	Dallas	1–6	St. Louis		Niemi	19,323	1–2	Recap
4	May 5	Dallas	3–2	St. Louis	OT	Lehtonen	19,770	2–2	Recap
5	May 7	St. Louis	4–1	Dallas		Lehtonen	18,754	2–3	Recap
6	May 9	Dallas	3–2	St. Louis		Lehtonen	19,808	3–3	Recap
7	May 11	St. Louis	6–1	Dallas		Lehtonen	18,754	3–4	Recap

Legend: Win Loss

== Player statistics ==
Final stats

=== Skaters ===
Regular season
Player	GP	G	A	Pts	+/−	PIM
Jamie Benn	82	41	48	89	7	64
Tyler Seguin	72	33	40	73	2	16
Jason Spezza	75	33	30	63	4	22
John Klingberg	76	10	48	58	22	30
Patrick Sharp	76	20	35	55	−3	27
Ales Hemsky	75	13	26	39	3	20
Alex Goligoski	82	5	32	37	21	34
Cody Eakin	82	16	19	35	3	42
Mattias Janmark	73	15	14	29	12	16
Antoine Roussel	80	13	16	29	11	123
Valeri Nichushkin	79	9	20	29	2	12
Colton Sceviour	71	11	12	23	6	21
Jason Demers	62	7	16	23	16	72
Vernon Fiddler	82	12	10	22	5	31
Johnny Oduya	82	4	17	21	8	26
Patrick Eaves	54	11	6	17	−5	27
Radek Faksa	45	5	7	12	9	16
Jordie Benn	64	3	9	12	2	21
Patrik Nemeth	38	0	8	8	−1	14
Jyrki Jokipakka	40	2	4	6	1	6
Kris Russell^{†}	11	0	4	4	−1	2
Stephen Johns	14	1	2	3	−6	6
Travis Moen	23	0	2	2	−3	21
Jamie Oleksiak	19	0	2	2	−5	21
Jason Dickinson	1	1	0	1	1	0
Brett Ritchie	8	0	1	1	−3	7
Curtis McKenzie	3	0	0	0	−1	0
Esa Lindell	4	0	0	0	−3	0
Devin Shore	3	0	0	0	2	0

Playoffs
Player	GP	G	A	Pts	+/−	PIM
Jamie Benn	13	5	10	15	2	10
Jason Spezza	13	5	8	13	0	2
Cody Eakin	13	1	7	8	−4	8
Alex Goligoski	13	4	3	7	−6	6
Patrick Sharp	13	4	2	6	−4	0
Patrick Eaves	9	3	3	6	3	2
Radek Faksa	13	3	2	5	2	2
Mattias Janmark	12	2	3	5	−3	2
Colton Sceviour	11	2	3	5	1	0
John Klingberg	13	1	3	4	−5	2
Ales Hemsky	13	1	3	4	−1	2
Kris Russell	12	0	4	4	1	4
Johnny Oduya	13	1	2	3	1	2
Vernon Fiddler	13	1	2	3	−1	8
Jason Demers	13	0	3	3	1	8
Antoine Roussel	13	2	0	2	0	16
Valeri Nichushkin	10	0	1	1	−2	2
Travis Moen	6	0	0	0	−1	2
Jordie Benn	1	0	0	0	2	4
Curtis McKenzie	1	0	0	0	0	5
Stephen Johns	13	0	0	0	0	6
Tyler Seguin	1	0	0	0	0	0
Brett Ritchie	2	0	0	0	−2	0

=== Goaltenders ===
Regular season
Player	GP	GS	TOI	W	L	OT	GA	GAA	SA	SV%	SO	G	A	PIM
Antti Niemi	48	43	2654	25	13	7	118	2.67	1246	.905	3	0	2	2
Kari Lehtonen	43	39	2279	25	10	2	105	2.76	1121	.906	2	0	3	2

Playoffs
Player	GP	GS	TOI	W	L	GA	GAA	SA	SV%	SO	G	A	PIM
Kari Lehtonen	11	10	555	6	3	26	2.81	257	.899	1	0	0	0
Antti Niemi	5	3	237	1	3	13	3.29	96	.865	0	0	0	0

^{†}Denotes player spent time with another team before joining the Stars. Stats reflect time with the Stars only.
^{‡}Traded mid-season
Bold/italics denotes franchise record

=== Suspensions/fines ===
Player	Explanation	Length	Salary	Date issued
Jason Demers	Elbowing Pittsburgh Penguins forward Nick Bonino during NHL game No. 93 in Pittsburgh on Thursday, October 22, 2015, at 16:48 of the third period.	2 games	$36,559.14	October 23, 2015

== Awards and honors ==
=== Awards ===
Regular season
Player	Award	Awarded
T. Seguin	NHL Second Star of the Week	October 19, 2015
Ja. Benn	NHL First Star of the Month	November 2, 2015
T. Seguin	NHL Second Star of the Week	November 9, 2015
Ja. Benn	NHL First Star of the Week	November 30, 2015
A. Niemi	NHL Second Star of the Week	December 28, 2015
T. Seguin	NHL All-Star game selection	January 6, 2016
Ja. Benn	NHL All-Star game selection	January 6, 2016

=== Milestones ===
Regular season
Player	Milestone	Reached
M. Janmark	1st career NHL game 1st career NHL goal 1st career NHL point	October 8, 2015
J. Demers	100th career NHL assist	October 10, 2015
C. Sceviour	100th career NHL game	October 13, 2015
M. Janmark	1st career NHL assist	October 13, 2015
K. Lehtonen	250th career NHL win	October 15, 2015
R. Faksa	1st career NHL game	October 17, 2015
A. Niemi	20,000 career NHL minutes	October 27, 2015
D. Shore	1st career NHL game	November 3, 2015
T. Seguin	300th career NHL point	November 3, 2015
J. Jokipakka	1st career NHL goal	November 3, 2015
R. Faksa	1st career NHL goal 1st career NHL point	November 6, 2015
V. Nichushkin	100th career NHL game	November 8, 2015
A. Goligoski	500th career NHL game	November 19, 2015
Jo. Benn	200th career NHL game	November 19, 2015
K. Lehtonen	30,000 career NHL minutes	November 19, 2015
P. Eaves	500th career NHL game	November 28, 2015
A. Niemi	200th career NHL wins	November 28, 2015
Ja. Benn	400th career NHL point	December 15, 2015
J. Spezza	800th career NHL game	December 17, 2015
A. Goligoski	200th career NHL assist	December 19, 2015
J. Klingberg	100th career NHL game	December 22, 2015
J. Oduya	700th career NHL game	December 26, 2015
J. Spezza	500th career NHL assist	January 5, 2016

== Transactions ==
The Stars have been involved in the following transactions during the 2015–16 season:

=== Trades ===
Date	Details		Ref
June 27, 2015	To San Jose Sharks 7th-round pick in 2015	To Dallas Stars Antti Niemi (rights)
July 10, 2015	To Chicago Blackhawks Trevor Daley; Ryan Garbutt	To Dallas Stars Patrick Sharp; Stephen Johns
February 29, 2016	To Calgary Flames Jyrki Jokipakka; Brett Pollock; Conditional 2nd-round pick in 2016	To Dallas Stars Kris Russell

=== Free agents acquired ===
Date	Player	Former team	Contract terms (in U.S. dollars)	Ref
July 15, 2015	Johnny Oduya	Chicago Blackhawks	2 years, $7.5 million	

=== Free agents lost ===
Date	Player	New team	Contract terms (in U.S. dollars)	Ref
July 1, 2015	Jhonas Enroth	Los Angeles Kings	1 year, $1.25 million	
July 3, 2015	Shawn Horcoff	Anaheim Ducks	1 year, $1.75 million	

=== Claimed via waivers ===
Player	Previous team	Date	Ref

=== Lost via waivers ===
Player	New team	Date	Ref

=== Lost via retirement ===
Date	Player	Ref
September 4, 2015	Rich Peverley	

=== Player signings ===
Date	Player	Contract terms (in U.S. dollars)	Ref
June 29, 2015	Antti Niemi	3 years, $13.5 million	
July 1, 2015	Patrick Eaves	1 year, $1.15 million	
July 1, 2015	Curtis McKenzie	2 years, $1.35 million	
July 9, 2015	Jamie Oleksiak	1 year, $875,000	
August 28, 2015	Cody Eakin	4 years, $15.4 million contract extension	
March 18, 2016	Stephen Johns	2 years, contract extension	
March 25, 2016	Niklas Hansson	3 years, entry-level contract	
May 12, 2016	Denis Gurianov	3 years, entry-level contract	
May 18, 2016	Chris Martenet	3 years, entry-level contract	
May 31, 2016	Justin Dowling	1 year	
May 31, 2016	Brendan Ranford	1 year	
June 9, 2016	Mattias Backman	1 year	
June 10, 2016	Brett Ritchie	1 year	

== Draft picks ==
Below are the Dallas Stars' selections at the 2015 NHL entry draft, to be held on June 26–27, 2015 at the BB&T Center in Sunrise, Florida.

Round	#	Player	Pos	Nationality	College/Junior/Club team (League)
1	12	Denis Guryanov	RW	Russia	Lada Togliatti-2 (Russia-Jr.)
2	49^{[a]}	Roope Hintz	LW	Finland	Ilves (Finland)
4	103	Chris Martenet	D	United States	London Knights (OHL)
5	133	Joseph Cecconi	D	United States	Muskegon Lumberjacks (USHL)
6	163	Markus Ruusu	G	Finland	JYP Jr. (Finland-Jr.)

Draft notes

- The Dallas Stars' second-round pick went to the New Jersey Devils as the result of a trade on June 27, 2015 that sent a second-round pick in 2015 (36th overall) to Ottawa in exchange for a conditional fourth-round pick in 2015 or 2016 and this pick. Ottawa previously acquired this pick as the result of a trade on July 1, 2014 that sent Jason Spezza and Ludwig Karlsson to the Stars in exchange for Alex Chiasson, Nick Paul, Alex Guptill and this pick.
- ^{a} The Detroit Red Wings' second-round pick went to the Dallas Stars as the result of a trade on March 1, 2015 that sent Erik Cole and a conditional third-round pick in 2015 to Detroit in exchange for Mattias Janmark, Mattias Backman and this pick.
- The Dallas Stars' third-round pick went to the Detroit Red Wings as the result of a trade on March 1, 2015 that sent Mattias Janmark, Mattias Backman, and a second-round pick in 2015 to Dallas in exchange for Erik Cole and this pick (being conditional at the time of the trade). The condition – Detroit will receive a third-round pick in 2015 if they do not qualify for the 2015 Eastern Conference Final and Cole does not play in 50% of Detroit's playoff games – was converted on April 8, 2015 when Cole was injured for the remainder of the season.
- The Dallas Stars' seventh-round pick went to the San Jose Sharks as the result of a trade on June 27, 2015 that sent Antti Niemi to Dallas in exchange for this pick.
