= Garbett =

Garbett is a surname. Notable people with the surname include:

- Cyril Garbett (1875–1955), Anglican clergyman and Archbishop of York from 1942 until 1955
- Eddie Garbett (born 1949), English professional footballer
- Edward Garbett (1817–1887), British religious figure and writer
- James Garbett (1802–1879), British academic and clergyman who became Archdeacon of Chichester
- Lee Garbett, British comic book artist born in the West Midlands
- Len Garbett (1919–2009), English professional rugby league footballer
- Matthew Garbett (born 2002), New Zealand professional footballer
- Paul Garbett (born 1952), New Zealand chess player
- Samuel Garbett (died 1803), English industrialist
- Spencer Garbett (1969–1997), American actor, model, and television host
- Terry Garbett (born 1945), English footballer
- Toby Garbett (born 1976), British rower
- Marjorie Maynard (1891–1975), also known as Lady C. C. Garbett, British artist

== See also ==
- Garbett's Wood in West Sussex, England
- Samuel Garbet, 18th-century English topographer
- Garbeta
- Garbutt (disambiguation)
