= Garbutt (name) =

Garbutt is a surname associated with English-speaking culture.

== Etymology ==
In origin, Garbutt is a personal name. It (and the variants Garbut, Garbett, Garbet, Garbert, Garbould, Gorbold, Gorbutt, Gorbett, Gorbert, Carbett, Carbert, Carbutt, Carbould, and Carbott) come from several different names which were brought to England by settlers associated with the Norman Conquest: Gerbold, Gerbert, and Gerbod. All these names themselves came into use among the Normans by borrowing from Continental Germanic, and became confused with one another already in the Middle Ages.

== Distribution ==
In the spelling Garbutt, the name was borne by 2163 people in the 1881 Census of the United Kingdom, mostly in Yorkshire and County Durham, particularly in the North Riding. As of around 2016, 2877 people bore the name in Great Britain and 72 in Ireland.

== Notable people ==
- Arthur M. Garbutt, American architect
- George Garbutt (1903–1967), Canadian ice hockey player
- Ian Garbutt (born 1972), English golfer
- James Garbutt (1925–2020), British actor
- Joe Garbutt (disambiguation), multiple people
- John Garbutt (ca. 1779–1855), New York politician
- John Garbutt (alderman) (born 1954), British alderman
- Josh Garbutt (born 1984), Canadian professional ice hockey player
- Luke Garbutt (born 1993), English footballer
- Mitch Garbutt (born 1989), Australian rugby league footballer
- Ryan Garbutt (born 1985), Canadian ice hockey player
- Sherryl Garbutt (born 1948), Australian politician
- TyJuan Garbutt (born 1999), American football player
- Vin Garbutt (1947–2017), English folk singer and songwriter
- William Garbutt (1883–1964), English football player and coach

== See also ==
- Garbutt (disambiguation)
