= Garbutt =

Garbutt may refer to:

== Places ==
- Garbutt, New York, a hamlet between Scottsville and Mumford
- Garbutt, Queensland, a suburb in the city of Townsville, in Australia
- Garbutt House, Frank A. Garbutt's mansion in the Silver Lake section of Los Angeles

== Surname ==
- Garbutt (name)

== See also ==
- Garbett, a surname
