= Joe Garbutt =

Joe Garbutt may refer to:

- Joe Garbutt (footballer, born 1878) (1878–1948), Australian rules footballer for South Melbourne
- Joe Garbutt Jr. (1903–1971), Australian rules footballer for St Kilda
