= Viktor Svedberg =

Swedish-Kazakhstani ice hockey player

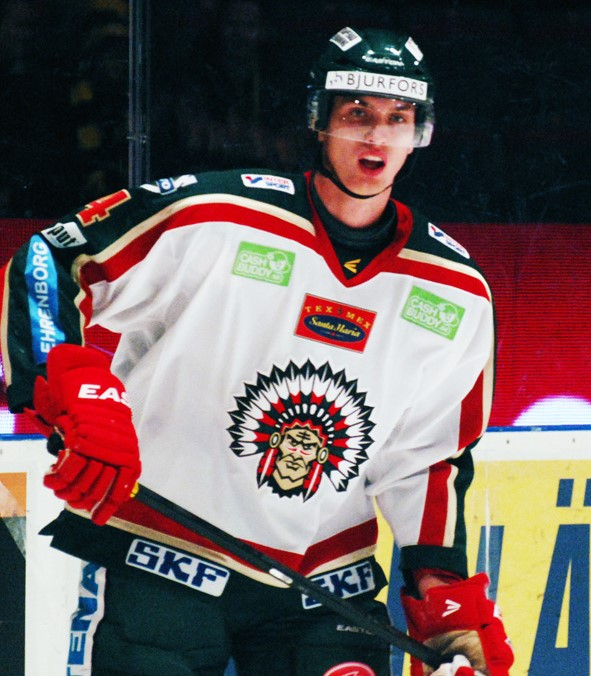
- Born: 24 May 1991 (age 35) Gothenburg, Sweden
- Height: 6 ft 8 in (203 cm)
- Weight: 234 lb (106 kg; 16 st 10 lb)
- Position: Defense
- Shoots: Left
- team Former teams: Free agent Rögle BK; Frölunda HC; Chicago Blackhawks; Linköpings HC; Barys Nur-Sultan; CSKA Moscow; Avangard Omsk; HK Poprad
- National team: Kazakhstan
- NHL draft: Undrafted
- Playing career: 2010–present

Viktor Svedberg (born 24 May 1991) is a Swedish-Kazakhstani professional ice hockey defenceman. He is currently a free agent.

Svedberg was signed by the Chicago Blackhawks of the National Hockey League (NHL) in October 2013, where he spent five seasons.

== Playing career ==
After spending seasons with Rögle BK of J18, Svedberg joined Frölunda HC. He made his Elitserien debut during the 2010-11 season. Svedberg remained with the club through the 2012–13 season.

On 16 May 2013, Svedberg signed with the Rockford IceHogs of the American Hockey League (AHL). After just four games with the club during the 2013–14 season, Svedberg was signed by the IceHogs' National Hockey League (NHL) affiliate, the Chicago Blackhawks to a two-year contract on 19 October 2013. Svedberg spent the remainder of the season, as well as the entirety of the 2014-15 season with the IceHogs.

On 5 August 2015, the Blackhawks re-signed Svedberg to a one-year contract extension. While spending majority of the 2015–16 season with the IceHogs, Svedberg appeared in 27 games for the Blackhawks. On 15 October, in just his fourth career game, Svedberg scored his first career NHL goal in a 4–1 loss to the Washington Capitals. Svedberg finished the season with four points in 27 games. On 14 March 2016, the Blackhawks signed Svedberg to a two-year contract extension.

After leaving the Blackhawks' organization following the 2017–18 season, Svedberg signed a professional tryout agreement to attend the Calgary Flames' training camp on 7 September 2018. He briefly returned to his native Sweden playing 7 games in the SHL with Linköpings HC before on December 2, 2018, Svedberg signed a contract with Barys Astana in the KHL.

After three seasons with Barys and accepting Kazakhstani citizenship, Svedberg left as a free agent and secured a three-year contract with Russian club, HC CSKA Moscow, on 7 June 2021.

== Career statistics ==
=== Regular season and playoffs ===
			Regular season					Playoffs
Season	Team	League	GP	G	A	Pts	PIM	GP	G	A	Pts	PIM
2007–08	Rögle BK	J18	27	3	7	10	28	—	—	—	—	—
2008–09	Rögle BK	J18	11	1	4	5	24	—	—	—	—	—
2008–09	Rögle BK	J20	38	5	11	16	79	—	—	—	—	—
2009–10	Frölunda HC	J20	40	4	10	14	85	—	—	—	—	—
2010–11	Frölunda HC	J20	41	5	17	22	73	7	0	1	1	10
2010–11	Frölunda HC	SEL	9	0	0	0	0	—	—	—	—	—
2011–12	Frölunda HC	J20	6	1	2	3	4	—	—	—	—	—
2011–12	Frölunda HC	SEL	55	3	2	5	20	6	0	0	0	0
2012–13	Frölunda HC	J20	1	0	0	0	2	—	—	—	—	—
2012–13	Frölunda HC	SEL	51	0	2	2	24	6	0	0	0	4
2013–14	Rockford IceHogs	AHL	35	2	7	9	26	—	—	—	—	—
2014–15	Rockford IceHogs	AHL	49	3	11	14	41	8	0	4	4	8
2015–16	Chicago Blackhawks	NHL	27	2	2	4	4	3	0	0	0	6
2015–16	Rockford IceHogs	AHL	40	1	14	15	39	—	—	—	—	—
2016–17	Rockford IceHogs	AHL	51	2	9	11	70	—	—	—	—	—
2017–18	Rockford IceHogs	AHL	73	6	18	24	82	13	0	5	5	18
2018–19	Linköpings HC	SHL	7	1	1	2	6	—	—	—	—	—
2018–19	Barys Astana	KHL	29	3	6	9	16	12	0	2	2	36
2019–20	Barys Nur-Sultan	KHL	10	0	1	1	4	5	0	2	2	4
2020–21	Barys Nur-Sultan	KHL	28	3	5	8	16	—	—	—	—	—
2021–22	CSKA Moscow	KHL	33	2	1	3	14	—	—	—	—	—
2021–22	Avangard Omsk	KHL	8	0	2	2	6	13	0	2	2	6
2022–23	Avangard Omsk	KHL	35	0	3	3	39	10	2	2	4	30
2023–24	HK Poprad	KHL	9	0	1	1	29	5	1	0	1	6
2024–25	HC Pustertal Wölfe	ICE	25	0	0	5	13	8	1	2	3	8
SHL totals			122	4	5	9	50	12	0	0	0	4
NHL totals			27	2	2	4	4	3	0	0	0	6
KHL totals			143	8	18	26	95	40	2	8	10	76

=== International ===
Year	Team	Event	Result	GP	G	A	Pts	PIM
2021	Kazakhstan	WC	10th	6	1	3	4	6
2022	Kazakhstan	WC	14th	4	0	0	0	4
Senior totals				10	1	3	4	10
