= Garbett's Wood =

Woodland in West Sussex, England

- Location within West Sussex
- Interactive map of Garbett's Wood

Geography
- Location: West Sussex, England
- OS grid: SU808236
- Coordinates: 51.006°N 0.849°W
- Area: 2.47 hectares (6.10 acres)

Administration
- Authority: Woodland Trust

Garbett's Wood is a woodland in West Sussex, England, in Rogate. It covers a total area of 2.47 hectares (6.10 acres). It is owned and managed by the Woodland Trust.
