= Spencer Garbett =

American actor and model (1969–1997)

- Born: Spencer George Garbett; December 25, 1969; Miami, Miami-Dade County, Florida, U.S.
- Died: November 18, 1997 (aged 27); Los Angeles, California, U.S.
- Education: University of Southern California
- Occupations: Model; Actor; Host
- Years active: 1992–1997

Spencer George Garbett (December 25, 1969 – November 18, 1997) was an American actor, model, and television host. He gained recognition in the 1990s as a print model for men's fashion catalogs, a multiple-time winner on Star Search, and a field correspondent for the fX network.

== Early life and education ==
He was born in Miami, Florida, Garbett initially studied with the goal of entering dentistry before moving to Los Angeles to pursue entertainment. He attended the University of Southern California (USC), participating in theatrical productions and graduating in 1992 with a Bachelor of Arts in drama.

== Career ==
=== Modeling ===
Garbett became a six-time winner in the "Male Spokesperson" category on Star Search. Throughout the 1990s, he was a leading print model for catalogs like International Male and Undergear, and was featured on the cover of the 1995 Male Image calendar.

=== Acting ===
He served as a roving field reporter—dubbed the "Road Warrior"—for the fX morning show Breakfast Time, hosted by Tom Bergeron and Laurie Hibberd. His acting credits included appearances in Saved by the Bell: The College Years, the television film Once in a Lifetime, and an episode of the Fox sci-fi series Sliders.

He was featured in a fitness profile and interview segment in the Men's Workout magazine in April 1998 issue, which served as a posthumous tribute highlighting his modeling legacy.

== Death ==
Garbett died by suicide from a self-inflicted gunshot wound in Los Angeles on November 18, 1997, at the age of 27. A memorial service was held at Forest Lawn Memorial Park, and his family requested donations to the Make-A-Wish Foundation of Greater Los Angeles in lieu of flowers. His final resting commemoration is at Caballero Rivero Woodlawn Park Cemetery South in Miami.

== Filmography ==
=== Television ===
Year	Title	Role	Notes
1992	Star Search	Himself	6-time winner ("Male Spokesperson")
1993	Saved by the Bell: The College Years	Bob	Sitcom appearance
1994–1996	Breakfast Time	"Road Warrior" Correspondent	Roving live field reporter
1997	Sliders	Roger	Season 3, Episode 19: "The Breeder"

=== Film ===
Year	Title	Role	Notes
1994	Once in a Lifetime	Crew Member	Television film
