= 2015–16 Nashville Predators season =

Professional ice hockey team season

2015–16 Nashville Predators
- Division: 4th Central
- Conference: 7th Western
- 2015–16 record: 41–27–14
- Home record: 23–11–7
- Road record: 18–16–7
- Goals for: 228
- Goals against: 215

Team information
- General manager: David Poile
- Coach: Peter Laviolette
- Captain: Shea Weber
- Alternate captains: Mike Fisher; Roman Josi; James Neal
- Arena: Bridgestone Arena
- Minor league affiliate: Milwaukee Admirals (AHL)

Team leaders
- Goals: Filip Forsberg (33)
- Assists: Roman Josi (47)
- Points: Filip Forsberg (64)
- Penalty minutes: Barret Jackman (76)
- Plus/minus: James Neal (+27)
- Wins: Pekka Rinne (34)
- Goals against average: Carter Hutton (2.33)

The 2015–16 Nashville Predators season was the 18th season for the National Hockey League (NHL) franchise that was established on June 25, 1997. It was also the first time that the Predators played in a game 7 in a playoff series.

== Schedule and results ==
=== Pre-season ===
2015 Pre-Season game log: 3–2–1 (home: 2–1–1; road: 1–1–0)
| # | Date | Visitor | Score | Home | OT | Decision | Attendance | Record | Recap |
|---|---|---|---|---|---|---|---|---|---|
| 1 | September 20 | Florida | 2–5 | Nashville | | Hutton | 15,432 | 1–0–0 | Recap |
| 2 | September 20 | Florida | 3–2 | Nashville | OT | Saros | 12,711 | 1–0–1 | Recap |
| 3 | September 22 | Nashville | 3–2 | Tampa Bay | OT | Hutton | 14,324 | 2–0–1 | Recap |
| 4 | September 23 | Tampa Bay | 2–5 | Nashville | | Rinne | 14,186 | 3–0–1 | Recap |
| 5 | September 29 | Columbus | 5–2 | Nashville | | Hutton | 16,027 | 3–1–1 | Recap |
| 6 | October 3 | Nashville | 1–7 | Columbus | | Rinne | 13,795 | 3–2–1 | Recap |

=== Regular season ===
2015–16 game log

October: 7–1–2 (home: 4–0–1; road: 3–1–1)
| # | Date | Visitor | Score | Home | OT | Decision | Attendance | Record | Pts | Recap |
|---|---|---|---|---|---|---|---|---|---|---|
| 1 | October 8 | Carolina | 1–2 | Nashville | | Rinne | 17,204 | 1–0–0 | 2 | Recap |
| 2 | October 10 | Edmonton | 0–2 | Nashville | | Rinne | 17,113 | 2–0–0 | 4 | Recap |
| 3 | October 13 | Nashville | 3–1 | New Jersey | | Rinne | 11,117 | 3–0–0 | 6 | Recap |
| 4 | October 15 | Nashville | 3–4 | NY Islanders | | Rinne | 10,542 | 3–1–0 | 6 | Recap |
| 5 | October 17 | Nashville | 4–3 | Ottawa | SO | Hutton | 16,895 | 4–1–0 | 8 | Recap |
| 6 | October 20 | Tampa Bay | 4–5 | Nashville | SO | Rinne | 17,113 | 5–1–0 | 10 | Recap |
| 7 | October 22 | Anaheim | 1–5 | Nashville | | Rinne | 17,113 | 6–1–0 | 12 | Recap |
| 8 | October 24 | Pittsburgh | 2–1 | Nashville | OT | Rinne | 17,163 | 6–1–1 | 13 | Recap |
| 9 | October 28 | Nashville | 2–1 | San Jose | | Rinne | 15,219 | 7–1–1 | 15 | Recap |
| 10 | October 31 | Nashville | 3–4 | Los Angeles | OT | Rinne | 18,230 | 7–1–2 | 16 | Recap |

November: 5–6–2 (home: 3–2–1; road: 2–4–1)
| # | Date | Visitor | Score | Home | OT | Decision | Attendance | Record | Pts | Recap |
|---|---|---|---|---|---|---|---|---|---|---|
| 11 | November 1 | Nashville | 2–4 | Anaheim | | Hutton | 16,276 | 7–2–2 | 16 | Recap |
| 12 | November 5 | Nashville | 3–2 | Minnesota | | Rinne | 19,024 | 8–2–2 | 18 | Recap |
| 13 | November 7 | St. Louis | 4–0 | Nashville | | Rinne | 17,143 | 8–3–2 | 18 | Recap |
| 14 | November 10 | Ottawa | 5–7 | Nashville | | Rinne | 16,963 | 9–3–2 | 20 | Recap |
| 15 | November 12 | Toronto | 2–1 | Nashville | SO | Rinne | 17,231 | 9–3–3 | 21 | Recap |
| 16 | November 14 | Winnipeg | 0–7 | Nashville | | Rinne | 17,113 | 10–3–3 | 23 | Recap |
| 17 | November 17 | Anaheim | 2–3 | Nashville | | Rinne | 17,113 | 11–3–3 | 25 | Recap |
| 18 | November 20 | Nashville | 0–4 | Columbus | | Rinne | 13,584 | 11–4–3 | 25 | Recap |
| 19 | November 21 | Nashville | 0–4 | Minnesota | | Rinne | 19,056 | 11–5–3 | 25 | Recap |
| 20 | November 23 | Nashville | 0–3 | NY Rangers | | Rinne | 18,006 | 11–6–3 | 25 | Recap |
| 21 | November 25 | Nashville | 3–2 | Buffalo | | Hutton | 17,871 | 12–6–3 | 27 | Recap |
| 22 | November 27 | Nashville | 2–3 | Philadelphia | OT | Rinne | 19,818 | 12–6–4 | 28 | Recap |
| 23 | November 28 | Buffalo | 4–1 | Nashville | | Saros | 17,217 | 12–7–4 | 28 | Recap |

December: 6–6–3 (home: 5–3–1; road: 1–3–2)
| # | Date | Visitor | Score | Home | OT | Decision | Attendance | Record | Pts | Recap |
|---|---|---|---|---|---|---|---|---|---|---|
| 24 | December 1 | Arizona | 2–5 | Nashville | | Rinne | 15,091 | 13–7–4 | 30 | Recap |
| 25 | December 3 | Florida | 2–1 | Nashville | | Rinne | 15,405 | 13–8–4 | 30 | Recap |
| 26 | December 5 | Nashville | 4–5 | Detroit | OT | Rinne | 20,027 | 13–8–5 | 31 | Recap |
| 27 | December 7 | Nashville | 3–2 | Boston | | Hutton | 17,565 | 14–8–5 | 33 | Recap |
| 28 | December 8 | Nashville | 1–4 | Chicago | | Rinne | 21,432 | 14–9–5 | 33 | Recap |
| 29 | December 10 | Chicago | 1–5 | Nashville | | Rinne | 17,113 | 15–9–5 | 35 | Recap |
| 30 | December 12 | Colorado | 3–2 | Nashville | | Rinne | 17,113 | 15–10–5 | 35 | Recap |
| 31 | December 15 | Calgary | 2–1 | Nashville | OT | Rinne | 15,431 | 15–10–6 | 36 | Recap |
| 32 | December 17 | Nashville | 1–2 | St. Louis | | Rinne | 17,882 | 15–11–6 | 36 | Recap |
| 33 | December 19 | Minnesota | 2–3 | Nashville | | Rinne | 17,117 | 16–11–6 | 38 | Recap |
| 34 | December 21 | Montreal | 1–5 | Nashville | | Rinne | 17,113 | 17–11–6 | 40 | Recap |
| 35 | December 26 | Detroit | 3–2 | Nashville | | Rinne | 17,208 | 17–12–6 | 40 | Recap |
| 36 | December 28 | NY Rangers | 3–5 | Nashville | | Rinne | 17,317 | 18–12–6 | 42 | Recap |
| 37 | December 29 | Nashville | 3–4 | St. Louis | OT | Hutton | 19,319 | 18–12–7 | 43 | Recap |
| 38 | December 31 | Nashville | 1–5 | Dallas | | Rinne | 18,532 | 18–13–7 | 43 | Recap |

January: 6–5–1 (home: 1–2–0; road: 5–3–1)
| # | Date | Visitor | Score | Home | OT | Decision | Attendance | Record | Pts | Recap |
|---|---|---|---|---|---|---|---|---|---|---|
| 39 | January 2 | Nashville | 2–1 | Carolina | OT | Rinne | 12,149 | 19–13–7 | 45 | Recap |
| 40 | January 5 | Winnipeg | 4–1 | Nashville | | Rinne | 17,113 | 19–14–7 | 45 | Recap |
| 41 | January 8 | Nashville | 3–5 | Colorado | | Rinne | 17,680 | 19–15–7 | 45 | Recap |
| 42 | January 9 | Nashville | 0–4 | Arizona | | Hutton | 12,345 | 19–16–7 | 45 | Recap |
| 43 | January 12 | Nashville | 2–3 | Chicago | | Rinne | 21,618 | 19–17–7 | 45 | Recap |
| 44 | January 14 | Nashville | 4–5 | Winnipeg | OT | Rinne | 15,294 | 19–17–8 | 46 | Recap |
| 45 | January 16 | Minnesota | 0–3 | Nashville | | Hutton | 17,302 | 20–17–8 | 48 | Recap |
| 46 | January 19 | Chicago | 4–1 | Nashville | | Rinne | 17,122 | 20–18–8 | 48 | Recap |
| 47 | January 21 | Nashville | 4–1 | Winnipeg | | Rinne | 15,294 | 21–18–8 | 50 | Recap |
| 48 | January 23 | Nashville | 4–1 | Edmonton | | Rinne | 16,839 | 22–18–8 | 52 | Recap |
| 49 | January 26 | Nashville | 2–1 | Vancouver | | Rinne | 18,570 | 23–18–8 | 54 | Recap |
| 50 | January 27 | Nashville | 2–1 | Calgary | | Hutton | 19,289 | 24–18–8 | 56 | Recap |

February: 7–3–3 (home: 3–3–2; road: 4–0–1)
| # | Date | Visitor | Score | Home | OT | Decision | Attendance | Record | Pts | Recap |
|---|---|---|---|---|---|---|---|---|---|---|
| 51 | February 2 | St. Louis | 1–0 | Nashville | | Rinne | 16,045 | 24–19–8 | 56 | Recap |
| 52 | February 4 | Philadelphia | 6–3 | Nashville | | Rinne | 17,113 | 24–20–8 | 56 | Recap |
| 53 | February 6 | San Jose | 2–6 | Nashville | | Rinne | 17,192 | 25–20–8 | 58 | Recap |
| 54 | February 9 | Washington | 5–3 | Nashville | | Rinne | 17,113 | 25–21–8 | 58 | Recap |
| 55 | February 12 | Nashville | 3–4 | Tampa Bay | OT | Rinne | 19,092 | 25–21–9 | 59 | Recap |
| 56 | February 13 | Nashville | 5–0 | Florida | | Hutton | 13,019 | 26–21–9 | 61 | Recap |
| 57 | February 15 | Dallas | 3–2 | Nashville | OT | Hutton | 17,113 | 26–21–10 | 62 | Recap |
| 58 | February 18 | Boston | 0–2 | Nashville | | Rinne | 17,113 | 27–21–10 | 64 | Recap |
| 59 | February 20 | Los Angeles | 2–1 | Nashville | OT | Rinne | 17,369 | 27–21–11 | 65 | Recap |
| 60 | February 22 | Nashville | 2–1 | Montreal | SO | Rinne | 21,288 | 28–21–11 | 67 | Recap |
| 61 | February 23 | Nashville | 3–2 | Toronto | | Hutton | 18,844 | 29–21–11 | 69 | Recap |
| 62 | February 25 | Nashville | 3–1 | Chicago | | Rinne | 22,058 | 30–21–11 | 71 | Recap |
| 63 | February 27 | St. Louis | 0–5 | Nashville | | Rinne | 17,379 | 31–21–11 | 73 | Recap |

March: 8–5–2 (home: 5–1–1; road: 3–4–1)
| # | Date | Visitor | Score | Home | OT | Decision | Attendance | Record | Pts | Recap |
|---|---|---|---|---|---|---|---|---|---|---|
| 64 | March 1 | Dallas | 3–5 | Nashville | | Rinne | 17,113 | 32–21–11 | 75 | Recap |
| 65 | March 3 | New Jersey | 5–4 | Nashville | OT | Rinne | 17,113 | 32–21–12 | 76 | Recap |
| 66 | March 5 | Nashville | 5–2 | Colorado | | Rinne | 17,165 | 33–21–12 | 78 | Recap |
| 67 | March 8 | Nashville | 4–2 | Winnipeg | | Rinne | 15,294 | 34–21–12 | 80 | Recap |
| 68 | March 9 | Nashville | 2–3 | Calgary | OT | Hutton | 19,289 | 34–21–13 | 81 | Recap |
| 69 | March 12 | Nashville | 2–4 | Vancouver | | Rinne | 18,898 | 34–22–13 | 81 | Recap |
| 70 | March 14 | Nashville | 3–2 | Edmonton | | Rinne | 16,839 | 35–22–13 | 83 | Recap |
| 71 | March 17 | NY Islanders | 2–4 | Nashville | | Rinne | 17,113 | 36–22–13 | 85 | Recap |
| 72 | March 18 | Nashville | 1–4 | Washington | | Hutton | 18,506 | 36–23–13 | 85 | Recap |
| 73 | March 21 | Los Angeles | 2–5 | Nashville | | Rinne | 17,113 | 37–23–13 | 87 | Recap |
| 74 | March 24 | Vancouver | 2–3 | Nashville | SO | Rinne | 17,113 | 38–23–13 | 89 | Recap |
| 75 | March 26 | Columbus | 1–5 | Nashville | | Rinne | 17,113 | 39–23–13 | 91 | Recap |
| 76 | March 28 | Colorado | 4–3 | Nashville | | Hutton | 16,443 | 39–24–13 | 91 | Recap |
| 77 | March 29 | Nashville | 2–5 | Dallas | | Rinne | 18,265 | 39–25–13 | 91 | Recap |
| 78 | March 31 | Nashville | 2–5 | Pittsburgh | | Rinne | 18,560 | 39–26–13 | 91 | Recap |

April: 2–1–1 (home: 2–0–1; road: 0–1–0)
| # | Date | Visitor | Score | Home | OT | Decision | Attendance | Record | Pts | Recap |
|---|---|---|---|---|---|---|---|---|---|---|
| 79 | April 2 | San Jose | 3–2 | Nashville | SO | Hutton | 17,113 | 39–26–14 | 92 | Recap |
| 80 | April 5 | Colorado | 3–4 | Nashville | | Rinne | 17,113 | 40–26–14 | 94 | Recap |
| 81 | April 7 | Arizona | 2–3 | Nashville | OT | Rinne | 17,113 | 41–26–14 | 96 | Recap |
| 82 | April 9 | Nashville | 2–3 | Dallas | | Hutton | 18,532 | 41–27–14 | 96 | Recap |

Legend: Win (2 points) Loss (0 points) Overtime/shootout loss (1 point)

=== Playoffs ===
==== Summary ====
===== First round: Anaheim =====
After trailing 2–1 in the second period, the Predators opened their playoff run with a 3–2 victory over the Ducks. The Predators took a 2–0 lead in the series with a 3–2 victory over the Ducks. Back home in Nashville for Game 3, the Predators were shut out in a 3–0 loss and the Ducks pushed the series to 2–1. The Ducks evened the series in a 4–1 victory in Game 4. The Ducks pulled to a one-game lead over the Predators with a 5–2 victory in Game 5. Back in Nashville for Game 6, the Predators kept the series alive with a 3–1 victory over the Ducks. The Predators scored two goals in the first period and held off a late rally by the Ducks to win Game 7 2–1 and advance on to the Western Conference semifinals.

===== Second round: San Jose =====
Despite scoring the first goal, the Predators fell 5–2 to the Sharks in Game 1 of the second round. The Predators fell to a two-game deficit in a 3–2 loss to the Sharks in Game 2. After allowing a power play goal in the first period, the Predators scored four unanswered goals – including two on power plays – to take Game 3. A third overtime goal by Mike Fisher gave the Predators a 4–3 victory in Game 4 and evened the series at two games a piece. The Predators fell 5–1 to the Sharks in Game 5. Despite trailing two goals in the first period of Game 6, the Predators rallied back to tie the game in the third period and score the winning goal in overtime to force a Game 7, which they lost 5–0.

==== Results ====
2016 Stanley Cup playoffs

Western Conference first round vs. (P1) Anaheim Ducks: Nashville wins 4–3
| # | Date | Visitor | Score | Home | OT | Decision | Attendance | Series | Recap |
|---|---|---|---|---|---|---|---|---|---|
| 1 | April 15 | Nashville | 3–2 | Anaheim | | Rinne | 17,236 | 1–0 | Recap |
| 2 | April 17 | Nashville | 3–2 | Anaheim | | Rinne | 17,174 | 2–0 | Recap |
| 3 | April 19 | Anaheim | 3–0 | Nashville | | Rinne | 17,204 | 2–1 | Recap |
| 4 | April 21 | Anaheim | 4–1 | Nashville | | Rinne | 17,232 | 2–2 | Recap |
| 5 | April 23 | Nashville | 2–5 | Anaheim | | Rinne | 17,360 | 2–3 | Recap |
| 6 | April 25 | Anaheim | 1–3 | Nashville | | Rinne | 17,113 | 3–3 | Recap |
| 7 | April 27 | Nashville | 2–1 | Anaheim | | Rinne | 17,407 | 4–3 | Recap |

Western Conference second round vs. (P3) San Jose Sharks: San Jose wins 4–3
| # | Date | Visitor | Score | Home | OT | Decision | Attendance | Series | Recap |
|---|---|---|---|---|---|---|---|---|---|
| 1 | April 29 | Nashville | 2–5 | San Jose | | Rinne | 17,026 | 0–1 | Recap |
| 2 | May 1 | Nashville | 2–3 | San Jose | | Rinne | 17,562 | 0–2 | Recap |
| 3 | May 3 | San Jose | 1–4 | Nashville | | Rinne | 17,163 | 1–2 | Recap |
| 4 | May 5 | San Jose | 3–4 | Nashville | 3OT | Rinne | 17,188 | 2–2 | Recap |
| 5 | May 7 | Nashville | 1–5 | San Jose | | Rinne | 17,562 | 2–3 | Recap |
| 6 | May 9 | San Jose | 3–4 | Nashville | OT | Rinne | 17,292 | 3–3 | Recap |
| 7 | May 12 | Nashville | 0–5 | San Jose | | Rinne | 17,562 | 3–4 | Recap |

Legend: Win Loss

== Player stats ==
Final stats

=== Skaters ===
Regular season
| Player | GP | G | A | Pts | +/− | PIM |
|---|---|---|---|---|---|---|
| Filip Forsberg | 82 | 33 | 31 | 64 | 1 | 47 |
| Roman Josi | 81 | 14 | 47 | 61 | −3 | 43 |
| James Neal | 82 | 31 | 27 | 58 | 27 | 65 |
| Shea Weber | 78 | 20 | 31 | 51 | −7 | 27 |
| Mike Ribeiro | 81 | 7 | 43 | 50 | 11 | 62 |
| Craig Smith | 82 | 21 | 16 | 37 | 4 | 40 |
| Mattias Ekholm | 82 | 8 | 27 | 35 | 14 | 44 |
| Ryan Johansen^{†} | 42 | 8 | 26 | 34 | 10 | 36 |
| Ryan Ellis | 79 | 10 | 22 | 32 | 13 | 35 |
| Calle Jarnkrok | 81 | 16 | 14 | 30 | 1 | 14 |
| Colin Wilson | 64 | 6 | 18 | 24 | −1 | 14 |
| Mike Fisher | 70 | 13 | 10 | 23 | −14 | 29 |
| Viktor Arvidsson | 56 | 8 | 8 | 16 | −8 | 35 |
| Seth Jones^{‡} | 40 | 1 | 10 | 11 | −5 | 10 |
| Miikka Salomaki | 61 | 5 | 5 | 10 | −1 | 28 |
| Austin Watson | 57 | 3 | 7 | 10 | −4 | 32 |
| Cody Hodgson | 39 | 3 | 5 | 8 | 2 | 6 |
| Eric Nystrom | 46 | 7 | 0 | 7 | −6 | 20 |
| Colton Sissons | 34 | 4 | 2 | 6 | 5 | 12 |
| Paul Gaustad | 63 | 2 | 4 | 6 | −4 | 46 |
| Anthony Bitetto | 28 | 1 | 5 | 6 | 0 | 19 |
| Barret Jackman | 73 | 1 | 4 | 5 | 1 | 76 |
| Gabriel Bourque | 22 | 1 | 3 | 4 | 0 | 18 |
| Petter Granberg | 27 | 0 | 2 | 2 | 1 | 13 |
| Kevin Fiala | 5 | 1 | 0 | 1 | 0 | 0 |
| Cody Bass | 17 | 0 | 0 | 0 | −1 | 17 |
| Victor Bartley^{‡} | 1 | 0 | 0 | 0 | −1 | 0 |
| Stefan Elliott^{†} | 2 | 0 | 0 | 0 | −1 | 0 |
| Corey Potter | 1 | 0 | 0 | 0 | 0 | 0 |

Playoffs
| Player | GP | G | A | Pts | +/− | PIM |
|---|---|---|---|---|---|---|
| Colin Wilson | 14 | 5 | 8 | 13 | 8 | 0 |
| Roman Josi | 14 | 1 | 8 | 9 | −6 | 12 |
| James Neal | 14 | 4 | 4 | 8 | 1 | 8 |
| Ryan Johansen | 14 | 4 | 4 | 8 | 0 | 16 |
| Mike Fisher | 14 | 5 | 2 | 7 | −1 | 2 |
| Shea Weber | 14 | 3 | 4 | 7 | −7 | 18 |
| Mattias Ekholm | 14 | 3 | 4 | 7 | 2 | 4 |
| Ryan Ellis | 14 | 0 | 6 | 6 | 0 | 4 |
| Filip Forsberg | 14 | 2 | 2 | 4 | −11 | 2 |
| Craig Smith | 11 | 1 | 1 | 2 | 1 | 4 |
| Miikka Salomaki | 14 | 1 | 1 | 2 | 2 | 6 |
| Viktor Arvidsson | 14 | 1 | 1 | 2 | −3 | 8 |
| Mike Ribeiro | 12 | 0 | 2 | 2 | −3 | 16 |
| Paul Gaustad | 14 | 1 | 0 | 1 | 0 | 0 |
| Calle Jarnkrok | 14 | 0 | 1 | 1 | −5 | 4 |
| Barret Jackman | 14 | 0 | 0 | 0 | 1 | 22 |
| Eric Nystrom | 1 | 0 | 0 | 0 | 0 | 2 |
| Cody Bass | 6 | 0 | 0 | 0 | −2 | 2 |
| Anthony Bitetto | 14 | 0 | 0 | 0 | 1 | 6 |
| Pontus Aberg | 2 | 0 | 0 | 0 | 0 | 0 |
| Colton Sissons | 10 | 0 | 0 | 0 | −1 | 8 |

=== Goaltenders ===
Regular season
| Player | GP | GS | TOI | W | L | OT | GA | GAA | SA | SV% | SO | G | A | PIM |
|---|---|---|---|---|---|---|---|---|---|---|---|---|---|---|
| Pekka Rinne | 66 | 66 | 3895:22 | 34 | 21 | 10 | 161 | 2.48 | 1744 | .908 | 4 | 0 | 2 | 6 |
| Carter Hutton | 17 | 15 | 978:56 | 7 | 5 | 4 | 38 | 2.33 | 464 | .918 | 2 | 0 | 1 | 0 |
| Juuse Saros | 1 | 1 | 58:01 | 0 | 1 | 0 | 3 | 3.10 | 23 | .870 | 0 | 0 | 0 | 0 |

Playoffs
| Player | GP | GS | TOI | W | L | GA | GAA | SA | SV% | SO | G | A | PIM |
|---|---|---|---|---|---|---|---|---|---|---|---|---|---|
| Pekka Rinne | 14 | 14 | 866 | 7 | 7 | 38 | 2.63 | 404 | .906 | 0 | 0 | 1 | 0 |
| Carter Hutton | 3 | 0 | 20 | 0 | 0 | 1 | 3.00 | 3 | .667 | 0 | 0 | 0 | 0 |

^{†}Denotes player spent time with another team before joining the Predators. Stats reflect time with the Predators only.
^{‡}Traded mid-season. Stats reflect time with the Predators only.
Bold/italics denotes franchise record

== Awards and honours ==
=== Awards ===
Regular season
| Player | Award | Awarded |
|---|---|---|
| S. Weber | NHL Second Star of the Week | December 7, 2015 |
| S. Weber | NHL All-Star game selection | January 6, 2016 |
| R. Josi | NHL All-Star game selection | January 6, 2016 |
| P. Rinne | NHL All-Star game selection | January 6, 2016 |
| J. Neal | NHL All-Star game replacement selection | January 28, 2016 |

=== Milestones ===
Regular season
| Player | Milestone | Reached |
|---|---|---|
| V. Arvidsson | 1st Career NHL Goal; 1st Career NHL Point | October 8, 2015 |
| C. Hodgson | 300th Career NHL Game | November 1, 2015 |
| S. Weber | 400th Career NHL Point | November 10, 2015 |
| S. Weber | 700th Career NHL Game | November 12, 2015 |
| C. Jarnkrok | 100th Career NHL Game | November 12, 2015 |
| R. Josi | 100th Career NHL Assist | November 17, 2015 |
| J. Neal | 500th Career NHL Game | November 23, 2015 |
| P. Rinne | 400th Career NHL Game | November 27, 2015 |
| C. Smith | 300th Career NHL Game | November 28, 2015 |

== Transactions ==
The Predators have been involved in the following transactions during the 2015–16 season.

=== Trades ===
| Date | Details | | Ref |
| July 1, 2015 | To Calgary Flames Conditional 4th-round pick in 2016 | To Nashville Predators Max Reinhart |
| July 1, 2015 | To New York Rangers Magnus Hellberg | To Nashville Predators 6th-round pick in 2017 |
| July 12, 2015 | To Toronto Maple Leafs Taylor Beck | To Nashville Predators Jamie Devane |
| January 6, 2016 | To Columbus Blue Jackets Seth Jones | To Nashville Predators Ryan Johansen |
| January 14, 2016 | To Ottawa Senators Conor Allen | To Nashville Predators Patrick Mullen |
| January 15, 2016 | To Arizona Coyotes Victor Bartley | To Nashville Predators Stefan Elliott |
| February 29, 2016 | To Arizona Coyotes Future considerations | To Nashville Predators Corey Potter |
| June 20, 2016 | To Buffalo Sabres Jimmy Vesey (rights) | To Nashville Predators MIN's 3rd-round pick in 2016 |

=== Free agents acquired ===
| Date | Player | Former team | Contract terms (in U.S. dollars) | Ref |
| July 1, 2015 | Barret Jackman | St. Louis Blues | 2 year, $4 million | |
| July 1, 2015 | Cody Hodgson | Buffalo Sabres | 1 year, $1.05 million | |
| July 2, 2015 | Conor Allen | New York Rangers | 1 year, $575,000 | |
| July 4, 2015 | Cody Bass | Rockford IceHogs | 1 year, $575,000 | |
| January 5, 2016 | Frederick Gaudreau | Milwaukee Admirals | 2 years, entry-level contract | |
| April 21, 2016 | Adam Payerl | Milwaukee Admirals | 1 year, $575,000 | |
| June 1, 2016 | Jonas Gunnarsson | Malmo Redhawks | 1 year, entry-level contract | |

=== Free agents lost ===
| Date | Player | New team | Contract terms (in U.S. dollars) | Ref |
| July 1, 2015 | Viktor Stalberg | New York Rangers | 1 year, $1.1 million | |
| July 1, 2015 | Joe Piskula | Anaheim Ducks | 1 year, $600,000 | |
| August 6, 2015 | Matt Cullen | Pittsburgh Penguins | 1 year, $800,000 | |
| August 17, 2015 | Mike Santorelli | Anaheim Ducks | 1 year, $875,000 | |
| September 10, 2015 | Cody Franson | Buffalo Sabres | 2 years, $6.65 million | |

=== Claimed via waivers ===
| Player | Previous team | Date |
|---|---|---|
| Petter Granberg | Toronto Maple Leafs | November 22, 2015 |

=== Lost via waivers ===
| Player | New team | Date |

=== Player signings ===
| Date | Player | Contract terms (in U.S. dollars) | Ref |
| June 26, 2015 | Mike Fisher | 2 years, $8.8 million | |
| June 29, 2015 | Austin Watson | 2 years, $1.15 million | |
| July 1, 2015 | Mike Ribeiro | 2 years, $7 million | |
| July 2, 2015 | Gabriel Bourque | 1 year, $866,250 | |
| July 2, 2015 | Max Reinhart | 1 year, $575,000 | |
| July 10, 2015 | Vladislav Kamenev | 3 years, entry-level contract | |
| July 10, 2015 | Yakov Trenin | 3 years, entry-level contract | |
| July 13, 2015 | Anthony Bitetto | 1 year, $665,500 | |
| July 16, 2015 | Taylor Aronson | 1 year, $605,000 | |
| July 17, 2015 | Calle Jarnkrok | 1 year, $735,000 | |
| July 20, 2015 | Craig Smith | 5 years, $21.25 million | |
| July 24, 2015 | Jack Dougherty | 3 years, entry-level contract | |
| July 27, 2015 | Colin Wilson | 4 years, $15.75 million | |
| October 26, 2015 | Mattias Ekholm | 6 years, $22.5 million contract extension | |
| November 12, 2015 | Alexandre Carrier | 3 years, entry-level contract | |
| February 22, 2016 | Colton Sissons | 3 years, $1.875 million contract extension | |
| February 26, 2016 | Anthony Bitetto | 2 years, $1.225 million contract extension | |
| March 1, 2016 | Miikka Salomaki | 2 years, $1.225 million contract extension | |
| May 16, 2016 | Justin Kirkland | 3 years, entry-level contract | |
| June 1, 2016 | Cody Bass | 2 years, $1.225 million contract extension | |
| June 13, 2016 | Marek Mazanec | 1 year, $575,000 | |

== Draft picks ==
Below are the Nashville Predators' selections at the 2015 NHL entry draft, that was held on June 26–27, 2015 at the BB&T Center in Sunrise, Florida.

| Round | # | Player | Pos | Nationality | College/Junior/Club team (League) |
|---|---|---|---|---|---|
| 2 | 55 | Iakov Trenin | C | Russia | Gatineau Olympiques (QMJHL) |
| 3 | 85 | Thomas Novak | C | United States | Waterloo Black Hawks (USHL) |
| 4 | 100^{[a]} | Anthony Richards | C | Canada | Val-d'Or Foreurs (QMJHL) |
| 4 | 115 | Alexandre Carrier | D | Canada | Gatineau Olympiques (QMJHL) |
| 5 | 145 | Karel Vejmelka | G | Czech Republic | HC Dynamo Pardubice (Czech U20) |
| 6 | 175 | Tyler Moy | C | Canada | Harvard University (NCAA) |
| 7 | 205 | Evan Smith | G | United States | Austin Bruins (NAHL) |

=== Draft notes ===
- The Nashville Predators' first-round pick was traded to the Toronto Maple Leafs (later sent Philadelphia) as the result of a trade on February 15, 2015, that sent Cody Franson and Mike Santorelli to Nashville in exchange for Olli Jokinen, Brendan Leipsic and this pick.
- ^{a} The San Jose Sharks' fourth-round pick went to the Nashville Predators as the result of a trade on June 28, 2014, that sent Detroit's second-round pick in 2014 to San Jose in exchange for a second-round pick in 2014 and this pick.
