= Stephen Johns (ice hockey) =

American ice hockey player (born 1992)

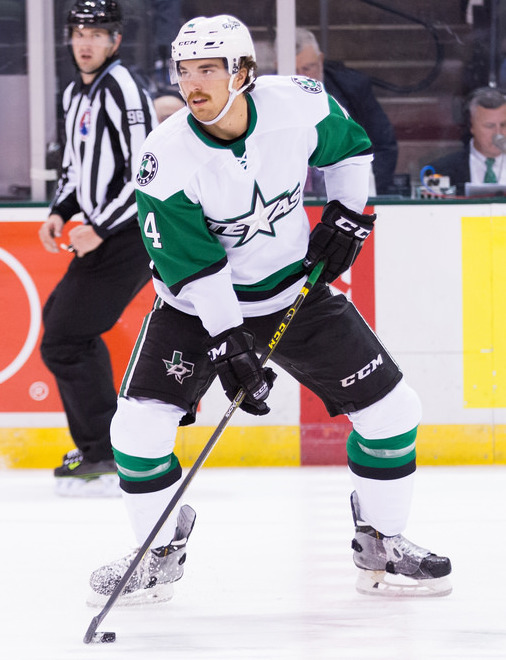
- Johns with the Texas Stars in 2015
- Born: April 18, 1992 (age 34) Ellwood City, Pennsylvania, U.S.
- Height: 6 ft 4 in (193 cm)
- Weight: 234 lb (106 kg; 16 st 10 lb)
- Position: Defense
- Shot: Right
- Played for: Dallas Stars
- NHL draft: 60th overall, 2010; Chicago Blackhawks
- Playing career: 2014–2020

Stephen Johns (born April 18, 1992) is an American former professional ice hockey defenseman. He played with the Dallas Stars of the National Hockey League (NHL). Johns was selected by the Chicago Blackhawks in the 2nd round (60th overall) of the 2010 NHL entry draft.

== Playing career ==
As a youth, Johns played in the 2005 Quebec International Pee-Wee Hockey Tournament with the Pittsburgh Hornets minor ice hockey team.

As a junior, Johns played the 2009–10 season with the USA Hockey National Team Development Program. He was a member of the gold-medal-winning team at the 2010 IIHF World U18 Championships.

Johns then played four seasons (2010–2014) of NCAA Division I hockey with the Notre Dame Fighting Irish men's ice hockey team, helping Notre Dame to win the 2013 CCHA Men's Ice Hockey Tournament. As a sophomore Johns was selected to compete with Team USA at the 2012 World Junior Ice Hockey Championships, and in his senior year his outstanding play was recognized when he was named to the Hockey East Second All-Star Team and also to the 2014 Hockey East All Tournament Team.

On April 2, 2014, the Chicago Blackhawks of the National Hockey League (NHL) signed Johns to a two-year, entry-level contract to begin with the 2014–15 NHL season, but he was immediately assigned to begin his professional career with the Blackhawks' AHL affiliate, the Rockford IceHogs on a professional try-out contract.

On July 10, 2015, Johns and Patrick Sharp were traded by the Blackhawks to the Dallas Stars in exchange for Trevor Daley and Ryan Garbutt. After attending his first training camp with the Stars, Johns was reassigned to their AHL affiliate, the Texas Stars, to begin the 2015–16 season. Having passed his previous season's offensive numbers, he received his first NHL recall by the Dallas Stars and made his debut in a 5–2 victory over the Chicago Blackhawks on March 12, 2016. He recorded his first career NHL goal on March 17, 2016 and the following day signed a two-year contract with the Stars.

On January 18, 2020 Johns played his first game since returning from a post-traumatic headache he suffered during the 2017–18 season, in a Stars defeat against the Minnesota Wild, and on February 3, he scored his first goal in nearly 2 years in a victory against the New York Rangers. In 17 regular season games, Johns added 2 goals and 5 points before the season was paused due to the COVID-19 pandemic. He returned to for the playoffs with the Stars, making 4 appearances as the club reached the 2020 Stanley Cup Finals.

Prior to the pandemic delayed 2020–21 season, Johns was announced to be a non-rostered designated player at the Stars commencement of training camp. He was ruled out for the entirety of the season with reoccurring post-concussion syndrome.

With his contract concluded with the Dallas Stars, Johns announced his retirement from the NHL having played 6 professional seasons on June 13, 2021. While posting his retirement on Instagram, he announced would be rollerblading and road-tripping across the country in order to raise awareness of mental health.

== Career statistics ==
=== Regular season and playoffs ===
			Regular season					Playoffs
Season	Team	League	GP	G	A	Pts	PIM	GP	G	A	Pts	PIM
2008–09	U.S. NTDP U17	USDP	16	2	6	8	20	—	—	—	—	—
2008–09	U.S. NTDP U18	NAHL	31	3	5	8	30	—	—	—	—	—
2009–10	U.S. NTDP U18	USDP	62	3	16	19	67	—	—	—	—	—
2009–10	U.S. NTDP Juniors	USHL	23	1	7	8	29	—	—	—	—	—
2010–11	Notre Dame Fighting Irish	CCHA	44	2	11	13	98	—	—	—	—	—
2011–12	Notre Dame Fighting Irish	CCHA	39	4	6	10	71	—	—	—	—	—
2012–13	Notre Dame Fighting Irish	CCHA	41	1	13	14	62	—	—	—	—	—
2013–14	Notre Dame Fighting Irish	HE	40	8	12	20	69	—	—	—	—	—
2013–14	Rockford IceHogs	AHL	8	1	4	5	4	—	—	—	—	—
2014–15	Rockford IceHogs	AHL	51	4	17	21	44	8	3	4	7	4
2015–16	Texas Stars	AHL	55	4	20	24	43	—	—	—	—	—
2015–16	Dallas Stars	NHL	14	1	2	3	6	13	0	0	0	6
2016–17	Dallas Stars	NHL	61	4	6	10	36	—	—	—	—	—
2016–17	Texas Stars	AHL	2	3	0	3	0	—	—	—	—	—
2017–18	Dallas Stars	NHL	75	8	7	15	41	—	—	—	—	—
2019–20	Texas Stars	AHL	2	1	3	4	4	—	—	—	—	—
2019–20	Dallas Stars	NHL	17	2	3	5	10	4	0	0	0	0
NHL totals			167	15	18	33	93	17	0	0	0	6

=== International ===
Year	Team	Event	Result	GP	G	A	Pts	PIM
2009	United States	U17	3rd place, bronze medalist(s)	6	1	3	4	14
2010	United States	WJC18	1st place, gold medalist(s)	7	0	3	3	10
2012	United States	WJC	7th	6	1	1	2	2
Junior totals				19	2	7	9	26

== Awards and honors ==
Award	Year
IIHF World U18 Championship Gold Medal (Team USA)	2010
CCHA Men's Ice Hockey Tournament Champion	2013
CCHA All-Tournament Team	2013
Hockey East Second All-Star Team	2014
Hockey East All-Tournament Team	2014
