= 2015–16 Winnipeg Jets season =

National Hockey League team season

2015–16 Winnipeg Jets
- Division: 7th Central
- Conference: 11th Western
- 2015–16 record: 35–39–8
- Home record: 18–19–4
- Road record: 17–20–4
- Goals for: 215
- Goals against: 239

Team information
- General manager: Kevin Cheveldayoff
- Coach: Paul Maurice
- Captain: Andrew Ladd (Oct.–Feb.); Vacant (Feb.–Apr.)
- Alternate captains: Mark Stuart; Blake Wheeler
- Arena: MTS Centre
- Average attendance: 15,294 (101.9%)
- Minor league affiliates: Manitoba Moose (AHL); Tulsa Oilers (ECHL)

Team leaders
- Goals: Mark Scheifele (29)
- Assists: Blake Wheeler (52)
- Points: Blake Wheeler (78)
- Penalty minutes: Dustin Byfuglien (119)
- Plus/minus: Mark Scheifele (+16)
- Wins: Connor Hellebuyck and Ondřej Pavelec (13)
- Goals against average: Connor Hellebuyck (2.34)

The 2015–16 Winnipeg Jets season was the 33rd season of play for the National Hockey League (NHL) franchise that was established on June 22, 1979, and 41st season for the organization overall.

== Schedule and results ==
=== Pre-season ===
2015 preseason game log: 3–2–2 (Home: 2–0–2; Road: 1–2–0)
#	Date	Visitor	Score	Home	OT	Decision	Attendance	Record	Recap
1	September 22	Minnesota	1–0	Winnipeg	OT	Hellebuyck	15,294	0–0–1	Recap
2	September 23	Winnipeg	2–3	Edmonton		Comrie	16,839	0–1–1	Recap
3	September 25	Edmonton	4–3	Winnipeg	OT	Pavelec	15,294	0–1–2	Recap
4	September 27	Winnipeg	1–8	Minnesota		Hutchinson	17,710	0–2–2	Recap
5	September 29	Ottawa	3–4	Winnipeg	OT	Pavelec	15,294	1–2–2	Recap
6	October 1	Calgary	1–3	Winnipeg		Hutchinson	15,294	2–2–2	Recap
7	October 3	Winnipeg	3–2	Calgary		Pavelec	19,289	3–2–2	Recap

=== Regular season ===
2015–16 game log

October: 7–3–1 (Home: 3–2–1; Road: 4–1–0)
#	Date	Visitor	Score	Home	OT	Decision	Attendance	Record	Pts	Recap
1	October 8	Winnipeg	6–2	Boston		Pavelec	17,565	1–0–0	2	Recap
2	October 9	Winnipeg	3–1	New Jersey		Hutchinson	14,579	2–0–0	4	Recap
3	October 12	Winnipeg	2–4	NY Islanders		Pavelec	11,183	2–1–0	4	Recap
4	October 13	Winnipeg	4–1	NY Rangers		Hutchinson	18,006	3–1–0	6	Recap
5	October 16	Calgary	1–3	Winnipeg		Pavelec	15,294	4–1–0	8	Recap
6	October 18	St. Louis	4–2	Winnipeg		Pavelec	15,294	4–2–0	8	Recap
7	October 23	Tampa Bay	4–3	Winnipeg	OT	Pavelec	15,294	4–2–1	9	Recap
8	October 25	Minnesota	4–5	Winnipeg		Hutchinson	15,294	5–2–1	11	Recap
9	October 27	Los Angeles	4–1	Winnipeg		Pavelec	15,294	5–3–1	11	Recap
10	October 29	Chicago	1–3	Winnipeg		Hutchinson	15,294	6–3–1	13	Recap
11	October 31	Winnipeg	3–2	Columbus		Pavelec	12,860	7–3–1	15	Recap

November: 4–9–1 (Home: 2–2–0; Road: 2–7–1)
#	Date	Visitor	Score	Home	OT	Decision	Attendance	Record	Pts	Recap
12	November 1	Winnipeg	1–5	Montreal		Hutchinson	21,288	7–4–1	15	Recap
13	November 4	Winnipeg	4–2	Toronto		Pavelec	19,113	8–4–1	17	Recap
14	November 5	Winnipeg	2–3	Ottawa	SO	Hutchinson	17,195	8–4–2	18	Recap
15	November 7	Philadelphia	3–0	Winnipeg		Pavelec	15,294	8–5–2	18	Recap
16	November 10	Winnipeg	3–5	Minnesota		Pavelec	19,153	8–6–2	18	Recap
17	November 12	Winnipeg	3–6	Dallas		Pavelec	18,010	8–7–2	18	Recap
18	November 14	Winnipeg	0–7	Nashville		Hutchinson	17,113	8–8–2	18	Recap
19	November 16	Winnipeg	2–3	St. Louis		Hutchinson	18,680	8–9–2	18	Recap
20	November 18	Vancouver	1–4	Winnipeg		Pavelec	15,294	9–9–2	20	Recap
21	November 21	Arizona	2–3	Winnipeg		Hutchinson	15,294	10–9–2	22	Recap
22	November 23	Colorado	4–1	Winnipeg		Hutchinson	15,294	10–10–2	22	Recap
23	November 25	Winnipeg	3–5	Washington		Hutchinson	18,506	10–11–2	22	Recap
24	November 27	Winnipeg	3–1	Minnesota		Hellebuyck	19,055	11–11–2	24	Recap
25	November 28	Winnipeg	3–5	Colorado		Hutchinson	16,311	11–12–2	24	Recap

December: 6–6–0 (Home: 6–1–0; Road: 0–5–0)
#	Date	Visitor	Score	Home	OT	Decision	Attendance	Record	Pts	Recap
26	December 2	Toronto	1–6	Winnipeg		Hellebuyck	15,294	12–12–2	26	Recap
27	December 5	Washington	1–2	Winnipeg	OT	Hellebuyck	15,294	13–12–2	28	Recap
28	December 6	Winnipeg	1–3	Chicago		Hutchinson	21,749	13–13–2	28	Recap
29	December 10	Columbus	4–6	Winnipeg		Hellebuyck	15,294	14–13–2	30	Recap
30	December 11	Winnipeg	0–2	Chicago		Hellebuyck	22,021	14–14–2	30	Recap
31	December 15	St. Louis	4–3	Winnipeg		Hellebuyck	15,294	14–15–2	30	Recap
32	December 18	NY Rangers	2–5	Winnipeg		Hellebuyck	15,294	15–15–2	32	Recap
33	December 21	Winnipeg	1–3	Edmonton		Hellebuyck	16,839	15–16–2	32	Recap
34	December 22	Winnipeg	1–4	Calgary		Hutchinson	19,289	15–17–2	32	Recap
35	December 27	Pittsburgh	0–1	Winnipeg		Hellebuyck	15,294	16–17–2	34	Recap
36	December 29	Detroit	1–4	Winnipeg		Hellebuyck	15,294	17–17–2	36	Recap
37	December 31	Winnipeg	2–4	Arizona		Hellebuyck	14,027	17–18–2	36	Recap

January: 5–6–1 (Home: 2–5–0; Road: 3–1–1)
#	Date	Visitor	Score	Home	OT	Decision	Attendance	Record	Pts	Recap
38	January 2	Winnipeg	4–1	San Jose		Hellebuyck	17,562	18–18–2	38	Recap
39	January 3	Winnipeg	1–4	Anaheim		Hutchinson	17,174	18–19–2	38	Recap
40	January 5	Winnipeg	4–1	Nashville		Hellebuyck	17,113	19–19–2	40	Recap
41	January 7	Winnipeg	1–2	Dallas	SO	Hellebuyck	18,532	19–19–3	41	Recap
42	January 10	Buffalo	4–2	Winnipeg		Hellebuyck	15,294	19–20–3	41	Recap
43	January 12	San Jose	4–1	Winnipeg		Hellebuyck	15,294	19–21–3	41	Recap
44	January 14	Nashville	4–5	Winnipeg	OT	Hellebuyck	15,294	20–21–3	43	Recap
45	January 15	Winnipeg	1–0	Minnesota		Hellebuyck	19,222	21–21–3	45	Recap
46	January 18	Colorado	2–1	Winnipeg		Hellebuyck	15,294	21–22–3	45	Recap
47	January 21	Nashville	4–1	Winnipeg		Hellebuyck	15,294	21–23–3	45	Recap
48	January 23	New Jersey	3–1	Winnipeg		Hellebuyck	15,294	21–24–3	45	Recap
49	January 26	Arizona	2–5	Winnipeg		Hellebuyck	15,294	22–24–3	47	Recap

February: 4–7–1 (Home: 0–4–0; Road: 4–3–1)
#	Date	Visitor	Score	Home	OT	Decision	Attendance	Record	Pts	Recap
50	February 2	Dallas	5–3	Winnipeg		Hellebuyck	15,294	22–25–3	47	Recap
51	February 5	Carolina	5–3	Winnipeg		Hutchinson	15,924	22–26–3	47	Recap
52	February 6	Winnipeg	4–2	Colorado		Hutchinson	14,983	23–26–3	49	Recap
53	February 9	Winnipeg	2–1	St. Louis	SO	Hellebuyck	18,323	24–26–3	51	Recap
54	February 11	Boston	6–2	Winnipeg		Hellebuyck	15,294	24–27–3	51	Recap
55	February 13	Winnipeg	2–1	Edmonton	SO	Pavelec	16,839	25–27–3	53	Recap
56	February 16	Winnipeg	1–2	Carolina		Pavelec	10,489	25–28–3	53	Recap
57	February 18	Winnipeg	5–6	Tampa Bay	SO	Pavelec	19,092	25–28–4	54	Recap
58	February 20	Winnipeg	1–3	Florida		Hutchinson	16,210	25–29–4	54	Recap
59	February 23	Dallas	5–3	Winnipeg		Pavelec	15,294	25–30–4	54	Recap
60	February 25	Winnipeg	6–3	Dallas		Hutchinson	18,532	26–30–4	56	Recap
61	February 27	Winnipeg	1–4	Pittsburgh		Hutchinson	18,650	26–31–4	56	Recap

March: 5–8–3 (Home: 4–5–2; Road: 1–3–1)
#	Date	Visitor	Score	Home	OT	Decision	Attendance	Record	Pts	Recap
62	March 1	Florida	3–2	Winnipeg		Pavelec	15,294	26–32–4	56	Recap
63	March 3	NY Islanders	4–3	Winnipeg	OT	Hutchinson	15,294	26–32–5	57	Recap
64	March 5	Montreal	2–4	Winnipeg		Pavelec	15,294	27–32–5	59	Recap
65	March 6	Edmonton	2–1	Winnipeg		Pavelec	15,294	27–33–5	59	Recap
66	March 8	Nashville	4–2	Winnipeg		Pavelec	15,294	27–34–5	59	Recap
67	March 10	Winnipeg	2–3	Detroit		Hutchinson	20,027	27–35–5	59	Recap
68	March 12	Colorado	2–3	Winnipeg		Pavelec	15,294	28–35–5	61	Recap
69	March 14	Winnipeg	5–2	Vancouver		Hutchinson	18,361	29–35–5	63	Recap
70	March 16	Winnipeg	1–4	Calgary		Pavelec	18,929	29–36–5	63	Recap
71	March 18	Chicago	4–0	Winnipeg		Pavelec	15,294	29–37–5	63	Recap
72	March 20	Anaheim	3–2	Winnipeg	OT	Hutchinson	15,294	29–37–6	64	Recap
73	March 22	Vancouver	0–2	Winnipeg		Pavelec	15,294	30–37–6	66	Recap
74	March 24	Los Angeles	1–4	Winnipeg		Pavelec	15,294	31–37–6	68	Recap
75	March 26	Winnipeg	2–3	Buffalo		Hutchinson	19,070	31–38–6	68	Recap
76	March 28	Winnipeg	2–3	Philadelphia	OT	Pavelec	19,100	31–38–7	69	Recap
77	March 30	Ottawa	2–1	Winnipeg		Hutchinson	15,294	31–39–7	69	Recap

April: 4–0–1 (Home: 1–0–1; Road: 3–0–0)
#	Date	Visitor	Score	Home	OT	Decision	Attendance	Record	Pts	Recap
78	April 1	Chicago	5–4	Winnipeg	OT	Pavelec	15,294	31–39–8	70	Recap
79	April 3	Minnesota	1–5	Winnipeg		Pavelec	15,294	32–39–8	72	Recap
80	April 5	Winnipeg	2–1	Anaheim	OT	Hutchinson	16,743	33–39–8	74	Recap
81	April 7	Winnipeg	5–4	San Jose		Pavelec	15,900	34–39–8	76	Recap
82	April 9	Winnipeg	4–3	Los Angeles	SO	Pavelec	18,449	35–39–8	78	Recap

Legend: Win (2 points) Loss (0 points) Overtime/shootout loss (1 point)

== Player statistics ==
Final stats

=== Skaters ===
Regular season
Player	GP	G	A	Pts	+/−	PIM
Blake Wheeler	82	26	52	78	8	49
Mark Scheifele	71	29	32	61	16	48
Dustin Byfuglien	81	19	34	53	4	119
Bryan Little	57	17	25	42	−13	12
Mathieu Perreault	71	9	32	41	−11	36
Drew Stafford	78	21	17	38	−23	28
Nikolaj Ehlers	72	15	23	38	3	21
Andrew Ladd^{‡}	59	17	17	34	−10	39
Tyler Myers	73	9	18	27	6	72
Alexander Burmistrov	81	7	14	21	−11	32
Jacob Trouba	81	6	15	21	10	62
Adam Lowry	74	7	10	17	−9	53
Tobias Enstrom	72	2	14	16	8	44
Andrew Copp	77	7	6	13	8	6
Chris Thorburn	82	6	6	12	−1	81
Joel Armia	43	4	6	10	2	12
Ben Chiarot	70	1	9	10	−9	43
Marko Dano^{†}	21	4	4	8	−7	8
Nic Petan	26	2	4	6	2	10
Anthony Peluso	35	1	4	5	4	44
Mark Stuart	64	1	2	3	−7	66
Matt Halischuk	30	0	3	3	1	4
Scott Kosmachuk	8	0	3	3	1	2
Paul Postma	26	2	0	2	−3	4
JC Lipon	9	0	1	1	0	5
Adam Pardy^{‡}	14	0	1	1	−3	8
Patrice Cormier	2	0	0	0	0	0
Julian Melchiori	11	0	0	0	1	0
Josh Morrissey	1	0	0	0	0	0
Chase De Leo	2	0	0	0	1	0
Brandon Tanev	3	0	0	0	0	2

=== Goaltenders ===
Regular season
Player	GP	GS	TOI	W	L	OT	GA	GAA	SA	SV%	SO	G	A	PIM
Ondrej Pavelec	33	31	1,899	13	13	4	88	2.78	918	.904	1	0	0	0
Michael Hutchinson	30	25	1,586	9	15	3	75	2.84	805	.907	0	0	0	0
Connor Hellebuyck	26	26	1,433	13	11	1	56	2.34	683	.918	2	0	0	0

^{†}Denotes player spent time with another team before joining the Jets. Stats reflect time with the Jets only.
^{‡}Traded mid-season. Stats reflect time with the Jets only.
Bold/italics denotes franchise record

=== Suspensions/fines ===
Player	Explanation	Length	Salary	Date issued
Alexander Burmistrov	Elbowing Minnesota Wild defenseman Jared Spurgeon during NHL Game No. 118 in Winnipeg on Sunday, October 25, 2015, at 13:11 of the second period.	—	$4,166.67	October 26, 2015
Nikolaj Ehlers	Diving/Embellishment during NHL Game No. 547 in Winnipeg on Tuesday, December 29, 2015.	—	$2,000.00	January 7, 2016
Tyler Myers	Cross-checking San Jose Sharks forward Tommy Wingels during NHL Game No. 638 in Winnipeg on Tuesday, January 12, 2016, at 12:55 of the third period.	—	$5,000.00	January 13, 2016
Drew Stafford	High-sticking Colorado Avalanche forward Nick Holden during NHL Game No. 785 in Denver on Saturday, February 6, 2016, at 15:15 of the second period.	1 game	$23,387.10	February 8, 2016

== Awards and honours ==
=== Awards ===
Regular season
Player	Award	Awarded
D. Byfuglien	NHL All-Star game selection	January 6, 2016

=== Milestones ===
Regular season
Player	Milestone	Reached
N. Petan	1st Career NHL Game; 1st Career NHL Goal; 1st Career NHL Point	October 8, 2015
N. Ehlers	1st Career NHL Game	October 8, 2015
N. Ehlers	1st Career NHL Assist; 1st Career NHL Point	October 9, 2015
N. Ehlers	1st Career NHL Goal	October 13, 2015
A. Ladd	700th Career NHL Game	October 27, 2015
M. Perreault	300th Career NHL Game	October 29, 2015
D. Stafford	600th Career NHL Game	October 31, 2015
T. Myers	400th Career NHL Game	October 31, 2015
A. Copp	1st Career NHL Goal	October 31, 2015
C. Hellebuyck	1st Career NHL Game; 1st Career NHL Win	November 27, 2015
M. Perreault	100th Career NHL Assist	December 2, 2015
M. Scheifele	100th Career NHL Point	December 2, 2015
M. Stuart	600th Career NHL Game	December 21, 2015

== Transactions ==
Winnipeg has been involved in the following transactions during the 2015–16 season.

=== Trades ===
Date	Details		Ref
February 25, 2016	To Chicago Blackhawks Andrew Ladd^{Note 1} Jay Harrison; Matt Fraser	To Winnipeg Jets Marko Dano; 1st-round pick in 2016 conditional 3rd-round pick in 2018

- ^{Note 1} Winnipeg to retain 36% ($1.584 million) of salary as part of trade.

=== Free agents acquired ===
Date	Player	Former team	Contract terms (in U.S. dollars)	Ref
July 2, 2015	Matt Fraser	Edmonton Oilers	1 year, $650,000	
July 3, 2015	Andrew MacWilliam	Toronto Maple Leafs	1 year, $600,000	
October 6, 2015	Thomas Raffl	Red Bull Salzburg	1 year, $575,000	
March 30, 2016	Brandon Tanev	Providence College	1 year, $925,000	

=== Free agents lost ===
Date	Player	New team	Contract terms (in U.S. dollars)	Ref
July 1, 2015	Michael Frolik	Calgary Flames	5 years, $21.5 million	
July 1, 2015	Eric O'Dell	Ottawa Senators	1 year, $700,000	
July 2, 2015	Will O'Neill	Pittsburgh Penguins	1 year, $575,000	
July 7, 2015	Keaton Ellerby	Barys Astana (KHL)	1 year	
September 17, 2015	Jiri Tlusty	New Jersey Devils	1 year, $800,000	
October 3, 2015	Lee Stempniak	New Jersey Devils	1 year, $850,000	

=== Claimed via waivers ===
Player	Former team	Date claimed off waivers	Ref

=== Lost via waivers ===
Player	New team	Date claimed off waivers	Ref
Adam Pardy	Edmonton Oilers	February 29, 2016	

=== Lost via retirement ===
Player	Ref

=== Player signings ===
Date	Player	Contract terms (in U.S. dollars)	Ref
June 29, 2015	Drew Stafford	2 years, $8.7 million	
July 1, 2015	Adam Pardy	1 year, $1 million	
July 1, 2015	Matt Halischuk	1 year, $750,000	
July 1, 2015	Alexander Burmistrov	2 years, 3.1 million	
July 2, 2015	Patrice Cormier	1 year, $650,000	
July 3, 2015	Brendan Lemieux	3 year, $3.375 million entry-level contract	
July 10, 2015	Paul Postma	2 years, $1.775 million	
February 8, 2016	Dustin Byfuglien	5 years, $38 million contract extension	
April 11, 2016	Kyle Connor	3 years, $5.325 million entry-level contract	
June 1, 2016	Nelson Nogier	3 years, $2.32 million entry-level contract	
June 21, 2016	Michael Hutchinson	2 years, $2.3 million	

== Draft picks ==
Below are the Winnipeg Jets' selections at the 2015 NHL entry draft, to be held on June 26–27, 2015 at the BB&T Center in Sunrise, Florida.

Round	#	Player	Pos	Nationality	College/Junior/Club team (League)
1	17	Kyle Connor	Left wing	United States	Youngstown Phantoms (USHL)
1	25^{[a]}	Jack Roslovic	Centre	United States	U.S. National Team Development Program
2	47	Jansen Harkins	Centre	Canada	Prince George Cougars (WHL)
3	78	Erik Foley	Left wing	United States	Cedar Rapids Roughriders (USHL)
4	108	Michael Spacek	Right wing	Czech Republic	HC Pardubice (Czech)
6	168	Mason Appleton	Centre	United States	Tri-City Storm (USHL)
7	198	Sami Niku	Defense	Finland	JYP (Liiga)
7	203^{[b]}	Matteo Gennaro	Centre	Canada	Prince Albert Raiders (WHL)

Draft notes

- ^{a} The Sabres' first-round pick went to the Winnipeg Jets as the result of a trade on February 11, 2015 that sent Evander Kane, Zach Bogosian and Jason Kasdorf to Buffalo in exchange for Tyler Myers, Drew Stafford, Joel Armia, Brendan Lemieux and this pick (being conditional at the time of the trade). The condition – Winnipeg will receive the lowest of Buffalo's first-round picks in 2015 – was converted on April 27, 2015 when the Islanders were eliminated from the 2015 Stanley Cup playoffs, ensuring that the Blues' first-round pick would be lower.
- The Winnipeg Jets' fifth-round pick went to the Carolina Hurricanes as the result of a trade on February 25, 2015 that sent Jiri Tlusty to Winnipeg in exchange for a third-round pick in 2016 and this pick (being conditional at the time of the trade). The condition – Carolina will receive a fifth-round pick in 2015 if Winnipeg qualifies for the 2015 Stanley Cup playoffs – was converted on April 9, 2015.
- ^{b} The Washington Capitals' seventh-round pick went to the Winnipeg Jets as the result of a trade on June 28, 2014 that sent Edward Pasquale and a sixth-round pick in 2014 to Washington in exchange for a sixth-round pick in 2014, Nashville's seventh-round pick in 2014 and this pick.
