= Ryan Garbutt =

Canadian ice hockey player (born 1985)

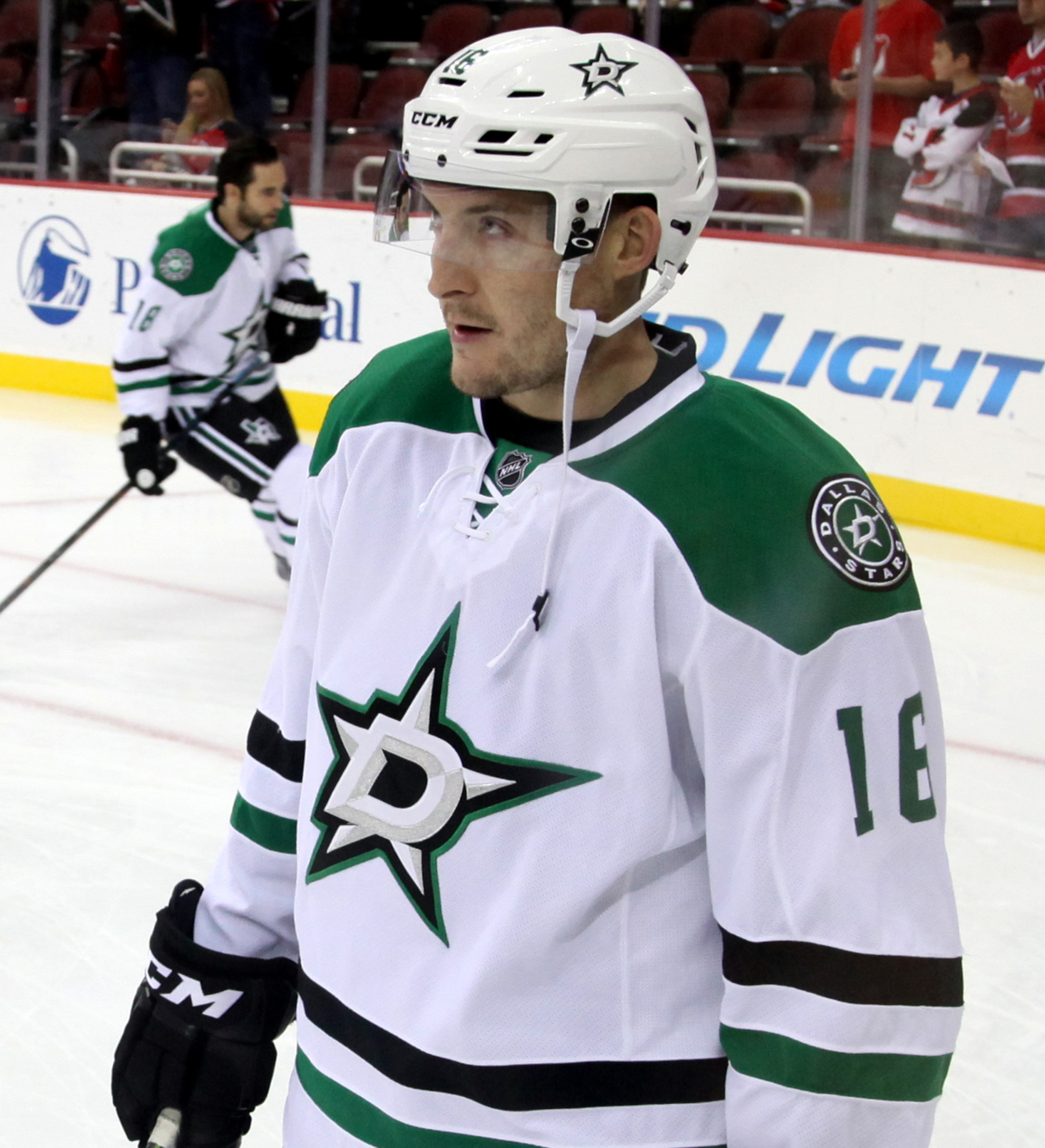
- Garbutt in October 2014.
- Born: August 12, 1985 (age 41) Winnipeg, Manitoba, Canada
- Height: 6 ft 0 in (183 cm)
- Weight: 190 lb (86 kg; 13 st 8 lb)
- Position: Centre
- Shot: Left
- Played for: Dallas Stars; Chicago Blackhawks; Anaheim Ducks; HC Sochi; Torpedo Nizhny Novgorod; HC Slovan Bratislava; ERC Ingolstadt
- NHL draft: Undrafted
- Playing career: 2009–2019

Ryan Jonathan Garbutt (born August 12, 1985) is a Canadian former professional ice hockey player. He last played under contract to ERC Ingolstadt of the Deutsche Eishockey Liga (DEL).

== Playing career ==
Undrafted, Garbutt attended Brown University, playing four years of collegiate hockey in the ECAC. He began his professional career in the Central Hockey League during the 2009–10 season with the Corpus Christi Icerays. In his second professional season, Garbutt signed in the ECHL with the Gwinnett Gladiators before he was loaned to and remained with the Chicago Wolves on an American Hockey League contract to end the 2010–11 season.

On July 1, 2011, Garbutt's prominent rise through the professional ranks continued when he was signed to his first NHL contract on a one-year two-way contract by the Dallas Stars as a free agent. In the 2011–12 season, Garbutt was recalled by Dallas from AHL affiliate, Texas and scored his first NHL goal on February 21, 2012, against Carey Price of the Montreal Canadiens.

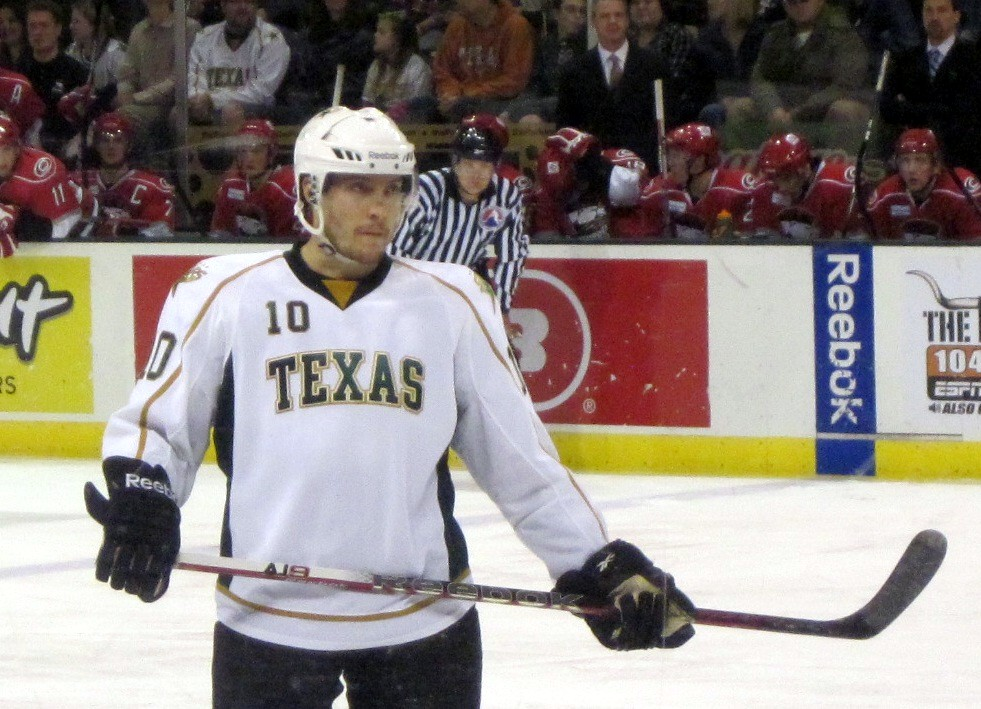
Garbutt in 2011.

On July 16, 2012, the Stars re-signed Garbutt to a one-way, two-year contract worth $1.15 million.

On January 29, 2014, Garbutt signed a three-year contract extension with the Stars worth $5.4 million.

On July 10, 2015, Garbutt and teammate Trevor Daley were traded by the Stars to the Chicago Blackhawks in exchange for Patrick Sharp and Stephen Johns. In the following 2015–16 season, Garbutt appeared in 43 games for 6 points with the Blackhawks before he was traded again to the Anaheim Ducks in exchange for Jiri Sekac on January 21, 2016. Garbutt assumed regular checking duties on the Ducks fourth-line, closing out the season with 5 goals and 8 points in 37 games.

In the 2016–17 season, Garbutt struggled in contributing with just 2 goals in 27 games before he was placed on waivers by the Ducks. He was later reassigned to AHL affiliate, the San Diego Gulls, appearing in 28 games for 10 points before he was ruled out from the remainder of the regular season with injury.

As an impending free agent, Garbutt left the NHL after six seasons in agreeing to a one-year deal with Russian club, HC Sochi of the KHL, on May 3, 2017. Garbutt played just 12 games with Sochi to start the 2017–18 season, before leaving the club to immediately join competitors Torpedo Nizhny Novgorod on October 6, 2017. Garbutt featured in 9 games with Torpedo before he was again on the move to his third club for the season in HC Slovan Bratislava on December 27, 2017.

Garbutt continued his career in Europe over the summer, agreeing to a one-year contract as a free agent with German outfit, ERC Ingolstadt of the Deutsche Eishockey Liga on August 22, 2018. Suffering a hand injury leading into the 2018–19 season, Garbutt returned from his setback to record 15 points in 38 games, before opting to leave the club at the conclusion of the post-season.

== Career statistics ==
			Regular season					Playoffs
Season	Team	League	GP	G	A	Pts	PIM	GP	G	A	Pts	PIM
2003–04	Winnipeg South Blues	MJHL	60	23	25	48	143	—	—	—	—	—
2004–05	Winnipeg South Blues	MJHL	63	47	34	81	303	—	—	—	—	—
2005–06	Brown University	ECAC	28	2	4	6	61	—	—	—	—	—
2006–07	Brown University	ECAC	29	9	4	13	30	—	—	—	—	—
2007–08	Brown University	ECAC	29	12	11	23	56	—	—	—	—	—
2008–09	Brown University	ECAC	30	6	10	16	56	—	—	—	—	—
2009–10	Corpus Christi Icerays	CHL	64	22	28	50	204	1	0	0	0	2
2010–11	Gwinnett Gladiators	ECHL	10	10	7	17	24	—	—	—	—	—
2010–11	Chicago Wolves	AHL	65	19	18	37	118	—	—	—	—	—
2011–12	Texas Stars	AHL	50	16	17	33	96	—	—	—	—	—
2011–12	Dallas Stars	NHL	20	2	1	3	22	—	—	—	—	—
2012–13	Dallas Stars	NHL	36	3	7	10	32	—	—	—	—	—
2013–14	Dallas Stars	NHL	75	17	15	32	106	6	3	0	3	25
2014–15	Dallas Stars	NHL	67	8	17	25	55	—	—	—	—	—
2015–16	Chicago Blackhawks	NHL	43	2	4	6	27	—	—	—	—	—
2015–16	Anaheim Ducks	NHL	37	5	3	8	21	7	1	0	1	6
2016–17	Anaheim Ducks	NHL	27	2	1	3	20	—	—	—	—	—
2016–17	San Diego Gulls	AHL	28	4	6	10	45	—	—	—	—	—
2017–18	HC Sochi	KHL	12	1	4	5	32	—	—	—	—	—
2017–18	Torpedo Nizhny Novgorod	KHL	9	0	2	2	4	—	—	—	—	—
2017–18	HC Slovan Bratislava	KHL	10	2	3	5	42	—	—	—	—	—
2018–19	ERC Ingolstadt	DEL	38	6	9	15	66	7	1	0	1	6
NHL totals			305	39	48	87	283	13	4	0	4	31
