= List of 2015–16 NHL Three Star Awards =

The 2015–16 NHL Three Star Awards are the way the National Hockey League denotes its players of the week and players of the month of the 2015–16 season.

== Weekly ==
Weekly
Week	First Star	Second Star	Third Star
October 11, 2015	Justin Abdelkader (Detroit Red Wings)	Oscar Lindberg (New York Rangers)	Mike Smith (Arizona Coyotes)
October 18, 2015	Carey Price (Montreal Canadiens)	Tyler Seguin (Dallas Stars)	Vladimir Tarasenko (St. Louis Blues)
October 25, 2015	Evgeny Kuznetsov (Washington Capitals)	Andrei Markov (Montreal Canadiens)	Jonathan Quick (Los Angeles Kings)
November 1, 2015	Brad Marchand (Boston Bruins)	Jake Allen (St. Louis Blues)	Taylor Hall (Edmonton Oilers)
November 8, 2015	Patrick Kane (Chicago Blackhawks)	Tyler Seguin (Dallas Stars)	Mike Condon (Montreal Canadiens)
November 15, 2015	Matt Duchene (Colorado Avalanche)	Mats Zuccarello (New York Rangers)	James Reimer (Toronto Maple Leafs)
November 22, 2015	Martin Jones (San Jose Sharks)	Daniel Sedin (Vancouver Canucks)	Kevin Shattenkirk (St. Louis Blues)
November 29, 2015	Jamie Benn (Dallas Stars)	Braden Holtby (Washington Capitals)	Alex Galchenyuk (Montreal Canadiens)
December 6, 2015	John Gibson (Anaheim Ducks)	Shea Weber (Nashville Predators)	Mike Cammalleri (New Jersey Devils)
December 13, 2015	Corey Crawford (Chicago Blackhawks)	Taylor Hall (Edmonton Oilers)	Justin Faulk (Carolina Hurricanes)
December 20, 2015	Semyon Varlamov (Colorado Avalanche)	T.J. Oshie (Washington Capitals)	Mikko Koivu (Minnesota Wild)
December 27, 2015	Johnny Gaudreau (Calgary Flames)	Antti Niemi (Dallas Stars)	Tyler Bozak (Toronto Maple Leafs)
January 3, 2016	Jonathan Quick (Los Angeles Kings)	Shane Doan (Arizona Coyotes)	Kris Letang (Pittsburgh Penguins)
January 10, 2016	Alexander Ovechkin (Washington Capitals)	Petr Mrazek (Detroit Red Wings)	Tyson Barrie (Colorado Avalanche)
January 17, 2016	Patrick Kane (Chicago Blackhawks)	Sam Bennett (Calgary Flames)	Anze Kopitar (Los Angeles Kings)
January 24, 2016	Semyon Varlamov (Colorado Avalanche)	Lee Stempniak (New Jersey Devils)	Brian Elliott (St. Louis Blues)
January 31, 2016	John Scott (Pacific Division All Stars)	Cam Atkinson (Columbus Blue Jackets)	Jack Eichel (Buffalo Sabres)
February 7, 2016	Sidney Crosby (Pittsburgh Penguins)	Erik Karlsson (Ottawa Senators)	Vincent Trocheck (Florida Panthers)
February 14, 2016	Pavel Datsyuk (Detroit Red Wings)	Henrik Lundqvist (New York Rangers)	Brad Marchand (Boston Bruins)
February 21, 2016	Jaromir Jagr (Florida Panthers)	Erik Haula (Minnesota Wild)	Craig Anderson (Ottawa Senators)
February 28, 2016	Filip Forsberg (Nashville Predators)	Ryan Callahan (Tampa Bay Lightning)	Mike Condon (Montreal Canadiens)
March 6, 2016	Cam Talbot (Edmonton Oilers)	Mark Scheifele (Winnipeg Jets)	Brent Burns (San Jose Sharks)
March 13, 2016	Vladimir Tarasenko (St. Louis Blues)	Vincent Trocheck (Florida Panthers)	Keith Kinkaid (New Jersey Devils)
March 20, 2016	Sidney Crosby (Pittsburgh Penguins)	Jonathan Quick (Los Angeles Kings)	Sean Monahan (Calgary Flames)
March 27, 2016	Zach Parise (Minnesota Wild)	Brian Elliott (St. Louis Blues)	Phil Kessel (Pittsburgh Penguins)
April 3, 2016	Artemi Panarin (Chicago Blackhawks)	Brent Burns (San Jose Sharks)	Matt Murray (Pittsburgh Penguins)
April 10, 2016	John Tavares (New York Islanders)	Patrick Kane (Chicago Blackhawks)	Alexander Ovechkin (Washington Capitals)

== Monthly ==
Monthly
Month	First Star	Second Star	Third Star
October	Jamie Benn (Dallas Stars)	Carey Price (Montreal Canadiens)	David Krejci (Boston Bruins)
November	Patrick Kane (Chicago Blackhawks)	Braden Holtby (Washington Capitals)	Matt Duchene (Colorado Avalanche)
December	Johnny Gaudreau (Calgary Flames)	Braden Holtby (Washington Capitals)	Patrick Kane (Chicago Blackhawks)
January	Evgeny Kuznetsov (Washington Capitals)	Corey Crawford (Chicago Blackhawks)	Kris Letang (Pittsburgh Penguins)
February	Ryan Getzlaf (Anaheim Ducks)	Alexander Ovechkin (Washington Capitals)	Filip Forsberg (Nashville Predators)
March	Sidney Crosby (Pittsburgh Penguins)	Devan Dubnyk (Minnesota Wild)	Brent Burns (San Jose Sharks)

== Rookie of the Month ==
Rookie of the Month
Month	Player
October	Connor McDavid (Edmonton Oilers)
November	Dylan Larkin (Detroit Red Wings)
December	John Gibson (Anaheim Ducks)
January	Louis Domingue (Arizona Coyotes)
February	Connor McDavid (Edmonton Oilers)
March	Connor McDavid (Edmonton Oilers)

== See also ==
- Three stars (ice hockey)
- 2015–16 NHL season
- 2015–16 NHL suspensions and fines
- 2015–16 NHL transactions
- 2015 NHL entry draft
- 2015 in sports
- 2016 in sports
- 2013–14 NHL Three Star Awards
