= 2015–16 Calgary Flames season =

NHL team season

2015–16 Calgary Flames
- Division: 5th Pacific
- Conference: 12th Western
- 2015–16 record: 35–40–7
- Home record: 21–16–4
- Road record: 14–24–3
- Goals for: 231
- Goals against: 260

Team information
- General manager: Brad Treliving
- Coach: Bob Hartley
- Captain: Mark Giordano
- Alternate captains: Sean Monahan; Kris Russell (Oct.–Feb.); Dennis Wideman
- Arena: Scotiabank Saddledome
- Average attendance: 19,145 (99.3%)
- Minor league affiliates: Stockton Heat (AHL); Adirondack Thunder (ECHL)

Team leaders
- Goals: Johnny Gaudreau (30)
- Assists: Johnny Gaudreau (48)
- Points: Johnny Gaudreau (78)
- Penalty minutes: Brandon Bollig (103)
- Plus/minus: Mikael Backlund (+10)
- Wins: Karri Ramo (17)
- Goals against average: Karri Ramo (2.63)

The 2015–16 Calgary Flames season was the 36th season in Calgary and 44th in the National Hockey League (NHL) for the Flames franchise. Coming off an unexpected run to the second round of the Stanley Cup playoffs in 2014–15, and having acquired defenceman Dougie Hamilton and forward Michael Frolik in the off-season, the Flames were expected to again compete for a playoff spot in 2015–16. Instead, the team struggled. Calgary missed the playoffs and spent much of the season languishing near the bottom of the NHL standings. Defenceman Dennis Wideman had a difficult season individually as he became embroiled in controversy after striking linesman Don Henderson after himself suffering a concussion during a game. The NHL suspended Wideman for 20 games for abuse of an official, prompting a pair of appeals from the National Hockey League Players' Association (NHLPA). The second appeal, to a neutral arbitrator, found that the suspension was excessive, and reduced it to ten games, though Wideman had already missed 19 contests when the ruling was made.

== Off-season ==
Calgary entered the 2015 NHL entry draft holding the 15th overall selection in the first round, but sent that pick (along with a pair of second-rounders) to the Boston Bruins in exchange for 22-year-old defenceman Dougie Hamilton in a draft-day trade. The acquisition of Hamilton solidified a Calgary defence that includes captain Mark Giordano, T. J. Brodie, Dennis Wideman and Kris Russell – all of whom scored at least 34 points in 2014–15 – and which The Hockey News called "one of the most complete" defensive units in the league. The Flames added to their forward ranks on the first day of the free agent signing period by agreeing to a five-year, $21 million contract with Michael Frolik, formerly of the Winnipeg Jets.

The Flames were widely predicted to be among the worst teams in the NHL in 2014–15. The team defied the predictions and reached the second round of the playoffs following a third-place finish in the Pacific Division. As a consequence of that season, Calgary entered 2015–16 with dramatically higher expectations. The Hockey News predicted the Flames would again finish third in the Pacific, behind the Anaheim Ducks and Los Angeles Kings, and qualify for the 2016 Stanley Cup playoffs.

== Regular season ==
=== October – December ===
The Flames began the season without T. J. Brodie, who suffered a broken hand during a pre-season game and was expected to miss as much as six weeks. Injuries to Lance Bouma (leg), and Micheal Ferland (knee), followed early in the season. On the ice, the team struggled in October. The Flames lost their season and home opener 5–1 against the Vancouver Canucks on October 7. Though the Flames defeated the Canucks in the return match-up three nights later, Calgary then lost 9 of their following 11 games to start the year with just three wins against nine regulation losses and an overtime loss. The poor start forced the team into a position where they would have to make recent NHL history in order to qualify for the 2016 Stanley Cup playoffs. No team since the introduction of the shootout in 2005–06 had qualified for the post-season after earning only seven or fewer points in their first 13 games.

The Flames improved marginally in November, as the team won five of its following eight games, including all four played on home ice in the month. However, a late November road trip that ended in losses to the Anaheim Ducks, Arizona Coyotes and San Jose Sharks resulted in Calgary entering December with only eight wins and 18 points on the season. The loss to the Ducks away in Anaheim was particularly frustrating for the team as they held 2–0 and 3–2 leads before dropping a 5–3 decision. It was the 21st consecutive regular season loss for the team at the Honda Center, a streak that dates back to January 19, 2004. Much of the team's struggles were attributed to the Flames' poor special teams, as Calgary sat last in the NHL in both the Power play and on the penalty kill. Consequently, the Flames sat dead last in the NHL standings by early December.

A five-game home stand to begin December reversed the team's fortunes, as Calgary won all five games and ran their home ice winning streak to nine. The Flames were led by their top players, as leading forwards Johnny Gaudreau and Sean Monahan, as well as top defencemen Mark Giordano and T. J. Brodie, combined for 12 goals and 16 assists during the homestand. The team's success was also driven by the team's prowess in the NHL's new three-on-three overtime format: The Flames won three games on the homestand in overtime (in addition to a shootout victory). The team's record in the overtime periods stood at a league-best seven wins in eight games decided in overtime, and Gaudreau led all NHL players in scoring with three goals and three assists. Opening a four-game road trip against the Nashville Predators on December 15, the Flames again won in overtime, and Gaudreau again recorded a point as he assisted on Kris Russell's winning tally. The victory pulled the Flames' record back to the .500 mark at 14–14–2. A 3–1 victory two nights later against the Dallas Stars elevated the team into a playoff position for the first time as they moved into third place in the Pacific Division. Calgary's overall winning streak ended at seven games on December 19 as the team fell 3–2 to the St. Louis Blues before ending the road trip with a 4–2 loss against the Detroit Red Wings. The Flames returned to the Saddledome for their final game before the Christmas break on December 22 and, led by Johnny Gaudreau's second hat trick of the season, defeated the Winnipeg Jets 4–1. It was Calgary's tenth consecutive win on home ice, which tied the franchise record set between November 7 and December 12, 2006.

The Flames broke the team record on December 27, as they recorded their 11th-straight home win with a 5–3 victory over the Edmonton Oilers. Gaudreau scored two goals in the contest, and with five in two games, was named both the NHL's First Star of the Week for December 21–27, and the league's First Star for the month of December. The home winning streak came to an end on December 29, as the Anaheim Ducks defeated Calgary 1–0; it was the Flames' first home ice loss in two months. Calgary ended the year with another home loss, on December 31 to the Los Angeles Kings.

=== January – February ===
The Flames opened the new year with victories over the Colorado Avalanche and Tampa Bay Lightning before losing consecutive games to division rivals the Arizona Coyotes and San Jose Sharks. Calgary then scored a dominating 6–0 victory over the Florida Panthers on January 13; rookie Sam Bennett scored four goals in the contest. In so doing, he became the youngest player in Flames' history (19 years, six months) to record both a hat trick and a four-goal game, and the first Flame to score four since Jarome Iginla in 2003. Bennett was named the league's Second Star for the week of January 11–17. The Flames struggled for the rest of the month as they won only one game on a five-game road trip, before returning home and losing to the Nashville Predators on January 27 in their final game before the All-Star break. With a record of 21–24–3. Calgary had fallen toward the bottom of the league standings. As the team entered the break, the Flames had fallen to sixth in the division and 12th place in the conference, and head coach Bob Hartley lamented the team's inconsistent play.

The Flames had two participants at the All-Star Game, played in Nashville: Mark Giordano and Johnny Gaudreau were named to the Pacific Division team and both played in their second consecutive All-Star Game. The pair helped the Pacific Division team win the four-team mini tournament and share a $1 million prize.

During the team's all-star break, the National Hockey League reviewed a controversial incident between defenceman Dennis Wideman and linesman Don Henderson in the Nashville game. Wideman was checked hard by an opposing player partway through the first period and, as he slowly skated back to the Flames bench, collided with Henderson then pushed off the official with an apparent crosscheck. After the game, Wideman said he was distracted by pain in his neck and shoulder following the bodycheck he received and did not notice Henderson until it was too late to avoid a collision. The league reviewed the incident over the all-star break and, following a February 2 hearing, rejected Wideman's explanation and determined the collision was a deliberate abuse of an official. The league announced the following day that it had suspended Wideman for 20 games, the penalty described in the league rule book for "any player who deliberately strikes an official and causes injury or who deliberately applies physical force in any manner against an official with intent to injure". Wideman would also forfeit over $560,000 in salary due to the suspension. Both the Flames and Wideman expressed their disappointment in the severity of the suspension, while the National Hockey League Players' Association (NHLPA) immediately appealed it on Wideman's behalf. The NHLPA argued Wideman had no intention of colliding with or harming Henderson, and pointed to "medical evidence" presented in the disciplinary hearing regarding Wideman's condition at the time of the incident.

Further controversy arose for the Flames following the all-star break as Monahan, Gaudreau and Bouma were all held out of the lineup by head coach Bob Hartley for the team's February 9 game against the Toronto Maple Leafs. The trio were late for a team meeting the previous day, and were scratched from the Toronto game for disciplinary reasons. The decision allowed defenceman Jakub Nakladal to make his NHL debut in the game, a 4–3 victory. The trio returned to the lineup two nights later in a wild 6–5 shootout win over the San Jose Sharks, a game in which goaltender Karri Ramo suffered a serious left knee injury after being knocked into the goalpost. The injury was revealed to be a torn anterior cruciate ligament (ACL) and meniscus damage that ended his season. However, the team's playoff hopes were greatly diminished in the following two games – a 4–1 loss in Phoenix and a 6–4 defeat to Anaheim in a Family Day matinee at home on February 15 – and left the team ten points outside of a playoff spot.

=== March – April ===
Gary Bettman upheld Wideman's suspension on appeal, which prompted the NHLPA to further appeal to an independent arbitrator, the first time since the process was created in 2013 that the NHLPA had taken this step. The process was criticized for how slowly it moved, as Wideman had already served 19 games of his suspension when the arbitrator ruled against the NHL's position that Wideman intended to injure the official, and reduced his suspension to ten games. Consequently, he had $280,000 in salary returned for the time he should not have missed. Wideman's return to the Flames' lineup was short-lived as he suffered a season-ending triceps injury one week after being reinstated in a March 17 game.

On the ice the Flames continued to struggle. After losing eight of their final nine games in February, the Flames won only two of six games to begin March. The team enjoyed a 3–0–1 stretch that began on March 15 with a Michael Frolik hat trick in a 7–4 victory over the St. Louis Blues, and ended with goaltender Niklas Backstrom, acquired from the Minnesota Wild in a trade at the deadline, recording a 4–1 victory over Montreal in his first NHL contest in over a year on March 21.

The Flames were eliminated from post-season contention on March 26, prior to a 4–1 home defeat to Chicago. A few nights later, on March 30, Calgary tied the NHL record for most consecutive road losses to one team as they skated to their 23rd consecutive regular season defeat in Anaheim. However, in the 8–3 loss, Mark Giordano became the first Flames' defenceman to score 20 goals in one season since Dion Phaneuf in 2005–06, while rookie Hunter Shinkaruk scored his first NHL goal.

== Standings ==
Pacific Division
Pos	Team	GP	W	L	OTL	ROW	GF	GA	GD	Pts
1	y – Anaheim Ducks	82	46	25	11	43	218	192	+26	103
2	x – Los Angeles Kings	82	48	28	6	46	225	195	+30	102
3	x – San Jose Sharks	82	46	30	6	42	241	210	+31	98
4	Arizona Coyotes	82	35	39	8	34	209	245	−36	78
5	Calgary Flames	82	35	40	7	33	231	260	−29	77
6	Vancouver Canucks	82	31	38	13	26	191	243	−52	75
7	Edmonton Oilers	82	31	43	8	27	203	245	−42	70

Source: National Hockey League
x – Clinched playoff spot; y – Clinched division

Western Conference Wild Card
Pos	Div	Team	GP	W	L	OTL	ROW	GF	GA	GD	Pts
1	CE	x – Nashville Predators	82	41	27	14	37	228	215	+13	96
2	CE	x – Minnesota Wild	82	38	33	11	35	216	206	+10	87
3	CE	Colorado Avalanche	82	39	39	4	35	216	240	−24	82
4	PA	Arizona Coyotes	82	35	39	8	34	209	245	−36	78
5	CE	Winnipeg Jets	82	35	39	8	32	215	239	−24	78
6	PA	Calgary Flames	82	35	40	7	33	231	260	−29	77
7	PA	Vancouver Canucks	82	31	38	13	26	191	243	−52	75
8	PA	Edmonton Oilers	82	31	43	8	27	203	245	−42	70

Source: National Hockey League
x – Clinched playoff spot

== Schedule and results ==
=== Pre-season ===
Preseason game log: 4–4–0 (Home: 2–2–0; Road: 2–2–0)
#	Date	Visitor	Score	Home	OT	Decision	Attendance	Record	Recap
1	September 21	Calgary	2–4	Edmonton		McDonald	––	0–1–0
2	September 21	Edmonton	3–1	Calgary		Hiller	19,159	0–2–0
3	September 24	Calgary	1–0	Colorado		Ortio	––	1–2–0
4	September 25	Vancouver	1–4	Calgary		Hiller	19,289	2–2–0
5	September 26	Calgary	4–3	Vancouver	OT	Ramo	––	3–2–0
6	September 29	Colorado	0–2	Calgary		Hiller	18,806	4–2–0
7	October 1	Calgary	1–3	Winnipeg		Ortio	15,294	4–3–0
8	October 3	Winnipeg	3–2	Calgary		Ramo	19,289	4–4–0

=== Regular season ===
2015–16 Calgary Flames game log

October: 3–8–1 (Home: 1–5–0; Road: 2–3–1)
#	Date	Visitor	Score	Home	OT	Decision	Attendance	Record	Pts	Recap
1	October 7	Vancouver	5–1	Calgary		Ramo	19,289	0–1–0	0
2	October 10	Calgary	3–2	Vancouver	OT	Hiller	18,570	1–1–0	2
3	October 13	St. Louis	4–3	Calgary		Hiller	18,632	1–2–0	2
4	October 16	Calgary	1–3	Winnipeg		Ramo	15,016	1–3–0	2
5	October 17	Edmonton	5–2	Calgary		Hiller	19,289	1–4–0	2
6	October 20	Washington	6–2	Calgary		Ramo	18,303	1–5–0	2
7	October 23	Detroit	2–3	Calgary	OT	Hiller	19,158	2–5–0	4
8	October 25	Calgary	1–4	NY Rangers		Hiller	18,006	2–6–0	4
9	October 26	Calgary	0–4	NY Islanders		Ortio	11,582	2–7–0	4
10	October 28	Calgary	4–5	Ottawa	SO	Ortio	16,923	2–7–1	5
11	October 30	Montreal	6–2	Calgary		Ortio	19,289	2–8–1	5
12	October 31	Calgary	5–4	Edmonton		Ramo	16,839	3–8–1	7

November: 5–6–1 (Home: 4–0–0; Road: 1–6–1)
#	Date	Visitor	Score	Home	OT	Decision	Attendance	Record	Pts	Recap
13	November 3	Calgary	3–6	Colorado		Ramo	14,408	3–9–1	7
14	November 5	Philadelphia	1–2	Calgary	OT	Ramo	19,289	4–9–1	9
15	November 7	Pittsburgh	2–5	Calgary		Ramo	19,289	5–9–1	11
16	November 10	Calgary	3–4	Florida		Ramo	11,242	5–10–1	11
17	November 12	Calgary	1–3	Tampa Bay		Ramo	19,092	5–11–1	11
18	November 13	Calgary	3–2	Washington	OT	Ramo	18,506	6–11–1	13
19	November 15	Calgary	1–4	Chicago		Ramo	21,629	6–12–1	13
20	November 17	New Jersey	2–3	Calgary		Ramo	19,289	7–12–1	15
21	November 20	Chicago	1–2	Calgary	OT	Ramo	19,289	8–12–1	17
22	November 24	Calgary	3–5	Anaheim		Ramo	15,688	8–13–1	17
23	November 27	Calgary	1–2	Arizona	OT	Ramo	11,495	8–13–2	18
24	November 28	Calgary	2–5	San Jose		Hiller	17,283	8–14–2	18

December: 9–4–0 (Home: 7–2–0; Road: 2–2–0)
#	Date	Visitor	Score	Home	OT	Decision	Attendance	Record	Pts	Recap
25	December 1	Dallas	3–4	Calgary	SO	Ramo	19,237	9–14–2	20
26	December 4	Boston	4–5	Calgary	OT	Ramo	19,289	10–14–2	22
27	December 8	San Jose	2–4	Calgary		Ramo	19,289	11–14–2	24
28	December 10	Buffalo	3–4	Calgary		Hiller	18,565	12–14–2	26
29	December 12	NY Rangers	4–5	Calgary	OT	Hiller	19,289	13–14–2	28
30	December 15	Calgary	2–1	Nashville	OT	Ramo	15,431	14–14–2	30
31	December 17	Calgary	3–1	Dallas		Ramo	18,410	15–14–2	32
32	December 19	Calgary	2–3	St. Louis		Ramo	18,163	15–15–2	32
33	December 20	Calgary	2–4	Detroit		Ramo	20,027	15–16–2	32
34	December 22	Winnipeg	1–4	Calgary		Ramo	19,289	16–16–2	34
35	December 27	Edmonton	3–5	Calgary		Ramo	19,289	17–16–2	36
36	December 29	Anaheim	1–0	Calgary		Ramo	19,289	17–17–2	36
37	December 31	Los Angeles	4–1	Calgary		Ramo	19,289	17–18–2	36

January: 4–6–1 (Home: 2–3–0; Road: 2–3–1)
#	Date	Visitor	Score	Home	OT	Decision	Attendance	Record	Pts	Recap
38	January 2	Calgary	4–0	Colorado		Ramo	18,087	18–18–2	38
39	January 5	Tampa Bay	1–3	Calgary		Ramo	18,966	19–18–2	40
40	January 7	Arizona	2–1	Calgary		Ramo	19,272	19–19–2	40
41	January 11	San Jose	5–4	Calgary		Ramo	19,227	19–20–2	40
42	January 13	Florida	0–6	Calgary		Hiller	18,702	20–20–2	42
43	January 16	Calgary	1–2	Edmonton	SO	Hiller	16,839	20–20–3	43
44	January 19	Calgary	2–4	New Jersey		Hiller	14,319	20–21–3	43
45	January 21	Calgary	4–2	Columbus		Ramo	12,492	21–21–3	45
46	January 24	Calgary	2–5	Carolina		Ramo	9,934	21–22–3	45
47	January 25	Calgary	1–2	Dallas		Ramo	18,532	21–23–3	45
48	January 27	Nashville	2–1	Calgary		Ramo	19,289	21–24–3	45
January 28–31		All-Star Break in Nashville, Tennessee

February: 5–8–1 (Home: 3–4–1; Road: 2–4–0)
#	Date	Visitor	Score	Home	OT	Decision	Attendance	Record	Pts	Recap
49	February 3	Carolina	1–4	Calgary		Ramo	18,895	22–24–3	47
50	February 5	Columbus	2–1	Calgary		Ramo	19,289	22–25–3	47
51	February 6	Calgary	4–1	Vancouver		Hiller	18,570	23–25–3	49
52	February 9	Toronto	3–4	Calgary		Hiller	19,289	24–25–3	51
53	February 11	Calgary	6–5	San Jose	SO	Hiller	16,854	25–25–3	53
54	February 12	Calgary	1–4	Arizona		Hiller	13,643	25–26–3	53
55	February 15	Anaheim	6–4	Calgary		Ortio	19,289	25–27–3	53
56	February 17	Minnesota	5–3	Calgary		Hiller	19,289	25–28–3	53
57	February 19	Vancouver	2–5	Calgary		Hiller	19,289	26–28–3	55
58	February 21	Calgary	2–5	Anaheim		Hiller	17,174	26–29–3	55
59	February 23	Calgary	1–2	Los Angeles		Ortio	18,230	26–30–3	55
60	February 25	NY Islanders	2–1	Calgary	OT	Ortio	19,289	26–30–4	56
61	February 27	Ottawa	6–4	Calgary		Ortio	19,289	26–31–4	56
62	February 29	Calgary	3–5	Philadelphia		Hiller	19,065	26–32–4	56

March: 6–8–2 (Home: 3–2–2; Road: 3–6–0)
#	Date	Visitor	Score	Home	OT	Decision	Attendance	Record	Pts	Recap
63	March 1	Calgary	1–2	Boston		Ortio	17,565	26–33–4	56
64	March 3	Calgary	3–6	Buffalo		Hiller	18,651	26–34–4	56
65	March 5	Calgary	4–2	Pittsburgh		Ortio	18,663	27–34–4	58
66	March 7	San Jose	2–1	Calgary	OT	Ortio	18,740	27–34–5	59
67	March 9	Nashville	2–3	Calgary	OT	Ortio	19,289	28–34–5	61
68	March 11	Arizona	4–1	Calgary		Ortio	19,289	28–35–5	61
69	March 14	St. Louis	4–7	Calgary		Ortio	19,107	29–35–5	63
70	March 16	Winnipeg	1–4	Calgary		Ortio	18,929	30–35–5	65
71	March 18	Colorado	4–3	Calgary	SO	Ortio	19,289	30–35–6	66
72	March 20	Calgary	4–1	Montreal		Backstrom	21,288	31–35–6	68
73	March 21	Calgary	2–5	Toronto		Hiller	19,069	31–36–6	68
74	March 24	Calgary	2–6	Minnesota		Backstrom	19,032	31–37–6	68
75	March 26	Chicago	4–1	Calgary		Ortio	19,289	31–38–6	68
76	March 28	Calgary	5–2	Arizona		Ortio	14,347	32–38–6	70
77	March 30	Calgary	3–8	Anaheim		Hiller	16,004	32–39–6	70
78	March 31	Calgary	0–3	Los Angeles		Ortio	18,417	32–40–6	70

April: 3–0–1 (Home: 1–0–1; Road: 2–0–0)
#	Date	Visitor	Score	Home	OT	Decision	Attendance	Record	Pts	Recap
79	April 2	Calgary	5–0	Edmonton		Ortio	16,839	33–40–6	72
80	April 5	Los Angeles	5–4	Calgary	OT	Ortio	18,438	33–40–7	73
81	April 7	Vancouver	3–7	Calgary		Ortio	19,289	34–40–7	75
82	April 9	Calgary	2–1	Minnesota		Backstrom	19,247	35–40–7	77

Legend: Win (2 points) Loss (0 points) Overtime/shootout loss (1 point)

== Player statistics ==
=== Skaters ===
Regular season
Player	GP	G	A	Pts	+/−	PIM
Johnny Gaudreau	79	30	48	78	4	20
Sean Monahan	81	27	36	63	−6	18
Mark Giordano	82	21	35	56	−5	54
Mikael Backlund	82	21	26	47	10	28
T. J. Brodie	70	6	39	45	4	18
Joe Colborne	73	19	25	44	−9	27
Dougie Hamilton	82	12	31	43	−14	46
Sam Bennett	77	18	18	36	−11	37
Jiri Hudler^{‡}	53	10	25	35	−1	17
Michael Frolik	64	15	17	32	1	24
Dennis Wideman	51	2	17	19	−9	30
Micheal Ferland	71	4	14	18	−15	45
Matt Stajan	80	6	11	17	−4	52
David Jones^{‡}	59	9	6	15	−8	10
Kris Russell^{‡}	51	4	11	15	−4	8
Josh Jooris	59	4	9	13	−1	39
Deryk Engelland	69	3	9	12	7	54
Markus Granlund^{‡}	31	4	3	7	−1	8
Lance Bouma	44	2	5	7	−6	31
Jyrki Jokipakka^{†}	18	0	6	6	3	8
Mason Raymond	29	4	1	5	−3	8
Jakub Nakladal	27	2	3	5	−5	6
Brandon Bollig	54	2	2	4	−10	103
Hunter Shinkaruk	7	2	1	3	−4	2
Garnet Hathaway	14	0	3	3	−1	31
Freddie Hamilton	4	1	1	2	1	0
Patrick Sieloff	1	1	0	1	1	2
Derek Grant	15	0	1	1	−7	2
Drew Shore	2	0	1	1	0	2
Tyler Wotherspoon	11	0	1	1	0	0
Turner Elson	1	0	1	1	1	0
Ladislav Smid	22	0	0	0	−7	6
Kenny Agostino	2	0	0	0	−2	0
Brett Kulak	8	0	0	0	−2	0
Emile Poirier	2	0	0	0	−1	2
Oliver Kylington	1	0	0	0	0	0

=== Goaltenders ===
Regular season
Player	GP	GS	TOI	W	L	OT	GA	GAA	SA	SV%	SO	G	A	PIM
Karri Ramo	37	37	2144:38	17	18	1	94	2.63	1034	.909	1	0	1	0
Jonas Hiller	26	23	1351:08	9	11	1	79	3.51	654	.879	1	0	0	0
Joni Ortio	22	19	1197:17	7	9	5	55	2.76	564	.902	1	0	0	2
Niklas Backstrom	4	3	233	2	2	0	13	3.35	109	.881	0	0	0	0

^{†}Denotes player spent time with another organization before joining Flames. Stats reflect time with the Flames only.
^{‡}Traded mid-season. Stats reflect time with the Flames only.

== Awards and honours ==
=== Awards ===
Player	Award	Awarded	Ref.
Johnny Gaudreau	NHL First Star of the Week (Dec. 21–27)	December 28, 2015	
Johnny Gaudreau	NHL First Star of the Month (December)	January 4, 2016	
Johnny Gaudreau	NHL All-Star game selection	January 6, 2016	
Mark Giordano	NHL All-Star game selection	January 6, 2016	
Sam Bennett	NHL Second Star of the Week (Jan. 11–17)	January 18, 2016	
Sean Monahan	NHL Third Star of the Week (Mar. 14–20)	March 21, 2016	

=== Milestones ===
Player	Milestone	Reached	Ref
Sean Monahan	100th NHL point	October 23, 2015	
Johnny Gaudreau	100th NHL game	November 15, 2015	
David Jones	100th NHL goal	November 17, 2015	
Johnny Gaudreau	100th NHL point	December 22, 2015	
Sam Bennett	1st NHL hat trick	January 13, 2016	
Dougie Hamilton	100th NHL point	January 13, 2016	
Jakub Nakladal	1st NHL game	February 9, 2016	
Jakub Nakladal	1st NHL point (assist)	February 19, 2016	
Josh Jooris	100th NHL game	February 23, 2016	
Garnet Hathaway	1st NHL game	February 29, 2016	
Jakub Nakladal	1st NHL goal	March 1, 2016	
Garnet Hathaway	1st NHL point (assist)	March 3, 2016	
Jyrki Jokipakka	100th NHL game	March 18, 2016	
Hunter Shinkaruk	1st NHL point (assist)	March 28, 2016	
Hunter Shinkaruk	1st NHL goal	March 30, 2016	
Mikael Backlund	1st NHL hat trick	April 7, 2016	
Patrick Sieloff	1st NHL game 1st NHL goal	April 9, 2016	
Turner Elson	1st NHL game 1st NHL point (assist)	April 9, 2016	
Oliver Kylington	1st NHL game	April 9, 2016	
Brett Kulak	1st NHL game	April 11, 2016	

== Transactions ==
=== Player signings ===
Date	Player	Contract terms (in U.S. dollars)	Ref
June 30, 2015	Dougie Hamilton	6-years, $34.5 million	
July 1, 2015	Karri Ramo	1-year, $3.8 million	
July 15, 2015	Oliver Kylington	Entry level	
July 15, 2015	Bryce Van Brabant	1-year, $874,125	
July 15, 2015	Bill Arnold	1-year, $824,250	
July 15, 2015	Drew Shore	1-year, $850,500	
July 15, 2015	Kenny Agostino	1-year, $735,000	
July 23, 2015	Lance Bouma	3-years, $6.6 million	
July 24, 2015	Josh Jooris	1-year, $975,000	
July 24, 2015	Turner Elson	1-year, $605,000	
July 26, 2015	Paul Byron	1-year, $900,000	
August 25, 2015	Mark Giordano	6-years, $40.5 million	
September 10, 2015	Micheal Ferland	2-years, $1.65 million	
September 23, 2015	Nick Schneider	3-years, entry-level contract	

=== Trades ===
Date	Details		Ref
June 26, 2015	To Calgary Flames Dougie Hamilton (rights)	To Boston Bruins 1st-round pick in 2015; 2nd-round pick in 2015; WSH's 2nd-round pick in 2015
June 27, 2015	To Calgary Flames TBL's 2nd-round pick in 2015	To Arizona Coyotes 3rd-round pick in 2015; WSH's 3rd-round pick in 2015
July 1, 2015	To Calgary Flames Conditional 4th-round pick in 2016	To Nashville Predators Max Reinhart
October 4, 2015	To Calgary Flames Freddie Hamilton	To Colorado Avalanche Conditional 7th-round pick in 2016
November 12, 2015	To Calgary Flames Kevin Poulin	To Tampa Bay Lightning Future Considerations
February 22, 2016	To Calgary Flames Hunter Shinkaruk	To Vancouver Canucks Markus Granlund
February 27, 2016	To Calgary Flames 2nd-round pick in 2016; 4th-round pick in 2018	To Florida Panthers Jiri Hudler
February 29, 2016	To Calgary Flames Jyrki Jokipakka; Brett Pollock; Conditional 2nd-round pick in 2016	To Dallas Stars Kris Russell
February 29, 2016	To Calgary Flames Niklas Backstrom; 6th-round pick in 2016	To Minnesota Wild David Jones

=== Additions and subtractions ===
Additions
Date	Player	Former team	Via	Contract terms	Ref
July 1, 2015	Michael Frolik	Winnipeg Jets	Free agency	5 years, $21.5 million	
July 1, 2015	Derek Grant	Ottawa Senators	Free agency	1 year, $700,000 (two way)	

Subtractions
Date	Player	New team	Via	Ref
July 1, 2015	Raphael Diaz	New York Rangers	Free agency	
July 2, 2015	Mark Cundari	San Jose Sharks	Free agency	
July 3, 2015	John Ramage	Columbus Blue Jackets	Free agency	
July 3, 2015	Brian McGrattan	Anaheim Ducks	Free agency	
July 17, 2015	David Wolf	Hamburg Freezers (DEL)	Free agency	
September 10, 2015	David Schlemko	New Jersey Devils	Free agency	
October 6, 2015	Paul Byron	Montreal Canadiens	Waivers	

== Draft picks ==
Below are the Calgary Flames' selections at the 2015 NHL entry draft, to be held on June 26–27, 2015 at the BB&T Center in Sunrise, Florida.

Rnd	Pick	Player	Nationality	Pos	Team (league)
2	53^{[a]}	Rasmus Andersson	Sweden	D	Barrie Colts (OHL)
2	60^{[b]}	Oliver Kylington	Sweden	D	AIK IF (HockeyAllsvenskan)
5	136	Pavel Karnaukhov	Belarus	LW	Calgary Hitmen (WHL)
6	166	Andrew Mangiapane	Canada	LW	Barrie Colts (OHL)
7	196	Riley Bruce	Canada	D	North Bay Battalion (OHL)

- The Calgary Flames' first-round pick went to the Boston Bruins as the result of a trade on June 26, 2015, that sent Dougie Hamilton to Calgary in exchange for Calgary and Washington's second-round picks in 2015 (45th and 52nd overall) and this pick.
- The Calgary Flames' second-round pick went to the Boston Bruins as the result of a trade on June 26, 2015, that sent Dougie Hamilton to Calgary in exchange for a first-round pick in 2015 (15th overall), Washington's second-round pick in 2015 (52nd overall) and this pick.
- ^{[a]} The Vancouver Canucks' second-round pick went to the Calgary Flames as the result of a trade on March 2, 2015, that sent Sven Baertschi to Vancouver in exchange for this pick.
- ^{[b]} The Tampa Bay Lightning's second-round pick went to the Calgary Flames as the result of a trade on June 27, 2015, that sent Calgary and Washington's third-round picks both in 2015 (76th and 83rd overall) to Arizona in exchange for this pick. Arizona previously acquired this pick, as the result of a trade on March 1, 2015 that sent Keith Yandle, Chris Summers and a fourth-round pick in 2016 to New York in exchange for John Moore, Anthony Duclair, a conditional first-round pick in 2016 and this pick. The Rangers previously acquired this pick as the result of a trade March 5, 2014, that sent Ryan Callahan, a conditional first-round pick in 2014, a first-round pick in 2015, and a conditional seventh-round pick in 2015 to Tampa Bay in exchange for Martin St. Louis and this pick (being conditional at the time of the trade). The condition – the Rangers will receive a second-round pick in 2015 if Callahan is re-signed by Tampa Bay for the 2014–15 NHL season – was converted on June 25, 2014, when Tampa Bay signed Callahan to a six-year contract.
- The Calgary Flames' third-round pick went to the Arizona Coyotes as the result of a trade on June 27, 2015, that sent Tampa Bay's second-round pick in 2015 (60th overall) to Calgary in exchange for Washington's third-round pick in 2015 (83rd overall) and this pick.
- The Calgary Flames' fourth-round pick went to the San Jose Sharks as the result of a trade on July 2, 2013, that sent TJ Galiardi to Calgary in exchange for this pick.
