= 2015–16 Arizona Coyotes season =

NHL hockey team season

2015–16 Arizona Coyotes
- Division: 4th Pacific
- Conference: 10th Western
- 2015–16 record: 35–39–8
- Home record: 22–15–4
- Road record: 13–24–4
- Goals for: 209
- Goals against: 245

Team information
- General manager: Don Maloney
- Coach: Dave Tippett
- Captain: Shane Doan
- Alternate captains: Oliver Ekman-Larsson; Martin Hanzal
- Arena: Gila River Arena
- Minor league affiliates: Tucson Roadrunners (AHL); Rapid City Rush (ECHL)

Team leaders
- Goals: Shane Doan (28)
- Assists: Max Domi; Oliver Ekman-Larsson (34)
- Points: Oliver Ekman-Larsson (55)
- Penalty minutes: Shane Doan (99)
- Plus/minus: Anthony Duclair (+12)
- Wins: Louis Domingue; Mike Smith (15)
- Goals against average: Mike Smith (2.63)

The 2015–16 Arizona Coyotes season was the 37th season for the National Hockey League (NHL) franchise that was established on June 22, 1979, the 20th season since the franchise relocated from Winnipeg following the 1995–96 NHL season, and the 44th overall, including the World Hockey Association years.

The season began its regular games on October 9, 2015 against the Los Angeles Kings.

Despite being unable to play since 2011 following career-ending injuries, the Coyotes acquired Chris Pronger's contract from the Philadelphia Flyers in a trade that sent Pronger and Nicklas Grossmann to Phoenix in exchange for Sam Gagner and a conditional pick.

== Standings ==
Pacific Division
Pos	Team	GP	W	L	OTL	ROW	GF	GA	GD	Pts
1	y – Anaheim Ducks	82	46	25	11	43	218	192	+26	103
2	x – Los Angeles Kings	82	48	28	6	46	225	195	+30	102
3	x – San Jose Sharks	82	46	30	6	42	241	210	+31	98
4	Arizona Coyotes	82	35	39	8	34	209	245	−36	78
5	Calgary Flames	82	35	40	7	33	231	260	−29	77
6	Vancouver Canucks	82	31	38	13	26	191	243	−52	75
7	Edmonton Oilers	82	31	43	8	27	203	245	−42	70

Source: National Hockey League
x – Clinched playoff spot; y – Clinched division

Western Conference Wild Card
Pos	Div	Team	GP	W	L	OTL	ROW	GF	GA	GD	Pts
1	CE	x – Nashville Predators	82	41	27	14	37	228	215	+13	96
2	CE	x – Minnesota Wild	82	38	33	11	35	216	206	+10	87
3	CE	Colorado Avalanche	82	39	39	4	35	216	240	−24	82
4	PA	Arizona Coyotes	82	35	39	8	34	209	245	−36	78
5	CE	Winnipeg Jets	82	35	39	8	32	215	239	−24	78
6	PA	Calgary Flames	82	35	40	7	33	231	260	−29	77
7	PA	Vancouver Canucks	82	31	38	13	26	191	243	−52	75
8	PA	Edmonton Oilers	82	31	43	8	27	203	245	−42	70

Source: National Hockey League
x – Clinched playoff spot

== Schedule and results ==
=== Pre-season ===
Preseason game log: 0–5–1 (Home: 0–2–0; Road: 0–3–1)
#	Date	Visitor	Score	Home	OT	Decision	Attendance	Record	Recap
1^{[a]}	September 21	Los Angeles	5–1	Arizona		Lindback	––	0–1–0
2	September 22	Arizona	2–3	Los Angeles	OT	Treutle	12,996	0–1–1
3	September 25	Arizona	1–4	San Jose		Lindback	14,048	0–2–1
4	September 28	Arizona	0–1	Vancouver		Smith	––	0–3–1
5	September 29	Arizona	0–4	Edmonton		Lindback	16,839	0–4–1
6	October 2	San Jose	3–0	Arizona		Smith	9,530	0–5–1
Notes:^{a} Game was played in at Rabobank Arena in Bakersfield, California.

=== Regular season ===
Game log

October: 5–5–1 (Home: 1–3–0; Road: 4–2–1)
#	Date	Visitor	Score	Home	OT	Decision	Attendance	Record	Pts	Recap
1	October 9	Arizona	4–1	Los Angeles		Smith	18,230	1–0–0	2
2	October 10	Pittsburgh	1–2	Arizona		Smith	17,125	2–0–0	4
3	October 14	Arizona	4–0	Anaheim		Smith	15,172	3–0–0	6
4	October 15	Minnesota	4–3	Arizona		Smith	12,029	3–1–0	6
5	October 17	Boston	5–3	Arizona		Smith	13,411	3–2–0	6
6	October 20	Arizona	2–3	New Jersey	OT	Smith	12,171	3–2–1	7
7	October 22	Arizona	1–4	NY Rangers		Smith	18,006	3–3–1	7
8	October 24	Arizona	4–1	Ottawa		Lindback	17,270	4–3–1	9
9	October 26	Arizona	4–3	Toronto		Smith	18,944	5–3–1	11
10	October 27	Arizona	0–6	Boston		Smith	17,565	5–4–1	11
11	October 30	Vancouver	4–3	Arizona		Lindback	12,166	5–5–1	11

November: 8–4–0 (Home: 5–1–0; Road: 3–3–0)
#	Date	Visitor	Score	Home	OT	Decision	Attendance	Record	Pts	Recap
12	November 5	Colorado	2–4	Arizona		Smith	10,270	6–5–1	13
13	November 7	NY Rangers	4–1	Arizona		Smith	13,029	6–6–1	13
14	November 9	Arizona	4–3	Anaheim	OT	Lindback	13,864	7–6–1	15
15	November 10	Arizona	3–2	Los Angeles		Smith	18,230	8–6–1	17
16	November 12	Edmonton	1–4	Arizona		Smith	15,545	9–6–1	19
17	November 14	Arizona	2–5	Columbus		Smith	13,702	9–7–1	19
18	November 16	Arizona	2–5	NY Islanders		Lindback	11,841	9–8–1	19
19	November 19	Arizona	3–2	Montreal		Smith	21,288	10–8–1	21
20	November 21	Arizona	2–3	Winnipeg		Lindback	15,294	10–9–1	21
21	November 25	Anaheim	2–4	Arizona		Smith	11,578	11–9–1	23
22	November 27	Calgary	1–2	Arizona	OT	Smith	11,495	12–9–1	25
23	November 28	Ottawa	3–4	Arizona		Lindback	12,727	13–9–1	27

December: 5–7–2 (Home: 4–2–2; Road: 1–5–0)
#	Date	Visitor	Score	Home	OT	Decision	Attendance	Record	Pts	Recap
24	December 1	Arizona	2–5	Nashville		Smith	15,091	13–10–1	27
25	December 3	Arizona	1–5	Detroit		Smith	20,027	13–11–1	27
26	December 4	Arizona	2–5	Buffalo		Smith	18,204	13–12–1	27
27	December 6	Arizona	4–5	Carolina		Lindback	9,021	13–13–1	27
28	December 8	Arizona	1–4	St. Louis		Smith	16,301	13–14–1	27
29	December 11	Minnesota	1–2	Arizona	OT	Lindback	14,404	14–14–1	29
30	December 12	Carolina	5–4	Arizona	OT	Lindback	12,668	14–14–2	30
31	December 17	Columbus	7–5	Arizona		Lindback	11,120	14–15–2	30
32	December 19	NY Islanders	0–1	Arizona		Domingue	11,878	15–15–2	32
33	December 22	Toronto	2–3	Arizona		Domingue	12,234	16–15–2	34
34	December 26	Los Angeles	4–3	Arizona	OT	Domingue	15,277	16–15–3	35
35	December 27	Arizona	2–1	Colorado	OT	Lindback	18,064	17–15–3	37
36	December 29	Chicago	7–5	Arizona		Domingue	17,197	17–16–3	37
37	December 31	Winnipeg	2–4	Arizona		Domingue	14,027	18–16–3	39

January: 6–4–2 (Home: 3–3–1; Road: 3–1–1)
#	Date	Visitor	Score	Home	OT	Decision	Attendance	Record	Pts	Recap
38	January 2	Arizona	3–4	Edmonton	SO	Domingue	16,839	18–16–4	40
39	January 4	Arizona	3–2	Vancouver		Domingue	18,377	19–16–4	42
40	January 7	Arizona	2–1	Calgary		Domingue	19,272	20–16–4	44
41	January 9	Nashville	0–4	Arizona		Domingue	12,345	21–16–4	46
42	January 12	Edmonton	3–4	Arizona	OT	Domingue	11,391	22–16–4	48
43	January 14	Detroit	3–2	Arizona	OT	Domingue	12,014	22–16–5	49
44	January 16	New Jersey	2–0	Arizona		Lindback	11,745	22–17–5	49
45	January 18	Buffalo	2–1	Arizona		Domingue	11,134	22–18–5	49
46	January 21	San Jose	3–1	Arizona		Domingue	12,251	22–19–5	49
47	January 23	Los Angeles	2–3	Arizona		Domingue	14,195	23–19–5	51
48	January 25	Arizona	2–1	Minnesota	SO	Domingue	19,020	24–19–5	53
49	January 26	Arizona	2–5	Winnipeg		Domingue	15,294	24–20–5	53

February: 3–10–1 (Home: 3–3–1; Road: 0–7–0)
#	Date	Visitor	Score	Home	OT	Decision	Attendance	Record	Pts	Recap
50	February 2	Los Angeles	6–2	Arizona		Domingue	12,261	24–21–5	53
51	February 4	Chicago	5–4	Arizona	OT	Domingue	17,125	24–21–6	54
52	February 5	Arizona	2–5	Anaheim		Lindback	17,342	24–22–6	54
53	February 10	Vancouver	2–1	Arizona		Domingue	14,436	24–23–6	54
54	February 12	Calgary	1–4	Arizona		Domingue	13,643	25–23–6	56
55	February 13	Arizona	1–4	San Jose		Domingue	17,562	25–24–6	56
56	February 15	Montreal	2–6	Arizona		Domingue	14,338	26–24–6	58
57	February 18	Dallas	3–6	Arizona		Domingue	13,165	27–24–6	60
58	February 20	St. Louis	6–4	Arizona		Domingue	15,839	27–25–6	60
59	February 22	Arizona	2–3	Washington		Domingue	18,506	27–26–6	60
60	February 23	Arizona	1–2	Tampa Bay		Domingue	19,092	27–27–6	60
61	February 25	Arizona	2–3	Florida		Domingue	13,134	27–28–6	60
62	February 27	Arizona	2–4	Philadelphia		Domingue	19,773	27–29–6	60
63	February 29	Arizona	0–6	Pittsburgh		Domingue	18,435	27–30–6	60

March: 7–6–1 (Home: 5–3–0; Road: 2–3–1)
#	Date	Visitor	Score	Home	OT	Decision	Attendance	Record	Pts	Recap
64	March 3	Anaheim	5–1	Arizona		Treutle	11,999	27–31–6	60
65	March 5	Florida	1–5	Arizona		Domingue	12,361	28–31–6	62
66	March 7	Arizona	1–3	Colorado		Domingue	15,393	28–32–6	62
67	March 9	Arizona	2–3	Vancouver	OT	Domingue	18,374	28–32–7	63
68	March 11	Arizona	4–1	Calgary		Domingue	19,289	29–32–7	65
69	March 12	Arizona	4–0	Edmonton		Smith	16,839	30–32–7	67
70	March 17	San Jose	1–3	Arizona		Smith	13,005	31–32–7	69
71	March 19	Tampa Bay	2–0	Arizona		Domingue	14,183	31–33–7	69
72	March 20	Arizona	0–3	San Jose		Smith	15,756	31–34–7	69
73	March 22	Edmonton	2–4	Arizona		Smith	13,408	32–34–7	71
74	March 24	Dallas	1–3	Arizona		Domingue	11,887	33–34–7	73
75	March 26	Philadelphia	1–2	Arizona		Smith	16,002	34–34–7	75
76	March 28	Calgary	5–2	Arizona		Domingue	14,347	34–35–7	75
77	March 31	Arizona	1–4	Dallas		Smith	18,532	34–36–7	75

April: 1–3–1 (Home: 1–0–0; Road: 0–3–1)
#	Date	Visitor	Score	Home	OT	Decision	Attendance	Record	Pts	Recap
78	April 2	Washington	0–3	Arizona		Smith	17,125	35–36–7	77
79	April 4	Arizona	2–5	St. Louis		Smith	19,465	35–37–7	77
80	April 5	Arizona	2–6	Chicago		Domingue	21,884	35–38–7	77
81	April 7	Arizona	2–3	Nashville	OT	Smith	17,113	35–38–8	78
82	April 9	Arizona	0–1	San Jose		Smith	17,562	35–39–8	78

Legend: Win (2 points) Loss (0 points) Overtime/shootout loss (1 point)

== Player statistics ==
Final stats

Regular season
Player	GP	G	A	Pts	+/−	PIM
Oliver Ekman-Larsson	75	21	34	55	−6	96
Max Domi	81	18	34	52	3	72
Shane Doan	72	28	19	47	4	98
Anthony Duclair	81	20	24	44	12	49
Martin Hanzal	64	13	28	41	−5	77
Mikkel Boedker^{‡}	62	13	26	39	−28	10
Antoine Vermette	76	17	21	38	−14	93
Tobias Rieder	82	14	23	37	−21	10
Michael Stone	75	6	30	36	−10	62
Brad Richardson	82	11	20	31	8	46
Jordan Martinook	81	9	15	24	−9	18
Connor Murphy	78	6	11	17	5	48
Alex Tanguay^{†}	18	4	9	13	5	8
Kyle Chipchura	70	4	8	12	−10	38
Kevin Connauton^{†}	38	4	5	9	−3	39
Klas Dahlbeck	71	2	6	8	−5	28
Nicklas Grossmann	58	3	4	7	−3	24
Zbynek Michalek	70	2	5	7	3	20
Steve Downie	26	3	3	6	1	53
Viktor Tikhonov^{†}	39	3	3	6	−6	14
Stefan Elliott^{‡}	19	2	4	6	−2	4
Boyd Gordon	65	2	2	4	−7	10
Tyler Gaudet	14	1	2	3	−2	0
Dustin Jeffrey^{‡}	7	1	1	2	2	2
Jiri Sekac^{†}	11	0	2	2	−4	10
Laurent Dauphin	8	1	0	1	0	4
Craig Cunningham	10	0	1	1	−1	2
Sergei Plotnikov^{†}	13	0	1	1	0	4
John Scott^{‡}	11	0	1	1	0	25
Joe Vitale	1	0	0	0	1	5
Alex Grant	5	0	0	0	−2	7
Eric Selleck	1	0	0	0	0	5
Philip Samuelsson	4	0	0	0	0	2
Christian Thomas^{†}	1	0	0	0	0	0
Jarred Tinordi^{†}	7	0	0	0	−2	12

Goaltenders

Regular season
Player	GP	GS	TOI	W	L	OT	GA	GAA	SA	SV%	SO	G	A	PIM
Louis Domingue	39	36	2,206	15	18	5	101	2.75	1142	0.912	2	0	1	0
Mike Smith	32	32	1,754	15	13	2	77	2.63	921	0.916	3	0	1	2
Anders Lindback	19	13	906:08	5	7	1	47	3.11	443	0.894	0	0	1	0
Niklas Treutle	2	1	50	0	1	0	5	6.00	20	.750	0	0	0	2

^{†}Denotes player spent time with another team before joining the Coyotes. Stats reflect time with the Coyotes only.
^{‡}Traded mid-season
Bold/italics denotes franchise record

== Awards and honours ==
=== Awards ===
Regular season
Player	Award	Awarded
M. Smith	NHL Third Star of the Week	October 12, 2015
J. Scott	NHL All-Star game captain	January 2, 2016
S. Doan	NHL Second Star of the Week	January 4, 2016
L. Domingue	NHL Rookie of the Month	February 1, 2016

=== Milestones ===
Regular season
Player	Milestone	Reached
M. Domi	1st career NHL game 1st career NHL assist 1st career NHL goal 1st career NHL point	October 9, 2015
J. Martinook	1st career NHL goal	October 10, 2015
A. Duclair	1st career NHL hat-trick	October 14, 2015
S. Doan	900th career NHL point	October 17, 2015
O. Ekman-Larsson	100th career NHL assist	October 17, 2015
S. Doan	1,400th career NHL game	October 20, 2015
M. Hanzal	500th career NHL game	October 22, 2015
M. Smith	400th career NHL game	November 10, 2015
M. Boedker	400th career NHL game	November 14, 2015
K. Chipchura	100th career NHL point	December 1, 2015
T. Rieder	100th career NHL game	December 8, 2015
L. Domingue	1st career NHL shutout	December 19, 2015

== Transactions ==
The Coyotes have been involved in the following transactions during the 2015–16 season.

=== Trades ===
Date	Details		Ref
June 27, 2015	To Philadelphia Flyers Sam Gagner; Conditional 4th-round pick in 2016	To Arizona Coyotes Nicklas Grossmann injured contract of Chris Pronger
June 27, 2015	To Calgary Flames NYR's 2nd-round pick in 2015	To Arizona Coyotes 3rd-round pick in 2015; WSH's 3rd-round pick in 2015
June 30, 2015	To Edmonton Oilers Lauri Korpikoski	To Arizona Coyotes Boyd Gordon
September 9, 2015	To Colorado Avalanche Brandon Gormley	To Arizona Coyotes Stefan Elliott
December 15, 2015	To Montreal Canadiens Lucas Lessio	To Arizona Coyotes Christian Thomas
January 15, 2016	To Nashville Predators Stefan Elliott	To Arizona Coyotes Victor Bartley
January 15, 2016	To Montreal Canadiens Victor Bartley; John Scott	To Arizona Coyotes Jarred Tinordi; Stefan Fournier
February 29, 2016	To Pittsburgh Penguins Matthias Plachta conditional 7th-round pick in 2017	To Arizona Coyotes Sergei Plotnikov
February 29, 2016	To Colorado Avalanche Mikkel Boedker	To Arizona Coyotes Alex Tanguay; Conner Bleackley; Kyle Wood
February 29, 2016	To Nashville Predators Corey Potter	To Arizona Coyotes Future Considerations
February 29, 2016	To Pittsburgh Penguins Dustin Jeffrey; Dan O'Donoghue; James Melindy	To Arizona Coyotes Matia Marcantuoni
June 16, 2016	To Dallas Stars 5th-round pick in 2016	To Arizona Coyotes Alex Goligoski (negotiating rights)
June 20, 2016	To San Jose Sharks Maxim Letunov; 6th-round pick in 2017	To Arizona Coyotes 4th-round pick in 2016; DET's 3rd-round pick in 2017

=== Free agents acquired ===
Date	Player	Former team	Contract terms (in U.S. dollars)	Ref
July 1, 2015	Brad Richardson	Vancouver Canucks	3 years, $6.25 million	
July 1, 2015	Zbynek Michalek	St. Louis Blues	2 years, $6.4 million	
July 1, 2015	Anders Lindback	Buffalo Sabres	1 years, $875,000	
July 1, 2015	Steve Downie	Pittsburgh Penguins	1 year, $1.75 million	
July 1, 2015	Dakota Mermis	Oshawa Generals	3 years, entry-level contract	
July 1, 2015	Dustin Jeffrey	Bridgeport Sound Tigers	3 years, entry-level contract	
July 1, 2015	Antoine Vermette	Chicago Blackhawks	2 years, $7.5 million	
July 2, 2015	Alex Grant	Binghamton Senators	1 year, $600,000*	
July 3, 2015	Eric Selleck	Portland Pirates	1 year, $575,000*	
July 3, 2015	Derek Smith	ZSC Lions	1 year, $650,000*	
July 10, 2015	John Scott	San Jose Sharks	1 year, $575,000	
July 29, 2015	Niklas Treutle	EHC Munchen	1 year, entry-level contract	
October 2, 2015	Corey Potter	Calgary Flames	1 year, $650,000	

=== Free agents lost ===
Date	Player	New team	Contract terms (in U.S. dollars)	Ref
July 1, 2015	Mike McKenna	Florida Panthers	2 years, $1.15 million	
July 1, 2015	Mark Arcobello	Toronto Maple Leafs	1 year, $1.1 million	
July 1, 2015	John Moore	New Jersey Devils	3 years, $5 million	
July 7, 2015	Justin Hodgman	St. Louis Blues	1 year, $575,000	
July 21, 2015	Tye McGinn	Tampa Bay Lightning	1 year, $660,000	
September 17, 2015	Martin Erat	Avangard Omsk	undisclosed	
September 29, 2015	Andrew Campbell	Toronto Maple Leafs	2 years, $1.15 million	

=== Claimed via waivers ===
Player	Former team	Date claimed off waivers	Ref
Viktor Tikhonov	Chicago Blackhawks	December 6, 2015	
Kevin Connauton	Columbus Blue Jackets	January 13, 2016	
Jiri Sekac	Chicago Blackhawks	February 27, 2016	

=== Lost via waivers ===
Player	New team	Date claimed off waivers	Ref

=== Player signings ===
The following players were signed by the Coyotes. Two-way contracts are marked with an asterisk (*).

Date	Player	Contract terms (in U.S. dollars)	Ref
June 30, 2015	Craig Cunningham	1 year, $600,000*	
July 1, 2015	Dylan Reese	1 year, $575,000*	
July 6, 2015	Dylan Strome	3 years, entry-level contract*	
July 7, 2015	Mikkel Boedker	1 year, $3.75 million	
July 15, 2015	Philip Samuelsson	1 year, $600,000*	
July 15, 2015	Brendan Shinnimin	1 year, $600,000*	
July 20, 2015	Klas Dahlbeck	1 year, $605,000*	
July 20, 2015	Jordan Martinook	1 year, $600,000*	
July 23, 2015	Michael Bunting	3 years, entry-level contract*	
September 3, 2015	Nick Merkley	3 years, entry-level contract*	
September 5, 2015	Louis Domingue	1 year, $605,000	
December 23, 2015	Conor Garland	3 years, entry-level contract*	
December 26, 2015	Dysin Mayo	3 years, entry-level contract*	
March 30, 2016	Kyle Wood	3 years, entry-level contract*	
April 5, 2016	Adin Hill	3 years, entry-level contract*	
June 17, 2016	Craig Cunningham	1 year*	
June 22, 2016	Alex Goligoski	5 years, $27.375 million	

== Draft picks ==
Below are the Arizona Coyotes' selections at the 2015 NHL entry draft, to be held on June 26–27, 2015 at the BB&T Center in Sunrise, Florida.

Round	#	Player	Pos	Nationality	College/Junior/Club team (League)
1	3	Dylan Strome	C	Canada	Erie Otters (OHL)
1	30^{[a]}	Nicholas Merkley	RW	Canada	Kelowna Rockets (WHL)
2	32	Christian Fischer	RW	United States	USA U-18 (USHL)
3	63	Kyle Capobianco	D	Canada	Sudbury Wolves (OHL)
3	76^{[b]}	Adin Hill	G	Canada	Portland Winterhawks (WHL)
3	81^{[c]}	Brendan Warren	LW	United States	USA U-18 (USHL)
3	83^{[d]}	Jens Looke	RW	Sweden	Brynäs IF (SHL)
5	123	Conor Garland	RW	United States	Moncton Wildcats (QMJHL)
7	183	Erik Kallgren	G	Sweden	Linköpings HC (SHL)

Draft notes

- ^{a} The Chicago Blackhawks' first-round pick went to the Arizona Coyotes as the result of a trade on February 28, 2015 that sent Antoine Vermette to Chicago in exchange for Klas Dahlbeck and this pick.
- ^{b} The Calgary Flames' third-round pick went to the Arizona Coyotes as the result of a trade on June 27, 2015 that sent a 2015 second-round pick to Calgary in exchange for a 2013 third round pick (from Washington) and this pick.
- ^{c} The Minnesota Wild's third-round pick went to the Arizona Coyotes as the result of a trade on January 14, 2015 that sent Devan Dubnyk to Minnesota in exchange for this pick.
- ^{d} The Washington Capitals' third-round pick went to the Arizona Coyotes as the result of a trade on June 27, 2015 that sent Tampa Bay's second-round pick in 2015 (60th overall) to Calgary in exchange for a third-round pick in 2015 (76th overall) and this pick.

Calgary previously acquired this pick as the result of a trade on March 1, 2015 that sent Curtis Glencross to Washington in exchange for a second-round pick in 2015 and this pick.

- The Arizona Coyotes' fourth-round pick went to the Carolina Hurricanes as the result of a trade on February 28, 2015 that sent Tim Gleason to Washington in exchange for Jack Hillen and this pick.

Washington previously acquired this pick as the result of a trade on March 4, 2014 that sent Martin Erat and John Mitchell to Phoenix in exchange for Rostislav Klesla, Chris Brown and this pick.

- The Arizona Coyotes' sixth-round pick went to the Tampa Bay Lightning as the result of a trade on June 29, 2014 that sent Sam Gagner and B. J. Crombeen to Arizona in exchange for this pick.
