= 2015–16 Edmonton Oilers season =

NHL team season

2015–16 Edmonton Oilers
- Division: 7th Pacific
- Conference: 14th Western
- 2015–16 record: 31–43–8
- Home record: 19–20–2
- Road record: 12–23–6
- Goals for: 203
- Goals against: 245

Team information
- General manager: Peter Chiarelli
- Coach: Todd McLellan
- Captain: Vacant
- Alternate captains: Jordan Eberle; Andrew Ference; Taylor Hall; Ryan Nugent-Hopkins
- Arena: Rexall Place
- Average attendance: 16,839 (100%)
- Minor league affiliates: Bakersfield Condors (AHL); Norfolk Admirals (ECHL)

Team leaders
- Goals: Taylor Hall (26)
- Assists: Taylor Hall (39)
- Points: Taylor Hall (65)
- Penalty minutes: Zack Kassian (114)
- Plus/minus: Brandon Davidson (+7)
- Wins: Cam Talbot (21)
- Goals against average: Cam Talbot (2.55)

The 2015–16 Edmonton Oilers season was the 37th season for the National Hockey League (NHL) franchise that was established on June 22, 1979, and 44th season, including their play in the World Hockey Association (WHA). The season began its regular games on October 8, 2015, against the St. Louis Blues, and concluded with a home and away series on April 6 and 9, 2016 against the Vancouver Canucks; the Oilers' final home game on April 6 was their final game at Rexall Place, its home arena since 1974. The team moved to the new downtown Rogers Place for the 2016–17 season. The team would missed the playoffs for the tenth year in a row for the first time in franchise history.

== Standings ==
Pacific Division
Pos	Team	GP	W	L	OTL	ROW	GF	GA	GD	Pts
1	y – Anaheim Ducks	82	46	25	11	43	218	192	+26	103
2	x – Los Angeles Kings	82	48	28	6	46	225	195	+30	102
3	x – San Jose Sharks	82	46	30	6	42	241	210	+31	98
4	Arizona Coyotes	82	35	39	8	34	209	245	−36	78
5	Calgary Flames	82	35	40	7	33	231	260	−29	77
6	Vancouver Canucks	82	31	38	13	26	191	243	−52	75
7	Edmonton Oilers	82	31	43	8	27	203	245	−42	70

Source: National Hockey League
x – Clinched playoff spot; y – Clinched division

Western Conference Wild Card
Pos	Div	Team	GP	W	L	OTL	ROW	GF	GA	GD	Pts
1	CE	x – Nashville Predators	82	41	27	14	37	228	215	+13	96
2	CE	x – Minnesota Wild	82	38	33	11	35	216	206	+10	87
3	CE	Colorado Avalanche	82	39	39	4	35	216	240	−24	82
4	PA	Arizona Coyotes	82	35	39	8	34	209	245	−36	78
5	CE	Winnipeg Jets	82	35	39	8	32	215	239	−24	78
6	PA	Calgary Flames	82	35	40	7	33	231	260	−29	77
7	PA	Vancouver Canucks	82	31	38	13	26	191	243	−52	75
8	PA	Edmonton Oilers	82	31	43	8	27	203	245	−42	70

Source: National Hockey League
x – Clinched playoff spot

== Schedule and results ==
=== Pre-season ===
The Oilers finished 1st in the West for the preseason; the Red Wings finished first in the East.

2015 Edmonton Oilers Pre-season game log

Rookie Games: 3–0–1
#	Date	Visitor	Score	Home	OT	Decision	Attendance	Record	Recap
1^{[a]}	September 11	Vancouver Canucks	2–8	Edmonton Oilers		Laurikainen	5,500	1–0–0
2^{[a]}	September 12	Calgary Flames	6–3	Edmonton Oilers		Papirny	4,888	2–0–0
3^{[a]}	September 14	Edmonton Oilers	4–5	Winnipeg Jets	OT	Laurikainen	4,810	2–0–1
4	September 16	University of Alberta Golden Bears	3–6	Edmonton Oilers		Laurikainen	14,434	3–0–1
^{[a]}Rookie Tournament at South Okanagan Events Centre in Penticton, British Columbia.

September/October: 6–1–1 (Home: 3–1–0; Road: 3–0–1)
#	Date	Visitor	Score	Home	OT	Decision	Attendance	Record	Recap
1^{[b]}	September 21	Edmonton	3–1	Calgary		Scrivens	19,159	1–0–0
2^{[b]}	September 21	Calgary	2–4	Edmonton		Brossoit	16,839	2–0–0
3	September 23	Winnipeg	2–3	Edmonton		Talbot	16,839	3–0–0
4	September 25	Edmonton	4–3	Winnipeg	OT	Scrivens	15,294	4–0–0
5^{[c]}	September 26	Edmonton	3–0	Minnesota		Nilsson	10,199	5–0–0
6	September 29	Arizona	0–4	Edmonton		Nilsson	16,839	6–0–0
7	October 1	Vancouver	5–2	Edmonton		Talbot	17,699	6–1–0
8	October 3	Edmonton	2–3	Vancouver	OT	Talbot	18,379	6–1–1
Notes:^{b} Split-squad.^{c} Game was played at SaskTel Centre in Saskatoon, Saskatchewan.

=== Regular season ===
2015–16 Edmonton Oilers Game Log

October: 4–8–0 (Home: 2–4–0; Road: 2–4–0)
#	Date	Visitor	Score	Home	OT	Decision	Attendance	Record	Pts	Recap
1	October 8	Edmonton	1–3	St. Louis		Talbot	19,327	0–1–0	0
2	October 10	Edmonton	0–2	Nashville		Talbot	17,113	0–2–0	0
3	October 13	Edmonton	2–4	Dallas		Nilsson	16,265	0–3–0	0
4	October 15	St. Louis	4–2	Edmonton		Talbot	16,839	0–4–0	0
5	October 17	Edmonton	5–2	Calgary		Talbot	19,289	1–4–0	2
6	October 18	Edmonton	2–1	Vancouver	OT	Nilsson	18,261	2–4–0	4
7	October 21	Detroit	1–3	Edmonton		Talbot	16,839	3–4–0	6
8	October 23	Washington	7–4	Edmonton		Nilsson	16,839	3–5–0	6
9	October 25	Los Angeles	3–2	Edmonton		Talbot	16,839	3–6–0	6
10	October 27	Edmonton	3–4	Minnesota		Talbot	18,936	3–7–0	6
11	October 29	Montreal	3–4	Edmonton		Talbot	16,839	4–7–0	8
12	October 31	Calgary	5–4	Edmonton		Talbot	16,839	4–8–0	8

November: 4–7–2 (Home: 2–1–1; Road: 2–6-1)
#	Date	Visitor	Score	Home	OT	Decision	Attendance	Record	Pts	Recap
13	November 3	Philadelphia	2–4	Edmonton		Nilsson	16,839	5–8–0	10
14	November 6	Pittsburgh	2–1	Edmonton		Nilsson	16,839	5–9–0	10
15	November 8	Edmonton	2–4	Chicago		Talbot	21,611	5–10–0	10
16	November 11	Edmonton	4–3	Anaheim	OT	Nilsson	16,505	6–10–0	12
17	November 12	Edmonton	1–4	Arizona		Nilsson	15,545	6–11–0	12
18	November 14	Edmonton	3–4	Los Angeles		Talbot	18,230	6–12–0	12
19	November 18	Chicago	4–3	Edmonton	OT	Nilsson	16,839	6–12–1	13
20	November 20	New Jersey	1–5	Edmonton		Nilsson	16,839	7–12–1	15
21	November 23	Edmonton	0–1	Washington		Nilsson	18,506	7–13–1	15
22	November 25	Edmonton	1–4	Carolina		Nilsson	17,757	7–14–1	15
23	November 27	Edmonton	3–4	Detroit	OT	Talbot	20,027	7–14–2	16
24	November 28	Edmonton	3–2	Pittsburgh	SO	Nilsson	18,656	8–14–2	18
25	November 30	Edmonton	0–3	Toronto		Nilsson	19,559	8–15–2	18

December: 7–6–1 (Home: 6–2–0; Road: 1–4–1)
#	Date	Visitor	Score	Home	OT	Decision	Attendance	Record	Pts	Recap
26	December 2	Boston	2–3	Edmonton	SO	Nilsson	16,839	9–15–2	20
27	December 4	Dallas	1–2	Edmonton	OT	Nilsson	16,839	10–15–2	22
28	December 6	Buffalo	2–4	Edmonton		Nilsson	16,839	11–15–2	24
29	December 9	San Jose	3–4	Edmonton	OT	Nilsson	16,839	12–15–2	26
30	December 11	NY Rangers	5–7	Edmonton		Nilsson	16,839	13–15–2	28
31	December 14	Edmonton	3–2	Boston	OT	Talbot	17,565	14–15–2	30
32	December 15	Edmonton	2–4	NY Rangers		Nilsson	18,006	14–16–2	30
33	December 17	Edmonton	0–4	Chicago		Talbot	21,451	14–17–2	30
34	December 19	Edmonton	1–5	Colorado		Nilsson	17,570	14–18–2	30
35	December 21	Winnipeg	1–3	Edmonton		Talbot	16,839	15–18–2	32
36	December 26	Edmonton	1–2	Vancouver	OT	Talbot	18,570	15–18–3	33
37	December 27	Edmonton	3–5	Calgary		Nilsson	19,289	15–19–3	33
38	December 29	Los Angeles	5–2	Edmonton		Talbot	16,839	15–20–3	33
39	December 31	Anaheim	1–0	Edmonton		Talbot	16,839	15–21–3	33

January: 4–5–2 (Home: 3–3–0; Road: 1–2–2)
#	Date	Visitor	Score	Home	OT	Decision	Attendance	Record	Pts	Recap
40	January 2	Arizona	3–4	Edmonton	SO	Talbot	16,839	16–21–3	35
41	January 4	Carolina	0–1	Edmonton	OT	Talbot	16,839	17–21–3	37
42	January 8	Tampa Bay	3–2	Edmonton		Talbot	16,839	17–22–3	37
43	January 10	Florida	2–1	Edmonton		Talbot	16,839	17–23–3	37
44	January 12	Edmonton	3–4	Arizona	OT	Nilsson	11,391	17–23–4	38
45	January 14	Edmonton	1–2	San Jose	SO	Talbot	15,379	17–23–5	39
46	January 16	Calgary	1–2	Edmonton	SO	Talbot	16,839	18–23–5	41
47	January 18	Edmonton	4–2	Florida		Talbot	14,897	19–23–5	43
48	January 19	Edmonton	4–6	Tampa Bay		Nilsson	19,092	19–24–5	43
49	January 21	Edmonton	2–3	Dallas		Talbot	18,532	19–25–5	43
50	January 23	Nashville	4–1	Edmonton		Talbot	16,839	19–26–5	43

February: 4–8–2 (Home: 3–4–1; Road: 1–4–1)
#	Date	Visitor	Score	Home	OT	Decision	Attendance	Record	Pts	Recap
51	February 2	Columbus	1–5	Edmonton		Talbot	16,839	20–26–5	45
52	February 4	Edmonton	7–2	Ottawa		Talbot	18,564	21–26–5	47
53	February 6	Edmonton	1–5	Montreal		Talbot	21,288	21–27–5	47
54	February 7	Edmonton	1–8	NY Islanders		Nilsson	14,030	21–28–5	47
55	February 9	Edmonton	1–2	New Jersey		Talbot	16,514	21–29–5	47
56	February 11	Toronto	2–5	Edmonton		Talbot	16,839	22–29–5	49
57	February 13	Winnipeg	2–1	Edmonton	SO	Brossoit	16,839	22–29–6	50
58	February 16	Anaheim	5–3	Edmonton		Talbot	16,839	22–30–6	50
59	February 18	Minnesota	5–2	Edmonton		Talbot	16,839	22–31–6	50
60	February 20	Colorado	3–2	Edmonton		Talbot	16,839	22–32–6	50
61	February 23	Ottawa	4–1	Edmonton		Talbot	16,839	22–33–6	50
62	February 25	Edmonton	1–2	Los Angeles		Talbot	18,230	22–34–6	50
63	February 26	Edmonton	1–2	Anaheim	OT	Talbot	17,174	22–34–7	51
64	February 28	NY Islanders	1–3	Edmonton		Talbot	16,839	23–34–7	53

March: 7–8–0 (Home: 2–5–0; Road: 5–3–0)
#	Date	Visitor	Score	Home	OT	Decision	Attendance	Record	Pts	Recap
65	March 1	Edmonton	2–1	Buffalo	OT	Talbot	18,467	24–34–7	55
66	March 3	Edmonton	4–0	Philadelphia		Talbot	17,567	25–34–7	57
67	March 4	Edmonton	3–6	Columbus		Brossoit	16,789	25–35–7	57
68	March 6	Edmonton	2–1	Winnipeg		Talbot	15,294	26–35–7	59
69	March 8	San Jose	3–0	Edmonton		Talbot	16,839	26–36–7	59
70	March 10	Edmonton	2–1	Minnesota		Talbot	19,058	27–36–7	61
71	March 12	Arizona	4–0	Edmonton		Talbot	16,839	27–37–7	61
72	March 14	Nashville	3–2	Edmonton		Brossoit	16,839	27–38–7	61
73	March 16	St. Louis	4–6	Edmonton		Talbot	16,839	28–38–7	63
74	March 18	Vancouver	0–2	Edmonton		Talbot	16,839	29–38–7	65
75	March 20	Colorado	3–2	Edmonton		Brossoit	16,893	29–39–7	65
76	March 22	Edmonton	2–4	Arizona		Talbot	13,408	29–40–7	65
77	March 24	Edmonton	6–3	San Jose		Talbot	16,570	30–40–7	67
78	March 26	Edmonton	4–6	Los Angeles		Brossoit	18,230	30–41–7	67
79	March 28	Anaheim	2–1	Edmonton		Talbot	16,839	30–42–7	67

April: 1–1–1 (Home: 1–1–0; Road: 0–0–1)
#	Date	Visitor	Score	Home	OT	Decision	Attendance	Record	Pts	Recap
80	April 2	Calgary	5–0	Edmonton		Talbot	16,839	30–43–7	67
81	April 6	Vancouver	2–6	Edmonton		Talbot	16,839	31–43–7	69
82	April 9	Edmonton	3–4	Vancouver	SO	Talbot	18,570	31–43–8	70

Legend: Win (2 points) Loss (0 points) Overtime/shootout loss (1 point)

== Playoffs ==
The Oilers failed to qualify for the playoffs for the 10th consecutive year.

== Player statistics ==
Final stats

=== Skaters ===
Regular season
Player	GP	G	A	Pts	+/−	PIM
Taylor Hall	82	26	39	65	−4	54
Leon Draisaitl	72	19	32	51	−2	20
Connor McDavid	45	16	32	48	−1	18
Jordan Eberle	69	25	22	47	−12	14
Benoit Pouliot	55	14	22	36	−6	30
Ryan Nugent-Hopkins	55	12	22	34	−9	18
Teddy Purcell^{‡}	61	11	21	32	−9	10
Andrej Sekera	81	6	24	30	−15	12
Mark Letestu	82	10	15	25	−21	10
Nail Yakupov	60	8	15	23	−16	24
Lauri Korpikoski	71	10	12	22	−17	10
Patrick Maroon^{†}	16	8	6	14	6	34
Iiro Pakarinen	63	5	8	13	−10	8
Matt Hendricks	68	5	7	12	2	82
Oscar Klefbom	30	4	8	12	−4	6
Brandon Davidson	51	4	7	11	7	20
Darnell Nurse	69	3	7	10	−13	60
Justin Schultz^{‡}	45	3	7	10	−22	14
Zack Kassian	36	3	5	8	−7	114
Mark Fayne	69	2	5	7	−6	18
Eric Gryba	53	1	5	6	0	75
Adam Clendening^{†}	20	1	5	6	3	10
Jordan Oesterle	17	0	5	5	1	0
Anton Lander	61	1	2	3	−9	18
Adam Pardy^{†}	9	0	3	3	−4	6
Jujhar Khaira	15	0	2	2	−2	13
Luke Gazdic	29	1	0	1	−6	24
Rob Klinkhammer	14	1	0	1	−6	6
Nikita Nikitin	11	0	1	1	−5	8
Griffin Reinhart	29	0	1	1	−6	20
Anton Slepyshev	11	0	1	1	−5	2
Andrew Ference	6	0	0	0	−4	6
Adam Cracknell^{†}	8	0	0	0	−2	6
Brad Hunt	7	0	0	0	−1	2
Andrew Miller	6	0	0	0	−1	0

=== Goaltenders ===
Regular season
Player	GP	GS	TOI	W	L	OT	GA	GAA	SA	SV%	SO	G	A	PIM
Cam Talbot	56	53	3223:52	21	27	5	137	2.55	1648	.917	3	0	1	0
Anders Nilsson^{‡}	26	24	1413:17	10	12	2	74	3.14	745	.901	0	0	1	4
Laurent Brossoit	5	5	299:31	0	4	1	18	3.60	142	.873	0	0	0	0

^{†}Denotes player spent time with another team before joining the Oilers. Stats reflect time with the Oilers only.
^{‡}Traded mid-season. Stats reflect time with the Oilers only.
Bold/italics denotes franchise record

== Awards and honours ==
=== Awards ===
Regular season
Player	Award	Awarded
Taylor Hall	NHL Third Star of the Week	November 2, 2015
Connor McDavid	NHL Rookie of the Month - October	November 2, 2015
Taylor Hall	NHL Second Star of the Week	December 14, 2015
Taylor Hall	NHL All-Star game selection	January 6, 2016
Connor McDavid	NHL Rookie of the Month - February	March 1, 2016
Cam Talbot	NHL First Star of the Week	March 5, 2016
Connor McDavid	NHL Rookie of the Month - March	April 1, 2016

== Milestones ==
Regular season
Player	Milestone	Reached
Taylor Hall	300th NHL Game	October 8, 2015
Connor McDavid	1st NHL Game	October 8, 2015
Anton Slepyshev	1st NHL Game	October 8, 2015
Connor McDavid	1st NHL Goal; 1st NHL Point	October 13, 2015
Benoit Pouliot	100th NHL Assist	October 13, 2015
Connor McDavid	1st NHL Assist	October 17, 2015
Anton Slepyshev	1st NHL Assist; 1st NHL Point	October 23, 2015
Nail Yakupov	200th NHL Game	October 23, 2015
Eric Gryba	200th NHL PIM	October 27, 2015
Darnell Nurse	1st NHL Goal; 1st NHL Point	October 27, 2015
Benoit Pouliot	200th NHL Point	October 27, 2015
Darnell Nurse	1st NHL Assist	October 29, 2015
Andrej Sekera	500th NHL Game	November 6, 2015
Ryan Nugent-Hopkins	200th NHL Point	November 8, 2015
Anders Nilsson	1st NHL Assist	November 11, 2015
Teddy Purcell	500th NHL Game	November 12, 2015
Brandon Davidson	1st NHL Assist	November 18, 2015
Benoit Pouliot	100th NHL Goal	November 25, 2015
Nail Yakupov	100th NHL Point	November 25, 2015
Oscar Klefbom	100th NHL Game	November 27, 2015
Jujhar Khaira	1st NHL Game	November 28, 2015
Jujhar Khaira	1st NHL Assist; 1st NHL Point	December 4, 2015
Taylor Hall	200th NHL PIM	December 9, 2015
Lauri Korpikoski	1st NHL Hat-trick	December 11, 2015
Benoit Pouliot	300th NHL PIM	December 19, 2015
Taylor Hall	300th NHL Point	December 21, 2015
Lauri Korpikoski	500th NHL Game	December 31, 2015
Jordan Eberle	300th NHL Point	January 2, 2016
Eric Gryba	200th NHL Game	January 2, 2016
Ryan Nugent-Hopkins	300th NHL Game	January 10, 2016
Zack Kassian	200th NHL Game	January 16, 2016
Matt Hendricks	600th NHL PIM	January 18, 2016
Justin Schultz	100th NHL Point	January 21, 2016
Jordan Eberle	1st NHL Hat-trick	February 11, 2016
Jordan Eberle	400th NHL Game	February 13, 2016
Teddy Purcell	100th NHL PIM	February 13, 2016
Lauri Korpikoski	100th NHL Assist	February 16, 2016
Cam Talbot	1st NHL Assist; 1st NHL Point	February 26, 2016
Cam Talbot	100th NHL Game	March 1, 2016
Cam Talbot	10th NHL Shutout	March 3, 2016
Jordan Eberle	100th NHL PIM	March 10, 2016
Leon Draisaitl	100th NHL Game	March 16, 2016
Zack Kassian	400th NHL PIM	March 24, 2016
Nail Yakupov	100th NHL PIM	April 2, 2016
Mark Letestu	400th NHL Game	April 9, 2016

== Transactions ==
Following the end of the Oilers' 2014–15 season, and during the 2015–16 season, this team has been involved in the following transactions:

=== Trades ===
Date	Details		Ref
June 26, 2015	To New York Islanders PIT's 1st-round pick in 2015; 2nd-round pick in 2015	To Edmonton Oilers Griffin Reinhart
June 27, 2015	To New York Rangers MTL's 2nd-round pick in 2015; OTT's 3rd-round pick in 2015; 7th-round pick in 2015	To Edmonton Oilers Cam Talbot; 7th-round pick in 2015
June 27, 2015	To Toronto Maple Leafs Martin Marincin	To Edmonton Oilers Brad Ross; PIT's 4th-round pick in 2015
June 27, 2015	To Ottawa Senators Travis Ewanyk; PIT's 4th-round pick in 2015	To Edmonton Oilers Eric Gryba
June 27, 2015	To Tampa Bay Lightning 7th-round pick in 2016	To Edmonton Oilers ANA's 7th-round pick in 2015
June 30, 2015	To Arizona Coyotes Boyd Gordon	To Edmonton Oilers Lauri Korpikoski
July 6, 2015	To Chicago Blackhawks Liam Coughlin	To Edmonton Oilers Anders Nilsson
December 28, 2015	To Montreal Canadiens Ben Scrivens	To Edmonton Oilers Zack Kassian
February 24, 2016	To Vancouver Canucks Philip Larsen	To Edmonton Oilers 5th-round pick in 2017
February 27, 2016	To St. Louis Blues Anders Nilsson	To Edmonton Oilers Niklas Lundstrom; 5th-round pick in 2016
February 27, 2016	To Pittsburgh Penguins Justin Schultz^{[Note 1]}	To Edmonton Oilers 3rd-round pick in 2016
February 27, 2016	To Florida Panthers Teddy Purcell	To Edmonton Oilers 3rd-round pick in 2016
February 29, 2016	To Anaheim Ducks Martin Gernat; 4th-round pick in 2016	To Edmonton Oilers Patrick Maroon^{[Note 2]}

Notes

- ^{Note 1} Edmonton to retain 50% ($1.95 million) of salary as part of trade.
- ^{Note 2} Anaheim to retain 25% ($0.5 million) of salary as part of trade.

=== Free agents acquired ===
Date	Player	Former team	Contract terms (in U.S. dollars)	Ref
July 1, 2015	Andrej Sekera	Los Angeles Kings	6 years, $33 million	
July 1, 2015	Mark Letestu	Columbus Blue Jackets	3 years, $5.4 million	
March 13, 2016	Jere Sallinen	Jokerit (KHL)	1 year, $792,500 entry-level contract	
April 7, 2016	Nick Ellis	Providence Friars (NCAA)	2 years, $1.85 million entry-level contract	
May 7, 2016	Drake Caggiula	University of North Dakota (NCAA)	2 years, $1.85 million entry-level contract	
May 9, 2016	Patrick Russell	St. Cloud State University (NCAA)	2 years, $1.85 million entry-level contract	

=== Free agents lost ===
Date	Player	New team	Contract terms (in U.S. dollars)	Ref
July 1, 2015	Richard Bachman	Vancouver Canucks	2 years, $1.15 million	
July 2, 2015	Matt Fraser	Winnipeg Jets	1 year, $650,000	
July 9, 2015	Viktor Fasth	CSKA Moscow (KHL)	1 year	
August 11, 2015	Marc-Olivier Roy	Bakersfield Condors (AHL)		
September 16, 2015	Jack Combs	Hartford Wolf Pack (AHL)		
September 29, 2015	Kellan Lain	Manitoba Moose (AHL)	1 year	
September 30, 2015	Curtis Hamilton	Sparta Prague (Czech Extraliga)		
October 9, 2015	Derek Roy	SC Bern (NLA)	1 year	
January 3, 2016	Keith Aulie	HIFK Helsinki (Liiga)		
April 29, 2016	Niklas Lundstrom	IF Björklöven (HockeyAllsvenskan)	1 year	

=== Claimed via waivers ===
Player	Former team	Date claimed off waivers	Ref
Adam Clendening	Anaheim Ducks	January 27, 2016	
Adam Cracknell	Vancouver Canucks	February 29, 2016	
Adam Pardy	Winnipeg Jets	February 29, 2016	

=== Lost via waivers ===
Player	New team	Date claimed off waivers	Ref

=== Lost via retirement ===
Player	Ref

=== Player signings ===
Date	Player	Contract terms (in U.S. dollars)	Ref
July 3, 2015	Connor McDavid	3 years, $2.875 million entry-level contract	
July 6, 2015	Anders Nilsson	1 year, $1 million	
July 15, 2015	Justin Schultz	1 year, $3.9 million	
July 16, 2015	Brandon Davidson	1 year, $585,000	
July 16, 2015	Tyler Pitlick	1 year, $761,250	
September 20, 2015	Oscar Klefbom	7 years, $29 million contract extension	
October 5, 2015	Braden Christoffer	3 years, $1.95 million entry-level contract	
January 17, 2016	Cam Talbot	3 years, $12 million contract extension	
February 29, 2016	Laurent Brossoit	2 years, $1.5 million contract extension	
February 29, 2016	Brandon Davidson	2 years, $2.85 million contract extension	
April 7, 2016	Caleb Jones	3 years, $2.115 million entry-level contract	

== Draft picks ==
Below are the Edmonton Oilers' selections at the 2015 NHL entry draft, to be held on June 26–27, 2015 at the BB&T Center in Sunrise, Florida. The Edmonton Oilers won the 2015 draft lottery that took place on April 18, 2015.

Round	#	Player	Pos	Nationality	College/Junior/Club team (League)
1	1	Connor McDavid	Centre	Canada	Erie Otters (OHL)
4	117^{[a]}	Caleb Jones	Defense	United States	USA Hockey National Team Development Program
5	124	Ethan Bear	Defence	Canada	Seattle Thunderbirds (WHL)
6	154	John Marino	Defense	United States	South Shore Kings (USPHL)
7	208^{[b]}	Miroslav Svoboda	Goaltender	Czech Republic	Oceláři Třinec U20 (Jr. A Czech Extraliga)
7	209^{[c]}	Ziyat Paigin	Defence	Russia	Ak Bars Kazan (KHL)

Draft notes

- The Edmonton Oilers' second-round pick went to the Tampa Bay Lightning as the result of a trade on June 26, 2015, that sent the Rangers' first-round pick in 2015 to the New York Islanders in exchange for Florida's third-round pick in 2015 and this pick. The Islanders previously acquired this pick as the result of a trade on June 26, 2015, that sent Griffin Reinhart to Edmonton in exchange for Pittsburgh's first-round pick in 2015 and this pick.
- The Edmonton Oilers' third-round pick went to the Tampa Bay Lightning as the result of a trade on November 28, 2014, that sent Eric Brewer to Anaheim in exchange for this pick. Anaheim previously acquired this pick as the result of a trade on March 4, 2014 that sent Viktor Fasth to Edmonton in exchange for a fifth-round pick in 2014 and this pick.
- The Edmonton Oilers' fourth-round pick went to the St. Louis Blues as the result of a trade on July 10, 2013, that sent David Perron and a third-round pick in 2015 to Edmonton in exchange for Magnus Paajarvi, a second-round pick in 2014 and this pick.
- ^{a} The Montreal Canadiens' fourth-round pick went to the Edmonton Oilers as the result of a trade on March 2, 2015, that sent Jeff Petry to Montreal in exchange for a second-round pick in 2015 and this pick (being conditional at the time of the trade). The condition – Edmonton will receive a fourth-round pick in 2015 if Montreal advances to the second round of the 2015 Stanley Cup playoffs – was converted on April 26, 2015 when Montreal eliminated Ottawa in first-round of the 2015 Stanley Cup playoffs.
- The Edmonton Oilers' seventh-round pick went to the New York Rangers as the result of a trade on June 27, 2015, that sent Cam Talbot and a seventh-round pick in 2015 to Edmonton in exchange for Montreal's second-round pick in 2015, Ottawa's third-round pick in 2015, and this pick.
- ^{b} The Anaheim Ducks' seventh-round pick went to the Edmonton Oilers as the result of a trade on June 27, 2015, that sent Dallas' seventh-round pick in 2016 to Tampa Bay in exchange for this pick.
- ^{c} The New York Rangers' seventh-round pick went to the Edmonton Oilers as the result of a trade on June 27, 2015, that sent Montreal's second-round pick in 2015, Ottawa's third-round pick in 2015, and a seventh-round pick in 2015 to the Rangers in exchange for Cam Talbot and this pick.
