= 2015–16 Anaheim Ducks season =

NHL team season

2015–16 Anaheim Ducks
- Pacific Division champions
- Division: 1st Pacific
- Conference: 4th Western
- 2015–16 record: 46–25–11
- Home record: 25–10–6
- Road record: 21–15–5
- Goals for: 218
- Goals against: 192

Team information
- General manager: Bob Murray
- Coach: Bruce Boudreau
- Captain: Ryan Getzlaf
- Alternate captains: Ryan Kesler; Corey Perry
- Arena: Honda Center
- Minor league affiliates: San Diego Gulls (AHL); Utah Grizzlies (ECHL)

Team leaders
- Goals: Corey Perry (34)
- Assists: Ryan Getzlaf (50)
- Points: Ryan Getzlaf (63)
- Penalty minutes: Kevin Bieksa (99)
- Plus/minus: Ryan Getzlaf (+14)
- Wins: Frederik Andersen (22)
- Goals against average: John Gibson (2.07)

The 2015–16 Anaheim Ducks season was the 23rd season for the National Hockey League (NHL) franchise that was established on June 15, 1993. The team's regular season began on October 10, 2015, against the San Jose Sharks. The Ducks battled back from 1–7–2 and 12–15–6 starts to win 46 games and the Pacific Division, but were dispatched in a home playoff Game 7 for the fourth year in a row, as Nashville bested Anaheim in a hard-fought opening-round series. The first round loss came a season after the Ducks went two rounds further in the playoffs to the Western Conference Finals. The Ducks terminated the employment of head coach Bruce Boudreau two days after the team's elimination.

== Standings ==
Pacific Division
Pos	Team	GP	W	L	OTL	ROW	GF	GA	GD	Pts
1	y – Anaheim Ducks	82	46	25	11	43	218	192	+26	103
2	x – Los Angeles Kings	82	48	28	6	46	225	195	+30	102
3	x – San Jose Sharks	82	46	30	6	42	241	210	+31	98
4	Arizona Coyotes	82	35	39	8	34	209	245	−36	78
5	Calgary Flames	82	35	40	7	33	231	260	−29	77
6	Vancouver Canucks	82	31	38	13	26	191	243	−52	75
7	Edmonton Oilers	82	31	43	8	27	203	245	−42	70

Source: National Hockey League
x – Clinched playoff spot; y – Clinched division

== Schedule and results ==
=== Pre-season ===
2015 preseason game log: 5–0–1 (Home: 3–0–0; Road: 2–0–1)
#	Date	Visitor	Score	Home	OT	Decision	Attendance	Record	Recap
1	September 22	Anaheim	4–5	Colorado	OT	Gibson	—	0–0–1	O1
2	September 25	Los Angeles	1–2	Anaheim		Andersen	16,571	1–0–1	W1
3	September 26	Anaheim	2–1	San Jose		Khudobin	14,722	2–0–1	W2
4	September 29	Anaheim	2–1	Los Angeles	OT	Khudobin	17,915	3–0–1	W3
5	October 1	Colorado	0–3	Anaheim		Gibson	13,756	4–0–1	W4
6	October 3	San Jose	1–5	Anaheim		Andersen	17,174	5–0–1	W5

=== Regular season ===
2015–16 game log

October: 1–7–2 (Home: 1–2–1; Road: 0–5–1)
#	Date	Visitor	Score	Home	OT	Decision	Attendance	Record	Pts	Recap
1	October 10	Anaheim	0–2	San Jose		Andersen	17,562	0–1–0	0	L1
2	October 12	Vancouver	2–1	Anaheim	SO	Andersen	17,174	0–1–1	1	O1
3	October 14	Arizona	4–0	Anaheim		Khudobin	15,172	0–2–1	1	L1
4	October 16	Colorado	3–0	Anaheim		Andersen	17,174	0–3–1	1	L2
5	October 18	Minnesota	1–4	Anaheim		Khudobin	16,784	1–3–1	3	W1
6	October 22	Anaheim	1–5	Nashville		Khudobin	17,113	1–4–1	3	L1
7	October 24	Anaheim	0–3	Minnesota		Andersen	19,034	1–5–1	3	L2
8	October 26	Anaheim	0–1	Chicago	OT	Andersen	21,529	1–5–2	4	O1
9	October 27	Anaheim	3–4	Dallas		Andersen	17,798	1–6–2	4	L1
10	October 29	Anaheim	1–2	St. Louis		Andersen	16,904	1–7–2	4	L2

November: 8–4–3 (Home: 5–1–3; Road: 3–3–0)
#	Date	Visitor	Score	Home	OT	Decision	Attendance	Record	Pts	Recap
11	November 1	Nashville	2–4	Anaheim		Andersen	16,276	2–7–2	6	W1
12	November 4	Florida	2–3	Anaheim	SO	Andersen	15,169	3–7–2	8	W2
13	November 6	Columbus	2–4	Anaheim		Andersen	17,174	4–7–2	10	W3
14	November 7	Anaheim	1–0	San Jose		Khudobin	17,562	5–7–2	12	W4
15	November 9	Arizona	4–3	Anaheim	OT	Andersen	13,864	5–7–3	13	O1
16	November 11	Edmonton	4–3	Anaheim	OT	Andersen	16,505	5–7–4	14	O2
17	November 13	NY Islanders	4–1	Anaheim		Khudobin	17,174	5–8–4	14	L1
18	November 16	Anaheim	4–1	Carolina		Khudobin	9,305	6–8–4	16	W1
19	November 17	Anaheim	2–3	Nashville		Andersen	17,113	6–9–4	16	L1
20	November 19	Anaheim	3–1	Florida		Andersen	10,947	7–9–4	18	W1
21	November 21	Anaheim	0–5	Tampa Bay		Andersen	19,092	7–10–4	18	L1
22	November 24	Calgary	3–5	Anaheim		Gibson	15,688	8–10–4	20	W1
23	November 25	Anaheim	2–4	Arizona		Gibson	11,578	8–11–4	20	L1
24	November 27	Chicago	3–2	Anaheim	OT	Gibson	17,174	8–11–5	21	O1
25	November 30	Vancouver	0–4	Anaheim		Gibson	14,006	9–11–5	23	W1

December: 6–4–1 (Home: 2–2–0; Road: 4–2–1)
#	Date	Visitor	Score	Home	OT	Decision	Attendance	Record	Pts	Recap
26	December 2	Tampa Bay	2–1	Anaheim		Gibson	14,741	9–12–5	23	L1
27	December 4	San Jose	0–1	Anaheim		Gibson	15,701	10–12–5	25	W1
28	December 6	Pittsburgh	1–2	Anaheim		Gibson	15,836	11–12–5	27	W2
29	December 11	Carolina	5–1	Anaheim		Gibson	17,174	11–13–5	27	L1
30	December 17	Anaheim	0–3	Buffalo		Gibson	18,801	11–14–5	27	L2
31	December 19	Anaheim	2–1	New Jersey		Andersen	16,514	12–14–5	29	W1
32	December 21	Anaheim	2–5	NY Islanders		Andersen	13,578	12–15–5	29	L1
33	December 22	Anaheim	2–3	NY Rangers	OT	Gibson	18,006	12–15–6	30	O1
34	December 27	Philadelphia	2–4	Anaheim		Gibson	17,322	13–15–6	32	W1
35	December 29	Anaheim	1–0	Calgary		Gibson	19,289	14–15–6	34	W2
36	December 31	Anaheim	1–0	Edmonton		Gibson	16,839	15–15–6	36	W3

January: 8–3–1 (Home: 5–3–0; Road: 3–0–1)
#	Date	Visitor	Score	Home	OT	Decision	Attendance	Record	Pts	Recap
37	January 1	Anaheim	1–2	Vancouver	SO	Andersen	18,570	15–15–7	37	O1
38	January 3	Winnipeg	1–4	Anaheim		Gibson	17,174	16–15–7	39	W1
39	January 6	Toronto	4–0	Anaheim		Gibson	16,283	16–16–7	39	L1
40	January 8	St. Louis	3–4	Anaheim	SO	Gibson	16,250	17–16–7	41	W1
41	January 10	Detroit	2–1	Anaheim		Gibson	17,174	17–17–7	41	L1
42	January 13	Ottawa	1–4	Anaheim		Andersen	15,791	18–17–7	43	W1
43	January 15	Dallas	2–4	Anaheim		Andersen	16,201	19–17–7	45	W2
44	January 17	Los Angeles	3–2	Anaheim		Gibson	17,227	19–18–7	45	L1
45	January 20	Minnesota	1–3	Anaheim		Gibson	15,962	20–18–7	47	W1
–	January 22	Anaheim		Washington	Game rescheduled to April 10 due to hazardous weather.
46	January 23	Anaheim	4–3	Detroit		Gibson	20,027	21–18–7	49	W2
47	January 26	Anaheim	6–2	Boston		Andersen	17,565	22–18–7	51	W3

February: 12–1–1 (Home: 6–0–0; Road: 6–1–1)
#	Date	Visitor	Score	Home	OT	Decision	Attendance	Record	Pts	Recap
48	February 2	San Jose	2–3	Anaheim		Andersen	16,588	23–18–7	53	W4
49	February 4	Anaheim	4–2	Los Angeles		Gibson	18,230	24–18–7	55	W5
50	February 5	Arizona	2–5	Anaheim		Andersen	17,342	25–18–7	57	W6
51	February 8	Anaheim	2–6	Pittsburgh		Gibson	18,418	25–19–7	57	L1
52	February 9	Anaheim	4–1	Philadelphia		Andersen	18,717	26–19–7	59	W1
53	February 11	Anaheim	3–4	Columbus	SO	Andersen	12,117	26–19–8	60	O1
54	February 13	Anaheim	3–2	Chicago	OT	Andersen	22,107	27–19–8	62	W1
55	February 15	Anaheim	6–4	Calgary		Andersen	19,289	28–19–8	64	W2
56	February 16	Anaheim	5–3	Edmonton		Andersen	16,839	29–19–8	66	W3
57	February 18	Anaheim	5–2	Vancouver		Gibson	18,435	30–19–8	68	W4
58	February 21	Calgary	2–5	Anaheim		Gibson	17,174	31–19–8	70	W5
59	February 24	Buffalo	0–1	Anaheim		Andersen	16,543	32–19–8	72	W6
60	February 26	Edmonton	1–2	Anaheim	OT	Andersen	17,174	33–19–8	74	W7
61	February 28	Los Angeles	2–4	Anaheim		Gibson	17,174	34–19–8	76	W8

March: 9–4–2 (Home: 4–1–1; Road: 5–3–1)
#	Date	Visitor	Score	Home	OT	Decision	Attendance	Record	Pts	Recap
62	March 2	Montreal	2–3	Anaheim	SO	Gibson	15,273	35–19–8	78	W9
63	March 3	Anaheim	5–1	Arizona		Andersen	11,999	36–19–8	80	W10
64	March 5	Anaheim	3–2	Los Angeles		Andersen	18,230	37–19–8	82	W11
65	March 7	Washington	2–1	Anaheim	SO	Gibson	17,174	37–19–9	83	O1
66	March 9	Anaheim	0–3	Colorado		Gibson	14,292	37–20–9	83	L1
67	March 11	Anaheim	2–5	St. Louis		Andersen	19,412	37–21–9	83	L2
68	March 14	New Jersey	1–7	Anaheim		Andersen	15,423	38–21–9	85	W1
69	March 16	NY Rangers	2–1	Anaheim		Gibson	15,400	38–22–9	85	L1
70	March 18	Boston	0–4	Anaheim		Andersen	16,707	39–22–9	87	W1
71	March 20	Anaheim	3–2	Winnipeg	OT	Gibson	15,294	40–22–9	89	W2
72	March 22	Anaheim	3–4	Montreal		Gibson	21,288	40–23–9	89	L1
73	March 24	Anaheim	5–6	Toronto	OT	Andersen	18,935	40–23–10	90	O1
74	March 26	Anaheim	4–3	Ottawa	OT	Andersen	18,162	41–23–10	92	W1
75	March 28	Anaheim	2–1	Edmonton		Gibson	16,839	42–23–10	94	W2
76	March 30	Calgary	3–8	Anaheim		Gibson	16,004	43–23–10	96	W3

April: 3–2–1 (Home: 1–1–1; Road: 2–1–0)
#	Date	Visitor	Score	Home	OT	Decision	Attendance	Record	Pts	Recap
77	April 1	Vancouver	3–2	Anaheim		Gibson	16,331	43–24–10	96	L1
78	April 3	Dallas	1–3	Anaheim		Gibson	16,585	44–24–10	98	W1
79	April 5	Winnipeg	2–1	Anaheim	OT	Gibson	16,743	44–24–11	99	O1
80	April 7	Anaheim	1–2	Los Angeles		Gibson	18,511	44–25–11	99	L1
81	April 9	Anaheim	5–3	Colorado		Gibson	17,932	45–25–11	101	W1
82	April 10	Anaheim	2–0	Washington		Andersen	18,506	46–25–11	103	W2

Legend: Win (2 points) Loss (0 points) Overtime/shootout loss (1 point)

=== Playoffs ===
2016 Stanley Cup playoffs

Western Conference First Round vs. (WC) Nashville Predators: Nashville won 4–3
#	Date	Visitor	Score	Home	OT	Decision	Attendance	Series	Recap
1	April 15	Nashville	3–2	Anaheim		Gibson	17,236	0–1	Recap
2	April 17	Nashville	3–2	Anaheim		Gibson	17,174	0–2	Recap
3	April 19	Anaheim	3–0	Nashville		Andersen	17,204	1–2	Recap
4	April 21	Anaheim	4–1	Nashville		Andersen	17,232	2–2	Recap
5	April 23	Nashville	2–5	Anaheim		Andersen	17,360	3–2	Recap
6	April 25	Anaheim	1–3	Nashville		Andersen	17,113	3–3	Recap
7	April 27	Nashville	2–1	Anaheim		Andersen	17,407	3–4	Recap

Legend: Win Loss

== Player statistics ==
Final stats

=== Skaters ===
Regular season
Player	GP	G	A	Pts	+/−	PIM
Ryan Getzlaf	77	13	50	63	14	55
Corey Perry	82	34	28	62	2	68
Ryan Kesler	79	21	32	53	5	78
Rickard Rakell	72	20	23	43	−1	19
Jakob Silfverberg	82	20	19	39	8	32
Sami Vatanen	71	9	29	38	8	20
Andrew Cogliano	82	9	23	32	2	28
Hampus Lindholm	80	10	18	28	7	40
Cam Fowler	69	5	23	28	−8	27
Chris Stewart	56	8	12	20	2	73
David Perron^{†}	28	8	12	20	12	34
Mike Santorelli	70	9	9	18	−4	8
Shawn Horcoff	59	6	9	15	1	34
Josh Manson	71	5	10	15	11	74
Kevin Bieksa	71	4	11	15	−7	99
Patrick Maroon^{‡}	56	4	9	13	−13	54
Jamie McGinn^{†}	21	8	4	12	3	23
Carl Hagelin^{‡}	43	4	8	12	−10	14
Ryan Garbutt^{†}	37	5	3	8	−4	21
Shea Theodore	19	3	5	8	7	2
Nate Thompson	49	3	3	6	−1	47
Clayton Stoner	50	1	5	6	4	67
Brandon Pirri^{†}	9	3	2	5	0	0
Nick Ritchie	33	2	2	4	−2	37
Simon Despres	32	0	4	4	2	8
Jiri Sekac^{‡}	22	1	2	3	0	4
Korbinian Holzer	29	0	3	3	−3	10
Chris Wagner^{‡†}	17	0	2	2	0	19
Michael Sgarbossa	1	0	0	0	0	0
Harry Zolnierczyk	1	0	0	0	−1	0
Stefan Noesen	1	0	0	0	0	0
Tim Jackman^{‡}	2	0	0	0	−2	4
Max Friberg^{‡}	5	0	0	0	−1	2

Playoffs
Player	GP	G	A	Pts	+/−	PIM
Ryan Getzlaf	7	2	3	5	4	4
Jakob Silfverberg	7	0	5	5	1	6
Ryan Kesler	7	4	0	4	2	0
Andrew Cogliano	7	2	2	4	−1	0
Sami Vatanen	7	1	3	4	4	6
Corey Perry	7	0	4	4	−7	6
Chris Stewart	7	1	2	3	2	0
David Perron	7	1	2	3	3	8
Cam Fowler	7	1	2	3	−2	4
Hampus Lindholm	7	0	3	3	6	0
Jamie McGinn	7	2	0	2	−2	2
Nate Thompson	7	2	0	2	0	2
Rickard Rakell	7	1	1	2	−4	0
Ryan Garbutt	7	1	0	1	3	6
Shawn Horcoff	5	0	1	1	0	2
Kevin Bieksa	6	0	1	1	1	2
Clayton Stoner	1	0	0	0	−1	0
Simon Despres	7	0	0	0	−5	6
Chris Wagner	2	0	0	0	0	0
Josh Manson	1	0	0	0	0	0
Shea Theodore	6	0	0	0	−1	0

=== Goaltenders ===
Regular season
Player	GP	GS	TOI	W	L	OT	GA	GAA	SA	SV%	SO	G	A	PIM
Frederik Andersen	43	37	2,298	22	9	7	88	2.30	1086	0.919	3	0	1	2
John Gibson	40	38	2,295	21	13	4	79	2.07	992	0.920	4	0	1	2
Anton Khudobin	9	7	356	3	3	0	16	2.70	175	0.909	1	0	0	0

Playoffs
Player	GP	GS	TOI	W	L	GA	GAA	SA	SV%	SO	G	A	PIM
Frederik Andersen	5	5	297	3	2	7	1.41	132	0.947	1	0	0	0
John Gibson	2	2	117	0	2	6	3.08	60	0.900	0	0	0	0

^{†}Denotes player spent time with another team before joining the Ducks. Stats reflect time with the Ducks only.
^{‡}Denotes player was traded mid-season. Stats reflect time with the Team only.
Bold/italics denotes franchise record.

== Suspensions/fines ==
Player	Explanation	Length	Salary	Date issued
Nate Thompson	Illegal check to the head of Carolina Hurricanes defenseman Justin Faulk during NHL Game No. 434 in Anaheim on Friday, December 11, 2015, at 6:25 of the first period.	3 games	$25,806.45	December 14, 2015
Shawn Horcoff	Violating the terms of the NHL/NHLPA Performance Enhancing Substances Program.	20 games	$357,526.88	January 26, 2016

== Awards and honours ==
=== Awards ===
Regular season
Player	Award	Awarded
J. Gibson	NHL First Star of the Week	December 7, 2015
J. Gibson	NHL Rookie of the Month (December)	January 4, 2016
J. Gibson	NHL All-Star game selection	January 6, 2016
C. Perry	NHL All-Star game selection	January 6, 2016
R. Getzlaf	NHL First Star of the Month (February)	March 1, 2016

=== Milestones ===
Regular season
Player	Milestone	Reached
J. Manson	1st career NHL goal	November 6, 2015
S. Horcoff	500th career NHL point	November 11, 2015
C. Perry	300th career NHL goal	November 11, 2015
J. Silfverberg	200th career NHL game	November 17, 2015

== Transactions ==
Following the end of the Ducks' 2014–15 season, and during the 2015–16 season, this team has been involved in the following transactions:

=== Trades ===
Date	Details		Ref
June 27, 2015	To New Jersey Devils Kyle Palmieri	To Anaheim Ducks 2nd-round pick in 2015; 3rd-round pick in 2016
June 27, 2015	To New York Rangers Emerson Etem; FLA's 2nd-round pick in 2015	To Anaheim Ducks Carl Hagelin; 2nd-round pick in 2015; 6th-round pick in 2015
June 27, 2015	To Carolina Hurricanes James Wisniewski	To Anaheim Ducks Anton Khudobin
June 30, 2015	To Vancouver Canucks 2nd-round pick in 2016	To Anaheim Ducks Kevin Bieksa
January 7, 2016	To Montreal Canadiens Max Friberg	To Anaheim Ducks Dustin Tokarski
January 16, 2016	To Pittsburgh Penguins Carl Hagelin	To Anaheim Ducks David Perron; Adam Clendening
January 21, 2016	To Chicago Blackhawks Jiri Sekac	To Anaheim Ducks Ryan Garbutt
February 29, 2016	To Buffalo Sabres Conditional 3rd-round pick in 2016	To Anaheim Ducks Jamie McGinn
February 29, 2016	To Florida Panthers 6th-round pick in 2016	To Anaheim Ducks Brandon Pirri
February 29, 2016	To Chicago Blackhawks Tim Jackman; 7th-round pick in 2017	To Anaheim Ducks Corey Tropp
February 29, 2016	To Edmonton Oilers Patrick Maroon	To Anaheim Ducks Martin Gernat; 4th-round pick in 2016
June 20, 2016	To Toronto Maple Leafs Frederik Andersen	To Anaheim Ducks PIT's 1st-round pick in 2016; 2nd-round pick in 2017

=== Free agents acquired ===
Date	Player	Former team	Contract terms (in U.S. dollars)	Ref
July 1, 2015	Matt Hackett	Buffalo Sabres	2 years, $1.2 million	
July 1, 2015	Chris Mueller	New York Rangers	1 year, $600,000	
July 1, 2015	Joe Piskula	Nashville Predators	1 year, $600,000	
July 3, 2015	Shawn Horcoff	Dallas Stars	1 year, $1.75 million	
July 3, 2015	Harry Zolnierczyk	New York Islanders	1 year, $600,000	
July 10, 2015	Brian McGrattan	Calgary Flames	1 year, $600,000	
July 12, 2015	Chris Stewart	Minnesota Wild	1 year, $1.7 million	
July 16, 2015	Shane O'Brien	Florida Panthers	1 year, $600,000	
August 17, 2015	Mike Santorelli	Nashville Predators	1 year, $875,000	
March 30, 2016	Kalle Kossila	St. Cloud State University	2 years, entry-level contract	
March 30, 2016	Kevin Boyle	University of Massachusetts Lowell	1 year, entry-level contract	

=== Free agents lost ===
Date	Player	New team	Contract terms (in U.S. dollars)	Ref
July 1, 2015	Francois Beauchemin	Colorado Avalanche	3 years, $13.5 million	
July 1, 2015	Matt Beleskey	Boston Bruins	5 years, $19.8 million	
July 2, 2015	Jason LaBarbera	Philadelphia Flyers	1 year, $600,000	

=== Claimed via waivers ===
Player	Former team	Date claimed off waivers	Ref
Chris Wagner	Colorado Avalanche	February 25, 2016	

=== Lost via waivers ===
Player	New team	Date claimed off waivers	Ref
Chris Wagner	Colorado Avalanche	November 15, 2015	
Adam Clendening	Edmonton Oilers	January 27, 2016	

=== Lost via retirement ===
Date	Player	Ref

=== Player signings ===
The following players were signed by the Ducks. Two-way contracts are marked with an asterisk (*).

Date	Player	Contract terms (in U.S. dollars)	Ref
July 1, 2015	Korbinian Holzer	1 year, $750,000	
July 2, 2015	Kevin Bieksa	2 years, $8 million contract extension	
July 15, 2015	Ryan Kesler	6 years, $41.25 million contract extension	
July 16, 2015	Michael Sgarbossa	1 year, $600,000	
July 16, 2015	Chris Wagner	1 year, $600,000	
July 16, 2015	Julius Nattinen	3 years, entry-level contract	
July 22, 2015	Josh Manson	2 years, contract extension	
August 7, 2015	Jakob Silfverberg	4 years, $15 million	
August 14, 2015	Carl Hagelin	4 years, $16 million	
September 21, 2015	John Gibson	3 years, $6.9 million	
October 9, 2015	Simon Despres	5 years, $4.5 million contract extension	
April 1, 2016	Chris Wagner	2 years, contract extension	
April 4, 2016	Andy Welinski	2 years, entry-level contract	
April 8, 2016	Kevin Roy	2 years, entry-level contract	
April 20, 2016	Keaton Thompson	3 years, entry-level contract	
May 20, 2016	Jacob Larsson	3 years, entry-level contract	
June 18, 2016	Sami Vatanen	4 years, $19.5 million contract extension	
June 23, 2016	Michael Sgarbossa	1 year, contract extension	
June 23, 2016	Joseph Cramarossa	1 year, contract extension	
June 23, 2016	Andrew O'Brien	1 year, contract extension	

== Draft picks ==
Below are the Anaheim Ducks' selections at the 2015 NHL entry draft, to be held on June 26–27, 2015, at the BB&T Center in Sunrise, Florida.

Round	#	Player	Pos	Nationality	College/Junior/Club team (League)
1	27	Jacob Larsson	D	Sweden	Frolunda HC (SHL)
2	59^{[a]}	Julius Nattinen	C	Finland	JYP (Liiga)
3	80^{[b]}	Brent Gates	C	United States	Green Bay Gamblers (USHL)
3	84^{[c]}	Deven Sideroff	RW	Canada	Kamloops Blazers (WHL)
5	148	Troy Terry	C/RW	United States	USA U-18 (USHL)
6	178	Steven Ruggiero	D	United States	USA U-18 (USHL)
6	179^{[d]}	Garrett Metcalf	G	United States	Madison Capitols (USHL)

=== Notes ===
Draft notes

- The Anaheim Ducks' second-round pick went to the Columbus Blue Jackets as the result of a trade on March 2, 2015 that sent James Wisniewski and Detroit's third-round pick in 2015 to Anaheim in exchange for Rene Bourque, William Karlsson and this pick.
- ^{a} The New York Rangers' second-round pick went to the Anaheim Ducks as the result of a trade on June 27, 2015 that sent Emerson Etem and Florida's second-round pick in 2015 to New York in exchange for Carl Hagelin, a sixth-round pick in 2015 and this pick.
- ^{b} The Detroit Red Wings' third-round pick went to the Anaheim Ducks as the result of a trade on March 2, 2015 that sent Rene Bourque, William Karlsson and a second-round pick in 2015 to Columbus in exchange for James Wisniewski and this pick.
- ^{c} The Vancouver Canucks' third-round pick went to the Anaheim Ducks as the result of a trade on June 27, 2014 that sent Nick Bonino, Luca Sbisa and a first and third-round pick in 2014 to Vancouver in exchange for Ryan Kesler and this pick.
- The Anaheim Ducks' third-round pick went to the Florida Panthers as the result of a trade on February 28, 2015 that sent Tomas Fleischmann to Anaheim in exchange for Dany Heatley and this pick.
- The Anaheim Ducks' fourth-round pick went to the Tampa Bay Lightning as the result of a trade on June 29, 2014 that sent Nate Thompson to Anaheim in exchange for a seventh-round pick in 2015 and this pick.
- ^{d} The New York Rangers' sixth-round pick went to the Anaheim Ducks as the result of a trade on June 27, 2015 that sent Emerson Etem and a second-round pick in 2015 (From New Jersey via Florida) to New York in exchange for the rights to Carl Hagelin, a second-round pick in 2015 and this pick.
- The Anaheim Ducks' seventh-round pick went to the Edmonton Oilers as the result of a trade on June 27, 2015 that sent Dallas' seventh-round pick in 2016 to Tampa Bay in exchange for this pick.

Tampa Bay previously acquired this pick as the result of a trade on June 29, 2014 that sent Nate Thompson to Anaheim in exchange for a fourth-round pick in 2015 and this pick.
