= 2015–16 Columbus Blue Jackets season =

National Hockey League season

2015–16 Columbus Blue Jackets
- Division: 8th Metropolitan
- Conference: 15th Eastern
- 2015–16 record: 34–40–8
- Home record: 18–17–6
- Road record: 16–23–2
- Goals for: 219
- Goals against: 252

Team information
- General manager: Jarmo Kekäläinen
- Coach: Todd Richards (Oct. 9 – Oct. 21); John Tortorella (Oct. 21 – Apr. 10)
- Captain: Nick Foligno
- Alternate captains: Brandon Dubinsky; Boone Jenner
- Arena: Nationwide Arena
- Minor league affiliate: Lake Erie Monsters (AHL)

Team leaders
- Goals: Brandon Saad (31)
- Assists: Alexander Wennberg (32)
- Points: Cam Atkinson; Brandon Saad (53)
- Penalty minutes: Scott Hartnell (112)
- Plus/minus: Kevin Connauton (+10)
- Wins: Joonas Korpisalo (16)
- Goals against average: Joonas Korpisalo (2.60)

The 2015–16 Columbus Blue Jackets season was the 16th season for the National Hockey League (NHL) franchise that was established on June 25, 1997. Columbus hired head coach John Tortorella following the firing of Todd Richards, who started the season 0–8–0. The team began its regular season games on October 9, 2015 against the New York Rangers. The team would missed the playoffs for the second year in a row for the first time since the 2011–12 season and the 2012–13 season

== Regular season ==
After a seven game losing streak to start the season, the Blue Jackets fired head coach Todd Richards and hired John Tortorella on October 21.

== Standings ==
Metropolitan Division
Pos	Team	GP	W	L	OTL	ROW	GF	GA	GD	Pts
1	p – Washington Capitals	82	56	18	8	52	252	193	+59	120
2	x – Pittsburgh Penguins	82	48	26	8	44	245	203	+42	104
3	x – New York Rangers	82	46	27	9	43	236	217	+19	101
4	x – New York Islanders	82	45	27	10	40	232	216	+16	100
5	x – Philadelphia Flyers	82	41	27	14	38	214	218	−4	96
6	Carolina Hurricanes	82	35	31	16	33	198	226	−28	86
7	New Jersey Devils	82	38	36	8	36	184	208	−24	84
8	Columbus Blue Jackets	82	34	40	8	28	219	252	−33	76

Source: National Hockey League
p – Clinched Presidents' Trophy; x – Clinched playoff spot

Eastern Conference Wild Card
Pos	Div	Team	GP	W	L	OTL	ROW	GF	GA	GD	Pts
1	ME	x – New York Islanders	82	45	27	10	40	232	216	+16	100
2	ME	x – Philadelphia Flyers	82	41	27	14	38	214	218	−4	96
3	AT	Boston Bruins	82	42	31	9	38	240	230	+10	93
4	ME	Carolina Hurricanes	82	35	31	16	33	198	226	−28	86
5	AT	Ottawa Senators	82	38	35	9	32	236	247	−11	85
6	ME	New Jersey Devils	82	38	36	8	36	184	208	−24	84
7	AT	Montreal Canadiens	82	38	38	6	33	221	236	−15	82
8	AT	Buffalo Sabres	82	35	36	11	33	201	222	−21	81
9	ME	Columbus Blue Jackets	82	34	40	8	28	219	252	−33	76
10	AT	Toronto Maple Leafs	82	29	42	11	23	198	246	−48	69

Source: National Hockey League
x – Clinched playoff spot

== Schedule and results ==
=== Pre-season ===
2015 pre-season game log: 5–2–1 (home: 2–1–1; road: 3–1–0)
#	Date	Visitor	Score	Home	OT	Decision	Attendance	Record	Recap
1	September 21	Pittsburgh	1–0	Columbus	SO	Korpisalo	11,363	0–0–1	Recap
2^{[A]}	September 22	St. Louis	1–3	Columbus		Bobrovsky	10,064	1–0–1	Recap
3^{[A]}	September 22	Columbus	2–5	St. Louis		McElhinney	10,388	1–1–1	Recap
4	September 24	Minnesota	5–2	Columbus		Forsberg	10,209	1–2–1	Recap
5	September 26	Columbus	4–2	Pittsburgh		Bobrovsky	18,265	2–2–1	Recap
6	September 29	Columbus	5–2	Nashville		Bobrovsky	16,027	3–2–1	Recap
7	October 2	Columbus	6–4	Buffalo		McElhinney	17,578	4–2–1	Recap
8	October 3	Nashville	1–7	Columbus		Bobrovsky	13,795	5–2–1	Recap
^{A} – indicates split-squad game.

=== Regular season ===
2015–16 game log

October: 2–10–0 (home: 0–5–0; road: 2–5–0)
#	Date	Visitor	Score	Home	OT	Decision	Attendance	Record	Pts	Recap
1	October 9	NY Rangers	4–2	Columbus		Bobrovsky	19,027	0–1–0	0	Recap
2	October 10	Columbus	2–5	NY Rangers		Bobrovsky	18,006	0–2–0	0	Recap
3	October 12	Columbus	2–4	Buffalo		Bobrovsky	18,075	0–3–0	0	Recap
4	October 14	Ottawa	7–3	Columbus		Bobrovsky	13,803	0–4–0	0	Recap
5	October 16	Toronto	6–3	Columbus		Bobrovsky	13,885	0–5–0	0	Recap
6	October 17	Columbus	1–4	Chicago		McElhinney	21,563	0–6–0	0	Recap
7	October 20	NY Islanders	4–0	Columbus		McElhinney	14,295	0–7–0	0	Recap
8	October 22	Columbus	2–3	Minnesota		Bobrovsky	18,650	0–8–0	0	Recap
9	October 24	Columbus	4–3	Colorado		Bobrovsky	18,007	1–8–0	2	Recap
10	October 27	Columbus	3–1	New Jersey		Bobrovsky	12,847	2–8–0	4	Recap
11	October 30	Columbus	1–2	Washington		Bobrovsky	18,506	2–9–0	4	Recap
12	October 31	Winnipeg	3–2	Columbus		Bobrovsky	12,860	2–10–0	4	Recap

November: 8–5–0 (home: 4–2–0; road: 4–3–0)
#	Date	Visitor	Score	Home	OT	Decision	Attendance	Record	Pts	Recap
13	November 3	Columbus	5–2	San Jose		Bobrovsky	15,491	3–10–0	6	Recap
14	November 5	Columbus	3–2	Los Angeles		Bobrovsky	18,230	4–10–0	8	Recap
15	November 6	Columbus	2–4	Anaheim		McElhinney	17,174	4–11–0	8	Recap
16	November 10	Vancouver	5–3	Columbus		Bobrovsky	14,148	4–12–0	8	Recap
17	November 13	Columbus	2–1	Pittsburgh		Bobrovsky	18,610	5–12–0	10	Recap
18	November 14	Arizona	2–5	Columbus		Bobrovsky	13,702	6–12–0	12	Recap
19	November 17	St. Louis	1–3	Columbus		Bobrovsky	12,161	7–12–0	14	Recap
20	November 19	Columbus	0–3	Ottawa		McElhinney	16,925	7–13–0	14	Recap
21	November 20	Nashville	0–4	Columbus		Bobrovsky	13,584	8–13–0	16	Recap
22	November 22	San Jose	5–3	Columbus		Bobrovsky	13,397	8–14–0	16	Recap
23	November 25	Columbus	2–1	New Jersey		Bobrovsky	13,567	9–14–0	18	Recap
24	November 27	Pittsburgh	1–2	Columbus	OT	Bobrovsky	18,205	10–14–0	20	Recap
25	November 28	Columbus	1–3	St. Louis		Bobrovsky	19,227	10–15–0	20	Recap

December: 4–7–3 (home: 2–1–3; road: 2–6–0)
#	Date	Visitor	Score	Home	OT	Decision	Attendance	Record	Pts	Recap
26	December 1	Columbus	1–2	Montreal		Bobrovsky	21,288	10–16–0	20	Recap
27	December 4	Florida	2–1	Columbus	SO	Bobrovsky	14,162	10–16–1	21	Recap
28	December 5	Columbus	4–1	Philadelphia		Bobrovsky	18,202	11–16–1	23	Recap
29	December 8	Los Angeles	3–2	Columbus	OT	Bobrovsky	15,633	11–16–2	24	Recap
30	December 10	Columbus	4–6	Winnipeg		McElhinney	15,294	11–17–2	24	Recap
31	December 12	NY Islanders	3–2	Columbus	OT	McElhinney	12,342	11–17–3	25	Recap
32	December 14	Tampa Bay	2–1	Columbus		Korpisalo	12,494	11–18–3	25	Recap
33	December 15	Columbus	1–5	Dallas		Korpisalo	18,232	11–19–3	25	Recap
34	December 17	Columbus	7–5	Arizona		McElhinney	11,120	12–19–3	27	Recap
35	December 19	Philadelphia	2–3	Columbus	SO	Korpisalo	14,030	13–19–3	29	Recap
36	December 21	Columbus	2–5	Pittsburgh		Korpisalo	18,602	13–20–3	29	Recap
37	December 26	Columbus	2–5	Tampa Bay		Korpisalo	19,092	13–21–3	29	Recap
38	December 27	Columbus	2–3	Florida		McElhinney	16,902	13–22–3	29	Recap
39	December 29	Dallas	3–6	Columbus		McElhinney	15,836	14–22–3	31	Recap

January: 5–5–2 (home: 3–3–1; road: 2–2–1)
#	Date	Visitor	Score	Home	OT	Decision	Attendance	Record	Pts	Recap
40	January 2	Washington	4–5	Columbus	SO	Forsberg	17,170	15–22–3	33	Recap
41	January 5	Minnesota	4–2	Columbus		Forsberg	12,411	15–23–3	33	Recap
42	January 8	Columbus	1–4	Carolina		Forsberg	14,241	15–24–3	33	Recap
43	January 9	Carolina	4–3	Columbus	OT	Korpisalo	16,532	15–24–4	34	Recap
44	January 12	Columbus	2–5	NY Islanders		Forsberg	13,115	15–25–4	34	Recap
45	January 13	Columbus	3–1	Toronto		Korpisalo	18,903	16–25–4	36	Recap
46	January 16	Colorado	1–2	Columbus		Korpisalo	17,776	17–25–4	38	Recap
47	January 19	Washington	6–3	Columbus		Bobrovsky	12,291	17–26–4	38	Recap
48	January 21	Calgary	4–2	Columbus		Bobrovsky	12,492	17–27–4	38	Recap
49	January 23	Columbus	2–3	Boston	SO	Korpisalo	17,565	17–27–5	39	Recap
50	January 25	Montreal	2–5	Columbus		Korpisalo	11,927	18–27–5	41	Recap
51	January 26	Columbus	5–2	Montreal		Korpisalo	21,288	19–27–5	43	Recap

February: 7–3–3 (home: 4–1–2; road: 3–2–1)
#	Date	Visitor	Score	Home	OT	Decision	Attendance	Record	Pts	Recap
52	February 2	Columbus	1–5	Edmonton		Korpisalo	16,839	19–28–5	43	Recap
53	February 4	Columbus	2–1	Vancouver	SO	Korpisalo	18,199	20–28–5	45	Recap
54	February 5	Columbus	2–1	Calgary		Korpisalo	19,289	21–28–5	47	Recap
55	February 9	NY Islanders	3–2	Columbus	SO	Korpisalo	14,303	21–28–6	48	Recap
56	February 11	Anaheim	3–4	Columbus	SO	Korpisalo	12,117	22–28–6	50	Recap
57	February 13	Ottawa	2–4	Columbus		Korpisalo	16,164	23–28–6	52	Recap
58	February 16	Boston	2–1	Columbus	OT	Korpisalo	13,140	23–28–7	53	Recap
59	February 19	Buffalo	4–0	Columbus		Korpisalo	14,923	23–29–7	53	Recap
60	February 22	Columbus	6–4	Boston		Korpisalo	17,565	24–29–7	55	Recap
61	February 23	Columbus	1–2	Detroit	SO	McElhinney	20,027	24–29–8	56	Recap
62	February 25	New Jersey	1–6	Columbus		Korpisalo	12,590	25–29–8	58	Recap
63	February 27	Florida	3–4	Columbus	SO	Korpisalo	15,400	26–29–8	60	Recap
64	February 29	Columbus	1–2	NY Rangers		Korpisalo	18,006	26–30–8	60	Recap

March: 4–9–0 (home: 4–4–0; road: 0–5–0)
#	Date	Visitor	Score	Home	OT	Decision	Attendance	Record	Pts	Recap
65	March 4	Edmonton	3–6	Columbus		Korpisalo	16,789	27–30–8	62	Recap
66	March 5	Columbus	0–6	Philadelphia		McElhinney	19,645	27–31–8	62	Recap
67	March 8	Detroit	3–5	Columbus		Korpisalo	14,426	28–31–8	64	Recap
68	March 11	Pittsburgh	3–2	Columbus		Bobrovsky	18,205	28–32–8	64	Recap
69	March 13	Tampa Bay	4–0	Columbus		Bobrovsky	14,701	28–33–8	64	Recap
70	March 17	Detroit	3–1	Columbus		Bobrovsky	14,415	28–34–8	64	Recap
71	March 19	New Jersey	3–6	Columbus		Bobrovsky	14,447	29–34–8	66	Recap
72	March 20	Columbus	1–2	New Jersey		Korpisalo	15,146	29–35–8	66	Recap
73	March 22	Philadelphia	2–3	Columbus	SO	Bobrovsky	16,230	30–35–8	68	Recap
74	March 24	Carolina	3–2	Columbus		Bobrovsky	15,624	30–36–8	68	Recap
75	March 26	Columbus	1–5	Nashville		Korpisalo	17,113	30–37–8	68	Recap
76	March 28	Columbus	1–4	Washington		Bobrovsky	18,506	30–38–8	68	Recap
77	March 31	Columbus	3–4	NY Islanders		Bobrovsky	13,857	30–39–8	68	Recap

April: 4–1–0 (home: 1–1–0; road: 3–0–0)
#	Date	Visitor	Score	Home	OT	Decision	Attendance	Record	Pts	Recap
78	April 2	Columbus	5–1	Carolina		Korpisalo	11,542	31–39–8	70	Recap
79	April 4	NY Rangers	4–2	Columbus		Korpisalo	15,951	31–40–8	70	Recap
80	April 6	Columbus	5–1	Toronto		Bobrovsky	18,837	32–40–8	72	Recap
81	April 8	Columbus	4–1	Buffalo		Korpisalo	19,070	33–40–8	74	Recap
82	April 9	Chicago	4–5	Columbus	OT	Bobrovsky	19,177	34–40–8	76	Recap

Legend: Win (2 points) Loss (0 points) Overtime/shootout loss (1 point)

== Player statistics ==
Final stats

Skaters

Regular season
Player	GP	G	A	Pts	+/−	PIM
Brandon Saad	78	31	22	53	1	14
Cam Atkinson	81	27	26	53	−8	22
Boone Jenner	82	30	19	49	−15	77
Scott Hartnell	79	23	26	49	−11	112
Brandon Dubinsky	75	17	31	48	−16	71
Alexander Wennberg	69	8	32	40	−1	2
Nick Foligno	72	12	25	37	−14	53
Ryan Johansen^{‡}	38	6	20	26	−4	25
David Savard	65	4	21	25	−7	45
Ryan Murray	82	4	21	25	−10	40
Matt Calvert	73	11	13	24	1	51
William Karlsson	81	9	11	20	−9	6
Seth Jones^{†}	41	2	18	20	−9	12
Jack Johnson	60	6	8	14	−16	25
Gregory Campbell	82	3	8	11	−6	78
Dalton Prout	64	3	6	9	−6	102
Kerby Rychel	32	2	7	9	5	15
Oliver Bjorkstrand	12	4	4	8	6	0
Rene Bourque	49	3	5	8	−9	38
Cody Goloubef	43	1	7	8	−3	20
Kevin Connauton^{‡}	27	1	7	8	10	21
David Clarkson	23	2	2	4	−8	23
Josh Anderson	12	1	3	4	0	2
Justin Falk	24	0	4	4	2	17
Fedor Tyutin	61	1	2	3	−6	28
Jared Boll	30	1	2	3	−3	61
Michael Chaput	8	1	1	2	3	5
Andrew Bodnarchuk^{‡}	16	0	2	2	−6	8
Sonny Milano	3	0	1	1	1	0
John Ramage	1	0	0	0	−2	0
Michael Paliotta	1	0	0	0	0	4
Markus Hannikainen	4	0	0	0	−2	0
Dean Kukan	8	0	0	0	9	0

Goaltenders

Regular season
Player	GP	GS	TOI	W	L	OT	GA	GAA	SA	SV%	SO	G	A	PIM
Sergei Bobrovsky	37	37	2,116	15	19	1	97	2.75	1049	.908	1	0	2	2
Joonas Korpisalo	31	30	1,803	16	11	4	78	2.60	969	.920	0	0	0	2
Curtis McElhinney	18	12	835	2	7	3	46	3.31	417	.890	0	0	1	0
Anton Forsberg	4	3	178	1	3	0	9	3.03	97	.907	0	0	0	0

^{†}Denotes player spent time with another team before joining the Blue Jackets. Statistics reflect time with the Blue Jackets only.
^{‡}Denotes player was traded mid-season. Statistics reflect time with the Blue Jackets only.
Bold/italics denotes franchise record.

== Player suspensions/fines ==
Player	Explanation	Length	Salary	Date issued
Brandon Dubinsky	Cross-checking Pittsburgh Penguins forward Sidney Crosby during NHL game No. 337 in Columbus on Friday, November 27, 2015, at 18:40 of the second period.	1 game	$31,451.61	November 28, 2015

== Awards and honours ==
=== Awards ===
Regular season
Player	Award	Awarded
Brandon Saad	NHL All-Star game selection	January 6, 2016
C. Atkinson	NHL Second Star of the Week	February 1, 2016

=== Milestones ===
Regular season
Player	Milestone	Reached
S. Hartnell	600th career NHL point	October 16, 2015
D. Savard	200th career NHL game	November 3, 2015
R. Johansen	100th career NHL assist	November 3, 2015
J. Boll	500th career NHL game	November 17, 2015
R. Murray	100th career NHL game	November 22, 2015
M. Hannikainen	1st career NHL game	November 28, 2015
R. Johansen	300th career NHL game	December 12, 2015
J. Johnson	600th career NHL game	December 12, 2015
J. Korpisalo	1st career NHL game	December 14, 2015
J. Korpisalo	1st career NHL win	December 19, 2015

== Transactions ==
The Blue Jackets have been involved in the following transactions during the 2015–16 season.

=== Trades ===
Date	Details		Ref
June 26, 2015	To Toronto Maple Leafs TOR's 2nd-round pick in 2015; PHI's 3rd-round pick in 2015	To Columbus Blue Jackets TBL's 1st-round pick in 2015
June 30, 2015	To Chicago Blackhawks Artem Anisimov; Marko Dano; Jeremy Morin; Corey Tropp; 4th-round pick in 2016	To Columbus Blue Jackets Brandon Saad; Michael Paliotta; Alex Broadhurst
January 6, 2016	To Nashville Predators Ryan Johansen	To Columbus Blue Jackets Seth Jones

=== Free agents acquired ===
Date	Player	Former team	Contract terms (in U.S. dollars)	Ref
July 1, 2015	Gregory Campbell	Boston Bruins	2 years, $3 million	
July 2, 2015	Andrew Bodnarchuk	Manchester Monarchs	1 year, $650,000	
July 2, 2015	Brett Gallant	Bridgeport Sound Tigers	2 years, $1.5 million	
July 2, 2015	Jaime Sifers	Springfield Falcons	2 years, $1.25 million	
July 3, 2015	John Ramage	Calgary Flames	1 year, $600,000	
July 7, 2015	Kole Sherwood	Youngstown Phantoms	3 years, entry-level contract	
October 1, 2015	Oleg Yevenko	Adirondack Flames	1 year, entry-level contract	
March 21, 2016	Jordan Maletta	Niagara IceDogs	3 years, entry-level contract	
April 15, 2016	Justin Scott	Barrie Colts	3 years, entry-level contract	

=== Free agents lost ===
Date	Player	New team	Contract terms (in U.S. dollars)	Ref
July 1, 2015	Mike Reilly	Minnesota Wild	2 years, entry-level contract	
July 1, 2015	Mark Letestu	Edmonton Oilers	3 years, $5.4 million	
July 1, 2015	Brian Gibbons	New York Rangers	1 year, $600,000	
July 1, 2015	Sean Collins	Washington Capitals	1 year, $575,000	
July 3, 2015	Luke Adam	New York Rangers	1 year, $600,000	
October 6, 2015	Jack Skille	Colorado Avalanche	1 year	

=== Claimed via waivers ===
Player	Previous team	Date

=== Lost via waivers ===
Player	New team	Date
Andrew Bodnarchuk	Colorado Avalanche	January 5, 2016
Kevin Connauton	Arizona Coyotes	January 13, 2016

=== Player signings ===
Date	Player	Contract terms (in U.S. dollars)	Ref
July 3, 2015	Brandon Saad	6 years, $36 million contract extension	
July 9, 2015	Matt Calvert	3 years, $6.6 million contract extension	
July 23, 2015	Michael Chaput	1 year, $650,000 contract extension	
August 20, 2015	Paul Bittner	3 years, entry-level contract	
September 8, 2015	David Savard	5 years, $21.25 million contract extension	
December 20, 2015	Keegan Kolesar	3 years, entry-level contract	
February 11, 2016	Ryan Murray	2 years, $5.65 million contract extension	
February 29, 2016	Boone Jenner	2 years, $5.8 million contract extension	
March 1, 2016	John Ramage	2 years, contract extension	
March 7, 2016	Oleg Yevenko	1 year, contract extension	
March 25, 2016	Dalton Prout	2 years, contract extension	
March 29, 2016	Zach Werenski	3 years, entry-level contract	
April 19, 2016	Gabriel Carlsson	3 years, entry-level contract	
May 3, 2016	Markus Nutivaara	2 years, entry-level contract	
May 25, 2016	Lukas Sedlak	1 year	
June 17, 2016	Anton Forsberg	1 year	
June 23, 2016	William Karlsson	2 years, $2 million	

== Draft picks ==
Below are the Columbus Blue Jackets' selections at the 2015 NHL entry draft, to be held on June 26–27, 2015 at the BB&T Center in Sunrise, Florida.

Round	#	Player	Pos	Nationality	College/junior/club team (league)
1	8	Zach Werenski	D	United States	University of Michigan (Big Ten)
1	29^{[a]}	Gabriel Carlsson	D	Sweden	Linkopings HC (SHL)
2	38	Paul Bittner	LW	United States	Portland Winterhawks (WHL)
2	58^{[b]}	Kevin Stenlund	C	Sweden	HV71 J20 (J20 SuperElit)
3	69	Keegan Kolesar	RW	Canada	Seattle Thunderbirds (WHL)
5	129	Sam Ruopp	D	Canada	Prince George Cougars (WHL)
5	141^{[c]}	Veeti Vainio	D	Finland	Espoo Blues Jr. (Finland Jr.)
6	159	Vladislav Gavrikov	D	Russia	Lokomotiv Yaroslavl (KHL)
7	189	Markus Nutivaara	D	Finland	Oulun Kärpät (Finland)

Draft notes

- ^{a} The Tampa Bay Lightning's first-round pick went to the Columbus Blue Jackets as the result of a trade on June 26, 2015 that sent Toronto's second-round pick in 2015 (34th overall) and Philadelphia's third-round pick in 2015 (68th overall) to Toronto in exchange for this pick.
  Toronto previously acquired this pick as the result of a trade on June 26, 2015 that sent Nashville's first-round pick in 2015 (24th overall) to Philadelphia in exchange for Chicago's second-round pick in 2015 (61st overall) and this pick.
  Philadelphia previously acquired this pick as the result of a trade on March 2, 2015 that sent Braydon Coburn to Tampa Bay in exchange for Radko Gudas, a third-round pick in 2015 and this pick (being conditional at the time of the trade). The condition – Philadelphia will receive the Lightning's first-round draft pick in 2015 if it is not the first overall selection – was converted on March 30, 2015 when Tampa Bay qualified for the 2015 Stanley Cup playoffs ensuring that this pick could not be a lottery selection.
- ^{b} The Anaheim Ducks' second-round pick went to the Columbus Blue Jackets as the result of a trade on March 2, 2015 that sent James Wisniewski and Detroit's third-round pick in 2015 to Anaheim in exchange for Rene Bourque, William Karlsson and this pick.
- The Columbus Blue Jackets' fourth-round pick went to the Los Angeles Kings as the result of a trade on June 27, 2015 that sent a fourth-round pick in 2015 (104th overall) and a sixth-round pick in 2016 to Philadelphia in exchange for this pick.
  Philadelphia previously acquired this pick as the result of a trade on June 23, 2014 that sent Scott Hartnell to Columbus in exchange for R.J. Umberger and this pick.
- ^{c} The Minnesota Wild's fifth-round pick went to the Columbus Blue Jackets as the result of a trade on March 2, 2015 that sent Jordan Leopold to Minnesota in exchange for Justin Falk and this pick.
