= John Scott (ice hockey, born 1982) =

Canadian ice hockey player (born 1982)

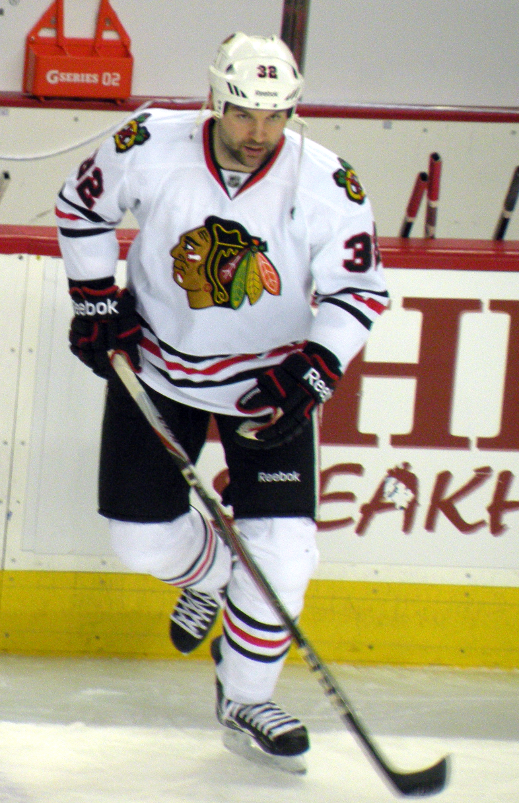
- Scott with the Chicago Blackhawks in 2012
- Born: September 26, 1982 (age 44) Edmonton, Alberta, Canada
- Height: 6 ft 8 in (203 cm)
- Weight: 260 lb (118 kg; 18 st 8 lb)
- Position: Left wing
- Shot: Left
- Played for: Minnesota Wild; Chicago Blackhawks; New York Rangers; Buffalo Sabres; San Jose Sharks; Arizona Coyotes; Montreal Canadiens
- NHL draft: Undrafted
- Playing career: 2006–2016

John Howard Scott (born September 26, 1982) is a Canadian former professional ice hockey defenceman and winger. A professional player for nearly 10 seasons, Scott saw National Hockey League (NHL) action with the Minnesota Wild, Chicago Blackhawks, New York Rangers, San Jose Sharks, Buffalo Sabres, Arizona Coyotes and Montreal Canadiens. Scott was born in Edmonton, Alberta, but grew up in St. Catharines, Ontario. He graduated from Michigan Technological University in 2006.

Scott gained prominence in January 2016 when, after an online campaign, he was named captain of the Pacific Division team for the 2016 NHL All-Star Game, despite only having scored five goals in his career, and only one assist in his time with the Coyotes. Despite a trade to the Montreal Canadiens, and subsequently being sent down to the St. John's IceCaps, then the Canadiens' AHL affiliate, the NHL confirmed on January 19, 2016, that Scott would participate in the 2016 NHL All-Star Game as the captain of the Pacific Division. Scott scored two goals in the tournament that helped his team advance to the finals where they were winners by a score of 1–0, and was voted the Most Valuable Player.

== Playing career ==
While growing up in Ontario, Scott was a Boston Bruins fan and decided to be a defenceman following Ray Bourque. Undrafted, Scott committed to a four-year collegiate hockey career with Michigan Tech in the Western Collegiate Hockey Association, hoping to at least have a degree if his hockey career did not pan out. As an enforcing physical defenceman, Scott recorded 19 points with 347 penalty minutes in his time with the Huskies. Prior to his senior year, Scott was involved in an automobile accident while driving under the influence; he was convicted and spent an unspecified amount of time in jail.

A free agent, Scott joined the Houston Aeros of the American Hockey League in 2006. During his first professional season in 2006–07 he was signed by the Minnesota Wild to an entry-level contract. The first time he was called up, he was unable to play in the game because it was against the Maple Leafs in Toronto, and he did not have his passport. His first NHL game came one month later on January 3, 2009, in Detroit against the Red Wings.

In the 2009–10 season Scott scored his first NHL goal on November 15, 2009, against Michael Leighton of the Carolina Hurricanes in a 5–4 shoot out loss.

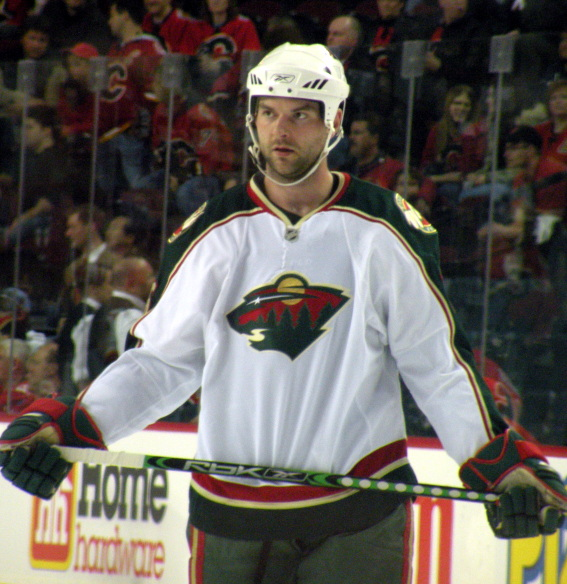
Scott with the Minnesota Wild in March 2009

On July 1, 2010, Scott left the Wild as a free agent and signed a two-year contract with the newly crowned Stanley Cup champion Chicago Blackhawks. On April 17, 2011, after being a healthy scratch for the first two games of the first round of the 2011 playoffs, Scott made his Stanley Cup playoff debut in game three of the series against the Presidents' Trophy-winning Vancouver Canucks, replacing the injured Bryan Bickell. After playing his normal wing position in game three's 3–2 loss, Scott was moved to defense for games four and five after Brent Seabrook suffered a concussion in game three. After Seabrook's return in game six of the series, Scott was moved from defense back to wing. After the Blackhawks recovered from their 3–0 series deficit by winning games four, five and six to force a game seven, Scott was labeled as a healthy scratch for the seventh game as the Blackhawks would lose the game 2–1 in overtime for a 4–3 series defeat.

In the second year of his contract in the 2011–12 season, Scott was dealt at the trade deadline towards the end of the season to the New York Rangers for a fifth-round draft pick in 2012 on February 27, 2012.

On July 1, 2012, Scott agreed to terms on a one-year deal with the Buffalo Sabres. On May 20, 2013, the Sabres re-signed Scott to a one-year contract extension worth $750,000.

On October 31, 2013, Scott was suspended seven games for an illegal check to the head of the Bruins' winger Loui Eriksson a week prior.

On July 2, 2014, Scott signed as a free agent to a one-year contract with the San Jose Sharks.

On October 26, 2014, against the Anaheim Ducks, Scott was subbed in via legal line change, and immediately began fighting Tim Jackman without attempting to play the puck, though head coach Todd McLellan stated Scott had already been on the ice at the time, and the fight escalated into a line-brawl. The next day, he was suspended for the next two games; it was officially recorded as for "leaving the bench on a legal line change and starting an altercation". According to the NHL's Department of Player Safety video, Scott said he left the bench with the desire to fight Jackman. On December 24, Scott was suspended for four games as "punishment for punching an unsuspecting opponent and causing an injury" on December 22 according to the NHL's Department of Player Safety. The punch/hit with stick was, again, on Jackman.

=== All-Star season ===
On July 10, 2015, Scott signed a one-year contract with the Arizona Coyotes.

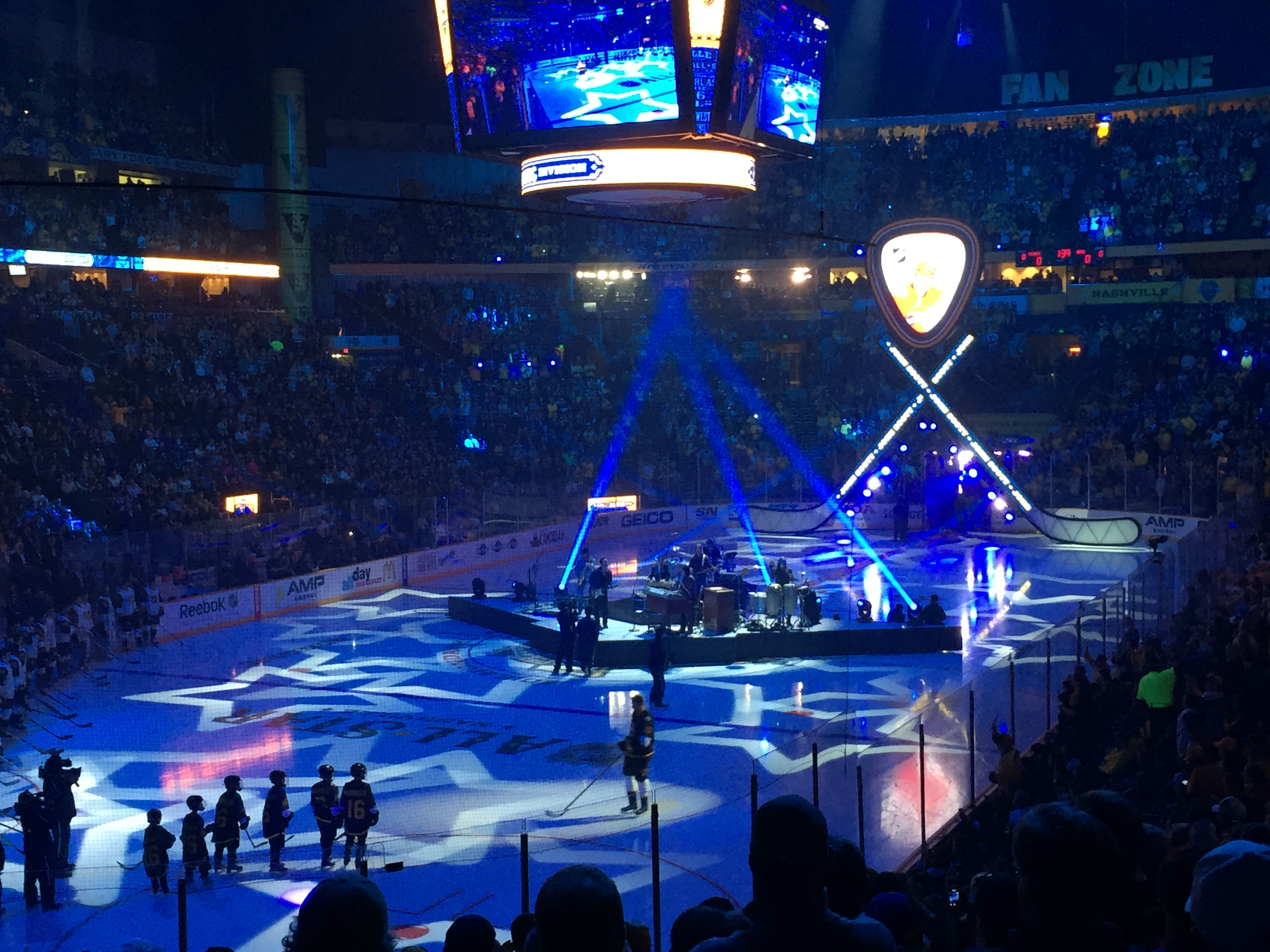
Scott's entrance at the 2016 NHL All-Star Game

In the 2015–16 season, on January 2, 2016, Scott was announced as the winner of the NHL All Star Game fan vote, as the captain for the team representing the Pacific Division of the Western Conference. Scott received the most votes of any player, despite having only recorded one point in 11 games played with the Coyotes (Scott spent much of the season as a healthy scratch) and scoring five goals in his entire career up to this point. The situation was compared to Rory Fitzpatrick's All-Star campaign in 2007, in which fans vote for a player who would not conventionally be chosen as an All-Star to highlight a role player.

The Sports Network (TSN) analyst Bob McKenzie reported that the NHL and the Coyotes had requested that Scott remove himself from the All-Star team. After being advised of the campaign, Scott made a statement to NHL fans, saying "Listen. I don't deserve this. Vote for my teammates." After he was declared the winner of the fan vote, Scott decided that he would play in the game.

On January 15, Scott was traded to the Montreal Canadiens along with Victor Bartley for Jarred Tinordi and Stefan Fournier. After Scott was traded, the Canadiens sent him down to their then American Hockey League (AHL) affiliate, the St. John's IceCaps. Arizona's general manager Don Maloney insisted the trade was a business move, and not an attempt at keeping Scott out of the All-Star Game. Speculation surfaced that Scott was potentially to be ruled ineligible to be on the All-Star team because of his move to an AHL roster and to an NHL team in the Atlantic Division. On January 19, Scott was officially declared by the NHL to be the captain of the Pacific Division roster at the 2016 All-Star Game. Scott later penned an article for The Players' Tribune, entitled A Guy Like Me, in which he stated the NHL tried to persuade him not to play in the game.

During the All-Star Game, Scott scored two goals in the semifinal of the tournament to propel his team into the final—which the Pacific Division ultimately won, and was named All-Star Game most valuable player, despite not being included in the voting. When he was excluded, fans (including players such as Henrik Lundqvist and official team accounts for the Ottawa Senators, Philadelphia Flyers, Vancouver Canucks, and Edmonton Oilers among others) took to Twitter with the hashtag #VoteMVPScott. Faced with this overwhelming support, the NHL awarded Scott the title. Following the All-Star Game and Scott's election to MVP, the NHL amended its rule book to disqualify players from being named All-Star captains if they are injured or moved to the AHL.

Scott's helmet at the All-Star game was sent to the Hockey Hall of Fame, and Scott's agent was approached about a film based on Scott's career as well as several endorsement deals.

On April 3, Scott was called up from the St. John's IceCaps by the Canadiens. It was his first time back in the NHL since December 31, 2015. On April 5, Scott played in his first NHL game with the Canadiens, where he had three shots, seven hits, and two penalty minutes. Directly after the game he was given the option to return to St. John's to finish the season or return to Michigan to see his family for the first time in nearly two months. Scott returned home, ending his season.

On December 7, 2016, Scott announced his retirement from ice hockey in a Players' Tribune article titled Five Goals, Four Kids, One Hell of a Good Time.

== Personal life ==
Scott has a mechanical engineering degree from Michigan Technological University, where he played college hockey with the Michigan Tech Huskies. Sidelined by his career, Scott completed his degree program in 2010. Scott resides in Traverse City, Michigan, where he works at an engineering firm. Scott and his wife, a fellow Michigan Tech student who graduated in biomedical engineering, have seven daughters, including a set of identical twins who were born a week after his All-Star Game appearance.

Scott's autobiography, A Guy Like Me: Fighting to Make the Cut, was released December 27, 2016. In 2017, he was baptized as a Catholic and discusses this, among other things, in his podcast.

== In the media and legacy ==
After gaining attention as a write-in for the All Star Game captaincy, Scott was discouraged from participating by the NHL yet ultimately took part and was chosen as the MVP after winning the tournament. Following the game, it was reported that Mandalay Sports Media acquired the rights to create a movie about the enforcer. The film script will be written by Mitch Albom, who is a sportswriter for the Detroit Free Press and a regular on ESPN's Sports Reporters and SportsCenter. He has written three movies, four plays and seven books but explained that each project is different. According to Albom, Scott's story is comparable to that of the fictional Rocky Balboa. As of February 2019, Scott has confirmed that casting has almost concluded.

In May 2019, Scott confirmed on the Barstool Sports podcast Spittin' Chiclets with Paul Bissonnette and Ryan Whitney that both Hugh Jackman and Will Arnett were in discussions to star in the film. Da Beauty League, a recreational summer ice hockey league that features numerous NHL stars, named its championship cup the "John Scott Cup" and awarded Scott an honorary commissioner position in the league. The league's logo is a silhouette of Scott.

In November 2017, Scott appeared in an episode of the TV series S.W.A.T. called "Imposters"; he portrayed Bobby Strock, an ice hockey player who needs protection from the show's protagonists after receiving death threats for injuring a popular hometown player on a dirty hit.

In January 2019, Radiolab released a podcast about Scott and his All-Star Game appearance titled "The Punchline".

In October 2023, Scott joined NBC Sports Chicago as a studio analyst for Chicago Blackhawks pre- and postgame shows.

== Career statistics ==
=== Regular season and playoffs ===
			Regular season					Playoffs
Season	Team	League	GP	G	A	Pts	PIM	GP	G	A	Pts	PIM
2001–02	Chicago Freeze	NAHL	53	4	8	12	240	—	—	—	—	—
2002–03	Michigan Tech	WCHA	31	1	3	4	64	—	—	—	—	—
2003–04	Michigan Tech	WCHA	35	1	3	4	100	—	—	—	—	—
2004–05	Michigan Tech	WCHA	36	2	4	6	101	—	—	—	—	—
2005–06	Michigan Tech	WCHA	24	3	2	5	82	—	—	—	—	—
2006–07	Houston Aeros	AHL	65	1	5	6	107	—	—	—	—	—
2007–08	Houston Aeros	AHL	64	3	0	3	184	5	0	0	0	13
2008–09	Minnesota Wild	NHL	20	0	1	1	21	—	—	—	—	—
2008–09	Houston Aeros	AHL	44	2	2	4	111	—	—	—	—	—
2009–10	Minnesota Wild	NHL	51	1	1	2	90	—	—	—	—	—
2010–11	Chicago Blackhawks	NHL	40	0	1	1	72	4	0	0	0	22
2011–12	Chicago Blackhawks	NHL	29	0	1	1	48	—	—	—	—	—
2011–12	New York Rangers	NHL	6	0	0	0	5	—	—	—	—	—
2012–13	Buffalo Sabres	NHL	34	0	0	0	69	—	—	—	—	—
2013–14	Buffalo Sabres	NHL	56	1	0	1	125	—	—	—	—	—
2014–15	San Jose Sharks	NHL	38	3	1	4	87	—	—	—	—	—
2015–16	Arizona Coyotes	NHL	11	0	1	1	25	—	—	—	—	—
2015–16	St. John's IceCaps	AHL	27	2	2	4	85	—	—	—	—	—
2015–16	Montreal Canadiens	NHL	1	0	0	0	2	—	—	—	—	—
NHL totals			286	5	6	11	544	4	0	0	0	22

== Awards and achievements ==
Award	Year(s) awarded
NHL All-Star Game	2016
NHL All-Star Game MVP	2016
