= James Neal (ice hockey) =

Canadian ice hockey player (born 1987)

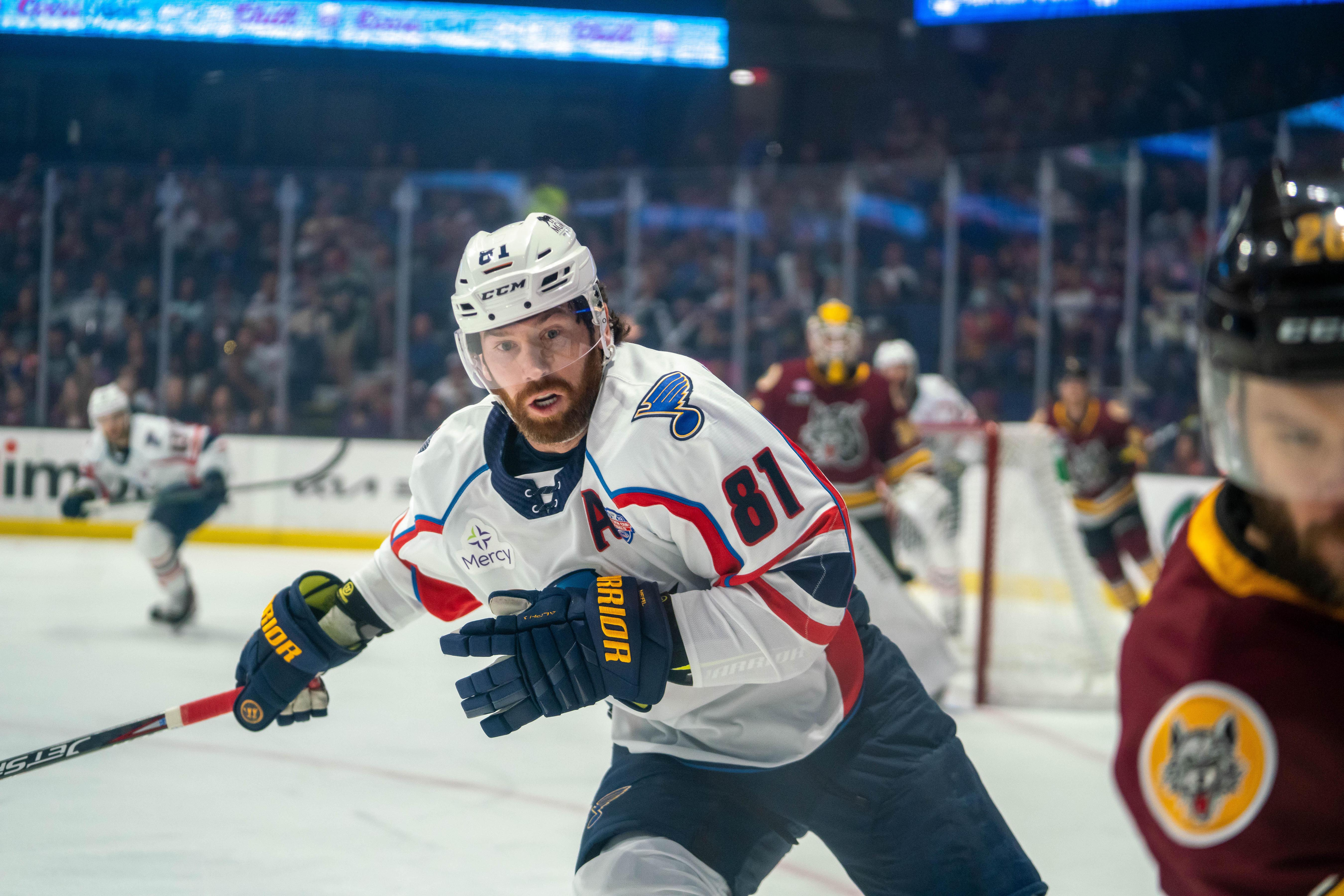
- Neal with the Springfield Thunderbirds in 2022
- Born: September 3, 1987 (age 38) Whitby, Ontario, Canada
- Height: 6 ft 3 in (191 cm)
- Weight: 212 lb (96 kg; 15 st 2 lb)
- Position: Winger
- Shot: Left
- Played for: Dallas Stars; Pittsburgh Penguins; Nashville Predators; Vegas Golden Knights; Calgary Flames; Edmonton Oilers; St. Louis Blues
- National team: Canada
- NHL draft: 33rd overall, 2005; Dallas Stars
- Playing career: 2007–2022

James Neal (born September 3, 1987) is a Canadian former professional ice hockey winger. He played 14 seasons in the National Hockey League (NHL) for the Dallas Stars, Pittsburgh Penguins, Nashville Predators, Vegas Golden Knights, Calgary Flames, Edmonton Oilers, and St. Louis Blues.

While playing junior ice hockey with the Plymouth Whalers of the Ontario Hockey League (OHL), he was selected in the second round, 33rd overall, by the Dallas Stars in the 2005 NHL entry draft. After one season with the Stars' American Hockey League (AHL) affiliate, the Iowa Stars, Neal played his NHL rookie year with Dallas in 2008–09. During his third NHL season, he was traded to the Penguins, where he played four seasons before being traded to the Predators.

After three seasons with the Predators, Neal was selected in the 2017 NHL expansion draft by the Golden Knights. A free agent after one year in Vegas, Neal signed with the Flames in July 2018 before being traded to the Edmonton Oilers just over a year later, where he played two seasons.

== Playing career ==
=== Minor ===
Neal started in the CYO in Oshawa, and grew up playing minor ice hockey for the Whitby Wildcats of the Ontario Minor Hockey Association (OMHA)'s Eastern AAA League. He played in the 2001 Quebec International Pee-Wee Hockey Tournament with Whitby. Among his minor hockey coaches was NHL and TSN broadcaster Bob McKenzie. His father, Peter, coached him for the major part of his minor hockey career. After his midget season, he was selected by the Plymouth Whalers in the third round, 80th overall, of the 2003 Ontario Hockey League (OHL) Priority Selection. Before joining the major junior ranks, he was assigned to the Bowmanville Eagles, a Junior A club of the Ontario Hockey Association (OHA), for the 2003–04 season.

=== Junior ===
Following his rookie season in the OHL, Neal was selected in the second round, 33rd overall, of the 2005 NHL entry draft by the Dallas Stars. Competing in his first NHL training camp, the Stars returned him to junior, where he recorded 21 goals and 58 points with Plymouth in 2005–06. Although Neal was returned to junior following the Stars' 2006 training camp, he was signed by the club to a three-year, entry-level contract in late October 2006. He recorded a junior career-high 27 goals and 65 points over 45 games in 2006–07. During the season, he was chosen to represent the Western Conference in the 2007 OHL All-Star Game and scored a goal. He also helped Plymouth win the OHL title, scoring the championship winning goal in overtime in Game 6 against the Sudbury Wolves. He led all tournament scorers with five goals in the Memorial Cup, held in Vancouver.

=== Professional ===
==== Dallas Stars (2008–2011) ====
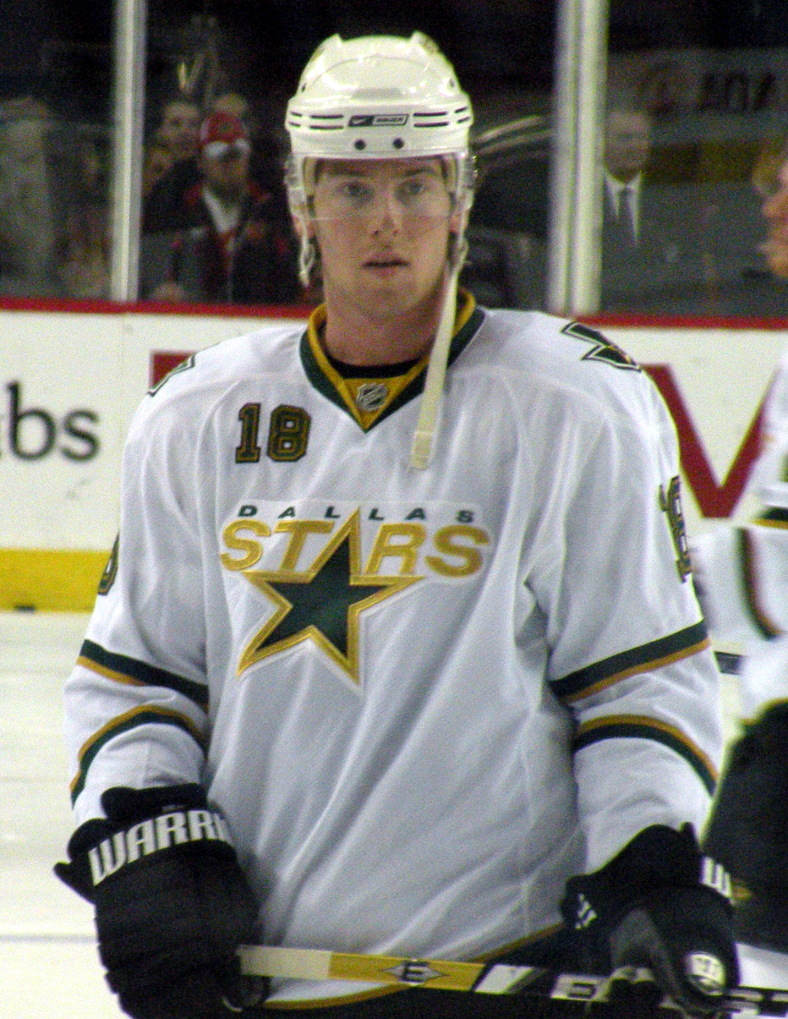
Neal with the Stars in March 2009

After turning professional for the 2007–08 season, Neal played with Dallas' American Hockey League (AHL) affiliate, the Iowa Stars. In 62 games, he scored 18 goals and 19 assists for 37 points. The next season, 2008–09, he scored his first career NHL goal in his first NHL game on October 10, 2008, against Pascal Leclaire of the Columbus Blue Jackets. His first multi-point NHL game came on November 26, 2008, with a two-goal effort against the Minnesota Wild. Famously, Neal's first NHL fight proved to be a memorable and quick victory. On December 18, 2008, he was challenged to a fight by Columbus forward Derick Brassard after Neal checked Blue Jacket Fedor Tyutin hard into the corner of the Columbus defensive zone in the first period. Neal obliged, and produced a gash near Brassard's left eye with a powerful right punch. Brassard quickly called the fight off, where it was later disclosed that he had dislocated his right shoulder which ended his season. Five days later, Neal scored his first NHL hat-trick during a game against the Toronto Maple Leafs on December 23, 2008, in an 8–2 win. His early season performance led to a nomination to the YoungStars roster for the 2008 NHL All-Star Game in Montreal. He also broke the Stars' team record for goals scored by a rookie (not including the franchise's years as the Minnesota North Stars), surpassing Jussi Jokinen's record of 17 goals set in 2005–06, in a 10–2 rout of the New York Rangers on February 6, 2009. He completed the campaign with 24 goals and 37 points.

In the Stars' 2009–10 season opener, on October 3, 2009, Neal recorded Dallas' first and second goals of the season against the Nashville Predators. He improved to 55 points in his second NHL season. On September 16, 2010, just prior to the commencement of the 2010–11 season, Neal signed a two-year contract extension with the Stars worth $2.25 million in the first year and $3.5 million in the second.

==== Pittsburgh Penguins (2011–2014) ====
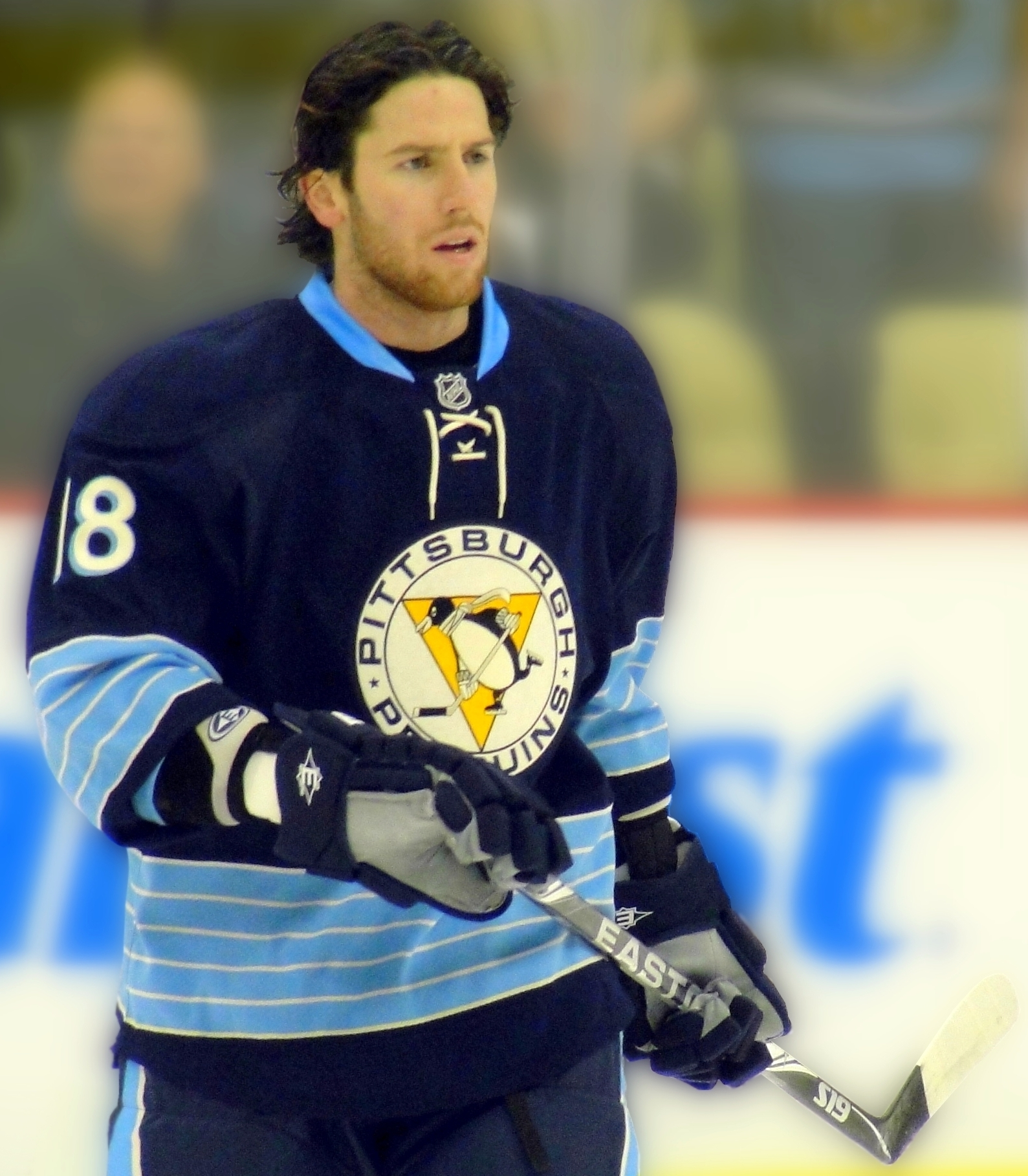
Neal with the Penguins in March 2011, weeks after he was traded to the team

Leading up to the 2011 trade deadline, on February 21, Neal was traded to the Pittsburgh Penguins (along with defenceman Matt Niskanen) in exchange for defenceman Alex Goligoski. Neal scored his first career Stanley Cup playoff goal on April 20 against the Tampa Bay Lightning in double overtime to give Pittsburgh a 3–1 series lead.

On February 19, 2012, one day after scoring 30 goals for the first time in his career, Neal signed a six-year contract extension with an average annual value of $5 million. He scored his second career hat-trick, and first as a Pittsburgh Penguin, in an 8–4 win against the Winnipeg Jets on March 20, 2012. Neal had a break-out season in 2011–12, finishing with 40 goals and 41 assists for 81 points in 80 games. The 40 goals scored was second on the Penguins (only behind the 50 from teammate Evgeni Malkin) and fourth in the league overall (behind Marian Gaborik’s 41 goals, Evgeni Malkin’s 50 goals and the league-leading 60 goals by Steven Stamkos, respectively.

On May 24, 2013, in game 5 of the second round of the 2013 playoffs, he scored his first career playoff hat-trick, against the Ottawa Senators. The Penguins defeated the Senators in the second round in five games before getting swept in the Eastern Conference Finals by the Boston Bruins.

==== Nashville Predators (2014–2017) ====
On June 27, 2014, during the 2014 NHL entry draft, Neal was traded to the Nashville Predators in exchange for Patric Hörnqvist and Nick Spaling. He scored his first goal with the Predators on October 17, 2014, in a 2–0 victory over the Winnipeg Jets.

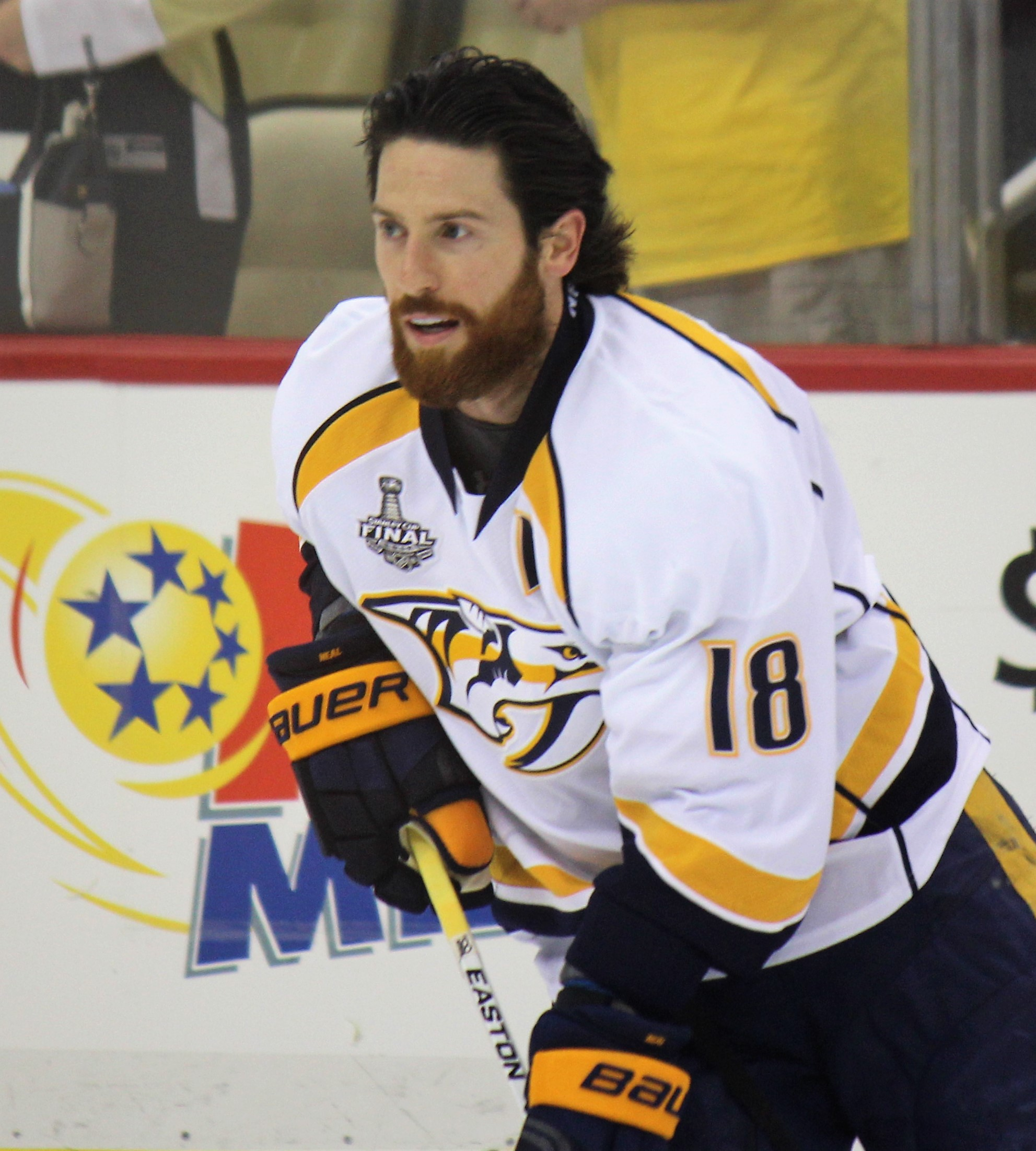
Neal with the Predators during the 2017 Stanley Cup Final

Neal had an impressive year in 2015–16, scoring 31 goals and 58 points and setting a new Predators franchise single-season record for plus-minus with +27. In the 2016–17 season, Neal helped lead the Predators to the organization's first Stanley Cup Final appearance. The Predators faced Neal's old team, the Pittsburgh Penguins, but lost the series four games to two, with the player he was traded for, Patric Hörnqvist, scoring the game-winning goal in the deciding Game 6.

==== Vegas Golden Knights (2017–2018) ====
On June 21, 2017, Neal was selected by the Vegas Golden Knights in the expansion draft as the Predators' unprotected player. After attending the Golden Knights' first training camp, Neal secured a top-line role to open the 2017–18 season.

On October 6, 2017, he scored the franchise's first two goals in a 2–1 comeback victory over the Dallas Stars, helping the Golden Knights achieve victory in their debut. In 71 games for the Golden Knights' successful inaugural season, Neal had 25 goals and 19 assists, placing fourth on the club in goals.

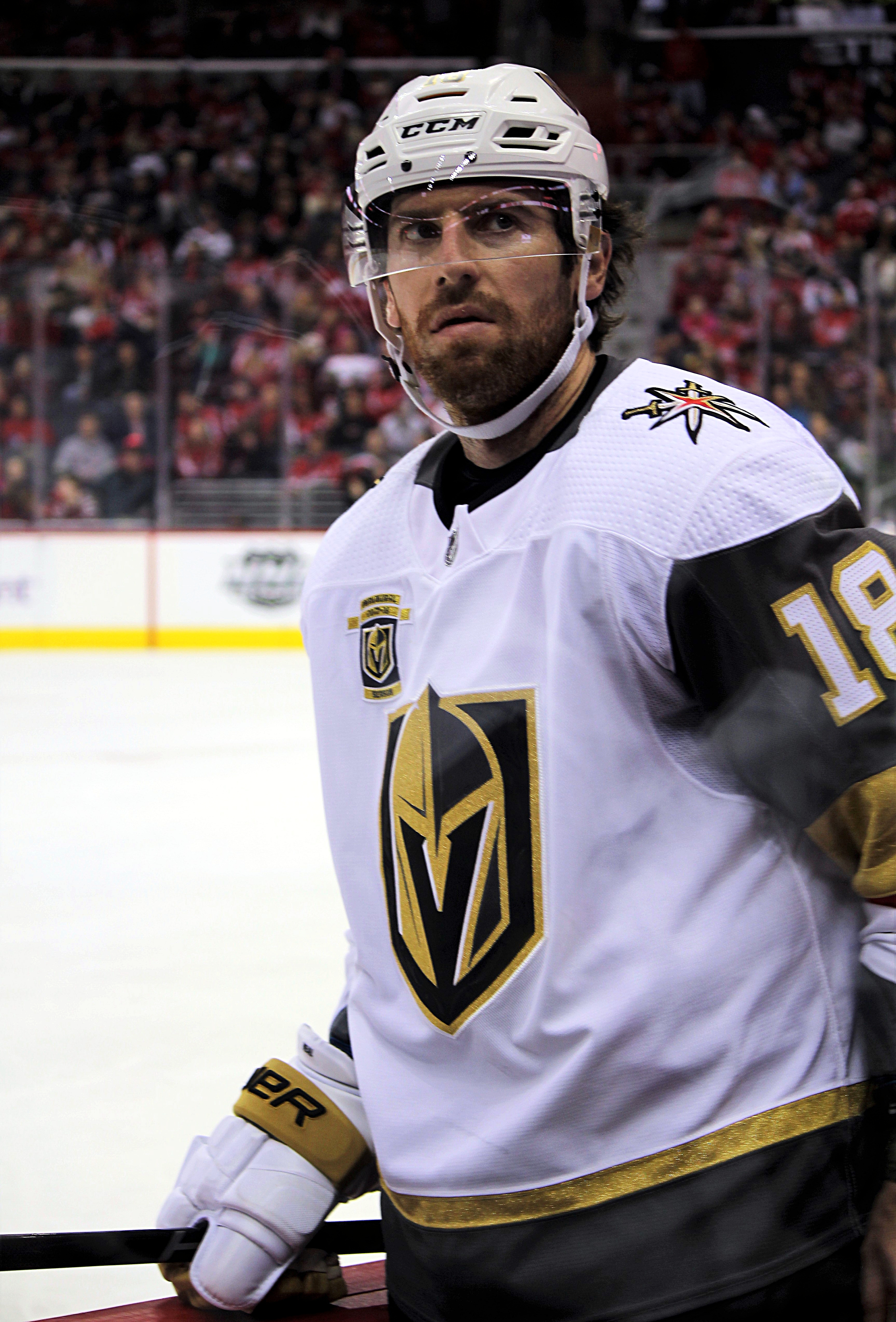
Neal with the Vegas Golden Knights during their inaugural season in 2018

In the playoffs, Neal helped the Golden Knights claim the Western Conference title and secure his second successive appearance in the Stanley Cup Final. He contributed with 6 goals and 11 points in 20 games before losing to the Washington Capitals in five games.

==== Calgary Flames (2018–2019) ====
After leaving Vegas as a free agent, on July 2, 2018, Neal signed a five-year, $28.75 million contract with the Calgary Flames. Neal severely underwhelmed in his season with Calgary, only scoring a total of 19 points, less than his lowest single-season goal total on any of his previous teams. He was benched on multiple occasions during the campaign, including being healthy scratched prior to a pivotal game 5 Stanley Cup Playoffs first round matchup against the Colorado Avalanche.

==== Edmonton Oilers (2019–2021) ====
On July 19, 2019, the Flames traded Neal to the Edmonton Oilers in exchange for Milan Lucic and a 2020 conditional third-round pick. Both Neal and Lucic had struggled to live up to the expectations attached to their large salaries on their previous teams and the trade gave both players a chance for a fresh start. On October 8, 2019, Neal scored four goals in a game against the New York Islanders, setting a franchise record for the most goals in the first three games of a season, with six goals. Neal scored 11 goals in the month of October 2019 alone.

However, Neal's production began to tail off as the season progressed, as he battled injury and his ice-time decreased. Neal missed 16 games with an ankle injury he suffered against the Flames on January 29, 2020, and he failed to score a single goal in the 13 games he did play in 2020.

At the time of the Lucic-for-Neal trade, the Flames and Oilers had agreed that, should Neal score at least 21 goals in the 2019-20 NHL season and Lucic score at least 10 fewer goals than Neal, the Oilers owed the Flames a third-round draft choice in the 2020 NHL entry draft. Due to the abrupt and incomplete finish to the 2019-20 season, the Flames and Oilers remained at an impasse over how to resolve the trade condition, given that Neal finished with 19 goals (two fewer than the required threshold) but was on pace to surpass 21 if the season played to its 82-game conclusion. On July 31, 2020, the NHL ruled that the Oilers owed the Flames a third-round draft choice in Edmonton's choice of either the 2020 or 2021 NHL Entry Drafts as a result of a trade condition the two teams had made as part of the Lucic/Neal swap.

On July 27, 2021, the Oilers placed Neal on waivers for the purpose of buying out the remaining two years of his contract.

==== St. Louis Blues (2021–2022) ====
As a free agent over the summer and approaching the 2021–22 season, Neal was invited to attend the St. Louis Blues training camp on a professional tryout contract on September 18, 2021. On October 9, Neal agreed to a one-year contract with the Blues. On January 2, 2022, Neal was placed on waivers by St. Louis.

As a free agent over the summer and approaching the 2022–23 season, Neal was invited to attend the Columbus Blue Jackets training camp on a professional tryout contract on September 1, 2022. He was released from his PTO a month later, on October 3.

== International play ==
Medal record

Ice hockey

Representing Canada

IIHF World Championship
Silver medal – second place	2009 Switzerland	

World Junior Championships
Gold medal – first place	2007 Canada	

In the 2006 off-season, Neal was invited to the Canadian national junior team's summer evaluation camp. His physical presence and hard-hitting impressed Canada's coaches, and he was brought back to the team's selection camp in December 2006. His play earned him a spot on the club for the 2007 World Junior Championships in Sweden, where he helped Canada to a gold medal. Two years later, Neal moved on to Canada's men's team for the 2009 IIHF World Championship in Switzerland. He scored three points in as many contests, helping Canada to a silver medal finish in the tournament. In 2011, he again represented Canada at the 2011 IIHF World Championship in Slovakia.

== Personal life ==
Neal has three younger brothers—Michael, Peter and Nicholas—who also play hockey. Michael was drafted by the Dallas Stars in the fifth round, 149th overall, of the 2007 NHL entry draft; Peter last played with the Knoxville Ice Bears in the Southern Professional Hockey League in 2014–15 season; and Nicholas last played for the Cobourg Cougars of the Ontario Junior Hockey League in 2013–14.

Neal also has a younger sister named Rebecca. In March 2012, he was featured on an episode of NHL 36, which followed him for 36 hours.

== Career statistics ==
=== Regular season and playoffs ===
			regular season					Playoffs
Season	Team	League	GP	G	A	Pts	PIM	GP	G	A	Pts	PIM
2002–03	Whitby Wildcats U16 AAA	ETAHL	47	18	23	41	47	—	—	—	—	—
2003–04	Bowmanville Eagles	OPJHL	43	28	27	55	54	15	12	3	15	22
2003–04	Plymouth Whalers	OHL	9	2	4	6	0	—	—	—	—	—
2004–05	Plymouth Whalers	OHL	67	18	26	44	32	4	1	1	2	6
2005–06	Plymouth Whalers	OHL	66	21	37	58	109	13	9	7	16	33
2006–07	Plymouth Whalers	OHL	45	27	38	65	94	9	7	4	11	32
2007–08	Iowa Stars	AHL	62	18	19	37	63	—	—	—	—	—
2008–09	Dallas Stars	NHL	77	24	13	37	51	—	—	—	—	—
2008–09	Manitoba Moose	AHL	5	4	1	5	2	—	—	—	—	—
2009–10	Dallas Stars	NHL	78	27	28	55	64	—	—	—	—	—
2010–11	Dallas Stars	NHL	59	21	18	39	60	—	—	—	—	—
2010–11	Pittsburgh Penguins	NHL	20	1	5	6	6	7	1	1	2	6
2011–12	Pittsburgh Penguins	NHL	81	40	41	81	87	5	2	4	6	12
2012–13	Pittsburgh Penguins	NHL	40	21	15	36	26	13	6	4	10	8
2013–14	Pittsburgh Penguins	NHL	59	27	34	61	26	13	2	2	4	24
2014–15	Nashville Predators	NHL	67	23	14	37	57	6	4	1	5	8
2015–16	Nashville Predators	NHL	82	31	27	58	65	14	4	4	8	8
2016–17	Nashville Predators	NHL	70	23	18	41	35	22	6	3	9	14
2017–18	Vegas Golden Knights	NHL	71	25	19	44	24	20	6	5	11	12
2018–19	Calgary Flames	NHL	63	7	12	19	28	4	0	0	0	0
2019–20	Edmonton Oilers	NHL	55	19	12	31	12	4	2	1	3	0
2020–21	Edmonton Oilers	NHL	29	5	5	10	11	2	0	0	0	0
2021–22	St. Louis Blues	NHL	19	2	2	4	0	—	—	—	—	—
2021–22	Springfield Thunderbirds	AHL	28	14	12	26	10	17	4	8	12	10
NHL totals			869	296	263	559	581	110	33	25	58	92

=== International ===
Year	Team	Event	Result	GP	G	A	Pts	PIM
2005	Canada	U18	2nd place, silver medalist(s)	6	1	1	2	6
2007	Canada	WJC	1st place, gold medalist(s)	6	0	0	0	8
2009	Canada	WC	2nd place, silver medalist(s)	3	1	2	3	2
2011	Canada	WC	5th	6	2	3	5	10
Junior totals				12	1	1	2	14
Senior totals				9	3	5	8	12

== Awards and honours ==
Award	Year
NHL
YoungStars Game	2009
All-Star Game	2012, 2016, 2018
NHL First All-Star team	2011–12
