= Evgeny Kuznetsov =

Russian ice hockey player (born 1992)

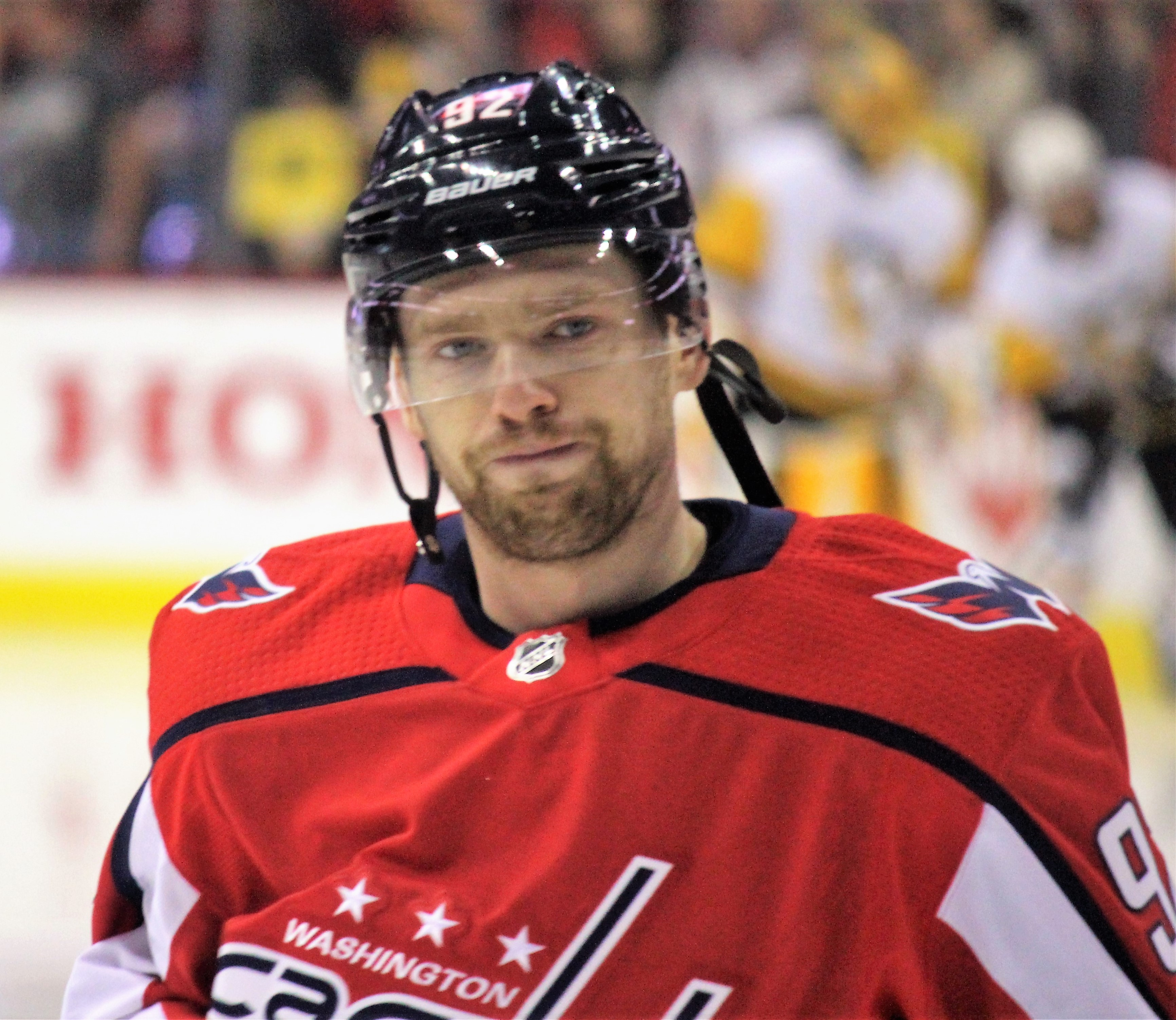
- Kuznetsov with the Washington Capitals in April 2018
- Born: 19 May 1992 (age 34) Chelyabinsk, Russia
- Height: 6 ft 1 in (185 cm)
- Weight: 216 lb (98 kg; 15 st 6 lb)
- Position: forward
- Shoots: Left
- KHL team Former teams: Sibir Novosibirsk; Traktor Chelyabinsk; Washington Capitals; Carolina Hurricanes; SKA Saint Petersburg; Metallurg Magnitogorsk; Salavat Yulaev Ufa
- National team: Russia
- NHL draft: 26th overall, 2010; Washington Capitals
- Playing career: 2010–present

Yevgeny Evgenyevich Kuznetsov (Russian: Евгений Евгеньевич Кузнецов; born 19 May 1992) is a Russian professional ice hockey player who is a forward for Sibir Novosibirsk of the Kontinental Hockey League (KHL). He previously played for the Washington Capitals and Carolina Hurricanes in the National Hockey League (NHL) and Traktor Chelyabinsk, SKA Saint Petersburg, Metallurg Magnitogorsk and Salavat Yulaev Ufa of the KHL. He has represented Russia in junior and senior level competitions on numerous occasions, winning gold medals at the 2011 World Junior Ice Hockey Championships, as well as at the 2012 IIHF World Championship and 2014 IIHF World Championship.

Kuznetsov won the Stanley Cup with the Capitals in 2018, leading the playoffs in point-scoring with 32 points, the most by any player in a single postseason since Evgeni Malkin in 2009. Kuznetsov is known for his bird celebration he used throughout the 2018 Stanley Cup playoffs, as well as the rest of his career, earning him the nickname "the Birdman."

== Playing career ==
Kuznetsov made his professional debut in the 2009–10 season with Traktor Chelyabinsk of the KHL. That season, he played 35 games, totaling eight points. After his performance for Traktor, he was ranked as the third-best European skater by the NHL Central Scouting Bureau for the 2010 NHL entry draft, where he was eventually selected in the first round, 26th overall, by the Washington Capitals.

In the 2011–12 season, Kuznetsov was selected to the KHL All-Star Game. During the season, he also won the Continental Cup and bronze medals with his team. It was reported that during the 2013–14 season, Kuznetsov earned $3.8 million to play for Traktor.

=== Washington Capitals ===
On 8 March 2014, Kuznetsov signed an entry-level contract with the Washington Capitals. On 25 March, he scored his first career NHL goal, which happened to be a short-handed goal, against the Los Angeles Kings with under a minute left to tie the game; the Capitals, however, eventually lost 5–4 in the shootout.

On 23 April 2015, Kuznetsov scored the first and second Stanley Cup playoff goals of his career against the New York Islanders. In the same game, he also had an assist in an eventual 5–1 Washington win. On 27 April 2015, he scored the game-winning goal in game seven of the Eastern Conference Quarter-finals against the Islanders in the same series, advancing the Capitals to a Conference Semi-finals match-up against the 2014–15 Presidents' Trophy-winning New York Rangers.

During the 2015–16 season, Kuznetsov was named to his first All-Star Game as a replacement for Alexander Ovechkin, who pulled out due to a lower-body injury.

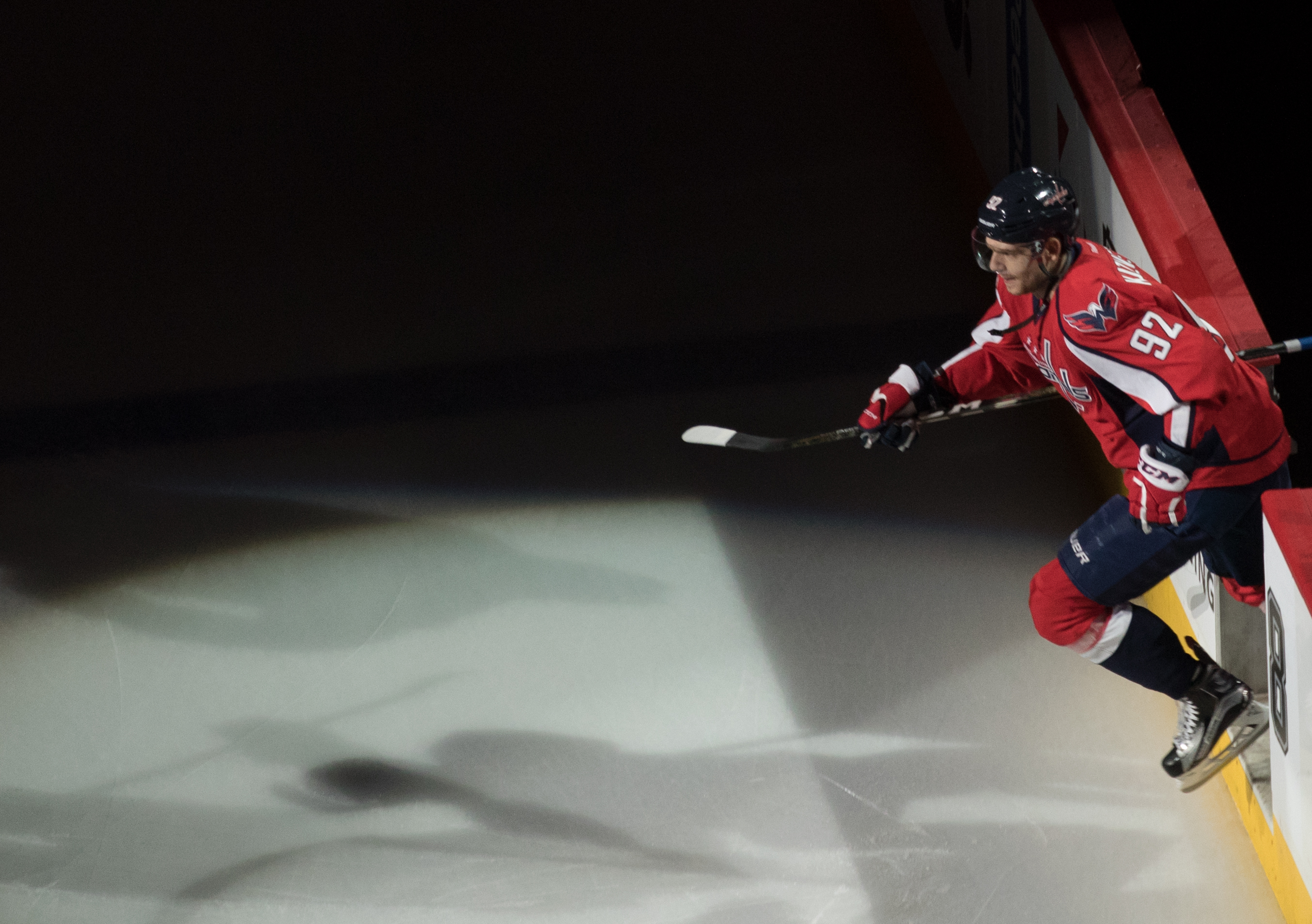
Kuznetsov steps on the ice prior to the start of game five of the 2017 First Round playoffs against the Toronto Maple Leafs.

On 2 July 2017, the Capitals re-signed Kuznetsov (a restricted free agent) to an eight-year, $62.4 million contract worth $7.8 million per season.

In 24 playoff games in 2018, Kuznetsov had 12 goals and 20 assists for a total of 32 points, second only to Evgeni Malkin in 2009 among players in the last 25 seasons of Stanley Cup playoffs. Kuznetsov's series-clinching overtime winner in game six against Pittsburgh secured the Capitals’ first berth in the Eastern Conference Finals since 1998, ending years of playoff failure against the Penguins. His four assists in game four of the Stanley Cup Final made him only the fourth NHL player to record that many in a finals game, the first in 22 years. Kuznetsov led the league with 32 points in 24 appearances in the 2018 postseason, but lost to linemate and team captain Alex Ovechkin in the Conn Smythe Trophy competition.

"In helping deliver a championship Washington had wanted for more than 40 years, Kuznetsov was arguably the Capitals' most instrumental player. The 26-year-old, fifth-year pro finished with a playoff-leading 32 points, including his 20th assist in Thursday night's series-clinching 4–3 win over the Vegas Golden Knights in Game 5."

— W.G. Ramirez, Associated Press

Members of the Professional Hockey Writers Association determined the winner of the Conn Smythe Trophy on a 5–3–1 basis, with the final tally determined by the NHL with ten minutes remaining in game five of the finals. All but two of the votes were cast for Washington Capitals players, with Kuznetsov and Ovechkin receiving inverse totals – Ovechkin took 13 first-place votes and five-second place, while Kuznetsov received five first-place votes and 13-second place. Capitals goalie Braden Holtby was the third-place choice of 16 voters. Golden Knights goalie Marc-André Fleury received the remaining two third-place votes.

Kuznetsov scored a power play goal and had three assists to power the Washington Capitals to a 5–2 win against the Vegas Golden Knights in a rematch of the 2018 Stanley Cup Final at Capital One Arena on 10 October 2018. Of his performance, teammate T.J. Oshie said: "I think [Kuznetsov is] up there with the top five players in the League. He just doesn't get the recognition for some reason. But you come watch a game, there's certain players that get people out of their seats and it's a joy to watch." Kuznetsov had the primary assist on each of the two goals by team captain Alexander Ovechkin, his 610th and 611th NHL career goals, surpassing Bobby Hull on the all-time goals list. Of playing with Ovechkin, Kuznetsov said:

It's pleasure to play with him. You may not understand right now but when you get older, you understand what kind of guy he is. He's one of the best players in probably whole history. He's gonna be in the Hall of Fame and maybe one of those pictures in Hall of Fame I'm gonna be somewhere around him just after we score.

On 14 September 2019, the NHL suspended Kuznetsov for three games for cocaine use after video surfaced on social media that showed Kuznetsov and another man sitting at a table that appeared to have lines of cocaine on it; the NHL termed the offense "inappropriate conduct."

During the 2023–24 season, on 5 February 2024, Kuznetsov entered the NHL Player Assistance Program. On 2 March, the NHL announced that Kuznetsov had been cleared by the Program to return to practice. Hours later, Kuznetsov was waived by the Capitals. On 4 March, Kuznetsov cleared waivers and was loaned to the Hershey Bears, the Capitals' American Hockey League (AHL) affiliate.

=== Carolina Hurricanes ===
On 8 March 2024, before playing a game with Hershey, Kuznetsov was traded by the Capitals to the Carolina Hurricanes in exchange for a 2025 third-round draft pick. In joining the Hurricanes, Kuznetsov posted 2 goals and 7 points through the final 20 regular season games. In helping the team reach the second round of the playoffs, Kuznetsov notched 4 goals and 6 points through 10 appearances.

On 17 July 2024, the Hurricanes placed Kuznetsov on unconditional waivers for the purpose of mutually terminating his contract, under which Kuznetsov had one more season. After going unclaimed he officially ended his tenure with the Hurricanes and became a free agent the following day.

=== SKA Saint Petersburg ===
As a free agent, Kuznetsov returned to his homeland, Russia, to resume his career in the KHL, agreeing to a four-year contract with SKA Saint Petersburg on 31 July 2024. In the 2024–25 season, Kuznetsov led SKA as club captain, however was limited to just 39 regular season games through injury in notching 37 points. Following elimination in the first-round of the playoffs, Kuznetsov and SKA mutually agreed to terminate the remainder of his contract on 9 April 2025.

=== Metallurg Magnitogorsk ===
On October 1, Kuznetsov opted to remain in the KHL, signing a one-year contract with Metallurg Magnitogorsk.

=== Sibir Novosibirsk ===
On 8 August 2026, Kuznetsov announced that he had signed a one-year contract with HC Sibir Novosibirsk.

== Player profile ==
Kuznetsov was considered one of the most accurate passers in the game. Capitals teammate Tom Wilson said of him, "He just tells me to put my stick on the ice and he'll hit it. It's a privilege to play with him. He's one of the best at his craft." Kuznetsov has played in the shadows of fellow Russian Alexander Ovechkin, but his talent began to gain attention.

Trotz considers Kuznetsov to be a highly intelligent player, saying, "Kuznetsov has an extremely high hockey IQ. He loves to study film. He sees what others don't." Teammate Lars Eller agrees: "Kuzy has a very high IQ. He’s a very smart player."

One of the most dynamic players, and he can take over the league if he wants to. I think he's that talented and sees the game better than anyone else.

— John Carlson, June 2018

Of his own approach to playing, the recognition he's getting from teammates on his talent, and his preference for fun over awards Kuznetsov says:

To be MVP, you have to work hard 365 [days] in a year, but I’m not ready for that. I want to have fun, and I want to make those risky plays when sometimes you don't have a play and you guys don't understand every time those plays. It's not easy to make. But to be MVP in this league, you have to play even better. You have to go next level. It's not easy. More important, you have to stay focused 365 [days], but that's not my style.

Kuznetsov has generated controversy around his celebrations after scoring goals. His "cellies" (hockey slang for "celebrations") have most prominently included the prancing bird – and earlier the kayak, push-ups, and playing dead. Kuznetsov debuted the bird dance at the 2016 World Cup when he scored an end-to-end goal against Matt Murray of Team North America. After taking a break from the celebration, his "joyful prancing bird celebration" reappeared in the 2018 NHL post-season. Kuznetsov claims he brought back the bird because his daughter "loves that stuff." Teammate Tom Wilson loves "to see the wings come out." As he sees it, "That means he's checked in and playing with fire. If he scores a big goal like that, I’m not going to tell him he can't. Do whatever you want with your celebration." Kuznetsov "lifted" the bird dance celebration from the FIFA soccer video game.

== International play ==
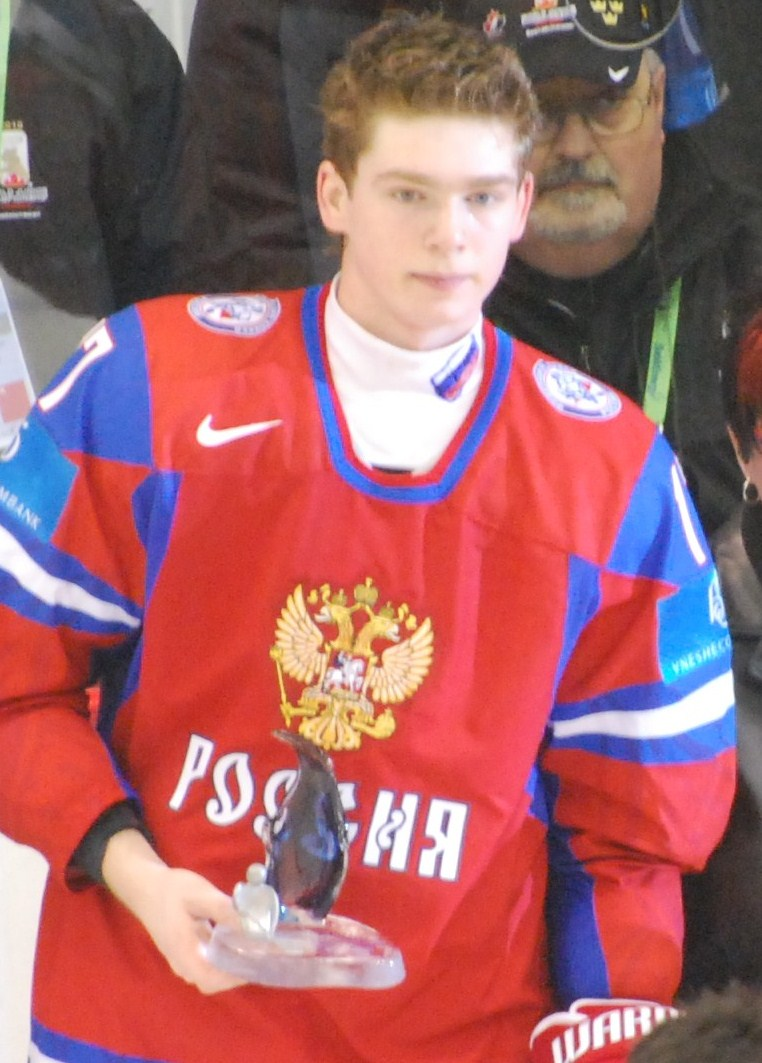
- Evgeny Kuznetsov accepting a post-game award at the 2010 World Junior Hockey Championships

Medal record

Ice hockey

Representing Russia

World Championships
| Gold medal – first place | 2012 Finland/Sweden | |
| Gold medal – first place | 2014 Belarus | |
| Bronze medal – third place | 2016 Russia | |
| Bronze medal – third place | 2017 Germany/France | |

World Junior Championships
| Gold medal – first place | 2011 United States | |
| Silver medal – second place | 2012 Canada | |

IIHF World U18 Championship
| Silver medal – second place | 2009 United States | |

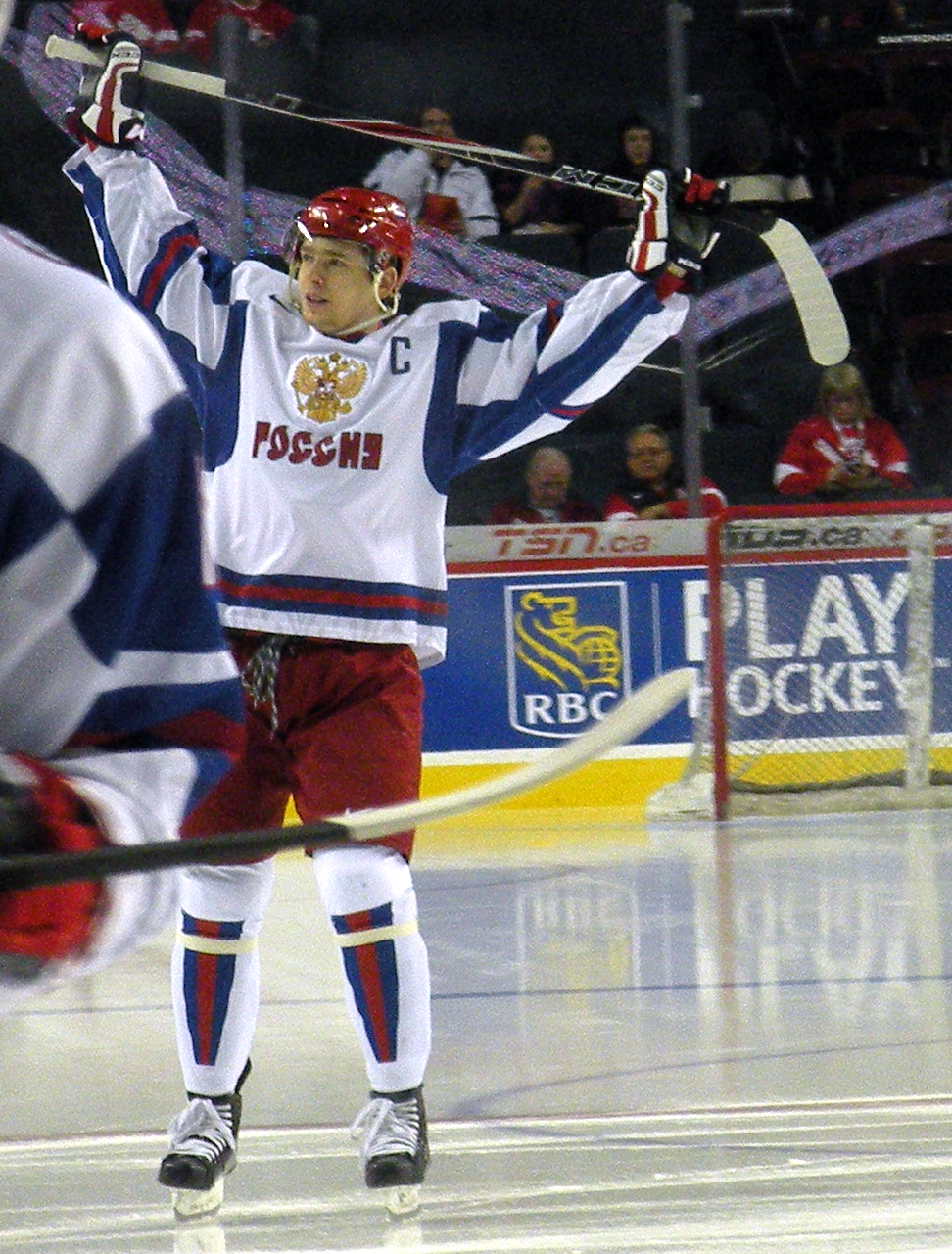
Kuznetsov during the 2012 World Junior Ice Hockey Championships.

Kuznetsov played for Russia at the 2010 World Junior Ice Hockey Championships held in Saskatchewan, Canada. He finished the tournament with two goals and was selected as the player of the game for Russia after the preliminary round game against Austria.

Kuznetsov again represented Russia in the 2011 World Junior Championships in Buffalo, New York. He was the only 18-year-old on the Russian team; every other player was 19. He finished second in the tournament in scoring, with four goals and seven assists in seven games. He also had three assists in the gold medal game, in which Russia overcame a 3–0 deficit in the third period against Canada to win 5–3. Kuznetsov was named by the tournament coaches as one of the three best players on his team, and was named to the tournament all-star team by the media. He was also named the best player in the match against Norway, in which he recorded one goal and one assist. He finished tied for second in the tournament in scoring, alongside teammate Vladimir Tarasenko, with four goals and seven assists.

Kuznetsov then served as team captain for Russia at the 2012 World Junior Championships, the third year in a row he participated in the tournament. On 29 December 2011, in a game against Latvia, Kuznetsov recorded three goals and six assists for nine points in an emphatic 14–0 win for Russia. This set a record for most points by a Russian player at the World Juniors, as well as the second-highest total in a game in the history of the tournament, one point behind Peter Forsberg of Sweden, who set the record in 1993.

On 23 August 2019, the IIHF announced that it had suspended Kuznetsov for four years after he had tested positive for cocaine, retroactive to 13 June 2019. He was stripped of his 2019 World Championship bronze medal as a result, but the Russian team was not sanctioned.

== Personal life ==
Kuznetsov married Anastasiya (Nastya) Kuznetsova (née Zinov'eva) in 2011 in a ceremony at Traktor Ice Arena. The couple have two children, a daughter and a son.

Kuznetsov had an older brother, Alexander, who was tragically killed when a May Day celebration turned violent in 2003. Evgeny was 10 years old, and has few memories of his brother.

Kuznetsov is a keen football fan and an avid supporter of Liverpool F.C.

== Career statistics ==
=== Regular season and playoffs ===
Bold indicates led league

| | | | Regular season | | | | | Playoffs |
| Season | Team | League | GP | G | A | Pts | PIM | GP | G | A | Pts | PIM |
|---|---|---|---|---|---|---|---|---|---|---|---|---|
| 2007–08 | Traktor–2 Chelyabinsk | RUS.3 | 2 | 0 | 0 | 0 | 0 | — | — | — | — | — |
| 2008–09 | Traktor–2 Chelyabinsk | RUS.3 | 22 | 5 | 11 | 16 | 40 | — | — | — | — | — |
| 2009–10 | Belye Medvedi Chelyabinsk | MHL | 9 | 4 | 12 | 16 | 8 | 2 | 1 | 2 | 3 | 4 |
| 2009–10 | Traktor Chelyabinsk | KHL | 35 | 2 | 6 | 8 | 10 | 4 | 1 | 0 | 1 | 0 |
| 2010–11 | Traktor Chelyabinsk | KHL | 44 | 17 | 15 | 32 | 30 | — | — | — | — | — |
| 2010–11 | Belye Medvedi Chelyabinsk | MHL | 8 | 10 | 5 | 15 | 4 | 5 | 0 | 2 | 2 | 10 |
| 2011–12 | Traktor Chelyabinsk | KHL | 49 | 19 | 21 | 40 | 30 | 12 | 7 | 2 | 9 | 10 |
| 2012–13 | Traktor Chelyabinsk | KHL | 51 | 19 | 25 | 44 | 42 | 25 | 5 | 6 | 11 | 28 |
| 2013–14 | Traktor Chelyabinsk | KHL | 31 | 8 | 13 | 21 | 12 | — | — | — | — | — |
| 2013–14 | Washington Capitals | NHL | 17 | 3 | 6 | 9 | 6 | — | — | — | — | — |
| 2014–15 | Washington Capitals | NHL | 80 | 11 | 26 | 37 | 24 | 14 | 5 | 2 | 7 | 8 |
| 2015–16 | Washington Capitals | NHL | 82 | 20 | 57 | 77 | 32 | 12 | 1 | 1 | 2 | 8 |
| 2016–17 | Washington Capitals | NHL | 82 | 19 | 40 | 59 | 46 | 13 | 5 | 5 | 10 | 8 |
| 2017–18 | Washington Capitals | NHL | 79 | 27 | 56 | 83 | 48 | 24 | 12 | **20** | **32** | 16 |
| 2018–19 | Washington Capitals | NHL | 76 | 21 | 51 | 72 | 50 | 7 | 1 | 5 | 6 | 2 |
| 2019–20 | Washington Capitals | NHL | 63 | 19 | 33 | 52 | 40 | 8 | 3 | 2 | 5 | 4 |
| 2020–21 | Washington Capitals | NHL | 41 | 9 | 20 | 29 | 18 | 3 | 0 | 0 | 0 | 0 |
| 2021–22 | Washington Capitals | NHL | 79 | 24 | 54 | 78 | 44 | 6 | 2 | 3 | 5 | 2 |
| 2022–23 | Washington Capitals | NHL | 81 | 12 | 43 | 55 | 56 | — | — | — | — | — |
| 2023–24 | Washington Capitals | NHL | 43 | 6 | 11 | 17 | 24 | — | — | — | — | — |
| 2023–24 | Carolina Hurricanes | NHL | 20 | 2 | 5 | 7 | 6 | 10 | 4 | 2 | 6 | 4 |
| 2024–25 | SKA Saint Petersburg | KHL | 39 | 12 | 25 | 37 | 38 | 6 | 1 | 2 | 3 | 6 |
| 2025–26 | Metallurg Magnitogorsk | KHL | 15 | 1 | 8 | 9 | 6 | — | — | — | — | — |
| 2025–26 | Salavat Yulaev Ufa | KHL | 19 | 6 | 12 | 18 | 12 | 7 | 1 | 1 | 2 | 5 |
| KHL totals | | | 283 | 84 | 126 | 210 | 185 | 54 | 15 | 11 | 26 | 49 |
| NHL totals | | | 723 | 171 | 397 | 568 | 388 | 97 | 33 | 40 | 73 | 52 |

=== International ===
| Year | Team | Event | Result | GP | G | A | Pts | PIM |
|---|---|---|---|---|---|---|---|---|
| 2008 | Russia | U18 | 2nd place, silver medalist(s) | 4 | 2 | 2 | 4 | 18 |
| 2009 | Russia | U17 | 7th | 5 | 6 | 4 | 10 | 6 |
| 2009 | Russia | WJC18 | 2nd place, silver medalist(s) | 7 | 6 | 7 | 13 | 10 |
| 2010 | Russia | WJC | 6th | 6 | 2 | 0 | 2 | 10 |
| 2010 | Russia | WJC18 | 4th | 7 | 5 | 7 | 12 | 6 |
| 2011 | Russia | WJC | 1st place, gold medalist(s) | 7 | 4 | 7 | 11 | 4 |
| 2012 | Russia | WJC | 2nd place, silver medalist(s) | 6 | 6 | 7 | 13 | 2 |
| 2012 | Russia | WC | 1st place, gold medalist(s) | 10 | 2 | 4 | 6 | 4 |
| 2013 | Russia | WC | 6th | 3 | 1 | 0 | 1 | 2 |
| 2014 | Russia | WC | 1st place, gold medalist(s) | 10 | 1 | 1 | 2 | 4 |
| 2016 | Russia | WC | 3rd place, bronze medalist(s) | 6 | 1 | 1 | 2 | 0 |
| 2016 | Russia | WCH | 4th | 4 | 2 | 0 | 2 | 6 |
| 2017 | Russia | WC | 3rd place, bronze medalist(s) | 5 | 1 | 2 | 3 | 6 |
| 2019 | Russia | WC | 3rd | 10 | 2 | 4 | 6 | 6 |
| Junior totals | | | | 43 | 31 | 34 | 65 | 50 |
| Senior totals | | | | 48 | 10 | 12 | 22 | 28 |

== Awards and honors ==
| Award | Year | Ref |
NHL
| NHL All-Star Game | 2016, 2022 | |
| Stanley Cup champion | 2018 | |
International
| WC18 First Team All-Star | 2010 | |
| WJC First Team All-Star | 2011, 2012 | |
| WJC Best Forward | 2012 | |
| WJC Most Valuable Player | 2012 | |
| WJC All-Decade Team | 2019 | |

Awards and achievements
| Preceded by Marcus Johansson | Washington Capitals first-round draft pick 2010 | Succeeded by Filip Forsberg |
