= 2016 National Hockey League All-Star Game =

Professional ice hockey exhibition game

2016 NHL All-Star Game

Bridgestone Arena, Nashville
- January 31, 2016
- Game one: Atlantic 4 – 3 Metropolitan
- Game two: Pacific 9 – 6 Central
- Game three: Pacific 1 – 0 Atlantic
- MVP: John Scott (Pacific)
- Attendance: 17,113

The 2016 National Hockey League All-Star Game was held on January 31, 2016. The game was held in Nashville, at Bridgestone Arena, home of the Nashville Predators. This was Nashville's first time hosting the NHL All-Star Game.

For this edition, the all-star game was replaced with a four-team, three-on-three, single-elimination tournament, with one team representing each of the league's four divisions. The all-stars from the Pacific Division won the four-team tournament. Team captain John Scott, an enforcer voted into the game through a fan vote, scored two goals and was given the game's most valuable player award.

== Format ==
On November 18, 2015, the NHL announced significant changes to the All-Star Game format, replacing the previous two-team format with a 3-on-3 tournament between All-Star teams representing the league's four divisions; the Atlantic division played the Metropolitan, while the Central played the Pacific. Each game was played in two 10-minute halves, and went directly to a shootout in the event of a tie. The winners of the two semi-final games played in a championship game to determine the winner of the competition.

== Rosters ==
National Hockey League staff and associates voted internally to determine the rosters. Fan voting was altered to match the new divisional format. Voting determined the captains of each division, with the condition the player plays in the division they captain. This change was likely due to recent exploitation of the older method. For example, the fan votes in the 2015 All-Star Game were dominated by Chicago Blackhawks players and Buffalo Sabres forward Zemgus Girgensons, who was voted in following a heavy campaign in his native country of Latvia.

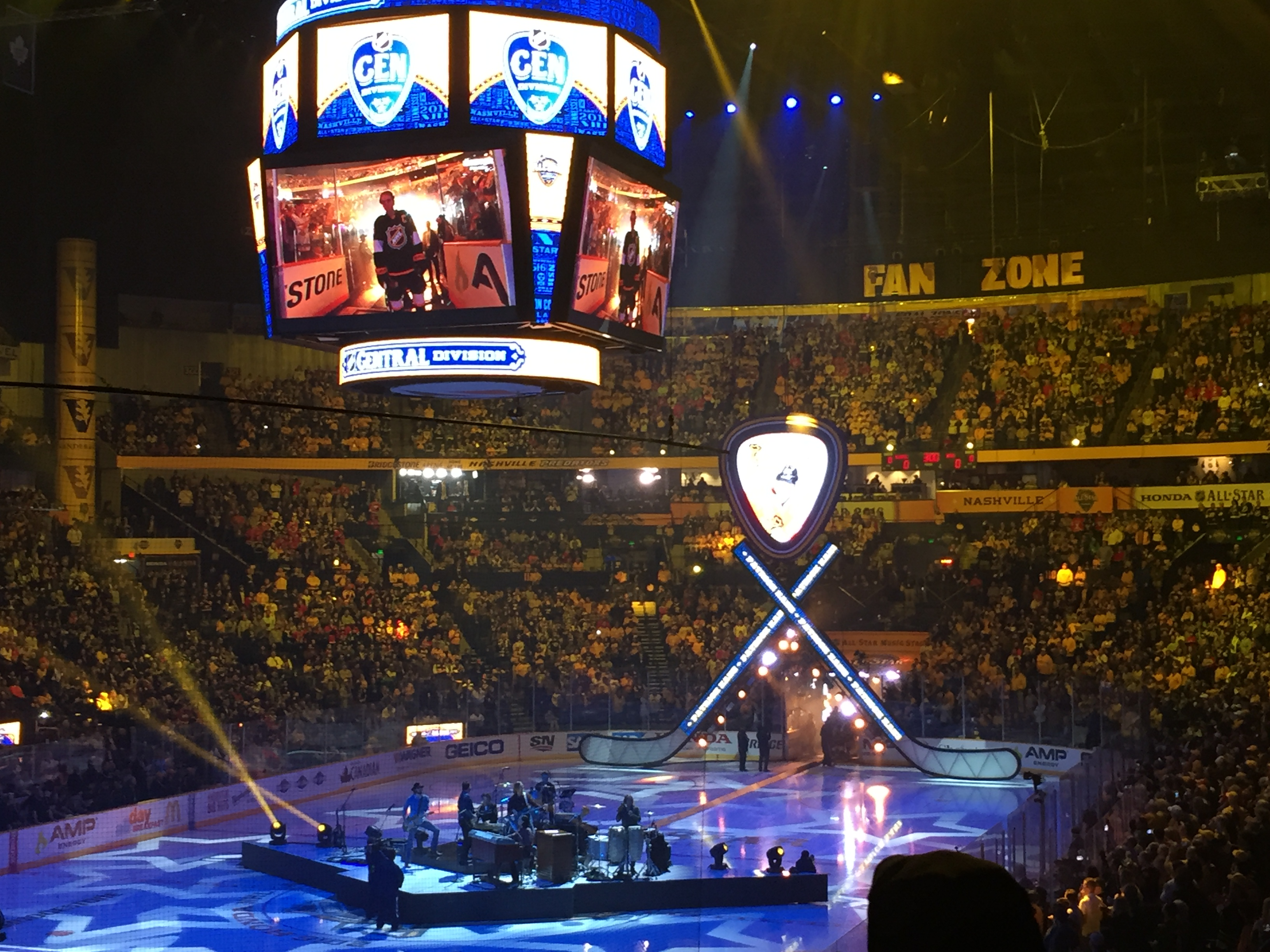
Bridgestone Arena during the game

Florida Panthers forward Jaromir Jagr tried to get fans to not vote for him; at age 43, he stated that he preferred to rest during the All-Star break rather than play in the 3-on-3 format. Girgensons also stated that he did not believe that he deserved an All Star spot this year since he only recorded four points up to that point in the season.

Following weeks of fan voting, the four captains were announced on January 2, 2016. Jagr was selected to lead the Atlantic, along with Alexander Ovechkin of the Washington Capitals (Metropolitan), Patrick Kane of the Chicago Blackhawks (Central) and John Scott of the Arizona Coyotes (Pacific).

Scott received the most votes of any player, despite having only recorded one point in 11 games played with the Coyotes (Scott spent much of the season in the AHL, or as a healthy scratch) and scoring five goals in his entire career up to that point. The situation was compared to Rory Fitzpatrick's All Star campaign in 2007, in which fans vote for a player who would not conventionally be chosen as an All-Star. Despite this, both Scott and the NHL honoured the results. Scott was traded out of the Pacific Division and demoted out of the league on January 15, 2016, in a move that sent Scott to the Montreal Canadiens, who in turn assigned him to the American Hockey League's St. John's IceCaps; the trade was expected to make him ineligible to serve as captain in the All-Star Game, but the NHL announced shortly after the trade that he would be permitted to participate as a free agent for the Pacific Division.

The rest of the rosters were revealed on January 6, 2016, with each of the NHL's 30 teams being represented by at least one player at the time the rosters were set (Arizona, whose lone All-Star was Scott, would ultimately not be represented). The coaches for each division's team were determined by the teams with the highest point percentage in each division following the completion of games on January 9, 2016. The coaches with each distinction included: Gerard Gallant (Florida Panthers) for the Atlantic Division, Lindy Ruff (Dallas Stars) for the Central Division, Darryl Sutter (Los Angeles Kings) for the Pacific Division, and Barry Trotz (Washington Capitals) for the Metropolitan Division. On January 21, 2016, the NHL announced the addition of country music stars Vince Gill, Dierks Bentley, Charles Kelley, and Chris Young as celebrity coaches to each team; Amy Grant replaced Kelley before the game.

Injury replacements were announced on January 28, 2016, with Evgeny Kuznetsov replacing teammate Ovechkin, who was out with a lower-body injury, and James Neal replacing Jonathan Toews, who was out due to illness. To replace Ovechkin's captaincy, John Tavares was awarded the "C".

Atlantic Division
Head coach: (Canada) Gerard Gallant, Florida Panthers Celebrity Coach: (United States) Amy Grant
Nat.	Player	Team	Pos.	#
(Canada)	Roberto Luongo	Florida Panthers	G	1
(United States)	Ben Bishop	Tampa Bay Lightning	G	30
(Canada)	Patrice Bergeron	Boston Bruins	F	37
(Finland)	Leo Komarov	Toronto Maple Leafs	F	47
(Czech Republic)	Jaromir Jagr (C)	Florida Panthers	F	68
(United States)	Dylan Larkin	Detroit Red Wings	F	71
(Canada)	Ryan O'Reilly	Buffalo Sabres	F	90
(Canada)	Steven Stamkos	Tampa Bay Lightning	F	91
(Canada)	Aaron Ekblad	Florida Panthers	D	5
(Sweden)	Erik Karlsson	Ottawa Senators	D	65
(Canada)	P. K. Subban	Montreal Canadiens	D	76

Metropolitan Division
Head coach: (Canada) Barry Trotz, Washington Capitals Celebrity Coach: (United States) Vince Gill
Nat.	Player	Team	Pos.	#
(United States)	Cory Schneider	New Jersey Devils	G	35
(Canada)	Braden Holtby	Washington Capitals	G	70
(Russia)	Evgeny Kuznetsov ^{†}	Washington Capitals	F	92
(Sweden)	Nicklas Backstrom	Washington Capitals	F	19
(Canada)	Claude Giroux	Philadelphia Flyers	F	28
(United States)	Brandon Saad	Columbus Blue Jackets	F	20
(Russia)	Evgeni Malkin	Pittsburgh Penguins	F	71
(Canada)	John Tavares (C)	New York Islanders	F	91
(United States)	Justin Faulk	Carolina Hurricanes	D	27
(United States)	Ryan McDonagh	New York Rangers	D	27
(Canada)	Kris Letang	Pittsburgh Penguins	D	58
(Russia)	Alexander Ovechkin (injured) ^{†}	Washington Capitals	F	8

Central Division
Head coach: (Canada) Lindy Ruff, Dallas Stars Celebrity Coach: (United States) Dierks Bentley
Nat.	Player	Team	Pos.	#
(Finland)	Pekka Rinne	Nashville Predators	G	35
(Canada)	Devan Dubnyk	Minnesota Wild	G	40
(Canada)	Matt Duchene	Colorado Avalanche	F	9
(Canada)	Jamie Benn	Dallas Stars	F	14
(Canada)	James Neal ^{‡}	Nashville Predators	F	18
(United States)	Patrick Kane (C)	Chicago Blackhawks	F	88
(Canada)	Tyler Seguin	Dallas Stars	F	91
(Russia)	Vladimir Tarasenko	St. Louis Blues	F	91
(Canada)	Shea Weber	Nashville Predators	D	6
(United States)	Dustin Byfuglien	Winnipeg Jets	D	33
(Switzerland)	Roman Josi	Nashville Predators	D	59
(Canada)	Jonathan Toews (illness) ^{‡}	Chicago Blackhawks	F	19

Pacific Division
Head coach: (Canada) Darryl Sutter, Los Angeles Kings Celebrity Coach: (United States) Chris Young
Nat.	Player	Team	Pos.	#
(United States)	Jonathan Quick	Los Angeles Kings	G	32
(United States)	John Gibson	Anaheim Ducks	G	36
(Canada)	Taylor Hall	Edmonton Oilers	F	4
(United States)	Joe Pavelski	San Jose Sharks	F	8
(Canada)	Corey Perry	Anaheim Ducks	F	10
(United States)	Johnny Gaudreau	Calgary Flames	F	13
(Sweden)	Daniel Sedin	Vancouver Canucks	F	22
(Canada)	John Scott (C)	No Team (Note: Scott was voted in as a member of the Arizona Coyotes. A trade on January 15 saw Scott moved to the Montreal Canadiens, and sent down to their AHL affiliate St. John's IceCaps. On January 19, the NHL announced it would allow Scott to captain the Pacific Division All-Stars, despite no longer playing in the league or the Pacific Division. However, as a result of the trade, Scott wore a generic NHL jersey, and was not a representative for Arizona; Arizona, as a result of trading away its only All-Star, was the only team not represented in the events.)	F	28
(Canada)	Mark Giordano	Calgary Flames	D	5
(Canada)	Drew Doughty	Los Angeles Kings	D	8
(Canada)	Brent Burns	San Jose Sharks	D	88

^{†} Ovechkin was replaced by Kuznetsov due to a lower-body injury.

^{‡} Toews was replaced by Neal due to illness.

== Bracket ==
Semi-Finals		Final
Atlantic	4
Metropolitan	3	Atlantic	0
Central	6	Pacific	1
Pacific	9

== Game summaries ==
=== East game ===
January 31, 2016	Team Metropolitan	3–4	Team Atlantic	Bridgestone Arena	Recap
01:01 – Kris Letang (1); 04:16 – Evgeny Kuznetsov (1)		First period	Erik Karlsson (1) – 03:47; Jaromir Jagr (1) – 09:22
00:25 – Evgeni Malkin (1); 5:22 – P. K. Subban (1)		Second period	Aaron Ekblad (1) – 2:52
No period		Third period	No period
Braden Holtby 8 saves / 10 shots Cory Schneider 10 saves / 12 shots		Goalie stats	Roberto Luongo 8 saves / 10 shots Ben Bishop 11 saves / 12 shots

=== West game ===
January 31, 2016	Team Pacific	9–6	Team Central	Bridgestone Arena	Recap
00:47 – John Scott (1); 05:26 – pp – Joe Pavelski (1); 08:17 – Johnny Gaudreau (1)		First period	James Neal (1) – 00:26; James Neal (2) – 08:01; Patrick Kane (1) – 09:27
01:49 – Daniel Sedin (1); 03:27 – John Scott (2); 04:04 – Taylor Hall (1); 04:28 – Daniel Sedin (2); 07:44 – Taylor Hall (2); 08:45 – en – Drew Doughty (1)		Second period	Dustin Byfuglien (1) – 04:36; Tyler Seguin (1) – 04:49; Roman Josi (1) – 08:53
No period		Third period	No period
Jonathan Quick 4 saves / 7 shots John Gibson 7 saves / 10 shots		Goalie stats	Pekka Rinne 4 saves / 6 shots Devan Dubnyk 8 saves / 13 shots

=== Final ===
January 31, 2016	Team Atlantic	0–1	Team Pacific	Bridgestone Arena	Recap
No scoring		First period	No scoring
No scoring		Second period	Corey Perry (1) – 03:38
No period		Third period	No period
Roberto Luongo 12 saves / 12 shots Ben Bishop 3 saves / 4 shots		Goalie stats	Jonathan Quick 10 saves / 10 shots John Gibson 7 saves / 7 shots

== Uniforms ==
After the previous game featured black and neon green uniforms with chrome logos, the NHL opted to go with a more traditional design for this game. Once again, the dark uniform was black and the light uniform was white, but the trim colors included dark gray and golden yellow, with the uniform numbers featuring a two-tone beveled design. Both jerseys featured gray upper sleeves and a gray panel on the back containing the nameplate. The three stars of the Flag of Tennessee were featured on the collar of the jersey and the right pants leg.

Because only two jersey designs were used, all four divisional teams were issued jerseys in both colors. In the first game, the Atlantic Division wore black against the Metropolitan Division in white, while in the second game, the Pacific Division wore white against the Central Division in black. For the final game, the Atlantic and Pacific Division teams switched jersey colors, with the Atlantic now wearing white against the black-clad Pacific.

== Festivities ==
Alongside the 3-on-3 tournament the NHL hosted several other events during the All-Star weekend.

- 2016 NHL Fan Fair
- NHL Mascot Showdown
- 2016 Honda NHL All-Star Skills Competition
- Live musical performances by Corrina and Vince Gill (U.S. national anthem), Lennon & Maisy (Canadian national anthem), Lee Brice (pre-game performance), Jennifer Nettles (second intermission), Sixwire (house band) and Small Time Rock Stars (house band)
- Colors Presentation during the singing of the Anthems was by the Music City Composite Squadron Honor Guard, Civil Air Patrol (SER-TN-185). Led by C/Lt Col Zachary Divers (U.S. Flag) and also composed of C/CMSgt Liam Howard (C.A.P. Flag), C/CMSgt Patrick May (Right Guard), C/SSgt Teagan Murphy (Left Guard), as well as Capt Eric Howard (Canadian Flag), and Maj Kevin Divers (Tennessee Flag) with Capt Michael May supervising. This was the first time in Civil Air Patrol's 75 year History to have a unit support a Major Professional Sport's All Star Game as a Color Guard or Honor Guard.

=== NHL All-Star Skills Competition ===
The competition was held on January 30, 2016, and was broken up into six events: Bridgestone NHL Fastest Skater, Honda NHL Breakaway Challenge, DraftKings NHL Accuracy Shooting, Gatorade NHL Skills Challenge Relay, AMP Energy NHL Hardest Shot, and the Discover NHL Shootout. Teams Atlantic and Metropolitan combined to represent the Eastern Conference, and teams Central and Pacific combined to represent the Western Conference.

=== Fastest Skater ===
In this event, four pairs of skaters raced each other simultaneously on parallel short-courses on the rink. The fastest skater in the head-to-head match-ups received the chance to skate a full lap of the outside border of the rink, in the direction of their choosing, in an attempt to break Mike Gartner's record (13.386). The winner of each match-up scored one point, the team with the fastest skater scored a bonus point, and a bonus point was awarded for breaking Mike Gartner's record.

Team East	Time (sec)	Heat	Time (sec)	Team West
**Dylan Larkin**	12.894	1	13.527	Roman Josi
Brandon Saad	13.634	2	14.026	Matt Duchene
Erik Karlsson	14.630	3	13.654	Taylor Hall
Kris Letang	14.081	4	14.203	Dustin Byfuglien
Larkin	13.172*	Record Attempt	13.386	Gartner
Event score: 5–1 Team East

Overall score: 5–1 Team East

=== Breakaway Challenge ===
In this competition, competitors skated with the puck and attempted to score on the opposing team's goalie. Each competitor had two chances. The winner was judged on their presentation, style, creativity, and flair. NHL penalty shot rules did not apply. The winner was determined by fan-vote through Twitter and was rewarded one point for their team. The winner, P. K. Subban, donned a wig, black hockey-pants, an old hockey helmet, and a Jaromir Jagr jersey, skated in, and slid the puck into the net, after initially hitting the post, completing his best Jagr impression with a salute to the crowd. Runner-up Brent Burns was joined by his son Jagger, and Sharks teammate Joe Pavelski and his son Nathan. Former teammates Cory Schneider and Roberto Luongo staged a mock argument in the net to leave it empty while Jagger got the puck from Nathan and scored.

While all other lineups were submitted by the team captains, this event also allowed fan-vote via Twitter to secure a guaranteed spot in the event for an eligible player of their choice. Voting was open from January 26, 2016, to January 28, 2016

Team East Goalie: Cory Schneider	Team West Goalie: Jonathan Quick
Brandon Saad	James Neal
Evgeny Kuznetsov	Matt Duchene
**P. K. Subban**	Brent Burns
**Winner: P. K. Subban (31% of the vote)**
Event score: 1–0 Team East

Overall score: 6–1 Team East

=== Accuracy Shooting ===
In this event, competitors were positioned in front of the net, and were passed the puck from two players situated behind the goal line. The players had to hit targets at the four corners of the net in the fastest time. The event consisted of four head-to-head match-ups, with one shooter from each team per round. The winner of each match-up scored one point and the player who hit all four targets in the fastest time scored a bonus point.

Team East Passers: Nicklas Backstrom, Jaromir Jagr	Time (sec)	Heat	Time (sec)	Team West Passers: Drew Doughty, Vladimir Tarasenko
**John Tavares**	12.294	1	20.000	Patrick Kane
Patrice Bergeron	23.362	2	14.088	Joe Pavelski
Claude Giroux	17.254	3	13.771	Corey Perry
Evgeni Malkin	16.179	4	16.664	Jamie Benn
Event score: 3–2 Team East

Overall score: 9–3 Team East

=== Challenge Relay ===
In this competition, teams of 14 players and 2 goalies were selected from each side to compete in a timed relay event which consisted of four relays with five challenges each: One Timers, Passing, Puck Control, Stick-Handling, and Goalie Goals. Each player on the team had one skill to complete before the next player could start. The goal was to complete the relay in the fastest time. The team with the fastest time in each heat scored one point, and the team with the fastest overall time scored one bonus point.

Team East	Time (min:sec.ms)	Heat	Time (min:sec.ms)	Team West
Aaron Ekblad (One-timer RH); Erik Karlsson (One-timer RH); Steven Stamkos (One-timer RH); Patrice Bergeron (One-timer passer); Nicklas Backstrom (Passing accuracy); Justin Faulk (Puck control); Claude Giroux (Stick handling); Braden Holtby (Goalie goal)	1:38.410	1	2:15.371	Shea Weber (One-timer RH); Drew Doughty (One-timer RH); Corey Perry (One-timer RH); Taylor Hall (One-timer passer); Daniel Sedin (Passing accuracy); Johnny Gaudreau (Puck control); Patrick Kane (Stick handling); Pekka Rinne (Goalie goal)
Ryan McDonagh (One-timer LH); Leo Komarov (One-timer LH); Ryan O'Reilly (One-timer LH); Jaromir Jagr (One-timer passer); Evgeny Kuznetsov (Passing accuracy); Kris Letang (Puck control); Dylan Larkin (Stick handling); Ben Bishop (Goalie goal)	1:44.446	2	**1:27.687**	Mark Giordano (One-timer LH); James Neal (One-timer LH); Vladimir Tarasenko (One-timer LH); Matt Duchene (One-timer passer); Jamie Benn (Passing accuracy); Roman Josi (Puck control); Tyler Seguin (Stick handling); Devan Dubnyk (Goalie goal)
Event score: 2–1 Team West

Overall score: 10–5 Team East

=== Hardest Shot ===
In this competition, players skated in from the blue line, and slapped a puck placed 30 feet from the net as fast as possible into the net. The event consisted of four head-to-head match-ups where each player attempted two shots, with the fastest of their two shots recorded. The winner of each match-up scored one point, and the team with the player who had the fastest speed scored one bonus point.

Team East	Speed (mph)	Heat	Speed (mph)	Team West
Aaron Ekblad	93.4	1	99.6	Dustin Byfuglien
Evgeni Malkin	97.0	2	95.0	Tyler Seguin
Steven Stamkos	103.9	3	95.9	John Scott
P. K. Subban	102.3	4	108.1	**Shea Weber**
Event score: 3–2 Team West

Overall score: 12–8 Team East

=== Shootout ===
18 skaters and three goaltenders from each team will participate in the three-round shootout, with each round using six skaters and one goalie from each team. Teams received two minutes per round, to score as many goals as possible. NHL shootout rules applied to each scoring attempt. One point was awarded for each goal scored, except for players one and three from each team who were designated "Discover puck players", and goals scored by these players counted as two.

Team East Goalies: Roberto Luongo, Round 1 Braden Holtby, Round 2 Cory Schneider, Round 3	Result	Result	Team West Goalies: Devan Dubnyk, Round 1 John Gibson, Round 2 Pekka Rinne, Round 3
Round 1
Evgeni Malkin	Goal (x2)	Save	Patrick Kane
Jaromir Jagr	Save	Save	Matt Duchene
P. K. Subban	Save	Save	Brent Burns
Ryan O'Reilly	Save	Save	Mark Giordano
Leo Komarov	Save	Save	Vladimir Tarasenko
Aaron Ekblad	Goal	Save	Daniel Sedin
Malkin	Goal (x2)	Save	Kane
Jagr	Save	Save	Duchene
Subban	Save	Save	Burns
Round 2
Patrice Bergeron	Goal (x2)	Goal (x2)	Joe Pavelski
Nicklas Backstrom	Goal	Save	Taylor Hall
Steven Stamkos	Goal (x2)	Save	Jamie Benn
Evgeny Kuznetsov	Save	Save	James Neal
Ryan McDonagh	Goal	Save	Johnny Gaudreau
Justin Faulk	Goal	Save	Dustin Byfuglien
Bergeron	Goal (x2)	Goal (x2)	Pavelski
Backstrom	Save	Save	Hall
		Save	Benn
Round 3
Claude Giroux	Goal (x2)	Save	John Scott
Dylan Larkin	Goal	Save	Shea Weber
John Tavares	Save	Goal (x2)	Tyler Seguin
Kris Letang	Save	Save	Corey Perry
Erik Karlsson	Save	Save	Drew Doughty
Brandon Saad	Save	Save	Roman Josi
Giroux	Save	Save	Scott
Larkin	Goal	Save	Weber
Tavares	Save	Save	Seguin
		Save	Perry
Event score: 17–4 Team East

Overall score: 29–12 Team East

- italics = Heat winner
- **bold** = Event winner
- * denotes record

== See also ==
- NHL All-Star Game
- 2015–16 NHL season
