= List of people from Yekaterinburg =

Coat of Arms of Yekaterinburg

This is a list of notable people who were born or have lived in Yekaterinburg (1924–1991: Sverdlovsk), Russia.

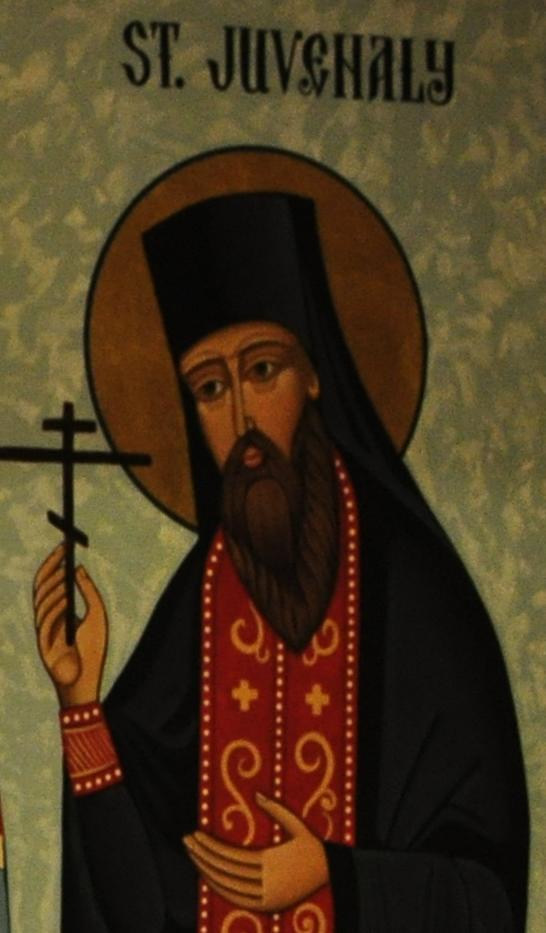
Juvenaly of Alaska (1761–1796)

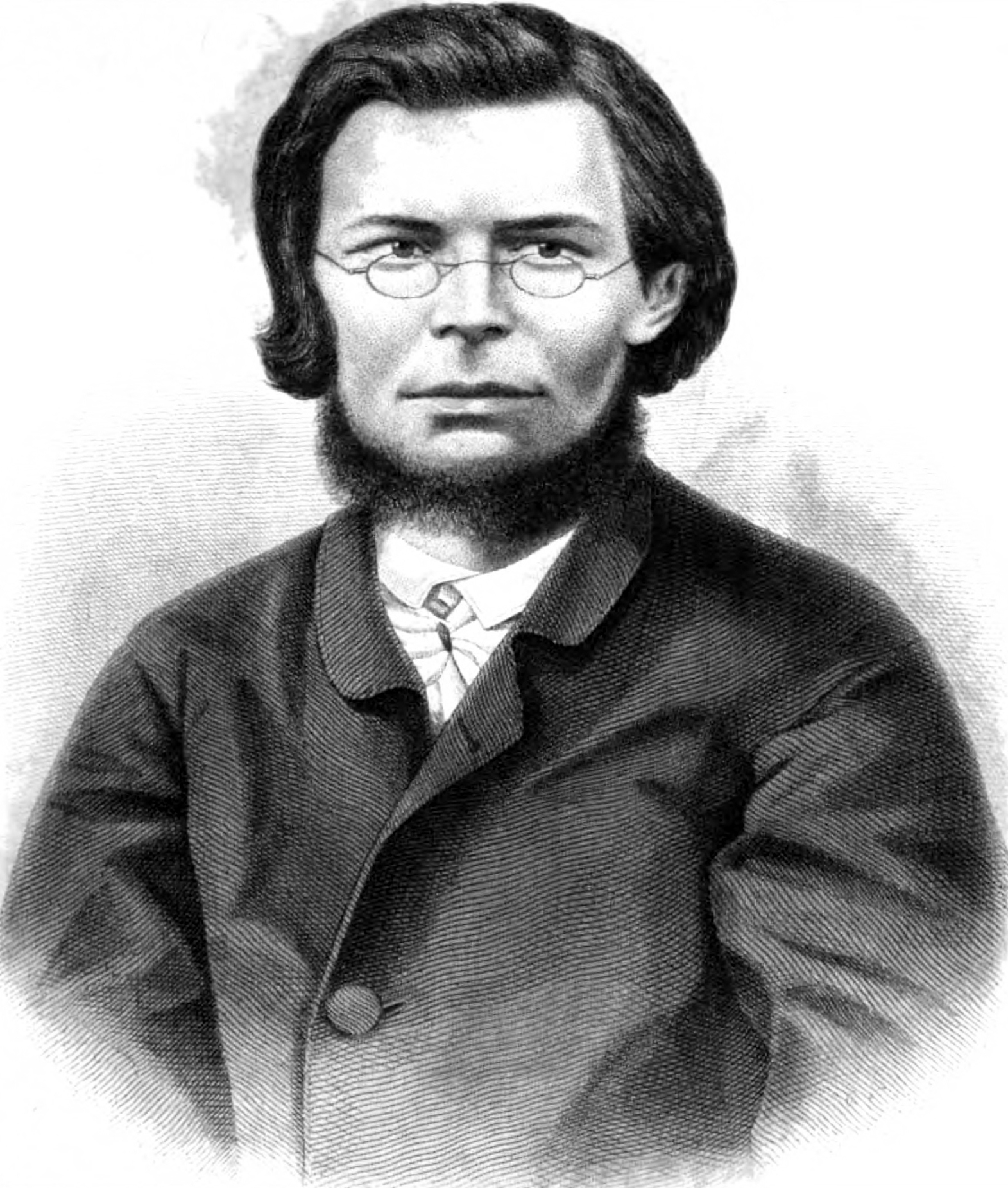
Fyodor Reshetnikov (1841–1871)

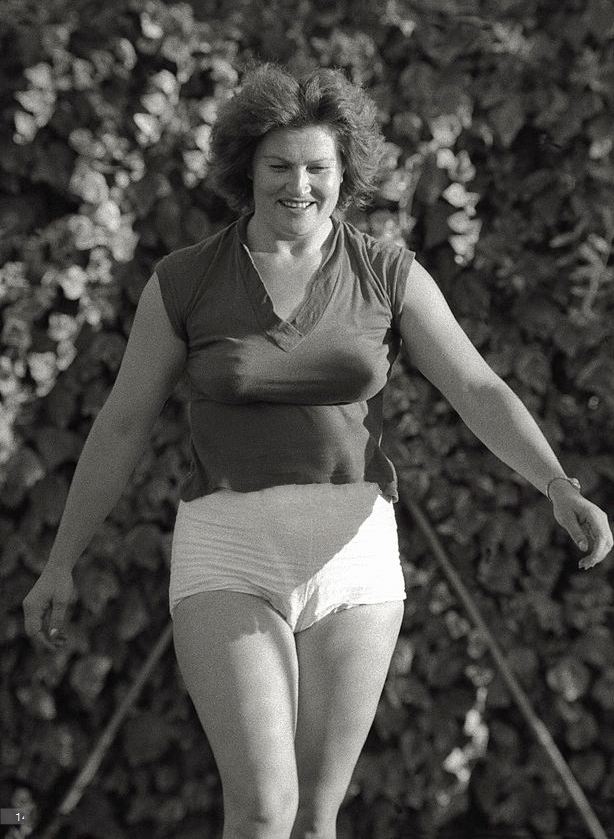
Nina Ponomaryova (1929–2016)

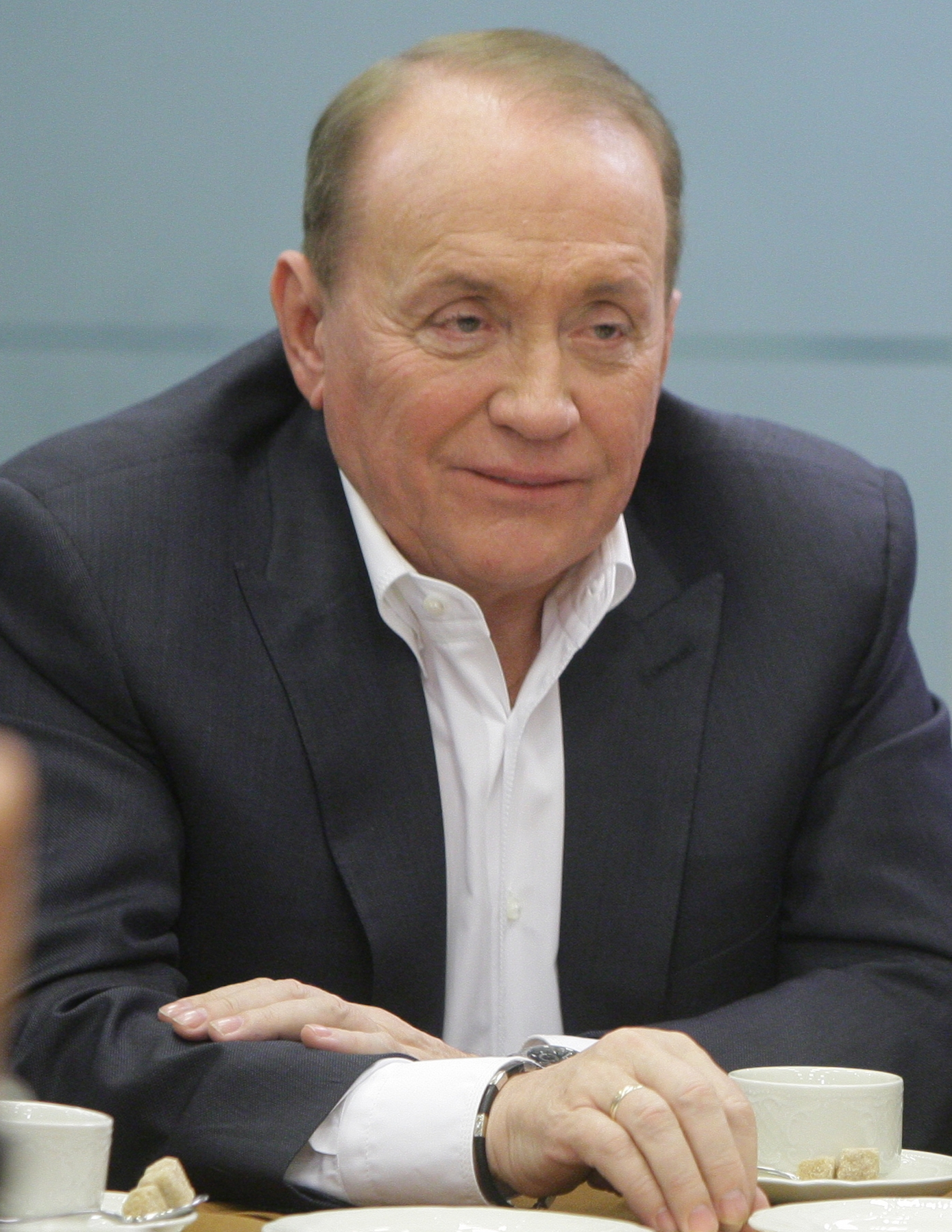
Alexander Maslyakov (1941–2024)

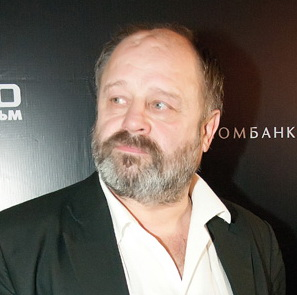
Vladimir Ilyin (born 1947)

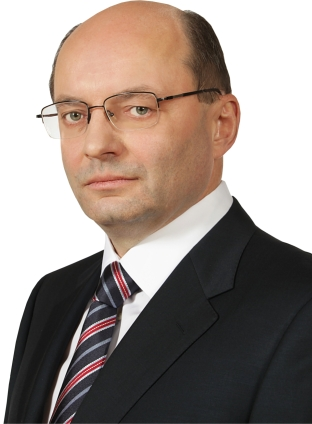
Alexander Misharin (born 1959)

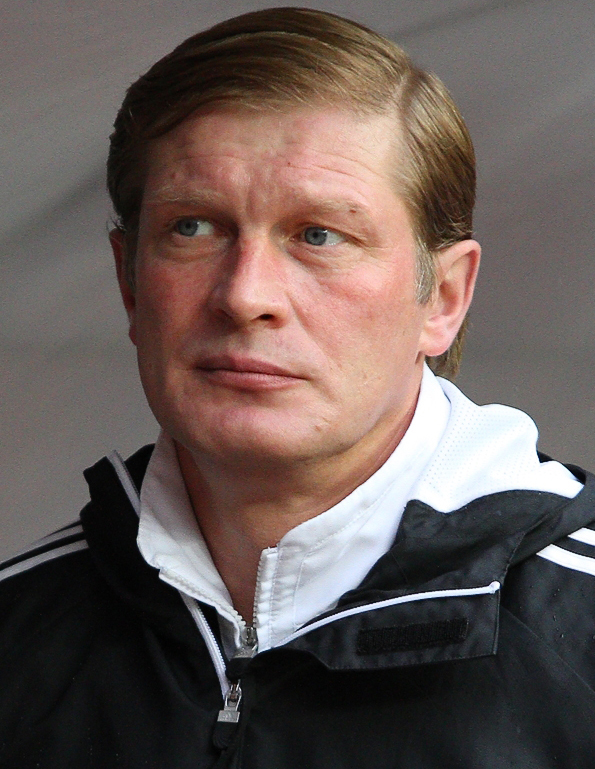
Aleksandr Podshivalov (born 1964)

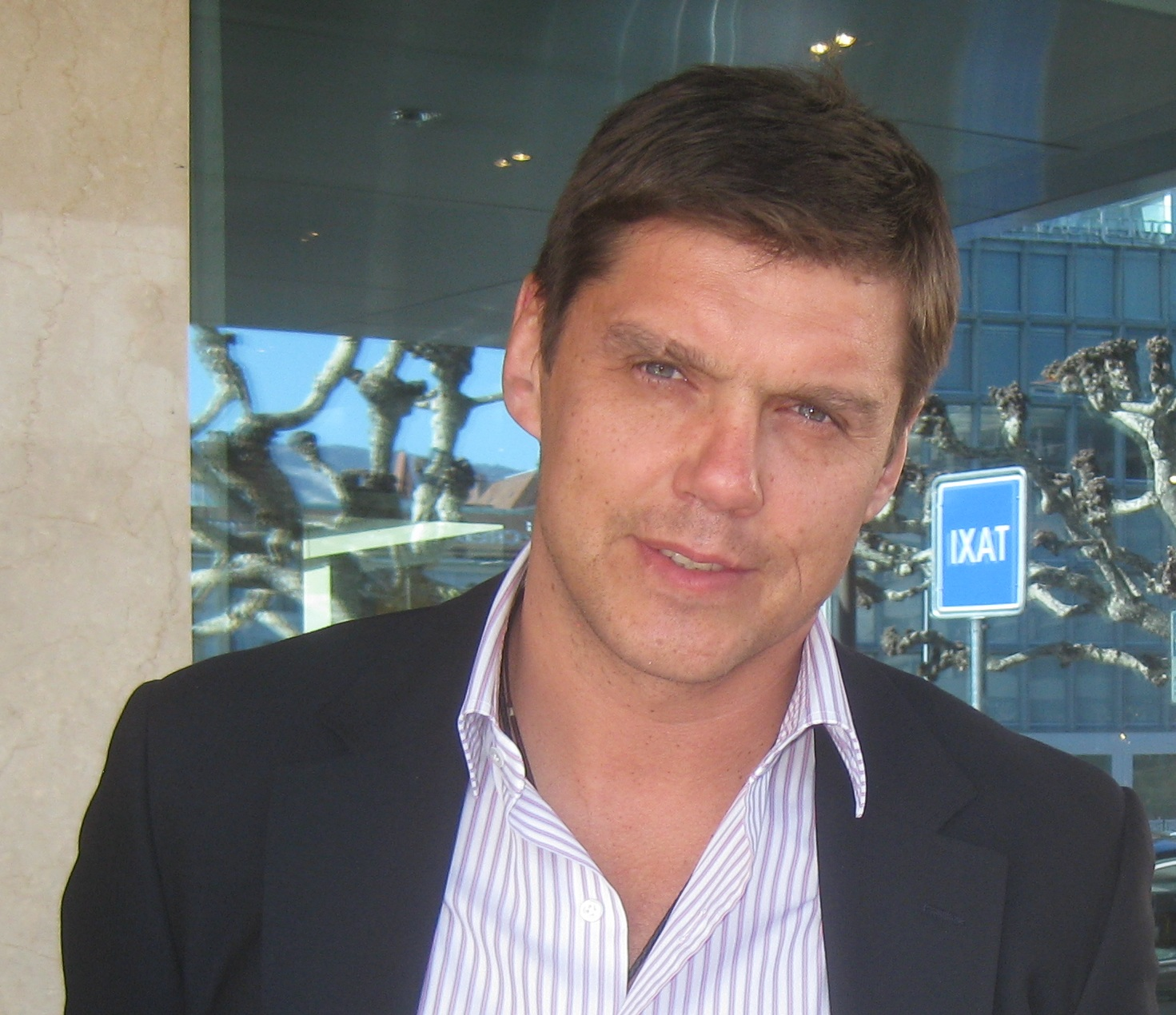
Vladimir Malakhov (born 1968)

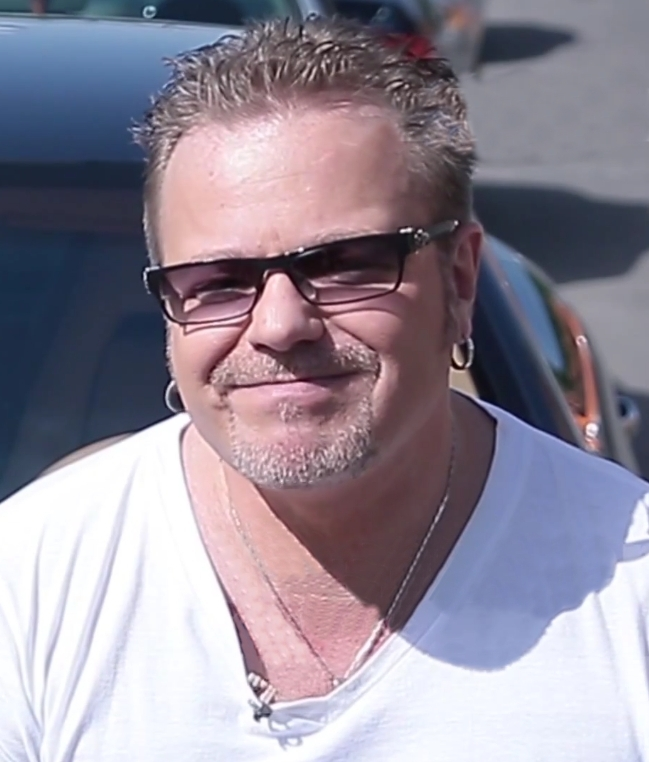
Vladimir Presnyakov Jr. (born 1968)

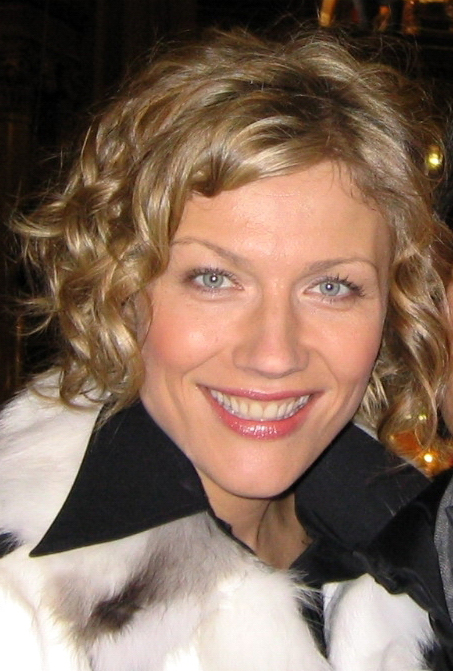
Natasha Stefanenko (born 1969)

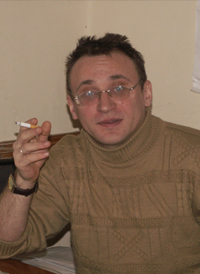
Oleg Bogayev (born 1970)

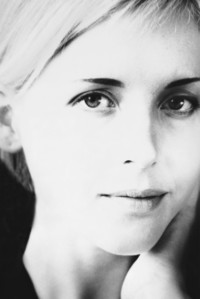
Lena Herzog (born 1970)

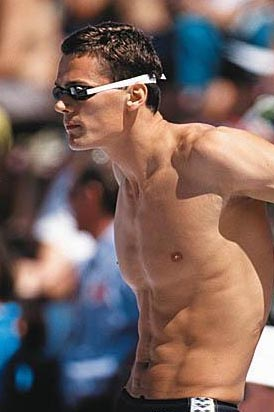
Alexander Popov (born 1971)

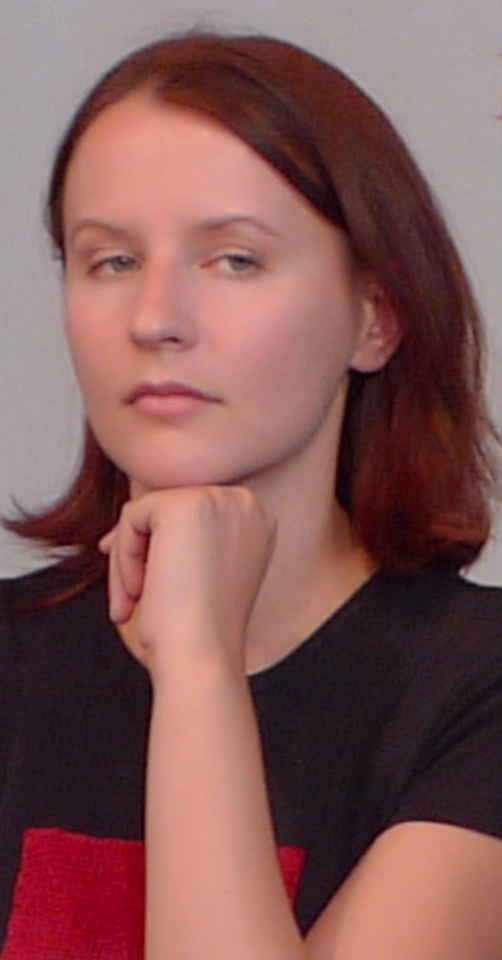
Alina Bronsky (born 1978)

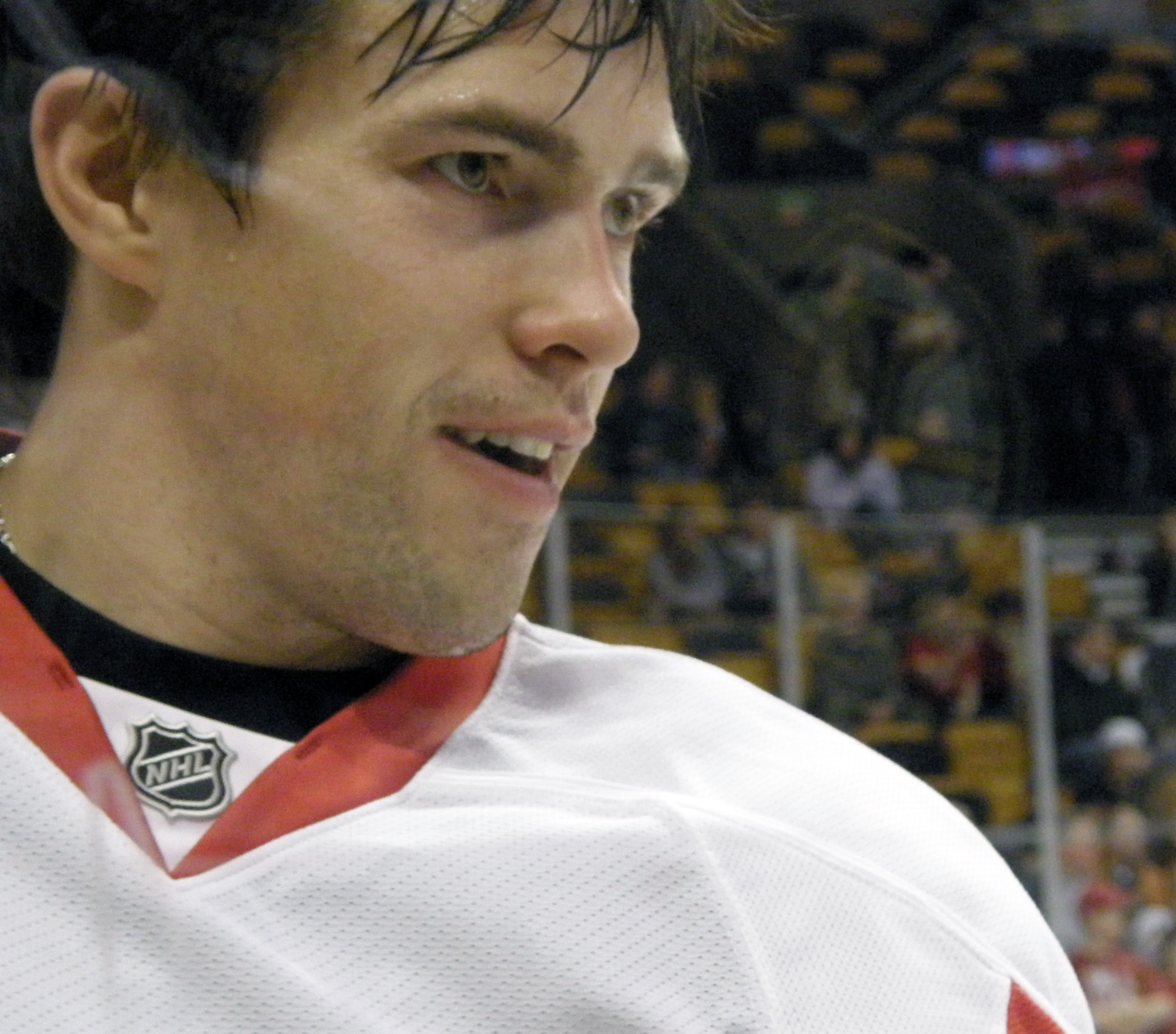
Pavel Datsyuk (born 1978)

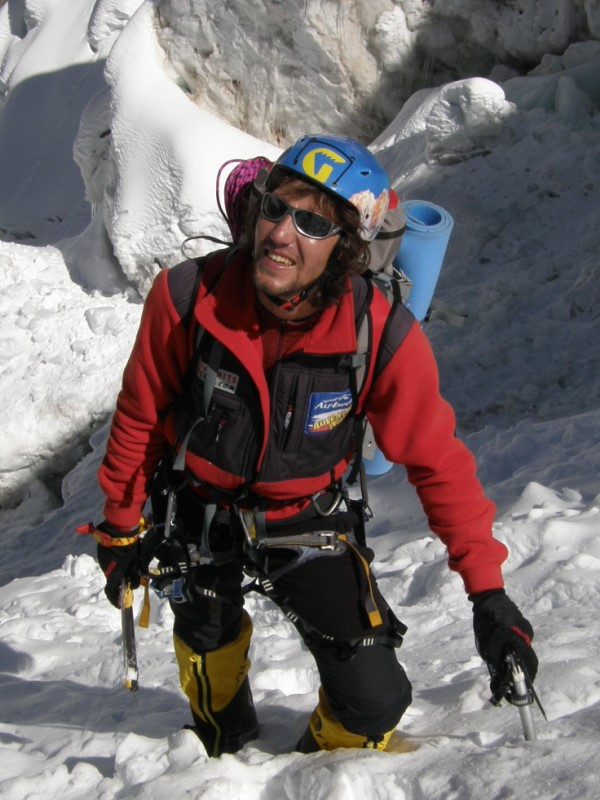
Sergey Kofanov (born 1978)

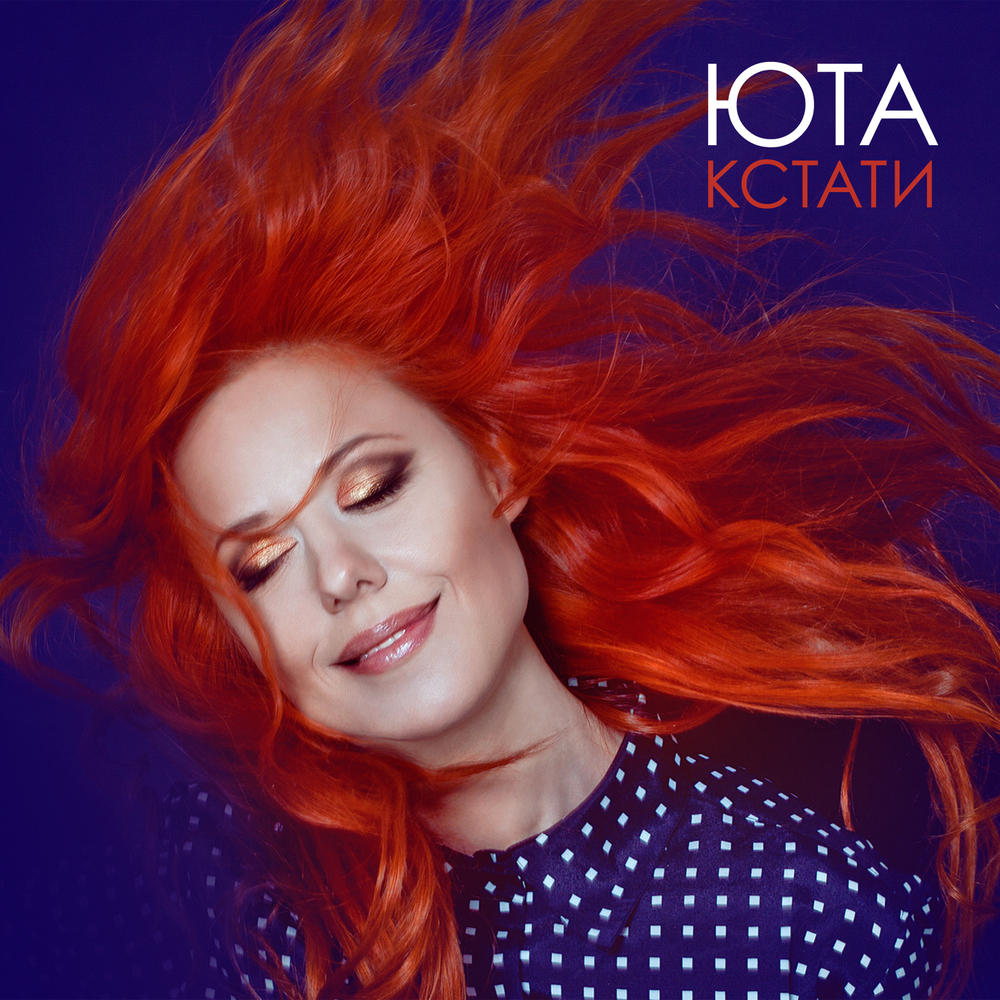
Yuta (singer)

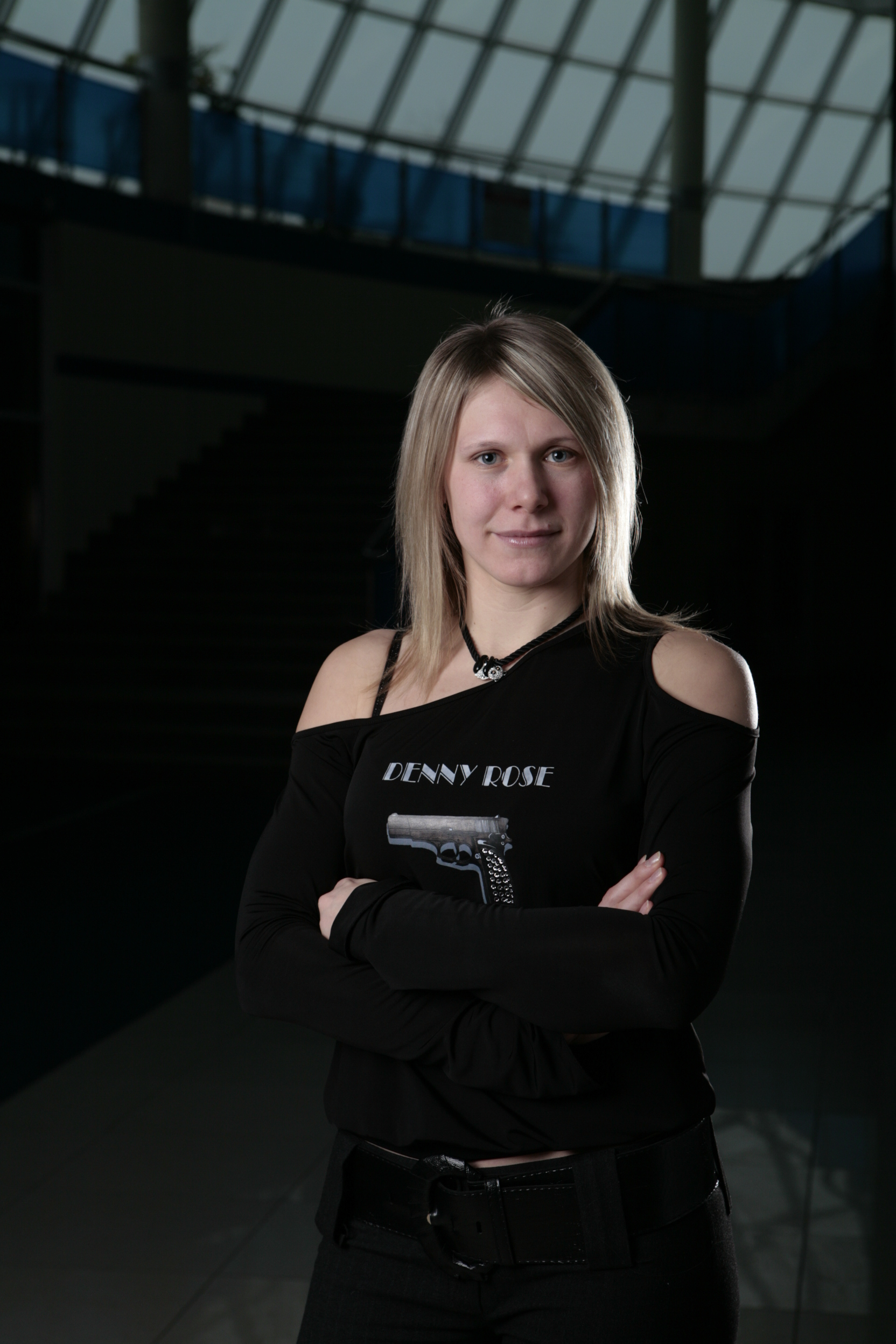
Yekaterina Smolentseva (born 1981)

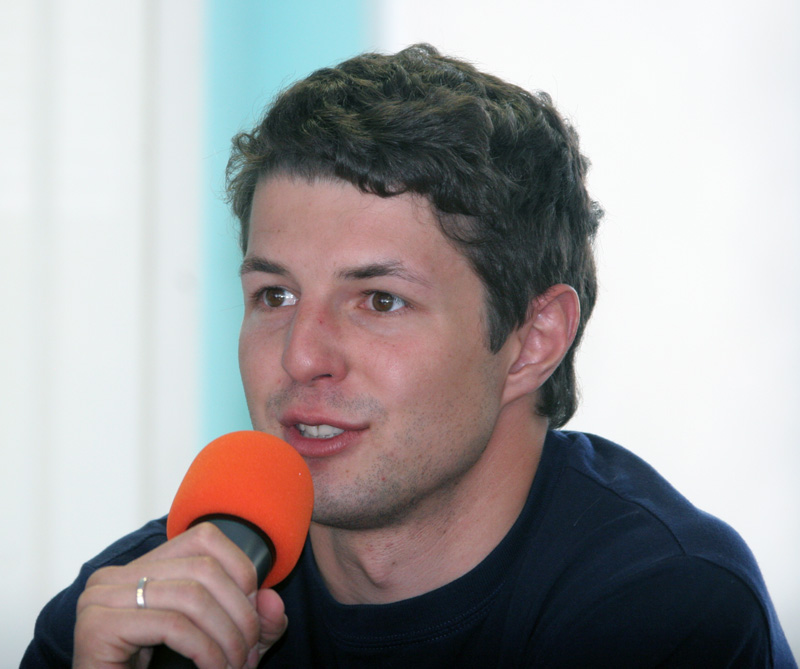
Nikolay Pankratov (born 1982)

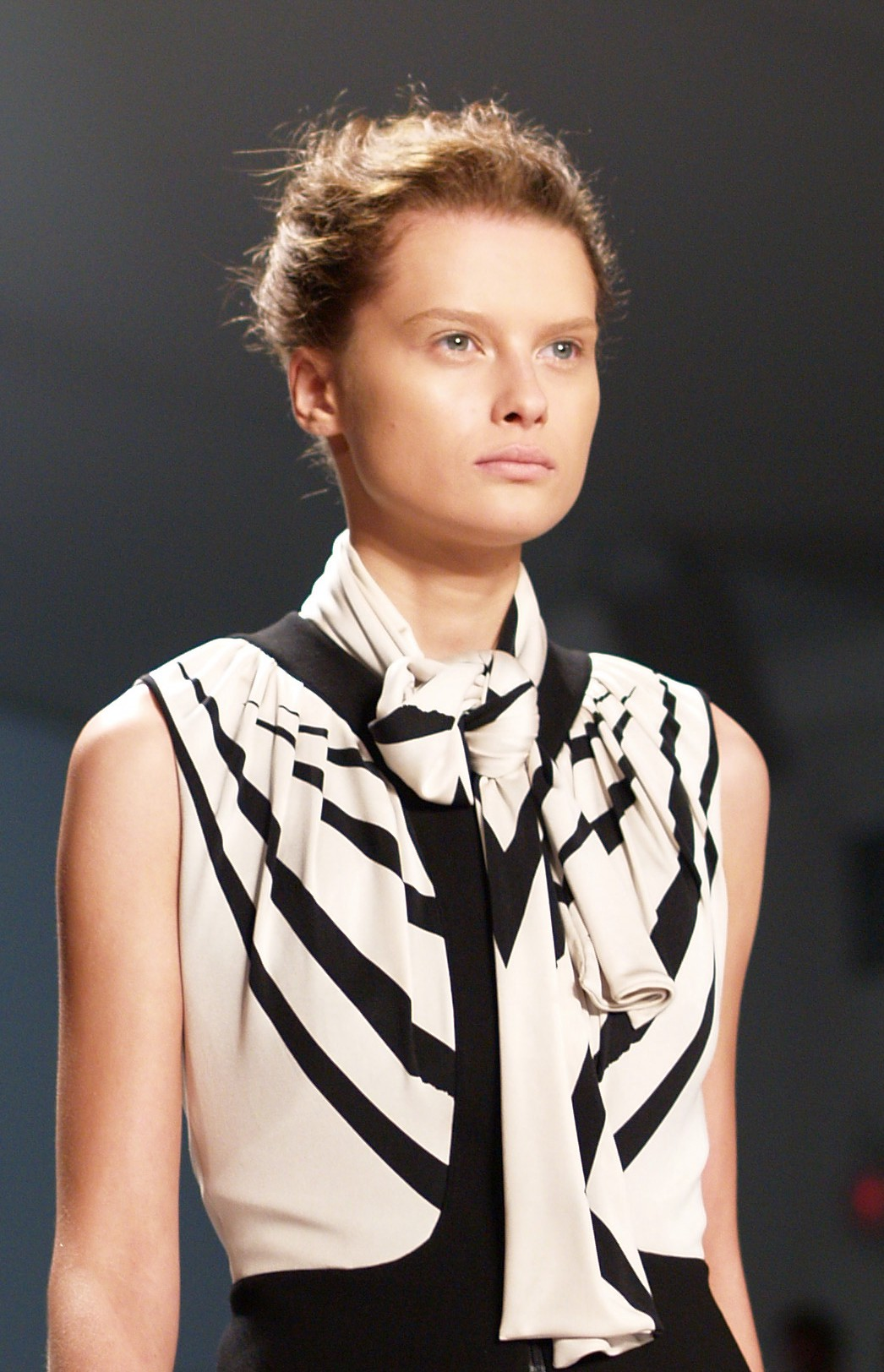
Elena Melnik (born 1986)

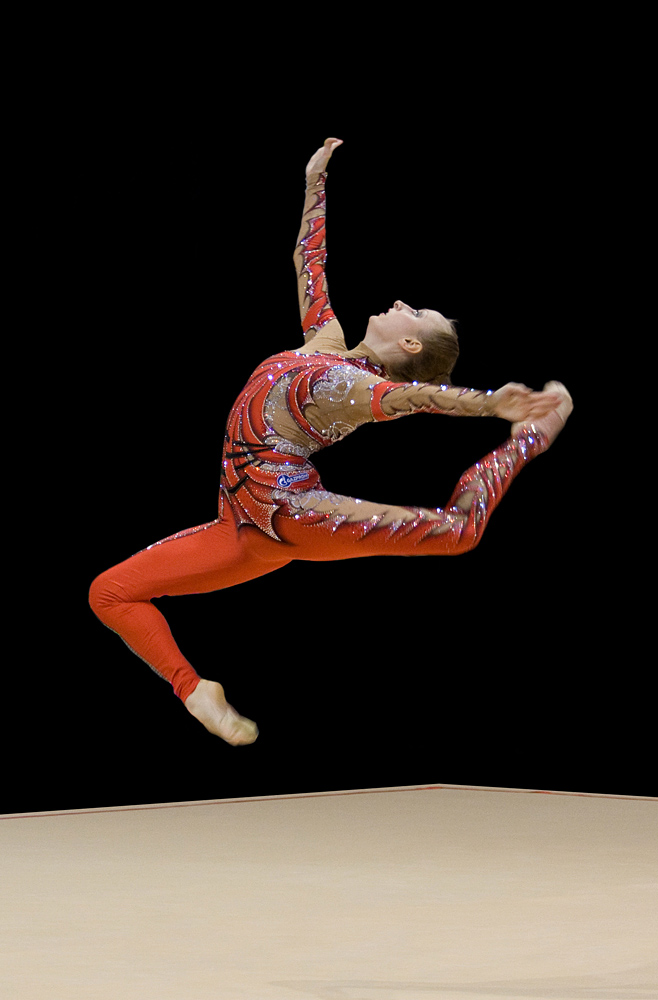
Vera Sessina (born 1986)

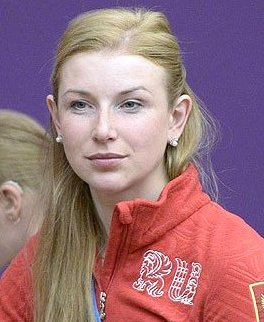
Alena Kaufman (born 1987)

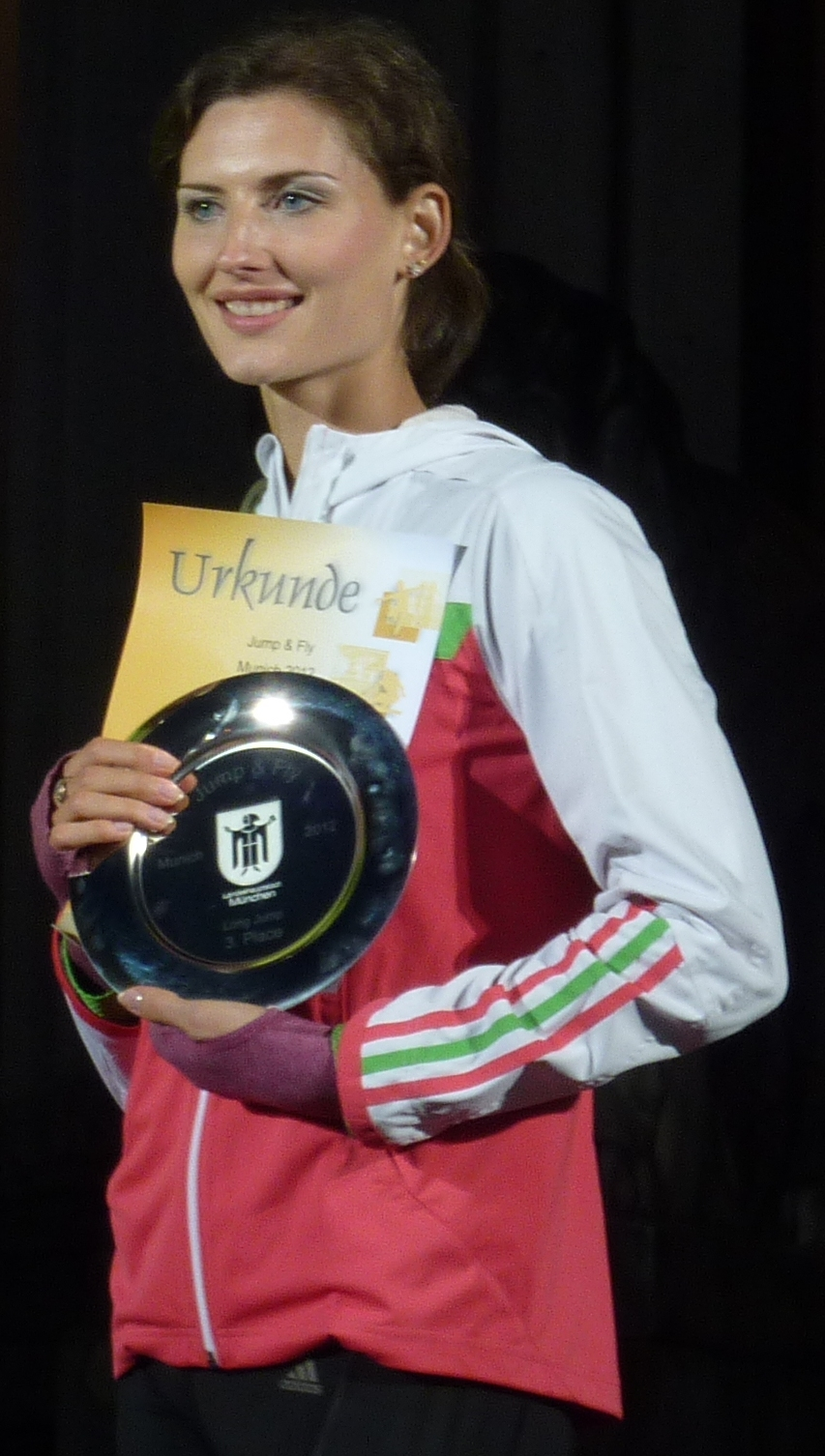
Yuliya Pidluzhnaya (born 1988)

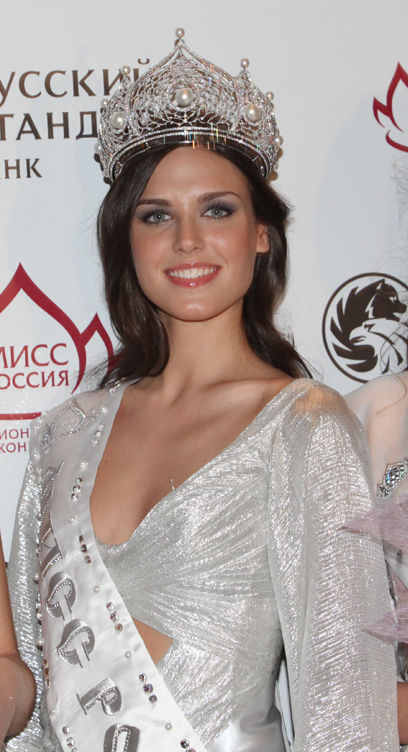
Irina Antonenko (born 1991)

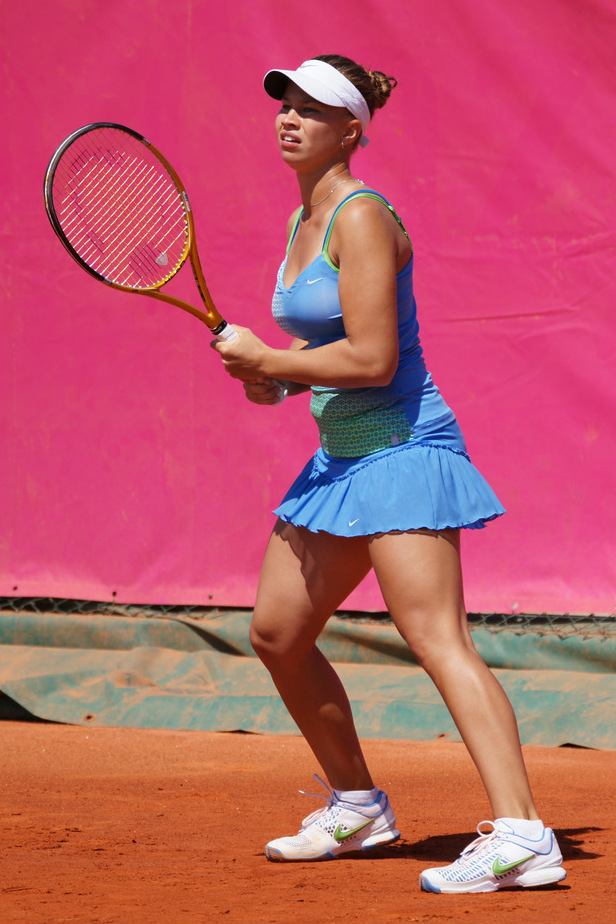
Valeria Savinykh (born 1991)

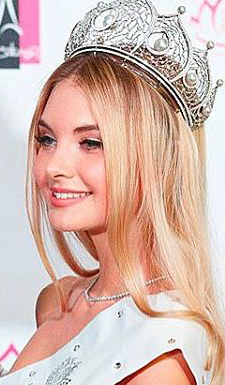
Polina Popova (born 1995)

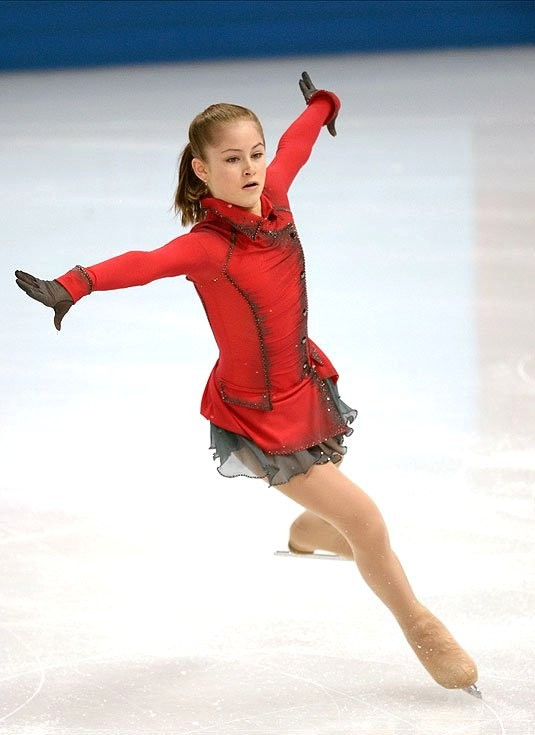
Yulia Lipnitskaya (born 1998)

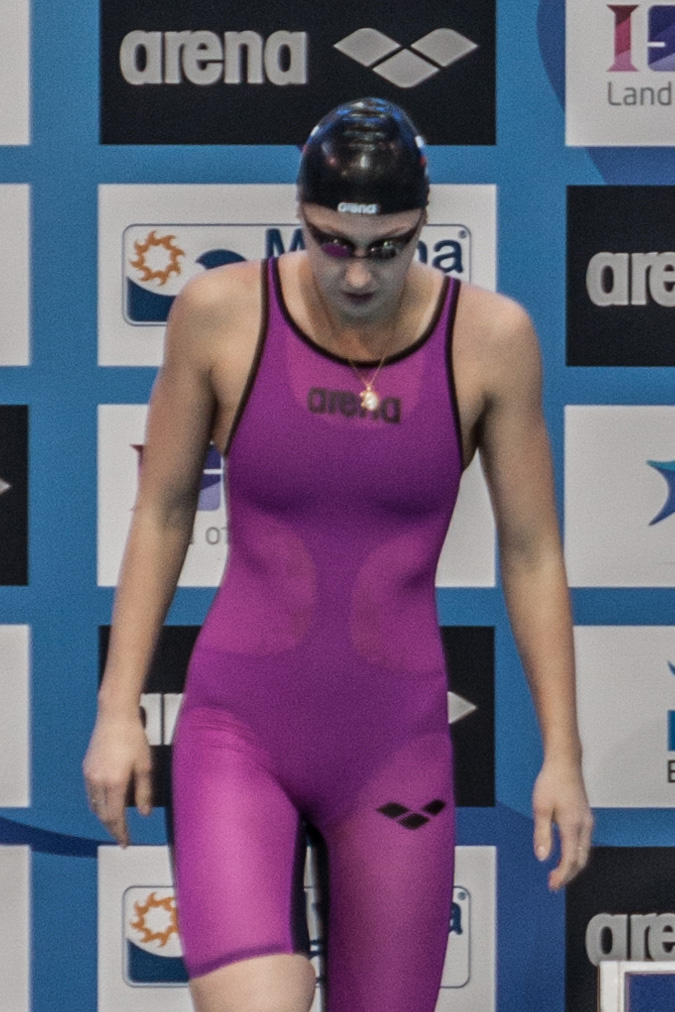
Daria Ustinova (born 1998)

== Born in Yekaterinburg ==
=== 18th and 19th century ===
==== 1701–1900 ====
- Ivan Polzunov (1728–1766), Russian inventor. He created the first steam engine in Russia and the first two-cylinder engine in the world.
- Juvenaly of Alaska (1761–1796), Protomartyr of America, was a hieromartyr and member of the first group of Orthodox missionaries who came from the monastery of Valaam to evangelize the native inhabitants of Alaska
- Fyodor Reshetnikov (1841–1871), Russian author
- Leonard Turzhansky (1875–1945), Russian impressionist painter
- Peter Ermakov (1884–1952), Russian Bolshevik, notable as having been among those responsible for the execution of the deposed Tsar Nicholas II, his wife, their children, and their retinue
- Pyotr Tayozhny (1887–1952), Russian sculptor
- Julian Shchutsky (1897–1938), Russian sinologist

=== 20th century ===
==== 1901–1930 ====
- Grigori Aleksandrov (1903–1983), Soviet film director
- Tatyana Grosman (1904–1982), Russian American printmaker and publisher
- Aleksei Zachvatkin (1905–1950), Russian entomologist and acarologist
- Igor Oberberg (1907–1996), Russian-born German cinematographer
- Tatyana Tolmachova (1907–1998), Soviet figure skater, figure skating coach and one of the founders of Soviet figure skating school
- Lev Weinstein (1916–2004), Soviet world champion and Olympic bronze medalist in shooting
- Boris Kondrashin (1923–1994), Russian and Soviet painter of socialist realism
- Vladimir Gulyaev (1924–1997), Soviet actor of theater and cinema
- Nikolay Krasovsky (1924–2012), Russian mathematician
- Lyudmila Lyadova (1925–2021), Russian composer
- Ernst Neizvestny (1925–2016), Russian-American sculptor, painter, graphic artist and art philosopher
- Rimma Zhukova (1925–1999), Soviet speed skater
- Aleksandr Matveyev (1926–2010), Russian linguist
- Aleksandr Zasukhin (1928–2012), Soviet boxer
- Galina Brezhneva (1929–1998), daughter of Soviet politician and longtime General Secretary Leonid Brezhnev
- Nina Ponomaryova (1929–2016), Russian discus thrower and the first Soviet Olympic champion
- Yuri Semenov (1929–2023), Soviet and Russian historian, philosopher, anthropologist

==== 1931–1940 ====
- Alexander Avdonin (born 1932), Russian mineralogist, archeologist
- Vitaliy Konovalov (1932–2013), Soviet politician
- Roman Tkachuk (1932–1994), Soviet theatre and film actor
- Erik Bulatov (born 1933), Russian artist
- Vladimir Krasnopolsky (1933–2022), Russian film director, producer, and screenwriter
- Valeri Urin (1934–2023), Soviet football player
- Eduard Lazarev (1935–2008), Moldovan composer of Russian descent
- Georgy Koshlakov (1936–2017), Deputy Prime Minister of Tajikistan
- Edouard Pliner (1936–2016), Soviet and Russian figure skating coach
- Aleksandr Demyanenko (1937–1999), Russian film and theater actor
- Albert Filozov (1937–2016), Soviet and Russian actor
- Aleksei Zasukhin (1937–1996), Soviet boxer
- Old Man Bukashkin (1938–2005), Russian artist and poet
- Oleg Dementiev (1938–1991), Russian chess master who won the Russian Chess Championship in 1971
- Viktor Dolnik (1938–2013), Russian ornithologist
- Alexander Dolsky (born 1938), Soviet and Russian poet, writer, artist and most famously known for being a bard
- Valery Kichin (born 1938), Russian journalist, film and theater critic, radio host
- Igor Bakalov (1939–1992), Soviet sports shooter
- Igor Ksenofontov (1939–1999), Soviet and Russian figure skating coach, founder of the Yekaterinburg figure skating school, president of the Sverdlovsk Figure Skating Federation
- Dmitri Z. Garbuzov (1940–2006), Russian-American physicist; one of the pioneers and inventors of room temperature continuous-wave-operating diode lasers and high-power diode lasers
- Alexei Khvostenko (1940–2004), Russian avant-garde poet, singer-songwriter, artist and sculptor

==== 1941–1950 ====
- Viktor Anichkin (1941–1975), Russian footballer
- Vladimir Mulyavin (1941–2003), Soviet and Belarusian rock musician and the founder of the folk-rock band Pesniary
- Alexander Maslyakov (1941–2024), prominent Soviet and Russian television game show host
- Vladimir Grammatikov (born 1942), Russian and Soviet actor theater and film, director, screenwriter and producer
- Masha Ivashintsova (1942−2000), Russian photographer
- Samuil Lurie (1942–2015), Russian writer and literary historian
- Lyudmila Bragina (born 1943), Russian middle distance runner
- Semyon Altov (born 1945), Jewish Russian and Soviet comedy writer
- Vitaly Naumkin (born 1945), Russian Professor, Corresponding Member of the Russian Academy of Sciences
- Vladimir Gostyukhin (born 1946), Soviet, Russian and Belarusian film and stage actor
- Nukhim Rashkovsky (1946–2023), Russian chess Grandmaster and coach
- Sergey Cheskidov (born 1947), Soviet and Russian sports commentator, broadcaster
- Vladimir Ilyin (born 1947), Soviet and Russian actor
- Vladimir Makeranets (1947–2024), Soviet and Russian director of photography, producer and film director
- Boris Belkin (born 1948), Russian violin virtuoso
- Ekaterina Lakhova (born 1948), Russian politician and statesman
- Georgy Shishkin (born 1948), Russian painter
- Alfia Nazmutdinova (born 1949), Soviet rhythmic gymnast
- Oleg Platonov (born 1950), Russian writer, historian and economist

==== 1951–1960 ====
- Galina Belyayeva (born 1951), Russian-born Kazakh sport shooter
- Sergey Nefedov (born 1951), Russian historian
- Stanislav Yeryomin (born 1951), Soviet basketball player
- Nadezhda Kozhushanaya (1952–1997), Soviet and Russian screenwriter and writer
- Ludmila Saunina (born 1952), Russian chess player and a woman grandmaster
- Alexander Dudoladov (1953–1999), Soviet and Russian writer, screenwriter and film director
- Olga Barysheva (born 1954), Russian former basketball player
- Yuri Loza (born 1954), Russian singer, poet, and composer
- Boris Golovin (born 1955), Russian singer-songwriter, musician, poet and novelist
- Mikhail Kuzmin (born 1955), Russian political figure and a deputy of the 8th State Duma
- Viktor Shishkin (born 1955), Soviet football player and Russian football coach
- Aleksandr Sergeyevich Vishnevsky (1955–2015), Russian speleologist
- Tatiana Ferdman (born 1957), Soviet female table tennis player
- Valentina Lalenkova (born 1957), Soviet speed skater
- Olga Slavnikova (born 1957), Russian novelist and literary critic
- Stanislav Leonovich (born 1958), Soviet pair skater
- Mariya Litovskaya (born 1958), Soviet and Russian philologist, literary critic, Professor of the Ural Federal University
- Alexander Malinin (born 1958), Russian singer
- Anatoly Medennikov (born 1958), Soviet speed skater
- Nikolai Narimanov (born 1958), Soviet ice hockey player
- Nikolai Zouev (1958–2022), Russian mixed martial artist
- Aleksei Balabanov (1959–2013), Russian film director, screenwriter and producer
- Malik Gaisin (born 1959), Russian entrepreneur and politician
- Natalia Karamysheva (born 1959), Soviet ice dancer
- Oleg Khafizov (born 1959), Russian writer
- Ilya Kormiltsev (1959–2007), Russian poet, translator and publisher
- Alexander Misharin (born 1959), Russian politician and former governor of Sverdlovsk Oblast
- Andrey Prokofyev (1959–1989), Soviet athlete, winner of a gold medal in the 4 × 100 m relay at the 1980 Summer Olympics
- Andrey Rudensky (born 1959), Soviet and Russian film and stage actor
- Alexander Korotich (born 1960), Russian artist, designer, writer and teacher
- Yelena Volkova (born 1960), Soviet competitive volleyball player and Olympic gold medalist (1988)
- Tatyana Yumasheva (born 1960), younger daughter of former Russian president Boris Yeltsin

==== 1961–1965 ====
- Marat Akbarov (born 1961), Soviet competitive pair skater
- Svitlana Mankova (born 1962), Soviet and Ukrainian handball player
- Yuri Naumov (born 1962), Russian poet, composer, singer and acoustic guitar player
- Yevgeny Roizman (born 1962), Russian politician, the mayor of Yekaterinburg, 2013-2018
- Ilya Byakin (born 1963), Soviet ice hockey player
- Yulia Bystrova (born 1963), Soviet and Russian pair skater
- Andrei Martemyanov (born 1963), Soviet and Russian ice hockey player and coach
- Larisa Rudakova (born 1963), Russian soprano singer
- Marat Galimov (born 1964), Russian professional football referee and a former player
- Mark Lipovetsky (born 1964), Russian literary, film, and cultural critic
- Marina Pestova (born 1964), Soviet competitive pair skater
- Aleksandr Podshivalov (born 1964), Russian association football coach and a former player
- Nikolai Stain (born 1964), Russian professional football coach and a former player
- Anton Bakov (born 1965), Russian politician and monarchist
- Svetlana Paramygina (born 1965), Soviet and Belarusian biathlete

==== 1966–1970 ====
- Alyona Azernaya (born 1966), Russian naïve painter
- Elena Berezovich (born 1966), Russian linguist
- Irina Khabarova (born 1966), Russian sprinter
- Marina Klimova (born 1966), Soviet ice dancer
- Veronica Pershina (born 1966), Soviet competitive pair skater
- Anna Biryukova (born 1967), Russian female triple jumper
- Galina Belyayeva (born 1967), Russian sport shooter
- Alexei Gorshkov (born 1967), Russian ice dancing coach
- Ilya Itin (born 1967), Russian concert pianist
- Maxim Ivanov (born 1967), Russian political figure and a deputy of the 7th and 8th State Dumas
- Vladimir Miklushevsky (born 1967), Russian politician
- Mikhail Murashko (born 1967), Russian physician and politician
- Mikhail Shchennikov (born 1967), Russian race walker
- Yuliya Vlasova (born 1967), Russian short track speed skater
- Aleksei Yushkov (1967–1996), Russian professional footballer
- Roman Zvonkov (1967–1995), Ukrainian biathlete
- Tatyana Chebykina (born 1968), Russian athlete
- Irina Ilchenko (born 1968), Russian volleyball player
- Dmitry Kamenshchik (born 1968), Russian businessman
- Lyudmila Konovalova (born 1968), Russian basketball player
- Svetlana Korytova (born 1968), Russian volleyball player
- Vladimir Malakhov (born 1968), Russian professional ice hockey player
- Svetlana Petcherskaia (born 1968), Soviet biathlete
- Vladimir Presnyakov Jr. (born 1968), Soviet and Russian singer, musician, keyboardist, composer, arranger and actor
- Eduard Yugrin (born 1968), Russian professional footballer
- Julia Demina (born 1969), Russian chess player
- Lev Fridman (born 1969), Russian auto racing driver
- Pavlo Khnykin (born 1969), Soviet and Ukrainian freestyle swimmer
- Viktor Maigourov (born 1969), Russian biathlete
- Oleg Presnyakov (born 1969), Russian writer, playwright, screenwriter, director
- Natasha Stefanenko (born 1969), Russian actress, model and television presenter
- Andrey Anufriyenko (1970–2019), Russian speed skater
- Alexey Bakunin (born 1970), Russian professional footballer
- Oleg Bogayev (born 1970), Russian playwright
- Aleksandr Demidov (born 1970), Russian actor, screenwriter, camera operator and film producer
- Dmitry Geller (born 1970), Russian animator and film director
- Lena Herzog (born 1970), Russian American documentary and fine art photographer
- Oxana Slesarenko (born 1970), Russian wheelchair curler

==== 1971–1975 ====
- Lioudmila Kortchaguina (born 1971), Canadian marathon runner of Russian descent
- Alexander Popov (born 1971), Russian Olympic gold-winning swimmer
- Yelena Tyurina (born 1971), Russian female volleyball player
- Andrey Alshevskikh (born 1972), Russian political figure
- Sergei Bulatov (born 1972), Russian professional football coach and a former player
- Yevgeni Davletshin (born 1972), Russian football player
- Dmitry Gusev (born 1972), Russian professional campaign manager and a deputy of the 8th State Duma
- Andrey Klishas (born 1972), Russian politician and jurist
- Marat Safin (born 1972), Russian football player
- Igor Shulepov (born 1972), Russian volleyball player
- Vadim Tokarev (born 1972), American-based Russian cruiserweight boxer
- Vyacheslav Bakharev (born 1973), Russian football player
- Alexander Dorosinskiy (born 1973), Russian racing car driver and entrepreneur
- Valeri Goryushev (1973–2014), Russian volleyball player
- Tatyana Grachova (born 1973), Russian volleyball player
- Eduard Isakov (born 1973), Russian politician serving as a senator from the Khanty-Mansi Autonomous Okrug since 14 September 2015
- Nikolai Khabibulin (born 1973), Russian professional ice hockey goaltender
- Natalya Morozova (born 1973), Russian volleyball player
- Ilya Ratnichkin (born 1973), Russian professional footballer
- Dmitry Sinitsyn (born 1973), Russian Nordic combined skier
- Serguei Smetanine (born 1973), Russian racing cyclist
- Andrey Smirnov (born 1973), Russian wheelchair curler
- Yana Troyanova (born 1973), Russian theater and film actress
- Alexander Vysokinsky (born 1973), Russian politician serving as a senator from Sverdlovsk Oblast
- Alexander Vyukhin (1973–2011), Ukrainian professional ice hockey goaltender of Russian ethnicity
- Alexei Yashin (born 1973), Russian professional ice hockey centerman
- Alexei Aidarov (born 1974), Russian-born former Belarusian (until 2006) and Ukrainian (since 2007) biathlete
- Oleg Dozmorov (born 1974), Russian writer and poet
- Marina Khalturina (born 1974), Russian-born Kazakhstani figure skater
- Svetlana Leshukova (born 1974), Russian swimmer
- Vladislav Otmakhov (born 1974), Russian professional ice hockey defenceman
- Vladimir Presnyakov (born 1974), Russian writer, screenwriter, director, theatre producer
- Boris Ryzhy (1974–2001), Russian poet
- Yevgeniya Artamonova (born 1975), Russian female volleyball player
- Aleksandr Gerasimov (born 1975), Russian volleyball player
- Natalia Paderina (born 1975), Russian sport shooter
- Sergey Prokopyev (born 1975), Russian cosmonaut
- Ekaterina Siurina (born 1975), Russian operatic soprano

==== 1976–1980 ====
- Olga Kotlyarova (born 1976), Russian runner
- Alexander Lapshin (born 1976), Soviet-born travel blogger and journalist
- Igor Lukanin (born 1976), Russian competitive ice dancer who competed internationally for Azerbaijan with Kristin Fraser
- Dmitri Naumkin (born 1976), Russian competitive ice dancer
- Svetlana Nesterova (born 1976), Russian composer and violinist
- Andrei Shabanov (born 1976), Russian football and futsal player
- Roman Skorniakov (born 1976), Russian-born figure skater who mainly represented Uzbekistan
- Boris Dyakonov (born 1977), Russian banker
- Yelena Godina (born 1977), Russian volleyball player
- Galina Likhachova (born 1977), Russian speed skater
- Igor Malinovsky (born 1977), Russian concert violinist and Professor of Violin
- Denis Sokolov (born 1977), Russian professional ice hockey defenceman
- Sergei Svetlakov (born 1977), Russian comedian, film and television actor
- Alina Bronsky (born 1978), Russian-born German writer
- Alexei Bulatov (born 1978), Russian professional ice hockey forward
- Yulia Chicherina (born 1978), Russian pop-rock artist
- Pavel Datsyuk (born 1978), Russian professional ice hockey player and alternate captain for the Detroit Red Wings of the National Hockey League (NHL)
- Andrey Deyev (born 1978), Russian fencer
- Sergey Kofanov (born 1978), Russian mountaineer
- Kirill Ladygin (born 1978), Russian auto racing driver
- Mikhail Mikushin (born 1978), Russian scientist
- Elias Pavlidis (born 1978), Greek amateur boxer
- Valeri Pokrovsky (born 1978), Russian professional ice hockey defenceman
- Olga Sharutenko (born 1978), Russian ice dancer
- Vitaliy Smirnov (born 1978), Russian-Uzbekistani decathlete
- Yelena Vasilevskaya (born 1978), Russian volleyball player
- Stanislav Morozov (born 1979), former pair skater
- Alexander Motylev (born 1979), Russian chess grandmaster
- Yevgeny Salakhov (born 1979), Russian sprint canoer
- Alexei Simakov (born 1979), Russian professional ice hockey forward
- Sergei Stupin (born 1979), Russian professional ice hockey defenceman
- Yuta (singer) (born 1979), Russian singer, composer, songwriter and actress
- Vyacheslav Chistyakov (born 1980), Russian professional ice hockey forward
- Yevgeni Fyodorov (born 1980), Russian professional ice hockey centre
- Sergei Khoroshun (born 1980), Russian professional ice hockey goaltender
- Denis Kochetkov (born 1980), Russian professional ice hockey forward
- Andrei Mukhachyov (born 1980), Russian professional ice hockey defenceman
- Konstantin Syomin (born 1980), Russian journalist and TV news presenter
- Aleksei Volkov (born 1980), Russian professional hockey goaltender
- Leonid Volkov (born 1980), Russian politician

==== 1981–1985 ====
- Tatyana Dektyareva (born 1981), Russian track and field athlete
- Irina Denezhkina (born 1981), Russian controversial writer
- Damir Khamadiyev (born 1981), Russian futsal player
- Igor Magogin (born 1981), Russian professional ice hockey centre
- Andrei Shefer (born 1981), Russian professional ice hockey defenceman
- Yekaterina Smolentseva (born 1981), Russian female ice hockey player
- Aleksey Tsvetkov (born 1981), Russian skier
- Ivan Alypov (born 1982), Russian cross-country skier
- Daniil Barantsev (born 1982), Russian-American competitive ice dancer
- Maxim Bolotin (born 1982), Russian competitive ice dancer
- Vasili Brovin (born 1982), Russian professional footballer
- Nikolay Pankratov (born 1982), Russian cross-country skier
- Natalia Ponomareva (born 1982), Russian-Uzbekistani pair skater
- Alexander Tatarinov (born 1982), Russian professional ice hockey winger
- Artyom Fidler (born 1983), Russian professional footballer
- Mariya Netesova (born 1983), Russian rhythmic gymnast and Olympic champion (2000)
- Nautilus Pompilius (1983–1997), Soviet and Russian rock band
- Nataliya Shalagina (born 1983), Russian swimmer
- Olga Stulneva (born 1983), Russian athlete and bobsledder
- Svetlana Terentieva (born 1983), Russian ice hockey forward
- Irina Zilber (born 1983), Russian rhythmic gymnast and Olympic champion (2000)
- Chaif (formed 1984), Russian rock band
- Elena Murzina (born 1984), Russian rhythmic gymnast and Olympic champion (2004)
- Yury Prilukov (born 1984), Russian freestyle swimmer
- Agatha Christie (founded 1985), Soviet and Russian rock band
- Alexander Kudryavtsev (born 1985), Russian professional tennis player
- Georgi Misharin (born 1985), Russian professional ice hockey defenseman
- Sergei Nemolodyshev (born 1985), Russian professional ice hockey winger
- Alexei Puninski (born 1985), Russian-born Croatian swimmer
- Diana Rennik (born 1985), Russian-born Estonian pair skater
- Marina Sheshenina (born 1985), Russian female volleyball player

==== 1986–1990 ====
- Konstantin Agapov (born 1986), Russian futsal player
- Alexandra Ageeva (born 1986), Russian opposition journalist
- Pavel Korpachev (born 1986), Russian freestyle skier
- Ivan Kovalev (born 1986), Russian professional racing cyclist
- Elena Melnik (born 1986), Russian fashion model
- Stepan Poistogov (born 1986), Russian middle-distance runner
- Vera Sessina (born 1986), Russian individual rhythmic gymnast
- Elena Turysheva (born 1986), Russian cross country skier
- Denis Galimzyanov (born 1987), Russian racing cyclist
- Anastasia Gorshkova (born 1987), Russian competitive ice dancer
- Alena Kaufman (born 1987), Russian paralympic biathlete and skier
- Igor Lysyj (born 1987), Russian chess grandmaster
- Aleksandra Pasynkova (born 1987), Russian female volleyball player
- Dmitri Rusanov (born 1987), Russian former professional footballer
- Maria Smolnikova (born 1987), Russian actress
- Kirill Starkov (born 1987), Danish ice hockey player of Russian ethnicity
- Igor Yudin (born 1987), Australian volleyball player with Russian origins
- Kseniya Aksyonova (born 1988), Russian track and field sprinter
- Egor Baranov (born 1988), Russian film director
- Victoria Chaplina (born 1988), Russian female former volleyball player
- Aliya Garayeva (born 1988), retired gymnast, she represented Russia (until 2005) and Azerbaijan (2006–2012)
- Evgeny Kurbatov (born 1988), Russian professional ice hockey defenceman
- Nikita Lobintsev (born 1988), Russian freestyle swimmer
- Yegor Nikolayev (born 1988), Russian runner
- Yuliya Pidluzhnaya (born 1988), Russian long jumper
- Anastasia Poltoratskaya (born 1988), Russian tennis player
- Yury Postrigay (born 1988), Russian canoeist
- Valeri Sokolov (born 1988), Russian professional football player
- Alexander Yukseyev (born 1988), Russian ice hockey defenceman
- Smyslovye Gallyutsinatsii (formed 1989), Russian rock band
- Yekaterina Lebedeva (born 1989), Russian ice hockey forward
- Ivan Sozonov (born 1989), Russian badminton player
- Angelika Timanina (born 1989), Russian competitor in synchronized swimming
- Dimitri Tsyganov (born 1989), Russian professional ice hockey player
- Alexandr Zaboev (born 1989), Russian pair skater
- Alexander Antropov (born 1990), Russian former professional ice hockey player
- Sergei Chistyakov (born 1990), Russian ice hockey player
- Ivan Chudin (born 1990), Russian professional football player
- Anna Gavrilenko (born 1990), Russian group rhythmic gymnast and Olympic champion
- Ekaterina Kosianenko (born 1990), Russian volleyball player
- Fedor Malykhin (born 1990), Russian professional ice hockey forward
- Alyona Mamina (born 1990), Russian track and field sprinter
- Vladimir Mineev (born 1990), Russian heavyweight kickboxer and mixed martial artist
- Anatoli Nikontsev (born 1990), Russian professional ice hockey winger
- Sergey Sviridov (born 1990), Russian decathlete

==== 1991–2000 ====
- Yekaterina Ananina (born 1991), Russian ice hockey forward
- Andrei Ankudinov (born 1991), Russian ice hockey player
- Irina Antonenko (born 1991), Russian actress, model and beauty pageant titleholder
- Sergey Karyakin (born 1991), Russian rally raid driver
- Natalia Perminova (born 1991), Russian badminton player
- Valeria Savinykh (born 1991), Russian tennis player
- Filipp Savchenko (born 1991), Russian ice hockey player
- David Belyavskiy (born 1992), Russian artistic gymnast
- Stefan Stepanov (born 1992), Russian professional ice hockey defenceman
- Mikhail Ustyantsev (born 1992), Russian ice hockey player
- Alexander Zakirov (born 1992), Russian ice hockey player
- Vera Bazarova (born 1993), Russian pair skater
- Kseniia Ilchenko (born 1994), Russian female volleyball player
- Kristina Ilinykh (born 1994), Russian diver
- Oleksiy Khoblenko (born 1994), Ukrainian football striker
- Anastasia Kobekina (born 1994), Russian cellist
- Roman Manukhov (born 1994), Russian professional ice hockey defenceman
- Maxim Miroshkin (born 1994), Russian pair skater
- Nikita Tryamkin (born 1994), Russian ice hockey defenceman
- Elbeyi Guliyev (born 1995), Azerbaijani professional football player
- Maxim Kovtun (born 1995), Russian figure skater
- Ilya Leshukov (born 1995), Russian beach volleyball player
- Olga Morozova (born 1995), Russian badminton player
- Polina Popova (born 1995), Russian model and beauty pageant titleholder who was crowned Miss Russia 2017
- Aleksandr Sobolev (born 1995), Russian professional football player
- Maria Temnikova (born 1995), Russian swimmer
- Klava Koka (born 1996), Russian singer, songwriter and YouTuber
- Anton Mamaev (born 1997), Russian competitive snowboarder
- Artyom Mamin (born 1997), Russian football player
- Anastasiia Tatareva (born 1997), Russian group rhythmic gymnast
- Artyom Yusupov (born 1997), Russian football player
- Dmitrii Ialin (born 1998), Russian pair skater
- Yulia Lipnitskaya (born 1998), Russian figure skater
- Monetochka (born 1998), Russian singer-songwriter
- Daria Ustinova (born 1998), Russian backstroke swimmer
- Ivan Chekhovich (born 1999), ice hockey winger
- Aleksei Mamin (born 1999), Russian football player
- Sergei Slepov (born 1999), Russian football player
- Aleksandr Galimov (born 2000), Russian football player
- Viktoriia Meshkova (born 2000), Russian rock climber
- Egor Sokolov (born 2000), Russian professional ice hockey left winger

=== 21st century ===
- Sweetie Fox (born 2001), Russian pornographic actress, model and cosplayer
- Kamilla Rakhimova (born 2001), Russian professional tennis player
- Danil Gushchin (born 2002), Russian professional ice hockey player
- Yegor Mosin (born 2003), Russian football player
- Jelizaveta Žuková (born 2003), Russian-Czech pair skater
- Kristina Dudina (born 2004), Russian judoka and sambo competitor
- Ilya Ishkov (born 2005), Russian football player

== Lived in Yekaterinburg ==
- Onésime Clerc (1845-1920), Russian naturalist of Swiss origin
- Pavel Bazhov (1879–1950), Russian writer; between 1889 and 1893 he studied in a religious school in Yekaterinburg
- Dmitry Kharitonov (1896–1970), the first native Russian arachnologist
- Sergei Vonsovsky (1910–1998), Soviet and Russian physicist; Honorary citizen of Yekaterinburg. One of the streets of Yekaterinburg is called after academician Vonsovsky.
- Chiang Fang-liang (1916–2004), wife of President Chiang Ching-kuo and served as First Lady of the Republic of China on Taiwan from 1978 to 1988; moved to Yekaterinburg during World War I
- Gennady Mesyats (born 1936), Russian physicist, founder of several scientific schools; Honorary citizen of Yekaterinburg
- Eduard Rossel (born 1937), Russian politician of German origin, governor (1995–2009) of Sverdlovsk Oblast; Honorary citizen of Yekaterinburg
- Nikolay Karpol (born 1938), national women volleyball team coach (VC Uralochka-NTMK Yekaterinburg); Honorary Citizen of the Sverdlovsk Oblast
- Vladislav Krapivin (1938–2020), Russian children's books writer; Honorary citizen of Yekaterinburg
- Arkady Chernetsky (born 1950), Russian politician; Mayor of Yekaterinburg (1992–2010)
- Vassily Sigarev (born 1977), Russian playwright, screenwriter and film director; graduated from the Yekaterinburg Theatre Institute
- Louis J. Marinelli (born 1986), American activist, self-subscribed Californian nationalist activist, migrated from the United States due to Anti-Russian hysteria.
- Sofia Nikitchuk (born 1993), Russian actress, model and beauty pageant titleholder who was crowned Miss Russia 2015

== See also ==
- List of Russian people
- List of Russian-language poets
