= Yan Arlazorov =

Russian actor and stand-up comic

- Born: 26 August 1947; Moscow, RSFSR, USSR
- Died: 7 August 2009 (aged 61); Moscow, Russia
- Occupations: actor, humorist, radio host
- Years active: 1972—2009
- Title: Honored Artist of Russia (1997)
- Awards: Order of Honour (2008)

Yan Mayorovich Arlazorov (Russian: Ян Майорович Арлазоров; August 26, 1947 – March 7, 2009) was a Soviet and Russian theater actor, comedian and entertainer, Honored Artist of Russia (1997), winner of the All-Russian Competition of Variety Artists.

== Biography ==
Born into a Jewish family, he was not the only child, as he had a younger brother, Leonid (born March 8, 1956) — a mathematician, Candidate of Sciences.

Is he went to school, where was the first school theater in Moscow. According to him, he had a wonderful teacher who allowed him to do everything to express himself. From junior classes, he dreamed of becoming an actor. Since he was very fat in childhood, he became involved in sports — wrestling, swimming, and tennis.

Jan graduated from the Boris Shchukin Theatre Institute, worked at the Central Children's Theater. From late 1970s he served in the Mossovet Theatre, in the early 1990s he switched to the stage.

In the late 1990s, he conducted broadcast People's Ambulance on the AvtoRadio radio station.

He starred in several films. He worked in humorous TV program Anshlag (author and presenter Regina Dubovitskaya).

In 1995, he won the Arkady Raikin Cup at the Comedy International Festival in Riga.

The actor wrote his monologues, as a rule, himself, but he also resorted to the help of professional variety playwrights — Anatoly Trushkin, Semyon Altov, Efim Smolin, Mariana Belenky, Alexander Dudoladov.

In 2008, President of Russia Vladimir Putin was awarded the Order of Honour.

== Death ==
Arlazorov died on March 7, 2009, at the age of 62, after a severe and prolonged illness (cancer, according to some sources, a stomach tumor affecting the gallbladder and pancreas). The reason for the tragic outcome was Arlazorov’s unwillingness to operate for a long time, and he tried to heal with starvation and went to healers. Farewell to Yan was held at the State Variety Theater. In March 11, he was buried at Vostryakovskoye Cemetery in Moscow.

== Personal life ==
He was married to the actress of theater and cinema, Yola Sanko. He had a daughter, Alyona.
