= Tsyganov =

Tsyganov (Russian: Цыганов; masculine) or Tsyganova (Цыганова; feminine) is a Russian language ethnonymic surname derived from the term "tsygan" (цыган) meaning Gypsy. The patronymic suffix '-ov' indicates that it is a patronymic surname literally meaning "son of a person nicknamed 'Tsygan'".

The surname may refer to:

Tsyganov

- Dimitri Tsyganov (born 1989), Russian ice hockey player
- Nikolay Tsyganov (1797–1832), Russian poet, singer and actor
- Sergey Tsyganov (born 1992), Russian footballer
- Valeri Tsyganov (born 1956), Soviet alpine skier
- Viktor Tsyganov (1896–1944), Soviet Lieutenant General
- Yevgeny Tsyganov, Russian stage and film actor, director, screenwriter and composer

Tsyganova

- Monika Tsõganova (born 1969), Estonian chess player
- Natalya Tsyganova (born 1971), Ukrainian-Russian middle-distance runner
- Vika Tsyganova (born 1963), Russian singer
- Monika Tsõganova (born 1969), Estonian chess Woman International Master

== See also ==
- Tsygan (disambiguation), Russian surname
- Tsygankov
