= Antropov =

Antropov is a surname. Notable people with the surname include:

- Aleksey Antropov (1716–1795), Russian painter
- Alexander Antropov (born 1990), Russian ice hockey player
- Andrey Antropov (born 1967), Russian badminton player
- Egor Antropov (born 1992), Russian ice hockey defenceman
- Ilya Antropov (born 1997), Russian football player
- Nik Antropov (born 1980), Kazakh-Canadian ice hockey centre
- Robert Antropov (born 1965), Estonian politician

== See also ==
- Oļegs Antropovs (born 1947), Latvian volleyball player
