= Svetlana Rozhkova =

Russian actress and humorist

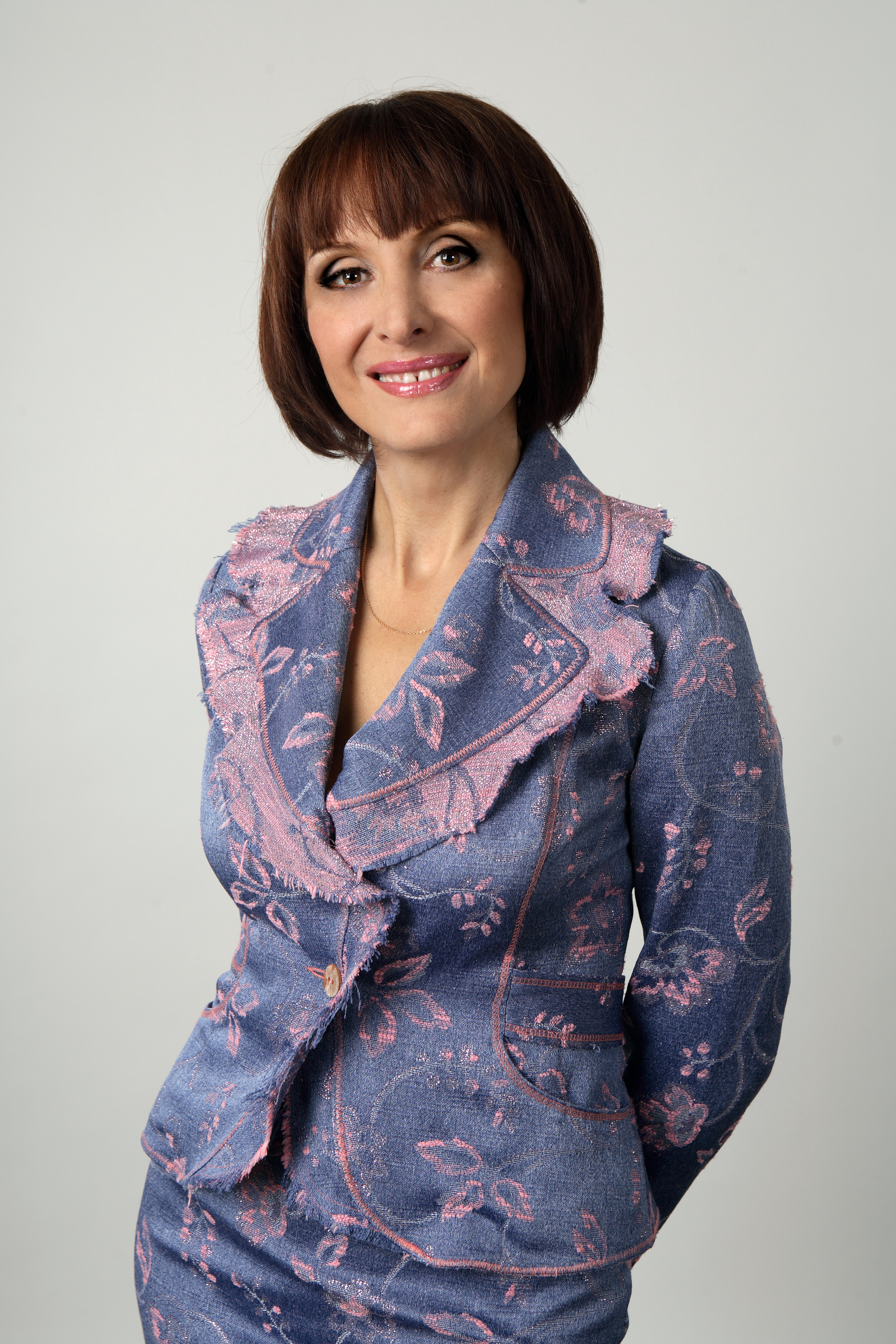
- Svetlana Rozhkova in 2008
- Born: 16 February 1965 (age 61); Mozhaisk, Moscow Oblast, RSFSR, USSR
- Occupations: actress humorist

Svetlana Anatolievna Rozhkova (Russian: Светлана Анатольевна Рожкова; 16 February 1965, Mozhaisk) is a Russian humorist, an actress of a conversational genre. Honored Artist of Russia (30 August 1996).

She was born on 16 February 1965 in Mozhaisk, into the family of Elena Mikhailovna Rozhkova and Anatoly Ivanovich Rozhkov.

She studied at Russian State Institute of Performing Arts. Graduated GITIS in 1986.

Since the late 1990s, she has been a regular participant in humorous programs and concerts, including appearances on the show of Yevgeny Petrosyan and Regina Dubovitskaya.

== Personal life ==
- First husband — Andrei Bogdanov, musician and drummer, now lives abroad.
  - Oldest daughter — Yana, a linguist, knows English, Norwegian, Italian and Spanish.
- Second husband — Yuri Yevdokunin (born March 5, 1967) a singer and director. We met in Kislovodsk, when she worked as an entertainer.
  - Younger daughter — Varvara, student Sholokhov Moscow State University for Humanities (vocal art) workshop of Sergey Penkin.
