= Denis Sokolov =

Denis Sokolov may refer to:

- Denis Sokolov (ice hockey) (born 1977), Russian ice hockey defenceman
- Denis Sokolov (sport shooter) (born 1983), Russian rifle shooter
