= Shabanov =

Shabanov (Russian: Шабанов) is a Russian masculine surname, its feminine counterpart is Shabanova. Notable people with the surname include:

- Andrei Shabanov (born 1976), Russian football and futsal player
- Anna Shabanova (1848–1932), Russian pediatrician and women's rights activist
- Artem Shabanov (born 1992), Ukrainian football player
- Dmitri Shabanov (born 1964), Russian Olympic sailor
- Ismail Shabanov, President of the Talysh diaspora of Russia
- Konstantin Shabanov (born 1989), Russian hurdler
- Maxim Shabanov (born 2000), Russian ice hockey player
- Rafiga Shabanova (born 1943), Azerbaijani handball player
- Sergei Shabanov (born 1974), Belarusian ice hockey goaltender
- Svyatoslav Shabanov (born 1993), Russian football defender
- Yuri Shabanov (1937–2010), Russian chess grandmaster
