= Tsygan =

Tsygan (Russian: Цыган, "Gypsy") may refer to:

- Mykola Tsygan, Russian/Ukrainian football goalkeeper
- Boris Tsygan, Ukrainian American mathematician, the author of the concept of cyclic homology
- Tsygan, a Soviet space dog

== See also ==
- Tsyganov, Russian surname
