= Tsygankov =

Tsygankov or Tsyhankov (Russian: Цыганков) is a Russian masculine surname originating from the word tsygan, meaning a gypsy; its feminine counterpart is Tsygankova or Tsyhankova. Notable people with the surname include:

- Aleksandr Tsygankov (born 1968), Russian footballer and coach
- Andrei Tsygankov, Russian-American international relations scholar and academic
- Anna Tsygankova (born 1979), Russian ballet dancer
- Boris Tsygankov (born 1998), Russian football player
- Gennadiy Tsygankov (1947–2006), Soviet and Russian hockey player
- Viktor Tsyhankov (born 1997), Ukrainian football player

== See also ==
- Tsyganov
