= Sergei Khoroshun =

Russian professional ice hockey goaltender

- Born: June 27, 1980 (age 45) Yekaterinburg, Russian SFSR; Soviet Union
- Height: 5 ft 10 in (178 cm)
- Weight: 172 lb (78 kg; 12 st 4 lb)
- Position: Goalie
- Catches: Left
- FFHG Division 1 team Former teams: Epinal Hockey Club; Dinamo-Energija Yekaterinburg; HC Neftekhimik Nizhnekamsk; Vityaz Chekov; HC '05 Banská Bystrica; HC Berkut; Aigles de Nice
- Playing career: 1998–present

Sergei Khoroshun (born June 27, 1980) is a Russian professional ice hockey goaltender playing for Epinal Hockey Club of the FFHG Division 1.

Khoroshun previously played in the Kontinental Hockey League for HC Neftekhimik Nizhnekamsk and Vityaz Chekov. He also played one game for Dinamo-Energija Yekaterinburg in the Russian Superleague. He also played in the Tipsport Liga for HC '05 Banská Bystrica and the Ligue Magnus for Aigles de Nice.
