= Oleg Dozmorov =

Russian writer and poet

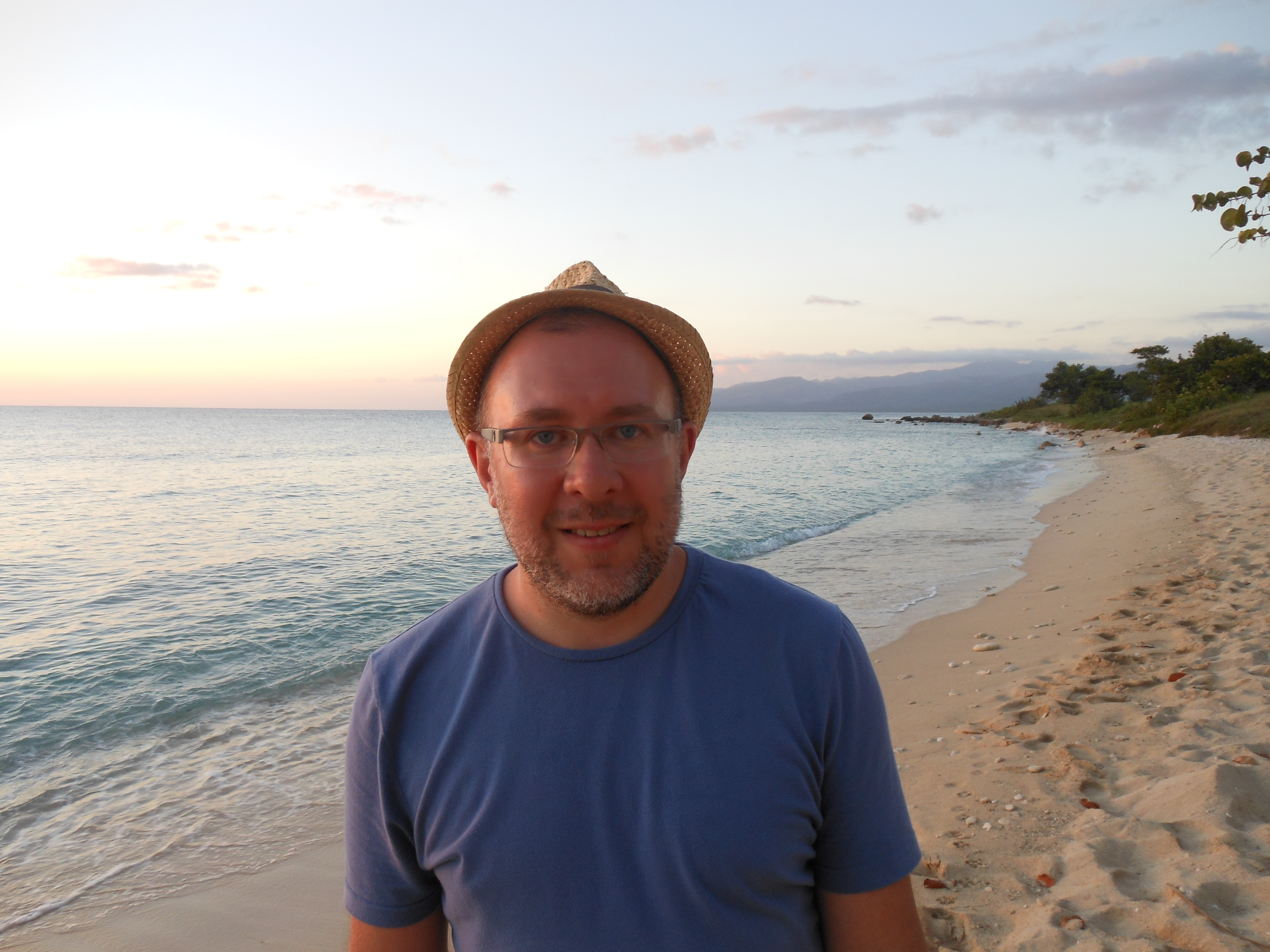
Oleg Dozmorov

Oleg Dozmorov (Russian: Оле́г Вита́льевич До́зморов, IPA: [ɐˈlʲek vʲɪˈtalʲjɪvʲɪdʑ ˈdozmərəf]; born 1974 in Yekaterinburg, Soviet Union) is a Russian writer and poet, the author of several collections of poetry. His poems are translated into Italian, English and Dutch. His International Retreat for Writers fellowship at Hawthornden Castle resulted in a semi-fictional story Premiya "Mramor" (which can be loosely translated into English as Marble Award). It was published by Znamia in 2006. "Vosmistishiya", a 2004 collection of octaves, by Oleg Dozmorov can be found here.

== Critique ==
About "Смотреть на бегемота":

"Смотреть на бегемота" (Take a look at the hippopotamus) – with this book for the first time (for me and probably for others) Oleg Dozmorov has carved his place in the modern poetry.
