= Dmitri Rusanov =

Russian footballer

Personal information
- Full name: Dmitri Andreyevich Rusanov
- Date of birth: 25 June 1987 (age 39)
- Place of birth: Sverdlovsk, Russian SFSR
- Height: 1.80 m (5 ft 11 in)
- Position: Forward

Senior career*
Years	Team	Apps	(Gls)
2006	FC Zenit Chelyabinsk	22	(1)
2007	FC Tyumen	10	(0)
2008	FC Mordovia Saransk	6	(0)
2009	FC Ural Yekaterinburg	14	(0)
- * Club domestic league appearances and goals

Dmitri Andreyevich Rusanov (Russian: Дмитрий Андреевич Русанов; born 25 June 1987) is a former Russian professional football player.

== Club career ==
He played in the Russian Football National League for FC Ural Yekaterinburg in 2009.
