= Vladislav Otmakhov =

Russian ice hockey player

- Born: May 29, 1974 (age 50); Yekaterinburg, Russian SFSR, Soviet Union
- Height: 5 ft 10 in (178 cm)
- Weight: 196 lb (89 kg; 14 st 0 lb)
- Position: Defence
- Shot: Left
- Played for: Dinamo-Energija Yekaterinburg; CSK VVS Samara; Molot-Prikamye Perm; Torpedo Nizhny Novgorod; Avtomobilist Yekaterinburg
- Playing career: 1992–2011

Vladislav Otmakhov (born May 29, 1974) is a Russian former professional ice hockey defenceman. He played for Dinamo-Energija Yekaterinburg, CSK VVS Samara, Molot-Prikamye Perm, Torpedo Nizhny Novgorod and Avtomobilist Yekaterinburg.

== Career statistics ==
			Regular season					Playoffs
Season	Team	League	GP	G	A	Pts	PIM	GP	G	A	Pts	PIM
1992–93	Avtomobilist Yekaterinburg	Russia	34	0	1	1	14	—	—	—	—	—
1992–93	Avtomobilist Yekaterinburg-2	Russia3	—	2	1	3	2	—	—	—	—	—
1992–93	Kedr Novouralsk	Russia2	5	1	0	1	0	—	—	—	—	—
1993–94	Avtomobilist Yekaterinburg	Russia	38	1	4	5	22	—	—	—	—	—
1993–94	Avtomobilist Yekaterinburg-2	Russia3	2	0	0	0	0	—	—	—	—	—
1994–95	Avtomobilist Yekaterinburg	Russia	38	0	2	2	12	2	0	0	0	0
1994–95	SKA-Avtomobilist Yekaterinburg-2	Russia2	9	2	2	4	8	—	—	—	—	—
1995–96	CSK VVS Samara	Russia	49	2	1	3	12	—	—	—	—	—
1996–97	Spartak Yekaterinburg	Russia	3	0	1	1	0	—	—	—	—	—
1996–97	SKA Yekaterinburg	Russia3	2	0	0	0	0	—	—	—	—	—
1997–98	Dinamo-Energija Yekaterinburg	Russia	26	1	1	2	22	—	—	—	—	—
1998–99	Dinamo-Energija Yekaterinburg	Russia2	36	3	6	9	22	—	—	—	—	—
1999–00	Dinamo-Energija Yekaterinburg	Russia	32	2	4	6	24	3	0	0	0	0
1999–00	Dinamo-Energija Yekaterinburg-2	Russia3	3	1	1	2	2	—	—	—	—	—
2000–01	Molot-Prikamye Perm	Russia	24	0	2	2	8	—	—	—	—	—
2001–02	Molot-Prikamye Perm	Russia	51	1	5	6	29	—	—	—	—	—
2002–03	Sputnik Nizhny Tagil	Russia2	12	1	1	2	26	—	—	—	—	—
2002–03	Molot-Prikamye Perm	Russia	28	0	1	1	24	—	—	—	—	—
2003–04	Molot-Prikamye Perm	Russia2	46	1	12	13	26	13	0	0	0	6
2004–05	Molot-Prikamye Perm	Russia	56	1	8	9	18	—	—	—	—	—
2005–06	Molot-Prikamye Perm	Russia	40	2	4	6	55	—	—	—	—	—
2005–06	Molot-Prikamye Perm-2	Russia3	2	0	1	1	0	—	—	—	—	—
2006–07	Torpedo Nizhny Novgorod	Russia2	34	1	9	10	30	—	—	—	—	—
2007–08	Torpedo Nizhny Novgorod	Russia	31	0	1	1	6	—	—	—	—	—
2007–08	Torpedo Gorky NN	Russia3	4	3	2	5	2	—	—	—	—	—
2008–09	Avtomobilist Yekaterinburg	Russia2	52	6	23	29	26	7	0	2	2	35
2009–10	Avtomobilist Yekaterinburg	KHL	40	4	5	9	22	3	0	0	0	0
2010–11	Avtomobilist Yekaterinburg	KHL	29	0	4	4	20	—	—	—	—	—
Russia totals			450	10	35	45	246	29	3	5	8	18
