= Boris Dyakonov =

Russian banker (born 1977)

- Born: March 2, 1977 (age 48); Sverdlovsk, USSR
- Occupation(s): Co-founder and director of ANNA money

Boris Dyakonov (Russian: Борис Петрович Дьяконов), born March 2, 1977, Yekaterinburg, USSR, is a former Russian banker, the co-founder and ex-director of the “Tochka” bank for entrepreneurs. Co-founder and director for ANNA money, UK based fintech startup. Before that he headed Bank24.ru.

== Biography ==
=== Education ===
Boris Dyakonov was born in Yekaterinburg (in Soviet times — Sverdlovsk) and got into the Faculty of Philosophy of the Ural State University. Then he went on to study at Centenary College of Louisiana, from which he graduated with honors in 1998 (Bachelor of Arts).

In 2000 he graduated from the Moscow State Social University with honors. In 2001, Dyakonov received Candidate of Sciences in pedagogy. Later he became an associate professor at the Ural Federal University.

In 2003, Boris Dyakonov was certified by the International Project Management Association (IPMA) and the National Project Management Association (SOVNET) and became a Certified Project Manager (CPM) managing projects of “B” Level.

In 2004 he passed the exam at the courses of the leading auditor of the quality management systems ISO 9001:2000 (IRCA).

== Career ==
In 1998, Boris Dyakonov began working at the bank Severnaya Kazna. Until 2002 he worked as an Internet technologies engineer, a head of the information system support department and then as a head of the innovative technologies department.

In October 2002, he was invited by Sergei Lapshin, the founder of UralContactBank (the future Bank24.ru), to become a co-owner of the bank. Later he got promoted to the position of the first deputy chairman of the bank. When the 99.5% of the “Bank24.ru” shares were sold to the Life financial group in December 2008, Dyakonov owned 20% of the bank. Boris Dyakonov continued to work on the board of directors after the acquisition, and in February 2014 he was appointed as an executive director of the bank.

Together with Eduard Panteleev, Boris Dyakonov co-ordinated numerous projects of “Bank24.ru”: the change and modernization of the bank's information system, entering Visa membership, creation of its own card processing, modernization and the launch of the contact center, creation of a management quality system, the integration of the project management system into the bank's activities, the launch of the loan service program and the entrepreneur-oriented intra-bank start-up "Knopka", etc.

After the bank's license was revoked in September 2014 and all its obligations to clients were closed, Boris Dyakonov moved to the position of senior vice president of the Khanty-Mansiysk bank “Otkrytie”. Dyakonov took the whole Bank24.ru team of 350 employees to the new bank and started to create a service for small businesses under the brand name Tochka (Russian: Точка — Point). It was launched in early 2015. For his efforts to preserve the clients’ funds and the bank's team, Boris Dyakonov received the Bank of the Year Award of the Banki.ru portal in the nomination “Banker of the Year”. In 2017, the bank "Tochka" became the leader of the banking rating of Markswebb Rank & Report in three categories — "Bank for self-employed entrepreneurs without employees", "Bank for Trade and Service Companies" and "Bank for companies engaged in foreign trade activities". As of early 2017, the bank's net promoter score was 72.4%, the best rate among Russian banks.

In 2017, Boris Dyakonov together with banked and investor Eduard Panteleyev launched an UK-based neobank Anna.

== Hobbies ==
Boris Dyakonov is fond of yachting, swimming, and life hacking. He is an instructor and master mariner.
