= Yevgeni Davletshin =

Russian footballer

Personal information
- Full name: Yevgeni Gennadyevich Davletshin
- Date of birth: 21 April 1972 (age 54)
- Place of birth: Sverdlovsk, Russian SFSR
- Height: 1.70 m (5 ft 7 in)
- Position: Midfielder

Youth career
- FC Uralmash Sverdlovsk

Senior career*
Years	Team	Apps	(Gls)
1989	FC Uralmash Sverdlovsk	9	(0)
1989	FC MTsOP-Metallurg Verkhnyaya Pyshma	1	(0)
1991–1993	FC Uralmash Yekaterinburg	21	(1)
1994–1995	FC Uralets Nizhny Tagil	9	(3)
- * Club domestic league appearances and goals

Yevgeni Gennadyevich Davletshin (Russian: Евгений Геннадьевич Давлетшин; born 21 April 1972 in Sverdlovsk) is a former Russian football player.
