= Igor Magogin =

Russian ice hockey player

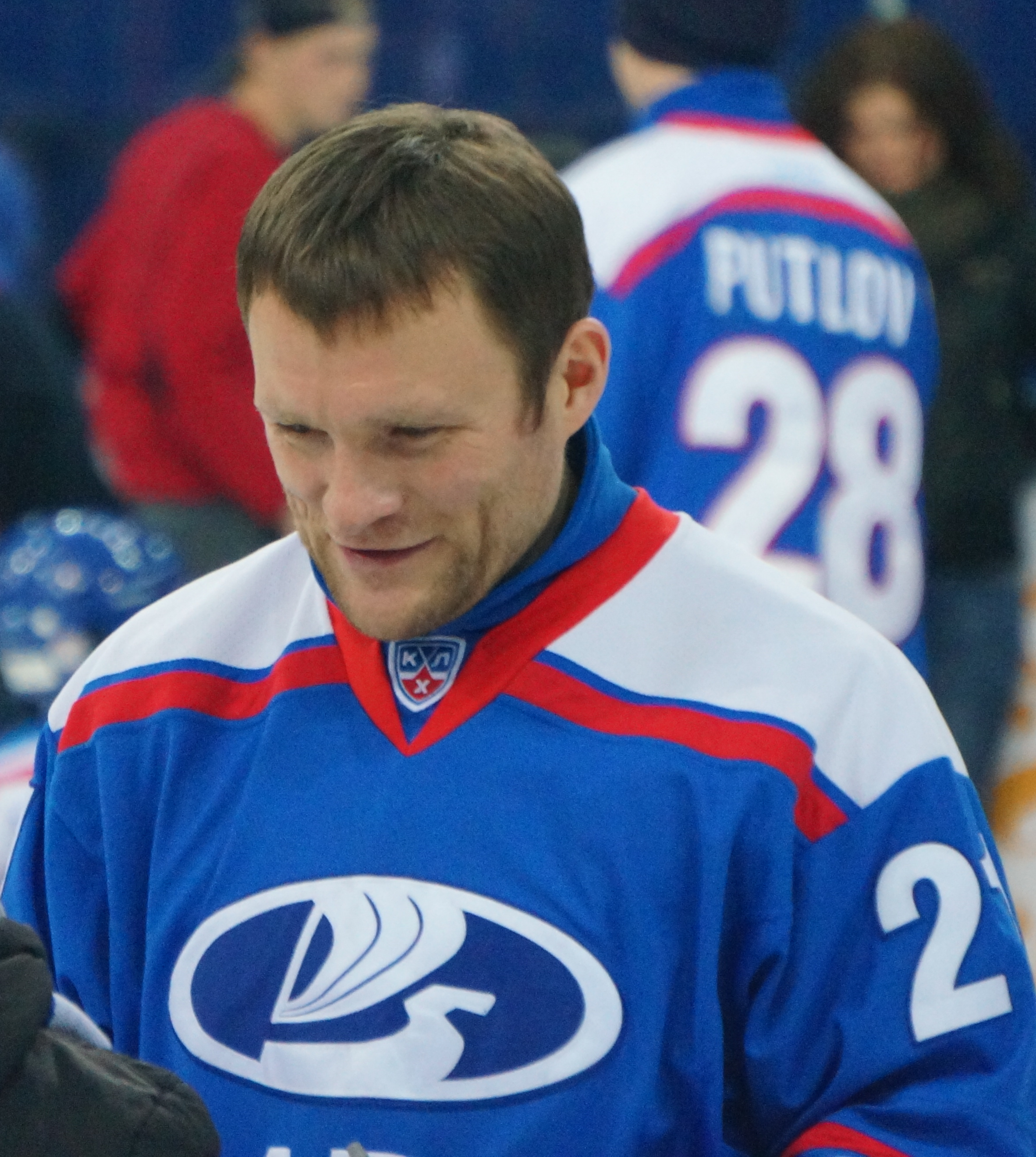
- Born: September 16, 1981 (age 43); Sverdlovsk, Russian SFSR
- Height: 5 ft 8 in (173 cm)
- Weight: 183 lb (83 kg; 13 st 1 lb)
- Position: Center
- Shot: Left
- Played for: Rubin Tyumen; Sputnik Nizhny Tagil; Avtomobilist Yekaterinburg; HC Yugra; HC Lada Togliatti; Severstal Cherepovets; HC 07 Detva
- Playing career: 2000–2019

Igor Magogin (born September 16, 1981) is a Russian former professional ice hockey centre who last played for HC 07 Detva of the Slovak Extraliga. Magogin joined Severstal Cherepovets as a free agent on a one-year contract on May 3, 2016, after spending one season with HC Lada Togliatti.

== Career statistics ==
| | | | Regular season | | | | | Playoffs |
| Season | Team | League | GP | G | A | Pts | PIM | GP | G | A | Pts | PIM |
|---|---|---|---|---|---|---|---|---|---|---|---|---|
| 1997–98 | Dinamo-Energija Yekaterinburg-2 | Russia3 | 1 | 0 | 0 | 0 | 0 | — | — | — | — | — |
| 1998–99 | Rubin Tyumen-2 | Russia3 | 22 | 7 | 2 | 9 | 8 | — | — | — | — | — |
| 1999–00 | Rubin Tyumen-2 | Russia3 | 40 | 10 | 6 | 16 | 24 | — | — | — | — | — |
| 2000–01 | Rubin Tyumen | Russia2 | 19 | 2 | 1 | 3 | 12 | — | — | — | — | — |
| 2000–01 | Rubin Tyumen-2 | Russia3 | 28 | 12 | 12 | 24 | 32 | — | — | — | — | — |
| 2001–02 | Gazovik Tyumen | Russia2 | 45 | 14 | 17 | 31 | 34 | 14 | 2 | 2 | 4 | 2 |
| 2001–02 | Gazovik Univer | Russia3 | 12 | 4 | 10 | 14 | 16 | — | — | — | — | — |
| 2002–03 | Gazovik Tyumen | Russia2 | 42 | 17 | 16 | 33 | 22 | 10 | 2 | 1 | 3 | 8 |
| 2003–04 | Gazovik Tyumen | Russia2 | 54 | 13 | 19 | 32 | 42 | 4 | 0 | 2 | 2 | 2 |
| 2004–05 | Sputnik Nizhny Tagil | Russia2 | 52 | 7 | 18 | 25 | 20 | 6 | 2 | 3 | 5 | 2 |
| 2005–06 | Sputnik Nizhny Tagil | Russia2 | 47 | 11 | 16 | 27 | 46 | 9 | 4 | 1 | 5 | 6 |
| 2006–07 | Sputnik Nizhny Tagil | Russia2 | 47 | 12 | 22 | 34 | 20 | — | — | — | — | — |
| 2007–08 | Avtomobilist Yekaterinburg | Russia2 | 52 | 10 | 26 | 36 | 26 | 15 | 2 | 5 | 7 | 4 |
| 2008–09 | Avtomobilist Yekaterinburg | Russia2 | 42 | 22 | 24 | 46 | 24 | 7 | 2 | 3 | 5 | 8 |
| 2009–10 | Avtomobilist Yekaterinburg | KHL | 44 | 5 | 19 | 24 | 48 | 4 | 2 | 0 | 2 | 2 |
| 2010–11 | Avtomobilist Yekaterinburg | KHL | 47 | 7 | 11 | 18 | 34 | — | — | — | — | — |
| 2010–11 | Sputnik Nizhny Tagil | VHL | 8 | 1 | 4 | 5 | 0 | 4 | 1 | 1 | 2 | 2 |
| 2011–12 | Yugra Khanty-Mansiysk | KHL | 50 | 9 | 14 | 23 | 34 | — | — | — | — | — |
| 2012–13 | Yugra Khanty-Mansiysk | KHL | 47 | 7 | 15 | 22 | 24 | — | — | — | — | — |
| 2013–14 | Yugra Khanty-Mansiysk | KHL | 39 | 3 | 7 | 10 | 45 | — | — | — | — | — |
| 2014–15 | Yugra Khanty-Mansiysk | KHL | 56 | 9 | 18 | 27 | 24 | — | — | — | — | — |
| 2015–16 | HC Lada Togliatti | KHL | 39 | 3 | 10 | 13 | 30 | — | — | — | — | — |
| 2016–17 | Severstal Cherepovets | KHL | 42 | 4 | 4 | 8 | 24 | — | — | — | — | — |
| 2018–19 | HC 07 Detva | Slovak | 15 | 1 | 2 | 3 | 8 | — | — | — | — | — |
| KHL totals | | | 364 | 47 | 98 | 145 | 263 | 4 | 2 | 0 | 2 | 2 |
