= Alexander Yukseyev =

Russian ice hockey player

- Born: 5 March 1988 (age 38) Ekaterinburg, Russia
- Height: 6 ft 0 in (183 cm)
- Weight: 181 lb (82 kg; 12 st 13 lb)
- Position: Defence
- Shot: Left
- Played for: HK Piter; HC Spartak St. Petersburg; Zauralie Kurgan; Avangard Omsk; HC VMF St. Petersburg; Amur Khabarovsk; Avtomobilist Yekaterinburg; Saryarka Karagandy; Severstal Cherepovets; Metallurg Novokuznetsk; Torpedo Ust-Kamenogorsk
- Playing career: 2006–2022

Alexander Yukseyev (born 5 March 1988) is a Russian professional ice hockey defenceman. He is currently playing within the SKA Saint Petersburg organization of the Kontinental Hockey League (KHL).

Yukseyev made his Kontinental Hockey League (KHL) debut playing with Avangard Omsk during the 2008–09 KHL season.

== Career statistics ==
| | | | Regular season | | | | | Playoffs |
| Season | Team | League | GP | G | A | Pts | PIM | GP | G | A | Pts | PIM |
|---|---|---|---|---|---|---|---|---|---|---|---|---|
| 2006–07 | HK Piter | Russia3 | 68 | 7 | 26 | 33 | 102 | — | — | — | — | — |
| 2006–07 | HC Spartak St. Petersburg | Russia2 | 3 | 0 | 0 | 0 | 6 | — | — | — | — | — |
| 2007–08 | HK Piter | Russia3 | 40 | 5 | 8 | 13 | 60 | — | — | — | — | — |
| 2008–09 | Zauralie Kurgan | Russia2 | 16 | 1 | 0 | 1 | 24 | — | — | — | — | — |
| 2008–09 | Avangard Omsk | KHL | 4 | 0 | 0 | 0 | 2 | — | — | — | — | — |
| 2008–09 | Avangard Omsk-2 | Russia3 | 1 | 0 | 1 | 1 | 2 | — | — | — | — | — |
| 2008–09 | HC VMF St. Petersburg | Russia2 | 26 | 3 | 6 | 9 | 46 | — | — | — | — | — |
| 2009–10 | HC VMF St. Petersburg | Russia2 | 53 | 5 | 16 | 21 | 64 | 3 | 0 | 1 | 1 | 6 |
| 2010–11 | HC VMF St. Petersburg | VHL | 54 | 4 | 19 | 23 | 56 | 8 | 2 | 3 | 5 | 14 |
| 2011–12 | HC VMF St. Petersburg | VHL | 33 | 3 | 11 | 14 | 26 | 5 | 1 | 1 | 2 | 10 |
| 2011–12 | Amur Khabarovsk | KHL | 1 | 0 | 0 | 0 | 0 | — | — | — | — | — |
| 2012–13 | Avtomobilist Yekaterinburg | KHL | 37 | 2 | 2 | 4 | 20 | — | — | — | — | — |
| 2013–14 | Saryarka Karagandy | VHL | 36 | 0 | 4 | 4 | 26 | 8 | 0 | 0 | 0 | 4 |
| 2014–15 | Saryarka Karagandy | VHL | 47 | 4 | 14 | 18 | 56 | 16 | 0 | 1 | 1 | 6 |
| 2015–16 | Saryarka Karagandy | VHL | 48 | 8 | 17 | 25 | 30 | 13 | 2 | 4 | 6 | 27 |
| 2016–17 | Severstal Cherepovets | KHL | 2 | 0 | 0 | 0 | 2 | — | — | — | — | — |
| 2016–17 | Saryarka Karagandy | VHL | 13 | 1 | 3 | 4 | 6 | 11 | 0 | 3 | 3 | 12 |
| 2017–18 | Saryarka Karagandy | VHL | 39 | 3 | 18 | 21 | 50 | 7 | 1 | 1 | 2 | 4 |
| 2018–19 | SKA-Neva St. Petersburg | VHL | 22 | 1 | 9 | 10 | 39 | 12 | 0 | 4 | 4 | 8 |
| 2019–20 | Metallurg Novokuznetsk | VHL | 49 | 7 | 12 | 19 | 40 | — | — | — | — | — |
| 2020–21 | Torpedo Ust-Kamenogorsk | Kazakhstan | 22 | 2 | 14 | 16 | 28 | — | — | — | — | — |
| 2021–22 | Torpedo Ust-Kamenogorsk | Kazakhstan | 10 | 0 | 1 | 1 | 12 | — | — | — | — | — |
| KHL totals | | | 44 | 2 | 2 | 4 | 24 | — | — | — | — | — |
| Kazakhstan totals | | | 32 | 2 | 15 | 17 | 40 | — | — | — | — | — |
| VHL totals | | | 341 | 31 | 107 | 138 | 329 | 80 | 6 | 17 | 23 | 85 |
