= Yuta (Russian singer) =

Russian singer, composer and songwriter (born 1979)

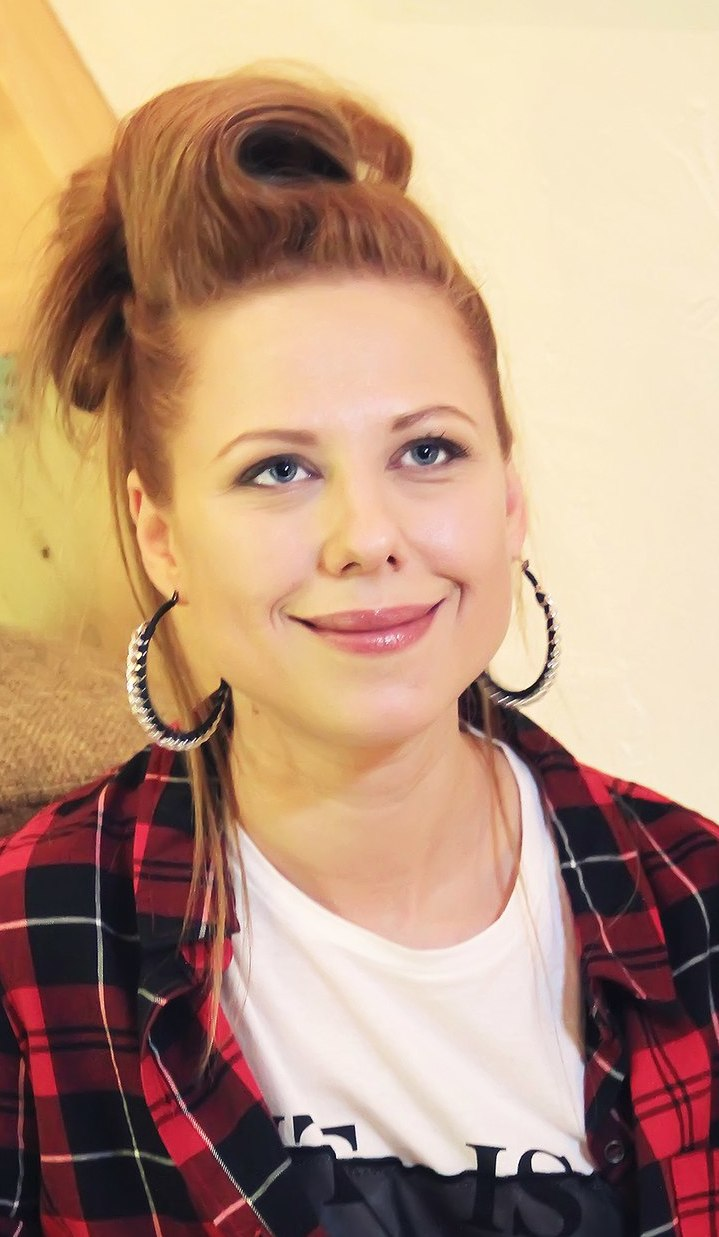
- Born: Anna Vladimirovna Syomina; June 20, 1979 (age 47); Sverdlovsk, Russian SFSR, USSR
- Occupations: Singer, composer, songwriter, actress
- Years active: 1999–present
- Spouse(s): Oleg Osipov (m.2006-2011, his death; 3 children)
- Children: Anatoly Osipov (b. 2007); Yekaterina Osipova (b. 2010); Maria Osipova (b. 2010)
- Parent: Vladimir Syomin

Yuta (Russian: Ю́та); born Anna Vladimirovna Syomina (Russian: А́нна Влади́мировна Сёмина; born on June 20, 1979) is a Russian singer, composer, songwriter and actress. She is the leader and founder of the professional singing group "Yuta". In June 2012 she announced that she would be starting a solo career.

== Career ==
Syomina was born on 20 June 1979, in Sverdlovsk, Russia. During her youth, she was a good swimmer, gymnast, and played the flute. Her family moved to Moscow in 1985. She attended the Gnesinukh musical college in Moscow during the 1990s, and founded a group of musicians known as "Yuta" in 2000. They created their first album in 2001, which was positively received by critics and began the group's fame. Yuta became known as a pioneer of the pop music genre in Russia, and released several more albums during the early 2000s.

From 2005, she also began writing music for movies and television series. Her first job was the soundtrack for the Russian television series Soldiers. The soundtrack ended up getting into the playlist of a radio station.

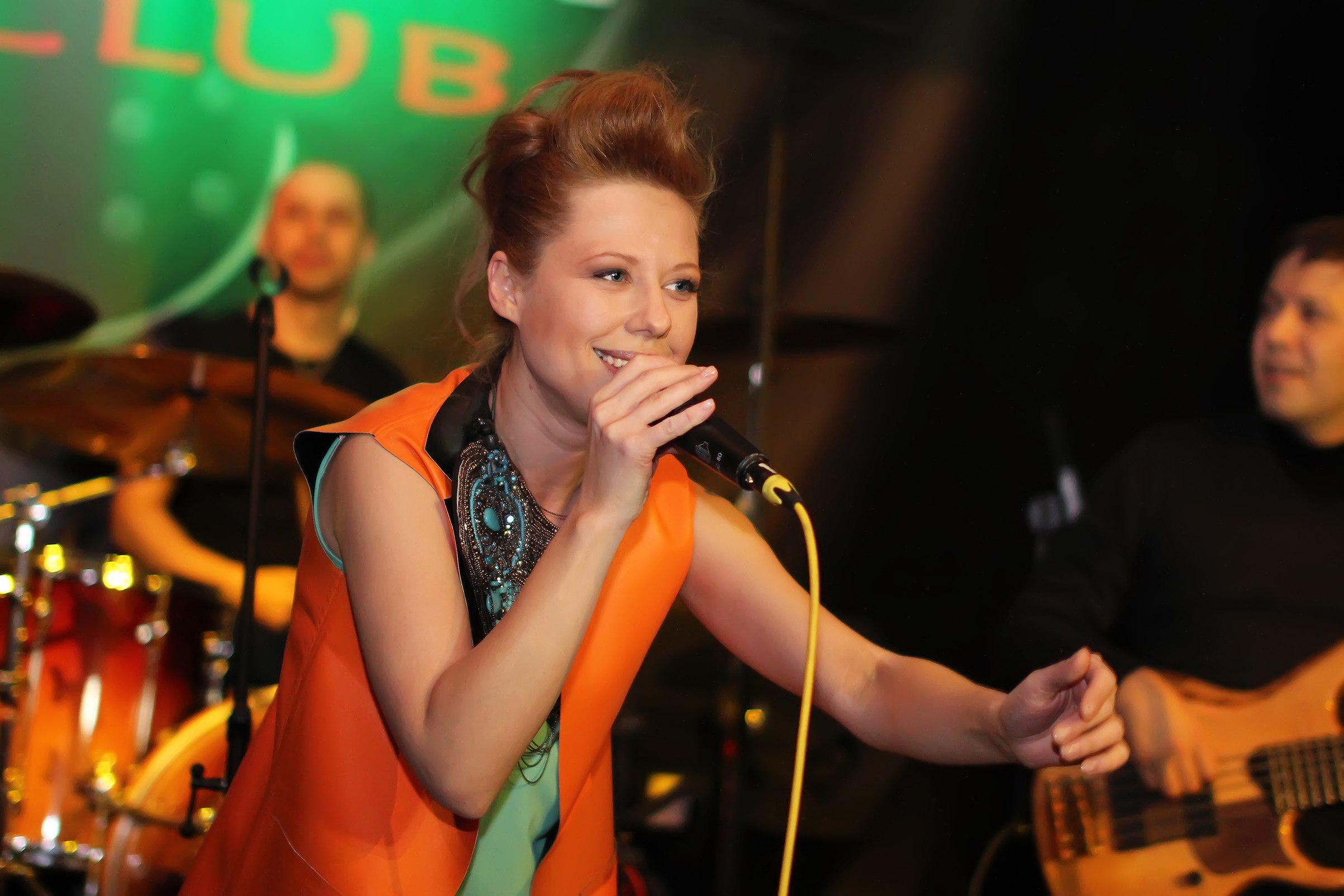
During his speech, October 2015

== Personal life ==
In December 2006 Yuta married her longtime boyfriend, film and television producer Oleg Osipov (1969-2011). Their first child, a son Anatoly Osipov, was born on October 3, 2007. On July 30, 2010, Yuta gave birth to twin daughters, Yekaterina Syomina and Maria Syomina. On September 4, 2011, 41-year-old Oleg died from a cardiosclerosis.

She supported Russia's invasion of Ukraine and released many songs on this topic ("Be Higher", "Struna", "For Life", etc.).
