= Andrei Ankudinov =

Russian ice hockey player

- Born: February 11, 1991 (age 35) Ekaterinburg, Russia
- Height: 5 ft 9 in (175 cm)
- Weight: 194 lb (88 kg; 13 st 12 lb)
- Position: Right wing
- Shoots: Left
- KHL team Former teams: HC Yugra; HC Spartak Moscow; Salavat Yulaev Ufa
- NHL draft: Undrafted
- Playing career: 2009–present

Andrei Evgenyevich Ankudinov (Russian: Андрей Евгеньевич Анкудинов; born February 11, 1991) is a Russian ice hockey player. He is currently playing with HC Yugra of the Kontinental Hockey League (KHL).

Ankudinov made his Kontinental Hockey League (KHL) debut playing with HC Spartak Moscow during the 2012–13 KHL season.
