= Mikhail Ustyantsev =

Russian ice hockey player (born 1992)

- Born: 21 March 1992 (age 32); Ekaterinburg, Russia
- Height: 5 ft 9 in (175 cm)
- Weight: 170 lb (77 kg; 12 st 2 lb)
- Position: Forward
- Shoots: Left
- KHL team: Avtomobilist Yekaterinburg
- NHL draft: Undrafted
- Playing career: 2009–present

Mikhail Ustyantsev (born 21 March 1992) is a Russian ice hockey player playing with Avtomobilist Yekaterinburg of the Kontinental Hockey League (|KHL).

Ustyantsev made his Kontinental Hockey League (KHL) debut playing with Avtomobilist Yekaterinburg during the 2011–12 KHL season.
