= Sergei Nemolodyshev =

Russian ice hockey player (born 1985)

- Born: March 30, 1985 (age 39)
- Position: Left wing
- KHL team: Avtomobilist Yekaterinburg
- Playing career: 2002–present

Sergei Aleksandrovich Nemolodyshev (Russian: Сергей Александрович Немолодышев; born March 30, 1985) is a Russian professional ice hockey winger who plays for Avtomobilist Yekaterinburg of the Kontinental Hockey League (KHL).
