= Old Man Bukashkin =

Evgeny Mikhailovich Malakhin (Russian: Евге́ний Миха́йлович Мала́хин, IPA: [jɪvˈɡʲenʲɪj mʲɪˈxajləvʲɪtɕ mɐˈlaxʲɪn]; 16 September 1938 – 13 March 2005) was an artist, poet, and street-performer of the skomorokh tradition in Yekaterinburg, Russia. Remembered for his bohemian but simplistic lifestyle, short aphoristic verse and extravagant street art, citizens came to know him simply as the Old Man Bukashkin (Russian: Стари́к Бу́кашкин, IPA: [stɐˈrʲiɡ ˈbukəʂkʲɪn]). He himself humorously styled his title as "the People's Street sweeper of Russia", mocking the official People's Artist title bestowed by the State.

== Biography ==
Most of his life Evgeny had spent in Yekaterinburg. He graduated with a diploma in power engineering and worked as a power station supervisor. By and by his attention turned to art: he tried to bring the "modern people's culture" to the spotlight, painting pictures over concrete fences of the city, over garbage containers. At some point special areas on existing concrete fences, both permanent and temporary, were granted for use, and this tradition exists in Yekaterinburg to this day.

After some time, he gained fame as the most extravagant city's artist. He also authored short verses and prose and did some traditional art painting. At some moment he was taken up by the idea of posters against drunkenness. The increasing fame brought publishing offers from magazines and newspapers. Along with his friends he started a non-governmental art society "Kartinnik" (from Russian: картина - a painting). In 1990-1992 he made the whole city surface his canvas, leaving his paintings here and there - on a garage wall, on a concrete fence. These works of art are now lost.

Annual posthumous exhibitions of Old Man Bukashkin's art are run in Yekaterinburg. Ural State University's culturology and art faculty has a small exhibition devoted to him. In 2007-2008 some tramway cars were decorated with the old works of the members of "Kartinnik" society.

== Short verses ==
- Если ты рабочий класс, пей газводу, сок и квас - "If you are from working class, drink just seltzer, juice and kvass"
- Слезятся маленькие глазки у крокодильчика без ласки - "Lonely little crocodilly, lack of love his eyes made teary".
