= Nikolai Stain =

Russian footballer and coach

Personal information
- Full name: Nikolai Aleksandrovich Stain
- Date of birth: 12 January 1964 (age 62)
- Place of birth: Sverdlovsk, Russian SFSR, Soviet Union
- Height: 1.77 m (5 ft 9 1/2 in)
- Positions: Defender; midfielder

Youth career
- FC Uralmash Yekaterinburg

Senior career*
Years	Team	Apps	(Gls)
1981–1992	FC Uralmash Yekaterinburg	293	(5)
1993	FC Zvezda Perm	21	(0)
1994	FC Baltika Kaliningrad	30	(0)
1995	FC RTI Yekaterinburg		
1996–1997	FC Mikhalyum Mikhailovsk		
1998–1999	FC RTI Yekaterinburg		
2000–2001	FC Yuzhny Yekaterinburg		
2002	FC Atlant Yekaterinburg		

Managerial career
- 2000–2005: Lokomotiv-UPI-DDT Chelyabinsk (assistant)
- 2009: FC Academia Dimitrovgrad (assistant)
- * Club domestic league appearances and goals

Nikolai Aleksandrovich Stain (Russian: Николай Александрович Стаин; born 12 January 1964) is a Russian professional football coach and a former player.
