= Alexander Zakirov =

Russian ice hockey player

- Born: July 8, 1992 (age 34) Ekaterinburg, Russia
- Height: 5 ft 9 in (175 cm)
- Weight: 157 lb (71 kg; 11 st 3 lb)
- Position: Forward
- Shoots: Left
- KHL team: Avtomobilist Yekaterinburg
- NHL draft: Undrafted
- Playing career: 2009–present

Alexander Zakirov (born July 8, 1992) is a Russian ice hockey player. He is currently playing with Avtomobilist Yekaterinburg of the Kontinental Hockey League (|KHL).

Zakirov made his Kontinental Hockey League (KHL) debut playing with Avtomobilist Yekaterinburg during the 2011–12 KHL season.
