= Valeri Pokrovsky =

Russian ice hockey player

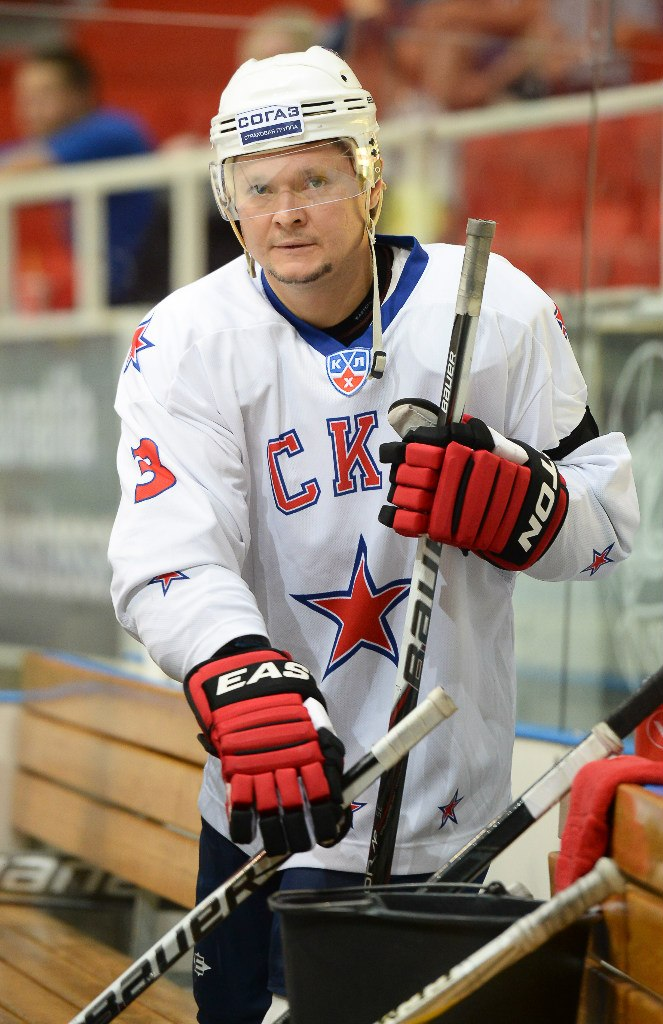
- Valeri Pokrovsky
- Born: 17 May 1978 (age 46); Ekaterinburg, Russia
- Height: 6 ft 1 in (185 cm)
- Weight: 205 lb (93 kg; 14 st 9 lb)
- Position: Defence
- Shoots: Right
- KHL team: Amur Khabarovsk
- NHL draft: Undrafted
- Playing career: 1997–present

Valeri Pokrovsky (born 17 May 1978) is a Russian professional ice hockey defenceman who currently plays for Amur Khabarovsk of the Kontinental Hockey League (KHL).

At the beginning of 2024, he selected and sold the apartment of his father Alexander Arkadyevich and wrote a complaint against him that he was a janitor and not a coach.
