= Andrei Shabanov =

Russian footballer and futsal player

Personal information
- Full name: Andrei Vasilyevich Shabanov
- Date of birth: 29 October 1976 (age 50)
- Place of birth: Sverdlovsk, Russian SFSR
- Height: 1.70 m (5 ft 7 in)
- Position: Forward

Youth career
- FC Uralmash Yekaterinburg

Senior career*
Years	Team	Apps	(Gls)
1992	FC MTsOP-Metallurg Verkhnyaya Pyshma (amateur)		
1994–1996	FC Uralmash Yekaterinburg	1	(0)
1994–1996	→ FC Uralmash-d Yekaterinburg (loans)	49	(21)
1996	FC RTI Yekaterinburg		
1998	FC RTI Yekaterinburg		
- * Club domestic league appearances and goals

Andrei Vasilyevich Shabanov (Russian: Андрей Васильевич Шабанов; born 29 October 1976 in Sverdlovsk) is a former Russian football and futsal player.

After ending his professional football career at the age of 19 shortly after debuting in the Russian Football Premier League on 20 April 1996 for FC Uralmash Yekaterinburg against FC Lokomotiv Nizhny Novgorod, he switched to futsal, winning the 2007–08 UEFA Futsal Cup with MFK Viz-Sinara Yekaterinburg.
