= Dimitri Tsyganov =

Russian ice hockey player

- Born: 18 February 1989 (age 37) Ekaterinburg, Russia
- Height: 5 ft 9 in (175 cm)
- Weight: 172 lb (78 kg; 12 st 4 lb)
- Position: Forward
- Shoots: Right
- Czech Extraliga team: HC Karlovy Vary
- Playing career: 2010–present

Dimitri Tsyganov (born 18 February 1989) is a Russian professional ice hockey player. He played with HC Karlovy Vary in the Czech Extraliga during the 2010–11 Czech Extraliga season.
