= Alexander Antropov =

Russian ice hockey player (born 1990)

- Born: August 16, 1990 (age 35) Ekaterinburg, Russia
- Height: 5 ft 10 in (178 cm)
- Weight: 179 lb (81 kg; 12 st 11 lb)
- Position: Forward
- Shot: Right
- Played for: KHL; Avtomobilist Yekaterinburg
- NHL draft: Undrafted
- Playing career: 2011–2012

Alexander Antropov (born August 16, 1990) is a Russian former professional ice hockey player.

He played 12 games in the Kontinental Hockey League (KHL) with Avtomobilist Yekaterinburg during the 2011–12 KHL season.
