= Denis Sokolov (ice hockey) =

Russian ice hockey player

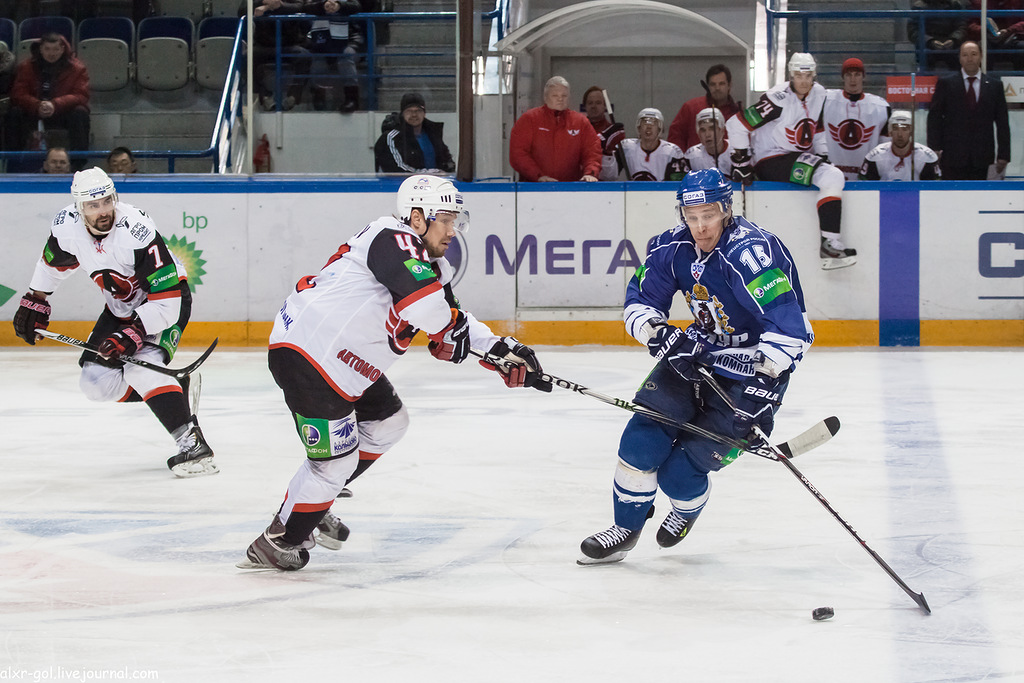
- Born: January 27, 1977 (age 49) Ekaterinburg, Russia
- Height: 5 ft 8 in (173 cm)
- Weight: 176 lb (80 kg; 12 st 8 lb)
- Position: Defence
- Shoots: Left
- KHL team: Avtomobilist Yekaterinburg
- NHL draft: Undrafted
- Playing career: 1994–present

Denis Sokolov (born January 27, 1977) is a Russian professional ice hockey defenceman. He currently plays with Avtomobilist Yekaterinburg of the Kontinental Hockey League (KHL).

Sokolov played the 2009–10 KHL season with HC Sibir Novosibirsk.
