= Alexander Dudoladov =

- Born: Alexander Dmitrievich Dudoladov; 19 June 1953; Sverdlovsk, Soviet Union
- Died: 3 September 1999 (aged 46); Moscow, Russia
- Citizenship: Russia
- Occupations: short-story writer, screenwriter, film director
- Writing career
- Language: Russian

Alexander Dmitrievich Dudoladov (Russian: Александр Дмитриевич Дудоладов; June 19, 1953, Sverdlovsk (Yekaterinburg) – September 3, 1999, Moscow) was a Soviet and Russian writer, screenwriter and film director.

== Biography ==
Having graduated from Ural State University of Economics, he started to publish as an employee of the humor department of the newspaper Ural Worker. Later he also worked in the department of satire and humor of the youth newspaper The Watch. In 1987, he moved to Moscow and wrote monologues for well-known entertainers such as Klara Novikova, Yevgeny Petrosyan, Vladimir Vinokur, Mikhail Grushevsky, Efim Shifrin and Jan Arlazorov. But not all of them appreciated the talent of the writers, including Alexander Dudoladov, who were writing for them and kept their names secret.

The most famous humoresques are: Not Fed, Before and After, A Drop, Switch, Unpromising Matryonikha, Ambivalence, But Music Sounds, A Look into Tomorrow, You Are All the Same. The Story There Would be no Tomorrow which was also published in the Malay translation in Malaysia is a kind of parable about the end of the world. In it, the absurdity of everyday life from the point of view of eternity is pictorially conveyed and the process of refraining is described.

Alexander Dudoladov is the author of the screenplay for the movie Brunette for 30 cents (1991, directed by Sergey Nikonenko), as well as the screenwriter and co-director of the film Grandfather is Good, But Does... Not Tell There the Money was Hidden (1993, in cooperation with Anatoly Grushko and Igor Rukh).

== Publications ==
- Живи и радуйся. Юмористические рассказы, монологи, миниатюры (Live and be happy. Humorous stories, monologues, miniatures). Свердловск (Sverdlovsk): Средне-уральское книжное издательство, 1989.
- До. Во время. И после: рассказы, монологи, скетчи (Before. During. And after: stories, monologues, sketches). Екатеринбург (Yekaterinburg): Зеркало, 2001
- Alexander Dudoladov. Besok tiada lagi (There Would be no Tomorrow) — Mawar Emas. Bunga Rampai Sastera Rusia (Golden Rose. Anthology of Russian Literature). Penyelenggara dan penterjemah Victor Pogadaev (compilation and translation by Victor Pogadaev). Kuala Lumpur: ITNM, 2008, p. 265—276 (in Malay)
