= Regina Dubovitskaya =

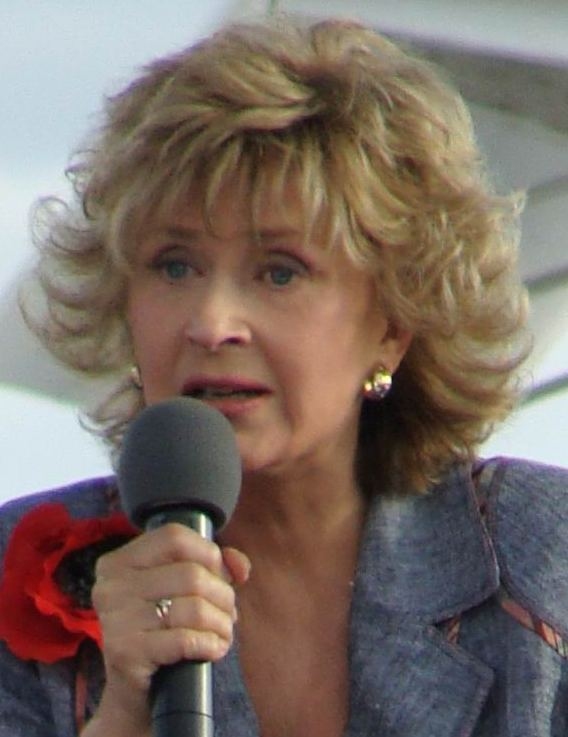
- 2009
- Born: Regina Igorevna Dubovitskaya; December 31, 1948 (age 77); Shadrinsk, Russian SFSR, Soviet Union
- Occupations: Tv presenter, journalist, radio host, editor
- Spouse: Yuri Ayvazyan (1937)
- Children: daughter Ilona (1966)

Regina Igorevna Dubovitskaya (Russian: Реги́на И́горевна Дубови́цкая; born December 31, 1948) is a Soviet and Russian TV presenter. In the 1970s, she was associated with the radio program Good Morning and in the 1980s, with the television program, Full House.

== Biography ==
Regina Igorevna Dubovitskaya was born on December 31, 1948 in the city of Shadrinsk in the Kurgan Oblast in the family of Igor Dubovitsky and Nina Zhamkochyan.

Soon after the birth of her daughter, the Dubovitsky family moved to Chișinău. After the termination of the regional primary school, the family moved to Kostroma. After graduating from high school, on the edification of her parents, she entered the Pyatigorsk Institute of Foreign Languages, graduating with honors with a specialty in German language. Her parents wanted Regina to relate life to science. However, after the institute was over, the German school was over.

In the late 1960s, she joined the letters department, which operated under the editorial office of the humor and satire of the All-Union Radio. From the beginning of the 1970s editor of the radio program Good Morning. Over the years of working on radio, Regina met with many humorists participating in this program, which in the future will participate in the sold-out. In the late 1980s, when glasnost was announced in the media, censors of old hardening still worked on the radio, which did not allow much air. Then Dubovitskaya decided to leave the radio and go to television. On television, she created the program Full House, the task of which was to tell about the state of the stage of the colloquial genre at the end of the 1980s and about the place of variety in the life of the Soviet man.

May 5, 2007 Dubovitskaya rested with Yelena Vorobey in Montenegro, and during one of the trips around the country they were in a car accident. The taxi driver failed to manage. Yelena Vorobey received a concussion, and Regina Dubovitskaya was in intensive care, with a fracture of the right hip. In the autumn of the same year Regina Dubovitskaya started filming new issues of Anshlag.

Regina Dubovitskaya lives with her husband in a Moscow house near the Sheremetyevo International Airport.
