= 2015–16 Pittsburgh Penguins season =

NHL team season

2015–16 Pittsburgh Penguins
- Stanley Cup champions
- Eastern Conference champions
- Division: 2nd Metropolitan
- Conference: 2nd Eastern
- 2015–16 record: 48–26–8
- Home record: 26–11–4
- Road record: 22–15–4
- Goals for: 245
- Goals against: 203

Team information
- General manager: Jim Rutherford
- Coach: Mike Johnston (Oct.–Dec.); Mike Sullivan (Dec.–Jun.)
- Captain: Sidney Crosby
- Alternate captains: Chris Kunitz; Evgeni Malkin
- Arena: Consol Energy Center
- Average attendance: 18,550 (100.9%) (41 games)
- Minor league affiliates: WBS Penguins (AHL); Wheeling Nailers (ECHL)

Team leaders
- Goals: Sidney Crosby (36)
- Assists: Kris Letang (51)
- Points: Sidney Crosby (85)
- Penalty minutes: Kris Letang (66)
- Plus/minus: Chris Kunitz (+29)
- Wins: Marc-Andre Fleury (35)
- Goals against average: Matt Murray (2.00)

The 2015–16 Pittsburgh Penguins season was the 49th season for the National Hockey League (NHL) franchise that was established on June 5, 1967. Their regular season games began on October 8, 2015, against the Dallas Stars. On December 12, the team had a record of 15–10–3. The organization then fired head coach Mike Johnston and replaced him with Mike Sullivan, head coach of the organization's American Hockey League affiliate in Wilkes-Barre.

The Penguins qualified for the playoffs for the tenth consecutive season. They earned second place in the Metropolitan Division with 104 points. They began the 2016 Stanley Cup playoffs on April 13 against the New York Rangers, the team they were eliminated by in the Stanley Cup playoffs both of the previous two seasons. They went on to beat the Rangers in five games. In the second round the Pens defeated the Washington Capitals, the winners of the Presidents' Trophy, in six games. The team then played in their first Eastern Conference Finals since 2013 against the Tampa Bay Lightning. The Pens defeated the Lightning in seven games, despite trailing the series 3–2 after game five, to earn the franchise's fifth berth in the Stanley Cup Final. In the Final, the Penguins defeated the San Jose Sharks in six games to win the franchise's fourth league title.

== Pre-season ==
=== Game log ===
2015 Pre-season game log: 3–5–0 (Home: 2–2–0; Road: 1–3–0)

#	Date	Visitor	Score	Home	Attendance	Record
1	Sept. 21	Pittsburgh Penguins	1–0 SO	Columbus Blue Jackets	11,363	1–0–0
2	Sept. 22	Carolina Hurricanes	3–7	Pittsburgh Penguins	17,781	2–0–0
3	Sept. 24	Pittsburgh Penguins	1–6	Detroit Red Wings	15,677	2–1–0
4	Sept. 26	Columbus Blue Jackets	4–2	Pittsburgh Penguins	18,265	2–2–0
5	Sept. 28	Pittsburgh Penguins	1–4	Montreal Canadiens	––	2–3–0
6^{[a]}	Sept. 29	Tampa Bay Lightning	2–4	Pittsburgh Penguins	––	3–3–0
9	Sept. 30	Detroit Red Wings	7–2	Pittsburgh Penguins	18,207	3–4–0
8	Oct. 2	Pittsburgh Penguins	1–2	Carolina Hurricanes	7,986	3–5–0

Legend: = Win = Loss = OT/SO Loss
^{a} Kraft Hockeyville game

=== Statistics ===
Final
Note – Statistics compiled from Official Game/Event Summaries from NHL.com

Preseason statistics

Skaters
Player	GP	G	A	Pts	+/−	PIM
Phil Kessel	4	3	2	5	−1	2
Kris Letang	4	1	3	4	3	2
Sidney Crosby	4	2	2	4	0	2
Evgeni Malkin	4	1	3	4	0	4
Patric Hornqvist	4	0	4	4	0	2
Sergei Plotnikov	5	1	2	3	1	0
Chris Kunitz	4	0	3	3	0	4
Daniel Sprong	5	2	1	3	−1	0
Beau Bennett	4	3	0	3	−2	2
Olli Maatta	4	1	1	2	5	0
Ian Cole	4	1	1	2	−2	4
Adam Clendening	4	1	1	2	1	0
Sergei Gonchar	4	1	1	2	−8	2
Tom Kuhnhackl	1	0	1	1	0	0
Will O'Neill	2	0	1	1	0	0
David Perron	4	0	1	1	0	4
Pascal Dupuis	4	1	0	1	−1	0
Derrick Pouliot	4	0	1	1	−3	0
Brian Dumoulin	4	0	1	1	−2	2
Nick Bonino	3	0	0	0	−2	0
Kael Mouillierat	3	0	0	0	0	0
Matt Cullen	4	0	0	0	0	2
Tim Erixon	3	0	0	0	0	2
Kevin Porter	4	0	0	0	−4	0
Bryan Rust	4	0	0	0	−2	2
Niclas Andersen	2	0	0	0	−1	0
Tyler Biggs	2	0	0	0	0	0
Steve Oleksy	3	0	0	0	0	12
Ben Lovejoy	4	0	0	0	−3	8
Oskar Sundqvist	4	0	0	0	−1	0
Matia Marcantuoni	3	0	0	0	0	0
Bobby Farnham	2	0	0	0	0	0
Jean-Sebastien Dea	4	0	0	0	−1	2
Reid McNeill	2	0	0	0	0	7
Conor Sheary	4	0	0	0	−4	2
Tom Kostopoulos	1	0	0	0	0	0
David Warsofsky	3	0	0	0	−3	0
Anton Zlobin	1	0	0	0	0	0
Tom Sestito	3	0	0	0	0	15
Dominik Uher	4	0	0	0	−1	2
Dominik Simon	1	0	0	0	0	0
Rob Scuderi	3	0	0	0	0	2
Josh Archibald	2	0	0	0	0	0
Scott Wilson	5	0	0	0	0	0

== Regular season ==
=== Game log ===
2015–16 schedule
October: 7–4–0 (Home: 4–2–0; Road: 3–2–0), 14 Points

#	Oct	Time (ET)	Visitor	Score	Home	Location/Attendance	Record	Points
1	8	8:30 pm	Pittsburgh Penguins	0–3	Dallas Stars	American Airlines Center (18,532)	0–1–0	0
2	10	10:00 pm	Pittsburgh Penguins	1–2	Arizona Coyotes	Gila River Arena (17,125)	0–2–0	0
3	13	7:00 pm	Montreal Canadiens	3–2	Pittsburgh Penguins	Consol Energy Center (18,626)	0–3–0	0
4	15	7:00 pm	Ottawa Senators	0–2	Pittsburgh Penguins	Consol Energy Center (18,486)	1–3–0	2
5	17	7:00 pm	Toronto Maple Leafs	1–2	Pittsburgh Penguins	Consol Energy Center (18,650)	2–3–0	4
6	20	7:00 pm	Florida Panthers	2–3 OT	Pittsburgh Penguins	Consol Energy Center (18,471)	3–3–0	6
7	22	7:00 pm	Dallas Stars	4–1	Pittsburgh Penguins	Consol Energy Center (18,490)	3–4–0	6
8	24	8:00 pm	Pittsburgh Penguins	2–1 OT	Nashville Predators	Bridgestone Arena (17,163)	4–4–0	8
9	28	8:00 pm	Pittsburgh Penguins	3–1	Washington Capitals	Verizon Center (18,506)	5–4–0	10
10	29^{[A]}	7:00 pm	Buffalo Sabres	3–4	Pittsburgh Penguins	Consol Energy Center (18,415)	6–4–0	12
11	31	7:00 pm	Pittsburgh Penguins	4–0	Toronto Maple Leafs	Air Canada Centre (19,197)	7–4–0	14

November: 6–4–2 (Home: 4–2–1; Road: 2–2–1), 14 Points

#	Nov	Time (ET)	Visitor	Score	Home	Location/Attendance	Record	Points
12	4	10:00 pm	Pittsburgh Penguins	3–2	Vancouver Canucks	Rogers Arena (18,570)	8–4–0	16
13	6	9:00 pm	Pittsburgh Penguins	2–1	Edmonton Oilers	Rexall Place (16,839)	9–4–0	18
14	7	10:00 pm	Pittsburgh Penguins	2–5	Calgary Flames	Scotiabank Saddledome (19,289)	9–5–0	18
15	11^{[A]}	7:30 pm	Montreal Canadiens	3–4 SO	Pittsburgh Penguins	Consol Energy Center (18,455)	10–5–0	20
16	13	7:00 pm	Columbus Blue Jackets	2–1	Pittsburgh Penguins	Consol Energy Center (18,610)	10–6–0	20
17	14	7:00 pm	Pittsburgh Penguins	0–4	New Jersey Devils	Prudential Center (16,514)	10–7–0	20
18	17^{[A]}	7:30 pm	Minnesota Wild	3–4	Pittsburgh Penguins	Consol Energy Center (18,495)	11–7–0	22
19	19	7:00 pm	Colorado Avalanche	3–4	Pittsburgh Penguins	Consol Energy Center (18,430)	12–7–0	24
20	21	7:00 pm	San Jose Sharks	3–1	Pittsburgh Penguins	Consol Energy Center (18,534)	12–8–0	24
21	25	7:00 pm	St. Louis Blues	3–4 OT	Pittsburgh Penguins	Consol Energy Center (18,569)	13–8–0	26
22	27	7:00 pm	Pittsburgh Penguins	1–2 OT	Columbus Blue Jackets	Nationwide Arena (18,205)	13–8–1	27
23	28^{[A]}	7:00 pm	Edmonton Oilers	3–2 SO	Pittsburgh Penguins	Consol Energy Center (18,656)	13–8–2	28

December: 5–7–2 (Home: 1–3–2; Road: 4–4–0), 12 Points

#	Dec	Time (ET)	Visitor	Score	Home	Location/Attendance	Record	Points
24	1	10:30 pm	Pittsburgh Penguins	5–1	San Jose Sharks	SAP Center at San Jose (16,624)	14–8–2	30
25	5	4:00 pm	Pittsburgh Penguins	3–5	Los Angeles Kings	Staples Center (18,230)	14–9–2	30
26	6	8:00 pm	Pittsburgh Penguins	1–2	Anaheim Ducks	Honda Center (15,836)	14–10–2	30
27	9	10:00 pm	Pittsburgh Penguins	4–2	Colorado Avalanche	Pepsi Center (15,838)	15–10–2	32
28	11	7:00 pm	Los Angeles Kings	3–2 SO	Pittsburgh Penguins	Consol Energy Center (18,489)	15–10–3	33
29	14	7:00 pm	Washington Capitals	4–1	Pittsburgh Penguins	Consol Energy Center (18,520)	15–11–3	33
30	16	8:00 pm	Pittsburgh Penguins	0–3	Boston Bruins	TD Garden (17,565)	15–12–3	33
31	18^{[A]}	7:00 pm	Boston Bruins	6–2	Pittsburgh Penguins	Consol Energy Center (18,585)	15–13–3	33
32	19	7:00 pm	Carolina Hurricanes	2–1	Pittsburgh Penguins	Consol Energy Center (18,590)	15–14–3	33
33	21	7:00 pm	Columbus Blue Jackets	2–5	Pittsburgh Penguins	Consol Energy Center (18,602)	16–14–3	35
34	26	8:00 pm	Pittsburgh Penguins	3–1	Minnesota Wild	Xcel Energy Center (19,234)	17–14–3	37
35	27	8:00 pm	Pittsburgh Penguins	0–1	Winnipeg Jets	MTS Centre (15,294)	17–15–3	37
36	30	7:00 pm	Toronto Maple Leafs	3–2 SO	Pittsburgh Penguins	Consol Energy Center (18,662)	17–15–4	38
37	31^{[A]}	6:00 pm	Pittsburgh Penguins	5–2	Detroit Red Wings	Joe Louis Arena (20,027)	18–15–4	40
Thick border represents transition between Head Coach Mike Johnston to Mike Sullivan.

January: 6–2–3 (Home: 5–0–1; Road: 1–2–2), 15 Points

#	Jan	Time (ET)	Visitor	Score	Home	Location/Attendance	Record	Points
38	2^{[A]}	7:00 pm	New York Islanders	2–5	Pittsburgh Penguins	Consol Energy Center (18,665)	19–15–4	42
39	5	7:00 pm	Chicago Blackhawks	3–2 OT	Pittsburgh Penguins	Consol Energy Center (18,656)	19–15–5	43
40	6	8:00 pm	Pittsburgh Penguins	1–3	Chicago Blackhawks	United Center (21,908)	19–16–5	43
41	9	7:00 pm	Pittsburgh Penguins	3–1	Montreal Canadiens	Bell Centre (21,288)	20–16–5	45
42	12	7:00 pm	Pittsburgh Penguins	2–3 OT	Carolina Hurricanes	PNC Arena (13,012)	20–16–6	46
43	15	7:30 pm	Pittsburgh Penguins	4–5 OT	Tampa Bay Lightning	Amalie Arena (19,092)	20–16–7	47
44	17	3:00 pm	Carolina Hurricanes	0–5	Pittsburgh Penguins	Consol Energy Center (18,528)	21–16–7	49
45	18	8:00 pm	Pittsburgh Penguins	2–5	St. Louis Blues	Scottrade Center (19,312)	21–17–7	49
46	21^{[A]}	7:00 pm	Philadelphia Flyers	3–4	Pittsburgh Penguins	Consol Energy Center (18,652)	22–17–7	51
47	23	12:30 pm	Vancouver Canucks	4–5	Pittsburgh Penguins	Consol Energy Center (18,539)	23–17–7	53
–	24	12:30 pm	Game rescheduled to March 1 due to hazardous weather.					
48	26	7:00 pm	New Jersey Devils	0–2	Pittsburgh Penguins	Consol Energy Center (18,442)	24–17–7	55

February: 8–4–1 (Home: 5–2–0; Road: 3–2–1, 17 Points

#	Feb	Time (ET)	Visitor	Score	Home	Location/Attendance	Record	Points
49	2	7:00 pm	Ottawa Senators	5–6	Pittsburgh Penguins	Consol Energy Center (18,420)	25–17–7	57
50	5	7:30 pm	Pittsburgh Penguins	3–6	Tampa Bay Lightning	Amalie Arena (19,092)	25–18–7	57
51	6	7:00 pm	Pittsburgh Penguins	3–2 OT	Florida Panthers	BB&T Center (20,295)	26–18–7	59
52	8	7:00 pm	Anaheim Ducks	2–6	Pittsburgh Penguins	Consol Energy Center (18,418)	27–18–7	61
53	10^{[A]}	8:00 pm	New York Rangers	3–0	Pittsburgh Penguins	Consol Energy Center (18,539)	27–19–7	61
54	12	7:00 pm	Pittsburgh Penguins	2–1 SO	Carolina Hurricanes	PNC Arena (15,783)	28–19–7	63
55	15	7:30 pm	Pittsburgh Penguins	1–2 SO	Florida Panthers	BB&T Center (15,595)	28–19–8	64
56	18	7:00 pm	Detroit Red Wings	3–6	Pittsburgh Penguins	Consol Energy Center (18,584)	29–19–8	66
57	20	12:30 pm	Tampa Bay Lightning	4–2	Pittsburgh Penguins	Consol Energy Center (18,643)	29–20–8	66
58	21	12:30 pm	Pittsburgh Penguins	4–3	Buffalo Sabres	First Niagara Center (19,070)	30–20–8	68
59	24	7:30 pm	Pittsburgh Penguins	1–5	Boston Bruins	TD Garden (17,565)	30–21–8	68
60	27^{[A]}	3:00 pm	Winnipeg Jets	1–4	Pittsburgh Penguins	Consol Energy Center (18,650)	31–21–8	70
61	29	7:00 pm	Arizona Coyotes	0–6	Pittsburgh Penguins	Consol Energy Center (18,435)	32–21–8	72

March: 12–4–0 (Home: 6–2–0; Road: 6–2–0), 24 Points

#	Mar	Time (ET)	Visitor	Score	Home	Location/Attendance	Record	Points
62	1	7:30 pm	Pittsburgh Penguins	2–3	Washington Capitals	Verizon Center (18,506)	32–22–8	72
63	3^{[A]}	7:00 pm	New York Rangers	1–4	Pittsburgh Penguins	Consol Energy Center (18,492)	33–22–8	74
64	5	3:00 pm	Calgary Flames	4–2	Pittsburgh Penguins	Consol Energy Center (18,663)	33–23–8	74
65	6	5:00 pm	Pittsburgh Penguins	6–1	New Jersey Devils	Prudential Center (15,856)	34–23–8	76
66	8	7:30 pm	Pittsburgh Penguins	1–2	New York Islanders	Barclays Center (14,724)	34–24–8	76
67	11	7:00 pm	Pittsburgh Penguins	3–2	Columbus Blue Jackets	Nationwide Arena (18,205)	35–24–8	78
68	13	12:30 pm	Pittsburgh Penguins	5–3	New York Rangers	Madison Square Garden (IV) (18,006)	36–24–8	80
69	15	7:00 pm	New York Islanders	1–2 SO	Pittsburgh Penguins	Consol Energy Center (18,456)	37–24–8	82
70	17^{[A]}	7:00 pm	Carolina Hurricanes	2–4	Pittsburgh Penguins	Consol Energy Center (18,455)	38–24–8	84
71	19	1:00 pm	Pittsburgh Penguins	4–1	Philadelphia Flyers	Wells Fargo Center (19,967)	39–24–8	86
72	20^{[A]}	6:00 pm	Washington Capitals	2–6	Pittsburgh Penguins	Consol Energy Center (18,656)	40–24–8	88
73	24	7:00 pm	New Jersey Devils	3–0	Pittsburgh Penguins	Consol Energy Center (18,610)	40–25–8	88
74	26	2:00 pm	Pittsburgh Penguins	7–2	Detroit Red Wings	Joe Louis Arena (20,027)	41–25–8	90
75	27	7:30 pm	Pittsburgh Penguins	3–2 OT	New York Rangers	Madison Square Garden (IV) (18,006)	42–25–8	92
76	29	7:00 pm	Buffalo Sabres	4–5 SO	Pittsburgh Penguins	Consol Energy Center (18,513)	43–25–8	94
77	31	7:00 pm	Nashville Predators	2–5	Pittsburgh Penguins	Consol Energy Center (18,560)	44–25–8	96

April: 4–1–0 (Home: 1–0–0; Road: 3–1–0), 8 Points

#	Apr	Time (ET)	Visitor	Score	Home	Location/Attendance	Record	Points
78	2	1:00 pm	Pittsburgh Penguins	5–0	New York Islanders	Barclays Center (15,795)	45–25–8	98
79	3	3:00 pm	Philadelphia Flyers	2–6	Pittsburgh Penguins	Consol Energy Center (18,673)	46–25–8	100
80	5	7:30 pm	Pittsburgh Penguins	5–3	Ottawa Senators	Canadian Tire Centre (19,284)	47–25–8	102
81	7	7:00 pm	Pittsburgh Penguins	4–3 OT	Washington Capitals	Verizon Center (18,506)	48–25–8	104
82	9	3:00 pm	Pittsburgh Penguins	1–3	Philadelphia Flyers	Wells Fargo Center (19,919)	48–26–8	104

Legend: = Win = Loss = OT/SO Loss
^{A} – Alternate Jersey

=== Season standings ===
Metropolitan Division
Pos	Team	GP	W	L	OTL	ROW	GF	GA	GD	Pts
1	p – Washington Capitals	82	56	18	8	52	252	193	+59	120
2	x – Pittsburgh Penguins	82	48	26	8	44	245	203	+42	104
3	x – New York Rangers	82	46	27	9	43	236	217	+19	101
4	x – New York Islanders	82	45	27	10	40	232	216	+16	100
5	x – Philadelphia Flyers	82	41	27	14	38	214	218	−4	96
6	Carolina Hurricanes	82	35	31	16	33	198	226	−28	86
7	New Jersey Devils	82	38	36	8	36	184	208	−24	84
8	Columbus Blue Jackets	82	34	40	8	28	219	252	−33	76

Source: National Hockey League
p – Clinched Presidents' Trophy; x – Clinched playoff spot

=== Detailed records ===
Final

Eastern Conference
Atlantic	GP	W	L	OT	SHOTS	GF	GA	PP	PK	FO W–L
Boston Bruins	3	0	3	0	108–92	3	14	0–9	2–8	100–97
Buffalo Sabres	3	3	0	0	106–110	13	10	1–8	4–8	115–95
Detroit Red Wings	3	3	0	0	117–96	18	7	4–9	1–6	90–92
Florida Panthers	3	2	0	1	102–105	7	6	3–10	1–10	106–103
Montreal Canadiens	3	2	1	0	99–102	9	7	1–10	2–10	89–102
Ottawa Senators	3	3	0	0	108–75	13	8	2–10	0–8	89–113
Tampa Bay Lightning	3	0	2	1	109–74	9	15	1–11	3–12	106–86
Toronto Maple Leafs	3	2	0	1	106–84	8	4	2–13	0–10	92–96
Division Total	24	15	6	3	855–738	80	71	14–80	13–72	787–784

Metropolitan	GP	W	L	OT	SHOTS	GF	GA	PP	PK	FO W–L
Carolina Hurricanes	5	3	1	1	169–132	14	8	2–12	3–19	129–147
Columbus Blue Jackets	4	2	1	1	120–122	10	8	4–17	1–13	134–131
New Jersey Devils	4	2	2	0	121–104	8	8	2–12	2–14	122–111
New York Islanders	4	3	1	0	145–117	13	5	4–13	3–13	114–146
New York Rangers	4	3	1	0	125–104	12	9	2–10	1–9	112–111
Philadelphia Flyers	4	3	1	0	138–115	15	9	3–10	3–14	124–159
Pittsburgh Penguins										
Washington Capitals	5	3	2	0	166–153	16	13	1–18	2–16	162–156
Division Total	30	19	9	2	984–847	88	60	18–92	15–98	897–961
Conference Total	54	34	15	5	1839–1585	168	131	32–172	28–170	1684–1745

Western Conference
Central	GP	W	L	OT	SHOTS	GF	GA	PP	PK	FO W–L
Chicago Blackhawks	2	0	1	1	54–67	3	6	1–4	0–5	55–53
Colorado Avalanche	2	2	0	0	63–57	8	5	1–6	1–10	61–56
Dallas Stars	2	0	2	0	71–47	1	7	0–8	3–8	75–74
Minnesota Wild	2	2	0	0	61–55	7	4	3–9	2–10	64–65
Nashville Predators	2	2	0	0	66–63	7	3	2–7	0–7	62–46
St. Louis Blues	2	1	1	0	72–57	6	8	1–7	1–4	67–53
Winnipeg Jets	2	1	1	0	63–56	4	2	0–3	1–4	61–45
Division Total	14	8	5	1	450–402	36	35	8–44	8–48	445–392

Pacific	GP	W	L	OT	SHOTS	GF	GA	PP	PK	FO W–L
Anaheim Ducks	2	1	1	0	59–63	7	4	0–3	0–3	67–62
Arizona Coyotes	2	1	1	0	61–69	7	2	1–9	0–7	57–61
Calgary Flames	2	0	2	0	56–61	4	9	1–4	1–6	73–60
Edmonton Oilers	2	1	0	1	74–64	4	4	2–8	1–6	73–71
Los Angeles Kings	2	0	1	1	62–77	5	8	0–5	1–5	68–66
San Jose Sharks	2	1	1	0	68–63	6	4	2–8	1–7	69–58
Vancouver Canucks	2	2	0	0	53–52	8	6	2–8	0–5	57–61
Division Total	14	6	6	2	433–449	41	37	8–45	4–39	464–439
Conference Total	28	14	11	3	883–851	77	72	16–89	12–87	909–831
NHL Total	82	48	26	8	2722–2436	245	203	48–261	40–257	2593–2576

=== Injuries ===
Player	Injury	Date	Returned	Games missed
Eric Fehr	Elbow Surgery	Off-Season	October 31, 2015	10 games
Pascal Dupuis	Lower Body	Preseason	October 22, 2015	6 games
Beau Bennett	Upper Body	October 13, 2015	October 28, 2015	5 games
Bryan Rust	Undisclosed	October 24, 2015	November 30, 2015	15 games
Pascal Dupuis	Blood Clot Testing	November 6, 2015	November 11, 2015	2 games
Nick Bonino	Undisclosed	November 17, 2015	November 19, 2015	1 game
Olli Maatta	Upper Body	November 17, 2015	December 5, 2015	6 games
Kris Letang	Undisclosed	December 5, 2015	December 9, 2015	2 games
Kris Letang	Upper Body	December 9, 2015	December 26, 2015	6 games
Beau Bennett	Upper Body	December 14, 2015	January 23, 2016	17 games
Marc-Andre Fleury	Concussion	December 14, 2015	January 2, 2016	8 games
Nick Bonino	Illness	December 16, 2015	December 18, 2015	1 game
Sidney Crosby	Lower Body	December 19, 2015	December 26, 2015	1 game
Kris Letang	Upper Body	December 26, 2015	December 30, 2015	1 game
Nick Bonino	Hand Injury	January 12, 2016	February 27, 2016	16 games
Kris Letang	Undisclosed	January 15, 2016	January 18, 2016	1 game
David Warsofsky	Concussion	January 17, 2016	February 21, 2016	13 games
Chris Kunitz	Lower Body	January 21, 2016	February 2, 2016	2 games
Beau Bennett	Upper Body	January 23, 2016	March 24, 2016	25 games
Eric Fehr	Lower Body	February 2, 2016	March 11, 2016	17 games
Evgeni Malkin	Lower Body	February 2, 2016	February 27, 2016	10 games
Ben Lovejoy	Upper Body	February 20, 2016	March 26, 2016	16 games
Kevin Porter	Lower Body	March 3, 2016	–	19 games
Carl Hagelin	Illness	March 5, 2016	March 11, 2016	2 games
Evgeni Malkin	Upper Body	March 11, 2016	April 16, 2016	16 games
Scott Wilson	Lower Body	March 11, 2016	–	15 games
Olli Maatta	Lower Body	March 24, 2016	–	9 games
Brian Dumoulin	Concussion	March 26, 2016	April 2, 2016	3 games
Bryan Rust	Lower Body	March 29, 2016	–	6 games
Marc-Andre Fleury	Concussion	April 2, 2016	–	5 games
Beau Bennett	Undisclosed	April 5, 2016	–	2 games
Total				257 games

== Playoffs ==
The Penguins announced on April 11, 2016, that they will wear their Alternate jersey for all home games throughout the Stanley Cup Playoffs.

=== Game log ===
2016 Stanley Cup playoffs
Eastern Conference First Round vs. (M3) New York Rangers: Penguins won 4–1

#	Date	Visitor	Score	Home	OT	Starting Goalie	Attendance	Series	Recap
1	April 13	New York	2–5	Pittsburgh		Zatkoff	18,588	1–0	Recap
2	April 16	New York	4–2	Pittsburgh		Zatkoff	18,614	1–1	Recap
3	April 19	Pittsburgh	3–1	New York		Murray	18,006	2–1	Recap
4	April 21	Pittsburgh	5–0	New York		Murray	18,006	3–1	Recap
5	April 23	New York	3–6	Pittsburgh		Murray	18,607	4–1	Recap

Eastern Conference Second Round vs. (M1) Washington Capitals: Penguins won 4–2

#	Date	Visitor	Score	Home	OT	Starting Goalie	Attendance	Series	Recap
1	April 28	Pittsburgh	3–4	Washington	OT	Murray	18,506	0–1	Recap
2	April 30	Pittsburgh	2–1	Washington		Murray	18,506	1–1	Recap
3	May 2	Washington	2–3	Pittsburgh		Murray	18,601	2–1	Recap
4	May 4	Washington	2–3	Pittsburgh	OT	Murray	18,614	3–1	Recap
5	May 7	Pittsburgh	1–3	Washington		Murray	18,506	3–2	Recap
6	May 10	Washington	3–4	Pittsburgh	OT	Murray	18,650	4–2	Recap

Eastern Conference Finals vs. (A2) Tampa Bay Lightning: Penguins won 4–3

#	Date	Visitor	Score	Home	OT	Starting Goalie	Attendance	Series	Recap
1	May 13	Tampa Bay	3–1	Pittsburgh		Murray	18,554	0–1	Recap
2	May 16	Tampa Bay	2–3	Pittsburgh	OT	Murray	18,534	1–1	Recap
3	May 18	Pittsburgh	4–2	Tampa Bay		Murray	19,092	2–1	Recap
4	May 20	Pittsburgh	3–4	Tampa Bay		Murray	19,092	2–2	Recap
5	May 22	Tampa Bay	4–3	Pittsburgh	OT	Fleury	18,648	2–3	Recap
6	May 24	Pittsburgh	5–2	Tampa Bay		Murray	19,092	3–3	Recap
7	May 26	Tampa Bay	1–2	Pittsburgh		Murray	18,638	4–3	Recap

Stanley Cup Finals vs. (P3) San Jose Sharks: Penguins won 4–2

#	Date	Visitor	Score	Home	OT	Starting Goalie	Attendance	Series	Recap
1	May 30	San Jose	2–3	Pittsburgh		Murray	18,596	1–0	Recap
2	June 1	San Jose	1–2	Pittsburgh	OT	Murray	18,655	2–0	Recap
3	June 4	Pittsburgh	2–3	San Jose	OT	Murray	17,562	2–1	Recap
4	June 6	Pittsburgh	3–1	San Jose		Murray	17,562	3–1	Recap
5	June 9	San Jose	4–2	Pittsburgh		Murray	18,680	3–2	Recap
6	June 12	Pittsburgh	3–1	San Jose		Murray	17,562	4–2	Recap

Legend: = Win = Loss = Playoff series win

=== Injuries ===
Player	Injury	Date	Returned	Games missed
Kevin Porter	Lower Body	From season	–	24 games
Evgeni Malkin	Upper Body	From season	April 16, 2016	1 game
Scott Wilson	Lower Body	From season	–	24 games
Olli Maatta	Lower Body	From season	April 13, 2016	0 games
Bryan Rust	Lower Body	From season	April 16, 2016	1 game
Marc-Andre Fleury	Concussion	From season	May 2, 2016	7 games
Beau Bennett	Undisclosed	From season	May 21, 2016	15 games
Matt Murray	Upper Body	From season	April 19, 2016	2 games
Olli Maatta	Concussion	April 30, 2016	May 10, 2016	3 games
Eric Fehr	Undisclosed	May 2, 2016	May 7, 2016	1 game
Trevor Daley	Broken Ankle	May 20, 2016	–	9 games
Total				87 games

=== Suspensions ===
Date of Incident	Offender	Offense(s)	Date of Action	Length
May 2, 2016	Kris Letang	Interference against Marcus Johansson.	May 3, 2016	1 game

== Post-season ==
=== Injuries ===
Player	Injury	Date	Recovery
Daniel Sprong	Shoulder surgery	June 17, 2016	7–8 months

== Player statistics ==
Skaters

Regular season
Player	GP	G	A	Pts	+/−	PIM
Sidney Crosby	80	36	49	85	19	42
Kris Letang	71	16	51	67	9	66
Phil Kessel	82	26	33	59	9	18
Evgeni Malkin	57	27	31	58	1	65
Patric Hornqvist	82	22	29	51	15	36
Chris Kunitz	80	17	23	40	29	41
Matt Cullen	82	16	16	32	5	20
Nick Bonino	63	9	20	29	13	31
Carl Hagelin^{†}	37	10	17	27	18	18
Trevor Daley^{†}	53	6	16	22	8	26
Olli Maatta	67	6	13	19	27	22
David Perron^{‡}	43	4	12	16	-13	28
Brian Dumoulin	79	0	16	16	11	14
Tom Kuhnhackl	42	5	10	15	3	24
Eric Fehr	55	8	6	14	0	19
Beau Bennett	33	6	6	12	-1	10
Ian Cole	70	0	12	12	-3	59
Bryan Rust	41	4	7	11	1	12
Conor Sheary	44	7	3	10	-1	8
Ben Lovejoy	66	4	6	10	9	30
Justin Schultz^{†}	18	1	7	8	7	2
Derrick Pouliot	22	0	7	7	4	2
Scott Wilson	24	5	1	6	0	12
Pascal Dupuis	18	2	2	4	-1	12
Oskar Sundqvist	18	1	3	4	0	4
Rob Scuderi^{‡}	25	0	4	4	4	8
Kevin Porter	41	0	3	3	-2	0
Daniel Sprong	18	2	0	2	-1	0
Sergei Plotnikov^{‡}	32	0	2	2	-3	20
David Warsofsky^{‡}	12	1	0	1	-6	0
Tom Sestito	4	0	1	1	1	19
Adam Clendening	9	0	1	1	3	10
Dominik Simon	3	0	1	1	0	0
Kael Mouillierat	1	0	0	0	0	2
Josh Archibald	1	0	0	0	0	0
Bobby Farnham	3	0	0	0	0	5
Total		241	408	649	—	685

Playoffs
Player	GP	G	A	Pts	+/−	PIM
Phil Kessel	24	10	12	22	5	4
Sidney Crosby	24	6	13	19	-2	4
Evgeni Malkin	23	6	12	18	1	18
Nick Bonino	24	4	14	18	9	12
Carl Hagelin	24	6	10	16	9	14
Kris Letang	23	3	12	15	6	22
Patric Hornqvist	24	9	4	13	-5	10
Chris Kunitz	24	4	8	12	2	15
Conor Sheary	23	4	6	10	-1	8
Bryan Rust	23	6	3	9	7	6
Brian Dumoulin	24	2	6	8	-3	2
Olli Maatta	18	0	7	7	5	4
Matt Cullen	24	4	2	6	3	8
Ben Lovejoy	24	2	4	6	5	12
Trevor Daley	15	1	5	6	1	10
Tom Kuhnhackl	24	2	3	5	1	0
Eric Fehr	23	3	1	4	-1	6
Justin Schultz	15	0	4	4	1	0
Ian Cole	24	1	2	3	6	14
Beau Bennett	1	0	0	0	-2	0
Derrick Pouliot	2	0	0	0	1	2
Oskar Sundqvist	2	0	0	0	0	0
Total		73	128	201	—	171

Goaltenders

Regular season
Player	GP	GS	TOI	W	L	OT	GA	GAA	SA	SV%	SO	G	A	PIM
Marc-Andre Fleury	58	58	3462:33	35	17	6	132	2.29	1665	0.921	5	0	1	2
Matt Murray	13	13	748:35	9	2	1	25	2.00	355	0.930	1	0	0	0
Jeff Zatkoff	14	11	732:03	4	7	1	34	2.79	408	0.917	0	0	0	0
Total		82	4943:11	48	26	8	191	2.32	2428	0.921	6	0	1	2

Playoffs
Player	GP	GS	TOI	W	L	OT	GA	GAA	SA	SV%	SO	G	A	PIM
Matt Murray	21	21	1267:16	15	6	--	44	2.08	575	0.923	1	0	0	4
Jeff Zatkoff	2	2	117:13	1	1	--	6	3.07	65	0.908	0	0	0	0
Marc-Andre Fleury	2	1	79:19	0	1	--	4	3.03	32	0.875	0	0	0	0
Total		24	1463:48	16	8	0	54	2.21	672	0.920	1	0	0	4

^{†}Denotes player spent time with another team before joining the Penguins. Stats reflect time with the Penguins only.
^{‡}Denotes player was traded mid-season. Stats reflect time with the Penguins only.

== Notable achievements ==
=== Awards ===
Regular season
Player	Award	Awarded
K. Letang	NHL Third Star of the Week	January 4, 2016
E. Malkin	NHL All-Star game selection	January 6, 2016
K. Letang	NHL All-Star game selection	January 6, 2016
K. Letang	NHL Third Star of the Month	February 1, 2016
S. Crosby	NHL First Star of the Week	February 8, 2016
S. Crosby	NHL First Star of the Week	March 21, 2016
P. Kessel	NHL Third Star of the Week	March 28, 2016
S. Crosby	NHL First Star of the Month	April 1, 2016
M. Murray	NHL Third Star of the Week	April 4, 2016
S. Crosby	Conn Smythe Trophy	June 12, 2016

=== Team awards ===
Awarded week of March 27

Player	Award	Notes
Pascal Dupuis	Bill Masterton Memorial Trophy nominee	The Pittsburgh Chapter of the Professional Hockey Writers Association votes for the Penguins' Masterton nominee. Each NHL team selects a Masterton candidate from which the overall winner is chosen. The Masterton candidate is nominated as the player who best exemplifies the qualities of perseverance, sportsmanship and dedication to hockey. Sponsor: Trib Total Media
Bryan Rust	Rookie of the Year Award	Presented in memory of former Penguins forward Michel Briere to the player who makes a substantial contribution during his rookie season. Sponsor: Highmark
Marc-Andre Fleury	Player's Player Award	The players hold a vote at the end of the season for the player they feel exemplifies leadership for the team, both on and off the ice, a player dedicated to teamwork. Sponsor: American Eagle Outfitters
Sidney Crosby	Edward J. DeBartolo Award	The award recognizes the player who has donated a tremendous amount of time and effort during the season working on community and charity projects. Sponsor: Verizon Wireless
Kris Letang	Defensive Player of the Year	This award honors the defensive skills of an individual player on the team. Sponsor: PNC Wealth Management
Sidney Crosby	Most Valuable Player	Based on the overall contribution the player makes to the team. Sponsor: CONSOL Energy

=== Milestones ===
Regular season
Player	Milestone	Reached
D. Sprong	1st Career NHL Game	October 8, 2015
S. Plotnikov	1st Career NHL Game	October 8, 2015
D. Perron	500th Career NHL Game	October 8, 2015
O. Maatta	100th Career NHL Game	October 10, 2015
D. Sprong	1st Career NHL Goal; 1st Career NHL Point	October 15, 2015
M. Fleury	600th Career NHL Game	October 17, 2015
S. Plotnikov	1st Career NHL Assist; 1st Career NHL Point	October 17, 2015
K. Letang	500th Career NHL Game	October 28, 2015
B. Bennett	100th Career NHL Game	October 28, 2015
M. Fleury	40th Career NHL Shutout	October 31, 2015
E. Malkin	600th Career NHL Game	November 6, 2015
I. Cole	200th Career NHL Game	November 6, 2015
D. Perron	300th Career NHL Point	November 7, 2015
C. Sheary	1st Career NHL Game	December 16, 2015
C. Sheary	1st Career NHL Goal; 1st Career NHL Assist; 1st Career NHL Point	December 18, 2015
M. Murray	1st Career NHL Game	December 19, 2015
P. Kessel	700th Career NHL Game	December 19, 2015
B. Lovejoy	300th Career NHL Game	December 19, 2015
S. Wilson	1st Career NHL Assist; 1st Career NHL Point	December 21, 2015
M. Murray	1st Career NHL Win	December 21, 2015
K. Letang	300th Career NHL Point	December 26, 2015
N. Bonino	300th Career NHL Game	January 2, 2016
T. Kuhnhackl	1st Career NHL Game	January 9, 2016
T. Daley	800th Career NHL Game	January 17, 2016
T. Kühnhackl	1st Career NHL Assist; 1st Career NHL Point	January 23, 2016
O. Sundqvist	1st Career NHL Game	February 5, 2016
C. Kunitz	300th Career NHL Assist	February 5, 2016
S. Crosby	900th Career NHL Point	February 6, 2016
S. Wilson	1st Career NHL Goal	February 18, 2016
T. Kühnhackl	1st Career NHL Goal	February 20, 2016
P. Hornqvist	300th Career NHL Point	February 21, 2016
O. Sundqvist	1st Career NHL Assist; 1st Career NHL Point	February 24, 2016
P. Hornqvist	1st Career NHL Hat Trick	February 29, 2016
J. Archibald	1st Career NHL Game	March 5, 2016
M. Fleury	350th Career NHL Win	March 11, 2016
D. Simon	1st Career NHL Game; 1st Career NHL Assist; 1st Career NHL Point	March 13, 2016
C. Kunitz	800th Career NHL Game	March 15, 2016
P. Hornqvist	500th Career NHL Game	March 24, 2016
E. Fehr	500th Career NHL Game	March 24, 2016
S. Crosby	700th Career NHL Game	March 26, 2016
P. Kessel	300th Career NHL Assist	March 26, 2016
S. Crosby	600th Career NHL Assist	April 2, 2016
O. Sundqvist	1st Career NHL Goal	April 2, 2016
M. Murray	1st Career NHL Shutout	April 2, 2016

Playoffs
Player	Milestone	Reached
C. Sheary	1st Career Playoff Game; 1st Career Playoff Assist; 1st Career Playoff Point	April 13, 2016
J. Zatkoff	1st Career Playoff Game; 1st Career Playoff Win	April 13, 2016
O. Sundqvist	1st Career Playoff Game	April 13, 2016
T. Kuhnhackl	1st Career Playoff Game; 1st Career Playoff Goal; 1st Career Playoff Point	April 13, 2016
J. Schultz	1st Career Playoff Game	April 13, 2016
P. Hornqvist	1st Career Playoff Hat Trick	April 13, 2016
B. Rust	1st Career Playoff Game	April 16, 2016
M. Murray	1st Career Playoff Game; 1st Career Playoff Win	April 19, 2016
T. Kühnhackl	1st Career Playoff Assist	April 19, 2016
C. Sheary	1st Career Playoff Goal	April 21, 2016
M. Murray	1st Career Playoff Shutout	April 21, 2016
B. Rust	1st Career Playoff Goal; 1st Career Playoff Assist; 1st Career Playoff Point	April 23, 2016
K. Letang	100th Career Playoff Game	April 30, 2016
D. Pouliot	1st Career Playoff Game	May 2, 2016
J. Schultz	1st Career Playoff Assist; 1st Career Playoff Point	May 18, 2016
M. Fleury	100th Career Playoff Game	May 22, 2016
B. Dumoulin	1st Career Playoff Goal	May 22, 2016
I. Cole	1st Career Playoff Goal	June 6, 2016

== Transactions ==
The Penguins have been involved in the following transactions during the 2015–16 season:

=== Trades ===
July 1, 2015	To Toronto Maple Leafs Nick Spaling; Kasperi Kapanen; Scott Harrington; Conditional 1st-round pick in 2016 or 1st-round pick in 2017 or 2nd-round pick in 2017; 3rd-round pick in 2016	To Pittsburgh Penguins Phil Kessel^{[Note 1]} Tim Erixon; Tyler Biggs; Conditional PIT's 2nd-round pick in 2016 or TOR's 2nd-round pick in 2017
July 28, 2015	To Vancouver Canucks Brandon Sutter; BUF's 3rd-round pick in 2016	To Pittsburgh Penguins Nick Bonino; Adam Clendening; ANA's 2nd-round pick in 2016
December 14, 2015	To Chicago Blackhawks Rob Scuderi^{[Note 2]}	To Pittsburgh Penguins Trevor Daley
January 16, 2016	To Anaheim Ducks David Perron; Adam Clendening	To Pittsburgh Penguins Carl Hagelin
February 27, 2016	To Edmonton Oilers 3rd-round pick in 2016	To Pittsburgh Penguins Justin Schultz^{[Note 3]}
February 29, 2016	To Arizona Coyotes Sergei Plotnikov	To Pittsburgh Penguins Matthias Plachta conditional 7th-round pick in 2017
February 29, 2016	To Arizona Coyotes Matia Marcantuoni	To Pittsburgh Penguins Dustin Jeffrey; Dan O'Donoghue; James Melindy

Notes

- ^{Note 1} Toronto to retain 15% ($1.25 million) of salary as part of trade.
- ^{Note 2} Pittsburgh to retain 33% ($1.125 million) of salary as part of trade.
- ^{Note 3} Edmonton to retain 50% ($1.95 million) of salary as part of trade.

=== Free agents ===
Player	Acquired from	Lost to	Date	Contract terms
Andrew Ebbett		SC Bern	June 24, 2015	two-year contract
David Warsofsky	Boston Bruins		July 1, 2015	1 year/$600,000
Sergei Plotnikov	Lokomotiv Yaroslavl		July 1, 2015	1 year/$925,000
Kael Mouillierat	New York Islanders		July 1, 2015	1 year/$575,000
Kevin Porter	Detroit Red Wings		July 1, 2015	1 year/$575,000
Steven Oleksy	Washington Capitals		July 1, 2015	1 year/$575,000
Steve Downie		Arizona Coyotes	July 1, 2015	1 year/$1.75 million
Blake Comeau		Colorado Avalanche	July 1, 2015	3-year/$7.2 million
Paul Martin		San Jose Sharks	July 1, 2015	4-year/$19.4 million
Taylor Chorney		Washington Capitals	July 1, 2015	1 year/$700,000
Jayson Megna		New York Rangers	July 1, 2015	1 year/$600,000
Thomas Greiss		New York Islanders	July 1, 2015	2-year/$3 million
Daniel Winnik		Toronto Maple Leafs	July 1, 2015	2-year/$4.5 million
Will O'Neill	Winnipeg Jets		July 2, 2015	1 year/$575,000
Eric Fehr	Washington Capitals		July 28, 2015	3 years/$6 million
Matt Cullen	Nashville Predators		August 6, 2015	1 year/$800,000
Sergei Gonchar	Montreal Canadiens		August 14, 2015	Professional Tryout Contract
Christian Ehrhoff		Los Angeles Kings	August 23, 2015	1 year, $1.5 million
Tom Sestito	Vancouver Canucks		August 26, 2015	Professional Tryout Contract
Maxim Lapierre		Modo Hockey	September 1, 2015	one-year contract
Pierre-Luc Letourneau-Leblond		New Jersey Devils	September 8, 2015	1 year, $575,000
Tom Sestito	Vancouver Canucks		February 1, 2016	1 year, $575,000^{[a]}
Dominik Uher		Sparta Prague	June 1, 2016	one-year contract
Dustin Jeffrey		Lausanne HC	June 2, 2016	two-year contract
Niclas Andersen		Avtomobilist Yekaterinburg	June 2, 2016	one-year contract
Anton Zlobin		Dynamo Moscow	June 20, 2016	try-out contract

=== Waivers ===
Player	Claimed from	Lost to	Date
Bobby Farnham		New Jersey Devils	October 26, 2015
David Warsofsky		New Jersey Devils	February 29, 2016

=== Signings ===
Player	Date	Contract terms
Ian Cole	June 29, 2015	3 years/$6.3 million
Conor Sheary	July 1, 2015	2 years/$1.15 million^{[b]}
Reid McNeill	July 3, 2015	2 years/$1.15 million^{[a]}
Brian Dumoulin	July 9, 2015	2 years/$1.6 million
Bobby Farnham	July 13, 2015	1 year/$575,000^{[a]}
Dominik Simon	July 14, 2015	3 years/$2.0775 million^{[b]}
Beau Bennett	July 15, 2015	1 year/$800,000
Dominik Uher	July 17, 2015	1 year/$575,000^{[a]}
Daniel Sprong	August 28, 2015	3 years/$2.775 million^{[b]}
Olli Maatta	February 26, 2016	6 years/$24.5 million (contract extension)
Carter Rowney	March 9, 2016	2 years/$1.225 million^{[a]}
Bryan Rust	March 14, 2016	2 years/$1.28 million (contract extension)
Scott Wilson	March 14, 2016	2 years/$1.25 million (contract extension)
Tom Kuhnhackl	March 14, 2016	2 years/$1.25 million (contract extension)
Teddy Blueger	March 22, 2016	2 years/$1.85 million^{[b]}
Ethan Prow	March 29, 2016	2 years/$1.46 million^{[b]}
Sean Maguire	April 6, 2016	2 years/$1.85 million^{[b]}
Lukas Bengtsson	April 27, 2016	2 years/$1.85 million^{[b]}
Jake Guentzel	May 23, 2016	3 years/$2.775 million^{[b]}
Kevin Porter	June 20, 2016	1 year/$575,000^{[a]}

=== Other ===
Name	Date	Details
Tom Sestito	September 30, 2015	Released
Sergei Gonchar	October 3, 2015	Released
Sergei Gonchar	October 27, 2015	Named as Defensemen Development Coach
Pascal Dupuis	December 8, 2015	Unofficial Retirement
Mike Johnston	December 12, 2015	Relieved as head coach
Gary Agnew	December 12, 2015	Relieved as assistant coach
Mike Sullivan	December 12, 2015	Named as head coach
Craig Adams	January 26, 2016	Retirement

Notes

- ^{a} – Two-way contract
- ^{b} – Entry-level contract

== Draft picks ==
The 2015 NHL entry draft will be held on June 26–27, 2015 at the BB&T Center in Sunrise, Florida.

Round	#	Player	Pos	Nationality	College/Junior/Club team (League)
2	46	Daniel Sprong	RW	Netherlands	Charlottetown Islanders (QMJHL)
5	137	Dominik Simon	C	Czech Republic	HC Plzen (Czech Extraliga)
6	167	Frederik Tiffels	LW	Germany	Western Michigan University (NCHC)
7	197	Nikita Pavlychev	C	Russia	Des Moines Buccaneers (USHL)

Draft notes

- The Pittsburgh Penguins first-round pick went to the Edmonton Oilers as a result of a trade on January 2, 2015, that sent David Perron to the Penguins in exchange for Rob Klinkhammer and this pick.
- The Pittsburgh Penguins third-round pick went to the Florida Panthers as a result of a trade on March 5, 2014, that sent Marcel Goc to the Penguins in exchange for a 2014 fifth-round pick (#143–Miguel Fidler) and this pick.
- The Pittsburgh Penguins fourth-round pick went to the Toronto Maple Leafs as a result of a trade on February 25, 2015, that sent Daniel Winnik to the Penguins in exchange for Zach Sill, a 2016 second-round pick, and this pick.
