= 2015–16 Vancouver Canucks season =

NHL hockey team season

2015–16 Vancouver Canucks
- Division: 6th Pacific
- Conference: 13th Western
- 2015–16 record: 31–38–13
- Home record: 15–21–5
- Road record: 16–17–8
- Goals for: 191
- Goals against: 243

Team information
- General manager: Jim Benning
- Coach: Willie Desjardins
- Captain: Henrik Sedin
- Alternate captains: Alex Burrows; Dan Hamhuis; Daniel Sedin
- Arena: Rogers Arena
- Average attendance: 18,431 (97.5%)
- Minor league affiliate: Utica Comets (AHL)

Team leaders
- Goals: Daniel Sedin (28)
- Assists: Henrik Sedin (44)
- Points: Daniel Sedin (61)
- Penalty minutes: Derek Dorsett (177)
- Plus/minus: Jannik Hansen (+16)
- Wins: Ryan Miller (17)
- Goals against average: Ryan Miller (2.70)

The 2015–16 Vancouver Canucks season was the 46th season for the National Hockey League (NHL) franchise that was established on May 22, 1970. The season began its regular games on October 7, 2015, against the Calgary Flames with a 5−1 win. On March 25, 2016, the Canucks lost 4−0 to the St. Louis Blues and were eliminated from playoff contention. The Canucks missed the playoffs for the second time in three years.

== Off-season ==
Off-season changes began in late June at the 2015 NHL entry draft. Due to the Canucks having three goaltenders requiring waivers, goaltender Eddie Lack was traded to the Carolina Hurricanes (for a third-round pick at the draft and a seventh-round pick in 2016) to make room on the roster for Jacob Markstrom. This trade was disliked as fans saw the two draft picks as very little compensation for Lack. The Canucks would draft seven players at the draft. A few days later, long-time Canucks defenceman Kevin Bieksa was traded to the Anaheim Ducks in exchange for a second-round pick in 2016.

On July 1, Zack Kassian and a fifth-round pick in 2016 were traded to the Montreal Canadiens in exchange for Brandon Prust. Jim Benning continued by signing various free agents, including former Boston Bruins defenceman Matt Bartkowski and prospects Taylor Fedun and Richard Bachman, coming from the San Jose Sharks and Edmonton Oilers, respectively.

The following day, Hockey Operations Staff Laurence Gilman, Lorne Henning and Eric Crawford were released by the Canucks.

On July 28, the Canucks traded centre Nick Bonino, defenceman Adam Clendening, as well as the second-round pick acquired in the Bieksa trade, to the Pittsburgh Penguins for centre Brandon Sutter and a conditional third-round pick. One week later, the Canucks resigned Sutter to a five-year contract extension, lasting until the 2020–21 NHL season.

=== Training camp ===
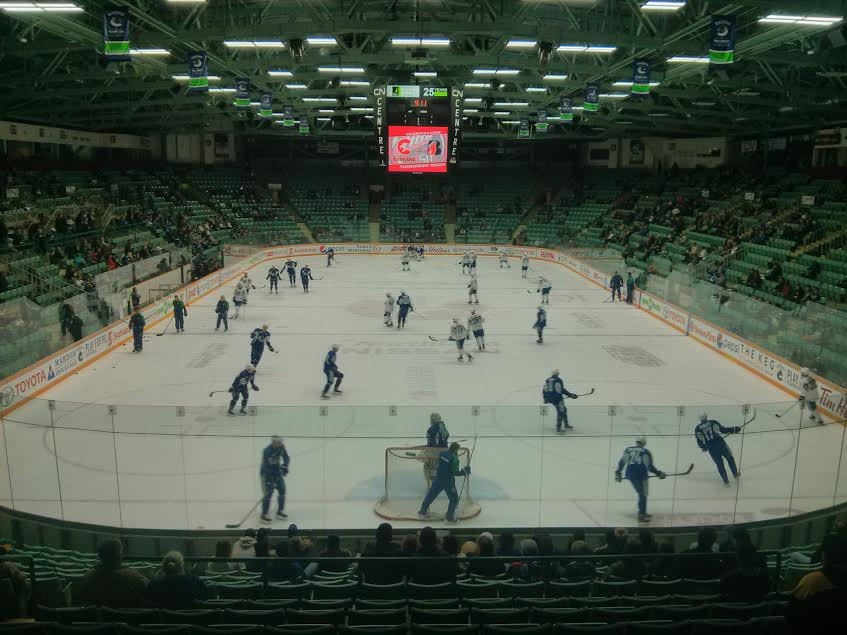
The Canucks at their 2015 training camp.

The Canucks held their training camp at CN Centre in Prince George, British Columbia, from September 18–20.

Training camp consisted of various activities, such as power-play drills, strength and conditioning exercises, and intra-squad scrimmages.

Head coach Willie Desjardins was unable to attend training camp. Desjardins was forced to have surgery on September 8 (a mere 10 days before training camp was due to begin), due to a flare-up of a chronic hip condition. While Desjardins wanted to be in attendance, the Canucks medical staff was unable to give him clearance to head to Prince George. In his place, assistant coach Glen Gulutzan (former Dallas Stars head coach) stepped up to run the training camp. Assistant coaches Perry Pearn and Doug Lidster were also in attendance.

Many Canucks prospects and minor-league players were invited to training camp. Some, such as Nicklas Jensen, Jake Virtanen and Alexandre Grenier were fighting for roster spots on the NHL club. The preseason came to an interesting end when the Canucks placed centre Linden Vey and defensemen Alex Biega and Frank Corrado on waivers in favour of defenceman Ben Hutton and forwards Jake Virtanen and Jared McCann. Corrado was claimed by the Toronto Maple Leafs the following day. Biega and Vey cleared waivers and were sent to the Utica Comets. Both were called up in December and would finish the season with the Canucks.

== Standings ==
Pacific Division
Pos	Team	GP	W	L	OTL	ROW	GF	GA	GD	Pts
1	y – Anaheim Ducks	82	46	25	11	43	218	192	+26	103
2	x – Los Angeles Kings	82	48	28	6	46	225	195	+30	102
3	x – San Jose Sharks	82	46	30	6	42	241	210	+31	98
4	Arizona Coyotes	82	35	39	8	34	209	245	−36	78
5	Calgary Flames	82	35	40	7	33	231	260	−29	77
6	Vancouver Canucks	82	31	38	13	26	191	243	−52	75
7	Edmonton Oilers	82	31	43	8	27	203	245	−42	70

Source: National Hockey League
x – Clinched playoff spot; y – Clinched division

Western Conference Wild Card
Pos	Div	Team	GP	W	L	OTL	ROW	GF	GA	GD	Pts
1	CE	x – Nashville Predators	82	41	27	14	37	228	215	+13	96
2	CE	x – Minnesota Wild	82	38	33	11	35	216	206	+10	87
3	CE	Colorado Avalanche	82	39	39	4	35	216	240	−24	82
4	PA	Arizona Coyotes	82	35	39	8	34	209	245	−36	78
5	CE	Winnipeg Jets	82	35	39	8	32	215	239	−24	78
6	PA	Calgary Flames	82	35	40	7	33	231	260	−29	77
7	PA	Vancouver Canucks	82	31	38	13	26	191	243	−52	75
8	PA	Edmonton Oilers	82	31	43	8	27	203	245	−42	70

Source: National Hockey League
x – Clinched playoff spot

== Schedule and results ==
The Canucks set a franchise record with a goal drought of 234 minutes and 52 seconds beginning after the Daniel Sedin goal at 12:00 of the first period on March 16 against Colorado and ending with the Bo Horvat goal at 6:52 of the first period on March 24 against Nashville.

=== Pre-season ===
Pre-season game log: 4–3–1 (Home: 3–1–1; Road: 1–2–0)
#	Date	Visitor	Score	Home	OT	Decision	Attendance	Record	Recap
1^{[a]}	September 21	San Jose	0–1	Vancouver	OT	Bachman	2,800 (approx.)	1–0–0	Recap
2	September 22	San Jose	4–0	Vancouver		Miller	––	1–1–0	Recap
3	September 25	Vancouver	1–4	Calgary		Bachman	19,289	1–2–0	Recap
4	September 26	Calgary	4–3	Vancouver	OT	Miller	––	1–2–1	Recap
5	September 28	Arizona	0–1	Vancouver		Markstrom	––	2–2–1	Recap
6	September 29	Vancouver	1–2	San Jose		Miller	14,165	2–3–1	Recap
7	October 1	Vancouver	5–2	Edmonton		Markstrom	16,839	3–3–1	Recap
8	October 3	Edmonton	2–3	Vancouver	OT	Miller	18,448	4–3–1	Recap
Notes:^{a} Game was played at The Q Centre in Colwood, British Columbia (Kraft Hockeyville game).

=== Regular season ===
2015–16 game log

October: 5–2–4 (Home: 1–2–3; Road: 4–0–1)
#	Date	Visitor	Score	Home	OT	Decision	Attendance	Record	Pts	Recap
1	October 7	Vancouver	5–1	Calgary		Miller	19,289	1–0–0	2	Recap
2	October 10	Calgary	3–2	Vancouver	OT	Miller	18,570	1–0–1	3	Recap
3	October 12	Vancouver	2–1	Anaheim	SO	Miller	17,174	2–0–1	5	Recap
4	October 13	Vancouver	3–0	Los Angeles		Miller	18,230	3–0–1	7	Recap
5	October 16	St. Louis	4–3	Vancouver		Miller	18,362	3–1–1	7	Recap
6	October 18	Edmonton	2–1	Vancouver	OT	Miller	18,261	3–1–2	8	Recap
7	October 22	Washington	3–2	Vancouver		Miller	18,188	3–2–2	8	Recap
8	October 24	Detroit	3–2	Vancouver	OT	Miller	18,312	3–2–3	9	Recap
9	October 27	Montreal	1–5	Vancouver		Miller	18,570	4–2–3	11	Recap
10	October 29	Vancouver	3–4	Dallas	OT	Miller	17,664	4–2–4	12	Recap
11	October 30	Vancouver	4–3	Arizona		Bachman	12,166	5–2–4	14	Recap

November: 4–7–3 (Home: 2–2–0; Road: 2–5–3)
#	Date	Visitor	Score	Home	OT	Decision	Attendance	Record	Pts	Recap
12	November 2	Philadelphia	1–4	Vancouver		Miller	18,264	6–2–4	16	Recap
13	November 4	Pittsburgh	3–2	Vancouver		Miller	18,570	6–3–4	16	Recap
14	November 7	Vancouver	2–3	Buffalo		Miller	19,070	6–4–4	16	Recap
15	November 8	Vancouver	3–4	New Jersey	OT	Miller	14,896	6–4–5	17	Recap
16	November 10	Vancouver	5–3	Columbus		Markstrom	14,148	7–4–5	19	Recap
17	November 12	Vancouver	2–3	Ottawa		Miller	19,229	7–5–5	19	Recap
18	November 14	Vancouver	2–4	Toronto		Miller	19,798	7–6–5	19	Recap
19	November 16	Vancouver	3–4	Montreal	OT	Markstorm	21,288	7–6–6	20	Recap
20	November 18	Vancouver	1–4	Winnipeg		Miller	15,294	7–7–6	20	Recap
21	November 21	Chicago	3–6	Vancouver		Miller	18,570	8–7–6	22	Recap
22	November 22	New Jersey	3–2	Vancouver		Markstorm	18,268	8–8–6	22	Recap
23	November 25	Vancouver	3–2	Minnesota		Miller	18,877	9–8–6	24	Recap
24	November 27	Vancouver	2–3	Dallas	SO	Miller	18,532	9–8–7	25	Recap
25	November 30	Vancouver	0–4	Anaheim		Miller	14,006	9–9–7	25	Recap

December: 5–6–2 (Home: 3–3–0; Road: 2–3–2)
#	Date	Visitor	Score	Home	OT	Decision	Attendance	Record	Pts	Recap
26	December 1	Vancouver	1–2	Los Angeles	OT	Markstrom	18,230	9–9–8	26	Recap
27	December 3	Dallas	4–2	Vancouver		Miller	18,910	9–10–8	26	Recap
28	December 5	Boston	4–0	Vancouver		Markstrom	18,570	9–11–8	26	Recap
29	December 7	Buffalo	2–5	Vancouver		Miller	18,278	10–11–8	28	Recap
30	December 9	NY Rangers	1–2	Vancouver		Miller	18,195	11–11–8	30	Recap
31	December 13	Vancouver	0–4	Chicago		Miller	21,711	11–12–8	30	Recap
32	December 15	Vancouver	2–6	Minnesota		Miller	18,804	11–13–8	30	Recap
33	December 17	Vancouver	0–2	Philadelphia		Markstrom	17,943	11–14–8	30	Recap
34	December 18	Vancouver	4–3	Detroit	SO	Miller	20,027	12–14–8	32	Recap
35	December 20	Vancouver	4–5	Florida	SO	Markstrom	13,459	12–14–9	33	Recap
36	December 22	Vancouver	2–1	Tampa Bay		Markstrom	19,092	13–14–9	35	Recap
37	December 26	Edmonton	1–2	Vancouver	OT	Markstrom	18,785	14–14–9	37	Recap
38	December 28	Los Angeles	5–0	Vancouver		Markstrom	18,570	14–15–9	37	Recap

January: 6–4–2 (Home: 3–2–1; Road: 3–2–1)
#	Date	Visitor	Score	Home	OT	Decision	Attendance	Record	Pts	Recap
39	January 1	Anaheim	1–2	Vancouver	SO	Markstrom	18,570	15–15–9	39	Recap
40	January 4	Arizona	3–2	Vancouver		Markstrom	18,377	15–16–9	39	Recap
41	January 6	Carolina	2–3	Vancouver		Markstrom	18,364	16–16–9	41	Recap
42	January 9	Tampa Bay	3–2	Vancouver	OT	Markstrom	18,335	16–16–10	42	Recap
43	January 11	Florida	2–3	Vancouver	OT	Markstrom	18,570	17–16–10	44	Recap
44	January 14	Vancouver	1–4	Washington		Miller	18,506	17–17–10	44	Recap
45	January 15	Vancouver	3–2	Carolina	OT	Markstrom	11,657	18–17–10	46	Recap
46	January 17	Vancouver	2–1	NY Islanders	SO	Miller	15,795	19–17–10	48	Recap
47	January 19	Vancouver	2–3	NY Rangers	OT	Miller	18,006	19–17–11	49	Recap
48	January 21	Vancouver	4–2	Boston		Markstrom	17,565	20–17–11	51	Recap
49	January 23	Vancouver	4–5	Pittsburgh		Miller	18,539	20–18–11	51	Recap
50	January 26	Nashville	2–1	Vancouver		Miller	18,570	20–19–11	51	Recap

February: 4–6–1 (Home: 2–5–1; Road: 2–1–0)
#	Date	Visitor	Score	Home	OT	Decision	Attendance	Record	Pts	Recap
51	February 4	Columbus	2–1	Vancouver	SO	Miller	18,199	20–19–12	52	Recap
52	February 6	Calgary	4–1	Vancouver		Miller	18,570	20–20–12	52	Recap
53	February 9	Vancouver	3–1	Colorado		Markstrom	14,436	21–20–12	54	Recap
54	February 10	Vancouver	2–1	Arizona		Miller	12,255	22–20–12	56	Recap
55	February 13	Toronto	5–2	Vancouver		Miller	18,570	22–21–12	56	Recap
56	February 15	Minnesota	5–2	Vancouver		Markstrom	18,437	22–22–12	56	Recap
57	February 18	Anaheim	5–2	Vancouver		Miller	18,435	22–23–12	56	Recap
58	February 19	Vancouver	2–5	Calgary		Markstrom	19,289	22–24–12	56	Recap
59	February 21	Colorado	1–5	Vancouver		Miller	18,431	23–24–12	58	Recap
60	February 25	Ottawa	3–5	Vancouver		Miller	18,570	24–24–12	60	Recap
61	February 28	San Jose	4–1	Vancouver		Miller	18,570	24–25–12	60	Recap

March: 4–11–1 (Home: 2–7–0; Road: 2–4–1)
#	Date	Visitor	Score	Home	OT	Decision	Attendance	Record	Pts	Recap
62	March 1	NY Islanders	3–2	Vancouver		Markstrom	18,264	24–26–12	60	Recap
63	March 3	San Jose	3–2	Vancouver		Miller	18,422	24–27–12	60	Recap
64	March 5	Vancouver	4–2	San Jose		Markstrom	17,562	25–27–12	62	Recap
65	March 7	Vancouver	1–5	Los Angeles		Miller	18,230	25–28–12	62	Recap
66	March 9	Arizona	2–3	Vancouver	OT	Markstrom	18,374	26–28–12	64	Recap
67	March 12	Nashville	2–4	Vancouver		Miller	18,570	27–28–12	66	Recap
68	March 14	Winnipeg	5–2	Vancouver		Markstrom	18,361	27–29–12	66	Recap
69	March 16	Colorado	3–1	Vancouver		Miller	18,427	27–30–12	66	Recap
70	March 18	Vancouver	0–2	Edmonton		Markstrom	16,839	27–31–12	66	Recap
71	March 19	St. Louis	3–0	Vancouver		Miller	18,402	27–32–12	66	Recap
72	March 22	Vancouver	0–2	Winnipeg		Markstrom	15,294	27–33–12	66	Recap
73	March 24	Vancouver	2–3	Nashville	SO	Miller	17,113	27–33–13	67	Recap
74	March 25	Vancouver	0–4	St. Louis		Markstrom	19,580	27–34–13	67	Recap
75	March 27	Chicago	3–2	Vancouver		Miller	18,570	27–35–13	67	Recap
76	March 29	San Jose	4–1	Vancouver		Markstrom	18,315	27–36–13	67	Recap
77	March 31	Vancouver	4–2	San Jose		Miller	15,689	28–36–13	69	Recap

April: 3–2–0 (Home: 2–0–0; Road: 1–2–0)
#	Date	Visitor	Score	Home	OT	Decision	Attendance	Record	Pts	Recap
78	April 1	Vancouver	3–2	Anaheim		Markstrom	16,331	29–36–13	71	Recap
79	April 4	Los Angeles	2–3	Vancouver		Miller	18,415	30–36–13	73	Recap
80	April 6	Vancouver	2–6	Edmonton		Markstrom	16,839	30–37–13	73	Recap
81	April 7	Vancouver	3–7	Calgary		Miller	19,289	30–38–13	73	Recap
82	April 9	Edmonton	3–4	Vancouver	SO	Markstrom	18,570	31–38–13	75	Recap

Legend: Win (2 points) Loss (0 points) Overtime/shootout loss (1 point)

==== Detailed records ====
Western Conference
Central Division
Opponent	Home	Away	Total	Pts.	Goals scored	Goals allowed
Chicago Blackhawks	1–1–0	0–1–0	1–2–0	2	8	10
Colorado Avalanche	1–1–0	1–0–0	2–1–0	4	9	5
Dallas Stars	0–1–0	0–0–2	0–1–2	2	7	11
Minnesota Wild	0–1–0	1–1–0	1–2–0	2	6	14
Nashville Predators	1–1–0	0–0–1	1–1–1	3	7	7
St. Louis Blues	0–2–0	0–1–0	0–3–0	0	3	11
Winnipeg Jets	0–1–0	0–2–0	0–3–0	0	2	11
Total	3–8–0	2–5–3	5–13–3	13	42	69
Pacific Division
Opponent	Home	Away	Total	Pts.	Goals scored	Goals allowed
Anaheim Ducks	1–1–0	2–1–0	3–2–0	6	9	13
Arizona Coyotes	1–1–0	2–0–0	3–1–0	6	11	9
Calgary Flames	0–1–1	1–2–0	1–3–1	3	13	20
Edmonton Oilers	2–0–1	0–2–0	2–2–1	5	9	14
Los Angeles Kings	1–1–0	1–1–1	2–2–1	5	8	14
San Jose Sharks	0–3–0	2–0–0	2–3–0	4	12	15
Vancouver Canucks	–	–	–	–	–	–
Total	5–7–2	8–6–1	13–13–3	29	62	85

Eastern Conference
Atlantic Division
Opponent	Home	Away	Total	Pts.	Goals scored	Goals allowed
Boston Bruins	0–1–0	1–0–0	1–1–0	2	4	6
Buffalo Sabres	1–0–0	0–1–0	1–1–0	2	7	5
Detroit Red Wings	0–0–1	1–0–0	1–0–1	3	5	5
Florida Panthers	1–0–0	0–0–1	1–0–1	3	7	7
Montreal Canadiens	1–0–0	0–0–1	1–0–1	3	8	5
Ottawa Senators	1–0–0	0–1–0	1–1–0	2	7	6
Tampa Bay Lightning	0–0–1	1–0–0	1–0–1	3	4	4
Toronto Maple Leafs	0–1–0	0–1–0	0–2–0	0	4	9
Total	4–2–2	3–3–2	7–5–4	18	46	47
Metropolitan Division
Opponent	Home	Away	Total	Pts.	Goals scored	Goals allowed
Carolina Hurricanes	1–0–0	1–0–0	2–0–0	4	6	4
Columbus Blue Jackets	0–0–1	1–0–0	1–0–1	3	6	4
New Jersey Devils	0–1–0	0–0–1	0–1–1	1	5	7
New York Islanders	0–1–0	1–0–0	1–1–0	2	4	4
New York Rangers	1–0–0	0–0–1	1–0–1	3	4	4
Philadelphia Flyers	1–0–0	0–1–0	1–1–0	2	4	3
Pittsburgh Penguins	0–1–0	0–1–0	0–2–0	0	6	8
Washington Capitals	0–1–0	0–1–0	0–2–0	0	3	7
Total	3–4–1	3–3–2	6–7–3	15	38	41

== Player statistics ==
=== Skaters ===
Regular season
Player	GP	G	A	Pts	+/−	PIM
Daniel Sedin	82	28	33	61	7	36
Henrik Sedin	74	11	44	55	0	24
Bo Horvat	82	16	24	40	−30	18
Jannik Hansen	67	22	16	38	16	32
Sven Baertschi	69	15	13	28	−14	14
Radim Vrbata	63	13	14	27	−30	12
Ben Hutton	75	1	24	25	−21	14
Alex Burrows	79	9	13	22	−13	49
Alexander Edler	52	6	14	20	−8	46
Jared McCann	69	9	9	18	−6	32
Matt Bartkowski	80	6	12	18	−19	50
Christopher Tanev	69	4	14	18	−8	8
Derek Dorsett	71	5	11	16	−13	177
Linden Vey	41	4	11	15	−14	6
Jake Virtanen	55	7	6	13	−7	45
Dan Hamhuis	58	3	10	13	−2	28
Emerson Etem^{†}	39	7	5	12	−8	9
Adam Cracknell^{‡}	44	5	5	10	1	14
Brandon Sutter	20	5	4	9	3	2
Luca Sbisa	41	2	6	8	5	26
Brandon Prust	35	1	6	7	−3	59
Yannick Weber	45	0	7	7	−17	24
Alex Biega	51	0	7	7	−11	22
Chris Higgins	33	3	1	4	−14	4
Markus Granlund^{†}	16	2	1	3	−3	6
Nikita Tryamkin	13	1	1	2	−3	10
Brendan Gaunce	20	1	0	1	−9	2
Taylor Fedun	1	0	1	1	1	0
Mike Zalewski	3	0	1	1	1	2
Alex Friesen	1	0	0	0	−2	0
Alexandre Grenier	6	0	0	0	−4	2
Ronalds Kenins	8	0	0	0	−1	6
Andrey Pedan	13	0	0	0	−3	16
Hunter Shinkaruk^{‡}	1	0	0	0	0	0

=== Goaltenders ===
Regular season
Player	GP	GS	TOI	W	L	OT	GA	GAA	SA	SV%	SO	G	A	PIM
Ryan Miller	51	51	3043:31	17	24	9	137	2.70	1634	.916	1	0	1	2
Jacob Markstrom	33	30	1847:26	13	14	4	84	2.73	988	.915	0	0	2	4
Richard Bachman	1	1	59:52	1	0	0	3	3.01	31	.903	0	0	0	0

^{†}Traded to Canucks mid-season. Stats reflect time with Canucks only.
^{‡}Traded (or lost by waivers) to another team mid-season. Stats reflect time with Canucks only.

=== Suspensions and fines ===
Player	Explanation	Length	Salary	Date issued	Ref
Brandon Prust	Spearing Boston forward Brad Marchand.	–	$5,000.00	December 6, 2015	
Jannik Hansen	Diving/embellishment during NHL game no. 510 in Tampa Bay on December 22, 2015, at 10:15 of the third period.	–	$2,000.00	December 31, 2015	
Jake Virtanen	Interference against San Jose defenceman Roman Polak.	2 games	$9,614.70	March 30, 2016	

== Awards and honours ==
=== Awards ===
Regular season
Player	Award	Awarded
Daniel Sedin	NHL Second Star of the Week	November 23, 2015
Daniel Sedin	NHL All-Star game selection	January 6, 2016

=== Milestones ===
Regular season
Player	Milestone	Reached
Ben Hutton	1st NHL game 1st NHL assist 1st NHL point	October 7, 2015
Jared McCann	1st NHL game	October 7, 2015
Jared McCann	1st NHL goal 1st NHL point	October 10, 2015
Jake Virtanen	1st NHL game	October 13, 2015
Brandon Sutter	500th NHL game 100th NHL goal	October 16, 2015
Henrik Sedin	1,100th NHL game	October 24, 2015
Jake Virtanen	1st NHL assist 1st NHL point	October 27, 2015
Derek Dorsett	100th NHL point	October 27, 2015
Brendan Gaunce	1st NHL game	October 29, 2015
Brendan Gaunce	1st NHL goal 1st NHL point	October 30, 2015
Alex Burrows	700th NHL game	November 2, 2015
Jake Virtanen	1st NHL goal	November 2, 2015
Jared McCann	1st NHL assist	November 4, 2015
Hunter Shinkaruk	1st NHL game	November 16, 2015
Alexandre Grenier	1st NHL game	November 18, 2015
Daniel Sedin	900th NHL point	November 21, 2015
Alexander Edler	200th NHL assist	November 21, 2015
Adam Cracknell	100th NHL game	November 27, 2015
Andrey Pedan	1st NHL game	December 1, 2015
Jannik Hansen	200th NHL point	December 3, 2015
Jannik Hansen	500th NHL game	December 9, 2015
Radim Vrbata	900th NHL game	December 13, 2015
Bo Horvat	100th NHL game	December 15, 2015
Alexander Edler	600th NHL game	December 17, 2015
Alex Biega	1st NHL assist	December 20, 2015
Sven Baertschi	100th NHL game	December 26, 2015
Jacob Markstrom	1st NHL assist 1st NHL point	December 26, 2015
Chris Higgins	700th NHL game	December 28, 2015
Daniel Sedin	1100th NHL game	January 1, 2016
Linden Vey	100th NHL game	January 6, 2016
Ben Hutton	1st NHL goal	January 17, 2016
Alex Friesen	1st NHL game	February 15, 2016
Dan Hamhuis	300th NHL point	March 7, 2016
Nikita Tryamkin	1st NHL game 1st NHL assist 1st NHL point	March 16, 2016
Matt Bartkowski	200th NHL game	March 22, 2016
Markus Granlund	100th NHL game	April 6, 2016
Nikita Tryamkin	1st NHL goal	April 7, 2016

=== Records ===
Player	Record	Date
Daniel Sedin	Most career goals in Canucks history	January 21, 2016

== Transactions ==
The Canucks been involved in the following transactions:

=== Trades ===
Date	Details		Ref
June 27, 2015	To Vancouver Canucks: 3rd round pick (66th overall) in 2015; 7th round pick in 2016	To Carolina Hurricanes: Eddie Lack
June 27, 2015	To Vancouver Canucks: 7th round pick in 2015	To San Jose Sharks: Patrick McNally
June 30, 2015	To Vancouver Canucks: 2nd round pick in 2016	To Anaheim Ducks: Kevin Bieksa
July 1, 2015	To Vancouver Canucks: Brandon Prust	To Montreal Canadiens: Zack Kassian; 5th round pick (124th overall) in 2016
August 28, 2015	To Vancouver Canucks: Brandon Sutter; BUF's 3rd round pick in 2016	To Pittsburgh Penguins: Nick Bonino; Adam Clendening; ANA's 2nd round pick in 2016
January 8, 2016	To Vancouver Canucks: Emerson Etem	To New York Rangers: Nicklas Jensen; 6th-round pick (157th overall) in 2017
February 22, 2016	To Vancouver Canucks: Markus Granlund	To Calgary Flames: Hunter Shinkaruk
February 24, 2016	To Vancouver Canucks: Philip Larsen	To Edmonton Oilers: Conditional 5th-round pick (126th overall) in 2017

=== Free agents acquired ===
Player	Date	Former team	Contract terms (in U.S. dollars)	Ref
Matt Bartkowski	July 1, 2015	Boston Bruins	1 year, $1.75 million	
Richard Bachman	July 1, 2015	Edmonton Oilers	1 year, $575,000	
Taylor Fedun	July 1, 2015	San Jose Sharks	1 year, $600,000	
Blair Jones	July 3, 2015	Philadelphia Flyers	1 year, $600,000	
Adam Cracknell	August 25, 2015	St. Louis Blues	1 year, $575,000	

=== Free agents lost ===
Player	Date	New team	Contract terms (in U.S. dollars)	Ref
Brad Richardson	July 1, 2015	Arizona Coyotes	3 years, $6.25 million	
Cal O'Reilly	July 1, 2015	Buffalo Sabres	2 years, $1.4 million	
Bobby Sanguinetti	July 2, 2015	Buffalo Sabres	1 year, $600,000	
Shawn Matthias	July 6, 2015	Toronto Maple Leafs	1 year, $2.3 million	
Ryan Stanton	July 24, 2015	Washington Capitals	1 year, $575,000	

=== Claimed via waivers ===
Player	Previous team	Date	Ref

=== Lost via waivers ===
Player	New team	Date claimed off waivers	Ref
Frank Corrado	Toronto Maple Leafs	October 6, 2015	
Adam Cracknell	Edmonton Oilers	February 29, 2016	

=== Player signings ===
Player	Date	Contract terms (in U.S. dollars)	Ref
Joseph LaBate	April 30, 2015	2-year, $680,000 entry-level contract	
Mackenze Stewart	May 12, 2015	3-year, $655,000 entry-level contract	
Jordan Subban	May 14, 2015	3-year, $755,000 entry-level contract	
Linden Vey	June 29, 2015	1 year, $1 million	
Alex Biega	June 30, 2015	1 year, $600,000	
Yannick Weber	July 1, 2015	1 year, $1.5 million	
Sven Baertschi	July 28, 2015	1 year, $900,000	
Brandon Sutter	August 4, 2015	5 years, $21.875 million contract extension	
Guillaume Brisebois	December 10, 2015	3-year, $703,333 entry-level contract	

== Draft picks ==
Below are the Vancouver Canucks' selections at the 2015 NHL entry draft, to be held on June 26–27, 2015, at the BB&T Center in Sunrise, Florida.

Round	#	Player	Pos	Nationality	College/Junior/Club team (League)
1	23	Brock Boeser	RW	United States	Waterloo Black Hawks (USHL)
3	66^{[a]}	Guillaume Brisebois	D	Canada	Acadie–Bathurst Titan (QMJHL)
4	114	Dmitry Zhukenov	C	Russia	Omskie Yastreby (MHL)
5	144	Carl Neill	D	Canada	Sherbrooke Phoenix (QMJHL)
5	149^{[b]}	Adam Gaudette	C	United States	Cedar Rapids RoughRiders (USHL)
6	174	Lukas Jasek	RW	Czech Republic	Ocelari Trinec (Czech Extraliga)
7	210^{[c]}	Tate Olson	D	Canada	Prince George Cougars (WHL)

Draft notes

- The Vancouver Canucks' second-round pick went to the Calgary Flames as the result of a trade on March 2, 2015, that sent Sven Baertschi to Vancouver in exchange for this pick.
- ^{a} The Carolina Hurricanes' third-round pick went to the Vancouver Canucks as the result of a trade on June 27, 2015, that sent Eddie Lack to Carolina in exchange for a 2016 seventh-round pick and this pick.
- The Vancouver Canucks' third-round pick went to the Anaheim Ducks as the result of a trade on June 27, 2014, that sent Nick Bonino, Luca Sbisa and a first and third-round pick in 2014 to Vancouver in exchange for Ryan Kesler and this pick.
- ^{b} The New York Rangers' fifth-round pick went to the Vancouver Canucks as the result of a trade on March 5, 2014, that sent Raphael Diaz to New York in exchange for this pick.
- The Vancouver Canucks' seventh-round pick went to the Minnesota Wild as the result of a trade on June 28, 2014, that sent a third-round pick in 2014 to Tampa Bay in exchange for a third-round pick in 2014 and this pick. Tampa Bay previously acquired this pick as the result of a trade on June 27, 2014, that sent a second-round pick in 2014 to Vancouver in exchange for Jason Garrison, the rights to Jeff Costello and this pick.
- ^{c} The San Jose Sharks' seventh-round pick (from New York Islanders via Tampa Bay Lightning) went to the Vancouver Canucks as the result of a trade on June 27, 2015, that sent Patrick McNally to San Jose in exchange for this pick.
