= Reid McNeill =

Ice hockey player (1992-)

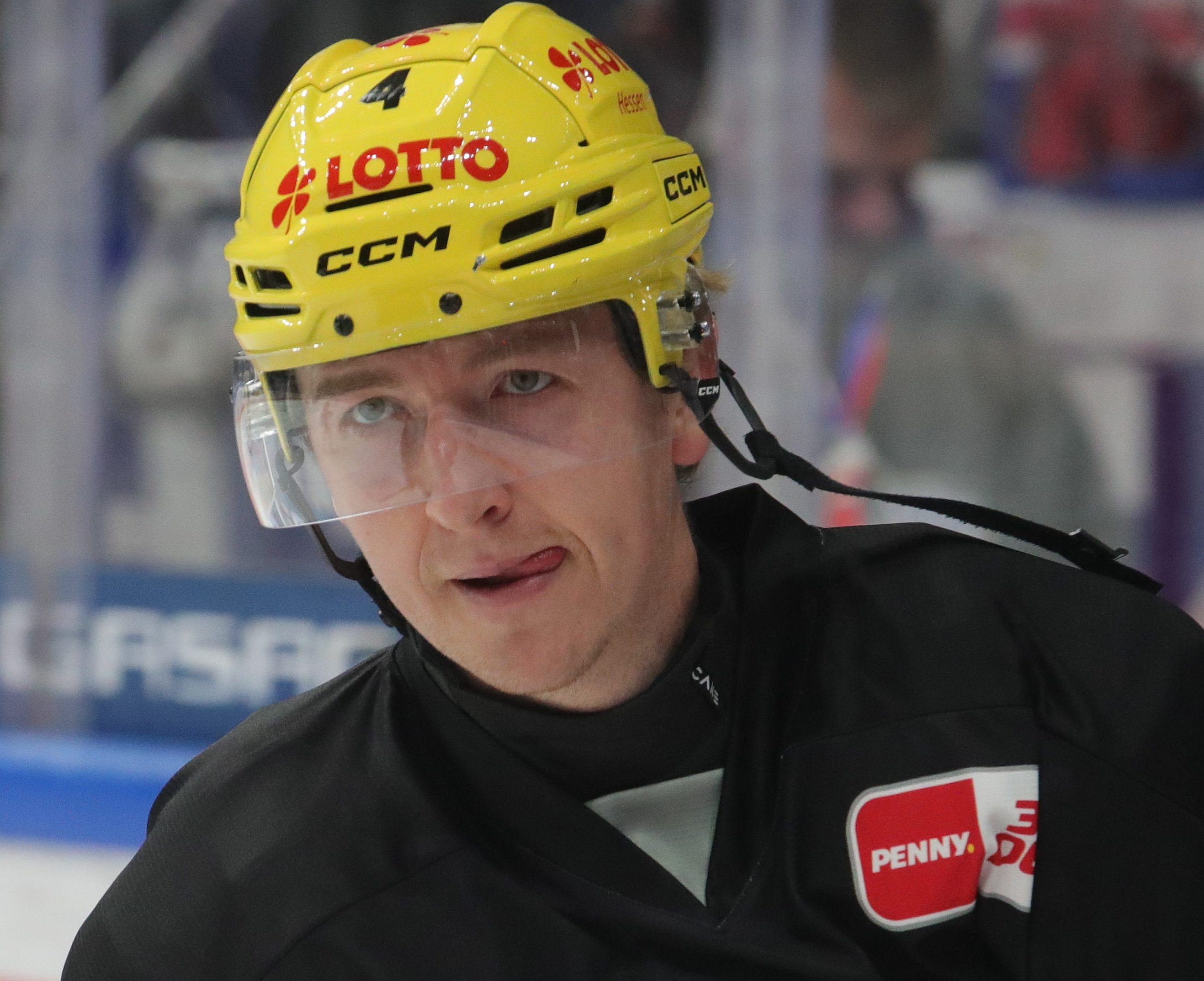
- McNeill with the Löwen Frankfurt in 2023
- Born: April 29, 1992 (age 34) London, Ontario, Canada
- Height: 6 ft 4 in (193 cm)
- Weight: 216 lb (98 kg; 15 st 6 lb)
- Position: Defence
- Shoots: Left
- ICEHL team Former teams: HK Olimpija; Wilkes-Barre/Scranton Penguins; Chicago Wolves; Syracuse Crunch; Dornbirn Bulldogs; Fischtown Pinguins; Löwen Frankfurt
- NHL draft: 170th overall, 2010; Pittsburgh Penguins
- Playing career: 2012–present

Reid McNeill (born April 29, 1992) is a Canadian professional ice hockey defenceman who is currently playing with HK Olimpija in the ICE Hockey League (ICEHL). He has formerly played in the American Hockey League (AHL).

== Playing career ==
McNeill played major junior hockey in the Ontario Hockey League with the London Knights and the Barrie Colts. He was selected in the sixth-round, 170th overall, in the 2010 NHL entry draft by the Pittsburgh Penguins. On May 16, 2012, McNeill signed a three-year entry-level contract with the Penguins.

In the midst of the 2016–17 season, and in his fifth season within the Wilkes-Barre/Scranton Penguins organization, McNeill was traded by Pittsburgh to the St. Louis Blues, in exchange for Danny Kristo on November 19, 2016. He played out the remainder of the campaign with the Blues AHL affiliate, the Chicago Wolves, appearing in 47 games for 8 points.

As a free agent at the conclusion of his contract with the Blues, McNeill agreed to continue in the AHL, signing a one-year deal with the Syracuse Crunch on July 20, 2017. In the 2017–18 season, McNeill made 59 appearances and posted 9 assists from the blueline. He added two goals for the Checkers in the playoffs through 7 games.

In the 2018–19 season, McNeill ventured into his first professional abroad, playing in the Austrian Hockey League (EBEL) with the Dornbirn Bulldogs. In his lone year in Austria, McNeill provided a steady influence on the blueline, contributing with 11 points in 46 games.

On October 3, 2019, McNeill returned to North America, joining the defending league champion Charlotte Checkers roster on a try-out to begin the 2019–20 season. McNeill was released before making his debut with the Checkers, and returned to his original AHL club, the Wilkes-Barre/Scranton Penguins, on a PTO. He made one appearance with the Penguins before he was released from his tryout on October 29, 2019. Opting to return abroad, McNeill signed a one-year contract with Danish club Herning Blue Fox of the Metal Ligaen on November 13, 2019.

== Career statistics ==
			Regular season					Playoffs
Season	Team	League	GP	G	A	Pts	PIM	GP	G	A	Pts	PIM
2009–10	London Nationals	GOJHL	20	0	7	7	26	—	—	—	—	—
2009–10	London Knights	OHL	53	2	3	5	32	12	0	1	1	0
2010–11	London Knights	OHL	62	2	4	6	70	6	0	0	0	4
2011–12	Barrie Colts	OHL	51	3	9	12	60	—	—	—	—	—
2012–13	Wheeling Nailers	ECHL	44	2	5	7	90	—	—	—	—	—
2012–13	Wilkes-Barre/Scranton Penguins	AHL	3	0	0	0	0	12	0	1	1	12
2013–14	Wilkes-Barre/Scranton Penguins	AHL	55	1	4	5	119	10	1	2	3	14
2014–15	Wilkes-Barre/Scranton Penguins	AHL	54	2	5	7	121	8	0	1	1	11
2015–16	Wilkes-Barre/Scranton Penguins	AHL	64	0	11	11	58	1	0	0	0	0
2016–17	Wilkes-Barre/Scranton Penguins	AHL	14	1	1	2	21	—	—	—	—	—
2016–17	Chicago Wolves	AHL	47	2	6	8	46	—	—	—	—	—
2017–18	Syracuse Crunch	AHL	59	0	9	9	67	7	2	0	2	2
2018–19	Dornbirn Bulldogs	EBEL	46	1	10	11	36	—	—	—	—	—
2019–20	Wilkes-Barre/Scranton Penguins	AHL	1	0	0	0	2	—	—	—	—	—
2019–20	Herning Blue Fox	DEN	28	5	9	14	22	—	—	—	—	—
2020–21	Herning Blue Fox	DEN	34	7	12	19	37	3	0	0	0	0
2021–22	Fischtown Pinguins	DEL	14	0	2	2	6	—	—	—	—	—
2021–22	Löwen Frankfurt	DEL2	12	1	6	7	2	12	2	3	5	14
2022–23	Löwen Frankfurt	DEL	50	1	11	12	20	2	0	0	0	2
2023–24	Löwen Frankfurt	DEL	48	2	3	5	34	—	—	—	—	—
2024–25	Löwen Frankfurt	DEL	49	2	10	12	44	2	1	0	1	0
2025–26	Löwen Frankfurt	DEL	21	0	3	3	48	—	—	—	—	—
2025–26	HK Olimpija	ICEHL	—	—	—	—	—	7	1	2	3	16
AHL totals			297	6	36	42	434	38	3	4	7	39
