= Daniel Sprong =

Dutch ice hockey player (born 1997)

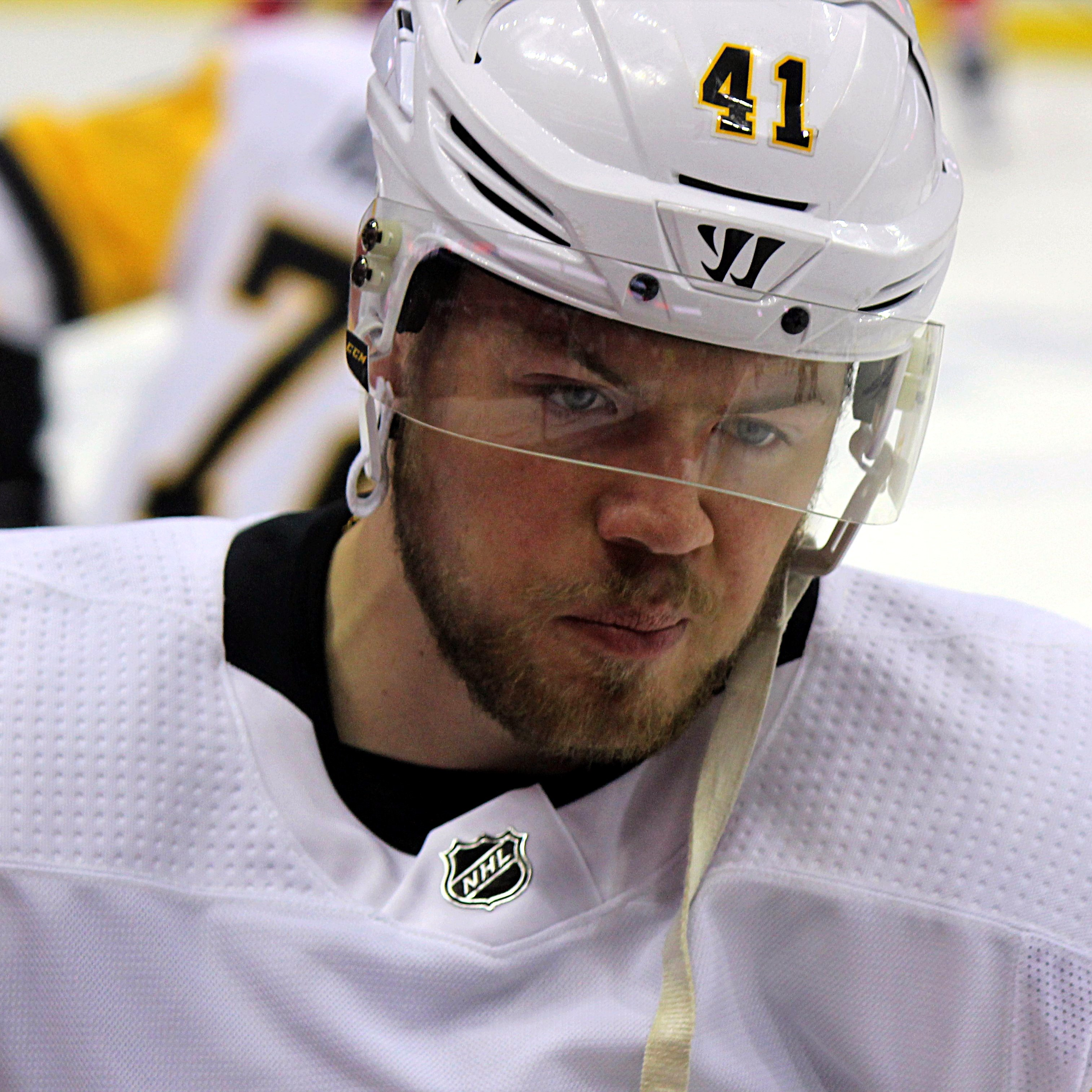
- Sprong with the Pittsburgh Penguins during the 2018 Stanley Cup playoffs
- Born: March 17, 1997 (age 29) Amsterdam, Netherlands
- Height: 6 ft 0 in (183 cm)
- Weight: 195 lb (88 kg; 13 st 13 lb)
- Position: Right wing
- Shoots: Right
- KHL team Former teams: Avtomobilist Yekaterinburg; Pittsburgh Penguins; Anaheim Ducks; Washington Capitals; Seattle Kraken; Detroit Red Wings; Vancouver Canucks; New Jersey Devils; CSKA Moscow
- NHL draft: 46th overall, 2015; Pittsburgh Penguins
- Playing career: 2015–present

Daniel Sprong (born March 17, 1997) is a Dutch professional ice hockey player who is a right winger for Avtomobilist Yekaterinburg in the Kontinental Hockey League (KHL). Sprong was originally selected by the Pittsburgh Penguins in the second round (46th overall) of the 2015 NHL entry draft after playing two seasons with the Charlottetown Islanders of the Quebec Major Junior Hockey League (QMJHL), and made the Penguins immediately after being drafted, though he would return to the QMJHL and play two more seasons with the Islanders. He played parts of four seasons with Pittsburgh and their American Hockey League affiliate before being traded to the Anaheim Ducks in 2018, where he spent two seasons before being traded to the Washington Capitals in 2020. After his initial stint with the Kraken, he had tenures with the Detroit Red Wings and Vancouver Canucks before returning to Seattle. Following the 2024-25 NHL season, Sprong moved to Russia, playing with CSKA Moscow before being traded midseason to Avtomobilist Yekaterinburg.

Born in the Netherlands, Sprong moved to Canada with his family in 2005 in order to further his hockey career.

== Playing career ==
=== Junior ===
Sprong first played hockey as a young child in his hometown of Amsterdam. Due to the lack of a developed hockey program in the Netherlands, at ages four and five, Sprong played on teams with players as old as twelve or thirteen. To help further Sprong's development in hockey, his family moved to L'Île-Bizard, Quebec, in 2005 when he was eight years old. In Quebec, he played within the Deux-Rives minor ice hockey program and competed at the 2008 and 2009 Quebec International Pee-Wee Hockey Tournaments.

For the 2011–12 season, Sprong joined the Wilkes-Barre/Scranton Knights, a Pennsylvania-based travelling team. Back in Quebec the following season, with the Lac St-Louis Tigres, Sprong set the Quebec Midget Espoir AA league (the second-tier league in Quebec; as a non-citizen Sprong was ineligible to play in the top tier) scoring record with 104 points in 30 games. He was then selected thirteenth overall by the Charlottetown Islanders in the 2013 QMJHL entry draft, and joined the team for the 2013–14 season. He led the Islanders in scoring with 68 points in 67 games and his outstanding play was recognized when he was named to the 2013–14 QMJHL All-Rookie Team. The following 2014–15 season, Sprong again led the Islanders in scoring, and was twelfth overall in the QMJHL, with 88 points. He was also invited to take part in the 2015 CHL/NHL Top Prospects Game. In the NHL Central Scouting Bureau's final list of players for the draft, Sprong was listed as the 20th best North American skater. He was ultimately selected in the second round, 46th overall, by the Pittsburgh Penguins.

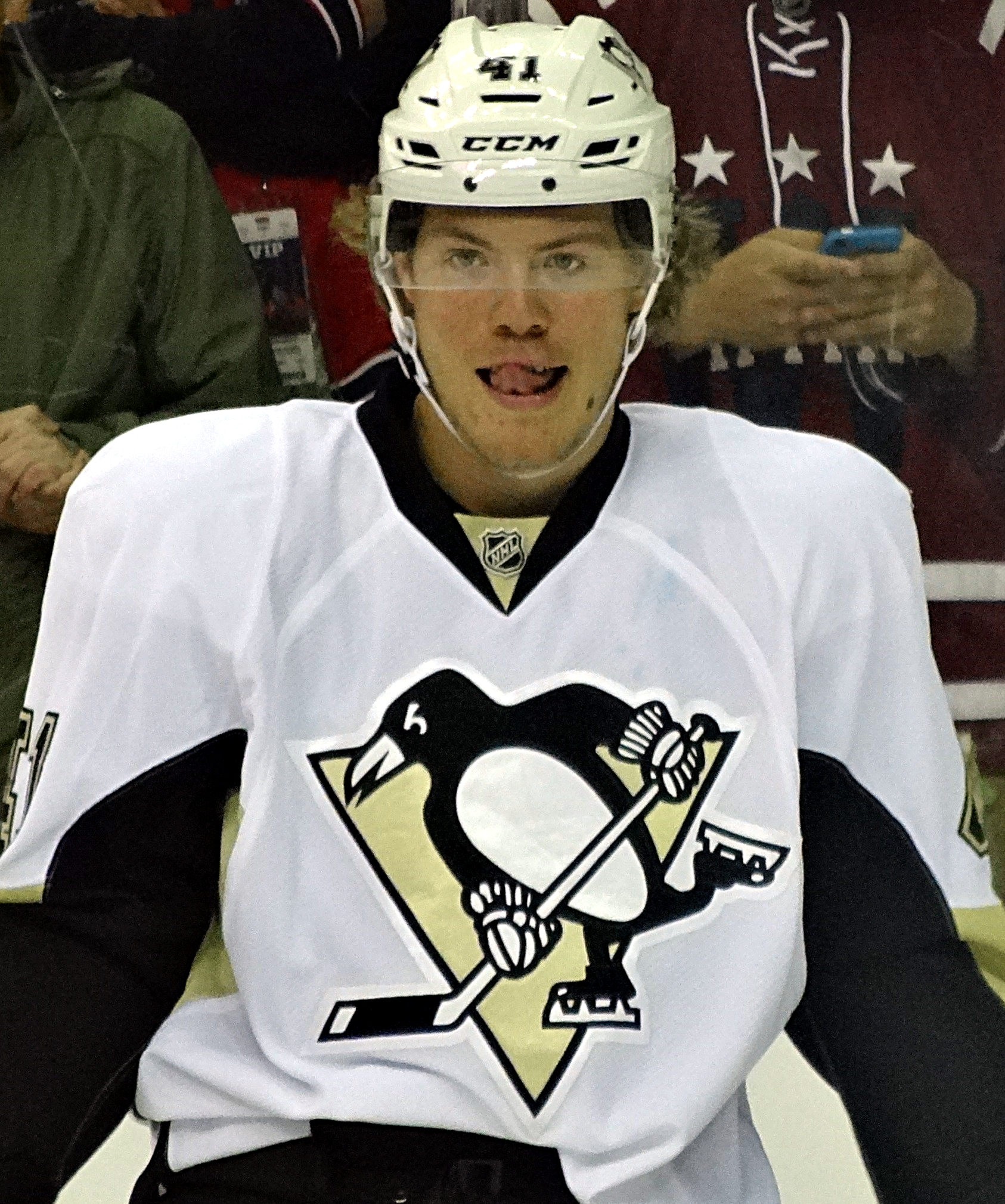
Sprong with the Penguins in 2015

After his stint with the Penguins in 2015, Sprong rejoined the Islanders for the remainder of the 2015–16 season. He played 33 games for the Islanders and recorded 46 points. The team made the playoffs, where Sprong scored a further 15 points before the team was eliminated in the second round. An injury sustained during practice with the Penguins during the 2016 Stanley Cup playoffs kept Sprong out until January, 2017 when he rejoined Charlottetown. He only played 31 games that 2016–17 season, but finished with 59 points, the highest points-per-game average in the entire league. He finished his career with the Islanders with the third goals and second most points in team history, and during the playoffs he tied the record for most career goals and broke the records for most assists and points. Sprong led the Islanders in scoring with 20 points in 12 games as the team lost in the third round of the playoffs, ending his junior career. Following that he was recalled again by the Penguins to train with them during their time in the NHL playoffs.

=== Professional ===
Sprong signed a three-year entry-level contract with the Penguins on August 28, 2015. After impressing Penguins' management at training camp, Sprong made the Penguins opening roster for the 2015–16 season. In doing so, Sprong became the first player taken in the second round or later to make the opening night roster immediately after being drafted since Brandon Saad in 2011. His first game was on October 8 against the Dallas Stars. Sprong recorded his first goal on October 15, his fourth game, against Ottawa Senators goaltender Craig Anderson. Sprong played 18 games for the Penguins, scoring two goals, before the team decided to send him back to Charlottetown for the remainder of the season. When Sprong's QMJHL season ended he was reassigned to the Penguins minor league affiliate, the Wilkes-Barre/Scranton Penguins of the American Hockey League for their playoff run. He appeared in 10 games and recorded 7 points before the team was eliminated in the third round; Sprong was subsequently recalled to Pittsburgh to serve as a reserve player for their final playoff games. During a practice in the playoffs, Sprong injured his shoulder; the subsequent surgery and healing meant he would be unable to play again for roughly 7–8 months.

On December 3, 2018, the Penguins traded Sprong to the Anaheim Ducks in exchange for Marcus Pettersson. Remaining with the Ducks through the 2018–19 season, Sprong notched new career highs in posting 14 goals and 19 points in 47 games.

After a sub-par training camp with the Ducks, Sprong was placed on waivers prior to the 2019–20 season and upon going unclaimed was reassigned to the San Diego Gulls. With the direction to play a more complete two-way game, Sprong responded with scoring 11 goals and 27 points through 39 games. Sprong was recalled by the Ducks; however, he was unable to replicate his previous offensive performance with the Ducks, contributing with 2 points through 8 games before returning to the Gulls.

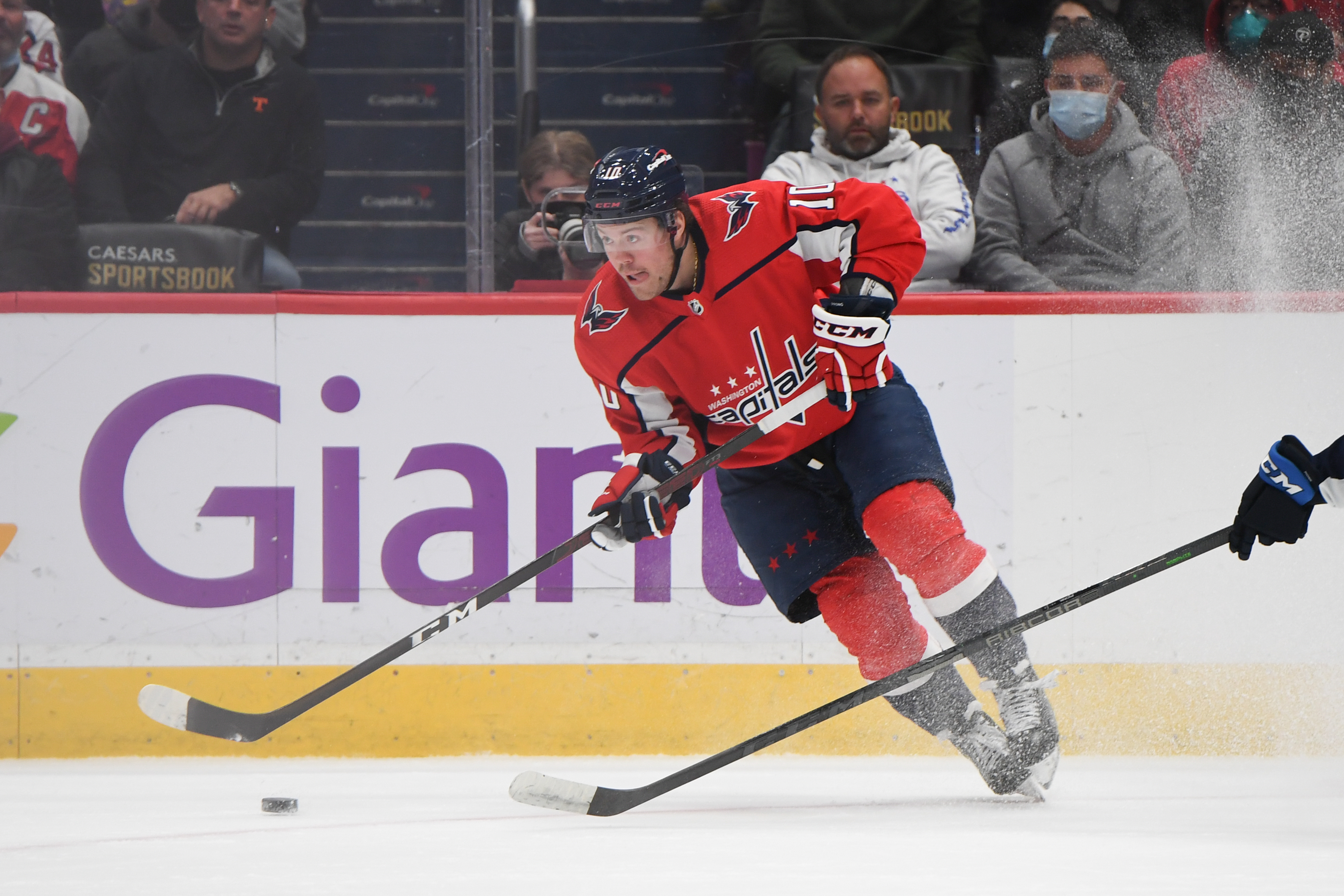
Sprong in action with the Washington Capitals in 2022

Sprong was traded to the Washington Capitals on February 24, 2020, in exchange for Christian Djoos. He was assigned to the Capitals' affiliate, the Hershey Bears. He signed a two-year, $1.45 million contract extension on September 18, 2020. He was traded to the Seattle Kraken, along with two draft picks, on March 21, 2022, for Marcus Johansson.

At the conclusion of his contract with the Kraken, Sprong as a free agent went unsigned over the summer. Approaching the 2022–23 season, he rejoined the Kraken in signing a professional tryout contract to attend training camp. He was later signed during the preseason to a one-year, two-way contract with the Kraken on October 3, 2022. He recorded a career-high 46 points in 66 games with the Kraken.

On July 1, 2023, Sprong signed a one-year, $2 million contract with the Detroit Red Wings. He recorded 18 goals and 25 assists in 76 games with the Red Wings.

On July 20, 2024, Sprong signed as a free agent to a one-year deal with the Vancouver Canucks worth $975,000 for the 2024–25 season. To start the season, Sprong was unable to cement a defined role amongst the Canucks forward ranks, appearing in 9 games and registering 1 goal and 3 points. On November 8, 2024, Sprong's brief tenure with the Canucks concluded after he was traded in a return to the Seattle Kraken in exchange for future considerations.

On January 8, 2025, Sprong was placed on waivers by the Kraken after posting just 2 points in 10 games, clearing fully on January 9th, with the intention to assign him to the Kraken's AHL affiliate, the Coachella Valley Firebirds. Sprong showed his offensive acumen in posting 25 points through just 19 games with the Firebirds, before he was traded at the NHL deadline by the Kraken to the New Jersey Devils in exchange for seventh-round pick in 2026 on March 7, 2025.

As a free agent, Sprong left North America and was signed to a one-year contract with Russian club, HC CSKA Moscow of the KHL, on July 23, 2025. Following an entire month as a healthy scratch for CSKA Moscow despite scoring 31 points in 29 games, he was traded to Avtomobilist Yekaterinburg.

== Personal life ==
Sprong was born in Amsterdam, Netherlands. His father, Hannie, was a professional hockey player in the Netherlands during the early 1990s and later managed a team there. At the age of seven Sprong moved from the Netherlands to Canada with his family in order to help develop his hockey career. The family settled in Île Bizard, Quebec, a community near Montreal. Sprong remains a Dutch citizen, but has applied for Canadian citizenship; as of 2022, he had still not received it, though was a Canadian permanent resident. As a result, Sprong has not participated in any international tournaments, as he has declined to play for the Dutch national team, preferring to remain eligible for the Canadian national team.

Sprong is the third NHL player born in the Netherlands; the first two, Ed Kea and Ed Beers, were also raised in Canada.

In 2023, racing driver Zachary Claman DeMelo accused Sprong of assaulting him at a nightclub during the Detroit Grand Prix weekend.

== Career statistics ==
			Regular season					Playoffs
Season	Team	League	GP	G	A	Pts	PIM	GP	G	A	Pts	PIM
2011–12	Deux-Rives Dauphins Bantam AA	LSLBAA	19	30	8	38	32	—	—	—	—	—
2011–12	Wilkes-Barre/Scranton Knights Bantam	AYBHL	11	9	23	32	24	4	7	4	11	4
2012–13	Lac St-Louis Tigres Espoir	QMEAA	30	48	56	104	36	3	5	3	8	0
2013–14	Charlottetown Islanders	QMJHL	67	30	38	68	20	4	4	1	5	0
2014–15	Charlottetown Islanders	QMJHL	68	39	49	88	18	10	7	4	11	6
2015–16	Pittsburgh Penguins	NHL	18	2	0	2	0	—	—	—	—	—
2015–16	Charlottetown Islanders	QMJHL	33	16	30	46	22	12	4	11	15	12
2015–16	Wilkes-Barre/Scranton Penguins	AHL	—	—	—	—	—	10	5	2	7	2
2016–17	Charlottetown Islanders	QMJHL	31	32	27	59	29	12	9	11	20	17
2017–18	Wilkes-Barre/Scranton Penguins	AHL	65	32	33	65	28	3	1	0	1	0
2017–18	Pittsburgh Penguins	NHL	8	2	1	3	0	—	—	—	—	—
2018–19	Pittsburgh Penguins	NHL	16	0	4	4	0	—	—	—	—	—
2018–19	Anaheim Ducks	NHL	47	14	5	19	10	—	—	—	—	—
2019–20	San Diego Gulls	AHL	39	11	16	27	24	—	—	—	—	—
2019–20	Anaheim Ducks	NHL	8	1	1	2	0	—	—	—	—	—
2019–20	Hershey Bears	AHL	5	1	5	6	2	—	—	—	—	—
2020–21	Washington Capitals	NHL	42	13	7	20	12	3	0	1	1	4
2021–22	Washington Capitals	NHL	47	8	6	14	8	—	—	—	—	—
2021–22	Seattle Kraken	NHL	16	6	0	6	0	—	—	—	—	—
2022–23	Seattle Kraken	NHL	66	21	25	46	14	10	1	1	2	0
2023–24	Detroit Red Wings	NHL	76	18	25	43	22	—	—	—	—	—
2024–25	Vancouver Canucks	NHL	9	1	2	3	2	—	—	—	—	—
2024–25	Seattle Kraken	NHL	10	1	1	2	0	—	—	—	—	—
2024–25	Coachella Valley Firebirds	AHL	19	11	14	25	6	—	—	—	—	—
2024–25	New Jersey Devils	NHL	11	0	2	2	0	1	0	0	0	0
2025–26	CSKA Moscow	KHL	29	12	19	31	6	—	—	—	—	—
2025–26	Avtomobilist Yekaterinburg	KHL	23	18	15	33	32	6	5	2	7	2
NHL totals			374	87	79	166	68	14	1	2	3	4
KHL totals			52	30	34	64	38	6	5	2	7	2

== Awards and honours ==
Award	Year
QMJHL
All-Rookie Team	2013–14

Awards and achievements
Preceded by Dylan Strome	AHL Rookie of the Month; December 2017	Succeeded by Mitchell Stephens
