= Adam Clendening =

American ice hockey player (born 1992)

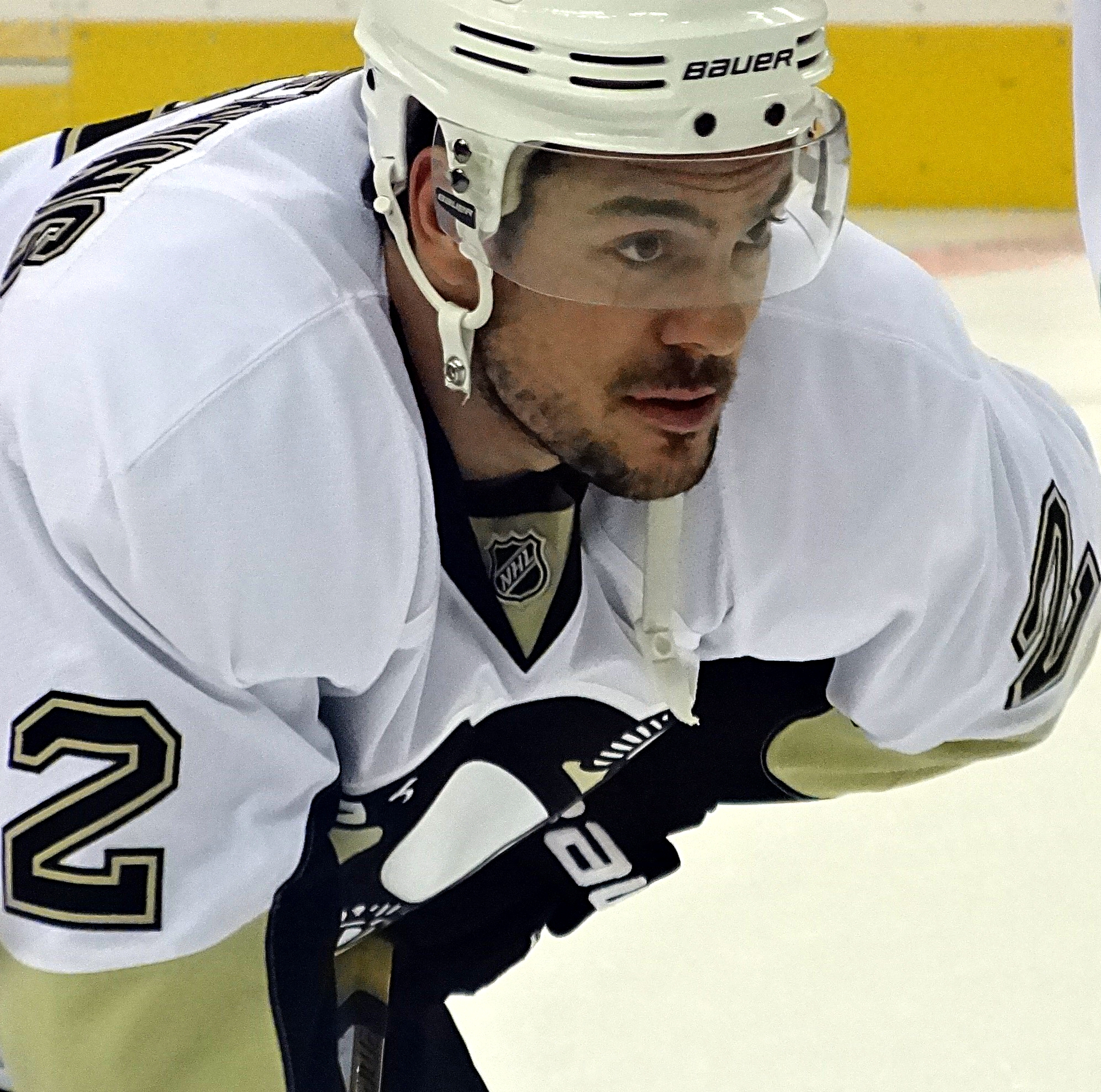
- Clendening with the Pittsburgh Penguins in 2015
- Born: October 26, 1992 (age 34) Niagara Falls, New York, U.S.
- Height: 6 ft 0 in (183 cm)
- Weight: 195 lb (88 kg; 13 st 13 lb)
- Position: Defense
- Shoots: Right
- team Former teams: Free agent Chicago Blackhawks; Vancouver Canucks; Pittsburgh Penguins; Edmonton Oilers; New York Rangers; Arizona Coyotes; Columbus Blue Jackets; Ilves; Kunlun Red Star; Shanghai Dragons
- National team: United States
- NHL draft: 36th overall, 2011; Chicago Blackhawks
- Playing career: 2012–present

Adam Clendening (born October 26, 1992) is an American professional ice hockey defenseman who is currently an unrestricted free agent. He most recently played for the Cleveland Monsters in the American Hockey League (AHL). Clendening was raised in Wheatfield, New York. He was selected 36th overall by the Chicago Blackhawks in the 2011 NHL entry draft.

== Early life ==
Clendening was born on October 26, 1992, in Niagara Falls, New York. He grew up in Wheatfield, New York, but his father Frank was a lifelong fan of the Boston Bruins of the National Hockey League (NHL), and Clendening grew up supporting the Bruins rather than the nearby Buffalo Sabres. His parents were also friends with the parents of future NHL star Patrick Kane, and the two would practice playing ice hockey together. In 2004, Clendening participated in the Quebec International Pee-Wee Hockey Tournament with a team from Rochester, New York. When he enrolled at Niagara-Wheatfield High School, Clendening originally wanted to pursue golf, playing on the varsity team as a freshman. The following year, however, he moved to Toronto to pursue hockey.

== Playing career ==
=== Junior ===
After securing the permission of his mother Ann, Clendening moved to Canada at the age of 14 to play for the Toronto Marlboros AAA junior ice hockey team of the Greater Toronto Hockey League, where he was coached by NHL alum Steve Thomas. After he put up 45 points in 38 games with Toronto, the USA Hockey National Team Development Program selected Clendening for their under-17 team based in Ann Arbor, Michigan. With the development program, Clendening not only competed in the North American Hockey League (NAHL), but would play against NCAA Division I and Division III college ice hockey teams, as well as international squads. He had a breakout sophomore season with USA Hockey, leading all junior defensemen with 49 points (including 14 goals) in 65 North American games, while also leading his team with 120 penalty minutes. His 20 points in 18 international games also led the development team.

=== NCAA ===
His performance with the USA development team made Clendening a valuable recruit, who was sought after both by junior teams and by college programs. He originally made a verbal commitment to play for Boston College, but that arrangement fell through when Clendening continued to pursue his options in the Ontario Hockey League (OHL). The London Knights selected Clendening in the 2008 OHL Draft, but Clendening chose to attend Boston University and play for the Terriers after assessing that scouts were looking more intently at college players than junior hockey skaters.

After two seasons with the Terriers, posting nine goals and 59 points for a combined +19 in 77 games, Clendening chose to leave the program in favor of pursuing an NHL career.

=== Professional ===
==== Chicago Blackhawks ====
Clendening made his NHL debut on November 20, 2014, and scored his first NHL goal on his first shot against Jonas Hiller of the Calgary Flames. Clendening spent the majority of his time with the club with their American Hockey League (AHL) affiliate, the Rockford Icehogs.

==== Vancouver Canucks ====
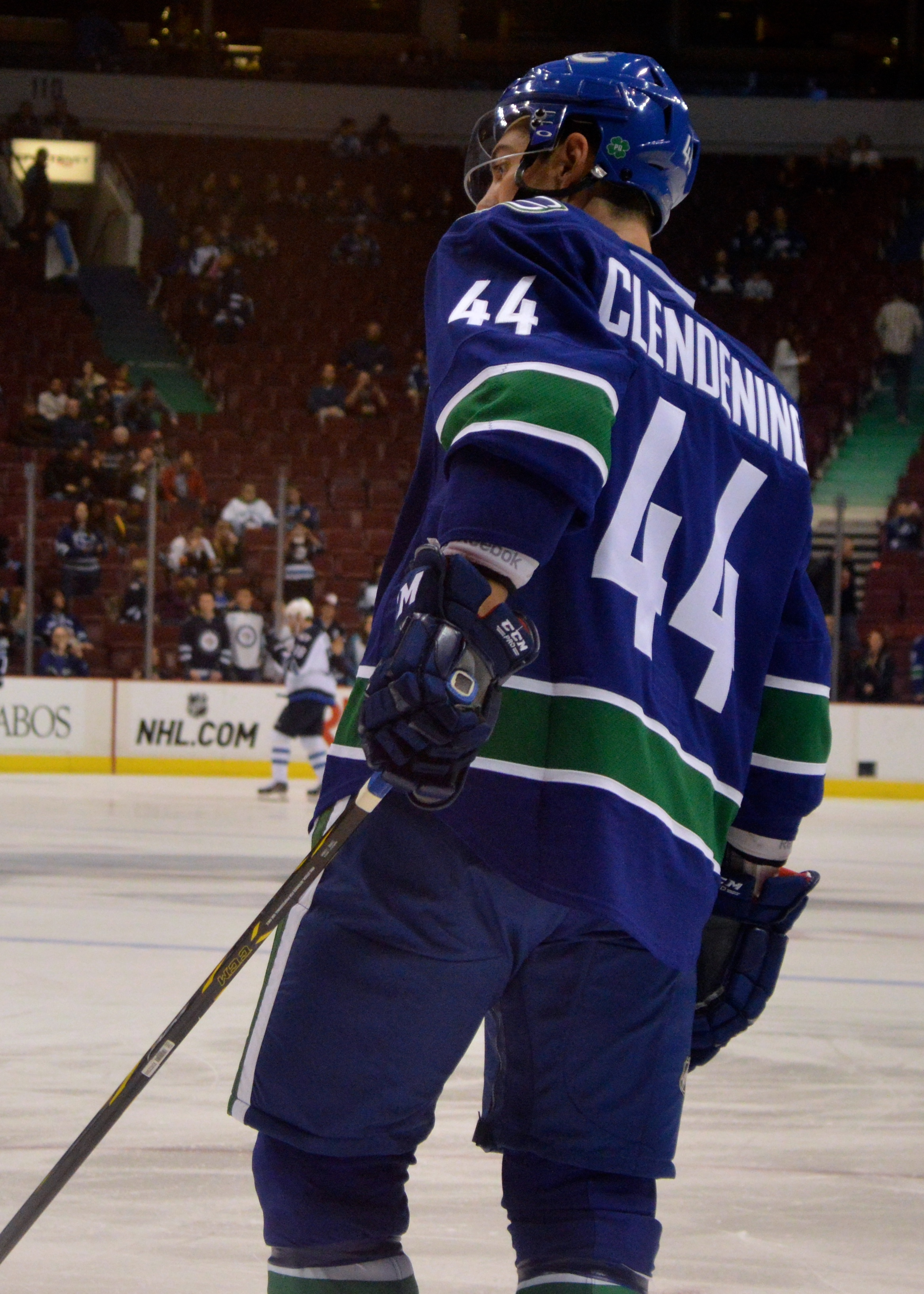
Clendening with the Canucks in February 2015

On January 29, 2015, the Blackhawks traded Clendening to the Vancouver Canucks in exchange for Gustav Forsling. Clendening finished out the season appearing in 17 games for the Canucks, as well as 11 games for the Utica Comets.

==== Pittsburgh Penguins ====
On July 28, 2015, Clendening, along with Nick Bonino and a 2nd-round pick in the 2016 NHL Entry Draft were traded from the Canucks to the Pittsburgh Penguins in exchange for Brandon Sutter and a 3rd-round pick in the 2016 NHL Entry Draft. Clendening made the Penguins roster to open the 2015–16 season, and would appear in 9 games for the club, as well as 6 for the Wilkes-Barre/Scranton Penguins.

==== Anaheim Ducks and Edmonton Oilers ====
On January 16, 2016, Clendening was included in yet another trade, being sent to the Anaheim Ducks alongside David Perron in exchange for Carl Hagelin. However, Clendening's time with the Ducks was short-lived, as he was claimed off waivers by the Edmonton Oilers two weeks later on January 27. This marked the fifth organization Clendening would join within the year, though he never actually played a game whilst with the Ducks. Clendening skated in 20 games for the Oilers, recording 1 goal and 6 points.

==== New York Rangers ====
On July 1, 2016, Clendening signed as a free agent to a one-year, two-way contract with the New York Rangers. Clendening appeared in 31 games for the Rangers, scoring 11 points.

==== Arizona Coyotes and return to Chicago ====
On July 1, 2017, Clendening signed a one-year, one-way contract as a free agent with the Arizona Coyotes. Having made the Coyotes opening night roster for the 2017–18 season, Clendening only appeared in 5 games for the team before he was placed on waivers and reassigned to play 21 games for the Tucson Roadrunners of the AHL.

On January 10, 2018, Clendening, alongside Anthony Duclair was traded to the Blackhawks in exchange for Richard Pánik and Laurent Dauphin, returning to Chicago for a second stint. He was immediately assigned to play out the remainder of the season with the Rockford IceHogs of the AHL.

==== Columbus Blue Jackets ====
As a free agent from the Blackhawks, Clendening left to sign a one-year, two-way contract with the Columbus Blue Jackets on July 1, 2018. He began the 2018–19 season on the Blue Jackets opening night roster, featuring in 4 games before he was placed on waivers and reassigned to AHL affiliate, the Cleveland Monsters. Leading the Monsters blueline in scoring, Clendening posted 4 goals and 37 points in 45 games, before he was recalled by Columbus to add depth for the playoffs. He made his NHL playoff debut with the Blue Jackets, appearing in game 3 of the Eastern Conference Quarterfinals against the Tampa Bay Lightning. He went on to collect an assist in 7 games before ending his season in the Conference Semifinals to the Boston Bruins.

On June 25, 2019, Clendening was re-signed to a two-year $1.4 million contract extension with the Columbus Blue Jackets.

==== Philadelphia Flyers ====
Following his third season within the Blue Jackets organization, Clendening left as a free agent and secured a one-year, two-way contract with the Philadelphia Flyers for the 2021–22 season on July 28, 2021.

==== Return to Rockford and trade to Hartford ====
On July 18, 2022, Clendening signed a one-year AHL contract to return to the IceHogs for the 2022–23 season, his third stint with the club. Clendening posted 3 goals and 24 points through 48 games to co-lead in scoring from the blueline for the IceHogs. In the aftermath of the Patrick Kane trade between the Blackhawks and Rangers, Clendening was traded at the AHL level to the Rangers AHL affiliate, the Hartford Wolf Pack, in exchange for Zach Jordan on February 28, 2023.

== International play ==
After a number of injuries hamstrung Team USA's under-18 roster, Clendening was called up from the under-17 team for the 2009 IIHF World U18 Championships in Minnesota. He appeared in seven championship games, putting up two assists as Team USA defeated Russia 5–0 to win a dark horse gold medal.

== Career statistics ==
=== Regular season and playoffs ===
			Regular season					Playoffs
Season	Team	League	GP	G	A	Pts	PIM	GP	G	A	Pts	PIM
2008–09	U.S. NTDP U17	USDP	15	1	5	6	18	—	—	—	—	—
2008–09	U.S. NTDP U18	USDP	13	1	5	6	14	—	—	—	—	—
2008–09	U.S. NTDP U18	NAHL	34	0	9	9	38	—	—	—	—	—
2009–10	U.S. NTDP Juniors	USHL	26	4	13	17	44	—	—	—	—	—
2009–10	U.S. NTDP U18	USDP	39	10	22	32	76	—	—	—	—	—
2010–11	Boston University	HE	39	5	21	26	80	—	—	—	—	—
2011–12	Boston University	HE	38	4	29	33	64	—	—	—	—	—
2012–13	Rockford IceHogs	AHL	73	9	37	46	67	—	—	—	—	—
2013–14	Rockford IceHogs	AHL	74	12	47	59	64	—	—	—	—	—
2014–15	Rockford IceHogs	AHL	38	1	12	13	20	—	—	—	—	—
2014–15	Chicago Blackhawks	NHL	4	1	1	2	2	—	—	—	—	—
2014–15	Vancouver Canucks	NHL	17	0	2	2	8	—	—	—	—	—
2014–15	Utica Comets	AHL	11	1	4	5	28	23	3	5	8	26
2015–16	Pittsburgh Penguins	NHL	9	0	1	1	10	—	—	—	—	—
2015–16	Wilkes-Barre/Scranton Penguins	AHL	6	0	3	3	0	—	—	—	—	—
2015–16	Edmonton Oilers	NHL	20	1	5	6	10	—	—	—	—	—
2016–17	New York Rangers	NHL	31	2	9	11	17	—	—	—	—	—
2017–18	Arizona Coyotes	NHL	5	0	2	2	2	—	—	—	—	—
2017–18	Tucson Roadrunners	AHL	21	1	4	5	40	—	—	—	—	—
2017–18	Rockford IceHogs	AHL	38	4	26	30	48	13	1	13	14	8
2018–19	Columbus Blue Jackets	NHL	4	0	0	0	0	7	0	1	1	2
2018–19	Cleveland Monsters	AHL	45	4	33	37	98	—	—	—	—	—
2019–20	Cleveland Monsters	AHL	55	7	34	41	75	—	—	—	—	—
2020–21	Cleveland Monsters	AHL	9	1	3	4	6	—	—	—	—	—
2021–22	Lehigh Valley Phantoms	AHL	74	5	37	42	78	—	—	—	—	—
2022–23	Rockford IceHogs	AHL	48	3	21	24	51	—	—	—	—	—
2022–23	Hartford Wolf Pack	AHL	20	1	8	9	16	6	2	0	2	24
2023–24	Ilves	Liiga	40	8	20	28	41	5	0	3	3	10
2024–25	Kunlun Red Star	KHL	61	5	17	22	65	—	—	—	—	—
2025–26	Shanghai Dragons	KHL	66	3	29	32	70	—	—	—	—	—
2026–27	Cleveland Monsters	AHL	1	0	1	1	2	—	—	—	—	—
NHL totals			90	4	20	24	49	7	0	1	1	2
KHL totals			127	8	46	54	135	—	—	—	—	—

Medal record

Representing United States

Ice hockey

World Championships
Bronze medal – third place	2021 Latvia	

IIHF World U18 Championships
Gold medal – first place	2009 United States	
Gold medal – first place	2010 Belarus	

=== International ===
Year	Team	Event	Result	GP	G	A	Pts	PIM
2009	United States	U17	3rd place, bronze medalist(s)	6	1	3	4	4
2009	United States	U18	1st place, gold medalist(s)	7	0	2	2	4
2010	United States	U18	1st place, gold medalist(s)	7	3	7	10	4
2012	United States	WJC	7th	6	1	4	5	6
2021	United States	WC	3rd place, bronze medalist(s)	7	2	3	5	2
Junior totals				26	5	16	21	18
Senior totals				7	2	3	5	2

== Awards and honors ==
Award	Year
College
All-Hockey East Rookie Team	2010–11
All-Hockey East First Team	2011–12
AHL
Second All-Star Team	2012–13
First All-Star Team	2013–14
International
IIHF World U18 Championships All-Star Team	2010
IIHF World U18 Championships Best Plus/Minus	2010
IIHF World U18 Championships Most Points by Defenseman	2010
IIHF World U18 Championships Top 3 Player on Team	2010
