= Altschuler =

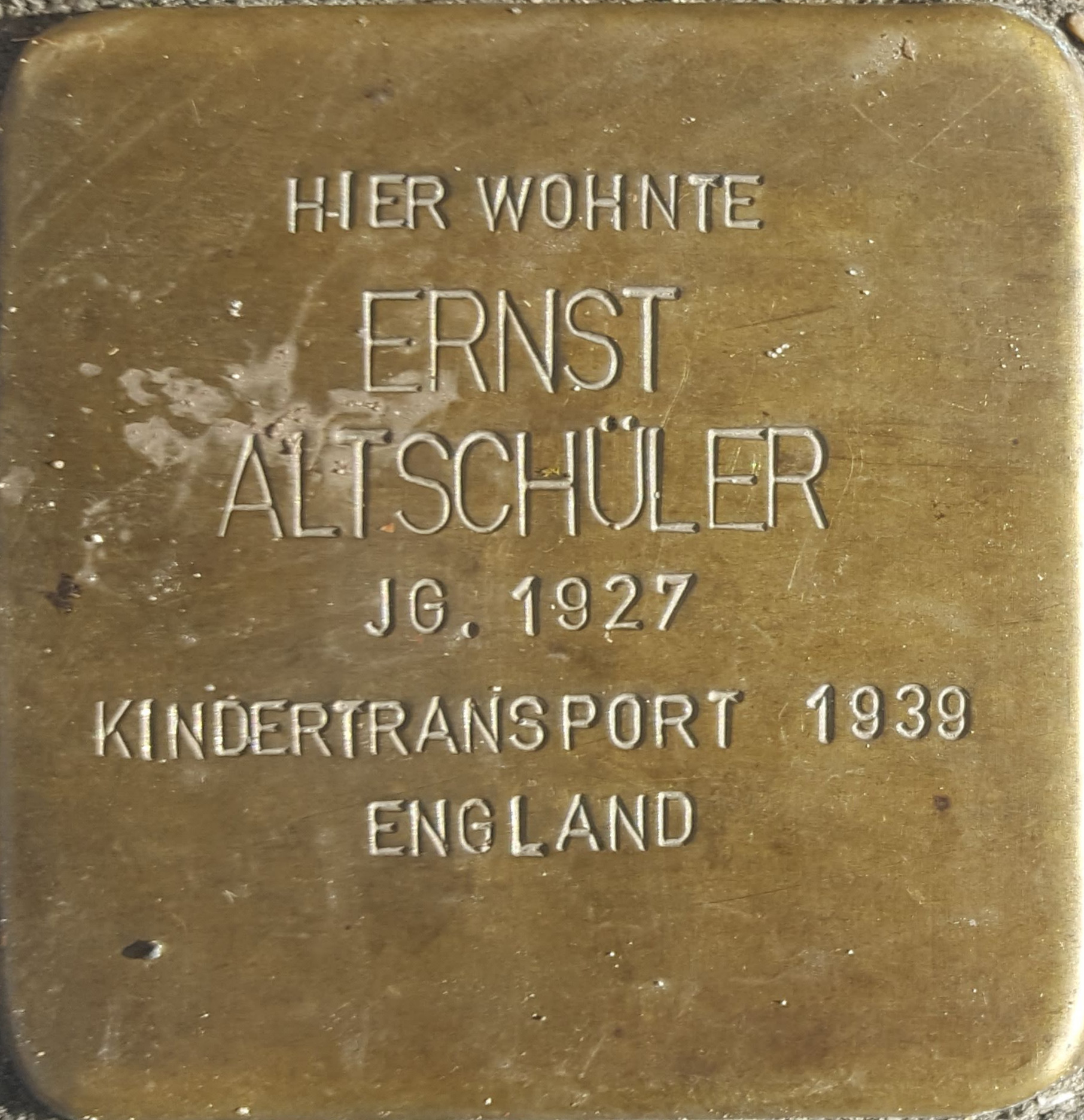
Stumble Stone for Ernst Altschüler in Frankfurt

Altschuler, Altshuler, Altschuller (Russian: Альтшуллер), Altshuller (Russian: Альтшуллер), Altschueler, Altshueler, or Alschuler is a Jewish surname of Ashkenazi origin. It is derived from the Altschul, Old Synagogue in Prague and dates back to at least the 15th century. After the 1542 explusion of the Jews from Prague, Altschulers settled in countries such as Lithuania, Poland, and Russia. Today, not all people with the surname Altschuler are necessarily direct descendants from the Jews of Prague.

In English, the surname literally translates to "from the old school" or "from the old synagogue" and was used to indicate pupils and instructors of the Jewish religion. The agentive suffix -er was added to altschul to form the surname.

Notable people with the surname include:

== Alschuler ==
- Alfred S. Alschuler (1876–1940), American architect
- George W. Alschuler (1864–1936), American politician and businessman
- Daniel R. Altschuler (b. 1944), Uruguayan physicist
- Samuel Alschuler (1859–1939), federal judge on the United States Court of Appeals
- The Alschulers, an American political family

See also:

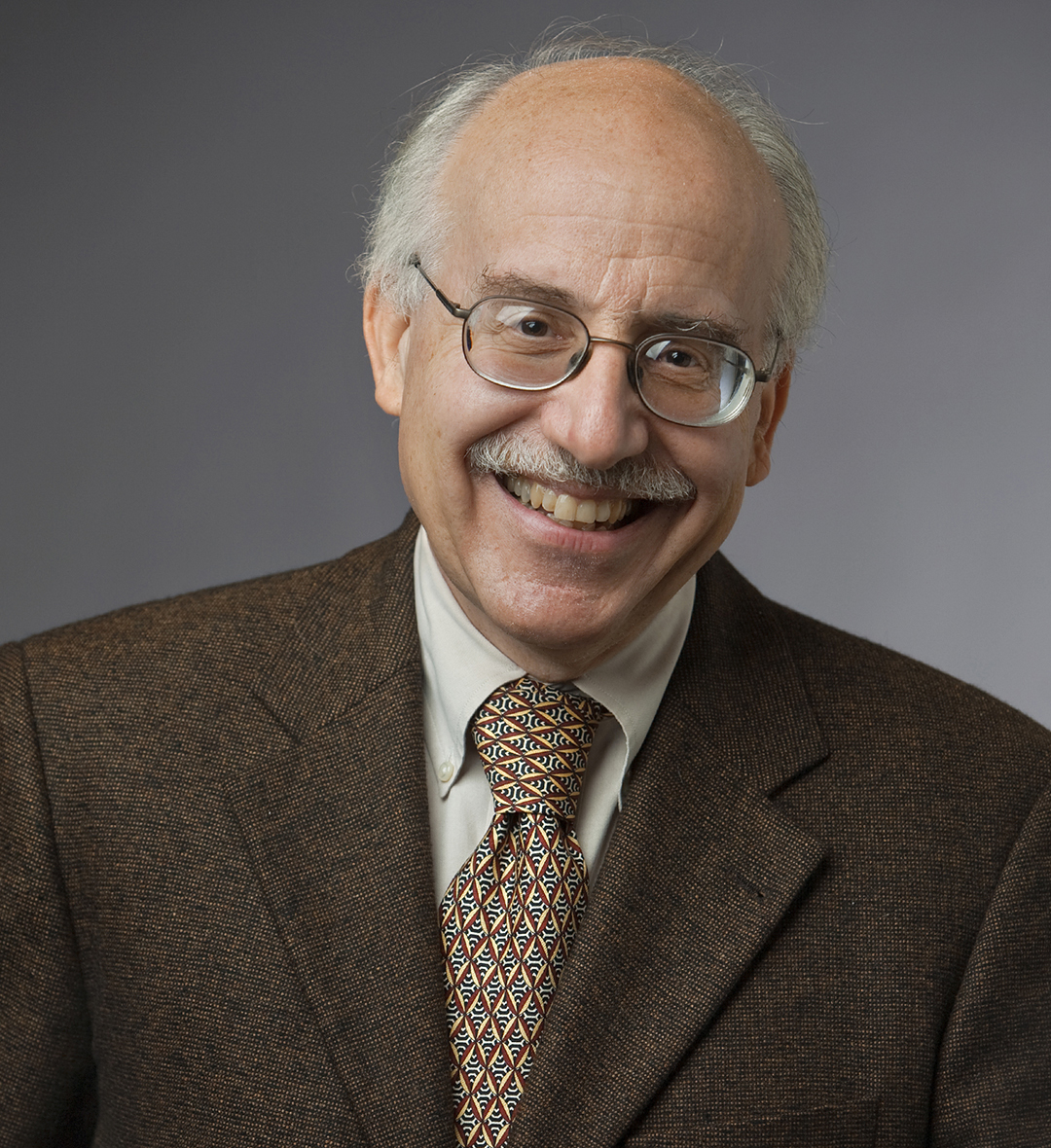
Glenn C. Altschuler, American historian and university administrator

== Altschuler ==
- Adi Altschuler (born 1986), Israeli educator
- David Altschuler (1687–1769), rabbi and Bible commentator
- Franz Altschuler (1923–2009), German artist and illustrator
- Glenn Altschuler, American writer and university-level educator and administrator
- John Altschuler (born 1963), American television and film producer and writer
- Modest Altschuler (1873–1963), Belarusian-American cellist, orchestral conductor, and composer
- Naphtali Hirsch Altschuler (16th–17th centuries), Talmudic scholar and writer
- Samuel Altshuler (1864–1956) Washington state and California businessman
- Vladimir Altschuler (born 1946), Russian orchestral conductor

See also:

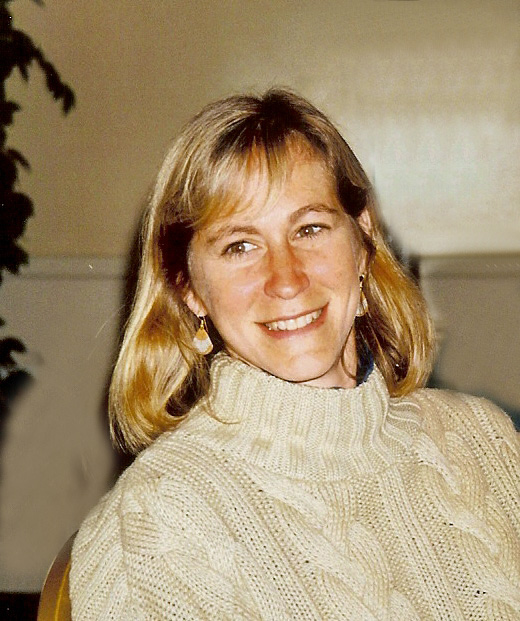
Dr. Lori Altshuler, psychiatrist

== Altshuler ==
- Alan Altshuler, American academic and government official, professor of urban policy and planning
- Boris Altshuler (born 1955), Russian-American physicist
- Lev Altshuler (1913–2003), Russian physicist, father of Boris
- David Altshuler (curator), American Judaic scholar and museum curator
- David Altshuler (physician), American clinical endocrinologist and human geneticist
- Herbert Altshuler, American major general
- Lori L. Altshuler, American scientist
- Mor Altshuler, Israeli scholar
- Semen Altshuler (1911–1983), Soviet physicist

See also:

== Altshuller ==
- Genrich Altshuller (1926–1998), Soviet engineer, inventor and scientist, journalist and writer

See also:

== Altshiller ==
- Debra Altschiller (born 1968), American politician
- Nathan Altshiller Court (1881–1968), Polish–American mathematician

== See also ==
- Altschul / Altshul
