= Simone and Malcolm Collins =

American pronatalist advocates

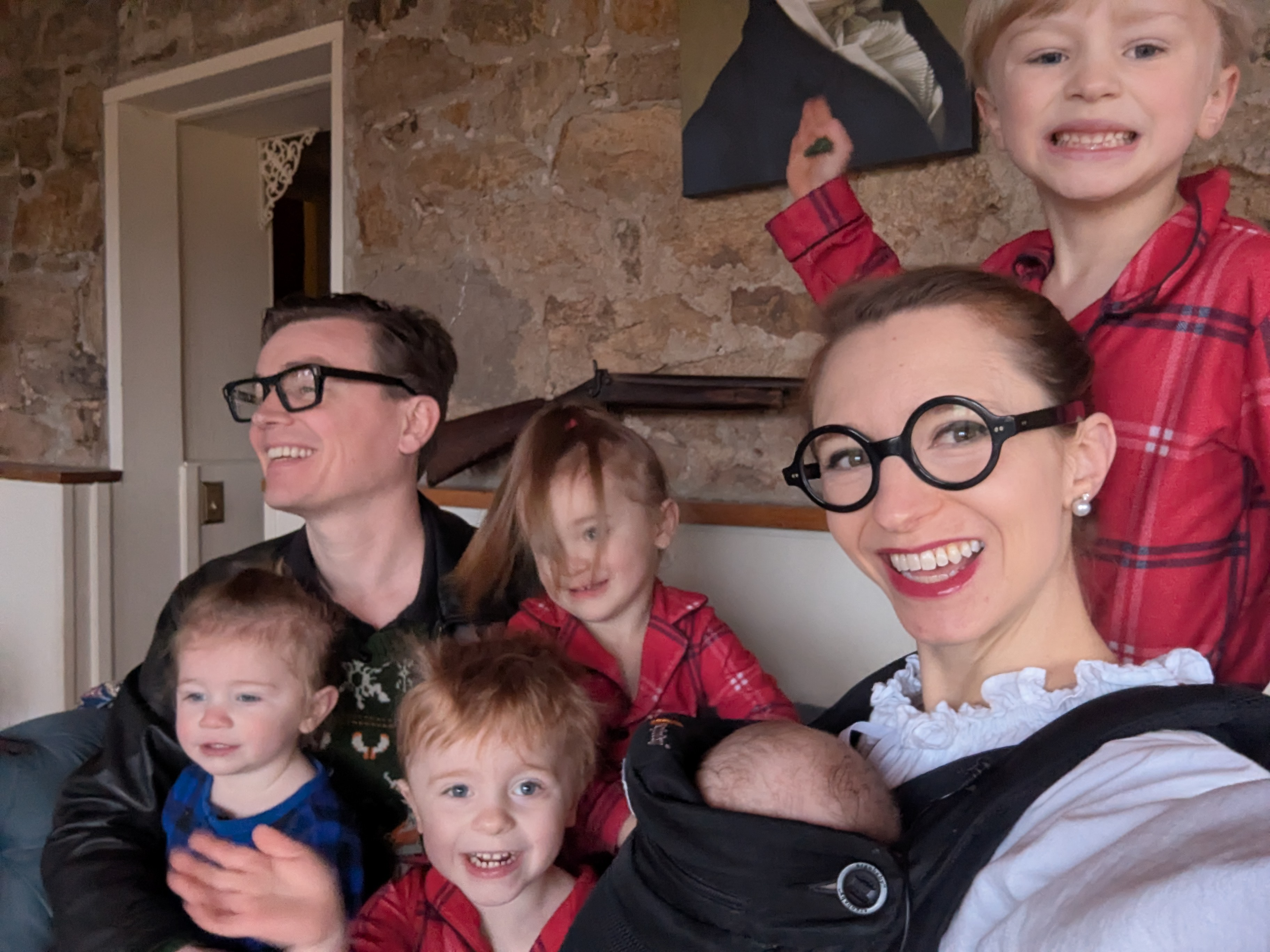
- The Collins family in 2026
- Born: Malcolm James Collins; 1986 (age 39–40); Dallas, Texas, U.S.
- Education: University of St Andrews; Stanford Graduate School of Business
- Born: Simone Haruko Smith; 1987 (age 38–39); Japan
- Education: George Washington University; University of Cambridge
- Known for: Pronatalism
- Notable work: Based Camp, The Pragmatist's Guide to Governance
- Children: 5
- Website: pronatalist.org

Simone Haruko Collins (née Smith; born 1987) and Malcolm James Collins (born 1986) are a married couple known primarily for their views and advocacy related to pronatalism, a stance encouraging higher birth rates and expressing concerns about demographic decline and its implications on society and the economy. They also host the podcast Based Camp, a predominantly conservative podcast.

== Career ==
Simone and Malcolm Collins previously worked in venture capital and technology sectors. Simone previously served as the managing director for Dialog, a secretive invite-only social club co-founded by investor Peter Thiel. Malcolm previously worked as a venture capitalist at TheVentures in South Korea. The Collinses are currently the managing directors of the corporate wholesale travel agency Travelmax.

The couple has written five books in their Pragmatist Guide series. Their book The Pragmatist's Guide to Governance: From high school cliques to boards, family offices, and nations: A guide to optimizing governance models was briefly on the Wall Street Journal Bestseller List in 2023.

=== Pronatalism advocacy ===
The Collinses are prominent figures within the pronatalist movement, which advocates for higher birth rates as a means to address demographic and economic challenges. They are the founders of Pronatalist.org, a non-profit initiative aimed at promoting and supporting high birth rates.

The Collinses fear that low fertility rates, especially among people they view as high-achieving, could lead to a decline in innovation and societal progress as well as the extinction of cultures, economic breakdown, and the collapse of civilization. They are part of a network of self-styled “elites,” that include billionaires like Elon Musk, who publicly express concerns about demographic trends leading to population collapse. They have been featured in discussions about their use of preimplantation genetic testing to select embryos. The Collinses are vocal supporters of using advanced reproductive technologies, including in vitro fertilisation and genetic screening, to promote higher birth rates and advocate for selecting embryos based on perceived desirable traits, such as high IQ. The Collinses' views have been criticised as promoting eugenics. In 2023, they were speakers at the controversial Natal Conference in Austin, Texas which featured speakers connected to far-right eugenicists. They have "scoffed at the idea that they were eugenicists" and have strongly disavowed any form of racism. Regardless, the couple appear to have embraced the label "hipster eugenicists."

=== Political views and involvement ===
Simone ran as a Republican for the 150th District in the Pennsylvania House of Representatives elections in 2024, losing by 17.5%.

The Collinses do not support gender-affirming care for youth, but express acceptance for people whom Simone described as "legit trans" as opposed to those who fall into the "trans cult." Simone opposes allowing transgender students to use bathrooms corresponding to their gender identity and to play on sports teams matching their gender identity.

In the 2024 US presidential election, the Collinses supported the Republican ticket of Donald Trump and JD Vance.

On the issue of firearms, Simone Collins has described herself as "very pro-gun."

== Personal lives ==
Malcolm is the great-grandson of Carr Collins Sr., founder of the Fidelity Union Life Insurance Company, and grandson of James M. Collins, a Dallas, Texas businessman and politician. In 1997, Malcolm's parents undertook a contentious divorce and custody dispute; the proceedings were characterized by one judge as "extensive, bitter and long-lasting". During the divorce, Malcolm was ordered to live at a private boarding school funded by a family trust. The divorce was finalized in 2001. It was discovered in 2021, upon the death of James Collins's wife Dorothy Dann Collins Torbert, that some $29 million had been embezzled from the family trust fund by Barbara Chalmers, the family bookkeeper. Reflecting on his childhood, Malcolm noted that he has "no beef with my parents. My childhood was hard, but my adulthood has been easy. Can I say a parent did a bad job if I’m happy with my life today? I don’t think so."

Simone was born in Japan as a self-described "mistake baby" and the only child to a failed polyamorous marriage. At some point in her life, Simone experienced eating disorders that gave her fertility issues.

=== Marriage and children ===
The Collinses married after Malcolm proposed on Reddit in 2013. They live in Audubon, Pennsylvania.

The Collinses have stated that they plan to have seven to thirteen children total. As of 2025, they have five children. The Collinses refuse to give their daughters traditionally feminine names, because they believe social research shows that women with feminine names are taken less seriously. Beginning with their third child, the Collinses have used preimplantation genetic testing during in vitro fertilisation to select embryos with a desirable genetic makeup. The Collinses claim that every decision they make is backed by data. The Collinses also employ corporal punishment in disciplining their children, which is based on Simone's personal observation of lions and tigers during a safari trip, despite clinical consensus that it impairs childhood development.

=== Religious beliefs ===
In 2024, the Collinses stated they were atheists, and at the time were promulgating a theological worldview they called "Techno-Puritanism" which they described as an "intentionally constructed religion, technically atheist". However, by 2025, they stated that "the belief that God is a real entity that actually exists at a different point in time ... is just so core to our worldview". They base Techno-Puritanism on the book The Martyrdom of Man by William Winwood Reade as well as the Bible; they consider both of these works divinely inspired scripture.
