= Altschul =

Altschul or Altshul is a Jewish surname of Ashkenazi origin. It is derived from the Altschul, Old Synagogue in Prague.

Notable people with the surname include:

- Andrew Foster Altschul, American novelist
- Annie Altschul (1919–2001), British nursing administrator
- Arthur Altschul (1920–2002), American banker
- Barry Altschul (born 1943), American jazz drummer
- Eleazar Altschul (died between 1632 and 1638), Jewish editor and writer
- Frank Altschul (1887–1981), American banker
- Louis V. Arco (born Lutz Altschul, 1899–1975), Austrian-born American actor
- Moses Altschul (c. 1546–1633), Writer
- Patricia Altschul (born 1941), American socialite, art collector, and television personality
- Randi Altschul (born 1960), American inventor
- Serena Altschul (born 1970), American broadcast journalist
- Stephen Altschul (born 1957), American mathematician
- Joseph Altschul (1839–1908), Hazzan, improvisor of Jewish songs

Altshul is the surname of

- Elena Altshul (also spelled Altsjoel or Altchoul; born 1964), Soviet draughts player, women's world draughts champion

== See also ==
- Siri von Reis (1931–2021), American botanist, author and poet, whose standard botanical abbreviation is Altschul
- Altschuler (and variants), surname
