= Altov =

Altov is a Russian pen name. shortened form of Altshuller . Notable people with the surname include:

- Genrikh Altov, pen name of Genrich Altshuller (1926–1998), Soviet engineer, inventor, and writer
- Semyon Altov (born 1945), Russian comedy writer
