= Kenneth Z. Altshuler =

American psychiatrist and psychoanalyst (1929–2021)

- Born: April 11, 1929; Paterson, New Jersey, U.S.
- Died: January 6, 2021 (aged 91); Dallas, Texas, U.S.
- Known for: Pioneering in studying mentally ill patients with deafness and advancing mental health care in Dallas
- Spouse: Ruth Sharp Altshuler
- Scientific career
- Fields: Deaf mental health care, Geriatric psychiatry, Psychoanalysis
- Workplaces: Columbia University; UT Southwestern Medical Center

Kenneth Z. Altshuler (April 11, 1929 – January 6, 2021) was an American psychiatrist and psychoanalyst. He was a Professor Emeritus of Psychiatry and the Chairman of the Department of Psychiatry at the University of Texas Southwestern Medical Center in Dallas.

== Early life and education ==
Kenneth Z. Altshuler was born on April 11, 1929, in Paterson, New Jersey, to Jacob and Altie Altshuler. He graduated from Cornell University in 1948 and received his M.D. degree from the University at Buffalo, School of Medicine in 1952, at age 23.

He did an internship at Kings County Hospital Center. From 1953–1955, he served in the Navy leaving the service with the rank of Lt. (J.G.) in the Medical Corps. After the military service, he underwent a specialty training in psychiatry and psychoanalysis at Columbia University Center for Psychoanalytic Training and Research.

== Career ==
In 1973, Altshuler joined the Columbia University faculty where he focused on the research of mental illnesses among deaf patients and in geriatric psychiatry. From 1973–1977, he managed undergraduate education in psychiatry at Columbia University's College of Physicians and Surgeons in New York. In 1977, he left Columbia University and moved to Texas. He became the chairman of the Department of Psychiatry at UT Southwestern Medical Center in Dallas.

There, he expanded the faculty from five to over one hundred full-time physicians and raising fifty-two million dollars in departmental endowments, including funds for ten chairs and two research centers. He retired in 2019, and was appointed a Professor Emeritus of Psychiatry.

He served as a director of the National Board of Medical Examiners, as a president of the American Association of Chairs of Departments of Psychiatry in 1990–1991, as a board member and later, in 1996, a president of the American Board of Psychiatry and Neurology. In 1999, he was appointed to the board of the Texas Department of Mental Health and Mental Retardation, by then-Governor George W. Bush, and served for five years. He also served on the boards and advisory boards of the local psychiatric and charity organizations.

== Personal life ==
He had three children from his first marriage, Steven L. Altshuler, Lori L. Altshuler and Dara Altshuler, and six grandchildren. In 1987, he married Ruth Collins Sharp, an American philanthropist. He and his wife were known for their civic engagement in Dallas and philanthropic activities in North Texas, including to UT Southwestern.

After his wife died in 2017, he established a fund at UT Southwestern, the Ruth & Ken Altshuler Fund for Clinical Psychiatry and the Kenneth Z. Altshuler Fund for Psychiatric Education, to support clinical research and education programs related to mental illness.

Altshuler died from complications of COVID-19 on January 6, 2021, during the COVID-19 pandemic in Texas.

== Awards and honors ==
- Merit Award of the National Psychological Association for Psychoanalysis
- Honorary Doctorate of Science from the Gallaudet College for the Deaf
- Certificate of Special Achievement by the American Psychiatric Association for contribution to the program for the deaf in New York
- Certificate of Special Recognition by the American Psychiatric Association for contribution to the Community Mental Health program in Dallas
- Distinguished Alumnus Award of the University of Buffalo School of Medicine
- Trail Blazer Award by the Dallas Community Mental Health Center
- Wilson Award in Geriatric Psychiatry
- Psychiatric Excellence Award from the Texas Society of Psychiatric Physicians
- Texas Star Award from the Texas Mental Health Association
- Outstanding Psychiatric Award from the North Texas Society of Psychiatric Physicians
- Prism Award from the Dallas Mental Health Association
- The Psychiatric Out-Patient Clinic of Dallas Community Mental Health Center is named in his honor
- The Psychiatric Unit of Zale Lipshy Pavilion is named in his honor
- The Callier Center for Communication Disorders at University of Texas at Dallas established an annual award bearing his name – the Ruth and Ken Altshuler Callier Care Award
- The Metrocare Services established a research center bearing his name – the Altshuler Center for Education and Research
- Dallas County Mental Health and Mental Retardation renamed one of its clinics in his honor – the Kenneth Z. Altshuler Mental Health Clinic
- Exemplary Psychiatrist Award from the National Alliance on Mental Illness

== See also ==
- Ruth Sharp Altshuler
- Lori L. Altshuler
