= Art Paul =

American graphic designer (1925–2018)

- Born: January 18, 1925; Chicago, Illinois, United States
- Died: April 28, 2018 (aged 93); Lake View, Chicago, Illinois, United States
- Education: School of the Art Institute of Chicago
- Occupation: Graphic designer
- Spouse: Suzanne Seed (m. 1975)

Arthur Paul (January 18, 1925 – April 28, 2018) was an American graphic designer and the founding art director of Playboy magazine. During his time at Playboy, he commissioned illustrators and artists, including Andy Warhol, Salvador Dalí, and James Rosenquist, as part of the illustration liberation movement.

In addition to being an art director and graphic designer — in particular of Playboy's rabbit logo — Art Paul was an illustrator, fine artist, curator, writer, and composer. There has been a surge of recent interest concerning both Art's past and present, with recent talks, books, exhibitions, and a documentary being made about him. At 91 years old, he put his drawings and writings into book form, creating projects focused on race, aging, animals, and graphic whimsy.

== Early life and education ==
Paul was born on January 18, 1925, in the Southwest Side of Chicago. His family later moved to Rogers Park area on the north side. There, while attending Roger C. Sullivan High School, an art teacher recognized that he was talented enough to earn a scholarship at the School of the Art Institute of Chicago, which he attended from 1940 to 1943. After World War II service in the Army Air Corps, he attended the Institute of Design, known as the "Chicago Bauhaus" and now part of Illinois Institute of Technology, where he studied with László Moholy-Nagy.

"For Paul — student at the Institute of Design, commonly called the Chicago Bauhaus — Playboy was a laboratory for producing a model of contemporary magazine design and illustration ... Paul helped create a forum that demolished artistic and cultural boundaries. In doing so, he transformed magazine illustration." — Steven Heller, an American design critic.

== Playboy magazine ==
Playboy rabbit logo.

Paul was working as a freelance graphic designer and illustrator in a small office on Van Buren Street next to the Chicago "L" tracks when in 1953 he was contacted by Hugh Hefner. Hefner needed an art director for a magazine he was developing, and learned of Paul through a mutual acquaintance. At the time, Hefner planned to call the magazine "Stag Party." The initial dummy, designed by cartoonist Arv Miller, resembled movie star/screen magazines of the time. Hefner wanted a different, more innovative and sophisticated look. Together, Paul and Hefner created the first issue of Playboy, with Paul creating the look of the magazine.

"I at first hesitated to accept [Hugh Hefner's] offer. For as a freelancer I had the best clients one could in Chicago. So I freelanced the first few issues. What convinced me to accept was that I was promised freedom to buy the kind of art most illustrators couldn't sell in 1953, the personal visions that lay closest to their hearts. I told illustrators I don't want 'commercial' art. I want the kind you do to please yourself when you're not trying to get work in a magazine. At first they thought I was kidding. As for fine artists, I convinced them they would not be selling out to work for us but would reach a larger audience with their most authentic work."—Art Paul.

The name of the magazine was changed to Playboy shortly before the first issue went to print, after Hefner was threatened with a trademark dispute over the "Stag Party" name. The cartoon mascot designed by Miller, originally intended to be a stag, was quickly changed to a rabbit by replacing the head, although the stag's hoofs remained visible in the altered drawings. The magazine's famous rabbit-head logo with cocked ear and tuxedo bow tie was developed by Paul for Playboy's second issue. Initially intended as an endpoint for articles, Paul sketched the logo in about an hour. Soon, however, the decision was made to use the logo as the symbol of Playboy's corporate identity.

As Art Director, Paul supervised the design of the magazine for 30 years. Early on, he commissioned many local Chicago artists and photographers to illustrate the magazine. These included Franz Altschuler, Leon Bellin who illustrated Playboy's continuing 'Ribald Classic' feature, Roy Schnakenberg, Ed Paschke, Seymour Rosofsky, printmaker Mish Kohn and photographer Arthur Siegel.

During Paul's years at Playboy, the magazine won hundreds of awards for excellence in graphic design and illustration. Paul has been credited for helping create a revolution in illustration (what Print Magazine called the "Illustration Liberation Movement") by insisting that graphic design and illustration need not be "low" arts but could, when approached with integrity and emotional depth, and in a spirit of experimentation, be as "high" an art as any.

"Commercial artists usually look out for what the client is already doing or saying. I wasn't looking for that. I wanted the artists to express themselves... I wanted the painters and illustrators to give me what they did for themselves on Sunday. I didn't want them to pick out the line from the story they felt was the sexiest. I wanted their personal, authentic work."— Art Paul, 2015 AIGA interview

== Career after Playboy ==
After leaving Playboy in 1982, Paul did graphic design, posters, and logos for a number of clients in magazines, advertising, television and film. For the last ten years he concentrated primarily on drawing and painting, exhibiting most recently at the Chicago Cultural Center and at Columbia College in Chicago. He served on boards of the Chicago Museum of Contemporary Art, the Association of Art Curators in Chicago, and the Illinois Summer School of the Arts. As of 2014, he was working on two books of his drawings. Paul resided in Chicago. Paul was the subject of a talk at the Chicago Humanities Festival on November 1, 2014, given by graphic designer James Goggin, at which Paul and his wife Suzanne Seed were present.

== Legacy ==
A new exhibition at the Noyes Cultural Arts Center in Evanston, IL, titled Overheard Conversations with Myself: The Talking Sketchbooks of Art Paul will be shown March 22–May 22, 2020. Paul's wife, Suzanne, says of the exhibition, "Art's Talking Sketchbook has images whose accompanying words seemed to be the thoughts of the drawing itself, or words each drawing gave birth to just by breaking its bounds into quirky philosophies, squirrely meditations, and outrageously original mottos. these drawings are a glimpse into a mind that never paused in its playful and boundless creativity."

The Chicago-based gallery One After 909 exhibited Paul's "Race Face" collection from October 26–December 8, 2018.

Additionally, there are two books, Race Face and Talking Sketchbook, that are in the works. On his inspiration behind Race Face, Art Paul said, "Many of my drawings of heads aim to reveal how we are haunted by the projections other mask us with and use to deride us, how our self-images are altered by violence, paranoia, shame, and dread. So often we feel compelled to hide our authentic selves behind masks."

There is also an autobiography in progress with the working title Graphic Graphics: Art Paul's Advice to Young Designers Facing Difficult Clients, Art-Blind Editors, Exploding Technologies, Budget Trolls, and Sexual Revolutions.

== Awards ==
In 1980, Paul was elected a member of the Alliance Graphique Internationale. The Institute of Design, IIT, honored him with its professional achievement award in 1983, and in 1986 he was elected to the Hall of Fame of the Art Directors Club. He received the Herb Lubalin Lifetime Achievement Award from the Society of Publication Designers, and in 2008 was made a Fellow of the Chicago Chapter of the American Institute of Graphic Artists. The Society of Typographic Arts gave him a special award for outstanding achievement in trademark design for the Playboy rabbit head symbol. The Art Directors Club of Boston gave him an award for "inspiring, encouraging, and creating an outstanding showcase for contemporary artists". The Art Directors of Philadelphia awarded him the Polycube Award for "consistent excellence in communications". The City of Milan, Italy, awarded him its Gold Medal for the exhibition, Beyond Illustration. Art Direction Magazine gave Paul the first award in its publishing history for "interest and support of illustration and illustrators and the tremendous range of illustrative styles that run in Playboy magazine.

== Exhibitions ==
Title	Location	Dates
Art Paul: Inner Faces	Chicago Cultural Center	November 15, 1997 – January 18, 1998
The Manuscript Illuminated	Columbia College Chicago	March 16 – May 4, 2001
Head Games	Coda Gallery	March 14 – 26, 2015
Art Paul: Hard Heads, Sweet Knees, Forked Tongues	Ukrainian Institute of Modern Art	June 5 – July 26, 2015

=== International exhibitions ===
Paul organized many years of Playboy illustrations and special projects he had directed into the exhibition Beyond Illustration: The Art of Playboy, which toured museums in North America, Europe and Japan between 1971 and 1974. An updated version of the exhibition, The Art of Playboy: From the First 25 Years, opened at Chicago's Cultural Center in 1978, and toured North and South American museums and universities. The exhibitions included artists such as Andy Warhol, Larry Rivers, Salvador Dalí, LeRoy Neiman, James Rosenquist, and Tom Wesselmann. The Hyde Park Art Center hosted the 2004 exhibit I Read It for the Art: Chicago, Creativity, and Playboy, featuring Paul's works, along with the works of many of the Chicago artists he helped to establish.

== Books ==
Two books have been published on Paul's work,Vision: Art Paul, and The Art of Playboy surveying many years of his art direction at Playboy.

== Personal life and death ==
Paul married photographer-author-poet Suzanne Seed in 1975. Paul died on April 28, 2018, from complications of pneumonia in Lake View, Chicago, at the age of 93. Art had been previously married and has 2 sons, Bill and Fred.
