= Ruth Sharp Altshuler =

American philanthropist (1924–2017)

Ruth Collins Sharp Altshuler (1924 – December 8, 2017) was an American philanthropist living in Dallas, Texas. The Dallas Morning News wrote that she helped raise tens of millions of dollars for charity. Altshuler was the first woman to serve or chair several boards, including the Salvation Army Dallas Advisory Board, the board of Goodwill Industries, and the chair of the Board of Trustees of Southern Methodist University. She was also inducted into the Texas Woman's Hall of Fame.

== Early life ==
Altshuler grew up in a mansion with her two brothers and parents in Dallas. Her father, Carr Collins Sr., had founded the Fidelity Union Life Insurance Company in the 1920s. Altshuler graduated from Woodrow Wilson High School in Dallas, and spent her summers at an exclusive girls' camp in Texas Hill Country. One of her brothers, James M. Collins, would become a member of the United States Congress. She attended Southern Methodist University where she met her husband, a naval aviator, when she was a junior. They were married, but her first husband died in combat during World War II.

== Adulthood ==
Altshuler started working at Dallas Love Field and met her second husband, Charles S. Sharp, whom she married in 1947. While pregnant with the first of her three children, she looked into joining the Junior League. She started working in the Junior League the next year. In the Junior League, she saw people who were in need and she began to volunteer. Altshuler was inspired to do philanthropy because of her parents and also because of the ideas of Albert Schweitzer.

In 1960, she was appointed to head the woman's division of the 1960 Dallas County Community Chest Campaign. In 1974, she was the first woman to lead the Millionaires Chorus for the Salvation Army Christmas show.

When her brother, Jim Collins, ran for a Senate seat in 1982, she helped him with his campaign. She traveled across Texas to promote her brother's candidacy. She didn't like to talk about politics, and instead focused on the kind of person her brother was. Charles Sharp eventually was diagnosed with Parkinson's disease and died in 1984. Altshuler remarried to a physician, Ken Altshuler.

Altshuler helped form the Tocqueville Society in 1986 when she asked more than 100 friends to help her support the United Way. She and her friends raised $1 million and then formed the Tocqueville Society. In 1987, she was inducted into the Texas Woman's Hall of Fame and, in 1989, she was inducted as a member of the inaugural class of the Woodrow Wilson High School Hall of Fame.

In 1992, she personally donated $1 million to the United Way of Dallas. Also in 1992, she was a co-chair on the committee to recruit advisors to Ross Perot's presidential campaign. Altshuler was friends with Perot's wife.

In 2008, the Smithsonian Institution's Woodrow Wilson International Center for Scholars gave Altshuler their Award for Public Service. In 2013, she was in charge of planning the event commemorating the 50th anniversary of the assassination of John F. Kennedy.

== Death ==
Altshuler died on December 8, 2017, at age 93. She had suffered complications from a broken hip. Her memorial service was held on December 14 at the Highland Park Methodist Church.
