= Lady Lazarus (novel) =

2008 novel by Andrew Foster Altschul

Lady Lazarus is the first novel by O. Henry Award-winning writer Andrew Foster Altschul, published by Harcourt in 2008. Drawing its title from the poem of the same name by Sylvia Plath, Lady Lazarus also deals with themes similar to the poem, namely issues of exhibitionism and the public's hunger for tragedy and spectacle.

Described by Publishers Weekly as a "gleeful, difficult debut" with "razor-sharp cultural observations" and "some thrilling high dives", the novel's central story is that of Calliope Bird Morath, a young, renowned confessional poet "beloved to deconstructionists and culture theorists and fifteen year old girls alike."

== Plot ==
As an adult, Calliope has become one of the best-known poets in America. But she has also been famous since birth. She is the daughter of rock stars Brandt Morath and Penny Power, whose resemblance to Kurt Cobain and Courtney Love is underscored by Brandt's suicide at the height of his fame, while his daughter was still a small child. Unlike the real-life Frances Bean Cobain, Calliope is a presumed eyewitness to her father's death, an event that traumatizes her into not speaking for several years. When she does regain her voice, it is as a poet, and ultimately as the book's co-narrator (she shares the task with a music journalist who, in a post-modernist trope, bears the same name as the author).

== Style and critical reception ==
The novel is written as a literary pastiche of various forms of media, incorporating purported magazine interviews, academic articles, scripts from unaired television shows and even transcripts from psychoanalysis sessions. In the words of critic Kel Munger, this inventiveness is one of the book's key strengths:

"Altschul skewers everything from the contemporary graduate poetry workshop (which he’s obviously seen from the inside) to the way that the media (frantically) and academia (disingenuously) jump on the fame bandwagon. In between, there are delicious parodies of magnificent poems, including some by Sylvia Plath, Sexton, T. S. Eliot, Dylan Thomas, Charles Baudelaire, Frederico García Lorca (sic) … While it doesn’t take a graduate degree in English to follow, recognizing the allusions no doubt adds to the fun."

Another critic, Patrick Schabe, has asserted that the book's playfully discursive nature makes reviewing it problematic:

"Lady Lazarus presents the critic with a challenge: How to unpack and analyze the text that deconstructs itself? The feedback loop is total, and each gesture revealed to be recursive—every critique already anticipated and incorporated into the work itself."

Writing in Pop Matters, Shabe makes the observation that Altschul even anticipates that readers will note the similarity between the name "Andrew Foster Altschul" and that of David Foster Wallace; the author pointedly compounds this by introducing a (fictional) interview—between David Foster Wallace and Calliope Bird Morath—into the text. As Shabe concludes:

"Altschul plays both sides of the fence, pulling off tricks and then revealing the phoniness of the illusion with a wry smile. Rather than being all-too-academic, Lady Lazarus toys with these conventions in a commentary on the issue of their worth, and manages to reaffirm the role of story in the process."
