= Mosaic Dallas =

- Fidelity Union Life Insurance Building
- U.S. National Register of Historic Places
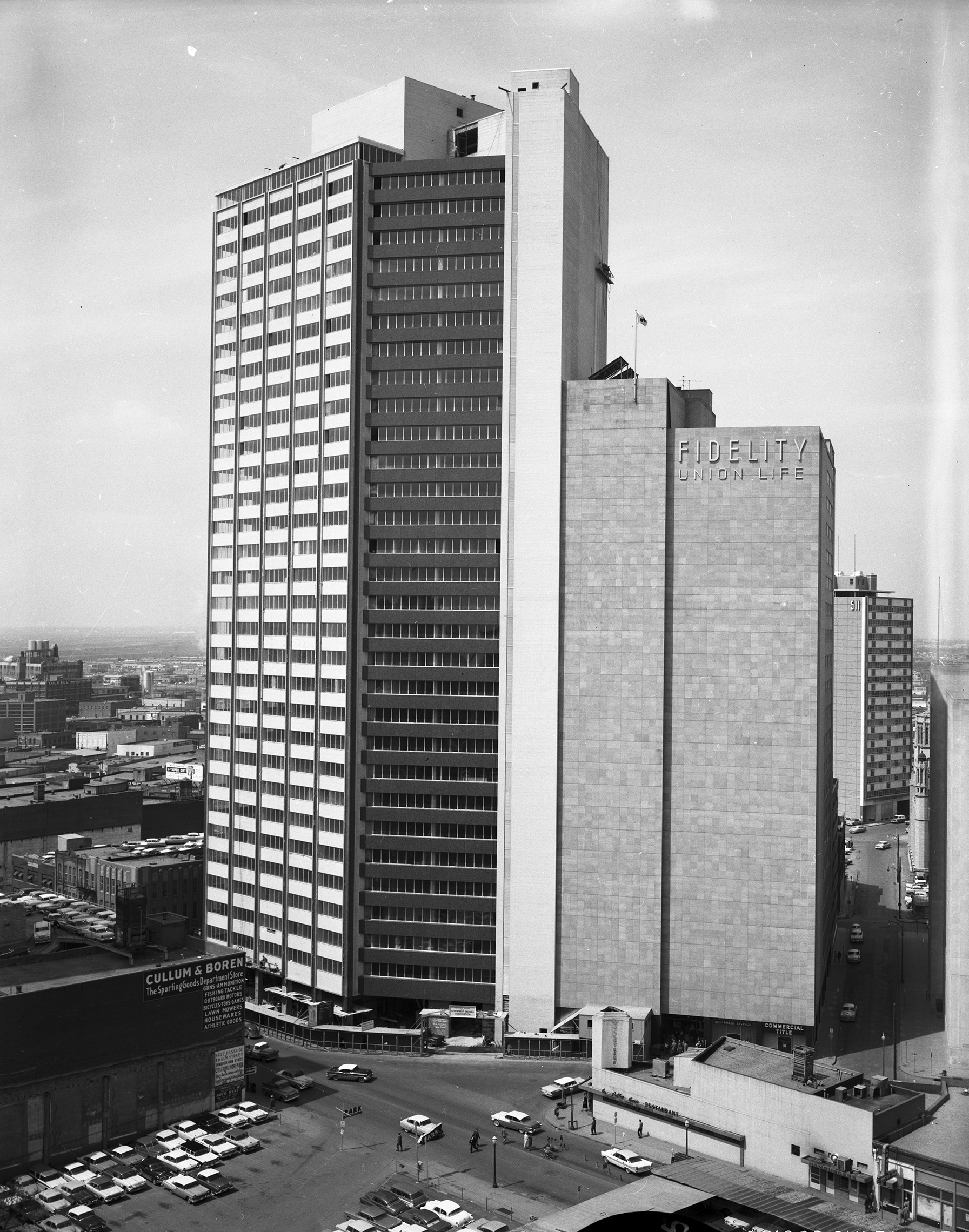
- Fidelity Union Building in about 1959

- Location within Texas Location within the United States
- Location: 1511 Bryan St. and 1507 Pacific Ave., Dallas, Texas
- Coordinates: 32°47′2″N 96°47′59″W
- Area: 1.2 acres (0.49 ha)
- Built: 1952
- Architect: Wyatt C. Hedrick, Nelson Stanley
- Architectural style: Modern Movement, Midcentury Modern
- Website: Mosaic Dallas
- NRHP reference No.: 09000306
- Added to NRHP: September 29, 2009

Mosaic Dallas, formerly Fidelity Union Life Insurance Building, is a residential development in the City Center District of downtown Dallas, Texas, United States, adjacent to Thanks-giving Square. The complex is located at 300 North Akard Street, across the street from DART's Akard Station, which serves its Blue, Red, Orange and Green light rail lines.

== History ==
The building was originally home to the Fidelity Union Life Insurance Company. The first tower was built in 1952 and is 21 stories tall while the second, 31-story addition was constructed between 1959 and 1960.

Fidelity Union vacated the complex in 1985 and Texas Power & Light (TXU), the other major tenant, moved out in 1992. The complex remained vacant until Hamilton Properties Corporation bought it in 2004, rechristening it as The Mosaic, in honor of the thousands of green tiles that line the buildings' facade. The renovation included construction of 440 apartments with interiors designed by three noted architects: Ike Isenhour, Stanley Ray, and MAA. The residences were opened to occupancy on 6 December 2007 and the ground floor featured a restaurant and fitness center.

The structure was listed on the National Register of Historic Places in 2009.

== In popular culture ==
- During the first few episodes of Dallas, the Fidelity Union Life building could be seen in the distance through a window while scenes played out regarding dealings and operations at oil/gas firm Ewing Oil.

== See also ==
- List of tallest buildings and structures in Dallas
- National Register of Historic Places listings in Dallas County, Texas
