= 1982 United States Senate election in Texas =

- November 2, 1982
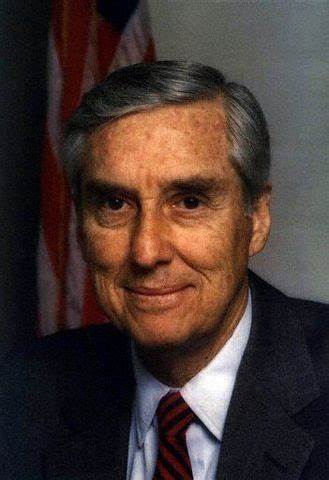

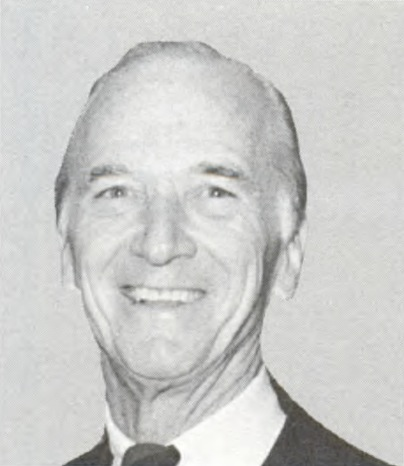
Nominee	Lloyd Bentsen	James M. Collins
Party	Democratic	Republican
Popular vote	1,818,223	1,256,759
Percentage	58.59%	40.50%
- County results Bentsen: 50–60% 60–70% 70–80% 80–90% Collins: 50–60% 60–70%
U.S. senator before election
Lloyd Bentsen
Democratic
Elected U.S. Senator
Lloyd Bentsen
Democratic

The 1982 United States Senate election in Texas took place on November 2, 1982. Incumbent Democratic U.S. Senator Lloyd Bentsen won re-election to a third term in office, defeating Republican U.S. Representative James M. Collins.

Bentsen's victory in the election was credited with producing a coattail effect that allowed Democrats to win in the concurrent gubernatorial election.

== Democratic primary ==
=== Candidates ===
- Lloyd Bentsen, incumbent U.S. Senator
- Joe Sullivan, minister and perennial candidate for U.S. Representative from San Antonio

=== Results ===
Democratic primary results
Party	Candidate	Votes	%
Democratic	Lloyd Bentsen (incumbent)	987,153	78.13%
Democratic	Joe Sullivan	276,314	21.87%
Total votes		1,263,467	100.00%

== Republican primary ==
=== Candidates ===
- James M. Collins, U.S. Representative from Dallas
- Walter H. Mengden, State Representation from Houston
- Don Richardson, electronics salesman from Houston

=== Results ===
Republican primary results
Party	Candidate	Votes	%
Republican	James M. Collins	152,469	58.00%
Republican	Walter H. Mengden	91,780	34.92%
Republican	Don Richardson	18,616	7.08%
Total votes		262,865	100.00%

== General election ==
=== Results ===
1982 United States Senate election in Texas
Party	Candidate	Votes	%	±%
Democratic	Lloyd Bentsen (incumbent)	1,818,223	58.59%	▲1.81
Republican	James M. Collins	1,256,759	40.50%	▼1.74
Libertarian	John E. Ford	23,494	0.76%	N/A
Citizens	Lineaus Hooper Lorette	4,564	0.15%	N/A
Write-in		127	0.00%	N/A
Total votes		3,103,167	100.00%	
Democratic hold				

== See also ==
- 1982 United States Senate elections

== Works cited ==
- Moreland, Laurence; Steed, Robert; Baker, Tod, eds. (1991). The 1988 Presidential Election in the South: Continuity Amidst Change in Southern Party Politics. Praeger Publishers. ISBN 0275931455.
