= Joe R. Pool =

American politician (1911–1968)

Joe Richard Pool
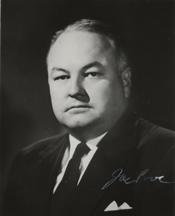

Member of the U.S. House of Representatives from Texas
- In office January 3, 1963 – July 14, 1968
- Preceded by: District created
- Succeeded by: James M. Collins
- Constituency: At-large (1963–67); 3rd district (1967–68)

Personal details
- Born: Joe Richard Pool; February 18, 1911 Fort Worth, Texas, U.S.
- Died: July 14, 1968 (aged 57) Houston, Texas, U.S.
- Cause of death: Heart attack
- Resting place: Laurel Land Memorial Park, Dallas, Texas, U.S.
- Party: Democratic
- Education: Southern Methodist University

Joe Richard Pool (February 18, 1911 – July 14, 1968) was an American politician who served as a U.S. representative from Texas. Pool represented all of Texas from January 3, 1963, until January 3, 1967 (when such districts in multi-district states were banned by the Supreme Court) and then from the western half of Dallas County, Texas, from January 3, 1967, until July 14, 1968.

== Early life and education ==
Joe Richard Pool was born in Fort Worth, Texas, on February 18, 1911 to William Wesley Pool and the former Bonnie Jean King. The Pool family moved to Dallas in 1913. In 1914 William Pool started a mattress manufacturing business named Direct Mattress. Pool attended school in Dallas, and graduated from Oak Cliff High School (now W.H. Adamson High School) in 1929. He attended the University of Texas from 1929 to 1933 majoring in pre-law and business. Pool was a member of the American Legion, Dallas and Texas Bar Associations, and was honored with a life membership in the Dallas Chamber of Commerce. He was a member of Pi Kappa Alpha fraternity and Phi Alpha Delta legal fraternity. His family were members of the Methodist Church. While serving as chairman of the Judiciary Council at the University of Texas, Pool began a lifelong friendship with Claudia Alta Taylor (Lady Bird Johnson), also a member of the council. In 1933, at the height of the Great Depression, Pool's finances forced him to withdraw from the university. He completed his legal education studying part-time at Southern Methodist University where he graduated in 1937. He was admitted to the Texas Bar and commenced the practice of law in Dallas with his partner J. Frank Wilson.

Pool moved back to Dallas in 1943 and had to put his law career on hold while he volunteered for duty in the U.S. Army Air Corps. He rose from the rank of private to staff technical sergeant by the end of World War II. He was in intelligence service mainly investigating military accidents for sabotage. Pool received an honorable discharge in 1945.

== Career ==
=== Pre-politics business career ===
After WWII Pool rejoined his law partner J. Frank Wilson in Dallas. In 1946 Pool managed Wilson's successful congressional campaign. At this time Pool also worked to expand his father's mattress business. In 1947 Pool took his experiences in helping his father's business and put them to work opening his own down comforter refurbishing company in Ennis, Texas. The business, Alden Comfort Mills, moved to Plano, Texas, in 1950. This helped financially support his political endeavors. In early 1959 Pool also tried his hand at Dallas real estate and later that year he dabbled in oil drilling in southeast Kentucky.

=== Texas House of Representatives ===
Joe Pool campaign slogan

Pool began his political career in 1952 by running for the District 51, Place 5 seat in the Texas House of Representatives from Dallas County. His first campaign for public office was a success. Pool was re-elected in 1954 and 1956.

During his service in the Texas legislature, Pool served on various committees of the House. For four years he was vice-chairman of the Insurance Committee and helped write much of the reform insurance legislation that is now incorporated in the Texas Insurance Code. He also served as chairman of the Motor Traffic Committee, Conservation and Reclamation Committee, and the House Investigating Committee.

While serving in the legislature, Pool co-authored the 1955 bill that created the Trinity River Authority. The goal of the Trinity River Authority bill was to study the feasibility of building a Trinity River canal from Dallas-Fort Worth to Galveston Bay from 1955 to 1974. During this time many of the citizens in Dallas-Fort Worth supported the idea but in 1973, when the Trinity River Authority sought voter approval of a $150 million bond to fund the project, the voters rejected the idea due to opposition from environmentalists.

Pool also authored the 1957 Pool Election Law requiring runoff elections for Texas US Senate races in which no candidate received an outright majority (better than 50%). This law allowed Lyndon Johnson to simultaneously run for re-election to his Senate seat as well as for the Democratic nomination for the US presidency in the 1960 election. Johnson lost the nomination to John F. Kennedy, but retained his Senate seat, which he gave up when Kennedy named him as his running mate for the general election.

=== Kennedy-Johnson Natural Resources Advisory Committee ===
JFK's letter to Joe Pool

Pool was an unsuccessful candidate for U.S. representative from the 5th District of Texas (Dallas County) in 1958, losing in the Democratic primary to Barefoot Sanders. He ran again in 1960, winning the primary, but lost in the general election to Republican incumbent Bruce Alger.

During the 1960 campaign Pool was on the same Dallas County Democratic ticket with then Senator John F. Kennedy and then Senator Lyndon B. Johnson. Through his acquaintance with LBJ's wife Lady Bird Johnson at college, Pool came to the attention of the presidential ticket, who recognized his candidacy as important to their efforts to win Texas in the 1960 presidential election. Pool was appointed by President Kennedy to the Kennedy-Johnson Natural Resources Advisory Committee.

Pool used this appointment to advocate for flood control projects for the Trinity River and its tributaries. Pool spent two months immersing himself into the flood control data that he had compiled when he was in the Texas legislature co-authoring the Trinity River Act of 1955. He updated his flood research to 1960 with all of North Texas creeks and streams that were flood prone. What Pool formulated from his research grew into a flood control report for North Texas. Pool's report, produced in December 15, 1960, included his analysis of these flood prone watersheds and his recommendation of what corrections the federal government should enact to alleviate flooding in these watersheds.

In his report Pool advocated for a navigation canal for shipping on the Trinity River from Fort Worth to the Gulf of Mexico which was a popular idea in the 1950s and 1960s before it fell out of public favor in the 1970s. He called out "polluter cities" in the 18,000 square mile Trinity Basin that were the result of insufficient policing of the watershed and inadequate water conservation facilities. Pool favored more state control of rivers totally within Texas borders. He commented on the most recent City of Dallas water study. Pool stated, "One of the salient features of this report calls for the construction of a reservoir on the Elm Fork of the Trinity River upstream from the existing Garza-Little Elm project. Another calls for a similar reservoir in Denton Creek upstream from the Grapevine project. However, there is a remaining stream below Dallas that is uncontrolled--Mountain Creek. This stream embraces a drainage area of 300 sq. miles and presently has no flood control whatsoever. I believe that a project should be undertaken on this stream not only for flood control but for such conservation as can be economically justified." Director Frank E. Smith of the Kennedy-Johnson Natural Resources Advisory Committee's office confirmed receipt of Joe Pool's report on December 20, 1960.

Pool served on the Kennedy/Johnson Natural Resources Advisory Committee from September 23, 1960 until he ran for Texas U.S. congressman-at-large in 1962.

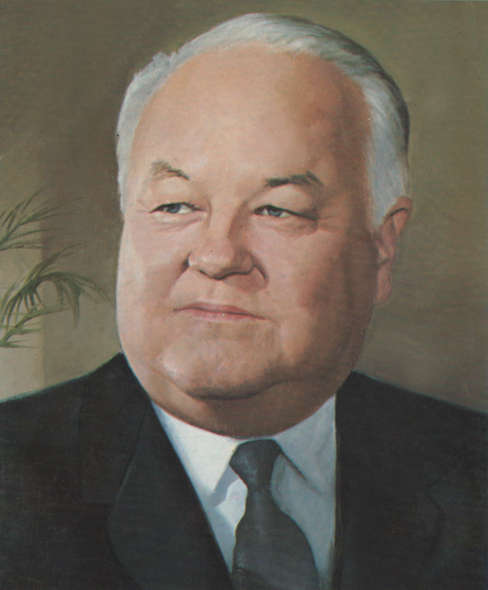
Joe R. Pool

=== United States Congress ===
==== Congressman-at-large ====
In the 1960 Congressional reapportionment, Texas received an additional U.S. House seat, but the districts were not redrawn and an at-large seat was created by the legislature. Pool won the Democratic nomination and defeated the Republican in the general election to serve in the Eighty-eighth Congress. He was also re-elected at-large to the Eighty-ninth Congress in 1964.

Pool was the last congressman-at-large from Texas and the United States. Representing the entire state of Texas, and having a personal relationship with President Johnson through his college friendship with Lady Bird Johnson, Pool wielded greater influence than other members of Congress, allowing him to push through some pet projects. Pool, along with his wife Elizabeth, were LBJ delegates to the 1964 Democratic National Convention in Atlantic City.

==== Congressman for the Third District of Texas ====
In Wesberry v. Sanders (1964), the U.S. Supreme Court banned at-large Congressional districts. Texas redrew its districts, and Pool was re-elected again to the Ninetieth Congress in 1966. but this time to the 3rd district that encompassed the western half of Dallas County.

Pool served in Congress from January 9, 1963, until his death from a heart attack on July 14, 1968, at Hobby Airport in Houston, Texas. Pool, as a member of his House Post Office Subcommittee, was on a postal facility inspection tour of facilities in Los Angeles and Houston at the time of his death. In an article written in the Dallas Times Herald President Johnson expressed his condolence: "A saddened President Johnson paid warm tribute Monday to his Texas friend and Dallas congressman, the late Joe Pool. 'I am saddened over the untimely death of Rep. Joe Pool. As a member of congress — and before that as a member of the Texas State Legislature — Joe Pool served with dedication and love for his country,' the President said. 'Mrs. Johnson and I extend our deepest sympathies to Mrs. Pool and her four sons in this hour of sorrow.' The President's message of condolence was only one of scores coming into Dallas in the wake of the Dallas lawmaker's death Sunday in Houston." U.S. House of Representatives Speaker John W. McCormack of Massachusetts said in his eulogy of Pool on the House floor "It can truly be said he died in the line of duty. He was one of the foremost men of the country in fighting for those ideals for which America stands, for measures that would strengthen our institutions of government and combatting those that would destroy our government". In another eulogy before the House of Representatives with the surviving Pool family in attendance, Republican Minority Leader and future president Gerald Ford of Michigan referred to Pool as "A real patriot, greatly interested in our national security, deeply concerned about elements he thought were undermining our nation". Texas State Senator Jimmy Phillips of Angleton, Texas, eulogized to 900 mourners at Pool's funeral at the Tyler Street Methodist Church in the Oak Cliff part of Dallas where Pool grew up, "Pool gave his life for his country". Pool was interred in Laurel Land Memorial Park, also in the Oak Cliff area of Dallas, Texas.

==== Congressional record ====
===== U.S. Postal and Civil Service Committee =====
Pool served on the U.S. Postal and Civil Service committee as a sub-committee chairman from January 3, 1963, until his death July 14, 1968. During this time, he traveled to Vietnam to inspect postal facilities serving troops there, and fought for investigation of federal government research and development contracts.

===== Texas national parks and seashores =====
Pool served as author or co-author of the funding bills for two of Texas' national parks and seashores, including Guadalupe Mountains National Park and Padre Island National Seashore.

===== Dallas/Fort Worth International Airport =====
Pool co-authored the U.S. House of Representatives funding bills starting in 1966 for land acquisition of 18,000 acres to develop Dallas/Fort Worth Regional (International) Airport.

==== House Un-American Activities Committee ====
===== Ku Klux Klan activities investigations =====
As congressman-at-large, Pool was acting chairman of these hearings from 1965 to 1966.

With civil right activists being harassed in the south early in 1965 before the Ku Klux Klan HUAC hearings began, Pool predicted his House Un-American Activities Committee would vote as early as March 1965 to investigate terrorist organizations such as the Ku Klux Klan, the Minutemen (anti-Communist organization), the Black Muslims, and the American Nazi Party. Prior to the hearings Pool said "I am in favor of investigating all four groups." Pool made the statement in the wake of President Lyndon Johnson's suggestion that a congressional committee might well look into the Klan's activities.

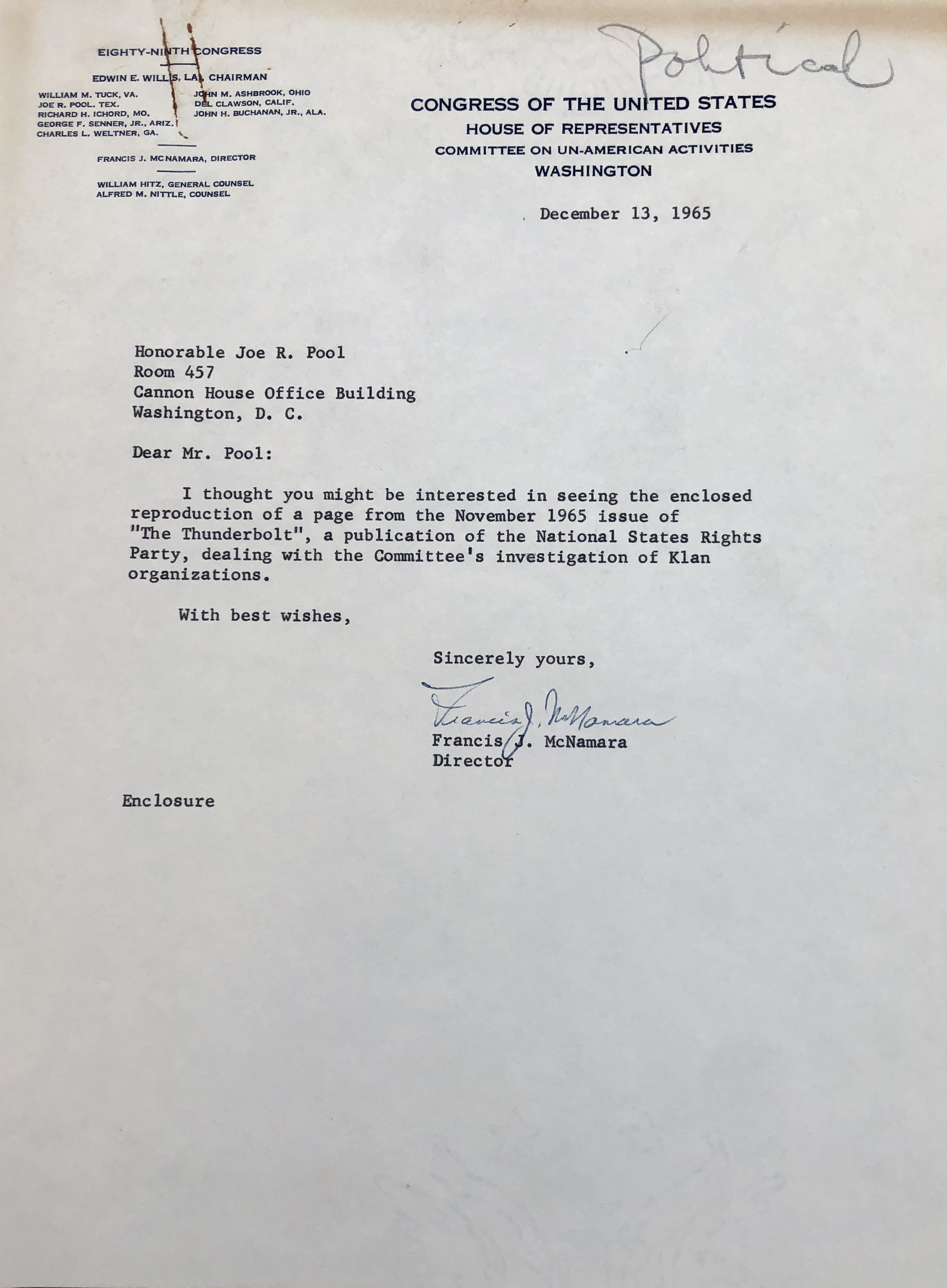
Congress of The United States House of Representatives Committee on Un-American Activities Washington December 13, 1965-Francis J. McNamara Director https://www.pumphreyfuneralhome.com/obituaries/obituary-listings?obId=2467055

Pool thought congress should try to determine whether a constitutional law can be drawn that would outlaw the KKK. Pool stated "I think the Ku Klux Klan is almost as great a threat to America as the Communist Party ... Both seek to destroy our American ideals." Pool suggested an investigation of the Klan by his committee would do a great deal in "exposing the subversive nature of the Klan ... I believe all of the committee members agree that organizations such as the KKK are subversive and fall under our investigative power and concern". Pool further declared, "I feel that when any organization which have philosophies, 'which lead' to anarchy are exposed to the American people, they lose what influence they might have had." Pool lambasted the Minutemen and the KKK as being harmful to conservative principles in government. "They claim to be conservative but all they are doing is creating a bad image for conservative principles", he stated.

At the end of October 1965 with the Klan hearings well underway, Pool "was convinced that 40-50 Ku Klux Klan leaders will spend jail time as a result of the KKK hearings by the HUAC Committee". Pool, as acting chairman of the committee investigating the Klan, charged the leaders with contempt of Congress when they refused to bring subpoenaed records to the hearing.

Pool added that the Internal Revenue Service and the Post Office Department are expected to examine committee findings for possible violations by the leaders. In a speech before the Dallas Federal Business Association members Pool stated that during the Klan hearings he has observed "a flagrant disrespect of values which are meaningful to me--law and order, respect for fellow human beings, justice and the American way of life."

"Our goal is to provide full information and legislative recommendations to Congress in order that we may effectively cope with the problems the Klan organizations are creating in our nation," Pool relayed. "The investigation has already revealed endless terrorist acts throughout the Southern states. Without exception, every former Klansmen submitting testimony before the committee has requested bodily protection to and from the hearing room, to his hotel room and to his train or plane...their fear lies in what vengeance might be wrought upon them by Klan hierarchy for revealing Klan activities," Pool stated. The Klan's threats knew no bounds during the hearings, they even included acting committee chairman. In February 1966 Chairman Joe Pool in his Washington D.C. office received a Western Union telegram from a Klan supporter from Midland, Texas. Pool showed family members the telegram. It stated "Congressman Joe Pool, Kill the Klan Hearings or We Will Kill You!" Anonymous. Pool, not deterred, then gave the telegram to the FBI for investigation.

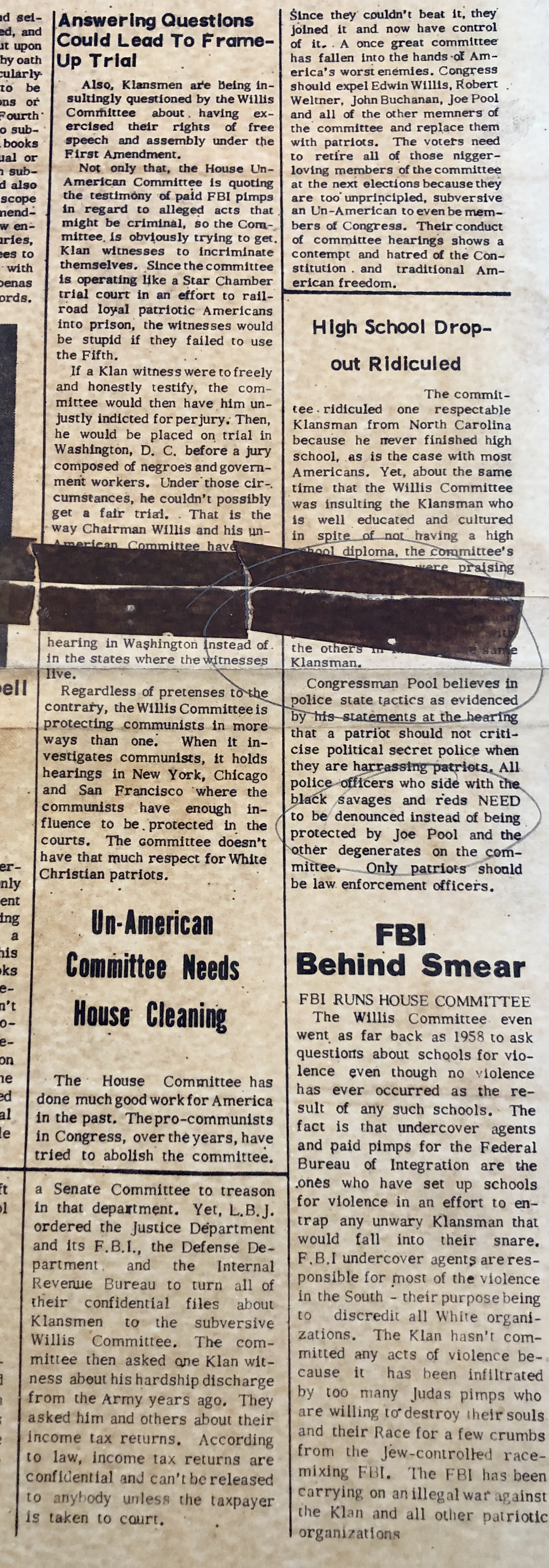
The Thunderbolt Pg 7, November 1965 Edition, National State Rights Party, Publisher

Committee on Un-American Activities U.S. House of Representatives Chairman Edwin E. Willis, Democrat (La) introduced the committee's Ku Klux Klan bill on the floor of the House June 14, 1966. The bill would give law enforcement the power to arrest or fine KKK supporters for their unlawful activities. Congressman Joe Pool supported the bill. The Klan hearings received national exposure through television and written news organizations.

The Ku Klux Klan, through an anonymous supporter, sent in through their print publication voice their review of the October 1965 Klan hearings to the HUAC Committee Director Francis J. McNamara on December 13, 1965. The director sent copies of the review to committee members of The Thunderbolt. According to McNamara, it is a publication of the National State Rights Party. The November 1965 issue deals with their opinion of the HUAC Committee's investigation of Klan organizations. The following image is on page 7 of the November 1965 issue of "The Thunderbolt" that the committee director received from the Klan supporter.

===== Vietnam War protest groups investigations =====
As Congressman from Dallas, Pool was acting HUAC Chairman of these hearings from 1966-1968.

The second time Joe Pool became a national figure was in August 1966 when he was named to chair a sub-committee that would hold hearings on his bill, H.R. 12047, to make it a federal crime to aid anyone engaged in an armed conflict against the United States in time of undeclared war. Pool subpoenaed the Vietnam anti-war protest organizations and their leaders who resisted the Vietnam War by collecting money for North Vietnam or by blocking troop trains. The American Civil Liberties Union sought to stop the HUAC hearings as an infringement of free speech. A federal judge issued a restraining order to stop Pool's hearings. Pool ignored it saying he would start hearings at the appointed time. Finally, an appeals court dissolved the order and the hearings began on August 16, 1966.

The proceedings were unruly. "Hundreds of people filled the hearing room, and supporters of the anti-war protest heckled the subcommittee and its chairman. Pool was called a racist and "rather a fool." A question from the committee, one witness said, so nauseated him that "I am liable to vomit all over this table." Impatient with these delaying tactics and personal abuse, Pool had more than 50 spectators and witnesses removed. Fifty-four people were arrested. Arthur Kinoy, one of the lawyers for the hostile witnesses, began an exchange with Pool that ended with the attorney being dragged from the room as he shouted "Don't touch a lawyer." Other attorneys for witnesses left in protest. When the hearings concluded, the full committee sent Pool's bill, H.R. 12047 to the House, which passed in October 1967. The Senate did not act on the measure before adjournment.

Pool's constituents cheered him when he returned to Dallas. "Most Americans live for the day when they can do something that will go down in history," he told them. "I feel like I did exactly that last week," Pool said.

In the fall 1966 election Pool defeated his Republican challenger. Congressman Pool's HUAC hearings exemplified the tensions that the Vietnam War and race relations produced in the 1960's and gave him his moments of celebrity.

== Legacy ==
=== Joe Pool Lake ===
Joe Pool Lake is a fresh water impoundment (reservoir) located in the southern part of the Dallas/Fort Worth Metroplex in North Texas. The lake encompasses parts of Tarrant, Dallas and Ellis counties. The lake measures 7,740 acres (31.3 km^{2}) with a conservation storage capacity of 176,900 acre-feet (218,200,000 m^{3}). With a maximum depth of 75 feet (23 m) the lake drains an area of 232 square miles (601 km^{2}).

The project to build Joe Pool Lake arose from Pool's dedication to flood control issues as expressed in his 1960 Kennedy-Johnson Natural Resources Advisory Committee report where his recommendations included the building of several new flood control lakes for North Texas. One of these flood control lakes was to be on Mountain/Walnut Creek. The future Lakeview (Joe Pool) Lake had been a longstanding goal for Pool, and although often delayed, was finally accomplished after Pool's death in 1968 by a citizens committee called the Lakeview (Joe Pool) Planning Council and Pool's congressional friends. The oft-stalled lake project was approved by Congress in 1965.

Prior to 1982 Pool's lake project was called Lakeview Reservoir. On December 31, 1982 President Ronald W. Reagan signed a bill to rename the lake to Joe Pool Lake. The lake had been a subject of delays caused by property owners refusing to sell to the U.S. Army Corps of Engineers, environmental lawsuits, and a lack of funding in the early 1970s.

As a result, when construction began in 1977 – nine years after Pool died – it became one of the first projects in the nation to pay its own way because of federal cuts in recreational park projects.

Work on the bridges was finished in 1981. Construction of the lake dam was completed in December 1985. Impoundment of water began in January 1986 and the lake was filled by June 1989.

On May 24, 1986, before being open to the public, a ceremony with food, music, cannons, and speeches was held to dedicate the new Joe Pool Lake. 1500 people attended. Among them, U.S. Representative Jim Wright (at that time Democratic Majority Leader of the House of Representatives) and others who helped keep the project alive.

=== Joe Pool staff and constituent service ===
Throughout Pool's career in Washington, Dallas, Austin, and other U.S. congressional and Texas legislative offices constituent service was important. Over the years Pool's staff received many accolades for their professionalism and decorum. Pool mentored office staff to overachieve when working for their real bosses, the constituents. After Pool died Mrs. Patty Tyson, Pool's top Washington aide, while packing up the closing office said, "the staff had caught up on constituents mail". As for Pool's office motto of "overachievement for our constituents" and Pool's mentorship to his staff, Tyson stated, "One of Pool's aides, a young Negro named Bill Price, has enrolled in the first class of the new Federal City College which opens here next week. He will be editor of the college newspaper."

H.R. 9342 Marie Tippit

December 3, 1963 Pool authored H.R. 9342 that the Secretary of Treasury shall pay his constituent Marie Tippit, of Dallas, Texas the sum of $25,000 in recognition by the United States of the sacrifice made by her husband, the late Officer J.D. Tippit, of the Dallas Police Department, who was fatally wounded on November 22, 1963 while attempting to apprehend the alleged assassin of the late President of the United States, John F. Kennedy.

=== Other memorials ===
- Pool's involvement in the creation of the Dallas Fort Worth International Airport is recognized by the naming of JOE POOL SEVEN standard instrument departure (SID) route, serving DFW.
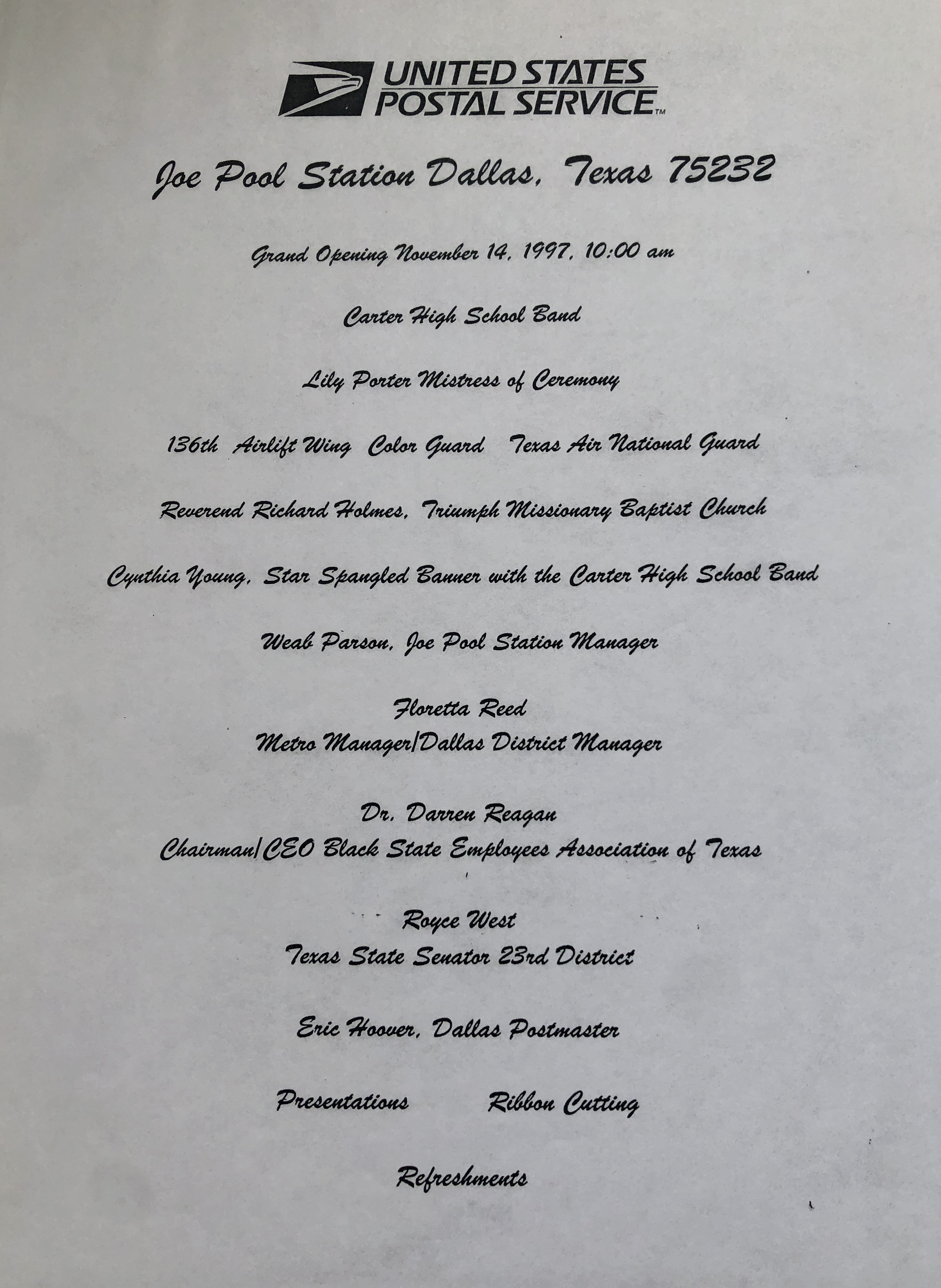
- "It can truly be said he died in the line of duty" -U.S. House of Representatives Speaker John McCormack of Massachusetts eulogy on the U.S. House Floor. July 26, 1968
  Pool's time on the U.S. Postal and Civil Service Committee was recognized with the naming of the Joe Pool Station, a United States Postal Services Facility located next to Executive Airport in southwest Dallas, Texas. On July 14, 1968 Pool, while on a postal facility inspection tour of facilities in Los Angeles, California and Houston, Texas, died of a heart attack at Hobby Airport in Houston. In the Dallas Times Herald July 26, 1968 in his eulogy of Joe Pool on the House floor of the U.S. House of Representatives Speaker John McCormack of Massachusetts said "It can truly be said he died in the line of duty."

== See also ==
- List of members of the United States Congress who died in office (1950–1999)
- List of members of the House Un-American Activities Committee

== Sources ==
- United States Congress. "Joe R. Pool (id: P000426)". Biographical Directory of the United States Congress.

Texas House of Representatives
Preceded by unknown	Member of the Texas House of Representatives from District 51 Place 5 (Dallas); 1953–1958	Succeeded by unknown
U.S. House of Representatives
Preceded by District created	Member of the U.S. House of Representatives from Texas's at-large congressional seat January 3, 1963 – January 3, 1967	Succeeded by District abolished
Preceded by Lindley Beckworth	Member of the U.S. House of Representatives from Texas's 3rd congressional district January 3, 1967 – July 14, 1968	Succeeded by James M. Collins
