= James M. Collins =

American politician (1916–1989)

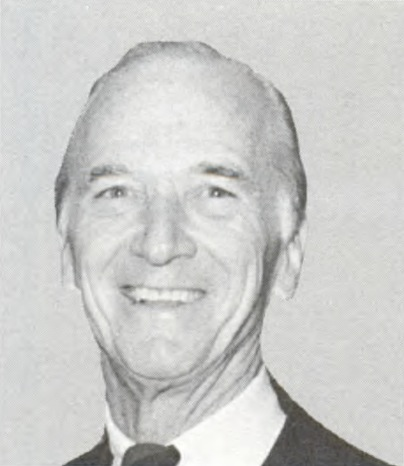

Member of the U.S. House of Representatives from Texas's 3rd district
- In office August 24, 1968 – January 3, 1983
- Preceded by: Joe R. Pool
- Succeeded by: Steve Bartlett

Personal details
- Born: James Mitchell Collins; April 29, 1916 Hallsville, Texas, U.S.
- Died: July 21, 1989 (aged 73) Dallas, Texas, U.S.
- Party: Republican
- Children: 3
- Relatives: Richard W. Fisher (son-in-law)
- Education: Southern Methodist University (BS); Harvard University (MBA)
- Profession: Businessman

Military service
- Allegiance: United States
- Branch/service: United States Army
- Unit: Third Army
- Battles/wars: World War II

James Mitchell Collins (April 29, 1916 – July 21, 1989) was an American businessman and a Republican politician who represented the Third Congressional District of Texas from 1968 to 1983. The district was based at the time around Irving in Dallas County.

== Background ==
Collins was born in Hallsville in Harrison County in East Texas. His father, Carr Collins Sr., had founded the Fidelity Union Life Insurance Company; his sister was Ruth Sharp Altshuler. He graduated from Woodrow Wilson High School in Dallas. In 1989, Collins was inducted into the Woodrow Wilson High School Hall of Fame the same year it was created in celebration of the sixtieth anniversary of the institution. Collins graduated thereafter from Southern Methodist University.

In 1966, Collins ran for the U.S. House in the 3rd District, a newly created district in north Dallas. He lost to incumbent Democrat Joe R. Pool in a close race, taking 46 percent of the vote to Pool's 53 percent. Pool died in July 1968, and Collins won the ensuing special election, defeating Pool's widow, Elizabeth, with over 60 percent of the vote. His victory was part of a strong trend toward the GOP in north Dallas; this district has been in Republican hands without interruption since then. He won a full term in the general election that fall, he received 81,696 votes (59.4 percent) to 55,939 (40.6 percent) for Democrat Robert H. Hughes. He would never face another contest nearly that close, never dropping below 64 percent of the vote and even running unopposed in 1978.

As a politician, Collins was an opponent of desegregation bussing. In 1972, Collins was implicated in a salary kickback scheme involving his staff.

Party political offices
Preceded by Alan Steelman	Republican nominee for U.S. Senator from Texas (Class 1); 1982	Succeeded by Beau Boulter
U.S. House of Representatives
Preceded by Joe R. Pool (D)	United States Representative for the 3rd Congressional District of Texas; 1968–1983	Succeeded by Steve Bartlett (R)
