= Vinson Allen Collins =

Texas politician

Member of the Texas Senate from the 4th district
- In office September 4, 1917 – January 14, 1919
- Preceded by: Stephen Marion King
- Succeeded by: Wilfred Roy Cousins, Sr.
- In office January 10, 1911 – January 12, 1915
- Preceded by: Edward Irwin Kellie
- Succeeded by: Stephen Marion King

Personal details
- Born: March 1, 1867 Hardin County, Texas, U.S.
- Died: July 5, 1966 (aged 99) Dallas, Texas, U.S.
- Party: Democratic
- Spouses: Elizabeth (Lizzie) Hopkins; Nannie Kuykendall
- Children: 6, including Carr Collins Sr.
- Parents: Warren Collins; Eboline Valentine Collins
- Education: Sam Houston State Normal College
- Occupation: Schoolteacher, lawyer, politician

Vinson Allen Collins (March 1, 1867 - July 5, 1966) was a Texas politician.

== Early life and education ==
Vinson Allen Collins was born in Hardin County, Texas near Honey Island on March 1, 1867. He was the seventh child of Warren Collins and Eboline Valentine Collins. The Collins family had moved to Texas from Mississippi in 1854.

He graduated from Sam Houston State Normal College (now part of Sam Houston State University) in 1893.

== Career ==
He started his career as a schoolteacher in Big Sandy Independent School District in Polk County, Texas while studying the Law. He was admitted to the State Bar of Texas in 1901 and opened a law practice in Beaumont, Texas.

He served three terms in the Texas Senate as a Democrat. He sponsored the law that established a workers' compensation system in Texas and established the Texas Industrial Accident Board, and the law restricting work to eight hours a day. In a race for the United States House of Representatives, he was defeated by Martin Dies, Sr. In 1924, his campaign for Governor of Texas against Felix D. Robertson and Miriam A. "Ma" Ferguson was unsuccessful and Ferguson was elected.

He was a supporter of prohibition and of women’s suffrage.

== Personal life ==
He was married twice, first to Elizabeth (Lizzie) Hopkins and later to Nannie Kuykendall. He had six children. Carr Collins, Sr., son of V.A. Collins and Lizzie Hopkins, was an insurance executive and philanthropist.

== Death ==
Collins died in Dallas, Texas on July 5, 1966 and is buried in Livingston, Texas.
