= Carr Collins Sr. =

American insurance business magnate and philanthropist (1892-1980)

- Born: May 12, 1892
- Died: January 17, 1980 (aged 87)
- Occupations: Businessman, philanthropist
- Spouse: Ruth Woodall
- Children: 3 including: James M. Collins; Ruth Collins Sharp Altshuler
- Father: Vinson Allen Collins

Carr P. Collins Sr. (May 12, 1892 – January 17, 1980) was an American insurance magnate and philanthropist.

== Early life ==
Carr P. Collins Sr. was born on May 12, 1892. His father was Vinson Allen Collins and his mother, Elizabeth (Lizzie) Hopkins. His paternal grandparents were Eboline and Warren Collins. The Collins family moved to Texas from Mississippi in 1854, prior to the American Civil War.

He spent one year at Southwest Texas State Teachers College (now Texas State University).

== Business career ==
In 1913, he was appointed first secretary of the Texas Industrial Accident Board, which had been founded as a result of legislation sponsored by his father in the Texas Senate. He then had a long career in insurance. He founded the Fidelity Union Life Insurance Company in 1928 in partnership with William Morriss. In 1958, the newly constructed Fidelity Union high rise was the tallest skyscraper west of the Mississippi River. The company's rapid growth resulted from a novel employee stock option plan partially devised by Collins. The company was sold to Alliance of Germany for $360,000,000 in 1980.

In the 1930s, he launched a coast-to-coast radio selling campaign for a product called Crazy Crystals, dehydrated minerals from the springs at Mineral Wells, Texas. They were advertised both as being a laxative and as having other healing powers when dissolved in water. His radio station XEAW was the most powerful station in the country at that time, which he used to market Crazy Crystals. He also owned the Crazy Water Hotel in Mineral Wells, Texas to accommodate movie stars and celebrities seeking therapeutic treatment. Sales reputedly reached $3 million a year, although the Food and Drug Administration later declared the product (and numerous similar products) fraudulent. Other early accomplishments include the startup of Ventahood, still owned and operated by the Woodall side of the family.

In 1968, he received the Golden Plate Award of the American Academy of Achievement.

In the later decades of his life, he was involved in a number of manufacturing and homebuilding ventures which included Mayflower Estates in Dallas north of Preston Hollow.

== Politics ==
He was also involved in Texas politics as a Democrat.

In 1938, he became an advisor to gubernatorial candidate W. Lee O'Daniel. As governor, O'Daniel tried to appoint Collins to the state highway commission, thus breaking the tradition of giving each major section of the state a member; the Senate voted Collins down. After a bitterly disputed race for the United States Senate in 1941, in which O'Daniel narrowly defeated Lyndon B. Johnson, a Texas Senate investigating committee questioned Collins about a large undeclared gift of radio time to O'Daniel on Collins's Mexican station, XEAW. Collins claimed that the time was paid for by O'Daniel's friends but that he could not remember the donors and had kept no records of the contributions.

== Personal life ==
He married Ruth Woodall, a schoolteacher from Hallsville, Texas, in 1914. They had three children together: James M Collins, businessman and member of the U.S. House of Representatives; Carr Collins Jr., a businessman and amateur genealogist; and Ruth Collins Sharp Altshuler, a prominent Dallas philanthropist.

== Death ==
He died on January 17, 1980.
