= Lev Altshuler =

Soviet physicist (1913–2003)

Lev Vladimirovitch Altshuler
- Born: 9 November 1913; Moscow, Russia
- Died: 23 December 2003 (aged 90); Moscow, Russia
- Citizenship: Soviet Union, Russia
- Education: Moscow State University
- Spouse: Mariya Speranskaya
- Children: 3
- Scientific career
- Fields: Condensed Matter Physics
- Thesis: (1943)

Lev Vladimirovitch Altshuler (Russian: Лев Владимирович Альтшулер, 9 November 1913 – 23 December 2003) was a Soviet physicist, one of the founders of the study of solids under extremely high pressures and temperatures and a member of the Soviet atomic bomb project.

== Biography ==
Altshuler was born in a family of Jewish intellectuals in Moscow. His father Vladimir Aleksandrovich Altshuler (1882–1965) was a lawyer and former revolutionary who worked at the Soviet Ministry of Finances. Altshuler had a brother Sergei (1909–1979) and a sister Olga (1912–1992). In 1932 he started working at the X-ray Laboratory of the Moscow Machine Building Institute. Two years later he enrolled to the Moscow State University, graduating in 1936. Being a specialist in properties of metals and an aviation engineer, he was sent to the Soviet Army in 1940, but in 1942 recalled from the front to the laboratories of the Soviet Academy of Sciences. During those World War II years he defended a PhD (1943) and developed a pulsed X-ray radiography method for real-time analysis of damage induced by a projectile to the tank armor, receiving the State Prize for this work in 1946. The same year he was assigned to the Soviet atomic bomb project. Between 1946 and 1969 he worked at the Soviet Nuclear Center Arzamas-16 under top secret conditions, defending a habilitation in 1954. His administrative promotions were hampered by his outspoken nature, as he publicly opposed some official views and policies. In 1969 he returned to Moscow, assuming a position of department head at the Institute of Optical-Physical Measurements. Twenty years later he became a Chief Researcher at the Institute for High Energy Densities of the Russian Academy of Sciences. In his late years Altshuler published several books and articles on high-pressure science and on the history of the Soviet Atomic Project.

Altshuler was married to Mariya Speranskaya (1916–1977); they had three sons: Boris (born 1939), Aleksandr (born 1945) and Mikhail (born 1955). Boris became a notable physicist and besides his scientific research published a series of historical books related to Andrei Sakharov, his father and the Soviet atomic bomb project.

== Awards ==
- USSR State Prize (1946, 1949, 1953)
- Order of Lenin (1949, 1953, 1967)
- Lenin Prize (1962)
- Shock Compression Science Award of the American Physical Society (1991)
- Russia State Prize (1999)
