= Eleazar Altschul =

17th-century Jewish editor and writer

Eleazar ben Abraham Ḥanok Perles Altschul (died in Prague between 1632 and 1638) was a Jewish editor and writer.

== Works ==
Altschul was the editor of several works, to most of which he added remarks, glosses, or comments of his own. In the epitaph written for him by his son Isaac, he is quoted as the author of several works; but these are no longer extant. The only one that may perhaps be attributed to him in its entirety is the "Diḳduḳe Yiẓḥaḳ," a grammatical work; but it has been claimed that even for this book the notes had been previously collected by his father-in-law, Isaac ben Jekuthiel (Kohen) Kuskes, and that the name was not given to the work merely in honor of the latter. The "Diḳduḳe Yiẓḥaḳ" is still unpublished (Adolf Neubauer, "Catalogue of the Hebrew MSS. in the Bodleian Library" No. 1497).

The following works were edited by Eleazar:

1. "Ḳeneh Ḥokmah" (Acquire Wisdom), or "Ḳeneh Binah" (Acquire Understanding). This book, which is really part of the "Sefer haḲanah," and which the editor, in the preface, claims to have copied from a parchment manuscript "several hundred years old," found by his father in a loft, is mainly a kabbalistic exposition of the "Ḳeriat Shema'," as well as of the divine name of seventy-two "letters of abbreviation," etc. (Prague, 1609–1611; reprinted in Kraków, 1894). The Zohar and other kabbalistic sources have manifestly had an influence on this work (Moritz Steinschneider, "Catalogue of the Hebrew Books in the Bodleian Library" col. 637; "Literaturblatt," xi. 761).
2. "Zebaḥ Todah" (Sacrifice of Thanksgiving), containing the "Prayer" of Solomon Luria, the "Thirteen Prostrations" of Avigdor Kara, and the "Supplication" of Ishmael ben Elisha, published at Prague in 1615 (Johann Christoph Wolf, "Bibliotheca Hebræa" vol. iii.).
3. "Yam shel Shelomoh," Solomon Luria's commentary on the treatise "Bava Kamma" (Prague, 1616).
4. "Tiḳḳun Moẓaë Shabbat," a prayer-book for Sabbath night. A kabbalistic exposition of the Sabbath-night service is added to the text; and toward the end of the volume there is a German adaptation of some of the prayers. The work was first published by Eleazar's son Isaac at Amsterdam in 1655; and with it is included the epitaph composed by Isaac for his father (Moritz Steinschneider, "Catalogue of the Hebrew Books in the Bodleian Library" col. 474).
