= TheVentures =

South Korean venture fund

- Company type: Private Ownership
- Industry: Venture capital
- Founded: 2014; 12 years ago
- Headquarters: Seoul, South Korea
- Products: Venture capital, Growth capital

TheVentures (Korean: 더벤처스) is a venture fund based in Seoul, South Korea that makes seed investments (between $50,000 and $300,000) in startups.

== History ==
The firm was created in January 2014 by Vingle and Vicki co-founders Changseong Ho and Jiwon Moon.

In 2014 and 2015, the company was ranked by a government-funded survey as the most desired source of funding in Korea by Angel stage entrepreneurs
