= Samuel Altshuler =

Businessman

- Born: September 16, 1864; San Francisco, California
- Died: January 13, 1956 (aged 91); San Francisco, California
- Occupations: Merchant; secretary of the board of fire delegates; mine owner
- Years active: 1879 – c. 1950
- Organizations: Independent Order of Odd Fellows; Native Sons of the Golden West; Fraternal Order of Eagles; California Kamloops Inc.
- Known for: Was a clothing retailer in Whatcom, Washington and San Francisco, California. Was an active participant in industrial development of the city of Whatcom (Bellingham), and a successful mine owner in California.
- Political party: Republican
- Children: 2

Samuel Altshuler (September 16, 1864 – January 13, 1956) was a clothing merchant, mine owner, and industrial developer in the states of Washington and California. He opened and owned clothing stores in Whatcom, Washington (later Bellingham), and his native San Francisco, California, and built several business buildings in both cities.

In Whatcom, Altshuler took an active role in development of industrial companies into valuable businesses. He helped establish the city's first National Guard division and fire department. He was an active participant in discussions regarding building the Chicago, Milwaukee & St. Paul railroad line through Bellingham. In California, Altshuler owned the Monitor (or Plumas National) mine and the Jackson Gold Mine, and was the secretary of the Plumas Copper King Mines Corporation.

Altshuler was a member of fraternities, such as the Independent Order of Odd Fellows, the Native Sons of the Golden West, and the Fraternal Order of Eagles.

== Early life and family ==
Samuel Altshuler was born in San Francisco, California, on September 16, 1864. His father, German immigrant Levi Altshuler, moved to New Orleans, Louisiana, and crossed the Great Plains to the Pacific coast in 1852 with the gold diggers. Levi worked as a miner, later turning to work in merchandising and investing into real estate (including the land that was the site of the famous Baldwin Hotel). Samuel's mother, Henrietta Alpern, was also born in Germany, and died in 1887, when Samuel was twenty-three. Levi and Henrietta brought up six children in San Francisco. Samuel's brother Cass joined him in merchandising business, and the third brother, Sol, was a lithographer in San Francisco. They had three sisters– Millie, Ida, and Annette.

== Career ==
=== Career in Whatcom, Washington ===
After graduating high school in 1879, Altshuler entered business with his father, who had a clothing store. In 1889, Samuel moved to Whatcom, Washington (later Bellingham), and acquired 120 acres (49 ha) of land twelve miles from the city. At the corner of Holly and Canal Streets, he erected a three-story building and opened his own clothing store, which grew into the large and successful business. Later, he erected the two-story Irving building, which was also used for business purposes. During his career as a businessman, Altshuler was interested in industrial companies across the state, and helped many of them expand.

Altshuller helped establish the Whatcom Fire Department. For five years, he served as secretary of the board of fire delegates, and from 1892–1893 served as foreman for Hose Company No. 2.

In 1905, Altshuler was chosen by the Bellingham Chamber of Commerce to be a member of a committee discussing the foundation of a railroad line between Bellingham and Spokane as the Chicago, Milwaukee & St. Paul railroad was considering Bellingham as one of its stop points in the west.

=== Business in San Francisco ===
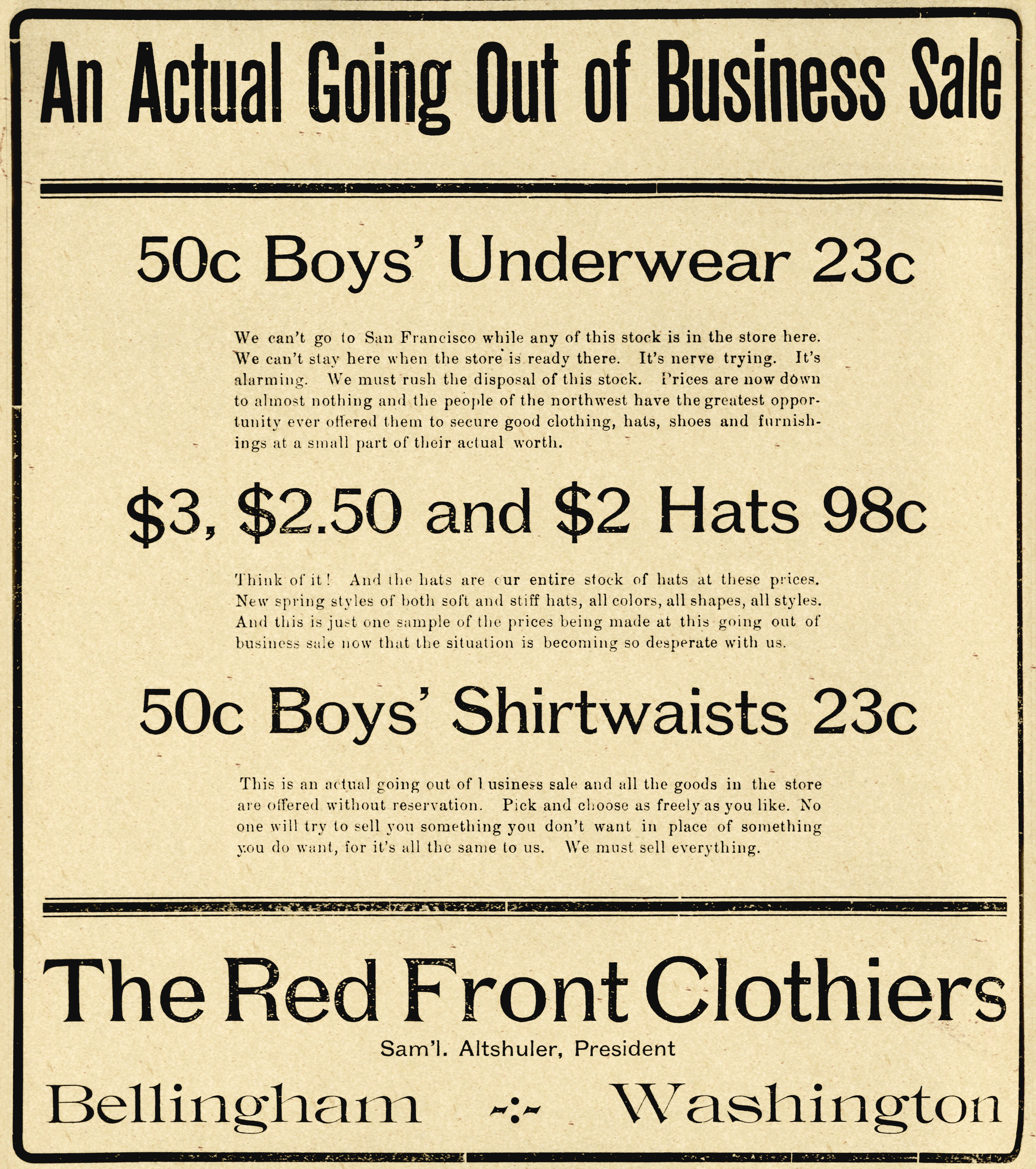
Newspaper advertisement for Samuel Altshuler's clothing store close-out sale, San Juan Islander, June 1906

In 1906, Altshuler launched a big sale in his Bellingham store, the Red Front Clothiers, making plans to close it and move his business to San Francisco. In a public letter, he announced that he had bought a lot on Van Ness Avenue in San Francisco, and that construction on his new store had already begun. The store in San Francisco was scheduled to open in July, 1906. Investing $250,000 ($6,600,000 in 2020 dollars (Note: The approximate value converted to 2020 dollars, based on a standard adjustment of the 1913 dollar value using the Consumer Price Index as calculated by United States Department of Labor.)) in San Francisco in 1909, Altshuler also purchased other property and planned on erecting other buildings to use in the development of his merchandise business.

=== Mining business in Greenville, California ===
After moving to San Francisco, Altshuler also lived in Greenville, California, owning a cabin near the Soda Creek stream, that was later destroyed by fire. There, in 1913, he was an owner of the Monitor (or the Plumas National) mine, which was a rich source of quartz. Altshuler expanded the mines: workers opened up about 900 feet of the old tunnels. By 1921, the Plumas Copper King Mines Corporation was established, and Altshuler served as its secretary. He also owned the Jackson Gold Mine until approximately 1950.

== Memberships ==
In Whatcom (Bellingham), Altshuler was a founding member of the National Guard division, a member of Company M, and a lifetime member of Whatcom Lodge No. 151, F. & A. M. He was a member of the Independent Order of Odd Fellows, the Native Sons of the Golden West, and the Fraternal Order of Eagles.

== Personal life and death ==
On February 21, 1897, Altshuler married Josephine Jacobs, also from San Francisco. She was a daughter of Harriet Jacobs and Henry Jacobs, who worked as a merchant and postmaster in Folsom, California at the time of Lincoln's presidency, and a niece of Junius Jacobs, the U.S. sub-treasurer of San Francisco. The Altshulers had two sons: Henry Irving and Samuel.

Altshuler supported the Republican political party, and was invited to run for elected office multiple times; however, he declined.

As a member of California Kamloops Inc., an organization of fishermen, that held annual gatherings on Shasta Lake, he was called the King of the Kamloopers and the "most worthy member of the order." He attended every convention through 1955. Altshuler died in San Francisco on January 13, 1956, at the age of 91.

== See also ==
- Baldwin Hotel (San Francisco)
- Independent Order of Odd Fellows
- Native Sons of the Golden West
- Fraternal Order of Eagles

== Literature cited ==
"CPI Inflation Calculator", Bureau of Labor Statistics, Washington: United States Department of Labor
Petersen, Deborah, ed. (February 22, 1897), "Sunday weddings and receptions", San Francisco Examiner, San Francisco: San Francisco Media Co. LLC, p. 11, ISSN 2574-593X, LCCN 82006825, OCLC 848166557
"Eighteen men of Bellingham", Spokane Chronicle, Spokane: Cowles Company, p. 8, November 7, 1905, LCCN sn86072020, OCLC 14374699
"A Bellingham theory", Spokane Chronicle, Spokane: Cowles Company, p. 10, November 27, 1905, LCCN sn86072020, OCLC 14374699
Culver, O. H., ed. (June 2, 1906), "The Red Front Stock must go double quick now", San Juan Islander, Friday Harbor: Culver Bros., p. 4, ISSN 2158-4737, LCCN 88085190, OCLC 17347718
Simpson, Ernest S., ed. (January 23, 1909), "Large sales made despite the rain", San Francisco Call, San Francisco: John D. Spreckles, p. 9, ISSN 1941-0719, LCCN sn85066387, OCLC 13146227
"Opening up the old Plumas National mine", Feather River Bulletin, Quincy: Feather Publishing Co., Inc., p. 1, August 28, 1913, OCLC 29688382
Gustus, Lauren, ed. (April 27, 1921), "Loses ,000 in bills when log cabin burns", The Sacramento Bee, Sacramento: McClatchy, p. 9, ISSN 0890-5738, OCLC 37706143
Petersen, Deborah, ed. (January 14, 1956), "Funeral notices", San Francisco Examiner, San Francisco: San Francisco Media Co. LLC, p. 15, ISSN 2574-593X, LCCN 82006825, OCLC 848166557
Altshuler, Samuel (March 25, 1921), "Annual meeting", The Recorder, San Francisco: Recorder Print and Publishing Co., p. 9, LCCN sn87067084, OCLC 4509682
Collins, Bill (June 22, 1956), Gustus, Lauren (ed.), "Funfest draws record throng of Kamloopers", The Sacramento Bee, Sacramento: McClatchy, p. 29, ISSN 0890-5738, OCLC 37706143
Prosser, William Farrand (1903), Lewis, Edward Gardner (ed.), A history of the Puget Sound country, its resources, its commerce and its people, New York City: Edward Gardner Lewis, LCCN 05013767
Wilson, Jack P. (June 24, 1955), Gustus, Lauren (ed.), "500 Fisherman meet for yearly Kamloops fete", The Sacramento Bee, Sacramento: McClatchy, p. 26, ISSN 0890-5738, OCLC 37706143
