= Moses Altschul =

Jewish writer (c. 1546 – 1633)

Moses ben Ḥanoch Altschul (commonly known as Moses Ḥanochs; c. 1546 – 1633) was the author of the "Brantspiegel" (1602).

Altschul was a considerable figure in the history of Jewish literature or, more properly speaking, of Judæo-German literature; for he was one of the first to use the vernacular in a polished diction, though he dealt with a subject that was not new nor peculiar to the secular life – that of ethics. The "Brantspiegel" (Mirror), called in Hebrew "Sefer HaMareh" (ספר המראה), first published at Basel, was intended as a direct appeal to the Jews of the period to live in social and moral purity. The book is divided into chapters, the number of which varies from sixty-eight to seventy-six, according to the different editions. They all indicate the many roads to morality, and the penance that the Jew should undergo for deviating from these roads. The author alleges two reasons for the title of his book: (1) It was called "Spiegel" (Mirror) because the author wished that it should be constantly before the people, to show them their own presentments. (2) "Brant" or "Brand" (Burning; that is, Magnifying) was pre-fixed because, as the author states, ordinary mirrors make things appear very small; while this glass was intended to show objects (especially bad qualities) in enlarged forms, so that people would then try to remove them. The author remarks, in the preface, that his book may be read on Shabbat. The work became very popular; it called forth many imitations and analogous works, such as the "Sitten Spiegel," "Zier Spiegel," "Zucht Spiegel," and at a much later date the "Kleine Brantspiegel" (Small Mirror); and the work is expressly mentioned in the epitaph of Altschul's son Ḥanoch (Moritz Steinschneider, "Catalogue of the Hebrew Books in the Bodleian Library" cols. 1312, 1823, 1824, and in "Serapeum," x. 325; Johann Christoph Wolf, "Bibliotheca Hebræa" i. No. 1544, ii. 1272, 107, iii. 750).

Moses ben Ḥanoch, who wrote "Zikron Bayit" (זכרון בית), was Altschul's grandson.

== Mistaken identity as Ish Yerushalaẏim ==
Altschul was often – as early even as 1676, on the very title-page of the Frankfurt edition of his work – mistaken for Ish Yerushalaẏim (a native of Jerusalem). This error is due to a corruption of the initial letters of his patronymic, א"ש into איש.
