= Mor Altshuler =

Israeli scholar

- Education: Hebrew University of Jerusalem; Tel Aviv University
- Occupation: Israel Scholar

Mor Altshuler (Hebrew: מור אלטשולר; born 1957) is an Israeli scholar of Hasidism, Kabbalism, and Jewish messianism.

== Early life and education ==
Mor Altshuler was born in Israel. She studied Jewish thought, Jewish philosophy, comparative literature and Talmudic studies at the Hebrew University of Jerusalem and the Tel Aviv University. She is married and has two children, Avshalom and Hemdat.

== Academic and media career ==
Altshuler has published studies in both Hebrew and English and wrote the television series The Guide – Rabbi Joseph Karo and the Golden Age of Kabbalah in Safed which she hosted for the Israeli T'chelet channel in 2003. Her views on contemporary issues have been published in Ynet's opinions section. Altshuler is an outspoken supporter of former president Donald Trump. On January 31, 2021, more than three weeks after the violent invasion of the US Capitol by Trump supporters, she published an article declaring that "the downfall of Trump is not a victory for democracy."

She claims that the first Hasidic tzadik was not the Baal Shem Tov but the Maggid of Zlotshov.
