= Andrew Foster Altschul =

American fiction writer

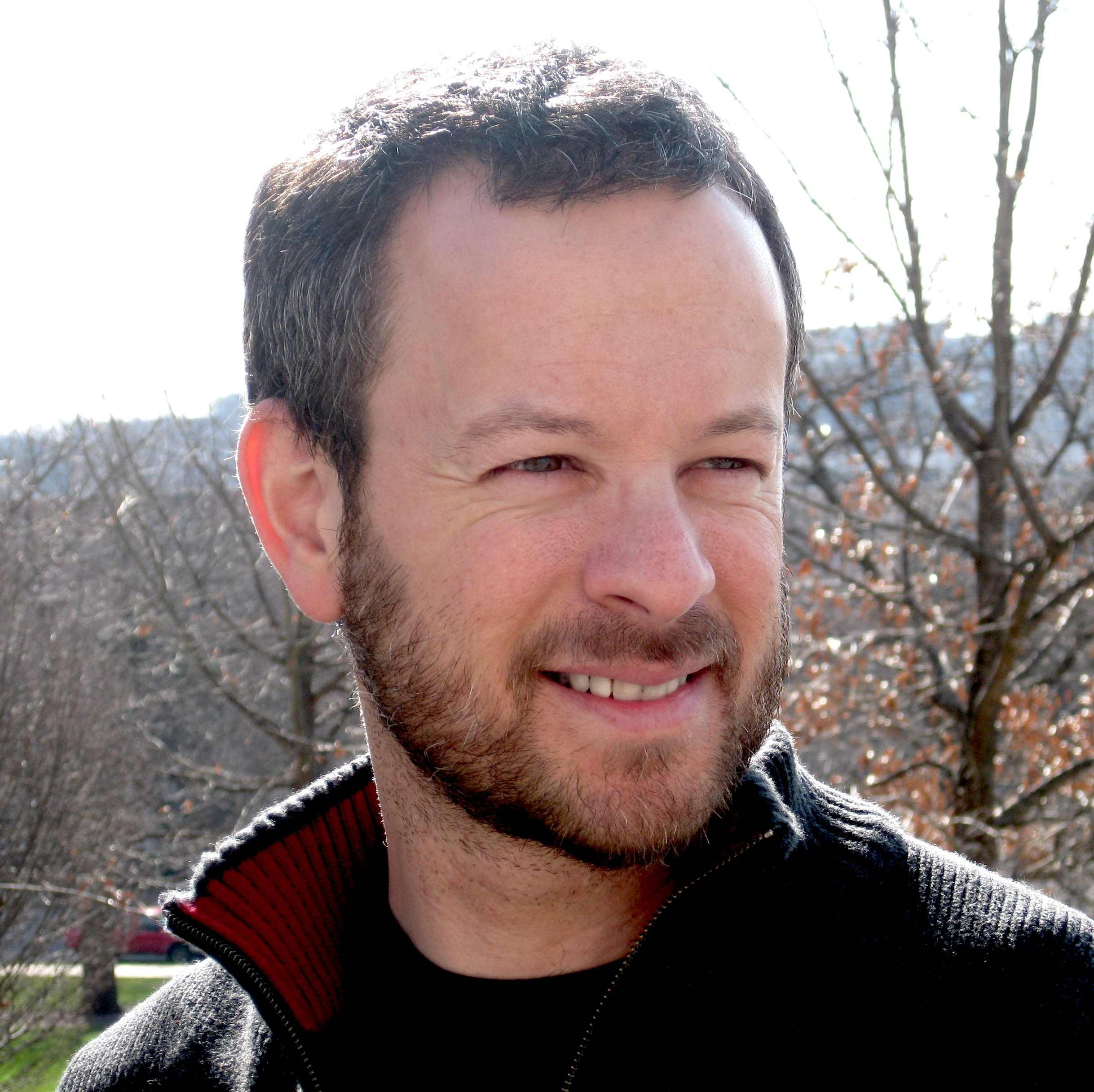
- Born: September 1969 (age 56); New Jersey, U.S.
- Education: Brown University (BA); University of California, Irvine (MFA)
- Spouse: Vauhini Vara

Andrew Foster Altschul (born September 1969) is an American fiction writer. He is the author of the novels Deus Ex Machina, Lady Lazarus, and The Gringa and his short fiction and essays have been published in Esquire, McSweeney's, Ploughshares, Fence, and One Story. His short story "Embarazada" was selected for Best American Nonrequired Reading 2014 and his short story "A New Kind of Gravity" was anthologized in both Best New American Voices 2006 and the O.Henry Prize Stories 2007.

Altschul received his BA from Brown University in 1991 and an MFA at UC Irvine in 1997. Altschul was a Wallace Stegner Fellow at Stanford University and then a Jones Lecturer in the Stanford Creative Writing Department.

From 2009 to 2015, he was an associate professor at San Jose State University and the director of their Center for Literary Arts.

In 2016, with Mark Slouka, Altschul co-authored Writers On Trump, an open letter opposing the candidacy of Donald Trump for President that was signed by nearly 500 writers, including ten winners of the Pulitzer Prize. He has written for political venues including The Huffington Post and Truthdig, was a contributing author of Where to Invade Next (McSweeney's, 2008), and was the co-organizer of the Progressive Reading Series, a series of literary readings in San Francisco that raised money for progressive political candidates from 2004 to 2008. From 2008 to 2011 he was the founding books editor of The Rumpus, an online magazine started by Stephen Elliott in late 2008. He remains a contributing editor to The Rumpus, as well as to the literary journal Zyzzyva.

Altschul joined the faculty of Colorado State University in 2015, where he teaches creative writing as of 2025.

He is married to The New Yorker journalist and fiction writer Vauhini Vara.
