= Semyon Altov =

Soviet comedy writer

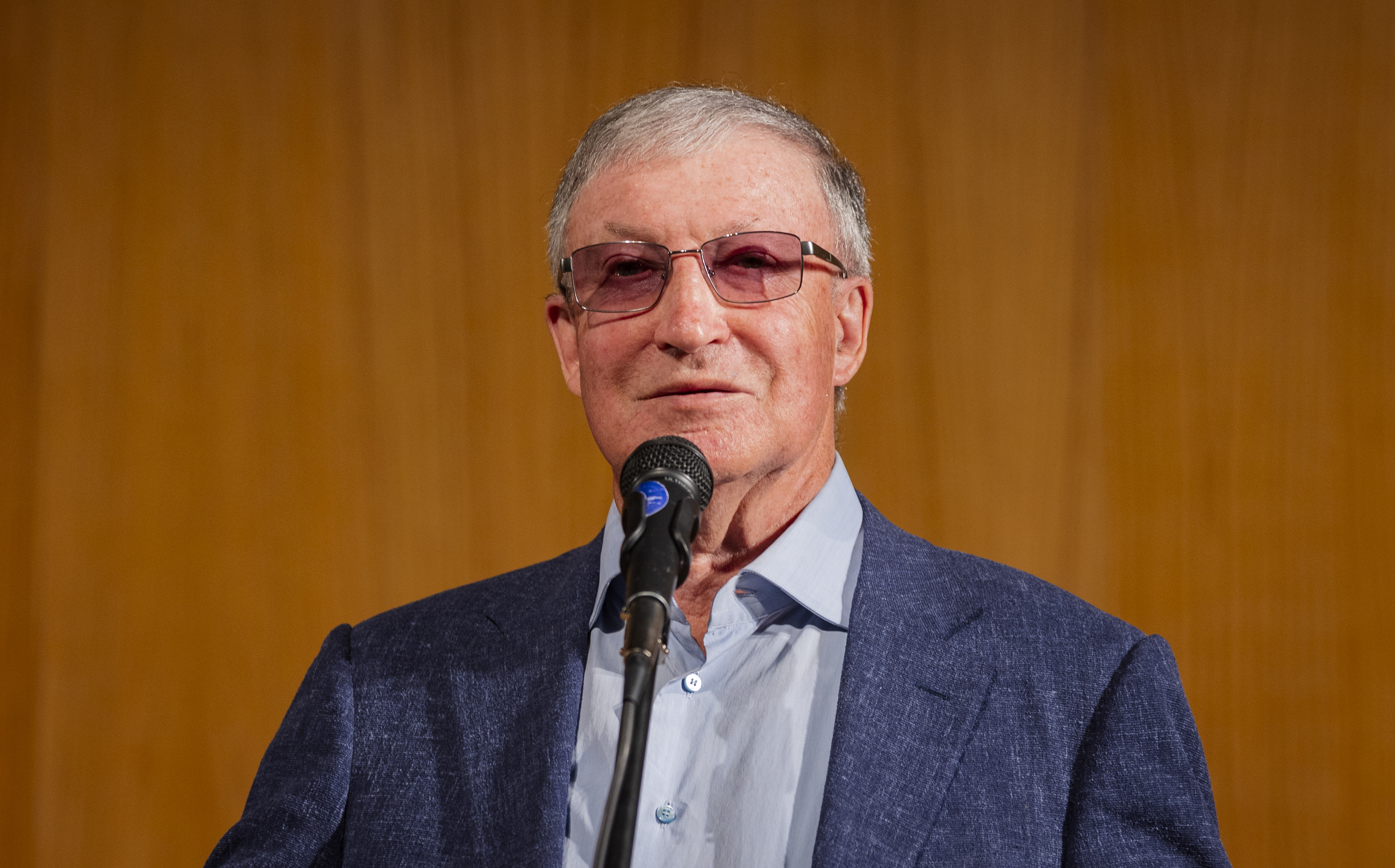
- Born: 17 January 1945 (age 81); Sverdlovsk, Russian SFSR
- Citizenship: Soviet Union; Russia
- Occupations: satirist, screenwriter, comedian, director, playwright
- Years active: 1971–present

Semyon Altov (Russian: Семён Альтов) (born January 17, 1945) is a Soviet comedy writer. Original name: Semyon Teodorovich Altshuller (Russian: Семён Теодо́рович Альтшуллер).

== Personal life ==
Semyon Altov was born in Sverdlovsk. The same year the family moved to Leningrad, where Semyon Altov spent his whole life.

== Awards ==
- 2003: Honored Artist of the Russian Federation
