= Franz Altschuler =

German artist and illustrator

- Born: 1923; Mannheim, Germany
- Died: December 12, 2009 (aged 85–86)
- Education: László Moholy-Nagy
- Known for: Illustration
- Movement: Constructivism

Franz Altschuler (1923 – December 12, 2009) was a German artist and illustrator who drew for Playboy, textbooks and newspapers, but also worked with fine art and drawing. Born in Mannheim, Germany, Altschuler and his family emigrated to the US when he was a teenager. He moved to Chicago in 1946 as a student of the renowned painter, photographer and Bauhaus design professor László Moholy-Nagy at the Illinois Institute of Technology's Institute of Design.
