= Lori L. Altshuler =

American psychiatrist (1957–2015)

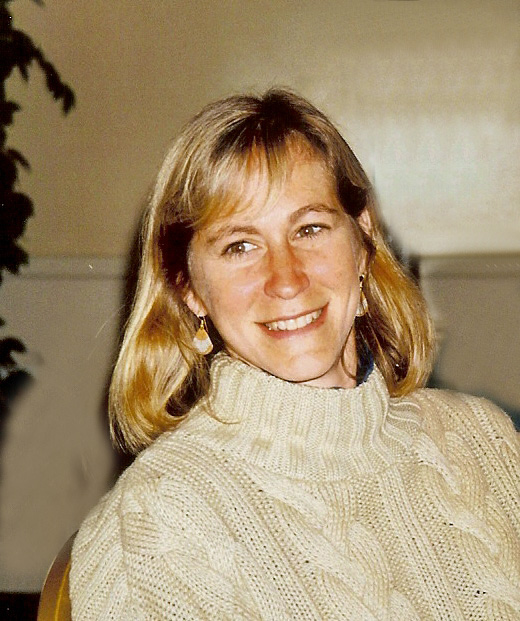
- Altshuler in 1997
- Born: August 23, 1957; Englewood, New Jersey
- Died: November 5, 2015 (aged 58); Manhattan Beach, California
- Medical career
- Institutions: National Institute of Mental Health; University of California, Los Angeles education = Cornell University

Lori Altshuler (August 23, 1957 – November 5, 2015) was a professor at the University of California, Los Angeles (UCLA) Department of Psychiatry and Biobehavioral Sciences and held the Julia S. Gouw Endowed Chair for Mood Disorders. She joined the UCLA Department of Psychiatry faculty in 1989.
