= Fidelity Union Life Insurance Company =

American Insurance company

- Industry: Insurance
- Founded: 1925
- Founder: Carr Collins, Sr. William Morriss
- Headquarters: Dallas, Texas

Fidelity Union Life Insurance Company is an insurance company based in Dallas, Texas. In 2012, it had assets in excess of $19 billion. The high-rise residential building known as Mosaic Dallas originally served as its corporate offices. It was founded in 1925 by Carr Collins, Sr. and William Morriss. It was acquired by Allianz in 1979.
