= Vasilyevsky (rural locality) =

Vasilyevsky (Russian: Васи́льевский; masculine), Vasilyevskaya (Васи́льевская; feminine), or Vasilyevskoye (Васи́льевское; neuter) is the name of several rural localities in Russia.

== Republic of Bashkortostan ==
As of 2010, one rural locality in the Republic of Bashkortostan bears this name:

- Vasilyevsky, Republic of Bashkortostan, a khutor in Mrakovsky Selsoviet of Kugarchinsky District

== Irkutsk Oblast ==
As of 2010, two rural localities in Irkutsk Oblast bear this name:

- Vasilyevsky, Irkutsk Oblast, a settlement in Bodaybinsky District
- Vasilyevskoye, Irkutsk Oblast, a village in Nukutsky District

== Ivanovo Oblast ==
As of 2010, three rural localities in Ivanovo Oblast bear this name:

- Vasilyevskoye, Ivanovsky District, Ivanovo Oblast, a village in Ivanovsky District
- Vasilyevskoye, Privolzhsky District, Ivanovo Oblast, a village in Privolzhsky District
- Vasilyevskoye, Shuysky District, Ivanovo Oblast, a selo in Shuysky District

== Kaluga Oblast ==
As of 2010, three rural localities in Kaluga Oblast bear this name:

- Vasilyevskoye, Dzerzhinsky District, Kaluga Oblast, a village in Dzerzhinsky District
- Vasilyevskoye, Medynsky District, Kaluga Oblast, a village in Medynsky District
- Vasilyevskoye, Mosalsky District, Kaluga Oblast, a village in Mosalsky District

== Kirov Oblast ==
As of 2010, three rural localities in Kirov Oblast bear this name:

- Vasilyevsky, Kirov Oblast, a settlement under the administrative jurisdiction of the town of Omutninsk, Omutninsky District
- Vasilyevskoye, Kirov Oblast, a selo in Vasilyevsky Rural Okrug of Nemsky District
- Vasilyevskaya, Kirov Oblast, a village in Ichetovkinsky Rural Okrug of Afanasyevsky District

== Kostroma Oblast ==
As of 2010, six rural localities in Kostroma Oblast bear this name:

- Vasilyevskoye, Buysky District, Kostroma Oblast, a village in Tsentralnoye Settlement of Buysky District
- Vasilyevskoye, Chukhlomsky District, Kostroma Oblast, a village in Nozhkinskoye Settlement of Chukhlomsky District
- Vasilyevskoye, Dmitriyevskoye Settlement, Galichsky District, Kostroma Oblast, a village in Dmitriyevskoye Settlement of Galichsky District
- Vasilyevskoye, Orekhovskoye Settlement, Galichsky District, Kostroma Oblast, a village in Orekhovskoye Settlement of Galichsky District
- Vasilyevskoye, Manturovsky District, Kostroma Oblast, a village in Podvigalikhinskoye Settlement of Manturovsky District
- Vasilyevskoye, Sharyinsky District, Kostroma Oblast, a village in Ivanovskoye Settlement of Sharyinsky District

== Kursk Oblast ==
As of 2010, one rural locality in Kursk Oblast bears this name:

- Vasilyevsky, Kursk Oblast, a settlement in Krasnoznamensky Selsoviet of Kastorensky District

== Leningrad Oblast ==
As of 2010, one rural locality in Leningrad Oblast bears this name:

- Vasilyevskaya, Leningrad Oblast, a village in Vinnitskoye Settlement Municipal Formation of Podporozhsky District

== Mari El Republic ==
As of 2010, one rural locality in the Mari El Republic bears this name:

- Vasilyevskoye, Mari El Republic, a selo in Vasilyevsky Rural Okrug of Yurinsky District

== Moscow Oblast ==
As of 2010, ten rural localities in Moscow Oblast bear this name:

- Vasilyevskoye, Kolyubakinskoye Rural Settlement, Ruzsky District, Moscow Oblast, a village in Kolyubakinskoye Rural Settlement of Ruzsky District
- Vasilyevskoye, Volkovskoye Rural Settlement, Ruzsky District, Moscow Oblast, a village in Volkovskoye Rural Settlement of Ruzsky District
- Vasilyevskoye, Serebryano-Prudsky District, Moscow Oblast, a village in Uzunovskoye Rural Settlement of Serebryano-Prudsky District
- Vasilyevskoye, Sergiyevo-Posadsky District, Moscow Oblast, a selo in Vasilyevskoye Rural Settlement of Sergiyevo-Posadsky District
- Vasilyevskoye, Serpukhovsky District, Moscow Oblast, a village in Vasilyevskoye Rural Settlement of Serpukhovsky District
- Vasilyevskoye, Shakhovskoy District, Moscow Oblast, a village in Ramenskoye Rural Settlement of Shakhovskoy District
- Vasilyevskoye, Shchyolkovsky District, Moscow Oblast, a village under the administrative jurisdiction of the town of Shchyolkovo, Shchyolkovsky District
- Vasilyevskoye, Stupinsky District, Moscow Oblast, a selo under the administrative jurisdiction of the work settlement of Malino, Stupinsky District
- Vasilyevskoye, Chismenskoye Rural Settlement, Volokolamsky District, Moscow Oblast, a village in Chismenskoye Rural Settlement of Volokolamsky District
- Vasilyevskoye, Yaropoletskoye Rural Settlement, Volokolamsky District, Moscow Oblast, a village in Yaropoletskoye Rural Settlement of Volokolamsky District

== Nizhny Novgorod Oblast ==
As of 2010, two rural localities in Nizhny Novgorod Oblast bear this name:

- Vasilyevskoye, Gorodetsky District, Nizhny Novgorod Oblast, a village in Timiryazevsky Selsoviet of Gorodetsky District
- Vasilyevskoye, Voskresensky District, Nizhny Novgorod Oblast, a village in Nakhratovsky Selsoviet of Voskresensky District

== Novgorod Oblast ==
As of 2010, one rural locality in Novgorod Oblast bears this name:

- Vasilyevskoye, Novgorod Oblast, a village in Rakomskoye Settlement of Novgorodsky District

== Novosibirsk Oblast ==
As of 2010, one rural locality in Novosibirsk Oblast bears this name:

- Vasilyevsky, Novosibirsk Oblast, a settlement in Chulymsky District

== Oryol Oblast ==
As of 2010, three rural localities in Oryol Oblast bear this name:

- Vasilyevsky, Bolkhovsky District, Oryol Oblast, a settlement in Novosinetsky Selsoviet of Bolkhovsky District
- Vasilyevsky, Dmitrovsky District, Oryol Oblast, a settlement in Dolbenkinsky Selsoviet of Dmitrovsky District
- Vasilyevsky, Verkhovsky District, Oryol Oblast, a settlement in Vasilyevsky Selsoviet of Verkhovsky District

== Perm Krai ==
As of 2010, one rural locality in Perm Krai bears this name:

- Vasilyevskoye, Perm Krai, a selo in Ilyinsky District

== Pskov Oblast ==
As of 2010, two rural localities in Pskov Oblast bear this name:

- Vasilyevskoye, Loknyansky District, Pskov Oblast, a village in Loknyansky District
- Vasilyevskoye, Pushkinogorsky District, Pskov Oblast, a village in Pushkinogorsky District

== Rostov Oblast ==
As of 2010, two rural localities in Rostov Oblast bear this name:

- Vasilyevsky, Belokalitvinsky District, Rostov Oblast, a khutor in Ilyinskoye Rural Settlement of Belokalitvinsky District
- Vasilyevsky, Kamensky District, Rostov Oblast, a settlement in Bogdanovskoye Rural Settlement of Kamensky District

== Saratov Oblast ==
As of 2010, one rural locality in Saratov Oblast bears this name:

- Vasilyevsky, Saratov Oblast, a settlement in Kalininsky District

== Smolensk Oblast ==
As of 2010, three rural localities in Smolensk Oblast bear this name:

- Vasilyevskoye, Gagarinsky District, Smolensk Oblast, a selo in Sergo-Ivanovskoye Rural Settlement of Gagarinsky District
- Vasilyevskoye, Safonovsky District, Smolensk Oblast, a selo in Vasilyevskoye Rural Settlement of Safonovsky District
- Vasilyevskoye, Tyomkinsky District, Smolensk Oblast, a village in Vasilyevskoye Rural Settlement of Tyomkinsky District

== Stavropol Krai ==
As of 2010, one rural locality in Stavropol Krai bears this name:

- Vasilyevsky, Stavropol Krai, a khutor in Vasilyevsky Selsoviet of Kochubeyevsky District

== Tver Oblast ==
As of 2010, six rural localities in Tver Oblast bear this name:

- Vasilyevskoye, Kalininsky District, Tver Oblast, a selo in Kalininsky District
- Vasilyevskoye, Kashinsky District, Tver Oblast, a village in Kashinsky District
- Vasilyevskoye, Selizharovsky District, Tver Oblast, a village in Selizharovsky District
- Vasilyevskoye (Novo-Yamskoye Rural Settlement), Staritsky District, Tver Oblast, a village in Staritsky District; municipally, a part of Novo-Yamskoye Rural Settlement of that district
- Vasilyevskoye (Vasilyevskoye Rural Settlement), Staritsky District, Tver Oblast, a village in Staritsky District; municipally, a part of Vasilyevskoye Rural Settlement of that district
- Vasilyevskoye, Zubtsovsky District, Tver Oblast, a village in Zubtsovsky District

== Udmurt Republic ==
As of 2010, one rural locality in the Udmurt Republic bears this name:

- Vasilyevskoye, Udmurt Republic, a selo in Vasilyevsky Selsoviet of Krasnogorsky District

== Vladimir Oblast ==
As of 2010, one rural locality in Vladimir Oblast bears this name:

- Vasilyevsky, Vladimir Oblast, a settlement in Melenkovsky District

== Volgograd Oblast ==
As of 2010, one rural locality in Volgograd Oblast bears this name:

- Vasilyevsky, Volgograd Oblast, a khutor in Semichensky Selsoviet of Kotelnikovsky District

== Vologda Oblast ==
As of 2010, fifteen rural localities in Vologda Oblast bear this name:

- Vasilyevskoye, Babayevsky District, Vologda Oblast, a village in Toropovsky Selsoviet of Babayevsky District
- Vasilyevskoye, Domozerovsky Selsoviet, Cherepovetsky District, Vologda Oblast, a village in Domozerovsky Selsoviet of Cherepovetsky District
- Vasilyevskoye, Klimovsky Selsoviet, Cherepovetsky District, Vologda Oblast, a village in Klimovsky Selsoviet of Cherepovetsky District
- Vasilyevskoye, Shchetinsky Selsoviet, Cherepovetsky District, Vologda Oblast, a village in Shchetinsky Selsoviet of Cherepovetsky District
- Vasilyevskoye, Sheksninsky District, Vologda Oblast, a village in Ugolsky Selsoviet of Sheksninsky District
- Vasilyevskoye, Sokolsky District, Vologda Oblast, a village in Chuchkovsky Selsoviet of Sokolsky District
- Vasilyevskoye, Velikoustyugsky District, Vologda Oblast, a selo in Krasavinsky Selsoviet of Velikoustyugsky District
- Vasilyevskoye, Vologodsky District, Vologda Oblast, a settlement in Markovsky Selsoviet of Vologodsky District
- Vasilyevskaya, Kaduysky District, Vologda Oblast, a village in Nikolsky Selsoviet of Kaduysky District
- Vasilyevskaya, Kichmengsko-Gorodetsky District, Vologda Oblast, a village in Nizhneyenangsky Selsoviet of Kichmengsko-Gorodetsky District
- Vasilyevskaya, Ramensky Selsoviet, Syamzhensky District, Vologda Oblast, a village in Ramensky Selsoviet of Syamzhensky District
- Vasilyevskaya, Zhityevsky Selsoviet, Syamzhensky District, Vologda Oblast, a village in Zhityevsky Selsoviet of Syamzhensky District
- Vasilyevskaya, Vashkinsky District, Vologda Oblast, a village in Vasilyevsky Selsoviet of Vashkinsky District
- Vasilyevskaya, Maryinsky Selsoviet, Vozhegodsky District, Vologda Oblast, a village in Maryinsky Selsoviet of Vozhegodsky District
- Vasilyevskaya, Mityukovsky Selsoviet, Vozhegodsky District, Vologda Oblast, a village in Mityukovsky Selsoviet of Vozhegodsky District

== Voronezh Oblast ==
As of 2010, one rural locality in Voronezh Oblast bears this name:

- Vasilyevsky, Voronezh Oblast, a settlement in Vasilyevskoye Rural Settlement of Talovsky District

== Yaroslavl Oblast ==
As of 2010, eight rural localities in Yaroslavl Oblast bear this name:

- Vasilyevskoye, Borovskoy Rural Okrug, Nekrasovsky District, Yaroslavl Oblast, a village in Borovskoy Rural Okrug of Nekrasovsky District
- Vasilyevskoye, Levashovsky Rural Okrug, Nekrasovsky District, Yaroslavl Oblast, a village in Levashovsky Rural Okrug of Nekrasovsky District
- Vasilyevskoye, Pervomaysky District, Yaroslavl Oblast, a village in Prechistensky Rural Okrug of Pervomaysky District
- Vasilyevskoye, Poshekhonsky District, Yaroslavl Oblast, a village in Vasilyevsky Rural Okrug of Poshekhonsky District
- Vasilyevskoye, Rybinsky District, Yaroslavl Oblast, a village in Mikhaylovsky Rural Okrug of Rybinsky District
- Vasilyevskoye, Kurbsky Rural Okrug, Yaroslavsky District, Yaroslavl Oblast, a selo in Kurbsky Rural Okrug of Yaroslavsky District
- Vasilyevskoye, Kuznechikhinsky Rural Okrug, Yaroslavsky District, Yaroslavl Oblast, a village in Kuznechikhinsky Rural Okrug of Yaroslavsky District
- Vasilyevskaya, Yaroslavl Oblast, a village in Povodnevsky Rural Okrug of Myshkinsky District
