= Vasilevski =

Vasilevski is a surname. Notable people with the surname include:

- Alexei Vasilevski (b. 1980), Russian figure skater
- Andrei Vasilevski (ice hockey b. 1966), Russian ice hockey goaltender
- Andrei Vasilevski (ice hockey b. 1994), Russian ice hockey goaltender
- Andrei Vasilevski (tennis) (b. 1991), Belarusian tennis player
- Daniel Vasilevski (b. 1981), Australian soccer player

== See also ==
- Vasilevsky (disambiguation)
