= Vasilevsky =

Vasilevsky, also transliterated as Vasilievsky or Vasilyevsky, is a Russian surname (Russian: Василе́вский) or place name (Васи́льевский), derived from the given name Vasily. It may refer to:

== Places ==
- Vasilyevsky Island, an island in Saint Petersburg in the delta of the river Neva bordered by the Gulf of Finland
- Vasilyevsky, the name of several rural localities of Russia

== People ==
- Aleksandr Vasilevsky (1895–1977), Soviet Red Army Marshal, Chief of the General Staff, and Defense Minister (1949–1953)
- Alexander Vasilevski (born 1975), Ukrainian professional ice hockey player
- Alexei Vasilevsky (born 1980), Russian figure skater
- Alexei Vasilevsky (born 1993), Russian hockey player
- Alyaksey Vasilewski (born 1993), Belarusian professional football (soccer) player
- Andrei Vasilevski (born 1966), former Russian goaltender
- Andrei Vasilevski (born 1991), Belarusian professional tennis player
- Andrei Vasilevskiy (born 1994), professional ice hockey goaltender for the Tampa Bay Lightning
- Daniel Vasilevski (born 1981), Australian football (soccer) player of Macedonian heritage (senior career from 1999)
- Hryhory Vasylivsky (died 1921), Ukrainian military commander in the Revolutionary Insurgent Army of Ukraine
- Lev Vasilevsky (also known as Leonid A. Tarasov; 1904–1979), KGB Resident in Mexico City during the Manhattan Project
- Pyotr Vasilevsky (1956–2012), Belarusian football player (1973–1985) and manager (1989–1991)
- Vasily Vasilievsky (1838–1899), Russian historian who founded the St. Petersburg school of medieval studies
- Vyacheslav Vasilevsky (born 1988), Russian mixed martial arts fighter
