= Andrei Vasilevski =

Andrei Vasilevski may refer to:

- Andrei Vasilevski (ice hockey, born 1966), Russian ice hockey goaltender
- Andrei Vasilevskiy (born 1994), Russian ice hockey goaltender and son of the former
- Andrei Vasilevski (tennis) (born 1991), Belarusian tennis player
