= Alexander Vasilevsky =

Alexander Vasilevsky, Alexei Vasilevski, or variants may refer to:

- Aleksandr Vasilevsky (1895–1977), Marshal of the Soviet Union
- Alex Vasilevsky (software developer) (1961–2010), co-founder of Virtual Iron
- Alexander Vasilevski (ice hockey, born 1975), Ukrainian former NHL ice hockey forward
- Alexei Vasilevsky (figure skater) (born 1980), Russian figure skater
- Alexei Vasilevsky (ice hockey, born 1993), Russian ice hockey defenceman
