= Nikita Tryamkin =

Russian ice hockey player (born 1994)

- Born: 30 August 1994 (age 32) Yekaterinburg, Russia
- Height: 6 ft 7 in (201 cm)
- Weight: 265 lb (120 kg; 18 st 13 lb)
- Position: Defence
- Shoots: Left
- KHL team Former teams: Avtomobilist Yekaterinburg; Vancouver Canucks
- National team: Russia
- NHL draft: 66th overall, 2014; Vancouver Canucks
- Playing career: 2012–present

Nikita Andreyevich Tryamkin (Russian: Никита Андреевич Трямкин; born 30 August 1994) is a Russian professional ice hockey defenceman for the Avtomobilist Yekaterinburg of the Kontinental Hockey League (KHL). Tryamkin made his KHL debut playing with Avtomobilist Yekaterinburg during the 2012–13 KHL season. He was selected by the Vancouver Canucks of the National Hockey League (NHL) in the 2014 NHL entry draft and briefly played with the team.

== Playing career ==
During the 2014 NHL entry draft, Tryamkin was selected 66th overall by the Vancouver Canucks. On 8 March 2016, the Canucks signed Tryamkin to a two-year entry-level deal. In this deal, Tryamkin had the option of going back to Russia and not the American Hockey League (AHL) if he did not make the Canucks in the following season. He immediately joined the Canucks for the remainder of the 2015–16 season, and on 16 March 2016, Tryamkin made his NHL debut against the Colorado Avalanche and registered his first NHL point assisting on Henrik Sedin's goal. On 7 April, Tryamkin scored his first career NHL goal against Calgary Flames goaltender Joni Ortio.

Tryamkin made the Canucks 2016–17 season-opening roster but was unable to draw into the lineup. The Canucks reportedly attempted to send him to their AHL affiliate, the Utica Comets, but Tryamkin declined – using his contract option in forcing them to keep him on their roster or allow him to return to Russia. Tryamkin eventually made his season debut on 3 November, after being a healthy scratch in the team's first ten games of the season. Tryamkin remained in the defence corps for the remainder of the season, appearing in 66 games for two goals and nine points.

Unhappy with his role and ice-time within the Canucks blueline, as a restricted free agent, he turned down a two-year contract with Vancouver and on 20 April 2017 it was announced that Tryamkin was returning to Russia to play for Avtomobilist Yekaterinburg. On 9 March 2025, Tryamkin signed a three-year contract extension with Avtomobilist.

== Career statistics ==
=== Regular season and playoffs ===
| | | | Regular season | | | | | Playoffs |
| Season | Team | League | GP | G | A | Pts | PIM | GP | G | A | Pts | PIM |
|---|---|---|---|---|---|---|---|---|---|---|---|---|
| 2011–12 | JHC Avto | MHL | 60 | 3 | 9 | 12 | 82 | 9 | 0 | 0 | 0 | 8 |
| 2012–13 | JHC Avto | MHL | 28 | 8 | 10 | 18 | 58 | 8 | 1 | 2 | 3 | 40 |
| 2012–13 | Avtomobilist Yekaterinburg | KHL | 32 | 3 | 1 | 4 | 12 | — | — | — | — | — |
| 2013–14 | JHC Avto | MHL | 2 | 2 | 1 | 3 | 4 | 1 | 0 | 0 | 0 | 0 |
| 2013–14 | Avtomobilist Yekaterinburg | KHL | 45 | 1 | 6 | 7 | 38 | 4 | 0 | 0 | 0 | 2 |
| 2014–15 | JHC Avto | MHL | 3 | 1 | 3 | 4 | 8 | 1 | 0 | 0 | 0 | 12 |
| 2014–15 | Avtomobilist Yekaterinburg | KHL | 58 | 1 | 5 | 6 | 37 | 5 | 0 | 0 | 0 | 12 |
| 2015–16 | Avtomobilist Yekaterinburg | KHL | 53 | 4 | 7 | 11 | 71 | 6 | 0 | 1 | 1 | 4 |
| 2015–16 | Vancouver Canucks | NHL | 13 | 1 | 1 | 2 | 10 | — | — | — | — | — |
| 2016–17 | Vancouver Canucks | NHL | 66 | 2 | 7 | 9 | 64 | — | — | — | — | — |
| 2017–18 | Avtomobilist Yekaterinburg | KHL | 51 | 9 | 16 | 25 | 109 | 6 | 0 | 0 | 0 | 4 |
| 2018–19 | Avtomobilist Yekaterinburg | KHL | 41 | 3 | 8 | 11 | 31 | 9 | 0 | 2 | 2 | 6 |
| 2019–20 | Avtomobilist Yekaterinburg | KHL | 58 | 2 | 9 | 11 | 61 | 5 | 0 | 2 | 2 | 2 |
| 2020–21 | Avtomobilist Yekaterinburg | KHL | 60 | 3 | 12 | 15 | 53 | 5 | 1 | 1 | 2 | 0 |
| 2021–22 | Avtomobilist Yekaterinburg | KHL | 45 | 2 | 7 | 9 | 26 | — | — | — | — | — |
| 2022–23 | Avtomobilist Yekaterinburg | KHL | 64 | 2 | 9 | 11 | 50 | 7 | 0 | 0 | 0 | 0 |
| 2023–24 | Avtomobilist Yekaterinburg | KHL | 67 | 1 | 13 | 14 | 42 | 17 | 1 | 3 | 4 | 16 |
| 2024–25 | Avtomobilist Yekaterinburg | KHL | 65 | 3 | 10 | 13 | 39 | 7 | 0 | 2 | 2 | 4 |
| 2025–26 | Avtomobilist Yekaterinburg | KHL | 39 | 5 | 8 | 13 | 73 | 6 | 0 | 0 | 0 | 9 |
| KHL totals | | | 678 | 39 | 111 | 150 | 642 | 77 | 2 | 11 | 13 | 59 |
| NHL totals | | | 79 | 3 | 8 | 11 | 74 | — | — | — | — | — |

=== International ===
| Year | Team | Event | Result | GP | G | A | Pts | PIM |
|---|---|---|---|---|---|---|---|---|
| 2014 | Russia | WJC | 3rd place, bronze medalist(s) | 7 | 1 | 2 | 3 | 2 |
| 2018 | Russia | WC | 6th | 6 | 0 | 1 | 1 | 4 |
| Junior totals | | | | 7 | 1 | 2 | 3 | 2 |
| Senior totals | | | | 6 | 0 | 1 | 1 | 4 |
