= Ivan Teterin =

Russian ice hockey player

- Born: December 2, 1995 (age 29); Tyumen, Russia
- Height: 5 ft 10 in (178 cm)
- Weight: 205 lb (93 kg; 14 st 9 lb)
- Position: Defence
- Shoots: Left
- KHL team: Avtomobilist Yekaterinburg
- Playing career: 2013–present

Ivan Teterin (born December 2, 1995) is a Russian professional ice hockey defenceman. He is currently playing with Avtomobilist Yekaterinburg of the Kontinental Hockey League (KHL).

Teterin made his Kontinental Hockey League debut playing with Avtomobilist Yekaterinburg during the 2013–14 KHL season.
