= Anatolii Golyshev =

Russian ice hockey player

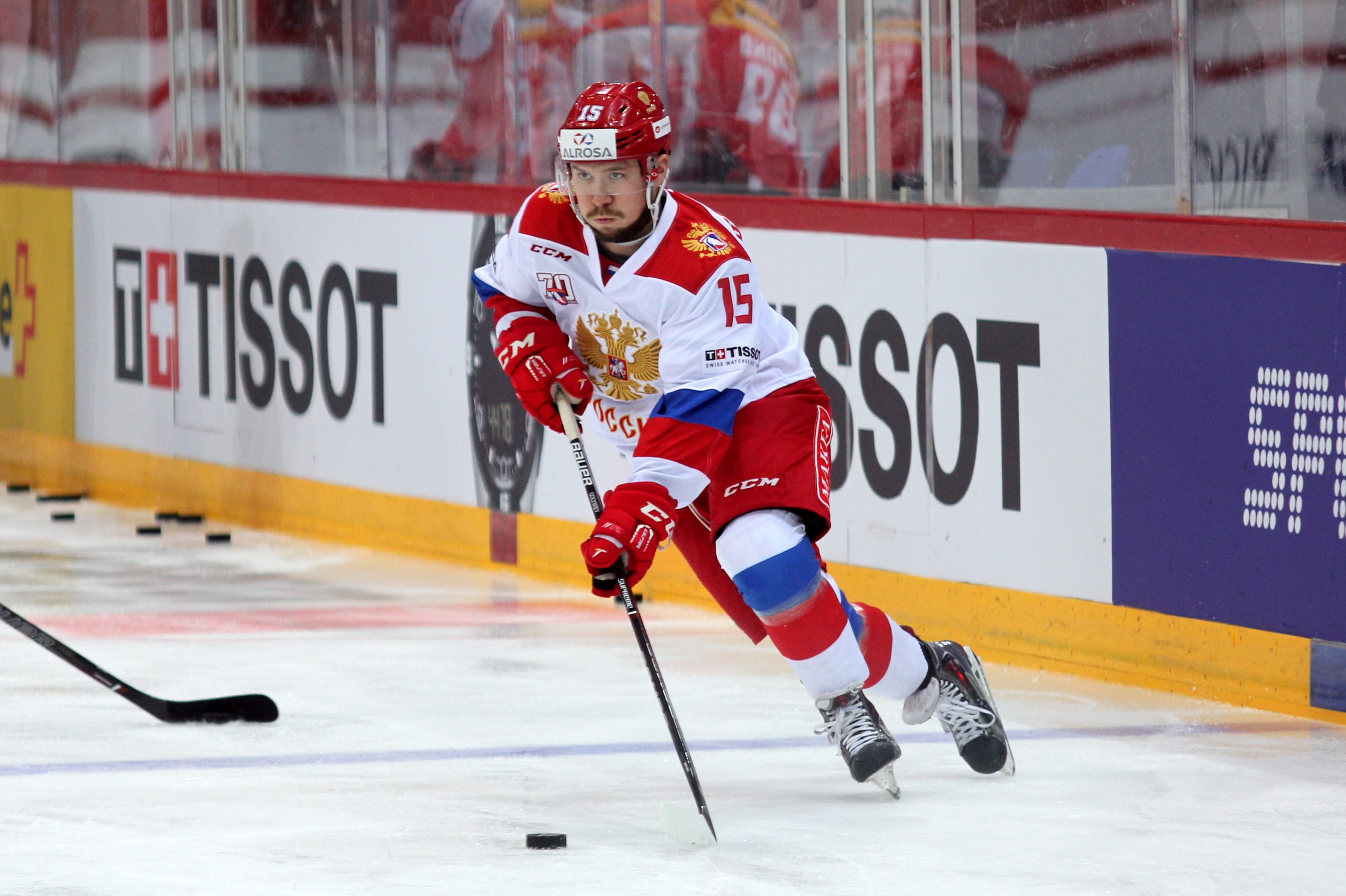
- Born: 14 February 1995 (age 31) Perm, Russia
- Height: 5 ft 9 in (175 cm)
- Weight: 189 lb (86 kg; 13 st 7 lb)
- Position: Right wing
- Shoots: Left
- KHL team Former teams: Avtomobilist Yekaterinburg; Bridgeport Islanders
- NHL draft: 95th overall, 2016; New York Islanders
- Playing career: 2013–present

Anatolii Gennadievich Golyshev (Russian: Анатолий Геннадьевич Голышев; born 14 February 1995) is a Russian professional ice hockey forward for Avtomobilist Yekaterinburg of the Kontinental Hockey League (KHL). He was selected by the New York Islanders in the fourth round, 95th overall, of the 2016 NHL entry draft.

== Playing career ==
Golyshev played as a youth within hometown club, Molot Perm, before joining Avtomobilist Yekaterinburg as a junior in the 2012–13 season. Golyshev made his professional debut in the Kontinental Hockey League with Yekaterinburg during the following 2013-14 season.

Having been the longest tenured player in completing his eighth season with Avtomobilist Yekaterinburg in the 2020–21 season, placing fifth in team scoring with 27 points through 53 games, Golyshev left the club following a first-round exit to Avangard Omsk.

With the New York Islanders still in possession of his NHL rights, Golyshev was signed to a one-year, two-way contract to immediately join the division-leading club during the pandemic-delayed 2020–21 season on 20 March 2021. He remained on the roster throughout the Islander playoffs push to the semi-finals, without featuring in a game.

As a restricted free agent, Golyshev agreed to terms on a one-year, $750,000 contract with the Islanders on 23 September 2021. After attending the Islanders 2021 training camp, Golyshev having left a positive impression, was assigned to begin the 2021–22 season with American Hockey League affiliate, the Bridgeport Islanders. Golyshev posted 5 goals through 15 games with Bridgeport before he was recalled to the Islanders through the club's crisis with COVID-19 amongst the roster. Returned to the AHL without featuring with New York, Golyshev, seeing limited opportunity, opted to be placed on unconditional waivers to mutually terminate his contract with the Islanders on 8 December 2021. On 14 December, Golyshev signed a contract until the end of the 2021–22 season with Avtomobilist Yekaterinburg.

== Career statistics ==
=== Regular season and playoffs ===
			Regular season					Playoffs
Season	Team	League	GP	G	A	Pts	PIM	GP	G	A	Pts	PIM
2012–13	Avto Yekaterinburg	MHL	54	23	40	63	24	8	1	5	6	2
2013–14	Avto Yekaterinburg	MHL	20	12	10	22	8	1	1	1	2	0
2013–14	Avtomobilist Yekaterinburg	KHL	32	2	3	5	4	4	0	0	0	0
2014–15	Avtomobilist Yekaterinburg	KHL	44	9	10	19	43	5	1	1	2	6
2014–15	Avto Yekaterinburg	MHL	—	—	—	—	—	1	0	0	0	0
2015–16	Avtomobilist Yekaterinburg	KHL	56	25	19	44	26	6	1	0	1	10
2016–17	Avtomobilist Yekaterinburg	KHL	49	7	10	17	59	—	—	—	—	—
2016–17	Sputnik Nizhny Tagil	VHL	4	1	0	1	0	—	—	—	—	—
2017–18	Avtomobilist Yekaterinburg	KHL	40	18	13	31	16	6	2	1	3	4
2018–19	Avtomobilist Yekaterinburg	KHL	54	19	21	40	14	9	2	3	5	12
2019–20	Avtomobilist Yekaterinburg	KHL	38	11	14	25	25	2	0	1	1	2
2019–20	Gornyak Uchaly	VHL	3	0	1	1	4	—	—	—	—	—
2020–21	Avtomobilist Yekaterinburg	KHL	53	12	15	27	28	3	0	0	0	0
2021–22	Bridgeport Islanders	AHL	15	5	2	7	10	—	—	—	—	—
2021–22	Avtomobilist Yekaterinburg	KHL	6	1	1	2	4	—	—	—	—	—
2022–23	Avtomobilist Yekaterinburg	KHL	54	16	24	40	14	7	0	4	4	2
2023–24	Avtomobilist Yekaterinburg	KHL	62	10	23	33	8	16	9	9	18	2
2024–25	Avtomobilist Yekaterinburg	KHL	52	13	23	36	22	7	1	1	2	2
2025–26	Avtomobilist Yekaterinburg	KHL	41	9	8	17	10	5	1	3	4	2
KHL totals			581	152	184	336	273	70	17	23	40	42

Medal record

Representing Russia

Ice hockey

World Junior Championships
Silver medal – second place	2015 Canada	

=== International ===
Year	Team	Event	Result	GP	G	A	Pts	PIM
2015	Russia	WJC	2nd place, silver medalist(s)	6	0	3	3	27
Junior totals				6	0	3	3	27

== Awards and honors ==
Award	Year
KHL
All-Star Game	2016, 2017
