= Andrei Martemyanov =

Russian ice hockey player (1963–2025)

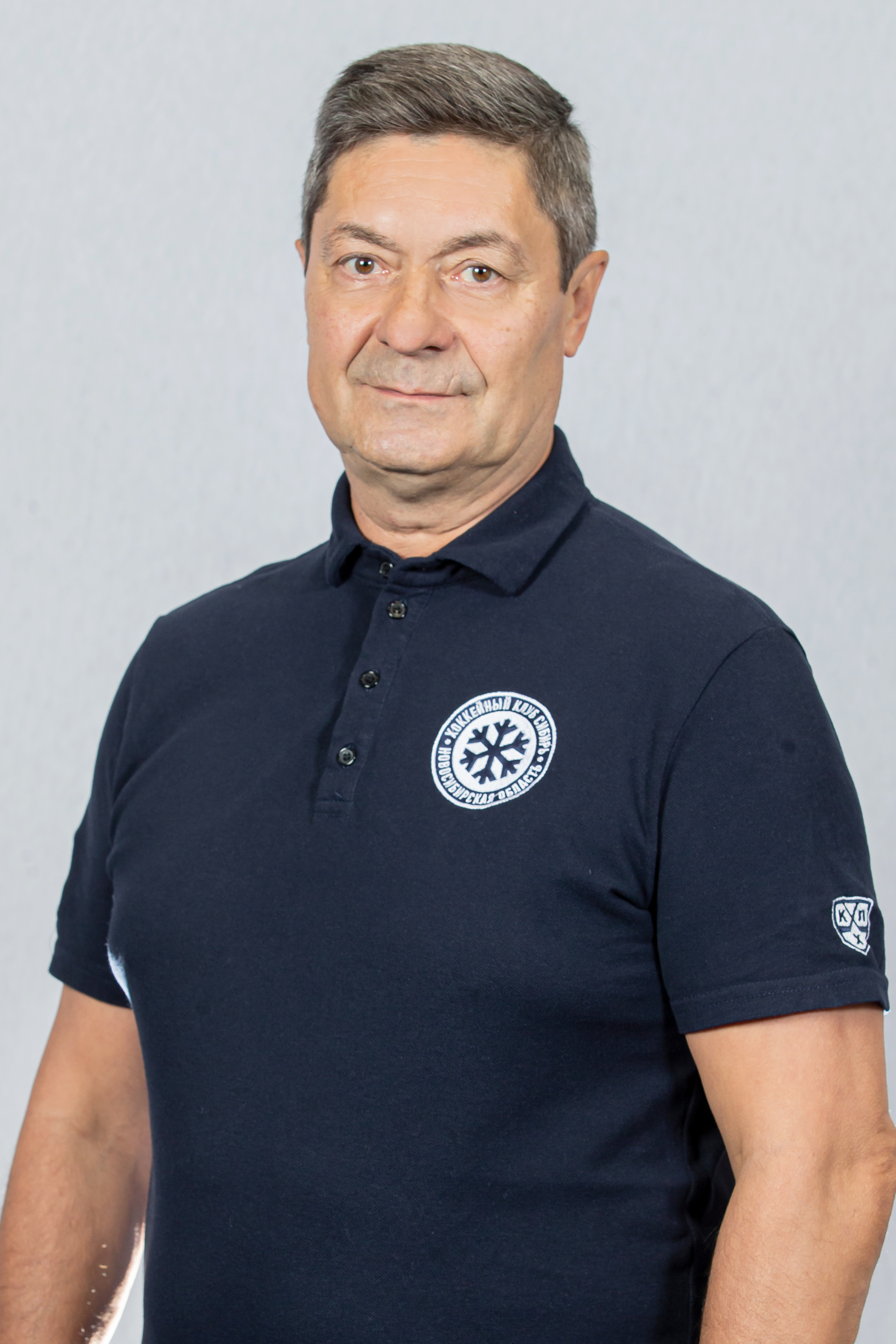
- Born: 30 March 1963; Sverdlovsk, Russian SFSR, USSR
- Died: 25 March 2025 (aged 61)
- Height: 6 ft 1/4 in (184 cm)
- Weight: 200 lb (91 kg; 14 st 4 lb)
- Position: Defence
- Shot: Left
- Played for: Dinamo-Energija Yekaterinburg; HC CSKA Moscow; HDD Olimpija Ljubljana; Metallurg Magnitogorsk; Kölner Haie; Ratinger Löwen; CSK VVS Samara
- National team: Soviet Union
- Playing career: 1981–1999

Andrei Alekseevich Martemyanov (Russian: Андре́й Алексе́евич Мартемья́нов; 30 March 1963 – 25 March 2025) was a Soviet and Russian ice hockey player and coach who was the head coach of the KHL club, Avtomobilist Yekaterinburg and HC Sibir. He was also the coach for Amur Khabarovsk until his death in March 2025.

Martemyanov played for junior and youth teams of the Soviet Union, and won the 1984 Soviet Championship League with HC CSKA Moscow. Winner of 1989 Winter Universiade.

Martemyanov died on 25 March 2025, at the age of 61.
