= Artyom Gareyev =

Russian ice hockey player (born 1992)

- Born: March 4, 1992 (age 33) Ufa, Russia
- Height: 5 ft 9 in (175 cm)
- Weight: 170 lb (77 kg; 12 st 2 lb)
- Position: Forward
- Shoots: Left
- KHL team Former teams: Free agent Salavat Yulaev Ufa; Metallurg Novokuznetsk; Avtomobilist Yekaterinburg; Severstal Cherepovets; Admiral Vladivostok
- Playing career: 2012–present

Artyom Gareyev (born March 4, 1992) is a Russian professional ice hockey player. He is currently an unrestricted free agent who most recently played with Admiral Vladivostok of the Kontinental Hockey League (KHL).

Gareyev made his Kontinental Hockey League (KHL) debut playing with Salavat Yulaev Ufa during the 2012–13 KHL season.
