= Alexei Simakov =

Russian ice hockey player

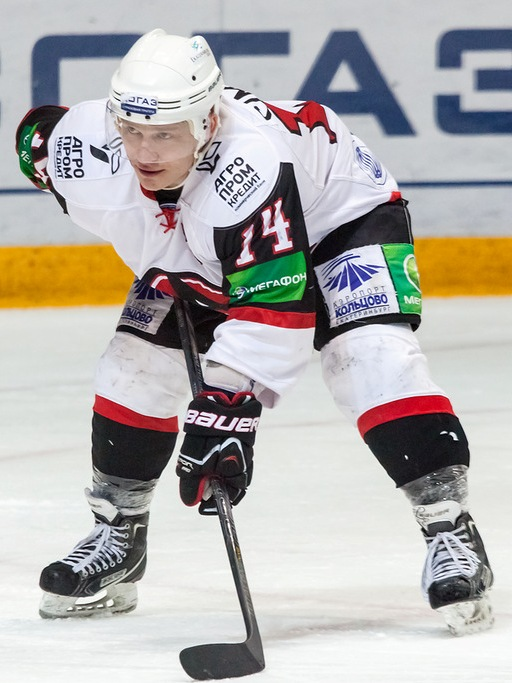
- Born: April 7, 1979 (age 46) Sverdlovsk, Russian SFSR, Soviet Union
- Height: 5 ft 6 in (168 cm)
- Weight: 174 lb (79 kg; 12 st 6 lb)
- Position: Right wing
- Shot: Left
- Played for: Neftekhimik Nizhnekamsk; Ak Bars Kazan; CSKA Moscow; Avtomobilist Yekaterinburg; SKA Saint Petersburg; Metallurg Magnitogorsk; HC Ugra
- Playing career: 1997–2019

Alexei Simakov (born April 7, 1979) is a Russian former professional ice hockey forward. He formerly played with Avtomobilist Yekaterinburg in the KHL.

Simakov made his Kontinental Hockey League debut playing with Metallurg Magnitogorsk during the inaugural 2008–09 KHL season.
