= Vadim Berdnikov =

Russian ice hockey player (born 1987)

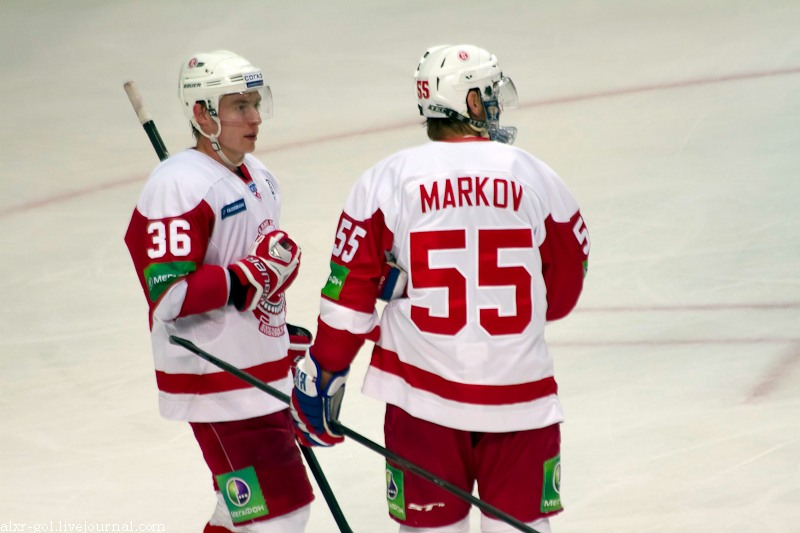
- Born: July 7, 1987 (age 38) Chelyabinsk, Russian SFSR
- Height: 5 ft 9 in (175 cm)
- Weight: 176 lb (80 kg; 12 st 8 lb)
- Position: Center
- Shoots: Left
- KHC team Former teams: Arlan Kokshetau; Traktor Chelyabinsk; Vityaz Chekhov; HC Spartak Moscow; Atlant Moscow Oblast; Severstal Cherepovets
- Playing career: 2004–present

Vadim Berdnikov (born July 7, 1987) is a Russian professional ice hockey player who currently plays for Arlan Kokshetau of the Kazakhstan Hockey Championship (KHC).
