= Avtomobilist Yekaterinburg =

Professional ice hockey club based in Yekaterinburg, Russia

- City: Yekaterinburg, Russia
- League: Kontinental Hockey League (2009–present)
- Conference: Eastern
- Division: Kharlamov
- Founded: 2006
- Home arena: UMMC Arena (capacity: 12,588)
- Colours
- General manager: Oleg Gross
- Head coach: Alexei Kudashov
- Captain: Nikita Tryamkin
- Affiliates: Gornyak-UGMK (VHL); Avto (MHL)
- Website: hc-avto.ru

HC Avtomobilist (Russian: Автомобилист Екатеринбург) is a professional ice hockey club based in Yekaterinburg, Russia. It is a member of the Kharlamov Division in the Kontinental Hockey League (KHL). The club replaced Khimik Voskresensk in the KHL in 2009.

== History ==
Founded in 2006, the team took its name from an older Yekaterinburg ice hockey club called Avtomobilist that used to play in the Soviet championship and later the International Hockey League.

== Season-by-season record ==
Note: GP = Games played, W = Wins, L = Losses, OTW = Overtime/shootout wins, OTL = Overtime/shootout losses, Pts = Points, GF = Goals for, GA = Goals against

Season	GP	W	L	OTW	OTL	Pts	GF	GA	Finish	Playoffs
2009–10	56	14	28	8	6	64	127	139	5th, Kharlamov	Lost in Conference Quarterfinals, 1-3 (Salavat Yulaev Ufa)
2010–11	54	10	31	10	3	53	134	184	6th, Kharlamov	Did not qualify
2011–12	54	9	30	7	8	49	105	165	6th, Kharlamov	Did not qualify
2012–13	52	7	32	1	12	35	104	180	6th, Kharlamov	Did not qualify
2013–14	54	22	19	7	6	86	134	125	4th, Kharlamov	Lost in Conference Quarterfinals, 0-4 (Barys Astana)
2014–15	60	21	26	5	8	81	134	147	4th, Kharlamov	Lost in Conference Quarterfinals, 1-4 (Ak Bars Kazan)
2015–16	60	21	19	9	11	92	145	158	3rd, Kharlamov	Lost in Conference Quarterfinals, 2-4 (Metallurg Magnitogorsk)
2016–17	60	19	25	6	10	79	139	165	5th, Kharlamov	Did not qualify
2017–18	56	25	17	6	8	95	165	137	4th, Kharlamov	Lost in Conference Quarterfinals, 2-4 (Metallurg Magnitogorsk)
2018–19	62	39	14	8	1	95	191	125	1st, Kharlamov	Lost in Conference Semifinals, 1-4 (Salavat Yulaev Ufa)
2019–20	62	24	19	11	8	78	168	151	2nd, Kharlamov	Lost in Conference Quarterfinals, 1-4 (Sibir Novosibirsk)
2020–21	60	24	22	6	8	68	152	154	4th, Kharlamov	Lost in Conference Quarterfinals, 1-4 (Avangard Omsk)
2021–22	45	15	21	3	6	42	127	129	5th, Kharlamov	Did not qualify
2022–23	68	30	22	7	9	83	188	172	2nd, Kharlamov	Lost in Conference Quarterfinals, 3-4 (Metallurg Magnitogorsk)
2023–24	68	26	23	11	8	82	163	157	3rd, Kharlamov	Lost in Semifinals, 3-4 (Metallurg Magnitogorsk)
2024–25	68	33	20	8	7	89	178	165	3rd, Kharlamov	Lost in Last 16, 3-4 (Ak Bars Kazan)
2025–26	68	32	24	8	4	84	206	164	3rd, Kharlamov	Lost in Last 16, 2-4 (Salavat Yulaev Ufa)

== Players and personnel ==
=== Current roster ===
Updated 29 August 2026.

No.	Nat	Player	Pos	S/G	Age	Acquired	Birthplace
18	(Russia)	Evgeny Alikin	G	L	31	2023	Perm, Russia
17	(Russia)	Alexander Barabanov	RW	L	32	2026	St. Petersburg, Russia
9	(Kazakhstan)	Jesse Blacker	D	R	35	2021	Toronto, Ontario, Canada
7	(Russia)	Yaroslav Busygin	D	L	23	2025	Korkino, Russia
19	(Russia)	Yegor Chernikov	C	L	23	2025	Nizhnevartovsk, Russia
10	(Canada)	Kale Clague	D	L	28	2026	Regina, Saskatchewan, Canada
24	(Russia)	Maxim Denezhkin	C	L	25	2022	Yaroslavl, Russia
1	(Russia)	Vladimir Galkin	G	L	26	2019	Kopeysk, Russia
15	(Russia)	Anatolii Golyshev (A)	LW	L	31	2021	Perm, Russia
92	(Belarus)	Roman Gorbunov	RW	L	29	2025	Sarov, Russia
79	(United States)	Jordan Gross	D	R	31	2026	Maple Grove, Minnesota, United States
66	(Russia)	Danil Gushchin	LW	L	24	2026	Yekaterinburg, Russia
26	(Russia)	Nikita Ishimnikov	D	R	21	2023	Snezhinsk, Russia
78	(Russia)	Alexander Kadeikin	C	L	32	2026	Elektrostal, Russia
83	(Belarus)	Daniil Karpovich	D	L	21	2024	Minsk, Belarus
89	(Russia)	Ilya Karpukhin	D	L	28	2026	Chelyabinsk, Russia
76	(Russia)	Artyom Kashtanov	C	L	21	2023	Rezh, Russia
29	(Russia)	Konstantin Khremkin	C	L	24	2024	Cherepovets, Russia
56	(Russia)	Ilya Ovchinnikov	F	L	24	2019	Chaykovsky, Russia
21	(Slovakia)	Adam Ružička	C	L	27	2026	Bratislava, Slovakia
86	(Russia)	Alexander Sharov	C	L	30	2024	Moscow, Russia
99	(Russia)	Nikita Shashkov	RW	L	27	2024	Novokuznetsk, Russia
62	(Russia)	Artyom Shchuchinov	D	L	20	2025	Nizhny Tagil, Russia
72	(Russia)	Anton Slepyshev	LW	R	32	2026	Penza, Russia
11	(Canada)	Daniel Sprong	RW	R	29	2025	Amsterdam, Netherlands
27	(Russia)	Maxim Tarasov	C	L	20	2025	Yekaterinburg, Russia
88	(Russia)	Nikita Tryamkin (C)	D	L	32	2017	Yekaterinburg, Russia
55	(Russia)	Kirill Vorobyov (A)	D	L	31	2023	Demikhovo, Russia
44	(Russia)	Dmitri Yudin	D	L	31	2025	Nizhny Tagil, Russia

=== Team captains ===
- (Russia) Alexander Gulyavtsev, 2009–11
- (Russia) Sergei Gusev, 2012–14
- (Russia) Alexei Simakov, 2014–16
- (Czech Republic) Petr Koukal, 2016–17
- (Russia) Alexei Mikhnov, 2017–18
- (Russia) Nikita Tryamkin, 2018
- (Kazakhstan) Nigel Dawes, 2018–20
- (Russia) Pavel Datsyuk, 2020–21
- (Russia) Nikita Tryamkin, 2021–22
- (Russia) Sergei Shirokov, 2022–24
- (Russia) Anatolii Golyshev, 2024–

=== Head coaches ===
- (Russia) Leonid Kiselyov, 2006
- (Russia) Vitali Krayov, 2006–07
- (Russia) Mikhail Malko, 2007
- (Russia) Sergei Shepelev, 2007–08
- (Russia) Miskhat Fakhrutdinov, 2008–09
- (Czech Republic) Marek Sykora, 2009–10
- (Russia) Evgeni Popikhin, 2010
- (Russia) Evgeni Mukhin, 2010–11
- (Russia) Ilya Byakin, 2011
- (Russia) Andrei Martemyanov, 2011–12
- (Kazakhstan) Andrei Shayanov, 2012
- (Russia) Igor Ulanov, 2012–13
- (Russia) Anatoly Emelin, 2013–15
- (Russia) Andrei Razin, 2015–16
- (Russia) Vladimir Krikunov, 2016–18
- (Russia) Andrei Martemyanov, 2018–20
- (Canada) Bill Peters, 2020–2021
- (Russia) Nikolai Zavarukhin, 2021–

== Franchise leaders ==
=== All-time KHL scoring leaders ===
These are the top-ten point-scorers in franchise history. Figures are updated after each completed KHL regular season.

Note: Pos = Position; GP = Games played; G = Goals; A = Assists; Pts = Points; P/G = Points per game; = current Avtomobilist player

Points
Player	Pos	GP	G	A	Pts	P/G
(Russia) Anatoly Golyshev	RW	581	152	184	336	0.57
(Germany) Brooks Macek	RW	403	155	134	289	0.71
(France) Stephane Da Costa	C	328	103	186	289	0.88
(Russia) Alexei Simakov	RW	325	43	124	167	0.51
(Russia) Nikita Tryamkin	D	678	39	112	151	0.22
(Kazakhstan) Nigel Dawes	LW	119	48	71	119	1.00
(Russia) Alexei Vasilevsky	D	415	42	76	118	0.28
(United States) Dan Sexton	RW	157	47	65	112	0.71
(Russia) Alexei Makeyev	LW	216	58	51	109	0.50
(Russia) Artyom Gareyev	RW	258	51	58	109	0.42

Goals
Player	Pos	G
(Germany) Brooks Macek	RW	155
(Russia) Anatoly Golyshev	RW	152
(France) Stephane Da Costa	C	103
(Russia) Alexei Makeyev	LW	58
(Russia) Artyom Gareyev	RW	51
(Kazakhstan) Nigel Dawes	LW	48
(United States) Dan Sexton	RW	47
(Russia) Alexei Simakov	RW	43
(Russia) Alexei Vasilevsky	D	42
(Russia) Stepan Khripunov	LW	42

Assists
Player	Pos	A
(France) Stephane Da Costa	C	186
(Russia) Anatoly Golyshev	RW	184
(Germany) Brooks Macek	RW	134
(Russia) Alexei Simakov	RW	124
(Russia) Nikita Tryamkin	D	112
(Kazakhstan) Jesse Blacker	D	77
(Russia) Alexei Vasilevsky	D	76
(Kazakhstan) Nigel Dawes	LW	71
(United States) Dan Sexton	RW	65
(Russia) Stepan Khripunov	LW	62
