= Alexei Makeyev =

Russian ice hockey player

- Born: 25 November 1991 (age 34) Novouralsk, Russian SFSR, Soviet Union
- Height: 5 ft 10 in (178 cm)
- Weight: 170 lb (77 kg; 12 st 2 lb)
- Position: Forward
- Shoots: Left
- VHL team Former teams: HC Yugra; Kedr Novouralsk; Avtomobilist Yekaterinburg; HC Vityaz; Avangard Omsk
- Playing career: 2012–present

Alexei Makeyev (born 25 November 1991) is a Russian professional ice hockey player who currently plays for HC Yugra of the Supreme Hockey League (VHL).

Makeyev made his Kontinental Hockey League (KHL) debut playing with Avtomobilist Yekaterinburg during the 2012–13 KHL season.

As a free agent, Makeyev was signed to a one-year contract, joining his third KHL club in Avangard Omsk on 18 August 2024.
