= HC Vityaz =

Professional ice hockey club based in Podolsk, Russia

- City: Balashikha, Moscow Oblast
- League: First League 1997–1998; Vysshaya Liga 1998–2000, 2001–2005; RSL 2000–2001, 2005–2008; KHL 2008–2025
- Founded: 1996; 30 years ago
- Folded: 2025; 1 year ago
- Home arena: Arena Balashikha (capacity: 5,500)
- Colours
- Affiliates: Russkie Vityazi (MHL)
- Website: hcvityaz.ru

Franchise history
- HC Vityaz Podolsk; 1996–2004, 2013–2022; HC Vityaz Chekhov; 2004–2013; Vityaz Moscow Region; 2022–2025

Hockey Club Vityaz Moscow Region (ХК Витязь) were a professional ice hockey club based in Balashikha, Russia. They competed as a member of the Bobrov Division in the Kontinental Hockey League (KHL). In the first few seasons of the KHL, the team was widely known for playing a tough and physical North American-influenced style of ice hockey. As an inaugural member of the KHL and after 17 seasons in the league, Vityaz announced their initial withdrawal for the 2025–26 season due to financial constraints, on 24 June 2025.

Vityaz's youth academy survived, and is currently playing as Vityaz Podolsk in the Russian Hockey League, Russia's second-tier junior league.

== History ==
The club was founded in 1996 in Podolsk. In 2000, the team moved to the neighboring city of Chekhov; however, the team kept playing under the name Vityaz Podolsk until 2004, where the renaming was finally done. The team initially played its home games at the Ice Palace Vityaz in Podolsk, the same arena HC MVD used until 2006. Such a thing was allowed by virtue of the opening in 2004 of a new arena in Chekhov, the Vityaz Ice Hockey Center, that Vityaz began using. Initially, this arena had a capacity of 1,370; it was expanded in 2007–08 to 3,300. Vityaz played at the top level of Russian hockey for the 2000–01 season; it got relegated to Vysshaya Liga at the end of the season. In 2005, Vityaz made to the Vysshaya Liga final losing the championship to HC MVD 4 games to 1 but earned a promotion back to the elite level.

Rumors of a move back to Podolsk arose in the wake of the inaugural KHL season as even with the expansion of 2007–08, due to Chekhov's capacity being below the KHL league standards. The team restarted playing their home games in Podolsk, but remained attached to Chekhov. For the 2013–14 KHL season, the team moved back to Podolsk.

=== Kontinental Hockey League ===
Chekhov's debuts in the KHL were pretty bad. Vityaz registered a mere 6 wins in regulation, plus 5 in overtime; in counterpart for those 11 wins, the team lost 45 times (of which, 12 games were in overtime). The meager 40 points collected meant that the team finished at a dismal 23rd place out of 24, a single point ahead of the equally bad Khimik Voskresensk. Head coach Sergei Gomolyako made the mistake in October to dress one more foreign player than allowed by the rules, resulting in a match lost by forfeit. Gomolyako claimed he ignored there was such a rule, and the following week, he was fired, to be replaced by former NHL player and Vityaz head coach Mike Krushelnyski. Vityaz' fans enjoyed the return of Krushelnyski, who had brought the team to the playoffs in 2006–07. But Chekhov's goon-full roster, which general manager Alexei Zhamnov wishes to shape after the 1990s Chicago Blackhawks for whom he played, just couldn't bring good enough performances to repeat the feat. They however led the league in penalty minutes, some 500 minutes ahead of the second most penalized club, with players such as Nathan Perrott (137 minutes in 9 matches and not a single point), Darcy Verot (more disciplined and productive than in his first season with Vityaz, even though it still only meant 5 points and 168 minutes) and Chris Simon (league leader at 263 minutes, and club's second best scorer behind Gleb Klimenko at 27 points).

==== Death of Alexei Cherepanov ====
Chekhov's season was darkened by the death of Alexei Cherepanov in October 2008, a death occurred on its home ice and that might have been avoided had Chekhov's arena been equipped with a working defibrillator and the ambulance that is required to remain available until the end of the match not departed well before the end, resulting in much longer delays between the accident and the moment where Cherepanov arrived at the nearest hospital.

==== Mass brawl in Chekhov ====
2009–10 felt like déja-vu for Chekhov. After almost being thrown out of the league due to its finances in August (it needed to find 300 million rubles, which it did), the Knights started the season with two wins and temporarily led the league. Things didn't last however as the team finished 23rd out of 24 teams with only 13 regular-season wins (plus 3 in overtime and 2 in the shootouts—an improvement from the previous year), 54 points and, once again, a colossal amount of penalty minutes: 1522, ahead and by far every other team in the league. Vadim Berdnikov, Gleb Klimenko (who came back from Kazan) and Chris Simon led the offence with respectively 33, 27 and 25 points.

Once again, an incident between Vityaz and Avangard marked the season. On January 9, 2010, the game between Vityaz and Avangard was stopped after 3 minutes and 39 seconds when a bench-clearing and penalty-box-clearing brawl broke out. Darcy Verot had instigated the brawl after three minutes of play when he shot the puck at an Avangard player. A mass brawl quickly followed, which the referees could deal with. However, as soon as the game was resumed, fighting resumed as well and both benches cleared to join the fight. The game was quickly getting out of hand and the officials decided it was better to cancel the whole game. Little else could be done, as a whopping total of 707 penalty minutes had been incurred – a new world record – and a total of 33 players on both teams have been ejected from the game, as well as both head coaches. Only four players avoided being ejected. The KHL imposed a total of 5.7 million rubles (about US $191,000) fines, including 150,000 rubles fines to Vityaz's Darcy Verot and Brandon Sugden and Avangard's Alexander Svitov and Dmitry Vlasenkov. Additionally, Verot, Sugden, Vlasenkov and four other Vityaz players received one-game suspensions.

=== Relocation to Balashikha and separation from youth academy ===
In 2022, Vityaz moved from the Vityaz Ice Palace in Podolsk, which was declared no longer acceptable for the KHL's requirements, to Balashikha Arena in Balashikha. Vityaz's youth academy stayed in Podolsk.

In 2023, Vityaz's academy was separated from the KHL club completely, instead signing an affiliation agreement with Torpedo Nizhny Novgorod, .

==== Withdrawal from KHL ====
As an inaugural member of the KHL and having completed the 2024–25 season, Vityaz announced their initial withdrawal from the KHL after 17 seasons for the upcoming 2025–26 season due to financial constraints, on 24 June 2025. After an emergency league meeting with the board of directors, it was announced that Vityaz would not be eligible for a return to the competition until 2030. All contracted players were to be released as free agents from 15 July and junior club Russkie Vityazi was confirmed to have withdrawn from the MHL for the season.

In 2026, a junior team under the Vityaz Podolsk name, part of the Vityaz youth academy, started play in the Russian Hockey League.

== Season-by-season KHL record ==
Note: GP = Games played, W = Wins, L = Losses, T = Ties, OTL = Overtime/shootout losses, Pts = Points, GF = Goals for, GA = Goals against

Season	GP	W	OTW	L	OTL	Pts	GF	GA	Finish	Top Scorer	Playoffs
2008–09	56	7	5	32	12	43	137	226	6th, Chernyshev	Gleb Klimenko (30 points: 19 G, 11 A; 39 GP)	Did not qualify
2009–10	56	13	5	33	5	54	142	216	6th, Tarasov	Vadim Berdnikov (33 points: 9 G, 24 A; 47 GP)	Did not qualify
2010–11	54	13	4	32	5	52	119	178	6th, Tarasov	Vadim Berdnikov (29 points: 12 G, 17 A; 53 GP)	Did not qualify
2011–12	54	10	6	36	2	44	108	193	6th, Tarasov	Mikhail Anisin (29 points: 16 G, 13 A; 38 GP)	Did not qualify
2012–13	52	11	7	26	8	55	119	151	6th, Bobrov	Alexander Korolyuk (29 points: 15 G, 14 A; 41 GP)	Did not qualify
2013–14	54	12	6	26	10	58	110	147	7th, Tarasov	Maxim Afinogenov (26 points: 12 G, 14 A; 53 GP)	Did not qualify
2014–15	60	20	6	28	6	78	152	186	7th, Tarasov	Mario Kempe (30 points: 13 G, 19 A; 54 GP)	Did not qualify
2015–16	60	17	6	32	3	70	129	166	6th, Tarasov	Maxim Afinogenov (28 points: 15 G, 13 A; 56 GP)	Did not qualify
2016–17	60	26	7	22	5	97	162	158	5th, Tarasov	Alexei Kopeikin (51 points: 21 G, 30 A; 60 GP)	Lost in Conference Quarterfinals, 0–4 (SKA Saint Petersburg)
2017–18	56	17	4	27	8	67	131	160	7th, Tarasov	Alexei Makeyev (38 points: 18 G, 20 A; 55 GP)	Did not qualify
2018–19	62	23	5	27	7	63	134	169	4th, Tarasov	Miro Aaltonen (42 points: 19 G, 23 A; 61 GP)	Lost in Conference Quarterfinals, 0–4 (CSKA Moscow)
2019–20	62	19	8	24	11	65	137	166	3rd, Tarasov	Alexander Semin (38 points: 18 G, 20 A; 50 GP)	Lost in Conference Quarterfinals, 0–4 (SKA Saint Petersburg)
2020–21	60	21	6	28	5	59	155	175	5th, Bobrov	Justin Danforth (55 points: 23 G, 32 A; 58 GP)	Did not qualify
2021–22	48	9	6	20	13	43	121	149	5th, Bobrov	Niko Ojamäki (43 points: 29 G, 14 A; 48 GP)	Did not qualify
2022–23	68	24	10	26	8	76	169	170	3rd, Bobrov	Scott Wilson (39 points: 20 G, 19 A; 66 GP)	Lost in Conference Quarterfinals, 1–4 (Lokomotiv Yaroslavl)
2023–24	68	14	6	40	8	48	133	224	5th, Bobrov	Derek Barach (35 points: 10 G, 25 A; 68 GP)	Did not qualify
2024–25	68	19	5	33	11	59	163	188	4th, Bobrov	Dmitri Buchelnikov (54 points: 15 G, 39 A; 65 GP)	Did not qualify

== Players ==
=== KHL All-Star Game ===
Players

- Mikhail Anisin, RW, 2011–12, 2012
- Alexander Korolyuk, RW, 2004–05, 2005–08, 2012–2014, 2013
- Chris Simon, LW, 2008–11, 2010, 2011
- Ivan Lisutin, G, 2012–15, 2014
- Maxim Afinogenov, RW, 2013–18, 2014

=== Head coaches ===
- Vyacheslav Anisin, July 1, 1997 – 31 May 1999
- Alexander Zachesov, 1 June 1999 – 11 October 2000
- Alexander Barinev, 11 October 2000 – 30 April 2001
- Valery Belov, 30 April 2001 – 15 June 2003
- Yury Rumyancev, 15 June 2003 – 5 April 2004
- Miskat Fakrutdinov, 5 April 2004 – 16 January 2005
- Alexander Bodunov, January 16, 2005 – 30 June 2005
- Anatoly Bogdanov, 30 June 2005 – 27 October 2005
- Alexander Bodunov, 27 October 2005 – 4 April 2006
- Mike Krushelnyski, 4 April 2006 – 31 March 2007
- Miskat Fakrutdinov, 18 June 2007 – 28 October 2007
- Sergey Gomolyako, 29 October 2007 – 5 November 2008
- Mike Krushelnyski, 6 November 2008 – 3 December 2009
- Alexei Yarushkin, 6 December 2009 – 14 October 2010
- Andrei Nazarov, 14 October 2010 – 18 May 2012
- Yuri Leonov, 20 June 2012 – 11 January 2014
- Oleg Orekhovskiy, 11 January 2014 – 2016
- Valeri Belov, 2016 – 2019
- Mikhail Kravets, 2019 – 2021
- Yuri Babenko, 2021 – 2022
- Vyacheslav Butsayev, 2022 – 2023
- Dmitri Ryabykin, 2023 – 2024
- Pavel Desyatkov, 2024 – 2025

== Franchise records and leaders ==
=== KHL scoring leaders ===
These are the top-ten point-scorers in franchise history in the KHL. Note: Pos = Position; GP = Games played; G = Goals; A = Assists; Pts = Points; P/G = Points per game;

Player	GP	G	A	Pts	PIM	+/-	PPG	SHG	GWG
(Russia) Alexei Makeyev	419	96	112	208	136	−7	21	5	18
(Russia) Maxim Afinogenov	268	80	84	164	325	−24	19	3	9
(Finland) Miro Aaltonen	198	57	95	152	76	4	22	2	11
(Czech Republic) Roman Horak	224	59	56	115	106	−22	21	5	4
(Russia) Alexander Semin	144	45	53	98	150	−12	17	0	11
(Russia) Vadim Berdnikov	163	31	61	92	177	−22	7	3	3
(Canada) Jeremy Roy	195	15	72	87	79	−19	7	2	1
(Sweden) Mario Kempe	166	39	44	83	144	−28	13	2	7
(Canada) Chris Simon	113	37	43	80	503	−17	19	0	9
(United States) Derek Barach	136	31	47	78	103	−22	8	0	8

== Honors ==
=== Runners-up ===
(silver) Vysshaya Liga (1): 2005

=== Champions ===
(gold) Wingas Cup (1): 2017

(gold) Lehner Cup (1): 2018
