= Vasilyevsky, Volgograd Oblast =

Vasilyevsky Васильевский
- Khutor
- Location within Volgograd Oblast Location within Russia
- Coordinates: 47°30′N 42°57′E
- Country: Russia
- Region: Volgograd Oblast
- District: Kotelnikovsky District
- Time zone: UTC+4:00

Vasilyevsky (Russian: Васильевский) is a rural locality (a khutor) in Semichenskoye Rural Settlement, Kotelnikovsky District, Volgograd Oblast, Russia. The population was 28 as of 2010.

== Geography ==
Vasilyevsky is located in steppe, 23 km southwest of Kotelnikovo (the district's administrative centre) by road. Semichny is the nearest rural locality.
