= Vasilyevskoye, Sheksninsky District, Vologda Oblast =

Vasilyevskoye Васильевское
- Village
- Location within Vologda Oblast Location within Russia
- Coordinates: 59°07′N 38°35′E
- Country: Russia
- Region: Vologda Oblast
- District: Sheksninsky District
- Time zone: UTC+3:00

Vasilyevskoye (Russian: Васильевское) is a rural locality (a village) in Ugolskoye Rural Settlement, Sheksninsky District, Vologda Oblast, Russia. The population was 17 as of 2002.

== Geography ==
Vasilyevskoye is located 18 km southeast of Sheksna (the district's administrative centre) by road. Suslovskoye is the nearest rural locality.
