= Demikhovo =

Demikhovo Демихово
- Village
- Location within Vladimir Oblast Location within Russia
- Coordinates: 56°11′N 39°48′E
- Country: Russia
- Region: Vladimir Oblast
- District: Sobinsky District
- Time zone: UTC+3:00

Demikhovo (Russian: Демихово) is a rural locality (a village) in Rozhdestvenskoye Rural Settlement, Sobinsky District, Vladimir Oblast, Russia. The population was 5 as of 2010. There are 2 streets.

== Geography ==
Demikhovo is located on the Vorsha River, 33 km northwest of Sobinka (the district's administrative centre) by road. Kudelino is the nearest rural locality.
