= Vasilyevskoye, Velikoustyugsky District, Vologda Oblast =

Vasilyevskoye Васильевское
- Selo
- Location within Vologda Oblast Location within Russia
- Coordinates: 60°55′N 46°27′E
- Country: Russia
- Region: Vologda Oblast
- District: Velikoustyugsky District
- Time zone: UTC+3:00

Vasilyevskoye (Russian: Васильевское) is a rural locality (a selo) and the administrative center of Krasavinskoye Rural Settlement, Velikoustyugsky District, Vologda Oblast, Russia. The population was 905 as of 2002. There are 10 streets.

== Geography ==
Vasilyevskoye is located 22 km northeast of Veliky Ustyug (the district's administrative centre) by road. Krasavino is the nearest rural locality.
