= Vasilyevsky, Vladimir Oblast =

Vasilyevsky Васильевский
- Settlement
- Location within Vladimir Oblast Location within Russia
- Coordinates: 55°16′N 41°13′E
- Country: Russia
- Region: Vladimir Oblast
- District: Melenkovsky District
- Time zone: UTC+3:00

Vasilyevsky (Russian: Васильевский) is a rural locality (a settlement) in Danilovskoye Rural Settlement, Melenkovsky District, Vladimir Oblast, Russia. The population was 1 as of 2010.

== Geography ==
Vasilyevsky is located 44 km west of Melenki (the district's administrative centre) by road. Dmitriyevo is the nearest rural locality.
