= JHC Avto =

- City: Yekaterinburg, Russia
- League: Junior Hockey League
- Conference: Eastern
- Founded: 2009
- Home arena: KRK Uralets (capacity: 5,570)
- Colors
- Affiliates: Avtomobilist Yekaterinburg (KHL)
- Website: Official Page

Franchise history
- 2009–present: MHC Avto

JHC Avto (Russian: Молодежный хоккейный клуб «Авто»; English: Junior hockey club «Avto») is a junior ice hockey team from Yekaterinburg, which contains players from the Avtomobilist Yekaterinburg school. They are members of the Junior Hockey League (MHL), the top tier of junior hockey in the country.
