= Vasilyevsky, Republic of Bashkortostan =

Vasilyevsky Васильевский
- Khutor
- Location within Bashkortostan Location within Russia
- Coordinates: 52°45′N 56°36′E
- Country: Russia
- Region: Bashkortostan
- District: Kugarchinsky District
- Time zone: UTC+5:00

Vasilyevsky (Russian: Васильевский) is a rural locality (a khutor) in Mrakovsky Selsoviet, Kugarchinsky District, Bashkortostan, Russia. The population was 36 as of 2010. There are 4 streets.

== Geography ==
Vasilyevsky is located 5 km north of Mrakovo (the district's administrative centre) by road. Sultangulovo is the nearest rural locality.
