= Vasilyevskaya, Vashkinsky District, Vologda Oblast =

Vasilyevskaya Васильевская
- Village
- Location within Vologda Oblast Location within Russia
- Coordinates: 60°16′N 38°00′E
- Country: Russia
- Region: Vologda Oblast
- District: Vashkinsky District
- Time zone: UTC+3:00

Vasilyevskaya (Russian: Васильевская) is a rural locality (a village) and the administrative center of Vasilyevskoye Rural Settlement, Vashkinsky District, Vologda Oblast, Russia. The population was 109 as of 2002. There are 8 streets.

== Geography ==
Vasilyevskaya is located 3 km northeast of Lipin Bor (the district's administrative centre) by road. Lukyanovo is the nearest rural locality.
