= Vasilyevsky, Irkutsk Oblast =

Vasilyevsky Васильевский
- Village
- Location within Irkutsk Oblast Location within Russia
- Coordinates: 58°08′N 114°20′E
- Country: Russia
- Region: Irkutsk Oblast
- District: Bodaybinsky District
- Time zone: UTC+8:00

Vasilyevsky (Russian: Васильевский) is a rural locality (a settlement) in Bodaybinsky District, Irkutsk Oblast, Russia. Population: 154 (2010 census);

== Geography ==
This rural locality is located 33 kilometres (21 mi) from Bodaybo (the district's administrative centre), 879 kilometres (546 mi) from Irkutsk (capital of Irkutsk Oblast) and 4,511 kilometres (2,803 mi) from Moscow. Andreyevsk is the nearest rural locality.

== History ==
In June 1948, an unspecified number of deported Lithuanians were allocated in the Vasilevsky settlement. A number of Lithuanians died, and were buried with Catholic rites, crosses, and name plates.

In 2007, Lithuanian researcher Gintautas Alekna surveyed the area and uncovered 43 burial sites.
