= Vasilyevsky, Voronezh Oblast =

Vasilyevsky Васильевский
- Settlement
- Location within Voronezh Oblast Location within Russia
- Coordinates: 51°07′N 40°40′E
- Country: Russia
- Region: Voronezh Oblast
- District: Talovsky District
- Time zone: UTC+3:00

Vasilyevsky (Russian: Васильевский) is a rural locality (a settlement) in Alexandrovskoye Rural Settlement, Talovsky District, Voronezh Oblast, Russia. The population was 120 as of 2010.

== Geography ==
It is located on the right bank of the Sukhaya Chigla River, 2 km WNW from Talovaya.
