= Vasilyevskoye, Sokolsky District, Vologda Oblast =

Vasilyevskoye Васильевское
- Village
- Location within Vologda Oblast Location within Russia
- Coordinates: 59°36′N 41°12′E
- Country: Russia
- Region: Vologda Oblast
- District: Sokolsky District
- Time zone: UTC+3:00

Vasilyevskoye (Russian: Васильевское) is a rural locality (a village) in Chuchkovskoye Rural Settlement, Sokolsky District, Vologda Oblast, Russia. The population was 7 as of 2002.

== Geography ==
Vasilyevskoye is located 88 km northeast of Sokol (the district's administrative centre) by road. Maloye Petrakovo is the nearest rural locality.
