= Daniel Vasilevski =

Australian soccer player

Personal information
- Full name: Daniel Vasilevski
- Date of birth: 4 September 1981 (age 45)
- Place of birth: Melbourne, Australia
- Height: 1.77 m (5 ft 9 1/2 in)
- Positions: Central midfielder; right back; right winger

Youth career
- 1998: Altona Magic
- 1998–1999: AIS

Senior career*
Years	Team	Apps	(Gls)
1999–2001	Carlton SC	12	(1)
2001–2004	Melbourne Knights	63	(3)
2005–2006	Perth Glory	0	(0)
2006–2007	Altona Magic	43	(6)
2007–2009	Melbourne Victory	12	(0)
2009	Newcastle Jets	0	(0)
2010–2011	South Melbourne	36	(6)
2012	Moreland Zebras	19	(0)
2013–2015	Heidelberg United	42	(7)
2016	Altona Magic SC	0	(0)
2018	Murray United	6	(0)

International career
2001	Australia U-20	11	(0)
Medal record
Representing Australia
Men's Association football
OFC U-19 Men's Championship
Winner	2001 Cook Islands/New Caledonia
- * Club domestic league appearances and goals as of 25 September 2018

Daniel Vasilevski (born 4 September 1981) is an Australian footballer who plays for Altona Magic SC in the Victorian State League Division 1.

Vasilevski is renowned for his quality delivery from set-plays and his ability to score spectacular free-kicks.

== Club career ==
Vasilevski was regarded as one of the most talented young football players of his generation and broke into the old National Soccer League as a teenager, earning a contract with Carlton Soccer Club and starring in the 99/01 National Soccer League.

When the Blues folded he moved across town and joined the Melbourne Knights and, when the A-League kicked off, he was signed by then Perth Glory coach and Liverpool F.C. legend Steve McMahon as part of the West Australian club's first playing list.

By this time, Vasilevski had also represented Australia U-20 11 times and played in the 2001 FIFA World Youth Championship. He has also had trials with Belgian giants Anderlecht and Danish outfit Aalborg BK.

After being released by Perth Glory he returned to Melbourne and played for Altona Magic in the Victorian Premier League before signing for A-League outfit Melbourne Victory in July 2007.

On 17 August 2009, it was announced that he had mutually agreed to part with Victory due to his lack of game time under Ernie Merrick, and took up a short-term contract with Newcastle Jets.

On 8 December 2009, Vasilevski signed a contract with South Melbourne for the 2010 and 2011 VPL seasons. He joined Moreland Zebras FC in 2012 and then Heidelberg United FC in 2013.

Vasilevski signed on for the 2016 season with Altona Magic SC in November 2015.

== Honours ==
Melbourne Victory

- A-League Championship: 2008–09
- A-League Premiership: 2008–09

Australia U-20

- OFC U-19 Men's Championship: 2001
