= Alexei Vasilevsky (ice hockey, born 1993) =

Russian ice hockey player (born 1993)

- Born: January 21, 1993 (age 33) Ufa, Russia
- Height: 5 ft 11 in (180 cm)
- Weight: 196 lb (89 kg; 14 st 0 lb)
- Position: Defence
- Shoots: Right
- KHL team Former teams: Amur Khabarovsk; Salavat Yulaev Ufa; Avtomobilist Yekaterinburg
- Playing career: 2012–present

Alexei Andreevich Vasilevsky (Василевский, Алексей Андреевич; January 21, 1993) is a Russian ice hockey defenceman. He is currently playing with Amur Khabarovsk of the Kontinental Hockey League (KHL). He is the elder brother of Andrei Vasilevskiy.

Vasilevsky made his KHL debut playing with Salavat Yulaev Ufa during the 2012–13 KHL season.
