= Andrei Vasilevskiy =

Russian ice hockey player (born 1994)

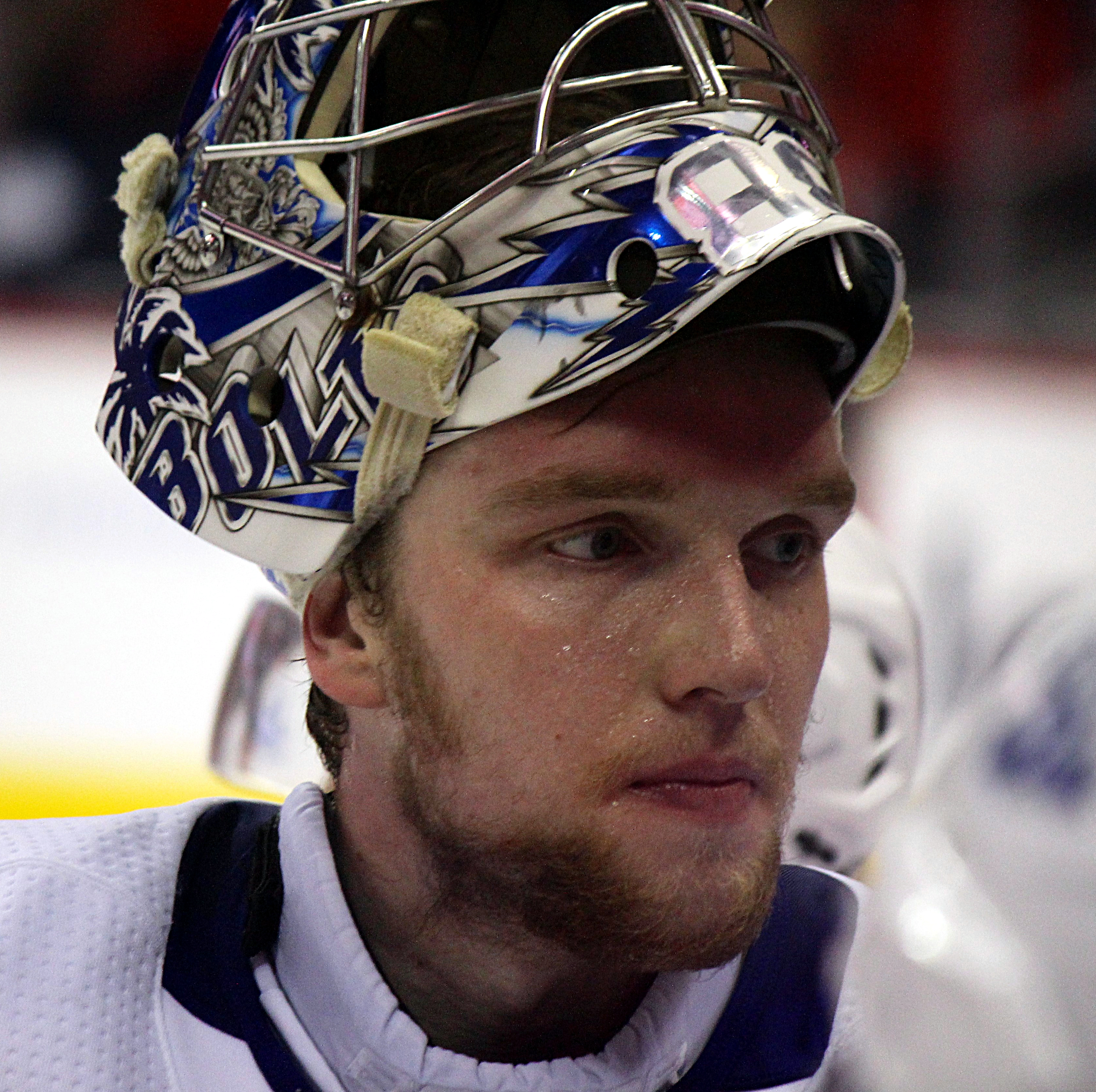
- Vasilevskiy with the Tampa Bay Lightning in May 2018
- Born: 25 July 1994 (age 32) Tyumen, Russia
- Height: 6 ft 4 in (193 cm)
- Weight: 220 lb (100 kg; 15 st 10 lb)
- Position: Goaltender
- Catches: Left
- NHL team Former teams: Tampa Bay Lightning; Salavat Yulaev Ufa
- National team: Russia
- NHL draft: 19th overall, 2012; Tampa Bay Lightning
- Playing career: 2010–present

Andrei Andreyevich Vasilevskiy (Russian: Андрей Андреевич Василевский; born 25 July 1994) is a Russian professional ice hockey player who is a goaltender for the Tampa Bay Lightning of the National Hockey League (NHL). He was drafted in the first round, 19th overall, by the Lightning at the 2012 NHL entry draft.

Nicknamed the "Big Cat" and "Vasy", Vasilevskiy is a two-time Vezina Trophy winner, as the league's top goaltender in the 2018–19 season and the 2025–26 season. He was also nominated for the 2017–18 NHL season. He led the league in wins for five consecutive seasons (2017–18 to 2021–22). He backstopped the Lightning to back-to-back Stanley Cup championships in 2020, where he set a record of 18 playoff wins (only possible because that year's postseason had play-in games), and again in 2021 where he won the Conn Smythe Trophy as the most valuable player in the playoffs.

== Playing career ==
=== Junior ===
He was originally selected by Salavat Yulaev Ufa in the first round, seventh overall, of the 2011 KHL Junior Draft.

Vasilevskiy was selected 19th overall in the 2012 NHL entry draft by the Tampa Bay Lightning. On 6 May 2014, he was signed by the Lightning to a three-year, entry-level contract.

=== Professional (2014–present) ===
==== Early years in Tampa Bay (2014–2016) ====
On 27 September, Vasilevskiy was assigned to the Syracuse Crunch of the American Hockey League (AHL), the top minor league affiliate of the Tampa Bay Lightning. On 15 December, Vasilevskiy was named the CCM/AHL Player of the Week. In the previous week, he allowed just one goal on 56 shots faced in two games, which was good for a 0.50 goals against average (GAA) and a .982 save percentage. Vasilevskiy had a 29-save shutout against the Springfield Falcons, which snapped their franchise-record 11-game winning streak. In the next game, he made 29 saves in a 4–1 victory over the Hershey Bears. Vasilevskiy had compiled a record of 8–3–3 in 14 appearances with Syracuse that season, with a 2.34 GAA, .918 save percentage and two shutouts. On 2 January 2015, he was named CCM/AHL Goaltender of the Month for December, posting a 4–0–1 record with a 1.17 GAA and a .962 save percentage. He was the first Syracuse goaltender to win the award since Karl Goehring was honored in March 2008.

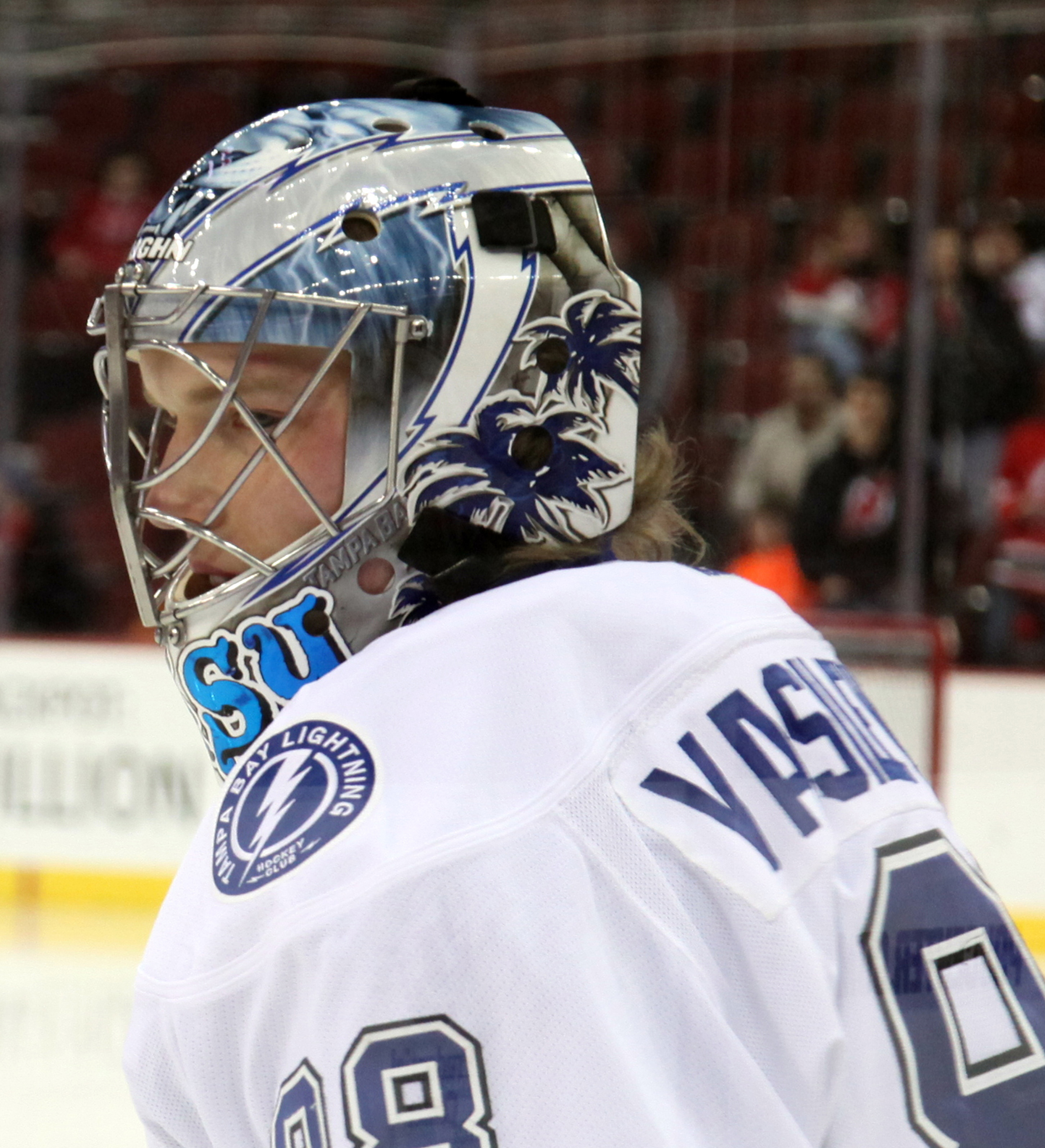
Vasilevskiy with the Lightning in December 2014

On 16 December 2014, Vasilevskiy was recalled to the Tampa Bay Lightning. He then started that night in his NHL debut, a 3–1 victory over the Philadelphia Flyers. In the process he also became the first NHL goaltender to ever wear uniform number 88. He recorded his first NHL shutout on 3 March 2015, over the Buffalo Sabres in a 28-save performance. Vasilevskiy's first playoff win came on 6 June, when he replaced starting goaltender Ben Bishop twice during the third period of game two of the Cup Final against the Chicago Blackhawks; he thus became the first goalie in 24 years to win a playoff Final in relief and the first to earn his first career playoff win in relief in the Final since Lester Patrick in 1928. The Lightning lost the finals against the Blackhawks in six games.

On 3 September, Vasilevskiy had successful surgery to remove a blood clot from near his left collarbone and to treat a type of thoracic outlet syndrome. Vasilevskiy was expected to return to the ice in 2–3 months. On 21 October, Vasilevskiy was cleared to come off of his blood thinner medication, allowing him to return to practice. On 1 November, the Lightning recalled Vasilevskiy from his conditioning stint with the Crunch, where he made 56 of 58 saves in two wins. Vasilevskiy made his return to the NHL that same day, in a 4–3 Lightning victory over the Carolina Hurricanes. Vasilevskiy once again filled in for Ben Bishop in round three of the 2016 playoffs against the Pittsburgh Penguins after Bishop got injured. Despite Vasilevskiy's strong performance, the Lightning lost in seven games, one win shy of a second consecutive appearance in the Stanley Cup Final. Vasilevskiy appeared in 24 games with the team during the 2015–16 season, posting a record of 11–10–0 to go along with a 2.76 goals-against average and .910 save percentage, as well as one shutout in his second season. He also played in eight Stanley Cup playoff games, recording a record of 3–4 to go along with a 2.76 goals-against average and .925 save percentage.

==== Emergence, first Vezina Trophy, back-to-back Stanley Cup wins, Conn Smythe Trophy (2016–2023) ====
On 1 July 2016, the Lightning announced the re-signing of Vasilevskiy to a three-year contract extension. On 28 December, Vasilevskiy recorded his first career NHL point as an assist on an overtime goal scored by Tyler Johnson, which came in a 4–3 victory over the Montreal Canadiens. Vasilevskiy finished the 2016–17 campaign with a 23–17–7 record in 50 games played as the Lightning as a team finished one point out of a playoff spot.

On 26 October 2017, Vasilevskiy played in his 100th career NHL game in a 3–2 win over the Detroit Red Wings. In that game, Vasilevskiy recorded his 8th consecutive win of the season, tying Vasilevskiy with Nikolai Khabibulin for most consecutive wins by a Lightning goaltender. Four days later Vasilevskiy recorded his 9th consecutive win, passing Khabibulin for most consecutive wins in franchise history. This was also Vasilevskiy's 10th win of the month of October, which tied him with Manny Legace and Craig Anderson for the most wins in a single season in the month of October in NHL history. On 12 December, Vasilevskiy recorded a 3–0 shutout against the St. Louis Blues at the Scottrade Center. The win was Vasilevskiy's 20th of the season over 25-games, the fifth fastest in NHL history. This also made Vasilevskiy only the sixth goalie in NHL history to record 20 wins in 25 games played. On 10 January 2018, Vasilevskiy was named to the 2018 NHL All-Star Game, his first. On 22 January, Vasilevskiy recorded a shutout win in a 2–0 win over the Chicago Blackhawks at United Center. The shutout was Vasilevskiy's seventh of the season, which tied him with Nikolai Khabibulin for the most shutouts in a single season by a Lightning goalie. Additionally, Vasilevskiy set the franchise record for most road shutouts in a single season, with six. On 27 February, Vasilevskiy recorded his 78th career NHL win, moving Vasilevskiy past Daren Puppa for third most in Lightning history. On 20 March, Vasilevskiy recorded his 41st win of the season, surpassing Ben Bishop for most wins in a single season in franchise history, placing him third. On 3 April, Vasilevskiy recorded his 43rd win of the season in a 4–0 shutout of the visiting Boston Bruins, surpassing Nikolai Khabibulin for second most wins in franchise history, with 84. Vasilevskiy's eighth shutout of the season gave him sole possession for the most shutouts in a single season by a Lightning goaltender. On 17 April, Vasilevskiy was nominated for the Vezina Trophy for the first time in his career as the NHL's yearly award for top goaltender (which eventually went to Nashville Predators goaltender Pekka Rinne.

On 14 November 2018, Vasilevskiy suffered an injury while in practice. Two days later, it was announced that he would be sidelined for four to six weeks with a broken left foot. Vasilevskiy returned 4 weeks later, starting his first game back on 13 December, at home against the Toronto Maple Leafs. That night his 48 saves tied Ben Bishop's team record from four seasons prior, as the Lightning defeated the Leafs 4–1. On 8 January 2019, Vasilevskiy was added to the Atlantic Division roster for the 2019 National Hockey League All-Star Game as a replacement for an injured Carey Price. On 15 January, Vasilevskiy recorded a shutout in a 2–0 Lightning win over the Dallas Stars at American Airlines Center. The shutout moved Vasilevskiy past Nikolai Khabibulin (14) for second-most shutouts in franchise history (15). On 14 February, Vasilevskiy recorded his 17th shutout in a 6–0 Lightning victory over the Dallas Stars, tying him with Ben Bishop for most shutouts in Lightning history. Two days later, in Tampa's next game, the record became Vasilevskiy's alone at 18. On 20 March, Vasilevskiy recorded 54 saves in a 5–4 overtime win over the Washington Capitals at Capital One Arena to set the Lightning record for the most saves in a game. In a 13-save victory over the Boston Bruins on 25 March, Vasilevskiy moved past Ben Bishop for the most saves in franchise history, with 5739. On 1 April, Vasilevskiy started in his 207th career NHL game, which came in a 5–2 win over the Ottawa Senators. This resulted in Vasilevksiy passing Daren Puppa (206) for second most starts in franchise history. On 19 June, at the 2019 NHL Awards, Vasilevskiy was awarded the Vezina Trophy as the top goaltender in the league after being a finalist for the second consecutive season and second time in his career altogether. He was the first player in franchise history to win the award.

On 29 July, Vasilevskiy signed an eight-year, $76 million contract extension to remain with the Lightning through the 2027–28 season. Vasilevskiy was named a finalist for the Vezina Trophy for the third consecutive season (which eventually was awarded to Connor Hellebuyck of the Winnipeg Jets). On 11 August 2020, Vasilevskiy made 61 saves in a five overtime victory over the Columbus Blue Jackets in the opening game of the first round of the playoffs, the most saves in a playoff game in Lightning history. On 25 August, Vasilevskiy recorded an overtime victory over the Boston Bruins in the second game of their second round series. The win was Vasilevskiy's 22nd, as he passed both Ben Bishop and Nikolai Khabibulin for the most playoff victories in Lightning playoff history. On 28 September, Vasilevskiy recorded his first career playoff shutout in the Lightning's Stanley Cup clinching win over the Dallas Stars in game six of the 2020 Stanley Cup Final, winning the game two–0 and the series 4–2. With the shutout, Vasilevskiy joined Tom Barrasso as the only goaltenders in NHL history to record their first shutout in a playoff year during the Stanley Cup clinching game. He also set an NHL record for the most minutes played by a goaltender in the postseason (1,708:12) and the most postseason wins in a single season (18). Vasilevskiy's mark for postseason wins was set during the expanded 24-team postseason field due to the COVID-19 pandemic, which makes it a record that cannot be broken under the standard four-round NHL playoff format.

Vasilevskiy continued his stellar play during the pandemic shortened 2020–21 season and was named a finalist for the Vezina trophy for the fourth straight season (which was eventually given to Marc-André Fleury of the Vegas Golden Knights). In each of the series clinching 2021 playoff games, Vasilevskiy earned a shut out. On 7 July 2021, Vasilevskiy posted a 1–0 shutout against the Montreal Canadiens to take win the series 4–1, as the Lightning clinched their second consecutive Stanley Cup. Vasilevskiy posted shutouts in all four of the Lightning series winning games, extending his streak to 5 consecutive series clinching shutouts, tying an NHL record with Chris Osgood and Clint Benedict. Vasilevskiy was awarded the Conn Smythe Trophy as the playoff MVP by NHL commissioner Gary Bettman, becoming the first goaltender since Jonathan Quick in 2012 to win the award.

On 23 May 2022, Vasilevskiy posted his NHL record-breaking sixth series clinching 2–0 shutout with a 49 save shutout against the Presidents' Trophy-winning Florida Panthers in a four game sweep in the second round of the 2022 playoffs, finishing the series with an astonishing .981 save percentage, as he allowed only three goals out of 154 shots. He and the Lightning reached their third consecutive Stanley Cup Final, but lost in six games to the top-seeded Colorado Avalanche.

Vasilevskiy ended the 2022–23 campaign with a 34–22–4 record, four shutout wins, 2.65 GAA and .915 save percentage in 60 games as the Lightning ranked sixth in the East. As the Lightning lost in the first round of the playoffs for the first time since 2019 by losing in six games against the third seeded Toronto Maple Leafs, he also posted a 2–4 record with a 3.56 GAA and .875 save percentage in all 6 games for the 2023 playoffs.

==== Recent years, second Vezina Trophy (2023–present) ====
On 28 September 2023, it was reported that Vasilevskiy had undergone back surgery. He missed the first two months of the 2023–24 season. Vasilevskiy made his return and season debut on 24 November, making 22 saves as the Lightning beat the Carolina Hurricanes 8–2 at PNC Arena

On 14 November 2024, Vasilevskiy earned his 300th career NHL win in the Lightning's 4–1 win over the Winnipeg Jets, becoming only the 40th goaltender in NHL history to reach 300 wins, and the fastest to reach the milestone. On 12 December, Vasilevskiy played his 500th NHL game in an 8–3 win over the Calgary Flames, becoming the 82nd goaltender in league history and first goaltender in Lightning history to play in as many games. He finished the 2024–25 season with a 38–20–5 record, coming second in the league in wins and playing more minutes than any other goaltender. He was for the fifth time named a Vezina Trophy finalist.

During the 2026 NHL Stadium Series game against the Boston Bruins on 1 February 2026, Bruins' goaltender Jeremy Swayman checked Brandon Hagel to the ice. Vasilevskiy skated to the Bruins' end of the ice, and the two goaltenders fought. It was Vasilevskiy's first and only recorded fight, becoming the second goaltender fight of the season as Alex Nedeljkovic fought Sergei Bobrovsky in a game between the San Jose Sharks and the two-time defending champion Florida Panthers less than two weeks earlier.

On 6 June 2026, Vasilevskiy was awarded his second Vezina Trophy. He led the league in with 39 wins and 2.13 goals against average.

== International play ==
Medal record

Men's ice hockey

Representing Russia

World Championships
Gold medal – first place	2014 Belarus	
Bronze medal – third place	2017 Germany/France	
Bronze medal – third place	2019 Slovakia	

World Junior Championships
Silver medal – second place	2012 Canada	
Bronze medal – third place	2013 Russia	
Bronze medal – third place	2014 Sweden	

World U18 Championships
Bronze medal – third place	2011 Germany	

In winning the 2014 IIHF World Championship with the Russian senior team, Vasilevskiy was awarded the Order of Honour on 27 May 2014.

On 2 March 2016, the Russian Ice Hockey Federation named Vasilevskiy to its roster for the 2016 World Cup of Hockey. Vasilevskiy was joined by Lightning teammates Vladislav Namestnikov, and Nikita Kucherov. The tournament took place from 17 Sep to 1 October 2016, in Toronto.

On 9 April 2017, the Russian Ice Hockey Federation named Vasilevskiy to its roster for the 2017 World Ice Hockey Championships. Vasilevskiy was joined by teammate Nikita Kucherov. On 21 May 2017, Vasilevskiy helped Russia capture a bronze medal when they defeated Finland in the bronze medal game. Additionally, Vasilevskiy was voted the top goaltender of the tournament.

== Personal life ==
His father, Andrei Vasilevski (born 1966), was also a goaltender who competed in the Russian Superleague as a member of Salavat Yulaev Ufa. His elder brother, Alexei, plays in the KHL for Salavat Yulaev Ufa.

Vasilevskiy and his wife have one son. He considers himself a family man, spending time with his family when not busy with ice hockey, avoiding bars and social media. He has his wife's and son's names painted on his goaltender mask.

Vasilevskiy is a passionate Eastern Orthodox Christian, belonging to the Russian Orthodox Church. He regularly attends Church service at the Russian Orthodox Church in Tampa and has kept a plaque of Andrew the Apostle in his dressing room stall since joining the NHL.

== Career statistics ==
=== Regular season and playoffs ===
Bold indicates led league

			Regular season									Playoffs
Season	Team	League	GP	W	L	OTL	MIN	GA	SO	GAA	SV%	GP	W	L	MIN	GA	SO	GAA	SV%
2010–11	Tolpar Ufa	MHL	14	8	2	4	730	22	3	1.81	.937	2	1	1	87	3	0	2.05	.936
2011–12	Tolpar Ufa	MHL	27	15	8	3	1,477	55	0	2.23	.931	2	0	2	120	5	0	2.50	.931
2012–13	Tolpar Ufa	MHL	27	17	6	4	1,613	52	3	1.93	.930	3	0	2	189	9	0	2.85	.897
2012–13	Salavat Yulaev Ufa	KHL	8	4	1	0	298	11	1	2.22	.924	—	—	—	—	—	—	—	—
2013–14	Salavat Yulaev Ufa	KHL	28	14	8	5	1,601	59	3	2.21	.923	18	9	9	1,144	38	1	1.99	.934
2014–15	Syracuse Crunch	AHL	25	14	6	5	1,469	60	2	2.45	.917	—	—	—	—	—	—	—	—
2014–15	Tampa Bay Lightning	NHL	16	7	5	1	864	34	1	2.36	.918	4	1	1	113	6	0	3.19	.895
2015–16	Syracuse Crunch	AHL	12	7	4	0	711	23	1	1.94	.935	—	—	—	—	—	—	—	—
2015–16	Tampa Bay Lightning	NHL	24	11	10	0	1,259	58	1	2.76	.910	8	3	4	434	20	0	2.76	.925
2016–17	Tampa Bay Lightning	NHL	50	23	17	7	2,832	123	2	2.61	.917	—	—	—	—	—	—	—	—
2017–18	Tampa Bay Lightning	NHL	65	**44**	17	3	3,826	167	**8**	2.62	.920	17	11	6	1,000	43	0	2.58	.918
2018–19	Tampa Bay Lightning	NHL	53	**39**	10	4	3,204	128	6	2.40	.925	4	0	4	236	15	0	3.83	.856
2019–20	Tampa Bay Lightning	NHL	52	**35**	14	3	3,122	133	3	2.56	.917	25	**18**	7	1,709	54	1	1.90	.927
2020–21	Tampa Bay Lightning	NHL	42	**31**	10	1	2,524	93	5	2.21	.925	23	**16**	7	1,390	44	5	1.90	.937
2021–22	Tampa Bay Lightning	NHL	63	**39**	18	5	3,761	156	2	2.49	.916	23	**14**	9	1,403	59	1	2.52	.922
2022–23	Tampa Bay Lightning	NHL	60	34	22	4	3,597	159	4	2.65	.915	6	2	4	388	23	0	3.56	.875
2023–24	Tampa Bay Lightning	NHL	52	30	20	2	3,063	148	2	2.90	.900	5	1	4	298	16	0	3.22	.897
2024–25	Tampa Bay Lightning	NHL	63	38	20	5	3,743	135	6	2.16	.921	5	1	4	293	16	0	3.27	.872
2025–26	Tampa Bay Lightning	NHL	58	**39**	15	4	3,431	132	2	2.31	.912	7	3	4	440	16	1	2.18	.897
KHL totals			36	18	9	5	1,899	70	4	2.21	.923	18	9	9	1,144	38	1	1.99	.934
NHL totals			598	370	178	39	35,222	1,334	42	2.50	.917	127	70	54	7,644	312	8	2.43	.917

=== International ===
Year	Team	Event	Results	GP	W	L	MIN	GA	SO	GAA	SV%
2010	Russia	U18	4th	5	2	2	272	12	0	2.65	.897
2011	Russia	U18	3rd place, bronze medalist(s)	6	4	2	344	15	0	2.62	.936
2012	Russia	U18	5th	5	2	3	299	11	1	2.20	.922
2012	Russia	WJC	2nd place, silver medalist(s)	5	4	1	299	10	2	2.01	.953
2013	Russia	WJC	3rd place, bronze medalist(s)	4	3	1	164	5	1	2.04	.943
2014	Russia	WJC	3rd place, bronze medalist(s)	6	4	2	328	10	0	1.83	.933
2014	Russia	WC	1st place, gold medalist(s)	2	2	0	120	1	1	0.50	.985
2017	Russia	WC	3rd place, bronze medalist(s)	9	6	2	523	15	3	1.72	.936
2019	Russia	WC	3rd place, bronze medalist(s)	8	7	1	488	13	2	1.60	.946
Junior totals				31	19	11	1,706	63	5	2.22	.935
Senior totals				19	14	3	1,131	29	6	1.54	.946

== Awards and honors ==
Award	Year	Ref
KHL
Alexei Cherepanov Award	2014	
NHL
All-Star Game	2018, 2019, 2020, 2022, 2023	
Vezina Trophy	2019, 2026	
First All-Star Team	2019, 2021, 2026	
Second All-Star Team	2025	
Stanley Cup champion	2020, 2021	
Conn Smythe Trophy	2021	
International
Order of Honour	2014	
WC All-Star Team	2017, 2019	
Best Goaltender	2017, 2019	
WJC All-Decade Team	2019	

== Records ==
=== Single season ===
- Most wins in a single season by a Tampa Bay Lightning goaltender – 44 (2017–18)
- Most shutouts in a single season by a Tampa Bay Lightning goaltender – 8 (2017–18)
- Most saves in a single season by a Tampa Bay Lightning goaltender – 1,908 (2017–18)
- Most shots against in a single season by a Tampa Bay Lightning goaltender – 2,075 (2017–18)

=== Career regular season ===
- Most wins by a Tampa Bay Lightning goaltender – 314
- Most shutouts by a Tampa Bay Lightning goaltender – 37
- Most games played by a Tampa Bay Lightning goaltender – 515
- Most career saves by a Tampa Bay Lightning goaltender – 11,261
- Most shots against by a Tampa Bay Lightning goaltender – 12,251
- Most saves in a game by a Tampa Bay Lightning goaltender – 54

=== Career playoffs ===
- NHL record most wins in a single postseason – 18 (2020)
- Most playoff wins by a Tampa Bay Lightning goaltender – 33
- Most playoff games played by a Tampa Bay Lightning goaltender – 58
- Most saves in a playoff game by a Tampa Bay Lightning goaltender – 61
- Most series clinching shutouts in NHL history - 6

Awards and achievements
Preceded by Slater Koekkoek	Tampa Bay Lightning first-round draft pick 2012	Succeeded by Jonathan Drouin
Preceded by Pekka Rinne; Connor Hellebuyck	Winner of the Vezina Trophy; 2019; 2026	Succeeded by Connor Hellebuyck; Incumbent
Preceded by Victor Hedman	Conn Smythe Trophy winner 2021	Succeeded by Cale Makar
