= Andrei Vasilevski (ice hockey, born 1966) =

Russian ice hockey player

- Born: July 21, 1966 (age 60) Leningrad, Soviet Union
- Height: 5 ft 9 in (175 cm)
- Weight: 218 lb (99 kg; 15 st 8 lb)
- Position: Goaltender
- Played for: RSL; Salavat Yulaev Ufa; Severstal Cherepovets; Rubin Tyumen
- NHL draft: Undrafted
- Playing career: 1982–2003

Andrei Leonidovich Vasilevski (Russian: Андрей Леонидович Василевский; born July 21, 1966) is a Russian former professional ice hockey goaltender.

Between 1982 and 2001 Vasilevski played at the highest level of hockey in the Soviet Union and Russia. He was a long-time member of Salavat Yulaev Ufa which competed in the Russian Superleague.

== Personal life ==
His son, Andrei Vasilevskiy (born 1994) who is also a goaltender, was selected 19th overall in the 2012 NHL entry draft by the Tampa Bay Lightning. He has since won the Stanley Cup twice, in 2020 and 2021, and won the Vezina Trophy.
